= Candies discography =

Japanese idol group Candies

- Studio albums: 10
- Live albums: 3
- Compilation albums: 24
- Singles: 18
- Video albums: (Note: This includes the music video compilation albums and concert DVDs.)
- Box sets: 5

The discography of the Japanese idol group Candies consists of 10 studio albums, 24 compilation albums, and 18 singles released since 1973.

== Albums ==
=== Studio albums ===
| Year | Information | Cash Box Japanese LPs weekly chart | Sales | RIAJ certification |
|---|---|---|---|---|
| 1973 | Anata ni Muchū: Uchiki na Candies: Released: December 5, 1973; Label: CBS Sony; Formats: LP, CT | | | |
| 1974 | Abunai Doyōbi: Candies no Sekai: Released: June 21, 1974; Label: CBS Sony; Formats: LP, CT | | | |
| 1974 | Namida no Kisetsu: Released: December 10, 1974; Label: CBS Sony; Formats: LP, CT | | | |
| 1975 | Toshishita no Otokonoko: Released: April 21, 1975; Label: CBS Sony; Formats: LP, CT | | | |
| 1975 | Sono Ki ni Sasenaide: Released: October 1, 1975; Label: CBS Sony; Formats: LP, CT | | | |
| 1976 | Haru Ichiban: Released: April 1, 1976; Label: CBS Sony; Formats: LP, CT | 10 | | |
| 1976 | Natsu ga Kita!: Released: July 21, 1976; Label: CBS Sony; Formats: LP, CT | | | |
| 1977 | Candies 1½: Yasashii Akuma: Released: April 21, 1977; Label: CBS Sony; Formats: 2LP, 2CT | 8 | | |
| 1977 | Candy Label: Released: September 1, 1977; Label: CBS Sony; Formats: LP+EP, CT | 7 | | |
| 1978 | Sōshunfu: Released: March 21, 1978; Label: CBS Sony; Formats: 2LP, 2CT | 2 | | |

=== Live albums ===
| Year | Information | Oricon weekly peak position | Sales | RIAJ certification |
|---|---|---|---|---|
| 1975 | Candies' Carnival for 10,000 People: Released: December 21, 1975; Label: CBS Sony; Formats: LP, CT | | | |
| 1976 | Kuramae Kokugikan Carnival for 10,000 People Vol. 2: Candies Live: Released: December 5, 1976; Label: CBS Sony; Formats: LP, CT | | | |
| 1978 | Candies Final Carnival Plus One: Released: May 21, 1978; Label: CBS Sony; Formats: 3LP, 3CT | 1 | | |

=== Compilations ===
| Year | Information | Oricon weekly peak position | Sales | RIAJ certification |
|---|---|---|---|---|
| 1974 | Candies Best Hits: Released: November 1, 1974; Label: CBS Sony; Formats: LP, CT | | | |
| 1975 | Candies Deluxe: Released: June 1, 1975; Label: CBS Sony; Formats: 2LP, cassette | | | |
| 1975 | Candies Best Hits (1975 Edition): Released: November 1, 1975; Label: CBS Sony; Formats: LP, CT | | | |
| 1976 | Best of Best: Candies no Subete: Released: June 1, 1976; Label: CBS Sony; Formats: CT | | | |
| 1976 | Candies Best Hits (1976 Edition): Released: November 1, 1976; Label: CBS Sony; Formats: LP, CT | | | |
| 1977 | Ketteiban Candies: Released: June 1, 1977; Label: CBS Sony; Formats: LP, CT | | | |
| 1977 | The Best: Candies' Shop: Released: November 1, 1977; Label: CBS Sony; Formats: LP, CT | | | |
| 1978 | The Best: Hohoemi Gaeshi: Released: June 1, 1978; Label: CBS Sony; Formats: LP, CT | | | |
| 1978 | The Best (1978 Edition): Released: November 1, 1978; Label: CBS Sony; Formats: LP, CT | | | |
| 1979 | The Best (1979 Edition): Released: June 1, 1979; Label: CBS Sony; Formats: LP, CT | | | |
| 1980 | The Best (1980 Edition): Released: November 1, 1980; Label: CBS Sony; Formats: LP, CT | | | |
| 1981 | The Best Again: Released: November 1, 1981; Label: CBS Sony; Formats: LP, CT | | | |
| 1982 | The Best (1982 Edition): Released: November 1, 1982; Label: CBS Sony; Formats: LP, CT | | | |
| 1985 | Candies Best Collection: Released: April 1, 1985; Label: CBS Sony; Formats: LP, CD, CT | | | |
| 1997 | Golden J-pop: The Best – Candies: Released: November 21, 1997; Label: Sony Records; Formats: CD, CT | | | |
| 2000 | 2000 Best: Candies: Released: June 21, 2000; Label: Sony Records; Formats: CD | 65 | | |
| 2001 | Dream Price 1000: Candies – Toshishita no Otokonoko: Released: October 11, 2001; Label: Sony Records; Formats: CD | | | |
| 2001 | Dream Price 1000: Candies – Haru Ichiban: Released: October 11, 2001; Label: SME Records; Formats: CD | | | |
| 2002 | Golden Best: Candies: Released: June 19, 2002; Label: SME Records; Formats: CD | 20 | | |
| 2006 | Candies Super Best: Released: July 21, 2006; Label: SME Records; Formats: CD | 121 | | |
| 2006 | Candies Best of Best: Released: September 21, 2006; Label: SME Records; Formats: CD | | | |
| 2011 | Golden Best: Candies Complete Single Collection: Released: June 8, 2011; Label: SME Records; Formats: CD, digital | 11 | | |
| 2015 | Golden Idol: Candies: Released: April 4, 2015; Label: SME Records; Formats: CD, digital | 102 | | |

=== Box sets ===
| Year | Information | Oricon weekly peak position | Sales | RIAJ certification |
|---|---|---|---|---|
| 1977 | Candies 1676 Days: Released: December 5, 1977; Label: CBS Sony; Formats: 5LP, 5CT | | | |
| 1994 | Candies Bible: Released: May 1, 1994; Label: Sony Records; Formats: CD | | | |
| 1998 | Candies History: Best Selection Box 1973—1978: Released: September 9, 1998; Label: Sony Records; Formats: CD | | | |
| 2004 | Candies Premium: All Songs CD Box: Released: June 30, 2004; Label: SME Records; Formats: CD | | | |
| 2008 | Candies Time Capsule: Released: September 3, 2008; Label: SME Records; Formats: CD | 68 | | |
| 2008 | Candies Densetsu CD-Box: Released: December 11, 2008; Label: SME Records; Formats: CD | | | |
| 2023 | The Platinum Collection: 50th Anniversary: Released: September 1, 2023; Label: SME Records; Formats: CD | | | |

== Singles ==
List of singles, with selected chart positions
| Title | Date | Peak chart positions | Sales (JPN) | RIAJ certification | Album |
| Title | Date | Oricon Singles Charts | Sales (JPN) | RIAJ certification | Album |
|---|---|---|---|---|---|
| "Anata ni Muchū" | September 1, 1973 | 36 | 81,000 | | Anata ni Muchū: Uchiki na Candies |
| "Soyokaze no Kuchizuke" | January 21, 1974 | 39 | 63,000 | | Abunai Doyōbi: Candies no Sekai |
| "Abunai Doyōbi" | April 21, 1974 | 46 | 38,000 | | Abunai Doyōbi: Candies no Sekai |
| "Namida no Kisetsu" | September 21, 1974 | 40 | 59,000 | | Namida no Kisetsu |
| "Toshishita no Otokonoko" | February 21, 1975 | 9 | 260,000 | | Toshishita no Otokonoko |
| "Uchiki na Aitsu" | June 1, 1975 | 18 | 98,000 | | Candies Best Hits (1975) |
| "Sono Ki ni Sasenaide" | September 1, 1975 | 17 | 103,000 | | Sono Ki ni Sasenaide |
| "Heart no Ace ga Detekonai" | December 5, 1975 | 11 | 172,000 | | Haru Ichiban |
| "Haru Ichiban" | March 1, 1976 | 3 | 362,000 | | Haru Ichiban |
| "Natsu ga Kita!" | May 31, 1976 | 5 | 176,000 | | Natsu ga Kita! |
| "Heart Dorobō" | September 1, 1976 | 17 | 90,000 | | Candies Best Hits (1976) |
| "Aishū no Symphony" | November 21, 1976 | 12 | 228,000 | | Candies 1½: Yasashii Akuma |
| "Yasashii Akuma" | March 1, 1977 | 4 | 390,000 | | Candies 1½: Yasashii Akuma |
| "Shochū Omimai Mōshiagemasu" | June 21, 1977 | 5 | 298,000 | | Candy Label |
| "Un, Deux, Trois" | September 21, 1977 | 7 | 281,000 | | Candies 1676 Days |
| "Wana" | December 5, 1977 | 3 | 392,000 | | Candies Final Carnival Plus One |
| "Hohoemi Gaeshi" | February 25, 1978 | 1 | 829,000 | | Candies Final Carnival Plus One |
| "Tsubasa" | November 21, 1978 | 16 | 109,000 | | Candies 1676 Days |
"—" denotes releases that did not chart.
