= Candies 1676 Days =

Box set by Candies
- Released: December 5, 1977
- Recorded: 1973–1977
- Genres: Kayōkyoku; teen pop
- Length: 3:31:21
- Languages: Japanese; English
- Label: CBS Sony
- Producers: Sumio Matsuzaki; Masatoshi Sakai

Candies chronology
The Best: Candies' Shop (1977)	Candies 1676 Days (1977)	Sōshunfu (1978)

Singles from Candies 1676 Days
- 1. "Un, Deux, Trois" Released: September 21, 1977; 2. "Tsubasa" Released: November 21, 1978

Candies 1676 Days (キャンディーズ1676日, Kyandīzu Senroppyakunanajūroku Nichi) is the first box set by Japanese idol trio Candies, released through CBS Sony on December 5, 1977. The five-disc album's title refers to the trio's timeline from the release of their debut single "Anata ni Muchū" on September 1, 1973, to the scheduled date of their farewell concert on April 4, 1978. The first three discs consist of the trio's singles, B-sides, and other songs. The fourth disc contains English and Japanese-language covers of western songs. The fifth disc features new recordings, including three songs from the trio's original musical Standby OK (スタンバイOK, Sutanbai OK).

== Track listing ==
Side A
No.	Title	Lyrics	Music	Arrangement	Length
1.	"Candies" (Kyandīzu (キャンディーズ))	Michio Yamagami	Hiroshi Miyagawa	Miyagawa	2:42
2.	"Anata ni Muchū" ((あなたに夢中; "Crazy for You"))	Yamagami	Kōichi Morita	Kōji Ryūzaki	3:11
3.	"Hagureta Kobato" ((はぐれた小鳩; "Stray Little Pigeon"))	Yamagami	Morita	Shunichi Makaino	2:52
4.	"Namida Sō" ((なみだ草; "Grass Tears"))	Yamagami	Morita	Ryūzaki	2:50
5.	"Abunai Doyōbi" ((危い土曜日; "Perilous Saturday"))	Kazumi Yasui	Morita	Ryūzaki	3:11
6.	"Namida no Kisetsu" ((なみだの季節; "Season of Tears"))	Kazuya Senke	Yūsuke Hoguchi	Hoguchi	3:44

Side B
No.	Title	Lyrics	Music	Arrangement	Length
1.	"Toshishita no Otokonoko" ((年下の男の子; "A Younger Boy"))	Senke	Hoguchi	Hoguchi	3:30
2.	"Watashi Dake no Kanashimi" ((私だけの悲しみ; "Only My Sorrow"))	Senke	Hoguchi	Hoguchi	3:40
3.	"Kanashiki Tameiki" ((悲しきためいき; "A Sad Sigh"))	Yamagami	Miyagawa	Ryūzaki	3:12
4.	"Kuchizuke no Ato" ((くちづけのあと; "After a Kiss"))	Machiko Ryū	Hoguchi	Hoguchi	3:15
5.	"Ai no Shunkan" ((愛の瞬間; "Moments of Love"))	Haruo Hayashi	Miyagawa	Hoguchi	2:58
6.	"Uchiki na Aitsu" ((内気なあいつ; "Shy Guy"))	Senke	Hoguchi	Hoguchi	3:18

Side C
No.	Title	Lyrics	Music	Arrangement	Length
1.	"Sono Ki ni Sasenaide" ((その気にさせないで; "Don't Come On to Me"))	Senke	Hoguchi	Hoguchi	3:32
2.	"Bye Bye Sentimental" (Bai Bai Senchimentaru (バイ・バイ・センチメンタル))	Ryū	Hoguchi	Hoguchi	4:31
3.	"Dore ga Ii Kashira" ((どれがいいかしら; "Which One Is Better?"))	Senke	Hoguchi	Hoguchi	3:11
4.	"Kataomoi no Gogo" ((片想いの午後; "An Unrequited Afternoon"))	Ryū	Hoguchi	Hoguchi	4:06
5.	"Aki no Sketch" (Aki no Suketchi (秋のスケッチ; "Autumn Sketch"))	Ryū	Hoguchi	Hoguchi	3:13
6.	"Futari no Love Train" (Futari no Rabu Torein (二人のラブトレイン; "Our Love Train"))	Miki Fujimura; Ryū	Hoguchi	Hoguchi	3:07

Side D
No.	Title	Lyrics	Music	Arrangement	Length
1.	"Haru Ichiban" ((なみだの季節; "Spring's First Breeze"))	Hoguchi	Hoguchi	Hoguchi	3:20
2.	"Sayonara Bye Bye" (Sayonara Bai Bai (さよならバイバイ))	Kazuo Shiina	Keiichi Suzuki & Moonriders	Suzuki & Moonriders	5:08
3.	"Koi no Ayatsuri Ningyō" ((恋のあやつり人形; "Love Doll"))	Ryū	Kōji Makaino	K. Makaino	3:24
4.	"Natsu ga Kita!" ((夏が来た!; "Summer Has Come!"))	Hoguchi	Hoguchi	Hoguchi	3:16
5.	"Kaerenai Yoru" ((帰れない夜; "The Night You Can't Go Home"))	Ryū	Hoguchi	Hoguchi	6:01
6.	"Heart no Ace ga Detekonai" (Hāto no Ēsu ga Detekonai (ハートのエースが出てこない; "Show the Ace of Hearts"))	Ryū	Morita	Ryūzaki	3:07

Side E
No.	Title	Lyrics	Music	Arrangement	Length
1.	"Yasashii Akuma" ((やさしい悪魔; "Sweet Little Devil"))	Makoto Kitajō	Takuro Yoshida	K. Makaino	3:37
2.	"Anata no Yesterday" (Anata no Iesutadei (あなたのイエスタデイ; "Your Yesterday"))	Kitajō	Yoshida	K. Makaino	4:00
3.	"Samba Natsu Samba"	Yukinojo Mori	K. Makaino	K. Makaino	2:53
4.	"Heart Dorobō" (Hāto Dorobō (ハート泥棒; "Thief of Hearts"))	Hayashi	Koichi Sugiyama	Motoki Funayama	3:31
5.	"Orange no Umi" (Orenji no Umi (オレンジの海; "The Orange Sea"))	Kitajō	Hoguchi	Hoguchi	3:28
6.	"Aishū no Symphony" (Aishū no Shinfonī (哀愁のシンフォニー; "Symphony of Sorrow"))	Rei Nakanishi	Takashi Miki	K. Makaino	3:45

Side F
No.	Title	Lyrics	Music	Arrangement	Length
1.	"Shochū Omimai Mōshiagemasu" ((暑中お見舞い申し上げます; "Midsummer Greetings"))	Kitajō	Juichi Sase	K. Makaino	2:59
2.	"Midnight Highway" (Middonaito Haiuei (ミッドナイト・ハイウェイ))	Yoshiko Tanaka	Tanaka	K. Makaino	2:45
3.	"Kyō kara Watashi wa" ((今日から私は; "From Now On, I..."))	Ran Itō	Itō	K. Makaino	2:33
4.	"Suteki na Mahōtsukai" ((素敵な魔法使い; "A Lovely Witch"))	Miki Fujimura	Fujimura	K. Makaino	3:30
5.	"Un, Deux, Trois" (An, Du, Torowa (アン・ドゥ・トロワ; "One, Two, Three"))	Kitajō	Yoshida	K. Makaino	3:38
6.	"Hello! Candies"	Ryū	Miyamoto	Funayama	3:56

Side G
No.	Title	Writer(s)	Arrangement	Length
1.	"Isabelle"	O. Tedjini	Tachio Akano	3:51
2.	"Let It Shine"	Linda Hargrove	Akano	2:22
3.	"Sugar Candy Kisses" (Shugā Kyandi Kissu (シュガー・キャンディ・キッス))	Wayne Bickerton; Tony Waddington; Mori	K. Makaino	3:18
4.	"It's Gonna Be a Cold Cold Christmas" (Koi no Rasuto Shīn (恋のラストシーン; "Love's Last Scene"))	R. Greenway; G. Stephens	Miyamoto	3:27
5.	"All You Get from Love Is a Love Song" (Futari no Ravu Songu (ふたりのラヴ・ソング; "Our Love Song"))	Steve Eaton; Yukinojo Mori	K. Makaino	4:03
6.	"Se piangi, se ridi"	Gianni Marchetti; Roberto Satti; Mogol; Yasui	Miyamoto	3:06

Side H
No.	Title	Writer(s)	Arrangement	Length
1.	"Dance, Dance, Dance"	Eric Faulkner; Stuart Wood	Akano	3:05
2.	"Midnight Love Affair"	Estelle Levitt; Pierre Groscolas; Michel Jourdan	Akano	4:29
3.	"Love Fever"	Faulkner; Wood; Ryū	Shigeki Watanabe	4:24
4.	"Masculin singulier" (Anata no Hitomi ni (あなたの瞳に; "In Your Eyes"))	Jacques Revaux; Michel Mallory; Ryū	Watanabe	4:07
5.	"Steel Willie"	Ian Mitchell; Damian McKee	Akano	4:58
6.	"Inside a Broken Dream" (Kodoku no Namida (孤独の涙; "Tears of Loneliness"))	Faulkner; Wood; Leslie McKeown	Akano	3:32

Side I
No.	Title	Lyrics	Music	Arrangement	Length
1.	"Gingakei made Tonde Ike!" ((銀河系まで飛んで行け!; "Fly to the Galaxy!"))	Kitajō	Yoshida	K. Makaino	3:19
2.	"Koi no Touchdown" (Koi no Tatchidaun (恋のタッチダウン; "Love Touchdown"))	Mori	Reijirō Koroku	Kōroku	3:11
3.	"Ai no Kaiten Mokuba ~ Anata wa Dare?" ((愛の回転木馬〜あなたは誰?; "Carousel of Love ~ Who Are You?"))	Mori	Kōroku	Kōroku	3:00
4.	"Watashi wo Omoidashite" ((私を憶い出して; "Remember Me"))	Mori	Kōroku	Kōroku	2:25
5.	"Ginga Kūkō" ((銀河空港; "Spaceport"))	Ryū	K. Makaino	K. Makaino	3:37
6.	"Mezame" ((めざめ; "Awakening"))	Mori	Kōroku	Kōroku	3:38

Side J
No.	Title	Lyrics	Music	Arrangement	Length
1.	"Un, Deux, Trois Part II" (An, Du, Trowa Pāto Tsū (アン・ドゥ・トロワ パートII))	Kitajō	Yoshida	K. Makaino	3:43
2.	"Et Cetera" (Eto Setera (エトセトラ))	Takemi Shima	Hoguchi	Hoguchi	4:33
3.	"Candies 1676 Days" (Kyandīzu Senroppyakunanajūroku Nichi (キャンディーズ1676日))	Shima	Hoguchi	Hoguchi	11:07
4.	"Tsubasa" ((つばさ; "Wings"))	Itō	Watanabe	Watanabe	4:46

== See also ==
- 1977 in Japanese music
