= Candies Best Hits =

Compilation albums by Candies

Candies Best Hits (キャンディーズ・ヒット全曲集, Kyandīzu Hitto Zenkyoku-shū) is the title of three different compilation albums by Japanese idol trio Candies, released through CBS Sony from 1974 to 1976.

== 1974 release ==
Candies Best Hits

Compilation album by Candies
- Released: November 1, 1974
- Recorded: 1973–1974
- Genres: kayōkyoku; teen pop
- Length: 37:55
- Languages: Japanese; English
- Label: CBS Sony
- Producers: Sumio Matsuzaki; Masatoshi Sakai

Candies chronology
Abunai Doyōbi: Candies no Sekai (1974)	Candies Best Hits (1974)	Namida no Kisetsu (1974)

The first edition of Candies Best Hits was released on November 1, 1974, covering the trio's songs from the albums Anata ni Muchū: Uchiki na Candies, Abunai Doyōbi: Candies no Sekai, and Namida no Kisetsu.

=== Track listing ===
All music is arranged by Kōji Ryūzaki, except where indicated.

Side A
No.	Title	Lyrics	Music	Arrangement	Length
1.	"Namida no Kisetsu" ((なみだの季節; "Season of Tears"))	Kazuya Senke	Yūsuke Hoguchi	Hoguchi	3:46
2.	"Candies" (Kyandīzu (キャンディーズ))	Michio Yamagami	Hiroshi Miyagawa	Miyagawa	2:35
3.	"Anata ni Muchū" ((あなたに夢中; "Crazy for You"))	Yamagami	Kōichi Morita		3:14
4.	"Uchiki na Toshigoro" ((内気なとしごろ) "Shy Age")	Yamagami	Miyagawa	Miyagawa	2:48
5.	"Soyokaze no Kuchizuke" ((そよ風のくちづけ; "Kiss of the Gentle Breeze"))	Yamagami	Morita	Hoguchi	3:14
6.	"Abunai Doyōbi" ((危い土曜日; "Perilous Saturday"))	Kazumi Yasui	Morita		3:16

Side B
No.	Title	Lyrics	Music	Arrangement	Length
1.	"Stupid Cupid" (Manuke na Kyūpitto (まぬけなキューピット))	Howard Greenfield; Candies	Neil Sedaka	Hoguchi	3:12
2.	"Kizutsukusedai" ((傷つく世代; "A Generation to Be Hurt"))	Mieko Arima	Kyōhei Tsutsumi		2:46
3.	"Ticket to Ride" (Namida no Jōshaken (涙の乗車券))	Lennon–McCartney	Lennon–McCartney		3:53
4.	"Anata e no Ai" ((あなたへの愛; "Love For You"))	Kazumi Yasui	Kunihiko Kase		2:55
5.	"Little Devil" (Chīsana Akuma (小さな悪魔))	Greenfield; Kenji Sazanami	Sedaka		3:04
6.	"Ai e no Start" (Ai e no Sutāto (愛への出発(スタート); "The Start of Love"))	Tokiko Iwatani	Tsutsumi		3:10

== 1975 release ==
Candies Best Hits

Compilation album by Candies
- Released: November 1, 1975
- Recorded: 1973–1975
- Genres: kayōkyoku; teen pop
- Language: Japanese
- Label: CBS Sony
- Producers: Sumio Matsuzaki; Masatoshi Sakai

Candies chronology
Sono Ki ni Sasenaide (1975)	Candies Best Hits (1975)	Candies' Carnival for 10,000 People (1975)

Singles from Candies Best Hits
- 1. "Uchiki na Aitsu" Released: June 1, 1975

The second edition of Candies Best Hits was released on November 1, 1975, adding songs from the albums Toshishita no Otokonoko and Sono Ki ni Sasenaide and including the single "Uchiki na Aitsu". It was bundled with a 1976 calendar poster.

=== Track listing ===
All music is arranged by Yūsuke Hoguchi, except where indicated.

Side A
No.	Title	Lyrics	Music	Arrangement	Length
1.	"Sono Ki ni Sasenaide" ((その気にさせないで; "Don't Come On to Me"))	Kazuya Senke	Hoguchi
2.	"Uchiki na Aitsu" ((内気なあいつ; "Shy Guy"))	Senke	Hoguchi
3.	"Abunai Doyōbi" ((危い土曜日; "Perilous Saturday"))	Kazumi Yasui	Kōichi Morita	Kōji Ryūzaki
4.	"Haru Ichiban" ((なみだの季節; "Spring's First Breeze"))	Hoguchi	Hoguchi
5.	"Namida no Kisetsu" ((なみだの季節; "Season of Tears"))	Senke	Hoguchi
6.	"Candies" (Kyandīzu (キャンディーズ))	Michio Yamagami	Hiroshi Miyagawa	Miyagawa

Side B
No.	Title	Lyrics	Music	Arrangement	Length
1.	"Toshishita no Otokonoko" ((年下の男の子; "A Younger Boy"))	Senke	Hoguchi
2.	"Sotsugyō" ((卒業; "Graduation"))	Tetsuya Chiaki	Tadao Inoue
3.	"Soyokaze no Kuchizuke" ((そよ風のくちづけ; "Kiss of the Gentle Breeze"))	Yamagami	Morita
4.	"Stupid Cupid" (Manuke na Kyūpitto (まぬけなキューピット))	Howard Greenfield; Candies	Neil Sedaka
5.	"Yasashī dake ja Iya" ((優しいだけじゃいや; "Just Be Gentle"))	Machiko Ryū	Kase	Ryūzaki
6.	"Anata ni Muchū" ((あなたに夢中; "Crazy for You"))	Yamagami	Morita

== 1976 release ==
Candies Best Hits

Compilation album by Candies
- Released: November 1, 1976
- Recorded: 1973–1976
- Genres: kayōkyoku; teen pop
- Language: Japanese
- Label: CBS Sony
- Producers: Sumio Matsuzaki; Masatoshi Sakai

Candies chronology
Natsu ga Kita! (1976)	Candies Best Hits (1976)	Kuramae Kokugikan Carnival for 10,000 People Vol. 2: Candies Live (1976)

Singles from Candies Best Hits
- 1. "Heart Dorobō" Released: September 1, 1976

The third edition of Candies Best Hits was released on November 1, 1975, adding songs from the albums Haru Ichiban and Natsu ga Kita! and including the single "Heart Dorobō".

=== Track listing ===
All music is composed and arranged by Yūsuke Hoguchi, except where indicated.

Side A
No.	Title	Lyrics	Music	Arrangement	Length
1.	"Hello! Candies"	Machiko Ryū	Mitsuo Miyamoto	Motoki Funayama
2.	"Namida no Kisetsu" ((なみだの季節; "Season of Tears"))	Kazuya Senke
3.	"Toshishita no Otokonoko" ((年下の男の子; "A Younger Boy"))	Senke
4.	"Sono Ki ni Sasenaide" ((その気にさせないで; "Don't Come On to Me"))	Senke
5.	"Anata ni Muchū" ((あなたに夢中; "Crazy for You"))	Michio Yamagami	Kōichi Morita	Kōji Ryūzaki
6.	"Heart Dorobō" (Hāto Dorobō (ハート泥棒; "Thief of Hearts"))	Haruo Hayashi	Koichi Sugiyama	Funayama

Side B
No.	Title	Lyrics	Music	Arrangement	Length
1.	"Haru Ichiban" ((なみだの季節; "Spring's First Breeze"))	Hoguchi
2.	"Paper Plane Love"	Yukinojo Mori
3.	"Natsu ga Kita!" ((夏が来た!; "Summer Has Come!"))	Hoguchi
4.	"Heart no Ace ga Detekonai" (Hāto no Ēsu ga Detekonai (ハートのエースが出てこない; "Show the Ace of Hearts"))	Machiko Ryū	Morita	Ryūzaki
5.	"Samba Natsu Samba"	Mori	Kōji Makaino	Makaino
6.	"Sayonara Bye Bye" (Sayonara Bai Bai (さよならバイバイ))	Kazuo Shiina	Keiichi Suzuki & Moonriders	Suzuki & Moonriders
