= Kuramae Kokugikan Carnival for 10,000 People Vol. 2: Candies Live =

Live album by Candies
- Released: December 5, 1976
- Recorded: October 11, 1976
- Venue: Kuramae Kokugikan
- Genre: Kayōkyoku; teen pop
- Length: 55:46
- Language: Japanese; English
- Label: CBS Sony
- Producer: Sumio Matsuzaki; Masatoshi Sakai

Candies chronology
Candies Best Hits (1976)	Kuramae Kokugikan Carnival for 10,000 People Vol. 2: Candies Live (1976)	Candies 1½: Yasashii Akuma (1977)

Kuramae Kokugikan Carnival for 10,000 People Vol. 2: Candies Live (蔵前国技館10,000人カーニバルVol.2 キャンディーズ・ライブ, Kuramae Kokugikan Ichiman-nin Kānibaru Vol. 2 Kyandīzu Raibu) is the second live album by Japanese idol trio Candies. Recorded live at the Kuramae Kokugikan on October 11, 1976, the album was released through CBS Sony on December 5, 1976.

== Track listing ==
Side A
No.	Title	Lyrics	Music	Length
1.	"Proud Mary" (Puraudo Mearī (プラウド・メアリー))	John Fogerty; Ryū	Fogerty	2:22
2.	"Anata ni Muchū" ((あなたに夢中; "Crazy for You"))	Michio Yamagami	Kōichi Morita	0:39
3.	"Do You Love Me"	Berry Gordy Jr.	Gordy	1:04
4.	"Abunai Doyōbi" ((危い土曜日; "Perilous Saturday"))	Kazumi Yasui	Morita	1:01
5.	"Koi no Ayatsuri Ningyō" ((恋のあやつり人形; "Love Doll"))	Machiko Ryū	Kōji Makaino	3:24
6.	"The House of the Rising Sun"	Traditional	Traditional	2:42
7.	"Never My Love"	Don Addrisi; Dick Addrisi	Don Addrisi; Dick Addrisi	4:23
8.	"Yozora no Hoshi" ((夜空の星; "Stars in the Night Sky"))	Tokiko Iwatani	Kōsaku Dan	1:59
9.	"Omoide no Nagisa" ((想い出の渚; "Beach of Memories"))	Shigeki Torizuka	Kunihiko Kase	2:53
10.	"(They Long to Be) Close to You"	Hal David	Burt Bacharach	4:48
11.	"Sir Duke"	Stevie Wonder	Wonder	4:02

Side B
No.	Title	Lyrics	Music	Length
1.	"Haru Ichiban" ((春一番; "Spring's First Breeze"))	Yūsuke Hoguchi	Hoguchi	3:22
2.	"Natsu ga Kita!" ((夏が来た!; "Summer Has Come!"))	Hoguchi	Hoguchi	3:00
3.	"Heart no Ace ga Detekonai" (Hāto no Ēsu ga Detekonai (ハートのエースが出てこない; "Show the Ace of Hearts"))	Ryū	Morita	3:14
4.	"Sono Ki ni Sasenaide" ((その気にさせないで; "Don't Come On to Me"))	Kazuya Senke	Hoguchi	2:41
5.	"Dancing Jumping Love" (Danshingu Janpingu Rabu (ダンシィング・ジャンピング・ラブ))	Yukinojo Mori	Kōji Nishimura	5:35
6.	"Mezame" ((めざめ; "Awakening"))	Reijirō Koroku	Koroku	5:29
7.	"Sayonara no Nai Carnival" (Sayonara no nai Kānibaru (さよならのないカーニバル; "A Carnival Without a Farewell"))	Mori	Naoki Watanabe	4:51

== Personnel ==
- Candies

- Ran Itō
- Miki Fujimura
- Yoshiko "Sue" Tanaka

== See also ==
- 1976 in Japanese music
