= Candies Final Carnival Plus One =

Live album by Candies
- Released: May 21, 1978
- Recorded: April 4, 1978 Discs 1–2); 1977–1978 (Disc 3)
- Venue: Korakuen Stadium
- Genres: Kayōkyoku; teen pop
- Length: 2:42:09
- Languages: Japanese; English
- Label: CBS Sony
- Producers: Sumio Matsuzaki; Masatoshi Sakai

Candies chronology
Sōshunfu (1978)	Candies Final Carnival Plus One (1978)	The Best: Hohoemi Gaeshi (1978)

Singles from Candies Final Carnival Plus One
- 1. "Wana" Released: December 5, 1977; 2. "Hohoemi Gaeshi" Released: February 25, 1978

Candies Final Carnival Plus One (キャンディーズ ファイナルカーニバル プラス・ワン, Kyandīzu Fainaru Kānibaru Purasu Wan) is the third and final live album by Japanese idol trio Candies. Recorded live at the last show of the trio's Thank You Carnival (ありがとうカーニバル, Arigatō Kānibaru) tour at Korakuen Stadium on April 4, 1978, the three-disc album was released through CBS Sony on May 21, 1978. The third disc consists of the trio's final studio recordings, including the singles "Wana" and "Hohoemi Gaeshi".

The album hit No. 1 on Oricon's weekly album chart.

== Track listing ==
Side A
No.	Title	Writer(s)	Length
1.	"Open Sesame" (Performed by MMP)	Ronald Bell; Kool & the Gang	5:46
2.	"Jupiter"	Maurice White; Verdine White; Larry Dunn; Phillip Bailey	2:51
3.	"Do It (Use Your Love)"	Y. Soryo; Sheila Ferguson	3:32
4.	"Play That Funky Music"	Rob Parissi	3:14
5.	"Fantasy"	M. White; V. White; Eddie del Barrio	4:53
6.	"Going in Circles"	Jaiananda; Ted Myers	6:36

Side B
No.	Title	Lyrics	Music	Length
1.	"Candies" (Kyandīzu (キャンディーズ))	Michio Yamagami	Hiroshi Miyagawa	2:45
2.	"Koi no Ayatsuri Ningyō" ((恋のあやつり人形; "Love Doll"))	Machiko Ryū		3:19
3.	"Heart Dorobō" (Hāto Dorobō (ハート泥棒; "Thief of Hearts"))	Haruo Hayashi	Koichi Sugiyama	1:44
4.	"Candy Twist" (Kyandi Tsuisuto (キャンディ・ツイスト))	Yukinojo Mori	Makaino	3:40
5.	"It's Vain Try to Love You Again"	Miki Fujimura	Fujimura; Shigeki Watanabe	3:31
6.	"Kaimono Boogie" (Kaimono Bugi (買い物ブギ; "Shopping Boogie"))	Fujimura	Fujimura; Naoki Yamada	3:10
7.	"Antique Doll" (Antikku Dōru (アンティック ドール))	Ran Itō	Itō; Watanabe	4:43
8.	"Gozenreiji no Shōnan-dōro" ((午前零時の湘南道路; "Shōnan Road at Midnight"))	Yoshiko Tanaka	Tanaka; Watanabe	3:26

Side C
No.	Title	Lyrics	Music	Length
1.	"Super Candies" (Performed by MMP)	Mori	Ichirō Nitta	4:43
2.	"Heart no Ace ga Detekonai" (Hāto no Ēsu ga Detekonai (ハートのエースが出てこない; "Show the Ace of Hearts"))	Ryū	Kōichi Morita	2:42
3.	"Sono Ki ni Sasenaide" ((その気にさせないで; "Don't Come On to Me"))	Kazuya Senke	Yūsuke Hoguchi	2:43
4.	"Abunai Doyōbi" ((危い土曜日; "Perilous Saturday"))	Kazumi Yasui	Morita	2:25
5.	"Un, Deux, Trois" (An, Du, Torowa (アン・ドゥ・トロワ; "One, Two, Three"))	Makoto Kitajō	Takuro Yoshida	3:43
6.	"Wana" ((わな; "Trap"))	Takemi Shima	Hoguchi	3:13
7.	"Aishū no Symphony" (Aishū no Shinfonī (哀愁のシンフォニー; "Symphony of Sorrow"))	Rei Nakanishi	Takashi Miki	3:29
8.	"Kanashiki Tameiki" ((悲しきためいき; "A Sad Sigh"))	Michio Yamagami	Miyagawa	3:14

Side D
No.	Title	Lyrics	Music	Length
1.	"Hohoemi Gaeshi" ((微笑がえし; "Smiling Back"))	Yoko Aki	Hoguchi	4:23
2.	"Toshishita no Otokonoko" ((年下の男の子; "A Younger Boy"))	Senke	Hoguchi	2:25
3.	"Haru Ichiban" ((春一番; "Spring's First Breeze"))	Hoguchi	Hoguchi	3:55
4.	"Dancing Jumping Love" (Danshingu Janpingu Rabu (ダンシィング・ジャンピング・ラブ))	Mori	Kōji Nishimura	11:00
5.	"Tsubasa" ((つばさ; "Wings"))	Itō	Watanabe	10:30

Side E
No.	Title	Lyrics	Music	Arrangement	Length
1.	"Hohoemi Gaeshi" (Single Version)	Aki	Hoguchi	Hoguchi	4:02
2.	"Inspiration Game" (Insupirēshon Gēmu (インスピレーション・ゲーム))	Aki	Hoguchi	Hoguchi	3:04
3.	"100% Pure Lady" (Hyaku Pāsento Pyua Redi (100%ピュア・レディ))	Takemi Shima	Hoguchi	Hoguchi	3:22
4.	"Wana" (Single Version)	Shima	Hoguchi	Hoguchi	4:36
5.	"Curtain Call" (Kāten Kōru (かーてん・こーる))	Aki	Hoguchi	Hoguchi	5:01
6.	"Good Bye Times" (Guddo Bai Taimusu (グッド・バイ・タイムス))	Aki	Hoguchi	Hoguchi	4:32

Side F
No.	Title	Lyrics	Music	Arrangement	Length
1.	"Sayonara Candies" (Sayonara Kyandīzu (さよならキャンディーズ; "Farewell Candies"))	Isao Matsukane	Watanabe	MMP	4:16
2.	"Stop!"	Fujimura	Fujimura; Shinji Nishi	MMP	2:16
3.	"Ikenai Hito" ((いけない人; "A Bad Person"))	Tanaka	Tanaka; Watanabe	Watanabe	3:40
4.	"Hesomagari" ((へそ曲がり; "Navel Curve"))	Itō	Itō; Watanabe	Watanabe	3:38
5.	"Sexy"	Fujimura	Fujimura; Watanabe	Watanabe	5:03
6.	"Doyōbi no Yoru" ((土曜日の夜; "Saturday Night"))	Tanaka	Tanaka; Nishi	Hoguchi	7:19

== Personnel ==
- Candies

- Ran Itō
- Miki Fujimura
- Yoshiko "Sue" Tanaka

- Music Mates Players (MMP) (ミュージック・メイツ・プレイヤーズ, Myūjikku Meitsu Pureiyāzu)

- Shigeki Watanabe – keyboard
- Kōji Nishimura – guitar
- Shōichi Kawauchi – drums
- Ichirō Nitta – trumpet
- Junichi Kanezaki – trumpet
- Kōji Katayama – saxophone
- Yuki Sugawara – percussion

== Chart positions ==
Chart (1978)	Peak position
Japanese Oricon Albums Chart	1

== See also ==
- 1978 in Japanese music
