= Candies' Carnival for 10,000 People =

Live album by Candies
- Released: December 21, 1975
- Recorded: October 19, 1975
- Venue: Kuramae Kokugikan
- Genres: Kayōkyoku; teen pop
- Length: 40:15
- Languages: Japanese; English
- Label: CBS Sony
- Producers: Sumio Matsuzaki; Masatoshi Sakai

Candies chronology
Candies Best Hits (1975)	Candies' Carnival for 10,000 People (1975)	Haru Ichiban (1976)

Candies' Carnival for 10,000 People (キャンディーズ10,000人カーニバル, Kyandīzu Ichiman-nin Kānibaru) is the first live album by Japanese idol trio Candies. Recorded live at the Kuramae Kokugikan on October 19, 1975, the album was released through CBS Sony on December 21, 1975.

== Track listing ==
Side A
No.	Title	Lyrics	Music	Length
1.	"Anata ni Muchū" ((あなたに夢中; "Crazy for You"))	Michio Yamagami	Kōichi Morita	2:20
2.	"Abunai Doyōbi" ((危い土曜日; "Perilous Saturday"))	Kazumi Yasui	Morita	2:28
3.	"Uchiki na Aitsu" ((内気なあいつ; "Shy Guy"))	Kazuya Senke	Yūsuke Hoguchi	3:30
4.	"Bye Bye Sentimental" (Bai Bai Senchimentaru (バイ・バイ・センチメンタル))	Machiko Ryū	Hoguchi	4:34
5.	"Kataomoi no Gogo" ((片想いの午後; "An Unrequited Afternoon"))	Ryū	Hoguchi	4:09
6.	"Kanashiki Tameiki" ((悲しきためいき; "A Sad Sigh"))	Yamagami	Hiroshi Miyagawa	2:39

Side B
No.	Title	Lyrics	Music	Length
1.	"Sono Ki ni Sasenaide" ((その気にさせないで; "Don't Come On to Me"))	Senke	Hoguchi	5:11
2.	"Toshishita no Otokonoko" ((年下の男の子; "A Younger Boy"))	Senke	Hoguchi	3:22
3.	"Proud Mary" (Puraudo Mearī (プラウド・メアリー))	John Fogerty; Ryū	Fogerty	8:41
4.	"I Believe in Music" (Ai Birību in Myūjikku (アイ・ビリーブ・イン・ミュージック))	Mac Davis; Kenji Sawada	Davis	6:20

== Personnel ==
- Candies

- Ran Itō
- Miki Fujimura
- Yoshiko "Sue" Tanaka

- Music Mates Players (MMP) (ミュージック・メイツ・プレイヤーズ, Myūjikku Meitsu Pureiyāzu)

- Shigeki Watanabe – keyboard
- Kōji Nishimura – guitar
- Shōichi Kawauchi – drums
- Ichirō Nitta – trumpet
- Junichi Kanezaki – trumpet
- Kōji Katayama – saxophone
- Yuki Sugawara – percussion

== See also ==
- 1975 in Japanese music
