= 1976 in Japanese music =

Japanese music accounted for fifty-eight percent of record sales in the Japanese music market in 1976 (Shōwa 51), the rest being sales of foreign music. During that year, Japan continued to have the second largest music market in the world.

== Awards, contests and festivals ==
The 19th Osaka International Festival (Japanese: 大阪国際フェスティバル) was held from 7 May to 21 May 1976. The 11th Yamaha Popular Song Contest was held on 16 May 1976. The 5th Tokyo Music Festival was held on 27 June 1976. The 12th Yamaha Popular Song Contest was held on 3 October 1976. The final of the 7th World Popular Song Festival was held on 21 November 1976. The 9th Japan Cable Awards were held on 5 December 1976. The final of the 5th FNS Music Festival was held on 21 December 1976. The 18th Japan Record Awards were held on 31 December 1976. The 27th NHK Kōhaku Uta Gassen was held on 31 December 1976.

The 25th Otaka prize was won by Ryōhei Hirose and Maki Ishii.

== Concerts ==
Minako Yoshida's "Minako's Week" began on 1 March 1976.

== Number one singles ==
Oricon

The following reached number 1 on the weekly Oricon Singles Chart:

Issue date	Song	Artist(s)
5 January	"Oyoge! Taiyaki-kun"	Masato Shimon
12 January	"Oyoge! Taiyaki-kun"	Masato Shimon
19 January	"Oyoge! Taiyaki-kun"	Masato Shimon
26 January	"Oyoge! Taiyaki-kun"	Masato Shimon
2 February	"Oyoge! Taiyaki-kun"	Masato Shimon
9 February	"Oyoge! Taiyaki-kun"	Masato Shimon
16 February	"Oyoge! Taiyaki-kun"	Masato Shimon
23 February	"Oyoge! Taiyaki-kun"	Masato Shimon
1 March	"Oyoge! Taiyaki-kun"	Masato Shimon
8 March	"Oyoge! Taiyaki-kun"	Masato Shimon
15 March	"Oyoge! Taiyaki-kun"	Masato Shimon
22 March	"Beautiful Sunday"; Japanese title: (ビューティフル・サンデー)	Daniel Boone
29 March	"Beautiful Sunday"; Japanese title: (ビューティフル・サンデー)	Daniel Boone
5 April	"Beautiful Sunday"; Japanese title: (ビューティフル・サンデー)	Daniel Boone
12 April	"Beautiful Sunday"; Japanese title: (ビューティフル・サンデー)	Daniel Boone
19 April	"Beautiful Sunday"; Japanese title: (ビューティフル・サンデー)	Daniel Boone
26 April	"Beautiful Sunday"; Japanese title: (ビューティフル・サンデー)	Daniel Boone
3 May	"Beautiful Sunday"; Japanese title: (ビューティフル・サンデー)	Daniel Boone
10 May	"Beautiful Sunday"; Japanese title: (ビューティフル・サンデー)	Daniel Boone
17 May	"Beautiful Sunday"; Japanese title: (ビューティフル・サンデー)	Daniel Boone
24 May	"Beautiful Sunday"; Japanese title: (ビューティフル・サンデー)	Daniel Boone
31 May	"Beautiful Sunday"; Japanese title: (ビューティフル・サンデー)	Daniel Boone
7 June	"Beautiful Sunday"; Japanese title: (ビューティフル・サンデー)	Daniel Boone
14 June	"Beautiful Sunday"; Japanese title: (ビューティフル・サンデー)	Daniel Boone
21 June	"Beautiful Sunday"; Japanese title: (ビューティフル・サンデー)	Daniel Boone
28 June	"Beautiful Sunday"; Japanese title: (ビューティフル・サンデー)	Daniel Boone
5 July	"Yokosuka Story"	Momoe Yamaguchi
12 July	"Yokosuka Story"	Momoe Yamaguchi
19 July	"Yokosuka Story"	Momoe Yamaguchi
26 July	"Yokosuka Story"	Momoe Yamaguchi
2 August	"Yokosuka Story"	Momoe Yamaguchi
9 August	"Yokosuka Story"	Momoe Yamaguchi
16 August	"Yokosuka Story"	Momoe Yamaguchi
23 August	"Anata Dake wo"	Teruhiko Aoi
30 August	"Anata Dake wo"	Teruhiko Aoi
6 September	"Anata Dake wo"	Teruhiko Aoi
13 September	"Anata Dake wo"	Teruhiko Aoi
20 September	"Anata Dake wo"	Teruhiko Aoi
27 September	"Anata Dake wo"	Teruhiko Aoi
4 October	"Pearl Color ni Yurete"	Momoe Yamaguchi
11 October	"Pearl Color ni Yurete"	Momoe Yamaguchi
18 October	"Pearl Color ni Yurete"	Momoe Yamaguchi
25 October	"Pearl Color ni Yurete"	Momoe Yamaguchi
1 November	"Pearl Color ni Yurete"	Momoe Yamaguchi
8 November	"Ochiba ga Yuki ni"	Akira Fuse
15 November	"Abayo"	Naoko Ken
22 November	"Abayo"	Naoko Ken
29 November	"Abayo"	Naoko Ken
6 December	"Kita no Yadokara"	Harumi Miyako
13 December	"Abayo"	Naoko Ken
20 December	"Kita no Yadokara"	Harumi Miyako
27 December	"Kita no Yadokara"	Harumi Miyako

== Number one albums and LPs ==
Cash Box

The following reached number 1 on the Cash Box LPs chart:

- 10 January, 17 January, 31 January, 7 February, 14 February and 28 February: Akira Fuse Best Album Katamuyita Michishirube (Japanese: 布施明 ベスト・アルバム 傾いた道しるべ) - Akira Fuse Cf. the single Katamuyita Michishirube.
- 6 March: Cobalt Hour - Yumi Arai
- 27 March, 10 April, 17 April, 24 April and 19 June: Grape Live Sannenzaka - Grape
- 1 May, 8 May, 15 May, 5 June and 12 June: Shōtaijō no Nai Show - Yōsui Inoue
- 26 June, 10 July, 17 July and 24 July: Asuni Mukatte Hashire - Takuro Yoshida
- 31 July: Michikusa - Kei Ogura
- 7 August, 14 August, 21 August, 28 August, 23 October and 13 November: Yuming Brand - Yumi Arai
- 11 September, 18 September, 25 September, 2 October, 9 October, 16 October and 30 October: Omoide No Kakere - Masatoshi Nakamura
- 6 November and 27 November: Ai No Yoyin (Japanese: 愛の余韻) - Janis Ian
- 20 November: Nanika Yiyiwasuretayoode - Akira Inaba
- 4 December and 11 December: Dedication - Bay City Rollers
- 18 December and 25 December: Toozakaru Fukeyi - Kei Ogura

Oricon

The following reached number 1 on the Oricon LP chart:

- 12 January, 19 January, 26 January, 2 February and 9 February: Akira Fuse Best Album Katamuyita Michishirube (Japanese: 布施明 ベスト・アルバム 傾いた道しるべ)
- 16 February: Tokiwa Nagarete - Kaze
- 23 February, 1 March, 8 March, 15 March, 22 March and 29 March: Oyoge! Taiyaki-kun (Japanese: およげ!たいやきくん)
- 5 April, 12 April, 19 April, 26 April, 3 May, 10 May, 17 May, 24 May and 31 May: Shōtaijō no Nai Show - Yōsui Inoue
- 7 June, 14 June and 21 June: Asuni Mukatte Hashire - Takuro Yoshida
- 28 June and 5 July: Michikusa - Kei Ogura
- 12 July, 19 July, 26 July, 2 August and 11 October: Yuming Brand - Yumi Arai
- 9 August, 16 August, 23 August, 30 August, 6 September, 13 September, 20 September, 27 September and 4 October: Omoide No Kakere - Masatoshi Nakamura
- 18 October and 25 October: Ai No Yoyin (Japanese: 愛の余韻) - Janis Ian
- 1 November, 8 November and 15 November: Dedication - Bay City Rollers
- 22 November: Christmas - Hitoshi Komuro, Takuro Yoshida, Yōsui Inoue and Shigeru Izumiya
- 29 November, 13 December, 20 December and 27 December: Toozakaru Fukeyi - Kei Ogura
- 6 December: The 14th Moon (Jūyonbanme no Tsuki) - Yumi Arai

== Annual charts ==
Daniel Boone's Beautiful Sunday was number 1 in the Cash Box annual singles chart. Grape's Sannenzaka was number 1 in the Cash Box annual LPs chart. Masato Shimon's Oyoge! Taiyaki-kun was number 1 in the Oricon annual singles chart.

== Film and television ==
The music of The Inugami Family, by Yuji Ohno, won the 31st Mainichi Film Award for Best Music.

== Genres ==
The singles market was 56% pops, 26% new music and 10% kayōkyoku and enka.

== Songs ==
- Yume De Aetara

== Debuts ==
There were 416 debuts in 1976. The number of re-debuts was 87.

- 21 May: Mari & Bux Bunny (Mari Kaneko's band)
- 20 December: Bow Wow released Hoero! Bow Wow

== Other singles released ==
- Heart Dorobō by Candies
- Pepper Keibu and S.O.S. by Pink Lady
- 1 March: Haru Ichiban by Candies
- 1 May: Wink De Sayonara by Kenji Sawada
- 31 May: Natsu ga Kita! by Candies
- 5 July: Douzo Konomama by Keiko Maruyama
- 21 August: Seishun Jidai by Koichi Morita & Top Gallant
- 21 November: Aishū no Symphony by Candies

== Other albums released ==
- Haru Ichiban, Natsu ga Kita!, Kuramae Kokugikan Carnival for 10,000 People Vol. 2: Candies Live by Candies
- Hana Kuyō–Sanbyaku Rokujū Go Nichi Koi Moyō by Sayuri Ishikawa
- Minna Itte Shimatta by Miyuki Nakajima
- Bon Voyage co. by Haruomi Hosono
- Seychelles by Masayoshi Takanaka
- Scenery by Ryo Fukui
- 25 September: Char by Char

== See also ==
- Timeline of Japanese music
- 1976 in Japan
- 1976 in music
- w:ja:1976年の音楽
