= 1975 in Japanese music =

Japanese music accounted for fifty-eight percent of record sales in the Japanese music market in 1975 (Shōwa 50), the rest being sales of foreign music. During that year, Japan continued to have the second largest music market in the world.

== Awards, contests and festivals ==
The 18th Osaka International Festival (Japanese: 大阪国際フェスティバル) was held from 7 April to 28 April 1975. The 9th Yamaha Popular Song Contest was held on 18 May 1975. The 4th Tokyo Music Festival was held on 13 July 1975. The final of the 3rd FNS Music Festival was held on 17 July 1975. The 1st Nippon Television Music Festival was held on 21 August 1975. The 10th Yamaha Popular Song Contest was held on 12 October 1975. The final of the 6th World Popular Song Festival was held on 16 November 1975. The final of the 4th FNS Music Festival was held on 16 December 1975. The 17th Japan Record Awards were held on 31 December 1975. The 26th NHK Kōhaku Uta Gassen was held on 31 December 1975.

The 24th Otaka prize was won by Tōru Takemitsu.

== Number one singles ==
Oricon

The following reached number 1 on the weekly Oricon Singles Chart:

Issue date	Song	Artist(s)
6 January	"Fuyu no Iro"	Momoe Yamaguchi
13 January	"Fuyu no Iro"	Momoe Yamaguchi
20 January	"Fuyu no Iro"	Momoe Yamaguchi
27 January	"Fuyu no Iro"	Momoe Yamaguchi
3 February	"Hajimete no Dekigoto"	Junko Sakurada
10 February	"Shitetsu Ensen"	Goro Noguchi
17 February	"Shitetsu Ensen"	Goro Noguchi
24 February	"Shitetsu Ensen"	Goro Noguchi
3 March	"22-sai no Wakare"	Kaze
10 March	"22-sai no Wakare"	Kaze
17 March	"22-sai no Wakare"	Kaze
24 March	"22-sai no Wakare"	Kaze
31 March	"Waga Yoki Tomoyo"	Hiroshi Kamayatsu
7 April	"Waga Yoki Tomoyo"	Hiroshi Kamayatsu
14 April	"Waga Yoki Tomoyo"	Hiroshi Kamayatsu
21 April	"Waga Yoki Tomoyo"	Hiroshi Kamayatsu
28 April	"Showa Kare Susuki"	Sakura & Ichiro
5 May	"Showa Kare Susuki"	Sakura & Ichiro
12 May	"Showa Kare Susuki"	Sakura & Ichiro
19 May	"Cyclamen no Kaori"	Akira Fuse
26 May	"Cyclamen no Kaori"	Akira Fuse
2 June	"Cyclamen no Kaori"	Akira Fuse
9 June	"Cyclamen no Kaori"	Akira Fuse
16 June	"Cyclamen no Kaori"	Akira Fuse
23 June	"Kakkoman Boogie / Minato no Yoko Yokohama Yokosuka"	Down Town Boogie Woogie Band
30 June	"Kakkoman Boogie / Minato no Yoko Yokohama Yokosuka"	Down Town Boogie Woogie Band
7 July	"Kakkoman Boogie / Minato no Yoko Yokohama Yokosuka"	Down Town Boogie Woogie Band
14 July	"Kakkoman Boogie / Minato no Yoko Yokohama Yokosuka"	Down Town Boogie Woogie Band
21 July	"Kakkoman Boogie / Minato no Yoko Yokohama Yokosuka"	Down Town Boogie Woogie Band
28 July	"Kokoro Nokori"	Takashi Hosokawa
4 August	"Kokoro Nokori"	Takashi Hosokawa
11 August	"Kokoro Nokori"	Takashi Hosokawa
18 August	"Kokoro Nokori"	Takashi Hosokawa
25 August	"Omoide Makura"	Kyoko Kosaka
1 September	"Romance"	Hiromi Iwasaki
8 September	"Romance"	Hiromi Iwasaki
15 September	"Romance"	Hiromi Iwasaki
22 September	"Toki no Sugiyuku Mama ni"	Kenji Sawada
29 September	"Toki no Sugiyuku Mama ni"	Kenji Sawada
6 October	"Toki no Sugiyuku Mama ni"	Kenji Sawada
13 October	"Toki no Sugiyuku Mama ni"	Kenji Sawada
20 October	"Toki no Sugiyuku Mama ni"	Kenji Sawada
27 October	"Ichigo Hakusho wo Mou Ichido"	Bang Bang
3 November	"Ichigo Hakusho wo Mou Ichido"	Bang Bang
10 November	"Ichigo Hakusho wo Mou Ichido"	Bang Bang
17 November	"Ichigo Hakusho wo Mou Ichido"	Bang Bang
24 November	"Ichigo Hakusho wo Mou Ichido"	Bang Bang
1 December	"Ichigo Hakusho wo Mou Ichido"	Bang Bang
8 December	"Sentimental"	Hiromi Iwasaki
15 December	"Sentimental"	Hiromi Iwasaki
22 December	"Ano Hi ni Kaeritai"	Yumi Arai
29 December	"Ano Hi ni Kaeritai"	Yumi Arai

== Number one albums and LPs ==
Cash Box

The following reached number 1 on the Cash Box LPs chart:

- 4 January, 25 January and 1 March: Nishoku no Koma - Yōsui Inoue
- 8 February, 15 February, 8 March, 15 March, 3 May, 10 May, 17 May and 28 June: Kōri no Sekai - Yōsui Inoue
- 29 March, 12 April, 19 April and 26 April: Sekai No Koibito (Japanese: 世界の恋人) - The Three Degrees
- 5 April, 7 June and 14 June: the Kaguyahime forever - Kaguyahime
- 21 June: Zoku Datsu Donzoko (Japanese: 続 脱・どん底) - Downtown Boogie Woogie Band
- 12 July: First Album - Kaze
- 19 July, 2 August, 9 August, 16 August, 23 August and 30 August: Midori No Chiheisen (Japanese: 緑の地平線) - The Carpenters
- 13 September, 27 September, 4 October and 18 October: Shikuramen No Kaorikara - Akira Fuse
- 25 October: Good Pages - Yōsui Inoue
- 1 November, 8 November, 15 November, 22 November, 29 November, 6 December, 20 December and 27 December: Yumeoibito - Kei Ogura

Oricon

The following reached number 1 on the Oricon LP chart:

- 20 January and 27 January: Imawa Mada Jinsei Wo Katarazu - Takuro Yoshida
- 3 February, 10 February, 17 February, 24 February, 3 March, 10 March, 7 April, 14 April, 21 April, 28 April, 5 May, 12 May, 19 May and 2 June: Kōri no Sekai - Yōsui Inoue
- 17 March, 24 March and 31 March: the Kaguyahime forever - Kaguyahime
- 26 May and 9 June: Zoku Datsu Donzoko (Japanese: 続 脱・どん底) - Downtown Boogie Woogie Band
- 16 June and 23 June: First Album - Kaze
- 30 June, 7 July, 14 July, 21 July and 28 July: Midori No Chiheisen (Japanese: 緑の地平線) - The Carpenters
- 4 August, 11 August and 18 August: Good Pages - Yōsui Inoue
- 25 August, 1 September, 8 September, 15 September, 22 September, 29 September and 6 October: Shikuramen No Kaorikara - Akira Fuse
- 13 October, 20 October, 27 October, 3 November, 10 November, 17 November, 24 November, 1 December, 8 December and 15 December: Yumeoibito - Kei Ogura
- 22 December and 29 December: Akira Fuse Best Album Katamuyita Michishirube (Japanese: 布施明 ベスト・アルバム 傾いた道しるべ) - Akira Fuse (Cf. the single Katamuyita Michishirube)

== Annual charts ==
Akira Fuse's Shikuramen No Kaori was number 1 in the Cash Box annual singles chart. Yōsui Inoue's Kōri no Sekai was number 1 in the Cash Box annual albums chart.

Sakura & Ichiro's Showa Kare Susuki was number 1 in the Oricon annual singles chart.

== Film and television ==
The music of The Fossil, by Tōru Takemitsu, won the 30th Mainichi Film Award for Best Music.

== Music industry ==
There were 44,000 jukeboxes. RVC was established. Most CD-4 records were Japanese.

== Overseas ==
The Sadistic Mika Band toured Great Britain. They departed on 22 September 1975 and returned on 27 October 1975. They appeared on the Old Grey Whistle Test.

== Other singles released ==
- Rūju no Dengon by Yumi Arai
- Toshishita no Otokonoko, Uchiki na Aitsu, Sono Ki ni Sasenaide and Heart no Ace ga Detekonai by Candies
- Oyoge! Taiyaki-kun by Masato Shimon
- Kita no Yadokara by Harumi Miyako
- Jidai by Miyuki Nakajima
- 20 February: Apartment No Kagi (Japanese: アパートの鍵) by Asami Kobayashi
- 1 August: Mayonaka No Angel Baby (Japanese: 真夜中のエンジェル・ベイビー」がリリース) by Miki Hirayama

== Other albums released ==
- Cobalt Hour by Yumi Arai
- Toshishita no Otokonoko, Candies Deluxe, Sono Ki ni Sasenaide and Candies' Carnival for 10,000 People by Candies
- Tropical Dandy by Haruomi Hosono
- Prism by Ryo Kawasaki
- Band Wagon by Shigeru Suzuki
- 25 January: Horo by Chu Kosaka
- 1 April: West Road Blues Band released their debut album "Blues Power" (Japanese: ブルーズパワー)
- 25 April: Songs by Sugar Babe
- 1 November: Hawaii Champroo (Japanese: ハワイ・チャンプルー) by Makoto Kubota & The Sunset Gang (Japanese: 久保田麻琴と夕焼け楽団, Makoto Kubota To Yūyake Gakudan)

== See also ==
- Timeline of Japanese music
- 1975 in Japan
- 1975 in music
- w:ja:1975年の音楽
