= Candies Deluxe =

Compilation album by Candies
- Released: June 1, 1975
- Recorded: 1973–1975
- Genres: Kayōkyoku; teen pop
- Languages: Japanese; English
- Label: CBS Sony
- Producers: Sumio Matsuzaki; Masatoshi Sakai

Candies chronology
Toshishita no Otokonoko (1975)	Candies Deluxe (1975)	Sono ki ni Sasenaide (1975)

Candies Deluxe (キャンディーズ・デラックス, Kyandīzu Derakkusu) is a compilation album by Japanese idol trio Candies, released through CBS Sony on June 1, 1975. The two-disc album covers the trio's singles and songs from 1973 to 1975.

== Track listing ==
Side A
No.	Title	Lyrics	Music	Arrangement	Length
1.	"Toshishita no Otokonoko" ((年下の男の子; "A Younger Boy"))	Kazuya Senke	Yūsuke Hoguchi	Hoguchi
2.	"Soyokaze no Kuchizuke" ((そよ風のくちづけ; "Kiss of the Gentle Breeze"))	Michio Yamagami	Kōichi Morita	Hoguchi
3.	"Anata ni Muchū" ((あなたに夢中; "Crazy for You"))	Yamagami	Morita	Kōji Ryūzaki
4.	"Namida no Kisetsu" ((なみだの季節; "Season of Tears"))	Senke	Hoguchi	Hoguchi
5.	"Watashi Dake no Kanashimi" ((私だけの悲しみ; "Only My Sorrow"))	Senke	Hoguchi	Hoguchi
6.	"Abunai Doyōbi" ((危い土曜日; "Perilous Saturday"))	Kazumi Yasui	Morita	Ryūzaki

Side B
No.	Title	Lyrics	Music	Arrangement	Length
1.	"Candies" (Kyandīzu (キャンディーズ))	Yamagami	Hiroshi Miyagawa	Miyagawa
2.	"I Believe in Music" (Ai Birību in Myūjikku (アイ・ビリーブ・イン・ミュージック))	Mac Davis; Kenji Sawada	Davis	Hoguchi
3.	"Sugar Baby Love" (Shugā Beibī Ravu (シュガー・ベイビー・ラヴ))	Wayne Bickerton; Tony Waddington; Yamagami	Bickerton; Waddington	Hoguchi
4.	"California Dreamin'" (Yume no Kariforunia (夢のカリフォルニア))	John Phillips; Michelle Phillips	J. Phillips; M. Phillips	Ryūzaki
5.	"Stupid Cupid" (Manuke na Kyūpitto (まぬけなキューピット))	Howard Greenfield; Candies	Neil Sedaka	Hoguchi
6.	"Yesterday Once More" (Iesutadei Wansu Moa (イエスタデイ・ワンス・モア))	Richard Carpenter; John Bettis	Carpenter; Bettis	Ryūzaki

Side C
No.	Title	Lyrics	Music	Arrangement	Length
1.	"Mayoeru Hitsuji" ((迷える羊; "Lost Sheep"))	Senke	Hoguchi	Hoguchi
2.	"Ano Hito Amanojaku" ((あのひとあまのじゃく) "That Person Is a Pervert")	Senke	Hoguchi	Hoguchi
3.	"Namida Sō" ((なみだ草; "Grass Tears"))	Yamagami	Morita	Ryūzaki
4.	"Uchiki na Toshigoro" ((内気なとしごろ) "Shy Age")	Yamagami	Miyagawa	Miyagawa
5.	"Sotsugyō" ((卒業; "Graduation"))	Tetsuya Chiaki	Tadao Inoue	Hoguchi
6.	"Kanashiki Tameiki" ((悲しきためいき; "A Sad Sigh"))	Yamagami	Miyagawa	Ryūzaki

Side D
No.	Title	Lyrics	Music	Arrangement	Length
1.	"Kizutsukusedai" ((傷つく世代; "A Generation to Be Hurt"))	Mieko Arima	Kyōhei Tsutsumi	Ryūzaki
2.	"Anata e no Ai" ((あなたへの愛; "Love For You"))	Kazumi Yasui	Kunihiko Kase	Ryūzaki
3.	"Ai e no Start" (Ai e no Sutāto (愛への出発(スタート); "The Start of Love"))	Tokiko Iwatani	Tsutsumi	Ryūzaki
4.	"Green, Green Grass of Home" (Omoide no Gurīn Gurasu (想い出のグリーン・グラス))	Curly Putman; Yamagami	Putman	Hoguchi
5.	"Kaze" ((風; "Wind"))	Osamu Kitayama	Norihiko Hashida	Hoguchi
6.	"Kaerazaru Hi no Tame ni" ((帰らざる日のために; "For the Day of No Return"))	Keisuke Yamakawa	Taku Izumi	Hoguchi

== See also ==
- 1975 in Japanese music
