= 17th Japan Record Awards =

1975 Japanese music awards ceremony

- Date: 31 December 1975
- Venue: Imperial Garden Theater, Tokyo
- Hosted by: Keizo Takahashi, Mitsuko Mori

Television/radio coverage
- Network: TBS

The 17th Annual Japan Record Awards took place at the Imperial Garden Theater in Chiyoda, Tokyo, on 31 December 1975, starting at 7:00PM JST. The primary ceremonies were televised in Japan on TBS.

== Award winners ==
=== Japan Record Award ===
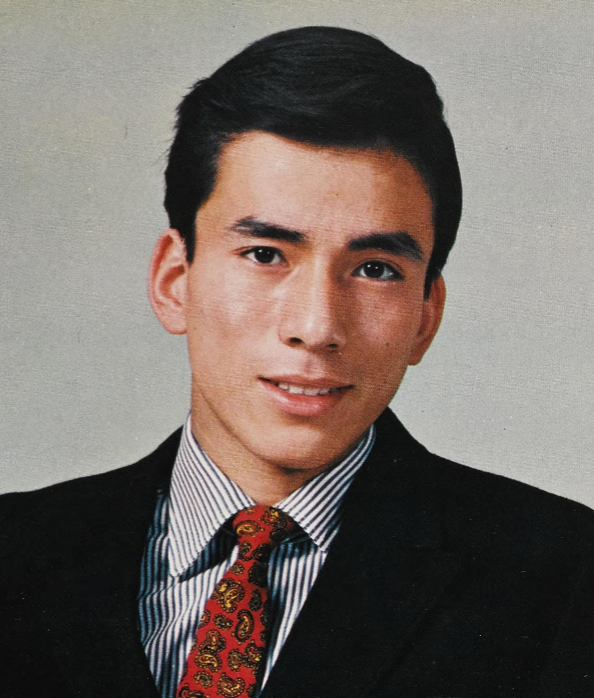
Akira Fuse, awarded JRA, his second award in JRA after awarded Vocalist award last year.

Akira Fuse for "Shikuramen No Kahori"

- Lyricist: Kei Ogura
- Composer: Kei Ogura
- Arranger: Mitsuo Hagida
- Record Company: King Records
  - Second award, awarded Vocalist award last year.

=== Best Vocalist ===
Hiroshi Itsuki for "Chikuma Gawa"

- Awarded again after last year, second-best vocalist award.

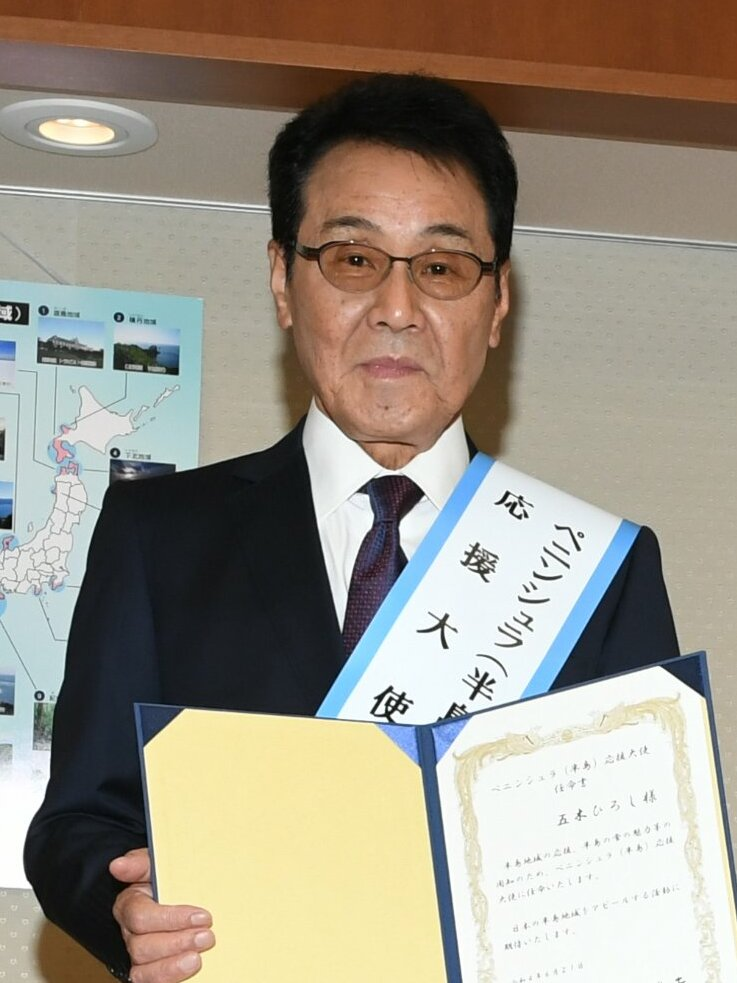
Hiroshi Itsuki, awarded Best Vocalist for second time .

=== Best New Artist ===
Takashi Hosokawa for "Kokoro No Kori"

=== Vocalist Award ===
- Rumiko Koyanagi for "Hanaguruma"
  - Awarded again after 3 years, 2nd vocalist award.
- Goro Noguchi for "Shitetsu Ensen"
- Saori Minami for "Hito Koi Shikute"

=== New Artist Award ===
- Hiromi Iwasaki for "Romance"
- Hiromi Ōta for "Ame Dare"
- Junko Ogawa for "Yoru No Houmonsha"
- Nagisa Katahira for "Utsukushii Chigiri"

=== General Public Award ===
Sakurada Junko for "Juushichi No Natsu" and other hit songs.

=== Composer Award ===
Kouichi Morita for "Geshukuya"

- Singer: Kouichi Morita & Topgalant

=== Arranger Award ===
Mitsuo Hagita for "Soratobu Kujira"

- Singer: Chan Chako

=== Lyricist Award ===
- Yū Aku for "Uba Guruma"
  - Awarded again after 2 years, second lyricist award.
  - Singer: Sugawara Yoichi

=== Special Award ===
- Chiyoko Shimakura
  - Awarded again after 7 years, second special award.
- Frank Nagai
- Yoshio Tabata
- Yūjirō Ishihara
  - Awarded again after 8 years, second special award.

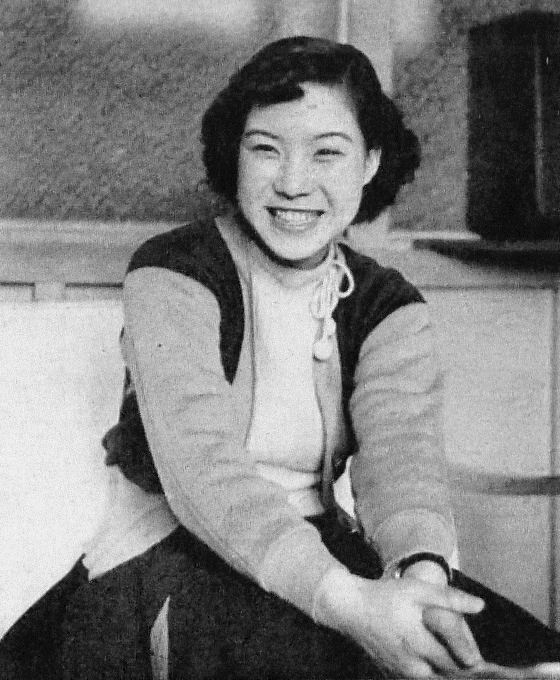
Chiyoko Shimakura, awarded another special award after 7 years.

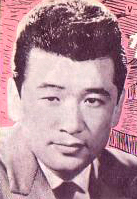
Frank Nagai, special award winner, 5th time awarded in JRA.

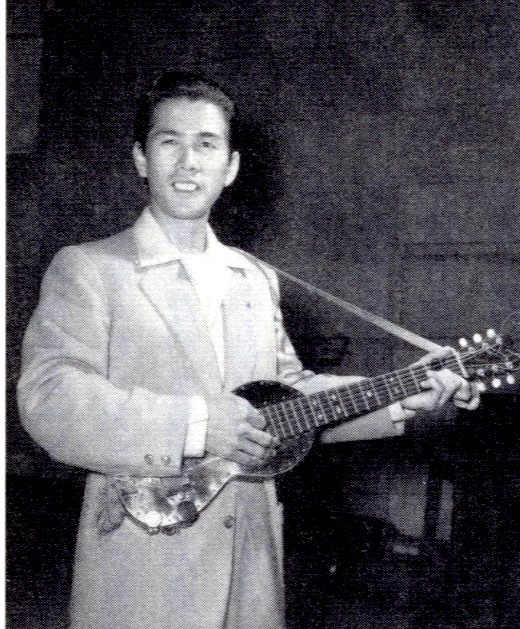
Yoshio Tabata, special award winner.

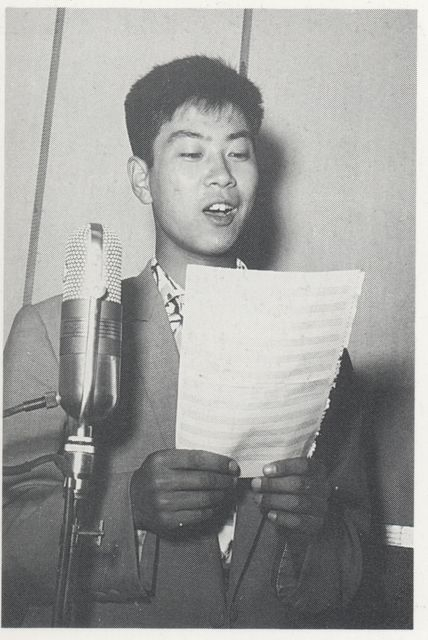
Yūjirō Ishihara, awarded another special award after 8 years.

=== Planning Award ===
- EMI Music Japan for "Minato No Yoko.Yokohama.Yokosuka"
  - Awarded again after 5 years, fifth planning award.
- Isao Tomita and BMG JAPAN for "Mussorgsky/Tenrankai No E"

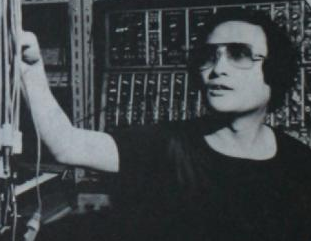
Isao Tomita, awarded planning award.

=== Shinpei Nakayama Award & Yaso Saijō Award ===
Kei Ogura

== Best 10 JRA Nominations ==
5 singers will be chosen for the vocalist award, and the JRA and best vocalist will be chosen from the 5 vocalists that receive the vocalist award.

Song	Singer	Award
Shitetsu Ensen	Goro Noguchi	Vocalist Award
Hanaguruma	Rumiko Koyanagi	Vocalist Award
Shikuramen No Kahori	Akira Fuse	Japan Record Award
Tomoshibi	Aki Yashiro	N/A
Toki No Sugi Yukumamani	Kenji Sawada	N/A
Aa Hito Koishi	Shinichi Mori	N/A
Hito Koi Shikute	Saori Minami	Vocalist Award
Chikuma Gawa	Hiroshi Itsuki	Best Vocalist
Naka No Shima Blues	Hiroshi Uchiyamada and Cool Five	N/A
Kono Ai No Tokimeki	Hideki Saijo	N/A

== See also ==
- 1975 in Japanese music
