= Sōshunfu =

Studio album by Candies
- Released: March 21, 1978
- Recorded: 1977
- Genre: kayōkyoku; teen pop
- Length: 84:07
- Language: Japanese
- Label: CBS Sony
- Producer: Sumio Matsuzaki; Masatoshi Sakai

Candies chronology
Candies 1676 Days (1977)	Sōshunfu (1978)	Candies Final Carnival Plus One (1978)

Sōshunfu (早春譜; lit. Early Spring Record) is the tenth and final studio album by Japanese idol trio Candies, released through CBS Sony on March 21, 1978. The album consists of songs individually written by the trio. It is the trio's only studio release to not generate a single. Two weeks after the album's release, Candies performed their final concert at Korakuen Stadium on April 4 before disbanding.

== Charts ==
This album reached number 2 on the Japanese LPs chart published in Cash Box on 29 April 1978, but no Japanese chart was published the following week.

== Track listing ==
Side A
No.	Title	Lyrics	Music	Arrangement	Length
1.	"Kaimono Boogie" (Kaimono Bugi (買い物ブギ; "Shopping Boogie"))	Miki Fujimura	Fujimura; Naoki Yamada	Yamada & Music Mates Players (MMP)	3:07
2.	"Apron Nee-san (Maki-chan ni Sasageru Uta)" (Epuron Nēsan (Maki-chan ni Sasageru Uta) (エプロン姉さん（マキちゃんに捧げる唄）; "Apron Sister (A Song Dedicated to Maki-chan)"))	Fujimura	Fujimura; Yamada	Katsunori Ishida	3:46
3.	"Neko to Aniki" ((猫と兄貴; "Cat and Brother"))	Fujimura	Fujimura; Yamada	Yamada & MMP	3:29
4.	"Otōsan Anata e" ((おとうさん あなたへ; "To Your Father"))	Fujimura	Fujimura; Yamada	Ishida	5:47
5.	"For Freedom"	Fujimura	Fujimura; Shigeki Watanabe	Yūsuke Hoguchi	4:07

Side B
No.	Title	Lyrics	Music	Arrangement	Length
1.	"Antique Doll" (Antikku Dōru (アンティック ドール))	Ran Itō	Itō; Watanabe	Watanabe	4:34
2.	"Moonlight"	Itō	Itō; Watanabe	Ishida	3:53
3.	"Rōsoku no Akari ni..." ((ろうそくの灯に…; "By Candlelight..."))	Itō	Itō; Yamada	Hoguchi	4:31
4.	"Kagami no Naka de" ((鏡の中で; "In the Mirror"))	Itō	Itō; Yamada	Hoguchi	3:12
5.	"Kanashimi no Heroine" (Kanashimi no Hiroin (悲しみのヒロイン; "Heroine of Sorrow"))	Itō	Itō; Kōji Nishimura	Shinichi Tanabe	6:46

Side C
No.	Title	Lyrics	Music	Arrangement	Length
1.	"Watashi no Kare wo Shōkaishimasu" ((私の彼を紹介します; "I Will Introduce Him to You"))	Yoshiko Tanaka	Tanaka; Shinji Nishi	Ishida	2:40
2.	"Kisetsu no Wakare" ((季節の別れ; "Farewell to the Seasons"))	Tanaka	Tanaka; Nishi	Tanabe	4:19
3.	"Ichibanboshi-san" ((一番星さん; "The Best Star"))	Tanaka	Tanaka; Yamada	Hoguchi	3:29
4.	"Nantonaku" ((なんとなく; "Somehow"))	Tanaka	Tanaka; Nishi	Ishida	4:31
5.	"Gozenreiji no Shōnan-dōro" ((午前零時の湘南道路; "Shōnan Road at Midnight"))	Tanaka	Tanaka; Watanabe	Ishida	3:44

Side D
No.	Title	Lyrics	Music	Arrangement	Length
1.	"Kiiroi Canoe" (Kiiroi Kanū (黄色いカヌー; "Yellow-colored Canoe"))	Itō	Itō; Watanabe	Ishida	4:22
2.	"Sasayaki" ((ささやき; "Whisper"))	Itō	Itō; Watanabe	Hoguchi	3:49
3.	"Please Come Again"	Tanaka	Tanaka; Nishi	Nishi & MMP	3:29
4.	"It's Vain Try to Love You Again"	Fujimura	Fujimura; Watanabe	Hoguchi	4:02
5.	"Akogare" ((あこがれ; "Longing"))	Fujimura	Fujimura; Watanabe	Watanabe	6:30

== See also ==
- 1978 in Japanese music
