= Sono Ki ni Sasenaide =

Sono Ki ni Sasenaide may refer to:

- Sono Ki ni Sasenaide (song), a 1975 song by Candies
- Sono Ki ni Sasenaide (album), a 1975 album by Candies
