= Namida no Kisetsu =

Namida no Kisetsu may refer to:

- Namida no Kisetsu (song), a 1974 song by Candies
- Namida no Kisetsu (album), a 1974 album by Candies
