= Natsu ga Kita! =

Natsu ga Kita! may refer to:

- Natsu ga Kita! (song), a 1976 song by Candies
- Natsu ga Kita! (album), a 1976 album by Candies
