= Haru Ichiban (album) =

Studio album by Candies
- Released: April 1, 1976
- Recorded: 1975
- Genre: kayōkyoku; teen pop
- Length: 39:30
- Language: Japanese
- Label: CBS Sony
- Producer: Sumio Matsuzaki; Masatoshi Sakai

Candies chronology
Candies' Carnival for 10,000 People (1975)	Haru Ichiban (1976)	Natsu ga Kita! (1976)

Singles from Haru Ichiban
- 1. "Heart no Ace ga Detekonai" Released: December 5, 1975; 2. "Haru Ichiban" Released: March 1, 1976

Haru Ichiban (春一番; lit. Spring's First Breeze) is the sixth studio album by Japanese idol trio Candies, released through CBS Sony on April 1, 1976. It contains the single "Heart no Ace ga Detekonai" and a re-recording of the title track, which was originally released on their fourth album Toshishita no Otokonoko.

== Charts ==
This album reached number 10 on the Japanese LPs chart published in Cash Box.

== Track listing ==
All lyrics are written by Machiko Ryū, except where indicated; all music is arranged by Kōji Ryūzaki, except where indicated.

Side A
No.	Title	Lyrics	Music	Arrangement	Length
1.	"Koi wa Fuwafuwa" ((恋はふわふわ; "Love Is Fluffy"))		Kōji Makaino	Makaino	3:50
2.	"Omelet wo Tsukurimashō" (Omuretsu wo Tsukurimashō (オムレツをつくりましょう; "Let's Make an Omelet"))	Yukinojo Mori	Yūsuke Hoguchi	Hoguchi	3:26
3.	"Machibōke" ((待ちぼうけ; "Waiting"))		Mitsuo Miyamoto		3:15
4.	"Naisho no Ohanashi" ((内緒のおはなし; "A Secret Story"))		Hiroshi Miyagawa	Miyagawa	3:20
5.	"Koi no Ayatsuri Ningyō" ((恋のあやつり人形; "Love Doll"))		Makaino	Makaino	3:24
6.	"Haru Ichiban" ((春一番; "Spring's First Breeze"))	Hoguchi	Hoguchi	Hoguchi	3:13

Side B
No.	Title	Lyrics	Music	Arrangement	Length
1.	"Heart no Ace ga Detekonai" (Hāto no Ēsu ga Detekonai (ハートのエースが出てこない; "Show the Ace of Hearts"))		Kōichi Morita		3:11
2.	"Jakuten Misetara Dame yo" ((弱点みせたら駄目よ; "It's Useless If You Show Your Weakness"))	Yū Aku	Tadao Inoue		2:52
3.	"Asa no Hitorigoto" ((朝のひとりごと; "Morning Monologue"))		Miyagawa		3:55
4.	"Koi no Rinji News" (Koi no Rinji Nyūzu (恋の臨時ニュース; "Breaking News of Love"))	Mori	Hoguchi		2:52
5.	"Paper Plane Love"	Mori	Hoguchi	Hoguchi	3:09
6.	"Lucky Chance wo Nigasanaide" (Rakkī Chansu wo Nigasanaide (ラッキーチャンスを逃がさないで; "Don't Miss Your Lucky Chance"))		Miyamoto	Shigeki Watanabe	2:53

== See also ==
- 1976 in Japanese music
