= Uchiki na Aitsu =

Single by Candies

from the album Candies Best Hits
- Language: Japanese
- English title: Shy Guy
- B-side: "Koi no Byōki"
- Released: June 1, 1975
- Recorded: 1975
- Genre: kayōkyoku; teen pop
- Length: 3:20
- Label: CBS Sony
- Composer: Yūsuke Hoguchi
- Lyricist: Kazuya Senke
- Producers: Sumio Matsuzaki; Masatoshi Sakai

Candies singles chronology
"Toshishita no Otokonoko" (1975)	"Uchiki na Aitsu" (1975)	"Sono Ki ni Sasenaide" (1975)

"Uchiki na Aitsu" (内気なあいつ; "Shy Guy") is the sixth single by Japanese music trio Candies. Written by Kazuya Senke and Yūsuke Hoguchi, the single was released on June 1, 1975.

The song peaked at No. 18 on Oricon's singles chart and spent 13 weeks in that chart. It sold over 98,000 copies.

== Track listing ==
All lyrics are written by Kazuya Senke; all music is written and arranged by Yūsuke Hoguchi.

No.	Title	Length
1.	"Uchiki na Aitsu" ((内気なあいつ; "Shy Guy"))	3:20
2.	"Koi no Byōki" ((恋の病気; "Lovesick"))	3:33

== Charts ==
Chart (1975)	Peak position
Japanese Oricon Singles Chart	18

== See also ==
- 1975 in Japanese music
