= Sono Ki ni Sasenaide (album) =

Studio album by Candies
- Released: October 1, 1975
- Recorded: 1974
- Genre: kayōkyoku; teen pop
- Length: 43:30
- Language: Japanese
- Label: CBS Sony
- Producer: Sumio Matsuzaki; Masatoshi Sakai

Candies chronology
Candies Deluxe (1975)	Sono Ki ni Sasenaide (1975)	Candies Best Hits (1975)

Singles from Sono Ki ni Sasenaide
- 1. "Sono Ki ni Sasenaide" Released: September 1, 1975

Sono Ki ni Sasenaide (その気にさせないで; lit. Don't Come On to Me) is the fifth studio album by Japanese idol trio Candies, released through CBS Sony on October 1, 1975. It contains the single "Sono Ki ni Sasenaide".

== Track listing ==
All music is composed and arranged by Yūsuke Hoguchi, except where indicated.

Side A
No.	Title	Lyrics	Music	Arrangement	Length
1.	"Sono Ki ni Sasenaide" ((その気にさせないで; "Don't Come On to Me"))	Kazuya Senke			3:36
2.	"Kataomoi no Gogo" ((片想いの午後; "An Unrequited Afternoon"))	Machiko Ryū			4:09
3.	"Bye Bye Sentimental" (Bai Bai Senchimentaru (バイ・バイ・センチメンタル))	Ryū			4:34
4.	"Ame to Namida to Ano Hito to" ((雨と涙とあのひとと; "Rain and Tears and That Person"))	Senke		Tachio Akano	2:51
5.	"Ogenki Desu ka" ((お元気ですか; "How Are You?"))	Senke	Kunihiko Kase		2:46
6.	"Dore ga Ii Kashira" ((どれがいいかしら; "Which One Is Better?"))	Senke			3:13

Side B
No.	Title	Lyrics	Music	Length
1.	"Futari no Love Train" (Futari no Rabu Torein (二人のラブトレイン; "Our Love Train"))	Miki Fujimura; Ryū	Mitsuo Miyamoto	3:09
2.	"Aki no Sketch" (Aki no Suketchi (秋のスケッチ; "Autumn Sketch"))	Ryū		3:15
3.	"Anata no Kanashimi" ((あなたの悲しみ; "Your Sorrow"))	Senke		2:48
4.	"Koi no Sakusen" ((恋の作戦; "Love Strategy"))	Ryū		3:16
5.	"Kaerenai Yoru" ((帰れない夜; "The Night You Can't Go Home"))	Ryū		6:05
6.	"Ichimai no Glass" (Ichimai no Garasu (一枚のガラス; "A Piece of Glass"))	Senke		3:38

== See also ==
- 1975 in Japanese music
