= Anata ni Muchū: Uchiki na Candies =

Studio album by Candies
- Released: December 5, 1973
- Recorded: 1973
- Genre: kayōkyoku; teen pop
- Length: 36:33
- Language: Japanese
- Label: CBS Sony
- Producer: Sumio Matsuzaki; Masatoshi Sakai

Candies chronology
Anata ni Muchū: Uchiki na Candies (1973)	Abunai Doyōbi: Candies no Sekai (1974)

Singles from Anata ni Muchū: Uchiki na Candies
- 1. "Anata ni Muchū" Released: September 1, 1973

Anata ni Muchū: Uchiki na Candies (あなたに夢中〜内気なキャンディーズ〜, Anata ni Muchū: Uchiki na Kyandīzu; lit. Crazy for You: Shy Candies) is the debut album by Japanese idol trio Candies, released through CBS Sony on December 5, 1973. It contains their debut single "Anata ni Muchū". Side A consists of original recordings while side B features covers of popular 1973 kayōkyoku songs.

== Track listing ==
All lyrics are written by Michio Yamagami, except where indicated; all music is arranged by Kōji Ryūzaki, except where indicated.

Side A
No.	Title	Music	Arrangement	Length
1.	"Candies" (Kyandīzu (キャンディーズ))	Hiroshi Miyagawa	Miyagawa	2:45
2.	"Namida Sō" ((なみだ草; "Grass Tears"))	Kōichi Morita		2:53
3.	"Nusumareta Kuchizuke" ((盗まれたくちづけ; "Stolen Kiss"))	Morita	Yūsuke Hoguchi	3:03
4.	"Uchiki na Toshigoro" ((内気なとしごろ) "Shy Age")	Miyagawa	Miyagawa	2:41
5.	"Hagureta Kobato" ((はぐれた小鳩; "Stray Little Pigeon"))	Morita	Shunichi Makaino	2:55
6.	"Anata ni Muchū" ((あなたに夢中; "Crazy for You"))	Morita		3:13

Side B
No.	Title	Lyrics	Music	Length
1.	"Ai e no Start" (Ai e no Sutāto (愛への出発(スタート); "The Start of Love"))	Tokiko Iwatani	Kyōhei Tsutsumi	3:04
2.	"Kizutsukusedai" ((傷つく世代; "A Generation to Be Hurt"))	Mieko Arima	Tsutsumi	2:42
3.	"Kimi ga Utsukushi Sugite" ((君が美しすぎて; "You're Too Beautiful"))	Kazuya Senke	Makaino	3:45
4.	"Hishochi no Koi" ((避暑地の恋; "Summer Resort Love"))	Haruo Hayashi	Makaino	3:42
5.	"Anata e no Ai" ((あなたへの愛; "Love For You"))	Kazumi Yasui	Kunihiko Kase	2:55
6.	"Sora Ippai no Shiawase" ((空いっぱいの幸せ; "Sky Full of Happiness"))		Morita	2:57

== See also ==
- 1973 in Japanese music
