= Natsu ga Kita! (album) =

Studio album by Candies
- Released: July 21, 1976
- Recorded: 1976
- Genre: kayōkyoku; teen pop
- Length: 45:32
- Language: Japanese
- Label: CBS Sony
- Producer: Sumio Matsuzaki; Masatoshi Sakai

Candies chronology
Haru Ichiban (1976)	Natsu ga Kita! (1976)	Candies Best Hits (1976)

Singles from Natsu ga Kita!
- 1. "Natsu ga Kita!" Released: May 31, 1976

Natsu ga Kita! (夏が来た!; lit. Summer Has Come!) is the seventh studio album by Japanese idol trio Candies, released through CBS Sony on July 21, 1976. It contains the title track as its only single.

== Track listing ==
Side A
No.	Title	Lyrics	Music	Arrangement	Length
1.	"Hello! Candies"	Machiko Ryū	Mitsuo Miyamoto	Motoki Funayama	3:57
2.	"Kiken na Kankei" ((危険な関係; "A Dangerous Relationship"))	Yukinojo Mori	Miyamoto	Funayama	3:07
3.	"Natsu ga Kita!" ((夏が来た!; "Summer Has Come!"))	Yūsuke Hoguchi	Hoguchi	Hoguchi	3:16
4.	"My Love"	Ryū	Masaki Niwa	Funayama	2:55
5.	"Sayonara Bye Bye" (Sayonara Bai Bai (さよならバイバイ))	Kazuo Shiina	Keiichi Suzuki & Moonriders	Suzuki & Moonriders	5:10
6.	"Meguriaete" ((めぐり逢えて; "Meet Me"))	Eiji Takino	Kimio Mizutani	Hiroshi Shibui	4:36

Side B
No.	Title	Lyrics	Music	Arrangement	Length
1.	"Samba Natsu Samba"	Mori	Kōji Makaino	Makaino	2:53
2.	"Yukizuri no Futari" ((行きずりの二人; "Two Random People"))	Takino	Hoguchi	Hoguchi	3:15
3.	"Kisetsu no Sketch" (Kisetsu no Suketchi (季節のスケッチ; "Seasonal Sketches"))	Shiina	Funayama	Funayama	3:43
4.	"Moon Drops"	Kei Tsutsumi	Tōru Okada	Suzuki & Moonriders	4:28
5.	"Ame no Hi ni Gūzen" ((雨の日に偶然; "By Chance on a Rainy Day"))	Tsutsumi	Okada	Funayama	4:44
6.	"Koi wa Surfing ni Notte" (Koi wa Sāfin ni Notte (恋はサーフィンに乗って; "Love Rides on the Surf"))	Ryō Shōji	Tadao Inoue	Kōji Ryūzaki	2:53

== See also ==
- 1976 in Japanese music
