= Hajimete no Dekigoto =

Single by Junko Sakurada

from the album Spoon Ippai no Shiawase
- B-side: "Tokubetsuna Kimochi"
- Released: December 5, 1974
- Genre: Kayōkyoku, J-Pop
- Length: 3:20
- Label: JVC
- Songwriters: Yū Aku, Kōichi Morita

Junko Sakurada singles chronology
"Hana Uranai" (1974)	"Hajimete no Dekigoto" (1974)	"Hitori Aruki" (1975)

"Hajimete no Dekigoto" (はじめての出来事; lit. First Affair) is a song written by lyricist Yū Aku and composer Kōichi Morita, originally recorded and released by idol Junko Sakurada.

Released in December 1974, it became an Oricon number-one hit in February 1975, grossing over 527,000 copies. and becoming the 11th best selling single of that year. She performed this song at the 26th edition of Kohaku Uta Gassen in 1975.

The song was included as a bonus track on the album "Spoon Ippai no Shiawase" (Spoonful of Happiness), the soundtrack to her first film.

== Track listing (7" vinyl) ==
No.	Title	Length
1.	"Hajimete no Dekigoto" (はじめての出来事, "First Affair")	3:20
2.	"Tokubetsuna Kimochi" (特別な気持!, "This Special Feeling")	3:17

== Charts ==
Chart (1975)	Peak position
Japanese Oricon Singles Chart	1

== See also ==
- 1974 in Japanese music
