= Kita no Yadokara =

Single by Harumi Miyako
- Released: December 1, 1975
- Genre: Enka
- Length: 3:47
- Label: Nippon Columbia
- Songwriter: Asei Kobayashi

Harumi Miyako singles chronology
"Nakiwarai" (1975)	"Kita no Yadokara" (1975)	"Tadahitori" (1976)

Kita no Yadokara (北の宿から, Kita no Yadokara; lit. "From an inn of the north") is a song by Japanese enka singer Harumi Miyako. The song won the 18th Japan Record Awards' Grand Prix Award.

It reached number 1 on the Oricon Singles Chart and sold more than 1.4 million copies.

== In popular culture ==
The song played in the Lupin III Part 2 episode "The Great San Francisco Chase", but was removed from International releases that were used on Geneon DVDs and streaming sites for copyright reasons. The song plays as Koichi Zenigata falls asleep to the radio.

== See also ==
- 1975 in Japanese music
