= Namida no Kisetsu (album) =

Studio album by Candies
- Released: December 10, 1974
- Recorded: 1974
- Genres: kayōkyoku; teen pop
- Length: 39:19
- Languages: Japanese; English
- Label: CBS Sony
- Producers: Sumio Matsuzaki; Masatoshi Sakai

Candies chronology
Candies Best Hits (1974)	Namida no Kisetsu (1974)	Toshishita no Otokonoko (1975)

Singles from Namida no Kisetsu
- 1. "Namida no Kisetsu" Released: September 1, 1974

Namida no Kisetsu (なみだの季節; lit. Season of Tears) is the third studio album by Japanese idol trio Candies, released through CBS Sony on December 10, 1974. It contains the single "Namida no Kisetsu". The album features original recordings, covers of kayōkyoku songs, and English and Japanese-language covers of popular western songs.

== Track listing ==
All music is arranged by Yūsuke Hoguchi.

Side A
No.	Title	Lyrics	Music	Length
1.	"Namida no Kisetsu" ((なみだの季節; "Season of Tears"))	Kazuya Senke	Yūsuke Hoguchi	3:46
2.	"Makka na Konomi" ((真っ赤な木の実; "Red Tree Nuts"))	Senke	Hoguchi	3:23
3.	"Sugar Baby Love" (Shugā Beibī Ravu (シュガー・ベイビー・ラヴ))	Wayne Bickerton; Tony Waddington; Michio Yamagami	Bickerton; Waddington	3:54
4.	"Ano Hito Amanojaku" ((あのひとあまのじゃく) "That Person Is a Pervert")	Senke	Hoguchi	3:06
5.	"Mayoeru Hitsuji" ((迷える羊; "Lost Sheep"))	Senke	Hoguchi	3:18
6.	"Glass no Shōjo" (Garasu no Shōjo (ガラスの少女; "Glass Girl"))	Senke	Hoguchi	3:35

Side B
No.	Title	Lyrics	Music	Length
1.	"Kaze" ((風; "Wind"))	Osamu Kitayama	Norihiko Hashida	3:05
2.	"Green, Green Grass of Home" (Omoide no Gurīn Gurasu (想い出のグリーン・グラス))	Curly Putman; Yamagami	Putman	3:53
3.	"Cotton Fields" (Kotton Fīruzu (コットン・フィールズ))	Huddie Ledbetter	Ledbetter	2:55
4.	"Green, Green" (Gurīn Gurīn (グリーン・グリーン))	Randy Sparks	Barry McGuire	2:08
5.	"Kaerazaru Hi no Tame ni" ((帰らざる日のために; "For the Day of No Return"))	Keisuke Yamakawa	Taku Izumi	3:20
6.	"I Believe in Music" (Ai Birību in Myūjikku (アイ・ビリーブ・イン・ミュージック))	Mac Davis; Kenji Sawada	Davis	3:53

== See also ==
- 1974 in Japanese music
