= Heart Dorobō =

Single by Candies

from the album Candies Best Hits
- Language: Japanese
- English title: Thief of Hearts
- B-side: "Ima ga Chance Desu"
- Released: September 1, 1976
- Recorded: 1976
- Genre: kayōkyoku; teen pop
- Length: 3:28
- Label: CBS Sony
- Composer: Koichi Sugiyama
- Lyricist: Haruo Hayashi
- Producers: Sumio Matsuzaki; Masatoshi Sakai

Candies singles chronology
"Natsu ga Kita!" (1976)	"Heart Dorobō" (1976)	"Aishū no Symphony" (1976)

"Heart Dorobō" (ハート泥棒, Hāto Dorobō; "Thief of Hearts") is the eleventh single by Japanese music trio Candies. Composed by Koichi Sugiyama with lyrics by Haruo Hayashi, the single was released on September 1, 1976.

The song peaked at No. 17 on Oricon's singles chart and spent 11 weeks in that chart. It reached number 16 on the Music Labo singles chart. It sold over 90,000 copies.

== Track listing ==
No.	Title	Lyrics	Music	Length
1.	"Heart Dorobō" ("Thief of Hearts" (ハート泥棒))	Haruo Hayashi	Koichi Sugiyama	3:28
2.	"Ima ga Chance Desu" ("Now Is Your Chance" (今がチャンスです))	Haruo Hayashi	Koichi Sugiyama	3:40

== Chart positions ==
Chart (1976)	Peak position
Japanese Oricon Singles Chart	17

== See also ==
- 1976 in Japanese music
