= Kaze (band) =

Japanese musical duo

- Genres: folk, soft rock, jazz fusion, country rock, pop
- Years active: 1975–1979
- Label: Crown Records
- Past members: Shōzō Ise; Kazuhisa Ōkubo
- Website: www.crownrecord.co.jp/artist/kaze/whats.html

Kaze (風) was a Japanese musical duo composed of singer-songwriters Shōzō Ise and Kazuhisa Ōkubo. They were best known for their chart-topping debut single "22-Sai no Wakare" which was released in 1975.

== Members ==
- Shōzō Ise (伊勢 正三, Ise Shōzō; born November 13, 1951)
- Kazuhisa Ōkubo (大久保 一久, Ōkubo Kazuhisa; born July 22, 1950)

== History ==
After he joined Kaguyahime, the folk-oriented pop group fronted by Kōsetsu Minami, Shōzō Ise came to prominence as a recording artist. Along with Minami and Panda Yamada, he enjoyed a successful career during the first half of the 1970s, scoring four consecutive number-one albums on the Japanese Oricon chart. However, owing to conflict with Crown Records which ignored the artist's intention, the trio decided to split at the peak of their popularity and other members started their own solo career. On the suggestion of record executive Yutaka Goto, a representative of their management office at the time, Ise formed another recording project with Kazuhisa Ōkubo. Like Ise, Ōkubo had quit the folk-rock band Neko in early 1975.

On February 5, 1975, about two months before Kaguyahime's farewell concert, Kaze's first single "22-Sai no Wakare" was released. A month after, it topped the chart and eventually became one of the best-selling singles on the Japanese chart of that year with sales of over 700,000 units, making the group's only top-ten entry there. The song itself was a remake version of Kaguyahime's fan-favorite tune penned by Ise, which originally appeared on the trio's Sankaidate no Uta album released in 1974. It became Kaze's signature song and has been one of the standard Japanese pop songs from the 1970s, later released cover versions by artists including Kozo Murashita, Akina Nakamori, Cool Five, and Kei Yasuda with Mari Yaguchi from Morning Musume. At first, however, composer hesitated to release a previously released effort as the duo's debut single. Therefore, he appealed to the record label to exclude the song from their first album, despite its success.

Their debut album, titled simply "First", was released in June 1975. The album went straight to the top of the Japanese charts, even though it did not contain a successful hit single. The album featured then-unknown Tatsuro Yamashita, Junko Yamamoto (later known as a lead vocalist of Hi-Fi Set), and Minako Yoshida on background vocals.

From 1975 to 1978, Kaze released five studio albums from Nippon Crown, all of which reached the top three on the Japanese Oricon chart. Their early two efforts were introspective folk-oriented pop, but Ise pursued West Coast-style jazz-rock sound on later materials with an arranger Ichizō Seo, particularly influenced by one of their favorite artists Steely Dan. The results were generally successful in commercial terms, though those were greeted with mixed reputation among their fans.

After fifth album Moony Night was released, the duo went on hiatus to each launch a solo career. Ise has continued his musical career intermittently to date, while Ōkubo left show business in circa 1983 and changed his job to a pharmacist. Though he had semi-retired as a professional musician, Ōkubo occasionally returned to the stage before his comeback in the early 2000s. On August 11, 1990, the pair performed together at annual concert called "Summer Picnic" held by Kōsetsu Minami at Seaside Momochi in Fukuoka City.

Kaze was reunited in 2007. Ise and Ōkubo had prepared the duo's concert tour in the following year, but the plan was canceled because Ōkubo was hospitalized due to a stroke during rehearsals in April 2008. A year later, Ise embarked on unplugged solo tour entitled "Hitori Tabi" composed of only Kaze's songs.

== Discography ==
=== Singles ===
Year	Single	Details	Peak chart positions
Year	Single	Details	JPN
1975	"Nijū-ni Sai no Wakare" (22才の別れ)	Release date: February 5, 1975; B-Side: "Yakusoku Shiyōyo" (約束しようよ)	1
1975	"Ano Uta wa Mō Utawanai no Desuka?" (あの唄はもう唄わないのですか)	Release date: December 10, 1975; B-Side: "Futari no Tame no Yoru" (2人のための夜)	24
1976	"Sasayaka na Kono Jinsei" (ささやかなこの人生)	Release date: June 25, 1976; B-Side: "Toki niwa" (時には)	16
1976	"Hōzue o Tsuku Onna" (ほおづえをつく女)	Release date: December 5, 1976; B-Side:"Tabi no Gogo" (旅の午後)	40
1977	"Yogisha wa Minami e" (夜汽車は南へ)	Release date: May 10, 1977; B-Side:"Kaze o Tazusaete" (風をたずさえて)	30
1978	"Bye Bye"	Release date: October 5, 1978; B-Side:"Good Feeling"	52

=== Albums ===
Studio albums

Title	Release date	Label	Peak chart positions
Title	Release date	Label	JPN
Kaze: First Album (風 ファーストアルバム)	June 1, 1975	Nippon Crown	1
Toki wa Nagarete (時は流れて)	January 25, 1976	Nippon Crown	1
Windless Blue	November 25, 1976	Nippon Crown	3
Umikaze (海風)	October 25, 1977	Nippon Crown	1
Moony Night	October 5, 1978	Nippon Crown	2

Selected compilation albums

- Old Calendar (1979)
- Kaze Best (1981)
- 17 Songs (1988)
- Zenkyokushu (全曲集)(1988)
- Complete Best (2000)
- Kaze Single Collection (2007)
- Kaze Best (2008)
