= Toshishita no Otokonoko (album) =

Studio album by Candies
- Released: April 21, 1975
- Recorded: 1974
- Genre: kayōkyoku; teen pop
- Length: 42:17
- Language: Japanese
- Label: CBS Sony
- Producer: Sumio Matsuzaki; Masatoshi Sakai

Candies chronology
Namida no Kisetsu (1974)	Toshishita no Otokonoko (1975)	Candies Deluxe (1975)

Singles from Toshishita no Otokonoko
- 1. "Toshishita no Otokonoko" Released: February 21, 1975

Toshishita no Otokonoko (年下の男の子; lit. A Younger Boy) is the fourth studio album by Japanese idol trio Candies, released through CBS Sony on April 21, 1975. It contains the single "Toshishita no Otokonoko" and an early version of the trio's 1976 single "Haru Ichiban".

== Track listing ==
All music is composed and arranged by Yūsuke Hoguchi, except where indicated.

Side A
No.	Title	Lyrics	Music	Arrangement	Length
1.	"Haru Ichiban" ((なみだの季節; "Spring's First Breeze"))	Yūsuke Hoguchi			3:26
2.	"Namidairo no Kōfuku" ((涙色の幸福; "Tear-colored Happiness"))	Kazuya Senke	Kunihiko Kase	Kōji Ryūzaki	2:50
3.	"Norainu" ((のらいぬ))	Senke			3:39
4.	"Wakai Hi no Hitotoki" ((若い日のひととき) "Moments of Youth")	Michio Yamagami	Daisuke Inoue		3:21
5.	"Toshishita no Otokonoko" ((年下の男の子; "A Younger Boy"))	Senke			3:33
6.	"Kanashiki Tameiki" ((悲しきためいき; "A Sad Sigh"))	Yamagami	Hiroshi Miyagawa	Ryūzaki	3:14

Side B
No.	Title	Lyrics	Music	Arrangement	Length
1.	"Kuchizuke no Ato" ((くちづけのあと; "After a Kiss"))	Machiko Ryū			3:18
2.	"Yasashī dake ja Iya" ((優しいだけじゃいや; "Just Be Gentle"))	Ryū	Kase	Ryūzaki	4:05
3.	"Ai no Shunkan" ((愛の瞬間; "Moments of Love"))	Haruo Hayashi	Miyagawa		3:00
4.	"Sotsugyō" ((卒業; "Graduation"))	Tetsuya Chiaki	Tadao Inoue	Ryūzaki	3:28
5.	"Watashi Dake no Kanashimi" ((私だけの悲しみ; "Only My Sorrow"))	Senke			3:42
6.	"Ai no Toriko" ((愛のとりこ; "Captivated by Love"))	Hayashi			4:41

== See also ==
- 1975 in Japanese music
