= Kei Ogura =

Japanese singer, songwriter and composer (born 1944)

Kei Ogura (Ogura Kei, 小椋佳, born January 18, 1944, in Ueno, Taito, Tokyo, Japan) is a Japanese singer, songwriter and composer. He was also a bank clerk of Dai-Ichi Kangyo Bank, after graduating from the University of Tokyo. His musical career was in parallel with banking activity.

His major works include Saraba seishun (さらば青春) and Oretachi-no-tabi (俺たちの旅). He is known for offering his work to other singers.

== Works ==
=== Ogura's original songs ===
- Saraba seisyun (さらば青春)
- Hikari no Hashi wo Koete (光の橋を越えて)
- Tabidachi no Jokyoku (旅立ちの序曲)
- Kansou no Uta (歓送の歌)
- Uchuu no Kakehashi (宇宙の掛け橋)

=== Works performed by other singers ===
- Oretachi-no-tabi (俺たちの旅) (singer: Masatoshi Nakamura)
- Cyclamen no kahori (シクラメンのかほり) (singer: Akira Fuse)
- Yumeshibai (夢芝居) (singer: Tomio Umezawa)
- Aisansan (愛燦燦) (singer: Hibari Misora)
- Tokigusuri (時薬) (singer: Daigoro Tachibana)
