= Namida no Kisetsu (song) =

Single by Candies

from the album Namida no Kisetsu
- Language: Japanese
- English title: Season of Tears
- B-side: Mayoeru Hitsuji (single); Ticket to Ride (EP)
- Released: September 1, 1974
- Recorded: 1974
- Genre: kayōkyoku; teen pop
- Length: 3:45
- Label: CBS Sony
- Composer: Yūsuke Hoguchi
- Lyricist: Kazuya Senke

Candies singles chronology
"Abunai Doyōbi" (1974)	"Namida no Kisetsu" (1974)	"Toshishita no Otokonoko" (1975)

"Namida no Kisetsu" (なみだの季節; "Season of Tears") is the fourth single by Japanese music trio Candies. Written by Kazuya Senke and Yūsuke Hoguchi, the single was released on September 1, 1974. This was the last single in which Yoshiko Tanaka ("Sue") assumed the role of lead singer.

The song peaked at No. 40 on Oricon's singles chart and spent 13 weeks in that chart. It sold over 59,000 copies.

== Track listing ==
All lyrics are written by Kazuya Senke, except where indicated; all music is written and arranged by Yūsuke Hoguchi, except where indicated.

7-inch single
No.	Title	Length
1.	"Namida no Kisetsu" ((なみだの季節; "Season of Tears"))	3:45
2.	"Mayoeru Hitsuji" ((迷える羊; "Lost Sheep"))	3:18

7-inch EP
No.	Title	Lyrics	Music	Arrangement	Length
1.	"Namida no Kisetsu" ((なみだの季節; "Season of Tears"))				3:45
2.	"Ticket to Ride" (涙の乗車券 (Namida no Jōshaken, "The Ticket of Tears"))	Lennon–McCartney	Lennon–McCartney	Kōji Ryūzaki	3:53
3.	"Abunai Doyōbi" (危い土曜日 ("Perilous Saturday"))	Kazumi Yasui	Kōichi Morita	Ryūzaki	3:13
4.	"Yesterday Once More" (イエスタデイ・ワンスモアー (Iesutadei Wansu Moā))	Richard Carpenter; John Bettis	Carpenter; Bettis	Ryūzaki	3:46

== Charts ==
Chart (1974)	Peak position
Japanese Oricon Singles Chart	40

== See also ==
- 1974 in Japanese music
