= Heart no Ace ga Detekonai =

Single by Candies

from the album Haru Ichiban
- Language: Japanese
- English title: Show the Ace of Hearts
- B-side: "Fuyu no Mado"
- Released: December 5, 1975
- Recorded: 1975
- Genre: kayōkyoku; teen pop
- Length: 3:06
- Label: CBS Sony
- Composer: Kōichi Morita
- Lyricist: Machiko Ryū
- Producers: Sumio Matsuzaki; Masatoshi Sakai

Candies singles chronology
"Sono Ki ni Sasenaide" (1975)	"Heart no Ace ga Detekonai" (1975)	"Haru Ichiban" (1976)

Music video
- "Heart no Ace ga Detekonai" on YouTube

"Heart no Ace Ga Detekonai" (ハートのエースが出てこない, Hāto no Ēsu ga Detekonai; "Show the Ace of Hearts") is the eighth single by Japanese music trio Candies. Written by Machiko Ryū and Kōichi Morita, the single was released on December 5, 1975.

The song peaked at No. 11 on Oricon's singles chart and spent 14 weeks in that chart. It sold over 172,000 copies.

== Track listing ==
All lyrics are written by Machiko Ryū; all music is written by Kōichi Morita; all music is arranged by Kōji Ryūzaki.

No.	Title	Length
1.	"Heart no Ace ga Detekonai" (Hāto no Ēsu ga Detekonai (ハートのエースが出てこない; "Show the Ace of Hearts"))	3:06
2.	"Fuyu no Mado" ((冬の窓; "The Window of Winter"))	3:14

== Charts ==
Chart (1975)	Peak position
Japanese Oricon Singles Chart	11

== Cover versions ==
- The Nolans covered the song in English as "Ace of Hearts" in their 1991 album Tidal Wave (Samishii Nettaigyo).
- Yukana Nogami, Mayumi Iizuka, and Yuri Shiratori covered the song as the second ending theme of the 1995 anime OVA series Hyper Doll.
- The Cover Song Dolls covered the song in their 2007 self-titled debut album.
- ManaKana covered the song in their 2009 album Futari Uta 2.

== See also ==
- 1975 in Japanese music
