= Haru Ichiban =

Single by Candies

from the album Haru Ichiban
- Language: Japanese
- English title: Spring's First Breeze
- B-side: "Futari Dake no Yoake"
- Released: March 1, 1976
- Recorded: 1975
- Genre: kayōkyoku; teen pop
- Length: 3:19
- Label: CBS Sony
- Songwriter: Yūsuke Hoguchi
- Producers: Sumio Matsuzaki; Masatoshi Sakai

Candies singles chronology
"Heart no Ace ga Detekonai" (1975)	"Haru Ichiban" (1976)	"Natsu ga Kita!" (1976)

Music video
- "Haru Ichiban" on YouTube

"Haru Ichiban" (春一番; "Spring's First Breeze") is the ninth single by Japanese music trio Candies. Written by Yūsuke Hoguchi, the single was released on March 1, 1976. The single is a rearranged version of the song originally from the 1975 album Toshishita no Otokonoko. Since its release, "Haru Ichiban" has become the trio's signature song.

The song peaked at No. 3 on Oricon's singles chart and spent 16 weeks in that chart. It sold over 360,000 copies, becoming their first top-five hit. The trio performed this song on the 27th Kōhaku Uta Gassen.

== Track listing ==
No.	Title	Lyrics	Music	Arrangement	Length
1.	"Haru Ichiban" ((春一番; "Spring's First Breeze"))	Yūsuke Hoguchi	Hoguchi	Hoguchi	3:19
2.	"Futari Dake no Yoake" ((二人だけの夜明け; "Meeting at Dawn"))	Machiko Ryū	Mitsuo Miyamoto	Kōji Ryūzaki	3:06

== Chart positions ==
Chart (1976)	Peak position
Japanese Oricon Singles Chart	3

== Cover versions ==
- Jiang Xiao-Qing covered the song in Chinese for a Suntory oolong tea commercial in 1994.
- Ulfuls covered the song as the B-side of their 1996 single "Banzai ~ Suki de Yokatte ~".
- Yuzu covered the song in their 2001 live album Kajiki ~ Futari no Big (Egg) Joe-hen.
- Ikimono-gakari covered the song as the B-side of their 2007 single "Uruwashiki Hito/Seishun no Tobira".
- Chiaki Takahashi and Asami Imai covered the song in the album The Idolm@ster Radio Uta Dojo.
- Saori Hayami, Iori Nomizu, and Mina covered the song as the ending theme of the 2009 anime series Heaven's Lost Property.
- Wakadanna covered the song in his 2012 single "Ore ga Ore ga ~ Sekaijū ga Teki ni Natte mo ~/Haru Ichiban".

== See also ==
- 1976 in Japanese music
