= Takuro Yoshida =

Japanese male singer-songwriter (born 1946)

- Born: 吉田 拓郎 (Takuro Yoshida); April 5, 1946 (age 79); Okuchi, Kagoshima, Japan
- Genres: Folk, rock, pop
- Occupation: Singer-songwriter
- Instrument(s): Guitar harmonica
- Years active: 1970–present
- Labels: Elec Records; Odyssey Records / CBS/Sony; For Life Music Entertainment; Teichiku Records; Avex Group

Takuro Yoshida (吉田 拓郎, Yoshida Takurō) is a Japanese male singer-songwriter. He was born on April 5, 1946, in Okuchi, Kagoshima, and raised in Hiroshima. He made his debut with the single "Imeji no Uta / Mark II" on June 1, 1970. His 1972 recording of "Tabi no Yado" sold over one million copies by September that year, and was awarded a gold disc. He established the record company "For Life Records" with Yosui Inoue, Shigeru Izumiya, and Hitoshi Komuro in 1975. Yoshida is a musician whose songs have been used as theme songs in television series such as Jun (純) , the theme song of Cromartie High School, as well as being covered by another popular artists like Hirakawachi 1-chome (Yoshida's "Natsu Yasumi"), KinKi Kids (Yoshida's "Zenbu Dakishimete").

== Discography ==
=== Albums ===
- Yoshida Takuro Seishun no Uta – Re-released on February 21, 1990
- Yoshida Takuro on Stage Tomodachi <live album> – Re-released on February 21, 1990
- Yoshida Takuro Ningen nante – Re-released on February 21, 1990
- Genki desu. – Re-released on February 21, 1990
- Otogi Zoushi – Re-released on February 21, 1990
- Ima ha Mada Jinsei wo Katarazu – Re-released on February 21, 1990
- Asu ni Mukatte Hashire (May 25, 1976) – Re-released on February 21, 1990
- Private (April 25, 1977) – Re-released on February 21, 1990
- Oinaru Hito (November 25, 1977) – Re-released on February 21, 1990
- Roling 30 (November 21, 1978)- Re-released on April 21, 1988
- Shangli-la (May 5, 1980) – Re-released on February 21, 1990
- Asia no Katasumi de (November 5, 1980) – Re-released on February 21, 1990
- Only You (May 1, 1981) – Re-released on February 21, 1990
- Mujinto de ... (December 5, 1981)
- Osamatachi no Haikingu in Budokan <live album> (November 21, 1982) – Re-released on March 21, 1990
- Marathon (May 21, 1983) – Re-released on February 21, 1990
- Jonetsu (November 5, 1983) – Re-released on February 21, 1990
- Forever Young (October 21, 1984)
- Ore ga Aishita Baka (June 5, 1985)
- Yoshida Takuro One Last Night in Tsumagoi <live album> (1985)
- The Yoshida Takuro <best album> (June 21, 1986) – Re-released on September 21, 1989
- Samarkand Blue (September 5, 1986)
- Much Better (April 21, 1988)
- Himawari (February 8, 1989)
- 176.5 (January 10, 1990)
- détente (June 12, 1991)
- Yoshida-cho no Uta (July 29, 1992)
- Travellin' Man Live at NHK Studio 101 <live album> (December 17, 1993)
- Long time no see (June 21, 1995)
- Life (April 19, 1996)
- Kando Ryoko Nami Takashi (August 21, 1996)
- Minna Daisuki (November 1, 1997)
- Hawaiian Rhapsody (October 30, 1998)
- Yoshida Takuro The Best Penny Lane (November 3, 1999)
- Yoshida Takuro in the Box (November 22, 2000) – A 25 CDs complete collection of works. Re-released on December 18, 2002
- Konnichiwa (2001)
- Yoshida no Uta (August 22, 2001)
- Oldies (2002)
- Golden Best Yoshida Takuro The Live Best (November 27, 2002)
- Tsukiyo no Canoe (2003)
- Yutakanaru Ichinichi <live album> (2004)
- Isshun no Natsu (2005)
- Hodokyo no Ue de (2007)
- Gozenchu ni (April 2009)
- 18ji Kaien <live album> (2009)
- Gogo no Tenki (2012)
- Yoshida Takuro Live Concert in Tsumagoi (September 2012)
