= Anata ni Muchū =

Single by Candies

from the album Anata ni Muchū: Uchiki na Candies
- Language: Japanese
- English title: Crazy for You
- B-side: "Namida Sō"
- Released: September 1, 1973
- Recorded: 1973
- Genre: Kayōkyoku; teen pop
- Length: 3:13
- Label: CBS Sony
- Composer: Kōichi Morita
- Lyricist: Michio Yamagami
- Producers: Sumio Matsuzaki; Masatoshi Sakai

Candies singles chronology
"Anata ni Muchū" (1973)	"Soyokaze no Kuchizuke" (1974)

"Anata ni Muchū" (あなたに夢中; "Crazy for You") is the debut single by Japanese music trio Candies. Written by Michio Yamagami and Kōichi Morita, the single was released on September 1, 1973. It features Yoshiko Tanaka (at that time known by her nickname "Sue") as the main vocalist from the three.

Japanese musical duo The Peanuts had a song with the same name, though the songs are not related.

The song peaked at No. 36 on Oricon's singles chart and spent 19 weeks in that chart. It sold over 81,000 copies.

== Track listing ==
All lyrics are written by Michio Yamagami; all music is written by Kōichi Morita; all music is arranged by Kōji Ryūzaki.

No.	Title	Length
1.	"Anata ni Muchū" ((あなたに夢中; "Crazy For You"))	3:13
2.	"Namida Sō" ((なみだ草; "Grass Tears"))	2:49

== Chart positions ==
Chart (1973)	Peak position
Japanese Oricon Singles Chart	36

== Cover versions ==
- Singapore boy band Black Dog Bone covered the song in Malaysian as "Telatah Si Bujang" in 1977, with Malaysian translation by Haron Abdulmajid.
- Chisa Yokoyama covered the song in her 2000 album Best Selection.
- The Possible covered the song as the B-side of their 2006 single "Hatsukoi no Kakera".
- Rolly covered the song in his 2012 album Glamorous Rolly ~ Glam Kayō o Utau.
- C@n-dols covered the song as the B-side of their 2013 single "Toshishita no Otoko no Ko".

== See also ==
- 1973 in Japanese music
