= Akira Fuse =

Japanese singer and actor (born 1947)

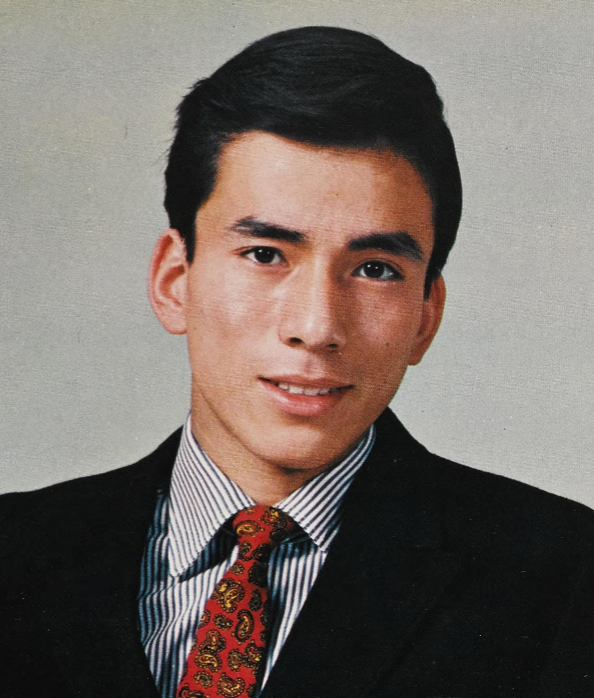
- Fuse in 1966
- Born: December 18, 1947 (age 78); Mitaka, Tokyo, Japan
- Occupations: Singer; actor
- Years active: 1965–present
- Spouse: Olivia Hussey (m. 1980; div. 1989) Yukari Morikawa (m. 2013)
- Children: 1
- Musical career
- Genre: Kayōkyoku: Western pop music; Jazz
- Label: Universal Japan
- Website: beta.universal-music.co.jp/fuse-akira/

Akira Fuse (布施 明, Fuse Akira; born December 18, 1947) is a Japanese singer and actor. He debuted in 1965 with the single "Kimi ni Namida to Hohoemi o" (君に涙とほほえみを; "Tears and Smiles to You").

== Early life ==
Fuse was born in Mitaka, Tokyo, Japan, on December 18, 1947.

Fuse had one older brother, Tsutomu Fuse, who was a Law Professor. He grew up near Yokota Air Base, and later attended Miyakofuchu High School nearby before transferring to Teshima Jitsugyo High School (now Teshima Gakuin High School).

== Career ==
His greatest hits are "Cyclamen no Kahori" (シクラメンのかほり, Shikuramen no Kahori; "The Scent of Cyclamen") and "Kimi wa Bara Yori Utsukushii" (君は薔薇より美しい; "You Are More Beautiful than a Rose"). He currently makes consistent appearances on television, performs occasional seasonal tours, hosts a late night talk show, and is involved in a number of stage plays. In 2005, he enjoyed a revival when his music was used in the popular Japanese TV-series Kamen Rider Hibiki with its ending theme "Shōnen yo" (少年よ; "Boy!") and later its second opening theme "Hajimari no Kimi e" (始まりの君へ; "To the Original You").

== Personal life ==
He married the actress Olivia Hussey on February 14, 1980, in Florida and later divorced in 1989 after he was unable to attain work in the United States and Olivia was unable to relocate her first-born son, Alexander Gunther Martin, to Japan. They met while she was filming a commercial for Kanebo Cosmetics. The wedding was attended by over 2,000 guests and lots of Japanese press. They had one child together, son Maximillian Fuse.

On April 15, 2013, his marriage to singer and actress Yukari Morikawa was announced.

== Trivia ==
Gen Hoshino created the parody character "Akira Nise" (ニセ明, Nise Akira, literally Fake Akira) as a tribute to Akira Fuse.

== Television ==
- Kamen Rider Hibiki, as senior former Oni master, who gifts Hibiki the Armed Saber (episodes 32–33).
- Everyone's Best Kouhaku 100th Anniversary of Broadcasting Special (NHK, 2025) (cast)

== Film ==
- Kore ga seishun da! (1966) (Performed film's theme song)
- Tora-san, the Matchmaker (1979)
- Be Forever Yamato (1980)
- Welcome Back, Mr. McDonald (1997)
- Minna no Ie (2001) : Hirinouchi
