= Natsu ga Kita! (song) =

Single by Candies

from the album Natsu ga Kita!
- Language: Japanese
- English title: Summer Has Come!
- B-side: "Gokigen Ikaga"
- Released: May 31, 1976
- Recorded: 1976
- Genre: J-pop; kayōkyoku
- Length: 3:14
- Label: CBS Sony
- Songwriter: Yūsuke Hoguchi
- Producers: Sumio Matsuzaki; Masatoshi Sakai

Candies singles chronology
| "Haru Ichiban" (1976) | "Natsu ga Kita!" (1976) | "Heart Dorobō" (1976) |

Music video
- "Natsu ga Kita!" on YouTube

"Natsu ga Kita!" (夏が来た!; "Summer Has Come!") is the tenth single release by Japanese music trio Candies. Written by Yūsuke Hoguchi, the single was released on May 31, 1976. It was Hoguchi's last single written for the trio.

The song peaked at No. 5 on Oricon's singles chart and spent 14 weeks in that chart. It sold over 176,000 copies.

== Track listing ==
| No. | Title | Lyrics | Music | Arrangement | Length |
|---|---|---|---|---|---|
| 1. | "Natsu ga Kita!" ((夏が来た!; "Summer Has Come!")) | Yūsuke Hoguchi | Hoguchi | Hoguchi | 3:14 |
| 2. | "Gokigen Ikaga" ((ご機嫌いかが; "How Are You")) | Yukinojō Mori | Kōji Makaino | Makaino | 3:06 |

== Chart positions ==
| Chart (1976) | Peak position |
|---|---|
| Japanese Oricon Singles Chart | 5 |

== See also ==
- 1976 in Japanese music
