= Sono Ki ni Sasenaide (song) =

Single by Candies

from the album Sono Ki ni Sasenaide
- Language: Japanese
- English title: Don't Come On to Me
- B-side: "Ichimai no Glass"
- Released: September 1, 1975
- Recorded: 1975
- Genre: kayōkyoku; teen pop
- Length: 3:36
- Label: CBS Sony
- Composer: Yūsuke Hoguchi
- Lyricist: Kazuya Senke
- Producers: Sumio Matsuzaki; Masatoshi Sakai

Candies singles chronology
| "Uchiki na Aitsu" (1975) | "Sono Ki ni Sasenaide" (1975) | "Heart no Ace ga Detekonai" (1975) |

"Sono Ki ni Sasenaide" (その気にさせないで; "Don't Come On to Me") is the seventh single by Japanese music trio Candies. Written by Kazuya Senke and Yūsuke Hoguchi, the single was released on September 1, 1975.

The song peaked at No. 17 on Oricon's singles chart and spent 14 weeks in that chart. It sold over 103,000 copies.

== Track listing ==
All lyrics are written by Kazuya Senke; all music is written and arranged by Yūsuke Hoguchi.

| No. | Title | Length |
|---|---|---|
| 1. | "Sono Ki ni Sasenaide" ((その気にさせないで; "Don't Come On to Me")) | 3:36 |
| 2. | "Ichimai no Glass" (Ichimai no Garasu (一枚のガラス; "A Piece of Glass")) | 2:49 |

== Charts ==
| Chart (1975) | Peak position |
|---|---|
| Japanese Oricon Singles Chart | 17 |

== Cover versions ==
- In 1977, Singaporean boy band Black Dog Bone covered this song in Malaysian as "Hilang Rindu Bila Bertemu", with Malaysian translation by Haron Abdulmajid.
- Tak Matsumoto covered the song on his 2003 cover album The Hit Parade, with Aiko Kitahara, Ai Takaoka, and Yuuka Saegusa on vocals.

== See also ==
- 1975 in Japanese music
