= Miki Fujimura =

Japanese singer (born 1956)

Miki Fujimura 藤村 美樹
- Also known as: Miki (ミキ)
- Born: January 15, 1956 (age 70); Setagaya, Tokyo, Japan
- Origin: Fukushima, Fukushima, Japan
- Genres: J-pop, Kayōkyoku
- Occupation: Singer
- Years active: 1973–1978; 1983
- Label: Polydor Records (1983)

Miki Fujimura (藤村 美樹, Fujimura Miki; born 15 January 1956 in Setagaya, Tokyo, Japan, and raised in Fukushima) is a Japanese singer, best known as Miki (ミキ), a member of the pop trio Candies.

== Biography ==
Fujimura was born in Setagaya, Tokyo, but her family relocated to Fukushima soon after her birth. In 1970, she joined Ito and Tanaka in a group called "School Mates", which later became Candies, signed with Watanabe Productions.

Her 1983 single "Yume-Koi-Bito" reached number 13 on the Oricon Singles Chart.

== Discography ==
=== Albums ===
| # | Title | Release date |
|---|---|---|
| 1 | Yume-Koi-Bito. (夢・恋・人。) | 1983-02-01 |

=== Singles ===
| # | Title | Release date |
|---|---|---|
| 1 | Yume Koibito (夢恋人) | 1983-03-25 |

== Appearances ==
=== Television ===
- 1983, Tetsuko no Heya (Tetsuko's Room) – Talk Show

== See also ==
- Yoshiko Tanaka, (a member of Candies)
- Ran Ito, (a member of Candies)
