= Ran Itō =

Japanese actress and singer

- Born: 13 January 1955 (age 71); Kichijōji, Musashino, Tokyo, Japan
- Occupation: Actress
- Years active: 1972–present
- Spouse: Yutaka Mizutani (m. 1989)
- Children: Shuri

Ran Itō (伊藤 蘭, Itō Ran; born 13 January 1955) is a Japanese actress and previous member of the 1970s idol group Candies. As the leading member of Candies, Itō was in charge of the solo of most of the trio's hit songs.

Itō was born in Kichijōji, Musashino, Tokyo, Japan. She is married to actor Yutaka Mizutani. Itō won the award for best supporting actress at the 2nd Yokohama Film Festival for Disciples of Hippocrates.

In 2019, Itō released her first solo album, My Bouquet. On 15 February 2020, she kicked off her first concert tour, My Bouquet & My Dear Candies!, which featured several Candies songs in the set list.

== Filmography ==
=== Films ===
- Disciples of Hippocrates (1980)
- Foster Daddy, Tora! (1980)
- A Boy Called H (2013)
- When the Curtain of Prayer Descend (2018)

=== TV ===
- The Sun Never Sets (2000)
- Dare Yorimo Mama o Ai su (2006)
- Full Swing (2008)
- Gakkō ja Oshierarenai! (2008)
- Miss Sherlock (2018)
- Modern Love Tokyo (2022)

== Discography ==
=== Albums ===
| Year | Information | Oricon weekly peak position | Sales |
|---|---|---|---|
| 2019 | My Bouquet: Released: 29 May 2019; Label: Sony Music Direct; Formats: CD, digital, LP | 8 | |
| 2021 | Beside You: Released: 1 September 2021; Label: Sony Music Direct; Formats: CD, digital | 19 | |
| 2023 | Level 9.9: Released: 19 July 2023; Label: Sony Music Direct; Formats: CD, digital | 27 | JPN: 2,325 |
| 2026 | Bright On: Released: 1 April 2026; Label: Sony Music Direct; Formats: CD, digital | 31 | JPN: 1,644 |

=== Video albums ===
List of media, with selected chart positions
| Title | Album details | Peak positions | |
| Title | Album details | JPN DVD | JPN Blu-ray |
|---|---|---|---|
| Ran Itō First Solo Concert 2019 | Released: 22 July 2020; Label: Sony Music Direct; Formats: DVD, Blu-ray | 48 | 22 |
| Ran Itō Concert Tour 2020: My Bouquet & My Dear Candies! | Released: 17 March 2021; Label: Sony Music Direct; Formats: DVD, Blu-ray | 30 | 30 |
| Ran Itō Concert Tour 2021: Beside You & Fun Fun Candies! | Released: 27 April 2022; Label: Sony Music Direct; Formats: DVD, Blu-ray | | |
| 50th Anniversary Tour: Started from Candies | Released: 29 May 2024; Label: Sony Music Direct; Formats: DVD, Blu-ray | | |

=== Singles ===
List of singles, with selected details
| Title | Date | Album |
|---|---|---|
| "Koisuru Revolver" | 9 December 2020 | Beside You |
| "Kaze ni Notte: Over the Moon" | 21 August 2024 | Non-album single |

== See also ==
- Miki Fujimura (a member of Candies)
- Yoshiko Tanaka (a member of Candies)
