= Toshishita no Otokonoko =

1973 single by Candies

Single by Candies

from the album Toshishita no Otokonoko
- Language: Japanese
- English title: A Younger Boy
- B-side: "Watashi Dake no Kanashimi"
- Released: February 21, 1975
- Recorded: 1974
- Genre: kayōkyoku; teen pop
- Length: 3:34
- Label: CBS Sony
- Songwriter: Yūsuke Hoguchi
- Lyricist: Kazuya Senke
- Producers: Sumio Matsuzaki; Masatoshi Sakai

Candies singles chronology
"Namida no Kisetsu" (1974)	"Toshishita no Otokonoko" (1975)	"Uchiki na Aitsu" (1975)

"Toshishita no Otokonoko" (年下の男の子; "A Younger Boy") is the fifth single by Japanese music trio Candies. Written by Kazuya Senke and Yūsuke Hoguchi, the single was released on September 1, 1973. It was the first single to feature Ran Itō as the main vocalist.

The song peaked at No. 9 on Oricon's singles chart and spent 19 weeks in that chart. It sold over 260,000 copies, making it the trio's first top-10 hit. The group made their Kōhaku Uta Gassen debut with this song, at the 26th event.

== Track listing ==
All lyrics are written by Kazuya Senke; all music is written and arranged by Yūsuke Hoguchi.

No.	Title	Length
1.	"Toshishita no Otokonoko" ((年下の男の子; "A Younger Boy"))	3:34
2.	"Watashi Dake no Kanashimi" ((私だけの悲しみ; "Only My Sorrow"))	3:42

== Charts ==
Chart (1975)	Peak position
Japanese Oricon Singles Chart	9

== Star Flower version ==
"Toshishita no Otokonoko"

Single by Star Flower
- Language: Japanese
- English title: A Younger Boy
- B-side: "Fight!!!"
- Released: August 1, 2012
- Genre: J-pop
- Length: 3:33
- Label: Victor
- Songwriter: Yūsuke Hoguchi
- Lyricist: Kazuya Senke

Star Flower singles chronology
"Toshishita no Otokonoko" (2012)	"White Love" (2012)

The duo Star Flower (すたーふらわー, Sutā Furawā), made up of child actresses Kanon Tani and Seiran Kobayashi, covered the song in August 2012. It peaked at No. 62 on Oricon's singled chart.

=== Track listing ===
No.	Title	Lyrics	Music	Arrangement	Length
1.	"Toshishita no Otokonoko" ((年下の男の子; "A Younger Boy"))	Kazuya Senke	Yūsuke Hoguchi		3:33
2.	"Fight!!!" (Faito'!!! (ファイトっ!!!))	MEG.ME	MEG.ME	MEG.ME	3:44
3.	"Toshishita no Otokonoko" (Karaoke)				3:33
4.	"Fight!!!" (Karaoke)				3:40

=== Charts ===
Chart (2012)	Peak position
Japanese Oricon Singles Chart	62

== Super Girls version ==
"Toshishita no Otokonoko"

Single by Super Girls
- Language: Japanese
- English title: Younger Boy
- B-side: "Survival"
- Released: December 4, 2013
- Genre: J-pop
- Label: Idol Street
- Songwriter: Yūsuke Hoguchi
- Lyricist: Kazuya Senke

Super Girls singles chronology
"Tokonatsu High Touch" (2013)	"Toshishita no Otokonoko" (2013)	"Sorairo no Kiseki" (2014)

Japanese idol group Super Girls (credited as "Candy Macchiato from Super Girls" (キャンディーマキアート from SUPER☆GiRLS)) released their version of "Toshishita no Otokonoko" on December 4, 2013. The single peaked at No. 11 on Oricon's singles chart.

=== Track listing ===
No.	Title	Lyrics	Music	Arrangement	Length
1.	"Toshishita no Otokonoko" ((年下の男の子; "A Younger Boy"))	Kazuya Senke	Yūsuke Hoguchi
2.	"Survival"	Kyasu Morizuki	Katsumi Ohnishi	The Rog

Type B bonus tracks
No.	Title	Length
3.	"Toshishita no Otokonoko" (Instrumental)
4.	"Survival" (Instrumental)

Type C bonus track
No.	Title	Length
3.	"Team Candy Macchiato Between Ourselves!!!" (Chīmu Kyandī Makiāto Koko dake no Hanashi!!! (Teamキャンディーマキアート ここだけの話!!!))

DVD
No.	Title	Length
1.	"Toshishita no Otokonoko" (Music Video)
2.	"Toshishita no Otokonoko" (Music Video Making)

=== Charts ===
Chart (2013)	Peak position
Japanese Oricon Singles Chart	11

== Other cover versions ==
- The Nolans covered the song in English as "Toy Boy" on their 1991 cover album Tidal Wave (Samishii Nettaigyo).
- J-pop group Sexy Mates covered the song in 1994 as the sixth ending theme for the anime Tsuyoshi Shikkari Shinasai.
- Speena covered the song as a B-side of her 2005 single "Material Girl".
- Janet Kay covered the song in English on her 2012 cover album Idol Kay.
- C@n-dols covered the song in 2013.
- J-pop group Goose House covered this song in 2014 on their YouTube channel.
- Mone Kamishiraishi covered the song on her 2021 cover album Ano Uta.
- AKB48 covered this song on their 10th album Nantetatte AKB48.

== See also ==
- 1975 in Japanese music
