= Yoshiko Tanaka =

Japanese actress (1956–2011)

- 田中 好子
- Tanaka in 1984
- Born: April 8, 1956; Tokyo, Japan
- Died: April 21, 2011 (aged 55); Tokyo, Japan
- Occupations: Actress; singer
- Years active: 1972–2011
- Spouse: Kazuo Odate (m. 1991)
- Relatives: Masako Natsume (sister-in-law)

Yoshiko Tanaka (田中 好子, Tanaka Yoshiko; April 8, 1956 – April 21, 2011) was a Japanese actress and singer.

== Early life ==
Yoshiko Tanaka was born in the Umeda area of Tokyo on April 8, 1956.

== Career ==
Tanaka first came to prominence as a member of the pop group Candies, during which time she was known by the nickname "Sue" (スーちゃん, Sū-chan). She became an actress after the group disbanded in 1978. She had a role in Godzilla vs. Biollante and starred in Black Rain, the latter earning her the Hochi Film Award for Best Actress. She also appeared in television series such as Oshin and Tokugawa Ieyasu.

== Personal life ==
Tanaka was married to businessman Kazuo Odate from 1991 until her death in 2011. She was the sister-in-law of actress Masako Natsume.

== Illness and death ==
In 1992, Tanaka was diagnosed with breast cancer, which was successfully treated. The cancer returned in October 2010 and she died in the Mita area of Tokyo on April 21, 2011, just under two weeks after her 55th birthday.

== Filmography ==
=== Film ===
- Godzilla vs. Biollante (1989) – Asuka Okouchi
- Black Rain (1989) – Yasuko

=== Television ===
- Totsugeki! Hyūman!! (1972) – Hoshiyama Rumiko
- Oshin (1983) – Hatsuko age 20-40
- Tokugawa Ieyasu (1983) – Ayame
- Byakkotai (1986) – Yamamoto Yaeko
- Platonic Sex (2001) – Kana's Mother

== Discography ==
=== Albums ===
1. Yoshiko (好子, 1984)

=== Singles ===
1. "Cabochard" (カボシャール)
2. "Tsumi TO ME" (罪 TO ME)
3. "Gozen 5 Toki No DREAM" (午前5時のドリーム)
4. "Feel My Love Inside"
