= Koichi Morita =

Japanese composer and singer

Kōichi Morita
- Born: February 25, 1940 (age 86)
- Origin: Rumoi, Hokkaidō, Japan
- Genres: Kayōkyoku, folk rock, pop
- Occupations: Composer, singer
- Instruments: Vocals, keyboards
- Years active: 1969–present

Kōichi Morita (森田 公一, Morita Kōichi) (born February 25, 1940), is a Japanese composer and singer who launched his recording career in the late 1960s and had gained huge commercial success during the 1970s.

He often teamed up with lyricist Yū Aku and orchestrator Junichi Makaino, and became the top-10 hit on the Japanese Oricon chart. Seven of his compositions has been topped on the Japanese hit parade, including "Hitori ja Nai no" by Mari Amachi, "Chiisana Koi no Monogatari" by Agnes Chan, and "Hajimete no Dekigoto" by Junko Sakurada. His most successful song is "Seishun Jidai" released in 1976, his sole hit as a performer, which has sold more than a million copies.

His 2-disc 40th anniversary compilation album, "Golden☆Best Kōichi Morita" (GOLDEN☆BEST 森田公一) will be released on January 20, 2010, featuring the songs he has written and composed for other artists, such as Eigo Kawashima, Akiko Wada, Candies and Mari Amachi, as well as his own single, Seishun Jidai.

== Notable compositions ==
- Mari Amachi
  - "Hitori ja Nai no", "Niji wo Watatte" (1972)
  - "Wakaba no Sasayaki", "Koisuru Natsu no Hi", "Sora Ippai no Shiawase" (1973)
  - "Koibitotachi no Minato", "Koi to Umi to T-Shirt to", "Omoide no Serenade" (1974)
- Björn and Benny
  - "Love Has Its Ways" (1972)
- Candies
  - "Anata ni Muchū" (1973)
  - "Soyokaze no Kuchizuke", "Abunai Doyōbi" (1974)
  - "Heart no Ace ga Detekonai" (1975)
- Agnes Chan
  - "Hinageshi no Hana" (1972)
  - "Chiisana Koi no Monogatari" (1973)
- Naomi Chiaki
  - "Nee Anta"
- Yuki Hide
  - "Seishun no Tabidachi" (1978)
- Mako Ishino
  - "Haru La! La! La!" (1980)
- Eigo Kawashima
  - "Jidai Okure" (1986)
- Naoko Ken
  - "Uwasa no Otoko" (1973)
- Akira Kobayashi
  - "Yume'n Naka" (1978)
- The Lilies
  - "Suki yo Captain" (1975)
- Patty
  - "Squall Love" (1981)
- Yoshito Machida
  - "10oku kōnen no Ai" (1980)
- Ato Mizumori and the Top Gallants
  - "Minami no Shima no Hamehameha Daiō"
- Koichi Morita
  - "Seiun no Uta"
  - "Geshukuya" (1976, with the Top Gallants)
  - "Seishun Jidai" (1976, with the Top Gallants)
  - "Omoide no Piano", "Sugite Shimaeba" (1977, with the Top Gallants)
- Ryoko Moriyama
  - "Aisuru Hito ni Utawasenaide" (1968)
- Nana Okada
  - "Seishun no Sakamichi" (1976)
- Kumiko Osugi
  - "Don Chuck to Issho ni" (1975)
- Akiko Ozawa
  - "Zenryaku Konotabi Hikkoshimashita" (1995)
- Ikue Sakakibara
  - "Bus Tsūgaku","Wagamama Kinyoubi" (1977)
- Junko Sakurada
  - "Kiiroi Ribbon", "Hajimete no Dekigoto" (1974)
  - "17 no Natsu" (1975)
  - "Natsu ni Goyoujin" (1976)
  - "Kimagure Venus" (1977)
- Akiko Wada
  - "Ano Kane wo Narasunowa Anata" (1972)
  - "Mō Ichido Futari de Utaitai" (1986)
