= Candies (group) =

Japanese idol trio (1973–1978)

Candies キャンディーズ
- Miki, Ran, and Sue

Background information
- Origin: Japan
- Genres: Kayōkyoku; teen pop
- Years active: 1973–1978
- Label: CBS Sony
- Past members: Ran Itō; Yoshiko "Sue" Tanaka; Miki Fujimura
- Website: Sony Music/candies

Candies (キャンディーズ, Kyandīzu) was a Japanese idol trio formed in 1973, their first single being "Anata ni Muchū". The trio was composed of three girls: Ran (ラン) (Ran Itō (伊藤蘭, Itō Ran)), Sue (スー, Sū) (Yoshiko Tanaka (田中好子, Tanaka Yoshiko)), and Miki (ミキ) (Miki Fujimura (藤村美樹, Fujimura Miki). Songwriters included Michio Yamagami, Kōichi Morita, Yūsuke Hoguchi, and Kazuya Senka. The group was popular among young Japanese people.

== History ==
=== Biography ===
The Candies had eight top 10 songs: "Toshishita no Otokonoko", "Haru Ichiban", "Natsu ga Kita!", "Yasashii Akuma", "Shochū Omimai Mōshiagemasu", "Un, Deux, Trois", "Wana", and "Hohoemi Gaeshi". They were a representative idol group of Japan in the 1970s along with Pink Lady.

In 1977, at the height of their popularity, they dropped out of the music business with the famous phrase of "Futsū no on'nanoko ni modoritai" (普通の女の子に戻りたい; "We want to return to being ordinary girls.") Their farewell concert was held at the Korakuen Stadium on April 4, 1978.

A few years after leaving the industry, Ran and Sue came back as actresses. Miki returned to singing, but quit shortly after getting married.

In 2008, there were plans for a Candies reunion tour to celebrate 35 years since their debut and 30 years since their epic farewell concert. The tour never came about, mainly due to Sue's acting schedule and Miki's desire to remain out of the public eye for the sake of her family. However, the trio contributed pictures and essays to release a commemoration "Time Capsule" best-of album instead and did not meet during production.

Sue died from breast cancer in April 2011. Ran and Miki delivered the eulogy at her funeral. Sue also left behind a recording of her final thoughts. In this recording (as well as in Miki's eulogy), it was revealed that all three members never again had the chance to reunite, yet have always desired to perform again.

In 2011, the Japanese music program Music Station listed them in their Top 50 Idols of All-time based on their sales figures. They were placed no. 32, with sales exceeding 5,000,000.

In 2019, Ran started performing again as a solo singer.

=== Legacy ===
Two years after their breakup, the Candies were depicted as anthropomorphic cats in the 1980 anime Sue Cat, titled after member Sue.

In 2025, the song "銀河系まで飛んで行け！" ("Fly to the Galaxy!") received renewed popularity when excerpts of this song were featured as the theme music in the Japanese animated short series "MILKY☆SUBWAY THE GALACTIC LIMITED EXPRESS".

== Discography ==
- Anata ni Muchū: Uchiki na Candies (1973)
- Abunai Doyōbi: Candies no Sekai (1974)
- Namida no Kisetsu (1974)
- Toshishita no Otokonoko (1975)
- Sono Ki ni Sasenaide (1975)
- Haru Ichiban (1976)
- Natsu ga Kita! (1976)
- Candies 1½: Yasashii Akuma (1977)
- Candy Label (1977)
- Sōshunfu (1978)

== Filmography ==
=== TV ===
The Candies appeared in Migoro! Tabegoro! Waraigoro!!

==== Kōhaku Uta Gassen appearances ====
Year / Broadcast	Appearance	Song	Appearance order	Opponent
1975 (Shōwa 50) / 26th	Debut	"Toshishita no Otokonoko"	4/24	Zoo True Bee
1976 (Shōwa 51) / 27th	2	"Haru Ichiban"	3/24	Four Leaves
1977 (Shōwa 52) / 28th	3	"Yasashii Akuma"	7/24	Hideki Saijo

== See also ==
- Japanese idol
- Pink Lady
- Momoe Yamaguchi
- Junko Sakurada
