= Masatoshi Sakai =

Japanese record producer (1935–2021)

- 酒井政利
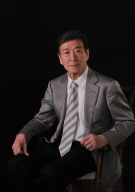
- Born: 17 November 1935; Yasuda, Wakayama, Japan
- Died: 16 July 2021 (aged 85); Tokyo, Japan
- Education: Rikkyo University
- Occupation: Record producer
- Employers: Nippon Columbia; CBS/Sony
- Known for: Producing hit songs for Japanese popular music artists
- Awards: Person of Cultural Merit (2020); Commissioner for Cultural Affairs Award (2005); Special Achievement Award, Japan Record Awards (2021)

Masatoshi Sakai (Japanese: 酒井政利; 1935–2021) was a Japanese record producer who produced a large number of hit songs. He received the Person of Cultural Merit in November 2020. He achieved sales of records to the value of more than ¥870 billion. He produced songs such as Ihojin by Saki Kubota, and Ii Hi Tabidachi and Playback Part 2 by Momoe Yamaguchi.

He produced the song Ai to Shi o Mitsumete (Japanese: 愛と死をみつめて) by Kazuko Aoyama, which won the Japan Record Award at the 6th Japan Record Awards in 1964. He produced the song Miserarete by Judy Ongg, which won the Japan Record Award at the 21st Japan Record Awards in 1979. He won a special achievement award at the 63rd Japan Record Awards in 2021.

Sakai received the Commissioner for Cultural Affairs Award from the Agency for Cultural Affairs in 2005.

He worked for Nippon Columbia from 1961, and for CBS/Sony from 1968.

Sakai produced songs for the Candies, including Hohoemi Gaeshi. The Candies' Toshishita no Otokonoko was another one of Sakai's hits. He produced the song 17-sai by Saori Minami, and the album Pacific (1978). He produced songs for Hiromi Go, including Otokonoko Onnanoko (English title: "Hey Go, Go"). and Yoroshiku Aishuu. He was involved, with Shūji Terayama, in the creation of the song Toki ni wa Haha no Nai Ko no Yō ni by Carmen Maki. He produced the song Yo Ga Akete by Sumiko Sakamoto.

He also worked with Mari Amachi, Yukiji Asaoka, Eikichi Yazawa, Four Leaves, Seiko Matsuda and Rie Miyazawa. He produced songs for more than 350 artists.

In 2019, it was announced that there would be a film about Masatoshi Sakai and Yū Aku. Masatoshi Sakai is a character in the NHK television drama Aidoru tanjō kagayake Shōwa kayō (Japanese: アイドル誕生 輝け昭和歌謡) (2023), played by the actor Masaki Miura.

== Life ==
Masatoshi Sakai was born on 17 November 1935in Yasuda, which was located in a place that subsequently became part of Arida, Wakayama. He died from heart failure in Tokyo on 16 July 2021.

He was educated at Wakayama Prefectural Minoshima High School and graduated from Rikkyo University.
