= Kuko / Yukigesho =

Studio album by Teresa Teng
- Released: October 21, 1974
- Genre: Pop
- Length: 45:17
- Language: Japanese
- Label: Polydor
- Producer: Kimisho Inomata; Kyohei Tsutsumi; Koichi Morita; Masaaki Hirao; Hideyuki Fujiwara; Shunichi Tokura; Akiko Kosaka

Teresa Teng chronology
Kuko / Yukigesho (1974)	Yoru no Jokyaku / Onna no Ikigai (1975)

Singles from Kuko / Yukigesho
- 1. "Konyakashira Ashitakashira" Released: March 1, 1974; 2. "Airport" Released: July 1, 1974; 3. "Yukigesho" Released: October 21, 1974

Kuko / Yukigesho (Japanese: 空港 / 雪化粧; English: Airport / Snow Covered) is the first Japanese studio album recorded by Taiwanese singer Teresa Teng, released via Polydor Records on October 21, 1974. The album was supported with the release of three singles: "Konya Kashira Ashita Kashira", "Airport", and "Yukigesho".

The album Kuko / Yukigesho was commercially successful in Japan, with the single "Airport" selling over 750,000 copies throughout Asia. A Mandarin version of the album was released as Love Songs of the Island: Goodbye My Love on September 10, 1975.

== Background ==
After recording various albums in Taiwan and Hong Kong in the 1960s and 1970s as a teenager, Teng, along with her record company, began to express interest towards expanding into the lucrative Japanese market. A Japanese executive was convinced that Teng would succeed in Japan as a "Taiwanese Hibari Misora"—an enka singer whom Teng had idolized since childhood. Teresa's father initially rejected the idea since she had already found adequate success in the Taiwanese and Hong Kong markets, but his opinion eventually changed and Teng subsequently began recording songs for her Japanese debut record.

== Singles ==
Teng made her Japanese debut on March 1, 1974, with the release of her first single "Konya Kashira Ashita Kashira" (No Matter Tonight or Tomorrow). The release contained a track titled "Ame ni Nureta Hana" as its B-side. The single underperformed on the charts in Japan upon its release, however, selling only around 30,000 copies in the country. Some pointed out that the single's underwhelming performance was attributed to Teng's Japanese pronunciation; in response, she made efforts to improve her pronunciation as well as her singing style.

Teng would soon find greater success with the release of the album's second single "Airport" on July 1, 1974, coupled with the B-side track "Hagureta Koboto". The single reached number 29 on the weekly Oricon Singles Chart and saw significantly higher levels of sales compared to her previous effort, where it sold over 750,000 copies throughout Asia. Its success led Teng to win various awards in Japan, including at the annual Japan Record Awards.

The third single "Yukigesho", was released in conjunction with the album on October 21 and contained the B-side track "Tokukara Ai wo Komete". It performed modestly on the charts and reached number 41 on the Oricon Singles Chart. Additionally, the song "Goodbye My Love" (a cover of Ann Lewis's song of the same name) was re-recorded in Mandarin and released as a single for the album Love Songs of Island: Goodbye My Love on September 10, 1975.

== Accolades ==
Awards and nominations
Year	Organization	Award	Recipient	Result	Ref.
1974	Ginza Music Festival	Best Performance Award	Teresa Teng	Won	
1974	Japan Record Awards	New Artist Award	"Airport"	Won	
1974	Japan Record Awards	Best New Artist Award	"Airport"	Nominated	
1974	Shinjuku Music Festival	Silver Award	"Airport"	Won	

== Track listing ==
Kuko / Yukigesho track listing
No.	Title	Lyrics	Music	Arrangement	Length
1.	"Airport" (空港; Kūkō)	Michio Yamagami	Kimisho Inomata	Kenichiro Morioka	4:20
2.	"Tokukara Ai wo Komete" (遠くから愛をこめて)	Yamagami	Inomata	Morioka	4:13
3.	"Konya Kashira Ashita Kashira" (今夜かしら明日かしら)	Yamagami	Kyohei Tsutsumi	Hiroshi Takada	4:37
4.	"Hagureta Koboto" (はぐれた小鳩)	Yamagami	Inomata	Morioka	4:14
5.	"Ame ni Nureta Hana" (雨にぬれた花)	Yamagami	Koichi Morita	Takada	5:08
6.	"Yukigesho" (雪化粧)	Yamagami	Inomata	Morioka	5:05
7.	"Minatomachi Blues" (港町ブルース)	Takeshi Fukatsu, Rei Nakanishi	Inomata	Morioka	4:16
8.	"Goodbye My Love" (グッドバイ・マイ・ラブ)	Rei Nakanishi	Masaaki Hirao	Morioka	3:50
9.	"Futari de Osake wo" (二人でお酒を)	Yamagami	Hirao	Morioka	5:08
10.	"Tokyo Blues" (東京ブルース)	Kaoru Mizuki	Hideyuki Fujiwara	Morioka	4:36
11.	"Tohiko" (逃避行)	Kazuya Senke	Shunichi Tokura	Morioka	4:36
12.	"Anata" (あなた)	Akiko Kosaka	Kosaka	Morioka	4:36
Total length:					45:27
