= 1977 in Japanese music =

In 1977 (Shōwa 52), Japanese music was released on records and performed in concerts, and there were charts, awards, contests and festivals.

During that year, Japan continued to have the second largest music market in the world.

== Awards, contests and festivals ==
The 13th Yamaha Popular Song Contest was held on 8 May 1977. The 6th Tokyo Music Festival was held on 19 June 1977. The 14th Yamaha Popular Song Contest was held on 2 October 1977. The 20th Osaka International Festival (Japanese: 大阪国際フェスティバル) was held from 6 November to 10 November 1977. The final of the 8th World Popular Song Festival was held on 13 November 1977. The final of the 6th FNS Music Festival was held on 20 December 1977. The 19th Japan Record Awards were held on 31 December 1977. The 28th NHK Kōhaku Uta Gassen was held on 31 December 1977.

The 26th Otaka prize was won by Teruyuki Noda.

== Concerts ==
Kaze had a concert at the Nippon Budokan on 6 December 1977.

== Number one singles ==
Oricon

The following reached number 1 on the weekly Oricon Singles Chart:

| Issue date | Song | Artist(s) |
|---|---|---|
| 3 January | "Kita no Yadokara" | Harumi Miyako |
| 10 January | "Kita no Yadokara" | Harumi Miyako |
| 17 January | "Seishun Jidai" | Koichi Morita & Top Gallants |
| 24 January | "Seishun Jidai" | Koichi Morita & Top Gallants |
| 31 January | "Seishun Jidai" | Koichi Morita & Top Gallants |
| 7 February | "Seishun Jidai" | Koichi Morita & Top Gallants |
| 14 February | "S.O.S." | Pink Lady |
| 21 February | "Shitsuren Restaurant" | Kentaro Shimizu |
| 28 February | "Shitsuren Restaurant" | Kentaro Shimizu |
| 7 March | "Shitsuren Restaurant" | Kentaro Shimizu |
| 14 March | "Shitsuren Restaurant" | Kentaro Shimizu |
| 21 March | "Shitsuren Restaurant" | Kentaro Shimizu |
| 28 March | "Carmen '77" | Pink Lady |
| 4 April | "Carmen '77" | Pink Lady |
| 11 April | "Carmen '77" | Pink Lady |
| 18 April | "Carmen '77" | Pink Lady |
| 25 April | "Carmen '77" | Pink Lady |
| 2 May | "Kaeranai / Koibitoyo" | Kentaro Shimizu |
| 9 May | "Kaeranai / Koibitoyo" | Kentaro Shimizu |
| 16 May | "Yumesaki Annainin" | Momoe Yamaguchi |
| 23 May | "Amayadori" | Masashi Sada |
| 30 May | "Amayadori" | Masashi Sada |
| 6 June | "Amayadori" | Masashi Sada |
| 13 June | "Amayadori" | Masashi Sada |
| 20 June | "Katte ni Shiyagare" | Kenji Sawada |
| 27 June | "Nagisa no Sindbad" | Pink Lady |
| 4 July | "Nagisa no Sindbad" | Pink Lady |
| 11 July | "Nagisa no Sindbad" | Pink Lady |
| 18 July | "Katte ni Shiyagare" | Kenji Sawada |
| 25 July | "Katte ni Shiyagare" | Kenji Sawada |
| 1 August | "Katte ni Shiyagare" | Kenji Sawada |
| 8 August | "Katte ni Shiyagare" | Kenji Sawada |
| 15 August | "Nagisa no Sindbad" | Pink Lady |
| 22 August | "Nagisa no Sindbad" | Pink Lady |
| 29 August | "Nagisa no Sindbad" | Pink Lady |
| 5 September | "Nagisa no Sindbad" | Pink Lady |
| 12 September | "Nagisa no Sindbad" | Pink Lady |
| 19 September | "Wanted (Shimei Tehai)" | Pink Lady |
| 26 September | "Wanted (Shimei Tehai)" | Pink Lady |
| 3 October | "Wanted (Shimei Tehai)" | Pink Lady |
| 10 October | "Wanted (Shimei Tehai)" | Pink Lady |
| 17 October | "Wanted (Shimei Tehai)" | Pink Lady |
| 24 October | "Wanted (Shimei Tehai)" | Pink Lady |
| 31 October | "Wanted (Shimei Tehai)" | Pink Lady |
| 7 November | "Wanted (Shimei Tehai)" | Pink Lady |
| 14 November | "Wanted (Shimei Tehai)" | Pink Lady |
| 21 November | "Wanted (Shimei Tehai)" | Pink Lady |
| 28 November | "Wanted (Shimei Tehai)" | Pink Lady |
| 5 December | "Wanted (Shimei Tehai)" | Pink Lady |
| 12 December | "Wakareuta" | Miyuki Nakajima |
| 19 December | "UFO" | Pink Lady |
| 26 December | "UFO" | Pink Lady |

== Number one albums and LPs ==
Cash Box

The following reached number 1 on the Cash Box chart:

- 1 January, 8 January, 5 February, 12 February, 19 February and 26 February: Toozakaru Fukeyi - Kei Ogura
- 5 March and 12 March: New Best - Bay City Rollers
- 19 March, 26 March, 2 April, 16 April, 23 April, 30 April, 7 May, 14 May, 4 June, 18 June and 25 June: Love Collection - Hi-Fi Set
- 11 June: Shokubutsushi - Iruka
- 2 July: Private - Takuro Yoshida
- 9 July and 16 July: The Beatles Super Live At The Hollywood Bowl - The Beatles
- 23 July: Challenge Concert - Pink Lady
- 30 July: Hotel California - Eagles
- 6 August: Kentaro First (Japanese: 健太郎ファースト) - Kentaro Shimizu
- 13 August: Ima Kokoro No Mamani - Kōsetsu Minami
- 20 August: Koi No Game - Bay City Rollers
- 27 August, 3 September, 24 September, 1 October and 8 October: Kazamidori - Masashi Sada
- 15 October and 22 October: Diary - Hi-Fi Set
- 29 October, 12 November, 19 November and 31 December: Danryu Sayuri Ishikawa Best 14 (Japanese: 暖流 石川さゆりベスト14) - Sayuri Ishikawa
- 26 November, 3 December, 10 December, 17 December and 24 December: Umikaze - Kaze

Oricon

The following reached number 1 on the Oricon LP chart:

- 10 January and 17 January: Toozakaru Fukeyi - Kei Ogura
- 24 January: A Day at the Races - Queen
- 31 January, 7 February and 14 February: New Best - Bay City Rollers
- 21 February, 28 February, 7 March, 14 March, 21 March, 28 March, 4 April, 11 April, 18 April, 25 April and 2 May: Love Collection - Hi-Fi Set
- 9 May: Akazukinchan Himitsudayo (Japanese: 赤頭巾ちゃん秘密だよ) - Miura Tomokazu To Nakama Tachi (Japanese: 三浦友和と仲間たち)
- 16 May and 23 May: Private - Takuro Yoshida
- 30 May: Shokubutsushi - Iruka
- 6 June, 13 June and 27 June: The Beatles Super Live At The Hollywood Bowl - The Beatles
- 20 June: Challenge Concert - Pink Lady
- 4 July and 11 July: Kentaro First (Japanese: 健太郎ファースト) - Kentaro Shimizu
- 18 July: Ima Kokoro No Mamani - Kōsetsu Minami
- 25 July and 1 August: Koi No Game - Bay City Rollers
- 8 August, 15 August and 22 August: Kazamidori - Masashi Sada
- 29 August, 5 September, 12 September, 19 September, 26 September and 3 October: Soundtrack of "Space Battleship Yamato"
- 10 October, 17 October, 24 October, 31 October, 28 November and 12 December: Danryu (暖流) - Sayuri Ishikawa
- 7 November, 14 November and 21 November: Umikaze - Kaze
- 5 December: Omoikiri Kiza Na Jinsei - Kenji Sawada
- 19 December and 26 December: Pink Lady Best Hit Album - Pink Lady

== Annual charts ==
Pink Lady's Nagisa no Sindbad was number 1 in the Oricon annual singles chart.

== Film and television ==
The music of The Yellow Handkerchief, by Masaru Sato, won the 32nd Mainichi Film Award for Best Music. The music of Mount Hakkoda and Village of Eight Gravestones (Yatsuhakamura) (1977), both by Yasushi Akutagawa, won the 1st Japan Academy Film Prize for Best Music (awarded in 1978). The music of Voltes V includes songs by Mitsuko Horie and Ichiro Mizuki.

== Debuts ==
There were 359 debuts in 1977. The number of re-debuts was 75.

- 25 March: Mizue Takada released her debut single Garasu Zaka
- 25 March: Mari & Red Stripes, including Masamichi Sugi, released "Omoide No Uzu" (Japanese: 思い出の渦)
- 25 October: Shinji Harada released Teens' Blues

== Other singles released ==
- Yasashii Akuma, Shochū Omimai Mōshiagemasu, Un, Deux, Trois and Wana by Candies
- Tsugaru Kaikyō Fuyugeshiki by Sayuri Ishikawa
- Rouge by Naomi Chiaki
- 20 March: Downtown Boogie Woogie Band released Success

== Other albums released ==
- Candies 1½: Yasashii Akuma, Candy Label and Candies 1676 Days by Candies
- Pepper Keibu and Summer Fire '77 by Pink Lady
- Arigatō by Miyuki Nakajima
- Sunshower by Taeko Onuki
- An Insatiable High by Masayoshi Takanaka

== See also ==
- Timeline of Japanese music
- 1977 in Japan
- 1977 in music
- w:ja:1977年の音楽
