= Mako Ishino =

Japanese singer and actress (born 1961)

Mako Ishino 石野 真子
- Born: January 31, 1961 (age 65); Ashiya, Hyōgo, Japan
- Genres: J-pop
- Occupations: Singer, songwriter
- Years active: 1977–present
- Labels: Victor; Come True Records; Pony Canyon
- Website: from1-pro.jp/talent/detail.php?id=24

Mako Ishino (石野真子/眞子; born January 31, 1961), is a Japanese singer and actress. After being discovered by the talent-search show Star Tanjō!, she received a newcomer award at the 20th Japan Record Awards (1978). She has been selected to compete twice on the NHK Kōhaku Uta Gassen.

Born in Ashiya, Hyogo Prefecture, she is the elder sister of actresses Yōko Ishino and Atsuko Ishino.

Ishino is affiliated with From First Production Co., Ltd.

== Curriculum vitae ==
=== Childhood to 1977 debut ===
Born to a family of five, two younger sisters. Her parents ran a company that manufactured handbags made with beads. She enrolled at the Catholic school Yuri Gakuin Junior High School in April 1973, situated in Amagasaki, Hyōgo. After school she helped out with the home business. When she was 3rd year in junior high, she started taking lessons once a week at Masaaki Hirao's music school (then Hirao Masaaki kayō gakuin, Osaka campus).

She moved on to Yuri Gakuin High School in April 1976. The father set a strict 4:30 pm curfew and needed to phone if running late due to extracurricular club activities. After being recruited to become singer, she transferred to Horikoshi High School (showbiz course) starting from the 3rd trimester of the 3rd (graduating) year of high school.

She submitted her application to try out on the Star Tanjō! show in the 1st year of High School at the recommendation of a music school teacher, with the permission from the father who was certain she would not qualify anyway. Ishino made her TV appearance in Star Tanjō! (Osaka) in February 1977, singing Danièle Vidal's Tenshi no rakugaki ("Aime ceux qui t'aiment"), and becoming Osaka regional champion, with an overwhelming score of 530 points (1000 points are divided among 4 contestants). Then in the national grand tournament (Tokyo) that aired in April 1977, she became grand champion, which was followed by various agencies' offers to sign her. She decided to join Burning Production, which had already offered to sign her even she didn't become national champion.

=== As idol: 1978-1981 ===
Ishino debuted with the song Ōkami nanka kowaku nai (lit."Who's afraid of the big bad wolf", (Note: Ōkami nanka kowaku nai is literally "Not afraid of some measly wolf", and not an interrogative, but it is the stock translation of "Who's afraid of the big bad wolf". The song title is apparently spoofed from "Who's afraid of Virginia Woolfe".) March 25, 1978, Victor Records, lyrics by Yū Aku; composed by Takurō Yoshida; cover jacket photo by Kishin Shinoyama. This and her second single Watashi no don ("My mob boss") were both choreographed by Hajime Doi

Her signature facial feature since debut was notably her yaeba (double-teeth upper canines) and tare-me (drooping eyed-ness), and her double-teeth image endured on, even though she had corrective dental surgery to align her teeth by 1985. (Note: On the show Yoru no Hit Studio DELUXE that aire October 30, 1985, Ishino was asked by the hosts Mari Yoshimura and Ichiro Furutachi what happened to the yaeba teeth, to which she replied "Yup, I had it shaved/chiseled off". Professional dentist comment is that Mako Ishino (and others) probably had implants performed, as shaving/chiseling healthy teeth will shorten its longevity.)

On August 27, she held a concert at Seibuen, Shukdai nanka kowaku nai/1-man nin daishūkai (宿題なんか怖くない、1万人大集会; "Who's afraid of [the big bad] homework/10,000 person grand assembly").

Her Shitsuren kinenbi (失恋記念日; "Jilted love memorial day") (October 5, 1978) her third single, which won her the newcomer award at the year's-end 20th Japan Record Awards (December 31, 1978). (Note: The best rookie award went to Machiko Watanabe)。

Other accolades leading up to this are the newcomer award at the Japan Music Awards (Nihon Kayō Taishō) in November, gold medal at the Shinjuku Music Festival on October 12, and the newcomer award at the Yokohama Music Festival on October 25.

She also received her first film role in the film adaptation of the Akutagawa Prize-winning Michitsuna Takahashi's novel Kugatsu no sora (released December). Playing opposite Bandō Shōnosuke, she performed a kissing scene; but as she was not familiar with men and never kissed before, it was quite trying, and though the scene was ok'd at the first cut, she was welling with tears afterwards.

She was cast in the TV series Netsuai Ikka LOVE (aired February 1979).

Her subsequent discography includes Nichiyōbi wa sutorenjā ("Sunday is a stranger", 4th single, January 25, 1979), Pretty Pretty (5th song, April 5), Wonder Boogie (6th song, July 5), Jurī ga raibaru ("Jurī aka Kenji Sawada is the rival", 7th song, September 25).

She won "Golden Dove" for best second year achievement at the 5th Annual Nippon Television Music Festival in August 1979, having co-won the rookie award the previous year. (Note: She had tied votes with Machiko Watanabe.)

She appeared in the 30th Kōhaku Uta Gassen tournament on New Year's Eve, 1979, singing "Jurī is the rival" as the first contestant.

Her Haru La! La! La! ("Spring la la la!l", 8th single, January 1, 1980), with 160,000 in sales was her all-time best hit, followed by Hāto de shōbu ("My heart is my game", (Note: shōbu is literally Win-Lose. It often means "the decisive move" or "gambit".) 9th single, April 5, 1980), which achieved her highest Oricon chart ranking at 15th place.

In March she graduated from Horikoshi High School, having been held back 1 year. She was cast in the TV series Nasakezaka ryokan ("Compassion hill inn", aired starting March 21) where 3 generations of proprietresses were portrayed by Isuzu Yamada, Etsuko Ichihara and Ishino.

Ishino replaced female host Ikue Sakakibara opposite Yosuke Tagawa for the NHK music show Let's Go Young in April 1980, staying on til March 1981.

She was cast in the Toshiba Sunday Theater slot for Oyomechan ("little bride girl", aired starting May 25, 1980), co-starring So Yamamura, Masao Orimo, script by Nobuhiro Orito (折戸伸弘), directed by Shin'ichi Kamoshita, and legendary Fukuko Ishii as producer. (Note: Kamoshita directed her in Netsuai Ikka LOVE in 1979, and Nēchan no natsu later in 1983, also produced by Ishii. The latter was the actress's come-back work after coming out of retirement post-divorce.)

Her Memai ("Vertigo", 10th single, July 5, 1980) appeared.

She was again recipient at the 6th Annual Nippon Television Music Festival in August 1980, this time garnering the Top Idol prize. (Note: Masahiko Kondo won the Top Idol male prize, wresting it from Hiromi Go who had won it years in a row. Similarly, Ishino took this prize after Momoe Yamaguchi had several years' streak winning it.)

She released Kare ga hatsukoi ("He's my first love", 11th single, September 21, 1980) followed by Foggy Rain/Koi no Happy Date (12th single, September 21, 1980). (Note: Twin A-side. Koi no Happy Date was a cover of The Nolans's hit Gotta Pull Myself Together.)

She was selected for the 31th Kōhaku Uta Gassen for the second year in a row, singing Hāto de shōbu.

She released Omoikkiri samba ("Samba with all I've got", 13th single, February 5, 1981), followed by Irodori no kisets ("Season of coloration", 14th single, April 21, 1981),

Mid March 1981, Ishino and Kyu Sakamoto became the new emcees for the "Star Tanjō!" talent-seeking show. (Note: Replacing Hayato Tani (who called himself Takahiro Iwatani at the time) and Tamori.)

=== Retirement as idol ===
In June 1981, she announced her intent to marry singer Tsuyoshi Nagabuchi and retire as singer by the end of August.

She released Koi no Summer Dance (15th single, June 21, 1981), followed by Burning Love (16th single, July 21, 1981) which will be her last as idol.

She performed her farewell tour down and across the country, starting from Kanazawa, Ishikawa on July 26, culminating in the final concert of August 30 at Shibuya Public Hall in Tokyo, which was telecast live.

Ishino married Nagabuchi in Hawaiʻi in January 1982, but the marriage did not last. She separated in March 1983 and officially divorced in May.

=== Return to showbiz ===
Ishino returned to the entertainment business in 1983, at first mainly as an actress, appearing in Nēchan no natsu (ねえちゃんの夏; "Big sister's summer")

Ishino played the middle of three sisters in the TV drama Mune sawagu ichigo tachi, where the eldest sister played by Asami Kobayashi was the lead role.

She released her first single after a 4-year hiatus with Meguriai ("Encounter", 19th single released June 21, 1985).

She was cast in the part of the younger sister of the lead actress in Inochi ("Life", started January 5, 1986), the year-long NHK Taiga drama for that year. Ishino portrayed Sachi, who had a crippled leg from a Tokyo air raid. In later years, the rerun of Inochi became a huge hit in Cuba with an 80% rating, and Ishino became the most well-known Japanese personality in that country.

On July 21, 1987, she released Garasu no kanransha ("Glass Ferris Wheel"), followed on October 21 by Sora ni kanbasu ("Glass Ferris Wheel").

Her second marriage in 1990 to Shun Hiroooka lasted until 1996.

Ishino was cast in the role of Swan Shiratori in the original Japanese Tokusou Sentai Dekaranger (2004–2005). The show was remade into the American version Power Rangers S.P.D. soon after, and back-imported into Japan, dubbed, in 2011, with Ishino as the voice of the narrator. Ishino returned in the role of Swan in the 2024 feature film Tokusou Sentai Dekaranger 20th Fireball Booster.

== Discography ==
=== Albums ===
- Smile (July 25, 1978)
- Mako II (December 5, 1978)
- Mako Live I (June 1, 1979)
- Mako III (August 25, 1979)
- Koi no Disc Jockey MAKO IV (March 5, 1980)
- Watashi no Shiawase MAKO 5 (July 21, 1980)
- Twenty MAKO 6 (February 21, 1981)
- Jeans ni Hakikaete MAKO 7 (July 5, 1981)
- BYE BYE MAKO LIVE ~ 8 tsuki no taiyō yori moete ~ (October 5, 1981)
- Saffron (October 21, 1985)
- Truth (October 25, 2003)
- Memories of the Sea (海の記憶, Umi no Kioku) (2004)
- Mako Revival (2005)
- Mirai (2006)
- Love Merry-go-round (August 20, 2008)
- Watashi no Shiawase (2008)
- Life Is Beautiful (2010)

=== Singles ===
- "Ōkami nanka kowaku nai" (狼なんか怖くない) (1978) (Oricon: 17)
- "Watashi no Don" (わたしの首領) (1978) (Oricon: 26)
- "Shitsuren kinenbi" (失恋記念日) (1978) (Oricon: 24)
- "Nichiyōbi wa Stranger" (日曜日はストレンジャー) (1979) (Oricon: 19)
- "Pretty Pretty" (プリティー・プリティー) (1979) (Oricon: 26)
- "Wonder Boogie" (ワンダー・ブギ) (1979) (Oricon: 22)
- "Julie ga Rival" (ジュリーがライバル) (1979) (Oricon: 24)
- "Haru La! La! La!" (春ラ!ラ!ラ!) (1980) (Oricon: 16)
- "Heart de shōbu" (ハートで勝負) (1980) (Oricon: 15)
- "Memai" (めまい) (1980) (Oricon: 24)
- "Kare ga hatsu koi" (彼が初恋) (1980) (Oricon: 22)
- "Foggy Rain / Koi no Happy Date" (フォギー・レイン/恋のハッピー・デート) (1980) (Oricon: 27)
- "Omoikkiri Samba" (思いっきりサンバ) (1981) (Oricon: 42)
- "Irodori no toki" (彩りの季節) (1981) (Oricon: 35)
- "Koi no Summer Dance" (恋のサマー・ダンス) (1981) (Oricon: 41)
- "Burning Love" (バーニング・ラブ) (1981) (Oricon: 38)
- "Watashi no shiawase PART II" (私のしあわせ PART II) (1981) (Oricon: 56)
- "Ashita ni nareba" (明日になれば) (1982) (Oricon: 52)
- "Meguri ai" (めぐり逢い) (1985)
- "Glass no kanransha" (ガラスの観覧車) (1987)
- "Sora ni Canvas" (空にカンバス) (1987)
- "Kira Kira ∞" (2001)
- "Eve" (2005)
- "Pointing at Me" (こっちを向いて, Kotchi o Muite) (2007)
- "My Friend ~Go on a Journey~" (My Friend ～旅に出よう～, My Friend ~Tabi ni Deyō~) (2010)

=== Videos ===
- Singact 2009 Pan・Dora ~Mako's Breakthrough~ (SINGACT 2009 PAN・DORA～真子の反抗期～, SINGACT 2009 PAN・DORA ~Mako no Hankō-ki~) (2010)
- Band Tour 2010 Life Is Beautiful ~First Live Tour in 29 Years~ (BAND TOUR 2010 Life is beautiful ～29年ぶり素顔のライブツアー～, BAND TOUR 2010 Life is beautiful ~29-Nen-buri sugao no raibutsuā~) (2010)
- Mako Ishino Live & Document 2009 at Shinagawa Church Gloria Chapel ~My Happy Guitar~ (石野真子 LIVE & DOCUMENT 2009 at 品川教会 グローリアチャペル ～MY HAPPY GUITAR～, Ishino Mako LIVE & DOCUMENT 2009 at Shinagawa Kyōkai Gurōriachaperu ～MY HAPPY GUITAR～) (2010)

== Selected filmography ==
=== Television ===
- The Kindaichi Case Files (1995) – Yumiko Ono
- Tokusou Sentai Dekaranger (2004) – Swan Shiratori/Deka Swan
- Boys Over Flowers (2005) – Makino Chieko
- Gunshi Kanbei (2014) – Konishi "Magdalena" Wakusa
- Lost Man Found (2022) – Satoru's mother
- Dear Radiance (2024) – Fujiwara no Mutsuko

=== Film ===
- Hachiko Monogatari (1987) – Chizuko Ueno
- Tokusou Sentai Dekaranger The Movie: Full Blast Action (2004) – Swan Shiratori
- Tokusou Sentai Dekaranger vs. Abaranger (2005) – Swan Shiratori
- Milk White (2004)
- Mahou Sentai Magiranger vs. Dekaranger (2006) – Swan Shiratori
- Tokusou Sentai Dekaranger: 10 Years After (2015) – Swan Shiratori
- Bittersweet (2016)
- Neet Neet Neet (2018)
- Love and the Grand Tug-of-war (2021)
- The Pearl Legacy (2023) – Mitsuyo Ōgame
- Tokusou Sentai Dekaranger: 20th: Fireball Booster (2024) – Swan Shiratori
- True Beauty: Before (2025)
- True Beauty: After (2025)

=== Dubbing ===
- Power Rangers S.P.D. (2005, 2011) – Narrator
