= Goodbye My Love (album) =

Studio album by Teresa Teng
- Released: September 10, 1975
- Recorded: 1975
- Genre: Mandopop
- Length: 45:04
- Language: Mandarin
- Label: Polydor

Teresa Teng chronology
Meiyou Ai Zenme Huo / Yong Xiangai (1975)	Goodbye My Love (1975)	Love Songs of Island, Vol. 2 (1976)

Singles from Goodbye My Love
- 1. "Goodbye My Love" Released: September 10, 1975

Goodbye My Love (Chinese: 再見, 我的愛; pinyin: zàijiàn, wǒ de àirén) is a Mandarin studio album by Taiwanese recording artist Teresa Teng. Goodbye My Love was released as her first record under Polydor Records in Taiwan on September 10, 1975. The album's material consists of Mandarin versions of songs from her first Japanese album, Kuko / Yukigesho (1974).

== Background and release ==
Love Songs of the Island: Goodbye My Love (島國之情歌: 再見, 我的愛人) was released in September 1975. It served as the first installment of Teng's "Love Songs of the Island" album series; the last record of which would be Love Songs of Island, Vol. 8: Messengers of Love in June 1984.

== Songs ==
"Goodbye My Love" is a song that was originally performed by Japanese singer Ann Lewis in 1974. It was composed by Masako Hirao, while the lyrics were penned by Rei Nana. Teng ventured into the Japanese market in 1974 to expand her musical career. During that year, she included the Japanese rendition of "Goodbye My Love" on her debut Japanese album, Kuko / Yukigesho, which was released under PolyGram Records in October 1974.

The following year, in 1975, Teresa Teng released the Chinese version of the song as part of the album Goodbye My Love. It quickly became a signature piece in her repertoire and a staple in her concert performances.

== Track listing ==
Side A
No.	Title	Length
1.	"Lover's Care" (情人的關懷)	3:45
2.	"Please Stop Looking For Me" (請你別再找我)	3:54
3.	"Whether Tonight or Tomorrow" (不論今宵或明天)	2:58
4.	"It's Sweeter to Be Together" (相聚更甜蜜)	3:47
5.	"Flowers Under Rain" (雨下的花朵)	3:20
6.	"Winter Romance" (冬之戀情)	3:38
Total length:		21:22

Side B
No.	Title	Length
7.	"Goodbye My Love" (再見，我的愛人)	3:26
8.	"Who Will Love Me" (誰來愛我)	4:17
9.	"Another Drink" (再來一杯)	3:38
10.	"The Girl Under the Night Mist" (夜霧下的姑娘)	4:25
11.	"Escape the Line" (逃避行)	3:22
12.	"The Ideal of Love" (愛的理想)	4:34
Total length:		23:42

== Credits and personnel ==
- Teresa Teng – vocals
- Kimisho Inomata – composer (1)
- Kyohei Tsutsumi – composer (3)
- Masako Hirao – composer (7)
- Luo Baowen – lyricist (7)
- Feng Tianzhi – composer (7)
- Kenichiro Morioka – composer (7)
