= Yasashii Akuma =

Single by Candies

from the album Candies 1½: Yasashii Akuma
- Language: Japanese
- English title: Sweet Little Devil
- B-side: "Anata no Yesterday"
- Released: March 1, 1977
- Recorded: 1976
- Genre: kayōkyoku; teen pop
- Length: 3:36
- Label: CBS Sony
- Composer: Takuro Yoshida
- Lyricist: Makoto Kitajō
- Producers: Sumio Matsuzaki; Masatoshi Sakai

Candies singles chronology
"Aishū no Symphony" (1976)	"Yasashii Akuma" (1977)	"Shochū Omimai Mōshiagemasu" (1977)

"Yasashii Akuma" (やさしい悪魔; "Sweet Little Devil") is the 14th single by Japanese music trio Candies. Written by Makoto Kitajō and Takuro Yoshida, the single was released on March 1, 1977. The song appeared on their 1977 album Candies 1½: Yasashii Akuma. The promotional dresses were designed by singer Ann Lewis.

The song peaked at No. 4 on Oricon's singles chart and spent 19 weeks in that chart. It sold over 390,000 copies. The trio performed the song on the 28th Kōhaku Uta Gassen.

== Track listing ==
All lyrics are written by Makoto Kitajō; all music is composed by Takuro Yoshida; all music is arranged by Kōji Makaino.

No.	Title	Length
1.	"Yasashii Akuma" ((やさしい悪魔; "Sweet Little Devil"))	3:36
2.	"Anata no Yesterday" (Anata no Iesutadei (あなたのイエスタデイ; "Your Yesterday"))	3:58

== Chart positions ==
Charts (1977)	Peak position
Japanese Oricon Singles Chart	4

== Cover versions ==
- Takurō Yoshida recorded a self-cover of the song in his 1977 album Private.
- Kyōko Koizumi covered the song in her 1988 album Natsumelo.
- The Nolans covered the song in English as "Sweet Little Devil" in their 1991 album Tidal Wave (Samishii Nettaigyo).
- ManaKana covered the song in their 2009 album Futari Uta.
- South Korean girl group Orange Caramel covered the song as their Japanese debut single in 2012.
- Hideaki Tokunaga covered the song in his 2015 album Vocalist 6.
- Machida Girls' Choir covered the song as the B-side of their 2016 single "Koi suru Polka Dot Polka".
- Mie Kuribayashi made a cover of the B-side, "Anata no Yesterday", in 1999, as did Kyōko Koizumi in 1988.

== See also ==
- 1977 in Japanese music
