= Hohoemi Gaeshi =

Single by Candies

from the album Candies Final Carnival Plus One
- Language: Japanese
- English title: Smiling Back
- B-side: "Curtain Call"
- Released: February 25, 1978
- Recorded: 1977
- Genre: kayōkyoku; teen pop
- Length: 4:33
- Label: CBS Sony
- Composer: Yūsuke Hoguchi
- Lyricist: Yoko Aki
- Producers: Sumio Matsuzaki; Masatoshi Sakai

Candies singles chronology
"Wana" (1977)	"Hohoemi Gaeshi" (1978)	"Tsubasa" (1978)

"Hohoemi Gaeshi" (微笑がえし; "Smiling Back") is the 18th single by Japanese music trio Candies. Written by Yoko Aki and Yūsuke Hoguchi, the single was released on February 25, 1978. The song contains certain lyrics of their previous singles "Haru Ichiban", "Un, Deux, Trois", and "Wana".

The song hit No. 1 on Oricon's singles chart and spent 22 weeks in that chart. It sold over 829,000 copies, becoming their only No. 1 single and highest-selling single.

== Track listing ==
All lyrics are written by Yoko Aki; all music is composed and arranged by Yūsuke Hoguchi.

No.	Title	Length
1.	"Hohoemi Gaeshi" ((微笑がえし; "Smiling Back"))	4:33
2.	"Curtain Call" (Kāten Kōru (かーてん・こーる))	4:57

== Chart positions ==
Chart (1978)	Peak position
Japanese Oricon Singles Chart	1

== See also ==
- 1978 in Japanese music
