= Shock! =

- Regular Edition cover

Single by Cute

from the album Shocking 5
- Released: January 6, 2010
- Recorded: 2009
- Genre: J-pop
- Length: 11:22
- Label: Zetima
- Songwriter: Tsunku
- Producer: Tsunku

Cute singles chronology
"Everyday Zekkōchō!!" (2009)	"Shock!" (2010)	"Campus Life (Umarete Kite Yokatta)" (2010)

Music video
- "Shock!" on YouTube

Professional ratings
Review scores
Source	Rating
Hotexpress	Favorable

"Shock!" (stylized as "SHOCK!") is the eleventh major single by Japanese idol pop group Cute. It was released on January 6, 2010, in both normal and limited editions, the limited edition containing a DVD with a version of the "Shock!" PV on it and coming with a different cover. The first press of each edition also contained a card with a serial number on it, used in an event draw to promote the single's release. This was the first single to be released after Erika Umeda's graduation, which also makes it the first single not to feature her. Airi Suzuki is "centred" in this single, taking on the main vocals. The single peaked at #1 on the Oricon daily charts, and #5 on the weekly charts. The single also reached #13 on the monthly chart for January, with a reported total of 23,389 copies sold.

== Track listings ==
=== CD single ===
All lyrics are written by Tsunku; all music is composed by Tsunku.

CD
No.	Title	Arranger	Length
1.	"Shock!" (SHOCK!)	Yūsuke Itagaki
2.	"Ikiyōze!" (生きようぜ!, "Let's Live Life!")	Yasuo Asai
3.	"Shock! (Instrumental)" (SHOCK!（Instrumental）)

Limited Edition DVD
No.	Title	Length
1.	"Shock! (Dance Shot Ver.)"

=== Single V ===
DVD
No.	Title	Length
1.	"SHOCK!"
2.	"SHOCK! (Close-up Ver.)"
3.	"Making of" (メイキング映像)

=== Event V ===
DVD
No.	Title	Length
1.	"SHOCK! (Yajima Maimi Solo Ver.)"
2.	"SHOCK! (Nakajima Saki Solo Ver.)"
3.	"SHOCK! (Suzuki Airi Solo Ver.)"
4.	"SHOCK! (Okai Chisato Solo Ver.)"
5.	"SHOCK! (Hagiwara Mai Solo Ver.)"

== Personnel ==
Track 1

- Yuusuke Itagaki (programming)
- Chino (chorus)

Track 2

- Yasuo Asai (guitar, programming)
- Airi Suzuki (chorus)

== Charts ==
Chart (2010)	Peak position
Oricon Weekly Singles Chart	5
Billboard Japan Hot 100	19
Billboard Japan Hot Top Airplay	69
Billboard Japan Hot Singles Sales	3
Billboard Japan Adult Contemporary Airplay	43
