= Everyday Zekkōchō!! =

- Regular Edition cover

Single by Cute

from the album Shocking 5
- Released: September 16, 2009
- Recorded: 2009
- Genre: J-pop
- Length: 11:16
- Label: Zetima
- Songwriter: Tsunku
- Producer: Tsunku

Cute singles chronology
"Shochū Omimai Mōshiagemasu" (2009)	"Everyday Zekkōchō!!" (2009)	"Shock!" (2010)

Music video
- "Everyday Zekkōchō!!" on YouTube

"Everyday Zekkōchō!!" (EVERYDAY 絶好調!!; "Everyday in top form") is the tenth single by Japanese idol group Cute. It was released on September 16, 2009, in both normal and limited editions, the latter of the two containing a DVD. The first editions of both normal and limited contained a card with a serial number on it, used in a draw as a promotional event. Maimi Yajima and Airi Suzuki were the lead vocalists, and the song peaked at number 2 on the Oricon weekly chart, making number 1 on the daily chart (on September 19). This was also the final single to feature Erika Umeda, before her graduation.

== Track listing ==
All tracks are written by Tsunku.

No.	Title	Length
1.	"Everyday Zekkōchō!!" (EVERYDAY 絶好調!!)
2.	"Amai Wana" (甘い罠, "Sweet Trap")
3.	"Everyday Zekkōchō!! (Instrumental)" (EVERYDAY 絶好調!!（Instrumental）)

Limited Edition DVD
No.	Title	Length
1.	"Everyday Zekkōchō!! (Zekkōchō Ver.)" (EVERYDAY 絶好調!! (絶好調Ver.))

== Charts ==
Chart (2009)	Peak position
Oricon Weekly Singles Chart	2
Billboard Japan Hot 100	19
Billboard Japan Hot Top Airplay	77
Billboard Japan Hot Singles Sales	2
Billboard Japan Adult Contemporary Airplay	99
