= Shinjuku Music Festival =

- Awarded for: Outstanding achievements in the New artist
- Country: Japan
- Presented by: Nippon Cultural Broadcasting
- First award: 1968
- Final award: 1994
- Website: http://www.joqr.co.jp/

The Shinjuku Music Festival (新宿音楽祭, Shinjuku Ongaku-sai) was an annual music awards on the produced by Nippon Cultural Broadcasting.

== Hosts ==
- Iori Sato, Keiko Ochiai (1975)
- Monta Mino (1976–1979)
- Shigeru Kajiwara (1980–1991)
- Yasuo Takeuchi (1992–1994)

== Gold Prize winners ==
- Kyōko Takada, Hashida Norihiko and the Schuberts (1969)
- Hiroshi Itsuki, Saori Minami (1971)
- Megumi Asaoka, Masako Mori (1972)
- Aki Yashiro, Agnes Chan (1973)
- Mineko Nishikawa (1974)
- Hiromi Iwasaki, Takashi Hosokawa (1975)
- Kentaro Shimizu, Mizue Takada (1977)
- Mako Ishino (1978)
- Mariya Takeuchi (1979)
- Toshihiko Tahara, Seiko Matsuda (1980)
- Masahiko Kondō (1981)
- Shibugakitai, Kyōko Koizumi (1982)
- Kōji Kikkawa, Yukiko Okada (1984)
- Minako Honda (1985)
- Shonentai (1986)
- Noriko Sakai, Risa Tachibana (1987)
- Eriko Tamura (1989)
- Mi-Ke, Michiyo Nakajima (1991)

== Silver Prize winners ==
- Junko Sakurada, Momoe Yamaguchi, Mari Natsuki (1973)
- Teresa Teng (1974)
- Hiromi Ōta, Nana Okada (1975)
- Pink Lady (1976)
- Yū Hayami, Iyo Matsumoto, Chiemi Hori (1982)
- Itsumi Osawa, Maiko Itō (1983)
- Yōko Oginome (1984)
- Miyuki Imori, Yōko Ishino (1985)
- BaBe, Hikari Ishida, Fuyumi Sakamoto (1987)
- Naomi Hosokawa (1989)
- Noriko Katō (1992)

== Bronze Prize winners ==
- Eiko Segawa (1970)
- Goro Noguchi (1971)
- Naoko Ken (1972)
- Mayumi Asaka (1973)
- Jun Fubuki, Yūko Asano (1974)
- Yoshimi Ashikawa (1976)
- Mayo Kawasaki (1977)
- Southern All Stars, Lazy (1978)
- Hiroko Mita (1982)
- Yoko Minamino, Yui Asaka (1985)
- Anna Makino (1987)
- Kaori Kozai (1988)

- In 1988, all 20 prize winners were given the Bronze Award because the awards ceremony was cancelled due to the deteriorating health of Emperor Shōwa.

== Venues ==
- 1968-1970s, 1990s-1994: Koseinenkin Hall
- 1970s-1980s: Nippon Budokan

== See also ==
- Festival della canzone italiana
