= Pepper Keibu =

Pepper Keibu may refer to:

- "Pepper Keibu" (song), a 1976 song by Pink Lady
- Pepper Keibu (album), a 1977 album by Pink Lady
