= Aishū no Symphony =

Single by Candies

from the album Candies 1½: Yasashii Akuma
- Language: Japanese
- English title: Symphony of Sorrow
- B-side: "Wakarete mo Aishite"
- Released: November 21, 1976
- Recorded: 1976
- Genre: kayōkyoku; teen pop
- Length: 3:44
- Label: CBS Sony
- Composer: Takashi Miki
- Lyricist: Rei Nakanishi
- Producers: Sumio Matsuzaki; Masatoshi Sakai

Candies singles chronology
"Heart Dorobō" (1976)	"Aishū no Symphony" (1976)	"Yasashii Akuma" (1977)

"Aishū no Symphony" (哀愁のシンフォニー, Aishū no Shinfonī; "Symphony of Sorrow") is the 12th single by Japanese music trio Candies. Written by Rei Nakanishi and Takashi Miki, the single was released on November 21, 1976. The song appeared on their 1977 album Candies 1½: Yasashii Akuma. An earlier version of this song, "Kiri no Wakare" (霧のわかれ; "Separated in the Fog"), appears on a special edition of their compilation album Candies: Time Capsule.

The song peaked at No. 12 on Oricon's singles chart and spent 18 weeks in that chart. It sold over 288,000 copies.

== Track listing ==
All lyrics are written by Rei Nakanishi.

No.	Title	Music	Arrangement	Length
1.	"Aishū no Symphony" (Aishū no Shinfonī (哀愁のシンフォニー; "Symphony of Sorrow"))	Takashi Miki	Kōji Makaino	3:44
2.	"Wakarete mo Aishite" ((別れても愛して; "Goodbye, Love"))	Miki	Miki	3:59

== Chart positions ==
Charts (1976)	Peak position
Japanese Oricon Singles Chart	12

== See also ==
- 1976 in Japanese music
