= Summer Fire '77 =

Live album by Pink Lady
- Released: September 10, 1977
- Recorded: July 26, 1977
- Venue: Denen Coliseum
- Genre: J-pop; kayōkyoku; disco; teen pop
- Length: 80:28
- Language: Japanese; English
- Label: Victor
- Producer: Hisahiko Iida

Pink Lady chronology
Challenge Concert (1977)	Summer Fire '77 (1977)	Best Hits Album (1977)

Summer Fire '77 (サマー・ファイア'77, Samā Faia Nana-jū Nana) is the second live album by Japanese idol duo Pink Lady, released through Victor Entertainment on September 10, 1977. It was recorded live at the duo's first summer concert at Denen Coliseum on July 26, 1977.

The album peaked at No. 2 on Oricon's weekly albums chart and sold over 130,000 copies.

== Track listing ==
CD Disc 1
No.	Title	Writer(s)	Length
1.	"Opening" (Ōpuningu (オープニング))		3:00
2.	"Medley I (メドレー I, Medorē Wan): "Black Is Black" (ブラック・イズ・ブラック, Burakku Izu Burakku); "Love Potion No. 9" (ラブ・ポーション・No.９, Rabu Pōshon Nanbā Nainu); "Rock and Roll Love Letter" (ロックン・ロール・ラブレター, Rokkun Rōru Raburetā); "I Believe in Music" (アイ・ビリーブ・イン・ミュージック, Ai Birību in Myūjikku)"	Michelle Grainger; Tony Hayes; Steve Wadey; Jerry Leiber and Mike Stoller; Tim Moore; Mac Davis	6:57
3.	"Pepper Keibu" (Peppā Keibu (ペッパー警部; "Inspector Pepper"))	Yū Aku; Shunichi Tokura	4:26
4.	"Dancing Queen" (Danshingu Kuīn (ダンシング・クィーン))	Benny Andersson; Björn Ulvaeus; Stig Anderson	3:11
5.	"Love Rules" (Koi wa Ōkei (恋はOK; "Love Is Okay"))	Ronnie Scott; Steve Wolfe	3:04
6.	"Rock and Roller Coaster" (Rokkun Rōrā Kōsutā (ロックン・ローラー・コースター))	David Bartlett; Emilio Castillo; Stephen Kupka	2:40
7.	"Kanpai Ojōsan" ((乾杯お嬢さん; "Cheers, Miss"))	Aku; Tokura	3:10
8.	"S.O.S."	Aku; Tokura	2:29
9.	"Stop! In the Name of Love" (Sutoppu In za Nēmu obu Rabu (ストップ・イン・ザ・ネーム・オブ・ラブ))	Holland–Dozier–Holland	2:13
10.	"Mercy, Mercy, Mercy" (Māshī Māshī Māshī (マーシー・マーシー・マーシー))	Joe Zawinul	3:11
11.	"Motown Story (モータウン・ストーリー, Mōtaun Sutōrī): "Motown Overture" (モータウン・オーバチュア, Mōtaun Ōbachua); "Money (That's What I Want)" (マネー, Manē); "Please Mr. Postman" (プリーズ・ミスター・ポストマン, Purīzu Misutā Posutoman); "I Want You Back" (アイ・ウォント・ユー・バック, Ai Uonto Yū Bakku); "You Keep Me Hangin' On" (ユー・キープ・ミー・ハンギン・オン, Yū Kīpu Mī Hangin On)"	Berry Gordy; Janie Bradford; Georgia Dobbins; William Garrett; Freddie Gorman; Brian Holland; Robert Bateman; The Corporation; Holland–Dozier–Holland	5:51

CD Disc 2
No.	Title	Writer(s)	Length
1.	"Sir Duke" (Aisuru Deyūku (愛するデューク))	Stevie Wonder	2:42
2.	"Evergreen (Mie solo)" (Ebā Gurīn (エバー・グリーン))	Barbra Streisand; Paul Williams	2:32
3.	"Hotel California (Kei solo)" (Hoteru Kariforunia (ホテル・カリフォルニア))	Don Felder; Don Henley; Glenn Frey	4:01
4.	"Medley II (メドレーII, Medorē Tsū): "What'd I Say" (ホワット・アイ・セイ, Howatto Ai Sei); "Unchain My Heart" (アンチェイン・マイ・ハート, Anchein Mai Hāto); "Go-Kart Twist" (サンライト・ツイスト, Sanraito Tsuisuto); "(Get Your Kicks on) Route 66" (ルート66, Rūto Shikkusutī Shikkusu); "Dynamite" (ダイナマイト, Dainamaito); "Johnny B. Goode" (ジョニー・ビー・グッド, Jonī Bī Guddo); "Rock and Roll Music" (ロックン・ロール・ミュージック, Rokkun Rōru Myūjikku)"	Ray Charles; Bobby Sharp; Teddy Powell; Ennio Morricone; Bobby Troup; Harvey Averne; Chuck Berry	12:24
5.	"Commercial Medley (CMメドレー, Komāsharu Medorē): Cow Brand Soap (牛乳石鹸, Gyūnyū Sekken); National (ナショナル, Nashonaru)"	Aku; Tokura	4:05
6.	"Carmen '77" (Karumen Nanajū-nana (カルメン '77))	Aku; Tokura	3:11
7.	"Nagisa no Sindbad" (Nagisa no Shindobaddo (渚のシンドバッド; "Sindbad of the Beach"))	Aku; Tokura	2:25
8.	"It Must Be Him" (Itto Masto Bī Himu (イット・マスト・ビー・ヒム))	Gilbert Bécaud	4:42
9.	"Goodbye Jimmy, Goodbye" (Guddo Bai Jimī Guddo Bai (グッド・バイ・ジミー・グッド・バイ))	Jack Vaughn	2:01
10.	"Bye, Bye, Baby (Baby Goodbye)" (Bai Bai Beibī ~Sayonara no Uta~ (バイ・バイ・ベイビー ～サヨナラの歌～))	Bob Crewe; Bob Gaudio	2:13

== Charts ==
Chart (1977)	Peak position
Japanese Oricon Albums Chart	2

== See also ==
- 1977 in Japanese music
