= Bye Bye Bye! =

- Regular Edition cover

Single by Cute

from the album Shocking 5
- Released: April 15, 2009
- Genre: J-pop
- Label: Zetima
- Songwriter: Tsunku
- Producer: Tsunku

Cute singles chronology
"Forever Love" (2008)	"Bye Bye Bye!" (2009)	"Shochū Omimai Mōshiagemasu" (2009)

Music video
- "Bye Bye Bye!" on YouTube

"Bye Bye Bye!" is the eighth single by the Japanese idol group Cute. It was released on April 15, 2009, both as a normal CD and a limited edition CD + DVD package. Both editions contained a card with a serial number on it used in a draw, as a promotional event for the single. Since Kanna Arihara was not performing at the time of recording (before later leaving the group without ever having returned), it was the first single without every current member. Maimi Yajima and Airi Suzuki are the lead vocalists. Mai Hagiwara is the minor vocalist and the center. It debuted at number 4 in the Oricon Weekly Singles Chart and remained in the chart for 4 weeks.

== Track listing ==
All tracks are written by Tsunku.

CD
No.	Title	Length
1.	"Bye Bye Bye!"
2.	"Go Go Go!"
3.	"Bye Bye Bye! (Instrumental)"

DVD
No.	Title	Length
1.	"Bye Bye Bye!" (music video)
2.	"Bye Bye Bye! (Close-up Ver.)"
3.	"Making-of" (メイキング映像)

== Charts ==
Chart (2009)	Peak position
Oricon Weekly Singles Chart	4
Billboard Japan Hot 100	11
Billboard Japan Hot Top Airplay	64
Billboard Japan Hot Singles Sales	3
Billboard Japan Adult Contemporary Airplay	87
