= 26th Japan Record Awards =

1984 Japanese music awards ceremony

- Date: 31 December 1984
- Venue: Imperial Garden Theater, Tokyo
- Hosted by: Takero Morimoto, Keiko Takeshita

Television/radio coverage
- Network: TBS

The 26th Japan Record Awards were held on 31 December 1984, and were broadcast live on TBS.

The audience rating was 30.4%.

== Award winners ==
- Japan Record Award:
  - Hiroshi Itsuki for "Nagaragawa Enka"
- Best Vocalist:
  - Takashi Hosokawa
- Best New Artist:
  - Yukiko Okada
- Best Album:
  - Mariko Takahashi for "Triad"

== See also ==
- 1984 in Japanese music
