= Tsubasa (Candies song) =

Single by Candies

from the album Candies 1676 Days
- Language: Japanese
- English title: Wings
- B-side: "Good Bye Times"
- Released: November 21, 1978
- Recorded: 1978
- Genre: kayōkyoku; teen pop
- Length: 4:45
- Label: CBS Sony
- Composer: Shigeki Watanabe
- Lyricist: Ran Itō
- Producers: Sumio Matsuzaki; Masatoshi Sakai

Candies singles chronology
"Hohoemi Gaeshi" (1978)	"Tsubasa" (1978)

"Tsubasa" (つばさ; "Wings") is the 19th and final single by Japanese music trio Candies. Written by Ran Itō and Shigeki Watanabe, the single was released on November 21, 1978, seven months after the trio's disbandment.

The song peaked at No. 16 on Oricon's singles chart and spent 14 weeks in that chart. It sold over 109,000 copies.

== Track listing ==
No.	Title	Lyrics	Music	Arrangement	Length
1.	"Tsubasa" ((つばさ; "Wings"))	Ran Itō	Shigeki Watanabe	Watanabe	4:45
2.	"Good Bye Times" (Guddo Bai Taimusu (グッド・バイ・タイムス))	Yoko Aki	Yūsuke Hoguchi	Hoguchi	4:28

== Chart positions ==
Chart (1978)	Peak position
Japanese Oricon Singles Chart	16

== See also ==
- 1978 in Japanese music
