= Sunmyu =

Japanese idol girl group

Sunmyu~ さんみゅ〜
- Origin: Japan
- Genres: J-Pop, Japanese Idols
- Years active: 2012–2020
- Label: Pony Canyon
- Past members: Nishizono Misuzu; Ayana Kinoshita; Yayoi Kobayashi; Sena Niihara; Mami Noda; Tsubasa Goto Jenny; Sae Nakayama; Yuka Kyogoku; Haruka Yamauchi; Reika Hasegawa
- Website: sunmyu.com

Sunmyu~ (さんみゅ～) was a Japanese idol girl group that formed in 2012 and disbanded in 2020.

The band had two singles reach the top ten on the weekly Oricon Singles Chart, with their best-charting single "Togetoge" (トゲトゲ) reaching fifth place on the chart.

The group's catchphrase was "Bright, energetic, and refreshing! The first pure white idols of the 21st century." (明るく、元気に、爽やかに 21世紀最初の純白アイドル。), with the phrase "Bright, energetic, and refreshing" being derived from Sun Music's founding principles.

== History ==
Sun Music had previously produced legendary 1980s idols including Seiko Matsuda, Yu Hayami, Yukiko Okada, and Noriko Sakai. Sunmyu would be the first idols produced by Sun Music in 21 years since Michiyo Nakajima, as well as their first idol group. The group's concept centered on reviving "classic 1980s idol style," distinguishing them from contemporary idol groups that emphasized intense choreography and stylish costumes.

The name Sunmyu was derived from their agency name, Sun Music, and was coined by Hideyoshi Aizawa, who was chairman of the Sun Music Group at the time. Aizawa passed away shortly before the group's first major solo concert since their debut.

The Sun Music idol project began in May 2011 with auditions of nearly 1,000 women from Sun Music Academy. The group was whittled down to 11 members by November, known as the "first generation students". In March 2012 seven more members were added, increasing the group to 18 idols; these seven are sometimes called the "second generation". Following a live performance on 5 May and the "Sanmyu~ Final Member Selection" on 1 July, a total of 10 members were selected for the initial group; 9 members chosen by Sun Music, and one member selected by votes from viewers of Niconico Live Broadcasting. The group initially went by the name Sunmyu~ (β) as they were a "beta of version of the prototype" and wanted to achieve "β" via their major debut.

Shortly after forming, the group focused on performing covers of 1980s idol songs. On 4 August 2012, Sunmyu~ (β) debuted with their first single "Kuchibiru Network" (くちびるNetwork), a cover of the 1986 song by their senior at the agency, Yukiko Okada. On 3 November they released the single "First Date" (ファースト・デイト), and their label Pony Canyon made the surprise announcement that their major debut would be 23 January 2013. On 24 November, 2012, at a pre-order handshake event for "Kuchibiru Network" held in Ikebukuro, it was announced that the “β” had been removed from the group’s name "Sunmyu~ (β)", making them simply "Sunmyu~".

They gradually incorporated more original compositions, with their fourth single as Sunmyu~, "This is Love" (これが愛なんだ) releasing on 20 November 2013 featuring an original song as the lead track for the first time.

From April 2016, Sunmyu began hosting regular concerts featuring guest appearances by legendary 1980s idols such as Miyuki Kosaka, Minayo Watanabe, and Yu Hayami. Starting in September 2014, Sunmyu became known as "Disaster Prevention Idols" (防災アイドル) following their participation in a disaster prevention campaign event. They collaborated with the Tokyo Fire Department on a disaster prevention song called "Sonae areba Urei Nancy" (ソナえあればウレいナンシー), based on Yu Hayami's hit song "Natsuiro no Nancy". In 2015, they were appointed as image characters for the Tokyo Fire Department's Disaster Prevention Week poster.

On March 1, 2020, the members of Sunmyu graduated on to individual pursuits. This effectively disbanded the group, and they said goodbye with a final performance titled "Sanmyu ~ FINAL LIVE - Let's Meet in Dreams".

== Discography ==
=== Albums ===
Title	Release date	Oricon
Mirai chizu	August 6, 2014	43

=== Singles ===
Title	Release date	Oricon
"Kuchibiru Network"	January 23, 2013	57
"Hoho ni Kiss Shite"	April 24, 2013	91
"Natsumatsuri"	July 3, 2013	45
"Kore ga ai Nanda"	November 20, 2013	33
"Haru ga kite Bokutachi wa Mata Sukoshi Otona ni Naru"	March 19, 2014	12
"Junjō Mermaid"	July 2, 2014	13
"Hatsuyuki no Symphony"	November 19, 2014	18
"Hajimari no Melody"	March 18, 2015	9
"Toge Toge" (トゲトゲ)	October 7, 2015	5
“Sakurairo Promise / Kaze no Mirage”	March 15, 2017	16
