= 19th Japan Record Awards =

1977 Japanese music awards ceremony

- Date: 31 December 1977
- Venue: Imperial Garden Theater, Tokyo
- Hosted by: Keizo Takahashi, Tetsuko Kuroyanagi, Hiroshi Kume

Television/radio coverage
- Network: TBS

The 19th Annual Japan Record Awards took place at the Imperial Garden Theater in Chiyoda, Tokyo, on 31 December 1977, starting at 7:00PM JST. The primary ceremonies were televised in Japan on TBS.

The audience rating was 50.8%.

== Winners ==
=== Japan Record Award ===
- Kenji Sawada – "Katte ni Shiyagare"

- Lyrics: Yū Aku
- Music: Katsuo Ōno
- Arrangement: Motoki Funayama
- Record Company: Polydor Records

=== Best Vocalist ===
- Aki Yashiro for "Ai No Shuuchakueki"
- Awarded again after last year, second-best vocalist award.

=== Best New Artist ===
- Kentaro Shimizu for "Shitsuren Restaurant"

=== Singing Award ===
- Momoe Yamaguchi – "Cosmos"
- Hiromi Iwasaki – "Shisūki"
- Sayuri Ishikawa – "Tsugaru Kaikyō Fuyugeshiki"

=== Popular Award ===
- Pink Lady – "Wanted (Shimei Tehai)"
  - Awarded again after last year's Newcomer award.

=== Newcomer Award ===
- Karyūdo – Azusa No. 2
- Ikue Sakakibara – Al Pacino + Alain Delon < You
- Mizue Takada – Glass-zaka
- Yosuke Tagawa – Lui-Lui

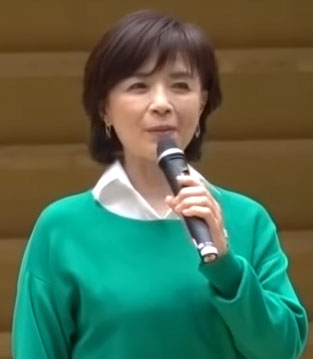
Ikue Sakakibara, awarded newcomer award.

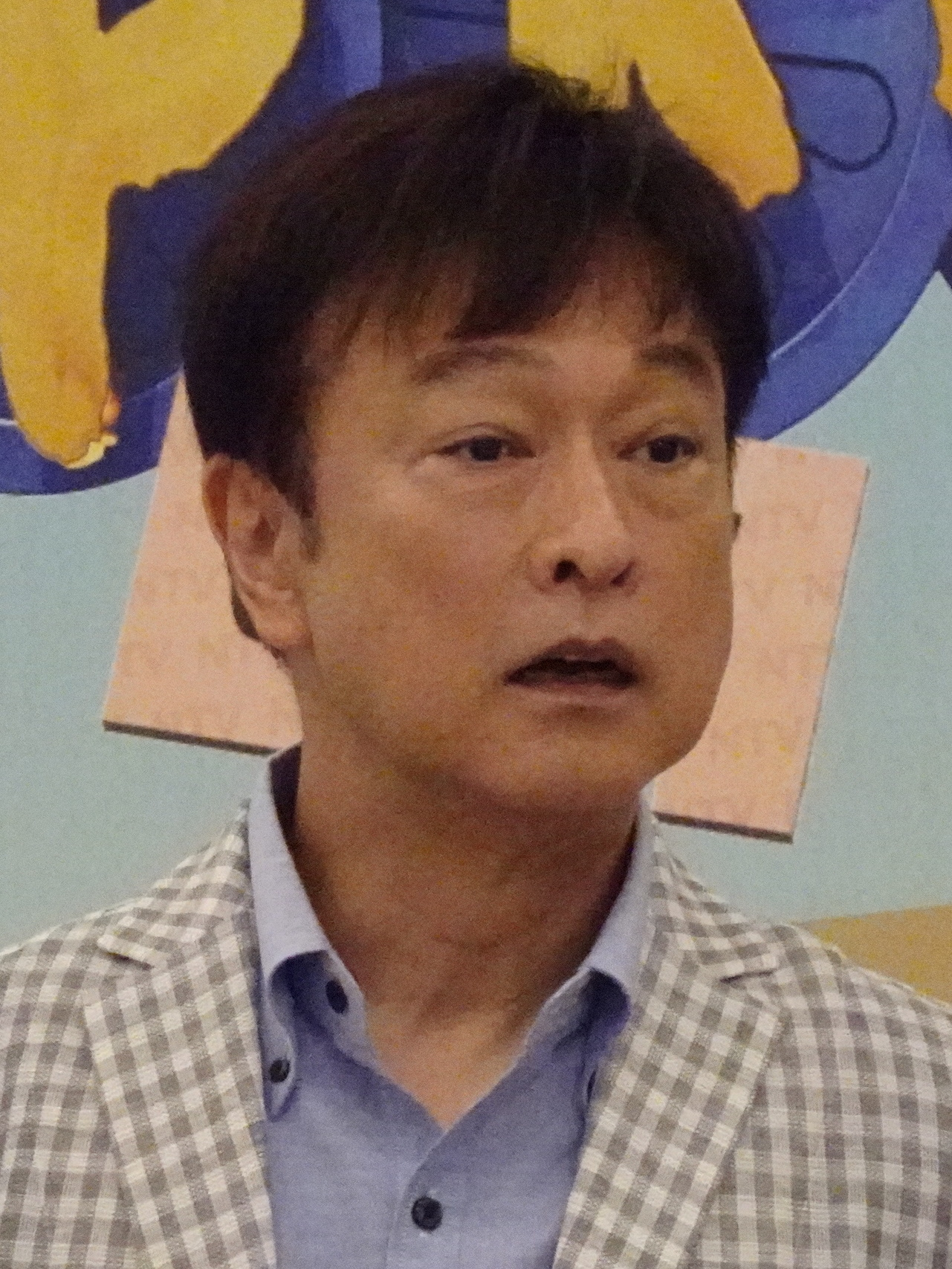
Yosuke Tagawa, awarded newcomer award.

=== Shinpei Nakayama Award (Composition Award) ===
- Hiromi Iwasaki – "Shisūki" / Sayuri Ishikawa – "Tsugaru Kaikyō Fuyugeshiki"

- Composer: Takashi Miki

=== Arrangement Award ===
- Kenji Sawada – "Katte ni Shiyagare" / Akira Fuse – "Ryoshū ~Igaruganite~"

- Arrangement: Motoki Funayama

=== Yaso Saijō Award (Lyricist Award) ===
- Masashi Sada – "Ame Yadori" / Momoe Yamaguchi – "Cosmos"

- Lyrics: Masashi Sada

=== Special Award ===
- Minoru Obata
- Akira Kobayashi
- Frank Nagai
  - Awarded again after 2 years, 2nd special award.
- Hachiro Kasuga
  - Awarded again after 9 years, 2nd special award.

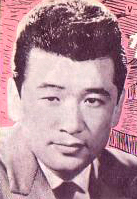
Frank Nagai, awarded his 2nd special award, 6th time awarded in JRA.

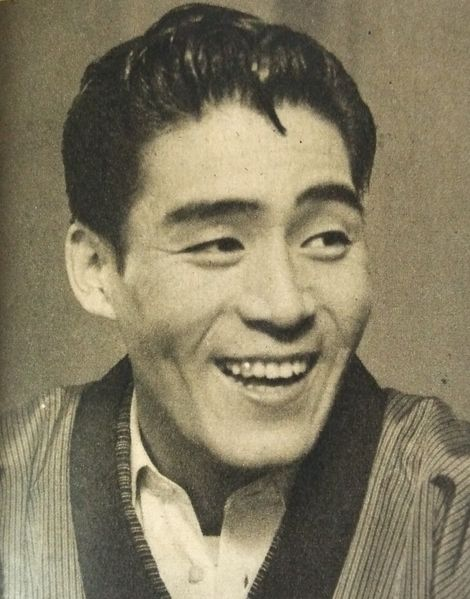
Hachiro Kasuga, awarded his 2nd special award after 9 years.

== Nominations ==
=== Best 10 JRA Nominations ===
Song	Singer	Award	Votes
Ai No Shuuchakueki	Aki Yashiro	Best Vocalist	N/A
Ai No Memory	Shigeru Matsuzaki	N/A	N/A
Kaze No Eki	Goro Noguchi	N/A	N/A
Katte Ni Shiyagare	Kenji Sawada	Japan Record Award	42
Kimagure Venus	Junko Sakurada	N/A	N/A
Cosmos	Momoe Yamaguchi	Vocalist Award	2
Shishuuki	Hiromi Iwasaki	Vocalist Award	2
Tsugaru Kaikyō Fuyugeshiki	Sayuri Ishikawa	Vocalist Award	3
Hoshi No Suna	Rumiko Koyanagi	N/A	N/A
Button Wo Hazuse	Hideki Saijo	N/A	N/A

=== Best New Artist ===
Song	Singer	Votes
Azusa No. 2	Karyūdo	7
Al Pacino + Alain Delon < You	Ikue Sakakibara	0
Shitsuren Restaurant	Kentaro Shimizu	30
Glass-zaka	Mizue Takada	12
Lui-Lui	Yosuke Tagawa	0

== See also ==
- 1977 in Japanese music
