= Kuchibiru Network =

Single by Yukiko Okada

from the album Venus Tanjou
- Language: Japanese
- English title: Lips Network
- B-side: Koi no Etude
- Released: January 29, 1986
- Genre: J-pop; kayōkyoku
- Length: 3:53
- Label: Pony Canyon
- Composer: Ryuichi Sakamoto
- Lyricist: Seiko Matsuda

"Kuchibiru Network" (Japanese: くちびる Network, Hepburn: lit. "Lips Network") is the eighth and final single from Japanese idol singer Yukiko Okada, released on 29 January 1986. It reached number 1 on the Oricon Weekly Singles Chart, and was Okada's only single to do so. It sold 231,000 copies. The B-side is 'Koi no Etude' (恋のエチュード, lit. "Love Etude").

== Background ==
Okada's previous single, "Love Fair", was written and composed by Tetsurō Kashibuchi and arranged by Masataka Matsutoya. Both had worked on several singles for Okada throughout her career. It peaked at number 5 on the Oricon chart in October 1985.

In 1986, singer Seiko Matsuda was on hiatus due to her pregnancy, and wrote the lyrics for "Kuchibiru Network" during this time. Matsuda and Okada belonged to the same talent agency, Sun Music, and Okada was often labelled 'the next Seiko Matsuda'. Ryuichi Sakamoto of Yellow Magic Orchestra composed the song. The song garnered attention due to the celebrity status of Matsuda and Sakamoto.

== Release and reception ==
"Kuchibiru Network" was released on January 29, 1986. It debuted at number 1 on the Oricon Weekly Singles Chart, and sold 231,000 copies. It was Okada's only number 1 single, and would be her final release before her death on April 8, 1986.

On January 23, 2013, idol group Sunmyu debuted with a cover of "Kuchibiru Network". The group also belonged to the Sun Music agency, under the Pony Canyon label.

== See also ==
- 1986 in Japanese music
