= Candy Label =

Studio album by Candies
- Released: September 1, 1977
- Recorded: 1977
- Genre: kayōkyoku; teen pop
- Length: 51:25
- Language: Japanese
- Label: CBS Sony
- Producer: Sumio Matsuzaki; Masatoshi Sakai

Candies chronology
Ketteiban Candies (1977)	Candy Label (1977)	The Best: Candies Shop (1977)

Singles from Candy Label
- 1. "Shochū Omimai Mōshiagemasu" Released: June 21, 1977

Candy Label (キャンディ・レーベル, Kyandi Rēberu) is the ninth studio album by Japanese idol trio Candies, released through CBS Sony on September 1, 1977. It contains the single "Shochū Omimai Mōshiagemasu". The album originally consisted of one 12-inch LP and one 7-inch EP with songs themed around the word "candy". Side B features covers of The Peanuts' songs.

== Charts ==
This album reached number 7 on the Japanese LPs chart published in Cash Box.

== Track listing ==
12-inch side A
No.	Title	Lyrics	Music	Arrangement	Length
1.	"Kigaru na Tabi" ((気軽な旅; "A Carefree Travel"))	Makoto Kitajō	Nobuo Tsunetomi	Kōji Makaino	3:21
2.	"Aishite Iirebakoso" ((愛していればこそ; "Only If You Love Me"))	Kazuya Senke	Yūsuke Hoguchi	Hoguchi	3:23
3.	"All You Get from Love Is a Love Song" (Futari no Ravu Songu (ふたりのラヴ・ソング; "Our Love Song"))	Steve Eaton; Yukinojo Mori	Eaton	Makaino	4:02
4.	"Orange no Umi" (Orenji no Umi (オレンジの海; "The Orange Sea"))	Kitajō	Hoguchi	Hoguchi	3:28
5.	"Glass no Hoshi" (Garasu no Hoshi (ガラスの星; "Glass Star"))	Kitajō	Takashi Miki	Miki	4:10
6.	"Shochū Omimai Mōshiagemasu" ((暑中お見舞い申し上げます; "Midsummer Greetings"))	Kitajō	Juichi Sase	Makaino	3:02

12-inch side B
No.	Title	Lyrics	Music	Arrangement	Length
1.	"Furimukanaide" ((ふりむかないで; "Don't Look Back"))	Tokiko Iwatani	Hiroshi Miyagawa	Reijirō Koroku	3:23
2.	"Ashita ni Nareba" ((明日になれば; "If Tomorrow"))	Kazumi Yasui	Miyagawa	Hiroshi Takada	2:53
3.	"Koi no Vacance" (Koi no Bakansu (恋のバカンス; "Love Vacation"))	Iwatani	Miyagawa	Takada	2:21
4.	"Kotchi wo Muite" ((こっちを向いて; "Turn This Way"))	Chikashi Akimoto	Miyagawa	Koroku	2:55
5.	"Koi no Fugue" (Koi no Fūga (恋のフーガ; "Love Fugue"))	Rei Nakanishi	Koichi Sugiyama	Koroku	2:31
6.	"Ai no Finale" (Ai no Fināre (愛のフィナーレ; "Love Finale"))	Nakanishi	Miyagawa	Takada	4:31

7-inch side A
No.	Title	Lyrics	Music	Arrangement	Length
1.	"Candy" (Kyandi (キャンディ))	Yukinojo Mori	Makaino	Makaino	3:01
2.	"Candy Twist" (Kyandi Tsuisuto (キャンディ・ツイスト))	Mori	Makaino	Makaino	2:46

7-inch side B
No.	Title	Lyrics	Music	Arrangement	Length
1.	"Candy Sunday" (Kyandi Sandē (キャンディ・サンデー))	Kitajō	Makaino	Makaino	2:20
2.	"Sugar Candy Kisses" (Shugā Kyandi Kissu (シュガー・キャンディ・キッス))	Wayne Bickerton; Tony Waddington; Mori	Bickerton; Waddington	Makaino	3:18

== See also ==
- 1977 in Japanese music
