= 20th Japan Record Awards =

1978 Japanese music awards ceremony

- Date: 31 December 1978
- Venue: Imperial Garden Theater, Tokyo
- Hosted by: Keizo Takahashi, Tetsuko Kuroyanagi, Hiroshi Kume

Television/radio coverage
- Network: TBS

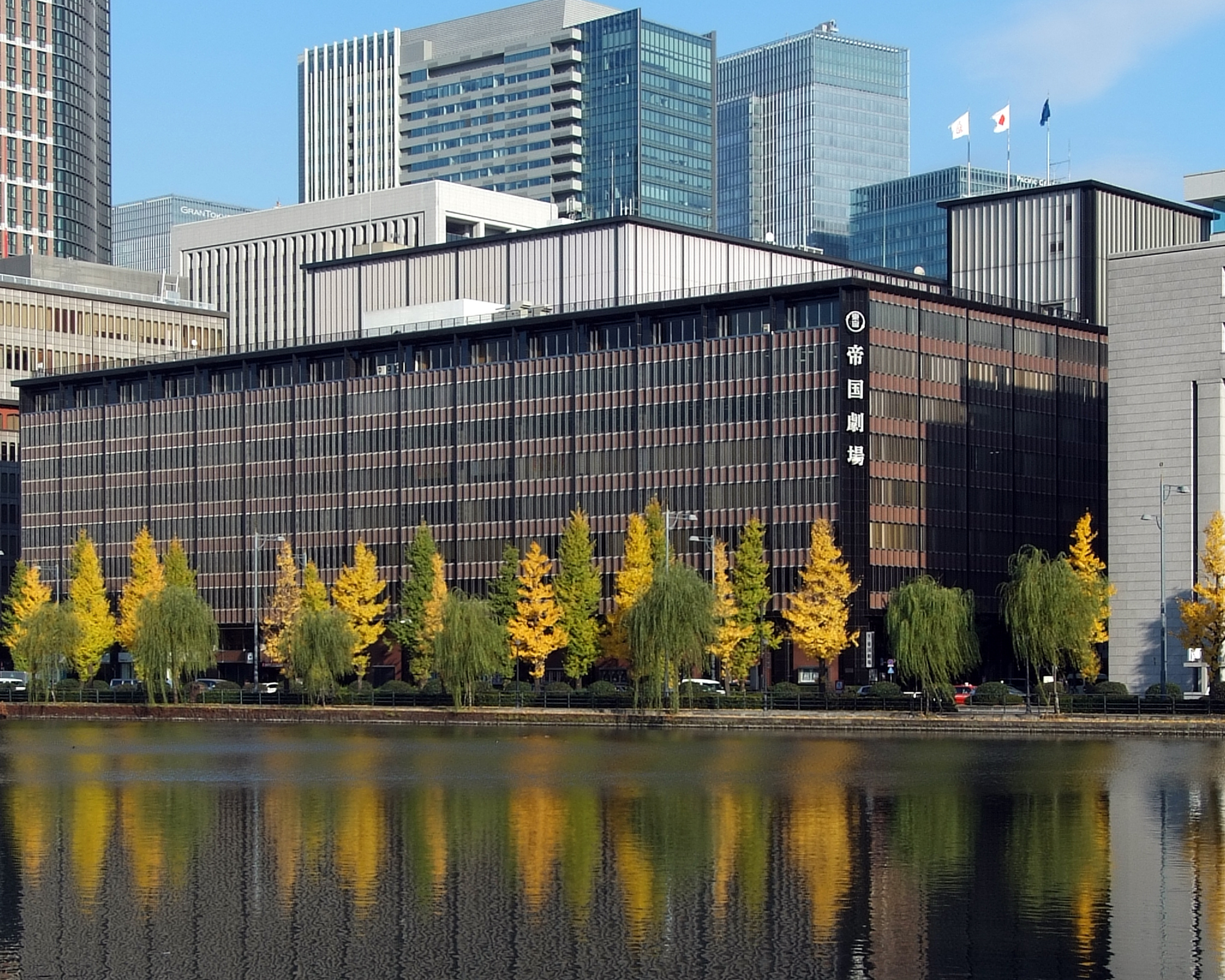
Imperial Garden Theater, Marunouchi Tokyo, Japan.

The 20th Annual Japan Record Awards took place at the Imperial Garden Theater in Chiyoda, Tokyo, on 31 December 1978, starting at 7:00PM JST. The primary ceremonies were televised in Japan on TBS.

The audience rating was 42.9%.

== Winners ==
=== Japan Record Award ===
- Pink Lady – "UFO"

- Lyrics: Yū Aku
- Music and arrangement: Shunichi Tokura
- Record Company: JVC Victor

=== Best Vocalist ===
- Kenji Sawada

=== Best New Artist ===
- Machiko Watanabe

=== Gold Award ===
- Naoko Ken – "Kamome wa Kamome"
- Goro Noguchi – "Good Luck"
- Junko Sakurada – "Shiawase Shibai"
- Hiromi Iwasaki – "Cinderella Honeymoon"
- Junko Ohashi – "Tasogare My Love"
- Aki Yashiro – "Kokyō e..."
- Hideki Saijo – "Blue Sky Blue"
- Momoe Yamaguchi – "Playback Part 2"
- Pink Lady – "UFO"
- Kenji Sawada – "Love (Dakishimetai)"

=== Newcomer Award ===
- Mako Ishino – "Shitsuren Kinenbi"
- Muneyuki Satō – "Aoba Jōkoi Uta"
- Teppei Shibuya – "Deep"
- Rie Nakahara – "Kamome ga Tonda hi"
- Masanori Sera & Twist – "Hikigane" (Declined)

=== Shinpei Nakayama Award (Composition Award) ===
- Mayo Shōno – "Tonde Istanbul" / Rie Nakahara – "Tokyo Lullaby"

- Composer: Kyōhei Tsutsumi

=== Arrangement Award ===
- Circus – "Mr. Summertime"

- Arrangement: Norio Maeda

=== Yaso Saijō Award (Lyrics Award) ===
- Tokiko Kato – "Kono Sora wo Tobetara" / Junko Sakurada – "Shiawase Shibai"

- Lyrics: Miyuki Nakajima

=== Special Award ===
- Noriko Awaya
- Masato Fujita
- Teichiku Records

== See also ==
- 1978 in Japanese music
