= Yukiko Okada =

Japanese pop singer (1967–1986)

- 岡田 有希子
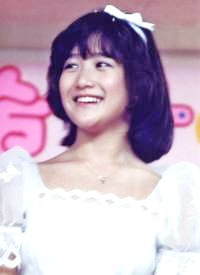
- Yukiko Okada in 1984
- Born: Kayo Satō (佐藤 佳代); August 22, 1967; Ichinomiya, Aichi, Japan
- Died: April 8, 1986 (aged 18); Shinjuku, Tokyo, Japan
- Cause of death: Suicide by jumping from height
- Burial place: Aisai, Aichi
- Other name: Yukko
- Education: Nagoya Koyo Senior High School; Horikoshi High School
- Occupations: Singer, actress
- Years active: 1983–1986
- Era: Showa
- Agent: Sun Music
- Label: Canyon
- Musical career
- Genre: Kayōkyoku

Signature
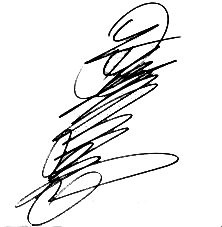

Kayo Satō (佐藤佳代) (August 22, 1967 – April 8, 1986), known professionally as Yukiko Okada (岡田 有希子) was a Japanese singer and actress, active in the mid-1980s. After winning a nationwide television show at age 15 in 1983, she debuted as an idol in 1984. Her death by suicide two years later led to a number of copycat suicides, a phenomenon that would bear her name.

== Early life ==
Yukiko Okada was born as Kayo Satō on August 22, 1967, the second daughter of the Satō family. The family later moved to Nagoya. In elementary school, Okada loved to read, especially manga, and she was a talented artist. In junior high school, Okada wanted to become a singer and applied for every possible audition, anything from major productions to the smallest talent recruitment, hoping to become a star. She was rejected every time until she was finally accepted to a TV talent program, Star Tanjō! on Nippon Television – similar to Star Search, though the final stage was her singing to get interest from talent agents – singing Kitahara Sawako's "MY BOYFRIEND" for the audition, and Akina Nakamori's "Slow Motion" for the final round, which she won in March 1983.

== Career ==
Okada made her debut in 1984, when on April that year, she released her first single, "First Date", written by composer and singer Mariya Takeuchi. She was nicknamed "Yukko" (ユッコ) by her fans, which is a common abbreviation for the name "Yukiko" in the Japanese language. Her smile bore the same name: the "Yukko smile".

Okada won Rookie of the Year in the year of her debut,. and she was awarded the 26th Japan Record Awards Grand Prix Best New Artist Award for her third single, "-Dreaming Girl- Koi, Hajimemashite", also written by Takeuchi.

Okada played the leading role in her first television drama Kinjirareta Mariko (禁じられたマリコ, lit. "The Forbidden Mariko"), in 1985. Her 1986 single "Kuchibiru Network", written by singer Seiko Matsuda, and composed by Ryuichi Sakamoto, reached number one on the Oricon weekly singles chart dated February 10, 1986. (It was later covered by idol girl group Sunmyu as its debut song in 2013.)

== Death ==
The Sun Music Building, located in Yotsuya, Tokyo

On April 8, 1986, Okada was found with a slashed wrist in her gas-filled Tokyo apartment, crouching in a closet and crying. She was discovered by a rescue team called in by the apartment's manager after other residents noticed the smell of gas. Okada's manager eventually arrived and took her to nearby Kita Aoyama Hospital, where her injuries were treated.

In a 2014 article on the Asahi Weekly, Sun Music former managing director Tokio Fukuda recalled that Sun Music founder Hideyoshi Aizawa called him to pick up Okada from the hospital. When he met her, she was crying softly. He then asked her where she wanted to go: to her parents' home in Nagoya, her apartment, or the office. She replied that the office was good, so she was brought to the sixth floor of the Sun Music building. Aizawa then called Fukuda, leading him to step out.

While Fukuda, the management director and the staff were discussing how to avoid a media scandal, Okada ran to the stairs, went to the roof of the seven-story building, took off her shoes, and jumped, resulting in instant death. It was 12:15 PM JST.

The reason for the suicide is unclear. Okada was reported to have been "upset and depressed about an unhappy love affair", with an actor described to be "old enough to be her father", Tōru Minegishi, a co-star in Kinjirareta Mariko. Minegishi said that "he thought of her more as a younger sister". When asked if a relationship with Minegishi was the cause, Fukuda replied that he did not know or denied it, speculating that Okada's second suicide attempt was due to the shame that the first attempt would bring to Sun Music.

Okada's remains were cremated, and were interred at the Jōman-ji Temple, Aisai, Aichi Prefecture, Japan.

== Legacy ==
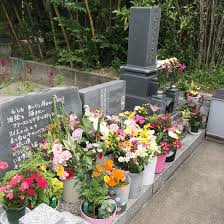
Yukiko Okada's grave at the Jōman-ji Temple. Her grave is always covered with flowers.

Fans who expected her to be Seiko Matsuda's successor were shocked and shattered by her untimely death. It resulted in many copycat suicides in Japan, soon christened with the neologism "Yukiko Syndrome" or "Yukko Syndrome." By April 26, 1986, 23 out of 36 youth suicides since Okada died were committed by also jumping off a building.

In turn, it has been suggested that Okada may have had in mind idol Yasuko Endō, who also committed suicide by falling from a rooftop ten days earlier.

A ninth single, scheduled for release on May 14, 1986, was postponed on fears of more suicides. The single, "花のイマージュ" (Hana no Image), was eventually released in March 1999 included in "Memorial Album".

Mariya Takeuchi covered three of the songs she wrote for Okada on her fortieth anniversary album Turntable. A compilation album of all eleven songs Takeuchi wrote for Okada, Yukiko Okada Mariya's Songbook, was released in 2019, and debuted at no. 13 on the Oricon Weekly Album Chart on October 28, 2019.

In the July 30, 2017 edition of the Chunichi Sport, it was mentioned that on July 29, 2017, a fan meeting was held at the 9th floor of the Tokai Radio Headquarters in Nagoya to celebrate what would have been the 50th birthday of Yukiko Okada in August 2017. Entitled "Sing again! Yukko!", this was organized by 'Dotore Yamaguchi's Dokidoki Radio', '84/ Dr. Sato Yamaguchi in cooperation with Tokai Radio Magazine House, Pony Canyon, and Sun Music. It was a time to remember the life of Yukiko Okada through pictures presentation and songs and displayed other memorabilia.

== Discography ==
During her life, Okada released 4 original albums, 3 compilation albums, 10 physical singles and 2 home-video releases.

- Note: All releases after April 1986 are posthumous.

=== Singles ===
List of singles, with selected chart positions
Year	Single	Peak chart positions	Formats
Year	Single	JPN Oricon	Formats
1984	"First Date"	20	CD, LP, Cassette, digital download, streaming
1984	"Little Princess"	14	CD, LP, Cassette, digital download, streaming
1984	"Dreaming Girl-Koi, Hajimemashite"	7	CD, LP, Cassette, digital download, streaming
1985	"Futari Dake no Ceremony"	4	CD, LP, Cassette, digital download, streaming
1985	"Summer Beach"*	5	CD, LP, Cassette, digital download, streaming
1985	"Kanashii Yokan"	7	CD, LP, Cassette, digital download, streaming
1985	"Love Fair"	5	CD, LP, Cassette, digital download, streaming
1986	"Kuchibiru Network"	1	CD, LP, Cassette, digital download, streaming
1986	"Hana no Image"	-	digital download, streaming
2002	"Believe in You: Strings version"	63	CD, digital download, streaming

Summer beach was re-released on April 19, 2024 with a new album cover available by streaming and on LP*

=== Albums ===
List of albums, with selected chart positions
Title	Album details	Peak positions
Title	Album details	JPN Oricon
Cinderella	Released: September 5, 1984; Label: Pony Canyon; Formats: CD, LP, Cassette tape, digital download, streaming	7
Fairy	Released: March 21, 1985; Label: Pony Canyon; Formats: CD, LP, Cassette tape, digital download, streaming	2
Jyūgatsu no Ningyo	Released: September 18, 1985; Label: Pony Canyon; Formats: CD, LP, Cassette tape, digital download, streaming	4
Venus Tanjō	Released: March 21, 1986; Label: Pony Canyon; Formats: CD, LP, Cassette tape, digital download, streaming	5

=== Compilation albums ===
List of albums, with selected chart positions
Title	Album details	Peak positions
Title	Album details	JPN Oricon
Okurimono	Released: November 28, 1984; Label: Pony Canyon; Formats: LP, Cassette tape, digital download, streaming	6
Okurimono II	Released: December 5, 1985; Label: Pony Canyon; Formats: CD, LP, Cassette tape, digital download, streaming	17
All Songs Request	Released: May 15, 2002; Label: Pony Canyon; Formats: CD, digital download, streaming	47
The Premium Best Okada Yukiko	Released: November 21, 2012; Label: Pony Canyon; Formats: CD, digital download, streaming	139
Golden☆Idol Okada Yukiko	Released: July 30, 2014; Label: Pony Canyon; Formats: CD, digital download, streaming	79
Present	Released: September 16, 2015; Label: Pony Canyon; Formats: CD, digital download, streaming	135
Yukiko Okada Mariya's Songbook	Released: October 16, 2019; Label: Pony Canyon; Formats: CD, LP, digital download, streaming	13

Notes:

- Golden☆Idol (ゴールデン☆アイドル) (Compilation album of all her eight released singles and b-sides plus her unreleased ninth single and b-sid.e) (2014)
- Present (プレゼント) (Compilation album of non-album tracks except for b-sides of singles from previously existing albums. Released as part of her Hi-Res album reissue campaign.) (2015)
- Yukiko Okada Mariya's Songbook (posthumous compilation album of songs sung by Yukiko Okada written and composed by Mariya Takeuchi) (CD released October 16, 2019, Analog LP released April 20, 2020)

=== Box set ===
List of albums, with selected chart positions
Title	Album details	Peak positions
Title	Album details	JPN Oricon
Memorial Box	Released: March 17, 1999; Label: Pony Canyon; Formats: CD, digital download, streaming	30
Okurimono III	Released: December 18, 2002; Label: Pony Canyon; Formats: CD, CD+DVD, digital download, streaming	87
7 Inch Single Complete Box	Released: 2024; Label: Pony Canyon; Formats: LP	TBA
GIFT/1984-1986 LIVE TOUR BOX	Released: December 25, 2024; Label: Pony Canyon; Formats: CD	TBA

Notes:

- Memorial Box (メモリアルBOX) (First compilation and box set to be released since her death. Includes her two Okurimino compilations, her final album "Venus Tanjou", and the previously unreleased single, "Hana no Image" coupled with "Himitsu no Symphony".) (1999)
- Okurimono III (贈りものIII, Gift III) (Box set containing all her four albums plus non-album singles, DVD including promo videos, and other previously unreleased material.) (2002)
- 7 Inch Single Complete (Box set containing all her 8 singles along with posthumous single "Hana no Image" being released as an inch single for the first time ever)
- GIFT/1984-1986 LIVE TOUR BOX (Box set containing audio recordings of all four of her concert tours.)

=== Home-video release ===
List of albums, with selected chart positions
Title	Album details	Peak positions
Title	Album details	JPN Oricon
Yukiko in Swiss	Released: February 20, 1985; Label: Pony Canyon; Formats: VHS, LD	-
Memories of Switzerland	Released: February 20, 1985; Label: Pony Canyon; Formats: VHS, LD, DVD	-

Preceded by The Good-Bye	Japan Record Award for Best New Artist; 1984	Succeeded by Miho Nakayama
Preceded by The Good-Bye	FNS Music Festival for Best New Artist; 1984	Succeeded by Minako Honda
Preceded by The Good-Bye, Sayuri Iwai, Yasuko Kuwata	Shinjuku Music Festival for Gold Prize; 1984 (with : Koji Kikkawa)	Succeeded by Shigeyuki Nakamura, Minako Honda
Preceded by The Good-Bye	Ginza Music Festival for Grand Prix; 1984	Succeeded by Noriko Matsumoto
