= Forever Love (Cute song) =

- Regular Edition cover

Single by Cute

from the album 4 Akogare My Star
- Released: November 26, 2008 (CD); December 10, 2008 (Single V)
- Recorded: 2008
- Genre: J-pop
- Length: 12:33
- Label: Zetima
- Songwriter: Tsunku
- Producer: Tsunku

Cute singles chronology
"Edo no Temari Uta II" (2008)	"Forever Love" (2008)	"Bye Bye Bye!" (2009)

Music video
- "Forever Love" on YouTube

"Forever Love" is the 7th major (and 11th overall) single by Hello! Project idol group Cute. It was released on November 26, 2008 in two editions—a normal edition (EPCE-5588), and a limited edition with a bonus DVD (EPCE-5586 - 7) and an alternative cover. The first press of each edition contained a card with a serial number, which was used in a Japan-exclusive event draw. The Single V (EPBE-5311) was released on December 10, 2008. The single debuted at number 5 in the weekly Oricon charts, remaining in the charts for 3 weeks. This was the last single to feature Kanna Arihara.

== Track listings ==
All tracks are written by Tsunku.

No.	Title	Length
1.	"Forever Love" (FOREVER LOVE)
2.	"Seventeen's Vow" (セブンティーンズVOW)
3.	"Forever Love (Instrumental)" (FOREVER LOVE（Instrumental）)

Limited Edition DVD
No.	Title	Length
1.	"Jacket photos making-of" (ジャケット撮影メイキング)

=== Single V ===
1. Forever Love
2. Forever Love (Casual Dance Ver.)

== Charts ==
Chart (2008)	Peak position
Oricon Weekly Singles Chart	5
Billboard Japan Hot 100	22
Billboard Japan Hot Singles Sales	7
