= Challenge Concert =

Live album by Pink Lady
- Released: June 5, 1977
- Recorded: March 31, 1977
- Venue: Tokyo Yūbin Chokin Kaikan
- Genres: J-pop; kayōkyoku; disco; teen pop
- Length: 74:39
- Languages: Japanese; English
- Label: Victor
- Producer: Hisahiko Iida

Pink Lady chronology
Pepper Keibu (1976)	Challenge Concert (1977)	Summer Fire '77 (1977)

Challenge Concert (チャレンジ・コンサート, Charenji Konsāto) is the first live album by Japanese idol duo Pink Lady, released through Victor Entertainment on June 5, 1977. It was recorded live at the duo's debut concert at Tokyo Yūbin Chokin Kaikan on March 31, 1977.

The album became the duo's first No. 1 on Oricon's weekly albums chart, selling over 160,000 copies.

== Track listing ==
CD
No.	Title	Writer(s)	Length
1.	"Opening ~ Keep On Dancing" (Ōpuningu ~ Asa Made Odorō (オープニング ～朝まで踊ろう; "Opening ~ Let's Dance in the Morning"))	Allen A. Jones; Andrew Love; Richard Shann	5:25
2.	"Medley I (メドレー I, Medorē Wan): "Money Honey" (マネー・ハニー, Manē Hanī); "Angel Baby" (エンジェル・ベイビー, Enjeru Beibī); "Rock and Roll Love Letter" (ロックン・ロール・ラブレター, Rokkun Rōru Raburetā); "I Only Want to Be with You" (二人だけのデート, Furari Dake no Dēto; "Date for Two")"	Eric Faulkner; Stuart Wood; Tim Moore; Mike Hawker; Ivor Raymonde	7:22
3.	"Pepper Keibu" (Peppā Keibu (ペッパー警部; "Inspector Pepper"))	Yū Aku; Shunichi Tokura	3:19
4.	"Rock and Roller Coaster" (Rokkun Rōrā Kōsutā (ロックン・ローラー・コースター))	David Bartlett; Emilio Castillo; Stephen Kupka	2:52
5.	"Nigai Namida" ((にがい涙; "Bitter Tears"))	Kazumi Yasui; Kyōhei Tsutsumi	4:52
6.	"Jolene" (Jorīn (ジョリーン))	Dolly Parton	2:53
7.	"Things" (Hatsukoi no Namikimichi (初恋の並木道))	Bobby Darin	2:14
8.	"Feelings" (Fīringu (フィーリング))	Morris Albert; Louis Gasté	2:53
9.	"Take Me Home, Country Roads" (Kantorī Rōdo (カントリー・ロード))	Bill Danoff; Taffy Nivert; John Denver	3:34
10.	"Sir Duke" (Aisuru Deyūku (愛するデューク))	Stevie Wonder	5:58
11.	"Motown Story (モータウン・ストーリー, Mōtaun Sutōrī): "Motown Overture" (モータウン・オーバチュア, Mōtaun Ōbachua); "Money (That's What I Want)" (マネー, Manē); "Please Mr. Postman" (プリーズ・ミスター・ポストマン, Purīzu Misutā Posutoman); "I Want You Back" (アイ・ウォント・ユー・バック, Ai Uonto Yū Bakku); "You Keep Me Hangin' On" (ユー・キープ・ミー・ハンギン・オン, Yū Kīpu Mī Hangin On)"	Berry Gordy; Janie Bradford; Georgia Dobbins; William Garrett; Freddie Gorman; Brian Holland; Robert Bateman; The Corporation; Holland–Dozier–Holland	4:59
12.	"Kanpai Ojōsan" ((乾杯お嬢さん; "Cheers, Miss"))	Aku; Tokura	3:18
13.	"Yūutsubi (Mie solo)" ((ゆううつ日; "Day of Depression"))	Aku; Tokura	3:53
14.	"Inspiration (Kei solo)" (Insupirēshon (インスピレーション))	Aku; Tokura	2:57
15.	"Medley II (メドレーII, Medorē Tsū): "Stop! In the Name of Love" (ストップ・イン・ザ・ネーム・オブ・ラブ, Sutoppu In za Nēmu obu Rabu); "Sexy Bus Stop" (セクシー・バス・ストップ, Sekushī Basu Sutoppu); "Baby Love" (ベイビー・ラブ, Beibī Rabu); "Soul Korekkiri Desu ka (ソウルこれっきりですか, Souru Korekkiri Desu ka; "Is This All About Soul?"); "Koi no Hustle Jet" (恋のハッスル・ジェット, Koi no Hassuru Jetto; "Love Hustle Jet"); "Where Did Our Love Go" (愛はどこへ行った, Ai wa Doko e Itta)"	Holland–Dozier–Holland; Jack Diamond; Hiroshi Takada	4:39
16.	"S.O.S."	Aku; Tokura	2:41
17.	"Carmen '77" (Karumen Nanajū-nana (カルメン '77))	Aku; Tokura	4:47
18.	"Bye, Bye, Baby (Baby Goodbye)" (Bai Bai Beibī ~Sayonara no Uta~ (バイ・バイ・ベイビー ～サヨナラの歌～))	Bob Crewe; Bob Gaudio	4:34
Total length:			74:39

== Personnel ==
- Mie & Kei - vocals
- Jiro Inagaki and Soul Media with Strings

- Jiro Inagaki - tenor saxophone
- Tadayuki Harada - baritone saxophone
- Takaki Yoshioka - trumpet
- Takehisa Suzuki - trumpet
- Kazuo Usui - trombone
- Akira Inoue - keyboards
- Shōgo Kindaichi - bass
- Yasuhiko Tsumura - guitar
- Haruo Sōya - drums
- Mintz & Margaret - backing vocals
- Norio Maeda - arrangement

== Chart positions ==
Chart (1977)	Peak position
Japanese Oricon Albums Chart	1

== See also ==
- 1977 in Japanese music
