= Shocking 5 =

- Regular Edition cover

Studio album by Cute
- Released: February 24, 2010 (JP)
- Recorded: 2009
- Genre: J-pop
- Label: Zetima
- Producer: Tsunku

Cute chronology
Cute Nan Desu! Zen Single Atsumechaimashita! 1 (2009)	Shocking 5 (2010)	Chō Wonderful! 6 (2011)

Singles from Shocking 5
- 1. "Bye Bye Bye!" Released: April 15, 2009; 2. "Shochū Omimai Mōshiagemasu" Released: July 1, 2009; 3. "Everyday Zekkōchō!!" Released: September 16, 2009; 4. "Shock!" Released: January 6, 2010

Shocking 5 (ショッキング5, Shokkingu Faibu) is Cute's 5th studio album. It was released on February 24, 2010 in two editions—a normal, CD-only edition (EPCE-5696), and a limited edition with an alternative cover, which came with a bonus DVD (EPCE-5694-5). Both editions contained a special photo-card.

The album debuted at number 25 in the Oricon Weekly Albums Chart, remaining in the chart for 2 weeks.

== Track listings ==
=== CD ===
1. "Everyday Zekkōchō!!" (ＥＶＥＲＹＤＡＹ 絶好調！！, In Perfect Form, Everyday!!)
2. "The Party!"
3. "Aa Koi" (嗚呼 恋, Ah, Love!)
  - Sung by Airi Suzuki.
4. "Bye Bye Bye!"
5. "Lonely girl's night"
  - Sung by Maimi Yajima.
6. "Kimi no Senpō" (君の戦法, Your Strategy)
  - Sung by Saki Nakajima, Chisato Okai and Mai Hagiwara.
7. "Shock!"
8. "Shigatsu Sengen" (四月宣言, April Announcement)
9. "Zansho Omimai Mōshiagemasu." (「残暑 お見舞い 申し上げます。」, Late Summer Greetings)
10. "Yume ga Aru Kara" (夢があるから, 'Cause We Have Dreams)
11. "Shochū Omimai Mōshiagemasu (H22 Remix)" (暑中お見舞い申し上げます(H22 Remix), Midsummer Greetings (H22 Remix))

=== DVD ===
1. Shigatsu Sengen PV (四月宣言PV)
2. Jacket & PV Shooting - Making of (ジャケット&PV撮影メイキング)
3. Off-shot slideshow (オフショットスライドショー)

== Charts ==
Chart (2010)	Peak position	Weeks on chart	Sales	
Chart (2010)	Peak position	Weeks on chart	First week	Total
Japan (Oricon Weekly Albums Chart)	25	2	6,475	7,345
