= Mizue Takada =

Japanese female singer and idol (born 1960)

- Born: Takada Mizue (高田みづえ); June 23, 1960 (age 66); Minamikyūshū, Kagoshima, Japan
- Genres: Kayokyoku
- Occupations: TV personality; singer; idol
- Years active: 1977–1985

Mizue Takada (高田 みづえ Takada Mizue, born June 23, 1960) is a former Japanese female singer and idol.

== Biography ==
She debuted on March 25, 1977, with the single Garasu Zaka (The Slopes Of Glass) which became an Oricon top 10 hit. Between 1977 and 1985 she released 26 singles. All of these charted on the Oricon top 100 chart list and 17 reached the top 40. Her music was an unusual blend between Kayōkyoku and Enka.

At the 1977 Japan Record Awards, the FNS Music Festival, the Tokyo Music Festival, the Nippon Television Music Festival, the Ginza Music Festival, the Shinjuku Music Festival and at the Japan Cable Awards, Takada all won the Best Newcomer award.

Takada was promoted alongside Idols Ikue Sakakibara and Yukiko Shimizu, who also debuted in 1977. They were dubbed the "Fresh San'nin Musume" (three fresh girls). Before them Junko Sakurada, Momoe Yamaguchi and Masako Mori were promoted in the same fashion.

She performed for a total of 7 times at the Kōhaku Uta Gassen festival between 1977 and 1984.

Mizue Takada retired from show business in 1985 after marriage to Wakashimazu Mutsuo, and is the okamisan at Nishonoseki stable.

On August 8, 2015, she sang at the NHK "Omoide no Melody" music show, her first public performance in 30 years.

== Discography ==
=== Singles ===
List of singles, with selected chart positions
Year	Single	Peak chart positions	Formats
Year	Single	JPN Physical	Formats
1977	"Garasu Zaka (硝子坂; The Slopes Of Glass)": Nominated for Best Newcomer at the 19th Japan Record Awards. Performed at the 28th edition of Kōhaku Uta Gassen	9	CD, LP, Cassette
1977	"Dakedo... (だけど…; But...)"	6	CD, LP, Cassette
1977	"Vidro Kozaiku (ビードロ恋細工; Love Crafted Vidro)"	9	CD, LP, Cassette
1978	"Hana Shigure (花しぐれ; Flower Drizzle)": Performed at the 29th edition of Kōhaku Uta Gassen	10	CD, LP, Cassette
1978	"Purple Shadow"	16	CD, LP, Cassette
1978	"Onna Tomodachi (女ともだち; Girlfriend)"	19	CD, LP, Cassette
1979	"Shiosai No Melody (潮騒のメロディー; Melody Of The Sea)"	25	CD, LP, Cassette
1980	"Watashi Wa Piano (私はピアノ; I Am A Piano)": Performed at the 31st edition of Kōhaku Uta Gassen	5	CD, LP, Cassette
1981	"Ai No Imagination (愛のイマジネーション; Imagination Of Love)"	19	CD, LP, Cassette
1981	"Namida No Jitterbug (涙のジルバ; Jitterbug Of Tears)": Performed at the 32nd edition of Kōhaku Uta Gassen	22	CD, LP, Cassette
1981	"Yume Densetsu Persian Blue (夢伝説ᐸペルシャン・ブルーᐳ; Legendary Dreams Of <Persian Blue>)"	28	CD, LP, Cassette
1982	"Ai No Owari Ni (愛の終りに; At The End Of I Love You)"	28	CD, LP, Cassette
1982	"Garasu No Hana (ガラスの花; The Flowers Of Glass)": Performed at the 33rd edition of Kōhaku Uta Gassen	34	CD, LP, Cassette
1983	"Torisugita Kaze (通りすぎた風; The Wind Passes Through)"	28	CD, LP, Cassette
1983	"Sonna Hiroshi Ni Damaserete (そんなヒロシに騙されて; I've Been Cheated On By Hiroshi)": Performed at the 34th edition of Kōhaku Uta Gassen	6	CD, LP, Cassette
1984	"Akifuyu (秋冬; The Fall)"	22	CD, LP, Cassette
1984	"Harajuku Memory"	35	CD, LP, Cassette

=== Albums ===
List of albums, with selected chart positions
Title	Album details	Peak positions
Title	Album details	JPN Oricon
Original First	Released: August 25, 1977; Label: Teichiku Records; Formats: CD, LP, Cassette tape, digital download, streaming	-
Video Zaiku	Released: December 20, 1977; Label: Teichiku Records; Formats: CD, LP, Cassette tape, digital download, streaming	-
Dream on Dream	Released: February 25, 1978; Label: Teichiku Records; Formats: CD, LP, Cassette tape, digital download, streaming	-
Furimukeba Aki	Released: September 25, 1979; Label: Teichiku Records; Formats: CD, LP, Cassette tape, digital download, streaming	-
Imagination	Released: October 25, 1980; Label: Teichiku Records; Formats: CD, LP, Cassette tape, digital download, streaming	-
Koibitotachi	Released: July 25, 1981; Label: Teichiku Records; Formats: CD, LP, Cassette tape, digital download, streaming	-
Prism	Released: March 25, 1982; Label: Teichiku Records; Formats: CD, LP, Cassette tape, digital download, streaming	-
Glass no Hana/Natsu no Owari ni	Released: October 21, 1982; Label: Teichiku Records; Formats: CD, LP, Cassette tape, digital download, streaming	-
Ai wo Atatamete	Released: November 21, 1984; Label: Teichiku Records; Formats: CD, LP, Cassette tape, digital download, streaming	-
Ai no Monologue	Released: May 5, 1985; Label: Teichiku Records; Formats: CD, LP, Cassette tape, digital download, streaming	-

=== Cover albums ===
List of cover albums, with selected chart positions
Title	Album details	Peak positions
Title	Album details	JPN Oricon
Ano Hi ni Kaeritai	Released: September 21, 1983; Label: Teichiku Records; Formats: CD, LP, Cassette tape, digital download, streaming	-
Seishun no Uta wo Utau (青春の詩を唄う)	Released: November 20, 2013; Label: Teichiku Records; Formats: CD	-

=== Live albums ===
List of live albums, with selected chart positions
Title	Album details	Peak positions
Title	Album details	JPN Oricon
First Concert	Released: May 25, 1978; Label: Teichiku Records; Formats: LP	-
Final Concert	Released: June 1, 1985; Label: Teichiku Records; Formats: CD, LP	-

=== Compilation albums ===
List of live albums, with selected chart positions
Title	Album details	Peak positions
Title	Album details	JPN Oricon
Mizue no Heya (みづえの部屋)	Released: September 25, 1978; Label: Teichiku Records; Formats: LP	-
Shiosai no Melody/Original Best 12 (潮騒のメロディー／オリジナル･ベスト12)	Released: May 25, 1980; Label: Teichiku Records; Formats: LP	-
Yume Densetsu: Persian Blue (夢伝説〜ペルシャン・ブルー)	Released: November 25, 1981; Label: Teichiku Records; Formats: LP	-
Super Hit 12/Junai Sagashi (スーパー・ヒット12／純愛さがし)	Released: June 21, 1983; Label: Teichiku Records; Formats: LP	-
Sonna Hiroshi ni Damasarete: Private Collection (そんなヒロシに騙されて〜プライベート・コレクション)	Released: October 21, 1983; Label: Teichiku Records; Formats: LP	-
Akifuyu: Kisetsu Meguri (秋冬〜季節めぐり)	Released: April 21, 1984; Label: Teichiku Records; Formats: LP	-
My Memory (マイ・メモリー)	Released: May 5, 1985; Label: Teichiku Records; Formats: LP, CD	-
Zenkyokushuu (全曲集)	Released: October 21, 1986; Label: Teichiku Records; Formats: CD	-
Best Collection (ベスト・コレクション)	Released: August 21, 1988; Label: Teichiku Records; Formats: CD	-
Best Collection II (ベスト・コレクション II)	Released: June 22, 1994; Label: Teichiku Records; Formats: CD	-
Memoria Best (メモリアル・ベスト) released only for FC members	Released: 1999; Label: Teichiku Records; Formats: CD	-
Super Selection Vol.1 Super Selection Vol.2 (スーパー・セレクション)	Released: June 21, 1999; Label: Teichiku Records; Formats: CD	-
Single Best 30 (シングル・ベスト30)	Released: March 26, 2003; Label: Teichiku Records; Formats: CD	-
Tenban Best (定番ベスト)	Released: September 1, 2004; Label: Teichiku Records; Formats: CD	-
Complete Singles (コンプリート・シングルズ)	Released: October 26, 2005; Label: Teichiku Records; Formats: 3CD	-
Tenban Best Single Watashi wa Piano/Glass Zaka Sonna Hiroshi ni Damasarete/Shiosai no Melody (定番BEST SINGLE 私はピアノ／硝子坂/そんなヒロシに騙されて／潮騒のメロディー)	Released: December 7, 2005; Label: Teichiku Records; Formats: CD, Cassette tape	-
Complete Singles & More (コンプリート･シングルズ&モア)	Released: August 27, 2008; Label: Teichiku Records; Formats: 3CD, Cassette tape	-
Teichiku Million Series (テイチク ミリオンシリーズ)	Released: September 23, 2009; Label: Teichiku Records; Formats: CD	-
Best☆BEST	Released: December 21, 2010; Label: Teichiku Records; Formats: CD	-

=== Box sets ===
List of box sets, with selected chart positions
Title	Album details	Peak positions
Title	Album details	JPN Oricon
Takada Mizue Zenshuu (高田みづえ全集)	Released: February 10, 1998 August 1, 2008; Label: Teichiku Records; Formats: 6 CDs	-

== See also ==
- Kayōkyoku
- Enka
- Japanese idol
- List of Japanese idols
