= Wana (song) =

Single by Candies

from the album Candies Final Carnival Plus One
- Language: Japanese
- English title: Trap
- B-side: "100% Pure Lady"
- Released: December 5, 1977
- Recorded: 1977
- Genre: kayōkyoku; teen pop
- Length: 3:19
- Label: CBS Sony
- Composer: Yūsuke Hoguchi
- Lyricist: Takemi Shima
- Producers: Sumio Matsuzaki; Masatoshi Sakai

Candies singles chronology
"Un, Deux, Trois" (1977)	"Wana" (1977)	"Hohoemi Gaeshi" (1978)

"Wana" (わな; "Trap") is the 17th single by Japanese music trio Candies. Written by Takemi Shima and Yūsuke Hoguchi, the single was released on March 1, 1977. This was the first single to feature Miki Fujimura on lead vocals.

The song peaked at No. 3 on Oricon's singles chart and spent 23 weeks in that chart. It sold over 392,000 copies.

== Track listing ==
All lyrics are written by Takemi Shima; all music is composed and arranged by Yūsuke Hoguchi.

No.	Title	Length
1.	"Wana" ((わな; "Trap"))	3:19
2.	"100% Pure Lady" (Hyaku Pāsento Pyua Redi (100%ピュア・レディ))	3:02

== Chart positions ==
Charts (1977)	Peak position
Japanese Oricon Singles Chart	3

== See also ==
- 1977 in Japanese music
