= Shochū Omimai Mōshiagemasu =

1977 single by Candies

Single by Candies

from the album Candy Label
- Language: Japanese
- English title: Midsummer Greetings
- B-side: "Orange no Umi"
- Released: July 21, 1977
- Recorded: 1977
- Genre: kayōkyoku; teen pop
- Length: 2:58
- Label: CBS Sony
- Composer: Juichi Sase
- Lyricist: Makoto Kitajō
- Producers: Sumio Matsuzaki; Masatoshi Sakai

Candies singles chronology
"Yasashii Akuma" (1977)	"Shochū Omimai Mōshiagemasu" (1977)	"Un, Deux, Trois" (1977)

"Shochū Omimai Mōshiagemasu" (暑中お見舞い申し上げます, "Midsummer Greetings") is the 15th single by Japanese music trio Candies. Written by Makoto Kitajō and Juichi Sase, the single was released on July 21, 1977. The song appeared on their 1977 album Candy Label.

The song ranked fifth on Oricon's singles chart and spent 16 weeks in that chart. It sold over 298,000 copies.

== Track listing ==
All lyrics are written by Makoto Kitajō.

No.	Title	Music	Arrangement	Length
1.	"Shochū Omimai Mōshiagemasu" ((暑中お見舞い申し上げます; "Midsummer Greetings"))	Juichi Sase	Kōji Makaino	2:58
2.	"Orange no Umi" (Orenji no Umi (オレンジの海; "The Orange Sea"))	Yūsuke Hoguchi	Hoguchi	3:22

== Chart positions ==
Chart (1977)	Peak position
Japanese Oricon Singles Chart	5

== Cute version ==
"Shochū Omimai Mōshiagemasu"
- Regular Edition cover

Single by Cute

from the album Shocking 5
- Language: Japanese
- English title: Midsummer Greetings
- B-side: "Zansho Omimai Mōshiagemasu."
- Released: July 1, 2009
- Genre: J-pop
- Label: zetima
- Composer: Juichi Sase
- Lyricist: Makoto Kitajō

Cute singles chronology
"Bye Bye Bye!" (2009)	"Shochū Omimai Mōshiagemasu" (2009)	"Everyday Zekkōchō!!" (2009)

Music video
- "Shochū Omimai Mōshiagemasu" on YouTube

Hello! Project girl group Cute released their version of "Shochū Omimai Mōshiagemasu" as their ninth single on July 1, 2009. It was released in a normal CD-only edition, and a limited edition with a bonus DVD. The song was used as the Japan Post Service Company's "Summer Greetings 2009" image song.

The single ranked fifth in the Oricon Weekly Singles Chart.

=== Track listing ===
No.	Title	Lyrics	Music	Arrangement	Length
1.	"Shochū Omimai Mōshiagemasu" ((暑中お見舞い申し上げます; "Midsummer Greetings"))	Makoto Kitajō	Juichi Sase	Shōichirō Hirata
2.	"Zansho Omimai Mōshiagemasu." ((残暑 お見舞い 申し上げます。; "Late Summer Greetings."))	Tsunku	Hatake (of Sharam Q)	Yūsuke Itagaki
3.	"Shochū Omimai Mōshiagemasu (Instrumental)" ((暑中お見舞い申し上げます; "Midsummer Greetings"))	Kitajō	Sase	Hirata

=== Charts ===
Chart (2009)	Peak position
Oricon Weekly Singles Chart	5
Billboard Japan Hot 100	20
Billboard Japan Hot Singles Sales	5
Billboard Japan Adult Contemporary Airplay	51

== Other cover versions ==
- Japanese girl group Sweets also released a cover of this song in 2004.

== See also ==
- 1977 in Japanese music
