= Candies 1½: Yasashii Akuma =

Studio album by Candies
- Released: April 21, 1977
- Recorded: 1976
- Genres: kayōkyoku; teen pop
- Length: 58:38
- Languages: Japanese; English
- Label: CBS Sony
- Producers: Sumio Matsuzaki; Masatoshi Sakai

Candies chronology
Kuramae Kokugikan Carnival for 10,000 People Vol. 2: Candies Live (1976)	Candies 1½: Yasashii Akuma (1977)	Ketteiban Candies (1977)

Singles from Candies 1½: Yasashii Akuma
- 1. "Aishū no Symphony" Released: November 21, 1976; 2. "Yasashii Akuma" Released: March 1, 1977

Candies 1½: Yasashii Akuma (キャンディーズ 1 1/2〜やさしい悪魔〜, Kyandīzu Ichi to Nibun no Ichi: Yasashii Akuma; lit. Candies 1½: Sweet Little Devil) is the eighth studio album by Japanese idol trio Candies, released through CBS Sony on April 21, 1977. It contains the singles "Aishū no Symphony" and "Yasashii Akuma". Side B features covers of popular western songs while Side C consists of songs written individually by the trio. The album is the trio's first dual LP release; hence the "1½" on the album title. The blank side of the second disc is etched with the trio's signatures.

== Charts ==
This album reached number 8 on the Japanese LPs chart published in Cash Box.

== Track listing ==
All music is arranged by Kōji Makaino, except where indicated.

Side A
No.	Title	Lyrics	Music	Arrangement	Length
1.	"Yasashii Akuma" ((やさしい悪魔; "Sweet Little Devil"))	Makoto Kitajō	Takuro Yoshida		3:39
2.	"20-sai no Koro" (Nijū-sai no Koro (20才の頃; "When I was 20"))	Machiko Ryū	Mitsuo Miyamoto	Motoki Funayama	2:53
3.	"Aishū no Symphony" (Aishū no Shinfonī (哀愁のシンフォニー; "Symphony of Sorrow"))	Rei Nakanishi	Takashi Miki		3:45
4.	"Sakamichi no Aru Fūkei" ((坂道のある風景; "A Landscape With a Slope"))	Ryū	Yūsuke Hoguchi	Hoguchi	3:09
5.	"Pastel Color no Suiyōbi" (Pasuteru Karā no Suiyōbi (パステルカラーの水曜日; "Wednesday in Pastel Colors"))	Ryū	Hoguchi	Hoguchi	3:38
6.	"Anata no Yesterday" (Anata no Iesutadei (あなたのイエスタデイ; "Your Yesterday"))	Kitajō	Yoshida		4:00

Side B
No.	Title	Writer(s)	Length
1.	"Here, There and Everywhere"	Lennon–McCartney	3:55
2.	"Breaking Up Is Hard to Do"	Howard Greenfield; Neil Sedaka	2:34
3.	"Jolene"	Dolly Parton	3:07
4.	"Love Is Blind"	Janis Ian	2:28
5.	"Take Me Home, Country Roads"	Bill Danoff; Taffy Nivert; John Denver	3:16
6.	"One Boy"	Charles Strouse; Lee Adams	2:38

Side C
No.	Title	Writer(s)	Length
1.	"Koi ga Hitotsu" ((恋がひとつ; "Love Is One"))	Ran Itō	2:48
2.	"Love Me Love Me"	Yoshiko Tanaka	3:01
3.	"Suteki na Mahōtsukai" ((素敵な魔法使い; "A Lovely Witch"))	Miki Fujimura	3:10
4.	"Midnight Highway" (Middonaito Haiuei (ミッドナイト・ハイウェイ))	Tanaka	3:09
5.	"Kyō kara Watashi wa" ((今日から私は; "From Now On, I..."))	Itō	2:35
6.	"Sayonara no Asa" ((さよならの朝; "Goodbye to the Morning"))	Fujimura	4:31

== See also ==
- 1977 in Japanese music
