= Goodbye My Love (Ann Lewis song) =

1974 song by Ann Lewis

Single by Ann Lewis

from the album Goodbye My Love
- Released: April 5, 1974
- Genre: Pop, Kayōkyoku, Ballad
- Length: 3:38
- Label: Victor
- Songwriters: Rei Nakanishi; Masaaki Hirao
- Producer: Masaaki Hirao

Ann Lewis singles chronology
"Wakarimasen" (1973)	"Goodbye My Love" (1974)	"Honeymoon in Hawaii" (1974)

"Goodbye My Love" (Japanese: グッド・バイ・マイ・ラブ) is a song originally recorded by Japanese singer Ann Lewis. It was released as her sixth Japanese single through Victor Entertainment on April 5, 1974. It served as a single for her studio album of the same name, which was released in July of the same year. The single included a B-side track titled "Kurakunaru Made Matte" and peaked at number 14 on the Oricon Singles Chart.

Numerous artists have released a cover of the song as an official single since its release, including by Teresa Teng in 1975, Kaori Sakagami in 1989, Shigeru Matsuzaki in 1993, and Saki Fukuda in 2006.

== Track listing ==
CD single

No.	Title	Length
1.	"Goodbye My Love (グッド・バイ・マイ・ラブ)"	3:38
2.	"Kurakunaru Made Matte (暗くなるまで待って; Wait Until it Gets Dark)"	3:10
Total length:		6:48

== Charts ==
=== Weekly charts ===
Chart (1974)	Peak position
Japan Singles (Oricon)	14

=== Year-end charts ===
Chart (1974)	Position
Japan Singles (Oricon)	50

== Teresa Teng version ==
"Goodbye My Love"

Single by Teresa Teng

from the album Love Songs of the Island: Goodbye My Love
- Language: Mandarin; Japanese
- Released: September 10, 1975
- Recorded: 1974
- Genre: Pop
- Length: 3:38
- Label: Polydor
- Songwriters: Luo Baowen; Rei Nakanishi
- Producers: Feng Tianzhi; Masaaki Hirao; Kenichiro Morioka

"Goodbye My Love" was recorded by Taiwanese singer Teresa Teng in both Japanese and Mandarin. The Japanese version was originally included on her debut Japanese studio album Kuko / Yukigesho, released through Polygram Records on October 21, 1974. Teng then re-recorded it in Mandarin (Chinese: 再見，我的愛人) and released it as a single in support of her studio album Love Songs of the Island: Goodbye My Love in September 1975. The Mandarin rendition is regarded as one of Teng's most well-known classics in the Chinese-speaking world.

=== Background and release ===
In 1974, Teng recorded a cover of Ann Lewis's "Goodbye My Love" for debut Japanese album titled Kuko / Yukigesho. It was released as her first record under the label on October 21, 1974, and was met with commercial success in Japan. "Konyakashira Ashitakashira", "Airport", and "Yukigesho" were released as CD singles for the album.

Teng released a Mandarin version of "Goodbye My Love" (再見，我的愛人; pinyin: Zàijiàn, wǒ de àirén) as a single for her studio album titled Love Songs of the Island: Goodbye My Love, which was released on September 10, 1975. The lyrics portray the helplessness and sorrow of two separated lovers.

=== Reception ===
The song became one of Teng's most famous songs and was sung as the finale number several times at her concerts throughout her career. South China Morning Post named it one of Teng's five best hits.

=== Credits and personnel ===
- Rei Nakanishi – Japanese lyricist
- Masaaki Hirao – composer
- Kenichiro Morioka – composer
- Feng Tianzhi – producer (Teresa Teng version)
- Luo Baowen – Mandarin lyricist
