= Ginza Music Festival =

- Awarded for: Outstanding achievements in the New artist
- Country: Japan
- Presented by: Nippon Broadcasting System
- First award: 1973
- Final award: 1990
- Website: http://www.1242.com/

The Ginza Music Festival (銀座音楽祭, Ginza Ongaku-sai) was an annual music awards on the produced by Nippon Broadcasting System.

== Grand Prix winners ==
- Akiko Kosaka (1974)
- Hiromi Ota (1975)
- Hiromi Iwasaki (1975)
- Machiko Watanabe (1978)
- Mariya Takeuchi (1979)
- Toshihiko Tahara (1980)
- Masahiko Kondo (1981)
- Shibugakitai (1982)
- The Good-Bye (1983)
- Yukiko Okada (1984)
- Noriko Matsumoto (1985)
- Shonentai (1986)
- Eriko Tamura (1989)
- Ninja (1990)

== Venues ==
- 1973-1975: Nakano Sun Plaza
- 1976-1981: Tokyo Takarazuka Theater
- 1982-1990: Grand Prince Hotel Akasaka
