= Kentaro Shimizu =

Japanese actor and singer

Kentarō Shimizu (清水 健太郎, Shimizu Kentarō; born October 11, 1952, in Kokura, Fukuoka, Japan) is a Japanese actor and singer.

Born Iwao Sonoda (園田 巌, Sonoda Iwao), he graduated from the Ashikaga Institute of Technology.

He has been arrested several times, and served prison terms, for various offences, among others illegal drug use.

== Discography (selection) ==
- 1991 First (Fāsuto)
- 1994 Amethyst / Shitsuren Restaurant (アメジスト / 失恋レストラン, Amejisuto / Shitsuren Resutoran)
- 2001 Shitsuren Restaurant (失恋レストラン, Shitsuren Resutoran)
- 2003 Oyaji / Umi ni Utaō (Oyaji / 海に唄おう Oyaji / Umi ni Utaō)

== Filmography (selection) ==
- Don eno Michi (首領への道)
- Gokudō Sangokushi (極道三国志)
- Janki (雀鬼)
- Shin Janki (真・雀鬼)
- Shin Nihon no Don (新・日本の首領)
- Truck Yaro: Otoko Ippiki Momojirō (1977) Kaoru Murase
- Tantei Monogatari (episode 20) (1980)
- Wangan Doro (1984)

Preceded by Yasuko Naitō	Japan Record Award for Best New Artist; 1977	Succeeded by Machiko Watanabe
