= Un, Deux, Trois (Candies song) =

Single by Candies

from the album Candies 1676 Days
- Language: Japanese
- English title: One, Two, Three
- B-side: "Futari no Love Song"
- Released: September 21, 1977
- Recorded: 1977
- Genre: kayōkyoku; teen pop
- Length: 7:44
- Label: CBS Sony
- Composer: Takuro Yoshida
- Lyricist: Makoto Kitajō
- Producers: Sumio Matsuzaki; Masatoshi Sakai

Candies singles chronology
"Shochū Omimai Mōshiagemasu" (1977)	"Un, Deux, Trois" (1977)	"Wana" (1977)

"Un, Deux, Trois" (アン・ドゥ・トロワ, An, Du, Torowa; lit. "One, Two, Three") is the 16th single by Japanese music trio Candies. Written by Makoto Kitajō and Takuro Yoshida, the single was released on September 21, 1977. The B-side, "Futari no Love Song", is a Japanese-language cover of The Carpenters' song "All You Get from Love Is a Love Song".

The song peaked at No. 7 on Oricon's singles chart and spent 18 weeks in that chart. It sold over 281,000 copies.

== Track listing ==
All music is arranged by Kōji Makaino.

No.	Title	Lyrics	Music	Length
1.	"Un, Deux, Trois" (An, Du, Torowa (アン・ドゥ・トロワ; "One, Two, Three"))	Makoto Kitajō	Takuro Yoshida
2.	"Futari no Love Song" (Futari no Ravu Songu (ふたりのラヴ・ソング))	Yukinojo Mori	Steve Eaton

== Chart positions ==
Chart (1977)	Peak position
Japanese Oricon Singles Chart	7

== Cover versions ==
- Takurō Yoshida self-covered the song in 1977, adding the line: "Sayonara Candies".
- Theresa Cheung did a Cantonese cover version in 1979, under the title of "Far Away".(Chinese: 情遙遠; Jyutping: Qíng yáoyuǎn)

== See also ==
- 1977 in Japanese music
