= Ann Lewis (musician) =

Japanese singer (born 1956)

- アン・ルイス
- Born: Ann Linda Lewis; June 5, 1956 (age 70); Kobe, Hyōgo Prefecture, Japan
- Occupations: Singer; musician; creative director; designer
- Years active: 1970–1999, 2003–2007
- Spouse: Masahiro Kuwana (m. 1980–1984)
- Children: 1
- Musical career
- Genres: J-pop; rock
- Instrument: Vocals
- Labels: Sony Music Entertainment Japan; Victor

Ann Lewis (アン・ルイス, An Ruisu; born June 5, 1956, in Kobe, Hyōgo Prefecture, Japan) is a Japanese musician who was popular in the 1970s and 1980s.

== Biography ==
Lewis was born to a half-Japanese mother and an American father. She also has one brother. Her many hits include the popular song "Roppongi Shinju", "Good Bye My Love" and many others which have been covered by other Asian artists. She semi-retired from show business in the 1990s after suffering from chronic panic attacks, and settled in Los Angeles. She released a few self covers albums in the 2000s. Lewis has been active as a creative director, consultant and designer. Her works include interior designs for private homes, business offices, restaurants and shops, releasing a line of original jewelry, creating original animation, logos and other projects. She has also been involved as the president, COO and marketing consultant for several software companies in the USA.

== Personal life ==
Lewis was married to Japanese singer Masahiro Kuwana from 1980 to 1984. They had a son together, Myuji, who was born in 1981. Her son is also a singer in Japan.

She currently lives in Los Angeles.

== Discography ==
=== Albums ===
- Ann Lewis Sings Ventures Hit (1972)
- Goodbye My Love (1974) Oricon Album Chart Position: 46
- Honeymoon In Hawaii (1974)
- Koi no Omokage (1975)
- Koi wo Utau (1976)
- Rock n Roll Baby (1977)
- Think! Pink! (1978) Oricon Album Chart Position: 17
- Pink Pussy Cat (1979) Oricon Album Chart Position: 49
- LINDA (1980) Oricon Album Chart Position: 22
- La Saison d'Amour (1982) Oricon Album Chart Position: 4
- Heavy Moon (1983) Oricon Album Chart Position: 24
- I Love You Yori Ashiteru (I Love You より愛してる) (1983) Oricon Album Chart Position: 26
- Dri Yume X-T-C (Dri夢・X-T-C) (1984)
- Romantic Violence (1984) Oricon Album Chart Position: 49
- Yujo (遊女) (1986) Oricon Album Chart Position: 3
- Joshin (1987) Oricon Album Chart Position: 5
- Meiki (女息) (1988) Oricon Album Chart Position: 8
- My Name Is Woman (1989) Oricon Album Chart Position: 7
- Rude (1990) Oricon Album Chart Position: 10
- K･Rock (1992) Oricon Album Chart Position: 7
- Rockadelic (1993) Oricon Album Chart Position: 15
- Piercer (1994) Oricon Album Chart Position:53
- La Adelita (1996) Oricon Album Chart Position: 91
- Fetish (1998)

=== Best of albums ===
- Annie's Specials Oricon Album Chart Position: 64
- Annie's Mix '85 (1985) Oricon Album Chart Position: 12
- 全曲集 (1985) Oricon Album Chart Position: 12
- Womanism I (1991) Oricon Album Chart Position: 10
- Womanism II (1991) Oricon Album Chart Position: 3
- Womanism III (1991) Oricon Album Chart Position: 8
- Annie's Rag Bag: Ann Lewis Box (1995) Oricon Album Chart Position: 92
- Womanism IV (1995) Oricon Album Chart Position: 25
- Womanism Outtakes (1995) (packaged with Womanism I-IV set)
- Womanism Best (2000)
- Ann Lewis Best Selection (2005)
- Womanism Complete Best (2006)
- Cheek I (2007)
- Cheek II (2007)
- Cheek III (2007)

=== Live albums ===
- Love&Peace&Rock'n'Roll Oricon Album Chart Position: 11

=== Cover albums ===
- Girls Night Out (2003)
- Me-Myself-Ann-I "Refreshed" (2004)
- Rebirth Self-cover Best (2005)
- Pink Christmas – Pukkalicious – Cheek IV (2007)

=== Singles ===
- "Shiroi Shuumatsu" (白い週末) (1971.2.25) Oricon Weekly Singles Chart Position: 77
- "Wakarimasen" (わかりません) (1973.4.25) Oricon Weekly Singles Chart Position: 44
- "Goodbye My Love" (グッド・バイ・マイ・ラブ) (1974.4.5) Oricon Weekly Singles Chart Position: 14
- "Honeymoon in Hawaii" (ハネムーン・イン・ハワイ) (1974.8.25) Oricon Weekly Singles Chart Position: 66
- "Four Season" (フォー・シーズン) (1974.11.25) Oricon Weekly Singles Chart Position: 96
- "Amai Yokan" (甘い予感) (1977.8)
- "Onna wa Sore o Gamandekinai" (女はそれを我慢できない) (1978.5.5) Oricon Weekly Singles Chart Position: 12
- "女にスジは通らない" (1978.9.5) Oricon Weekly Singles Chart Position: 43
- "I'm a Lonely Lady" (アイム・ア・ロンリー・レディ) (1979.6.25) Oricon Weekly Singles Chart Position: 61
- "Koi no Boogie Woogie Love Train" (恋のブギ・ウギ・トレイン) (1979.12.25) Oricon Weekly Singles Chart Position: 89
- "Boogie Woogie Love Train" (1980.6.5) Oricon Weekly Singles Chart Position: 64
- "Linda" (1980.8.5) Oricon Weekly Singles Chart Position: 33
- "La Saison" (ラ・セゾン) (1982.6.5) Oricon Weekly Singles Chart Position: 3
- "Luv-Ya" (1983.2.21) Oricon Weekly Singles Chart Position: 25
- "Bara no Kiseki" (薔薇の奇蹟) (1983.5.1) Oricon Weekly Singles Chart Position: 96
- "I Love You Yori Aishteru" (I Love You より愛してる) (1983.10.21) Oricon Weekly Singles Chart Position: 76
- "Roppongi Shinju" (六本木心中) (1984.10.5) Oricon Weekly Singles Chart Position: 12
- "Pink Diamond" (ピンクダイヤモンド) (1985.3.5) Oricon Weekly Singles Chart Position: 89
- "Ah, Mujyou" (あゝ無情) (1986.4.21) Oricon Weekly Singles Chart Position: 21
- "Tenshi yo Kokyou o miyo" (天使よ故郷を見よ) (1987.5.1) Oricon Weekly Singles Chart Position: 29
- "Katana" (1988.4.21) Oricon Weekly Singles Chart Position: 39
- "Bijinhakumei" (美人薄命) (1989.3.21)
- "Woman" (1989.9.6) Oricon Weekly Singles Chart Position: 31
- "Yokubou" (欲望) (1990.6.21) Oricon Weekly Singles Chart Position: 38
- "Finish!!" (1990.10.3) Oricon Weekly Singles Chart Position: 55
- "Yoru ni Kizutsuite" (夜に傷ついて) (1992.5.21) Oricon Weekly Singles Chart Position: 52
- "Lovin’ You" (1992.11.21) Oricon Weekly Singles Chart Position: 97
- "Ya! Ya!" (1993.7.21) Oricon Weekly Singles Chart Position: 57
- "Midnight Sun" (1994.5.21) Oricon Weekly Singles Chart Position: 88
- "I’m in Love" (1994.9.21) Oricon Weekly Singles Chart Position: 97
- "Womanism Rhythm" (1995.9.21) Oricon Weekly Singles Chart Position: 74
- "恋を眠らせて" (1996.8.21)
- "Vendetta" (1997.11.21)
- "Hyougara Pink" (豹柄とPink) (1998.2.21)
- "Sennen Ai" (千年愛) (1999.2.3)===Singles===
- "Shiroi Shuumatsu" (白い週末) (1971.2.25) Oricon Weekly Singles Chart Position: 77
- "Wakarimasen" (わかりません) (1973.4.25) Oricon Weekly Singles Chart Position: 44
- "Goodbye My Love" (グッド・バイ・マイ・ラブ) (1974.4.5) Oricon Weekly Singles Chart Position: 14
- "Honeymoon in Hawaii" (ハネムーン・イン・ハワイ) (1974.8.25) Oricon Weekly Singles Chart Position: 66
- "Four Season" (フォー・シーズン) (1974.11.25) Oricon Weekly Singles Chart Position: 96
- "Amai Yokan" (甘い予感) (1977.8)
- "Onna wa Sore o Gamandekinai" (女はそれを我慢できない) (1978.5.5) Oricon Weekly Singles Chart Position: 12
- "女にスジは通らない" (1978.9.5) Oricon Weekly Singles Chart Position: 43
- "I'm a Lonely Lady" (アイム・ア・ロンリー・レディ) (1979.6.25) Oricon Weekly Singles Chart Position: 61
- "Koi no Boogie Woogie Love Train" (恋のブギ・ウギ・トレイン) (1979.12.25) Oricon Weekly Singles Chart Position: 89
- "Boogie Woogie Love Train" (1980.6.5) Oricon Weekly Singles Chart Position: 64
- "Linda" (1980.8.5) Oricon Weekly Singles Chart Position: 33
- "La Saison" (ラ・セゾン) (1982.6.5) Oricon Weekly Singles Chart Position: 3
- "Luv-Ya" (1983.2.21) Oricon Weekly Singles Chart Position: 25
- "Bara no Kiseki" (薔薇の奇蹟) (1983.5.1) Oricon Weekly Singles Chart Position: 96
- "I Love You Yori Aishteru" (I Love You より愛してる) (1983.10.21) Oricon Weekly Singles Chart Position: 76
- "Roppongi Shinju" (六本木心中) (1984.10.5) Oricon Weekly Singles Chart Position: 12
- "Pink Diamond" (ピンクダイヤモンド) (1985.3.5) Oricon Weekly Singles Chart Position: 89
- "Ah, Mujyou" (あゝ無情) (1986.4.21) Oricon Weekly Singles Chart Position: 21
- "Tenshi yo Kokyou o miyo" (天使よ故郷を見よ) (1987.5.1) Oricon Weekly Singles Chart Position: 29
- "Katana" (1988.4.21) Oricon Weekly Singles Chart Position: 39
- "Bijinhakumei" (美人薄命) (1989.3.21)
- "Woman" (1989.9.6) Oricon Weekly Singles Chart Position: 31
- "Yokubou" (欲望) (1990.6.21) Oricon Weekly Singles Chart Position: 38
- "Finish!!" (1990.10.3) Oricon Weekly Singles Chart Position: 55
- "Yoru ni Kizutsuite" (夜に傷ついて) (1992.5.21) Oricon Weekly Singles Chart Position: 52
- "Lovin’ You" (1992.11.21) Oricon Weekly Singles Chart Position: 97
- "Ya! Ya!" (1993.7.21) Oricon Weekly Singles Chart Position: 57
- "Midnight Sun" (1994.5.21) Oricon Weekly Singles Chart Position: 88
- "I’m in Love" (1994.9.21) Oricon Weekly Singles Chart Position: 97
- "Womanism Rhythm" (1995.9.21) Oricon Weekly Singles Chart Position: 74
- "恋を眠らせて" (1996.8.21)
- "Vendetta" (1997.11.21)
- "Hyougara Pink" (豹柄とPink) (1998.2.21)
- "Sennen Ai" (千年愛) (1999.2.3)
