= Yosuke Tagawa =

Japanese actor and singer

- 太川 陽介
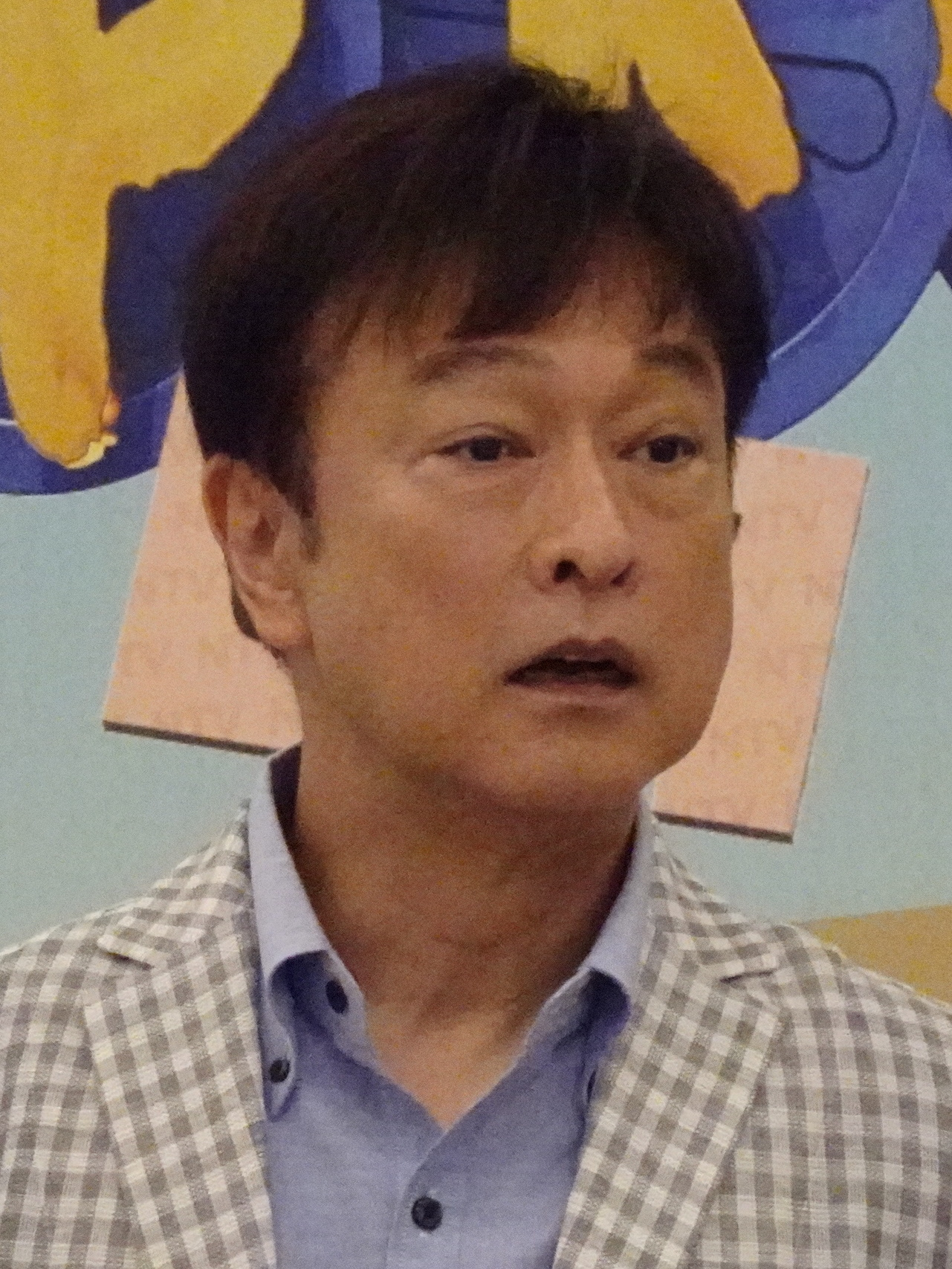
- Tagawa in 2023
- Born: Ikuo Tsubokura; 13 January 1959 (age 67); Kyōtango, Kyoto Prefecture, Japan
- Education: Japan Gakuen High School
- Years active: 1976–present
- Agent: Sun Music Production
- Website: Official profile

Yosuke Tagawa (太川 陽介, Tagawa Yōsuke; born 13 January 1959, in Ōmiya, Naka (now Kyōtango), Kyoto Prefecture, Japan) is a Japanese actor, tarento, and former idol singer. His real name is Ikuo Tsubokura (坪倉 育生, Tsubokura Ikuo).

Tagawa is a resident of Chōfu, Tokyo. He is represented by Sun Music Production.

Tagawa's wife is actress Kumiko Fujiyoshi.

== Discography ==
=== Singles ===
Year	Title	Notes
1976	"Hidamari no Naka de"	
1977	"Minamikaze"	
1977	"Lui-Lui"	
1977	"Cry Cry Cry"	
1978	"Motte Ike Omoide"	
1978	"Yo-yo"	
1978	"Boku no Nēsan"	
1978	"Sore wa nai yo Ojōsan"	
1979	"Venus in Burgin"	
1979	"Moonlight Carnival"	Let's Go Young theme
1979	"Hashire! Enoden"	
1980	"Otogibanashi"	
1980	"Kokoro no Tsubasa"	Sarutobi Sasuke ending theme
1981	"Soko ni Bishō ga"	Kakurenbo theme
1985	"Hey, Mister Bike!"	CHiPs ending theme

=== Albums ===
Year	Title
1977	Asahi ni Mukatte Hashire
1978	Seishun ni Kake
1978	Ano Hi Ano Koro
1979	Aozora Meguri
1981	Connection
2014	Toki no Tabibito

=== Best album ===
Year	Title
1978	Yosuke Tagawa: Best Hit Album
1980	Seishun no Kiseki
2007	Yosuke Tagawa Golden Best

== Filmography ==
=== Films ===
Year	Title	Role	Ref.
1984	Hare, tokidoki Satsujin	Yuzo Uemura	
1985	Yaban Hito no yō ni	Hashimoto	
1992	Watashi o Daite soshite Kiss shite	Kenichi Tanabe	
2016	Local Rosen Bus Noritsugi no Tabi: The Movie		

=== Music, variety programmes ===
Year	Title	Network	Notes	Ref.
1977	Let's Go Young	NHK-G	Sundays member; after graduating from Sundays in 1978, he became presenter	
1977	Kin-chan no doko made yaru no!?	TV Asahi	Regular appearances	
1977	Kakkurakin Dai Hōsō	NTV	Regular appearances; appeared with his song "Lui-Lui"	
	Draft Quiz	TV Tokyo		
1985	Zōshirushi Quiz: Hint de Pint	TV Asahi	"Technical Mondai", nicknamed Technical Ōji by Masaru Doi; after becoming a regular he made guest appearances	
1986	Mori no Miyako ni Hito ga yuku: Kanazawa Hyakumangoku Matsuri	MRO	Regular until 2002; guest appearances in 2013 and 2015	
2007-2019	Local Rosen Bus Noritsugi no Tabi	TV Tokyo	Regular with Yoshikazu Ebisu	
2016	Utae! Shōwa no Best Ten	BS NTV	Presenter	
2019-present	Local Rosen Bus vs Train Noritsugi Taiketsu Tabi	TV Tokyo	Regular with Miki Murai	
2020-present	Local Rosen Bus Noritsugi Taiketsu Tabi Jintori Kassen (Turf Wars)	TV Tokyo	Regular with Fumito Kawai	
2021-present	Local Rosen Bus Noritsugi Taiketsu Tabi Rosen Bus de Onigokko (Fugitive vs Demons Tag)	TV Tokyo	Regular with Toshio Matsumoto	
2021-present	Bingo Taiketsu Tabi	TV Tokyo	Regular with Reiko Takashima	

=== Informal, cultural programmes ===
Year	Title	Network	Notes
	Burari Tochū Gesha no Tabi	NTV	Quasi-regular; recent was Episode 83, aired April 2016, with Mainoumi Shūhei; appeared in two hour specials since 2012
	Gogo wa MaruMaru omoikkiri TV	NTV	
2013	Oshiete! Shishūbyō no koto	BS Fuji	Appeared in a drama (as Toru Hoshiyama)
2013	Genki ni naru! Taiwan: Shira rezaru Shin Kita no Miryoku	TV Tokyo	
	Tan Q! A Trip	TVA	
	Poshlet Morning	NTV	

=== TV drama ===
Year	Title	Role	Network	Notes
1978	Netchū Jidai	Ikumin Amagi	NTV	
1979	Netsuai Ikka Love		TBS	
1980	Sarutobi Sasuke	Sarutobi Sasuke	NTV	Lead role
1981	Nureta Kokoro: Lesbian Satsujin Jiken		TV Asahi	
1982	Ohayō 24-jikan		TBS	
1983	Sen no Rikyū		KTV	
1984	Hidamari Yokochō no Love Song		NHK	
1984	Wakakichi ni Moyuru: Yukichi Fukuzawa to Meiji no Gunzō	Inukai Tsuyoshi		
1985	Tadaima Zekkōchō!		TV Asahi	
1986	Mito Kōmon		TBS	Part 16 Episode 11, Part 20 Episodes 8 and 46, Part 22 Episode 25
1987	Abarenbō Shōgun II	Masayuki Kawai	TV Asahi	Episode 182
1987	Edo o Kiru VII	Shintaro Hayami	TBS	
1988	Kyoto Satsujin Annai	Shintaro Kusamori	ABC	Episode 14
1990	Abarenbō Shōgun III	Ikichi	TV Asahi	
1990	Binta		TBS	
1992	Ōoka Echizen Dai 12-bu	Kiyotaro	TBS	Episode 22
1992	Tantei Kyosuke Kamizu no Satsujin Suiri	Kenzo Matsushita	TV Asahi	
1994	Edo o Kiru VII	Shogo Yuki		
1999	Inochi no Genba kara		MBS	
2001	Tensai terebi-kun		NHK	
2005	Shin Kasōken no Onna 2		TV Asahi	
2008	Men-dol: Ikemen Idol	Keishi Sarukawa	TV Tokyo	
2009	Tsubasa	Ryo Maruyama	NHK	
2009	Zaimu Sōsa-kan Ruriko Amemiya 5		TBS	
2011	Kenji Yoko Asahina	Kenji Nogami	TV Asahi	
2014	Aibō	Takumi Tomobe	TV Asahi	Season 12 Episode 18
2014	Keishichō Sōsaikkachō: Hira kara Nariagatta Saikyō no Keiji! 3	Akira Matsushima	TV Asahi	
2015	MaruMaru Zuma	Taxi driver		
2016	Nobunaga Moyu	Prince Masahito		

=== Radio ===
Year	Title	Network
1996	Saturday Hot Request	NHK FM
	Nissan hotto Wave Yosuke no Kibun wa Dainoji Dai Hōsō	SBS
2009	Yosuke Tagawa no 1, 2, Sun!	NBC

=== Stage ===
Year	Title	Role	Notes
1977	Ganbare Genki	Genki Horiguchi	Lead role
2007	Tsuma o metoraba: Akiko to Tekkan	Hakushu Kitahara	
2011	The Makioka Sisters	Saburo Akira	
2015	South Pacific	Luther Bilis	
2017	Kiss Me, Kate	Gang	

=== Advertisements ===
Year	Title	Notes
	Hoya Corporation	
	Kukure Kurry	
	Chardin Liquid	Koji Aihara's manga Koji En appeared in a scene of the advert
	Ribbon Citron	
	Kanko Company	
	Kikkoman	
2014	Manulife	Co-starring with Yoshikazu Ebisu

== Bibliography ==
Year	Title
2014	Lui-Lui Shikiri-jutsu: Jinsei mo Kaisha mo Rosen Bus no Tabi mo Deikō ni Michibiku 40 no Tsubo
