= Machiko Watanabe =

- Born: 23 October 1956 (age 69)
- Website: https://kamome-music.com/

Machiko Watanabe (渡辺真知子; born 23 October 1956) is a Japanese pop singer-songwriter.

== Biography ==
As a schoolgirl, she won an audition for Takeshi Terauchi in Kannai, Yokohama, but was advised that she finish secondary school before starting a musical career.

As a freshman at Senzoku Gakuen Junior College, she won a special prize at the Yamaha Popular Song Contest. Overall, she participated in the contest four times, two years in a row in spring and summer.

At the age of 21, in November 1977, she debuted with the single "Mayoimichi" (迷い道; "Wandering Road") that made her famous virtually overnight and would sell 800,000 copies. She continued with the hits "Kamome ga Tonda Hi" (かもめが翔んだ日; "The Day the Seagull Flew Away") and "Blue" (ブルー).

- "Kamome ga Tonda Hi" on YouTube

"Kamome ga Tonda Hi" earned her the Japan Record Award for Best New Artist in 1978. Another of her most famous songs is "Kuchibiru yo, Atsuku Kimi o Katare" (唇よ、熱く君を語れ) from 1980.

Preceded by Kentaro Shimizu	Japan Record Award for Best New Artist; 1978	Succeeded by Tomoko Kuwae
