= Yumi Matsutoya discography =

- Studio albums: 39
- Extended plays: 1
- Live albums: 2
- Singles: 41

The discography of Yumi Matsutoya, a Japanese singer-songwriter, consists of forty studio albums and EPs, forty-one singles, two live albums, and several compilation albums. It also denotes her early four albums and seven singles that were released under her maiden name Yumi Arai.

== Albums ==
=== Studio albums ===
As Yumi Arai

Year	Title	Album details	Peak chart positions
Year	Title	Album details	JPN
1973	Hikō-ki Gumo (ひこうき雲)	Released: November 20, 1973; Label: Express	8
1974	Misslim	Released: October 5, 1974; Label: Express	9
1975	Cobalt Hour	Released: June 20, 1975; Label: Express	2
1976	The 14th Moon Jūyon-Ban Me no Tsuki (14番目の月)	Released: November 20, 1976; Label: Express	1

As Yumi Matsutoya

Year	Title	Details	Peak chart positions
Year	Title	Details	JPN
1978	Benisuzume (紅雀)	Released: March 5, 1978; Label: Express	2
1978	Ryūsenkei '80 (流線形'80)	Released: November 5, 1978; Label: Express	4
1979	Olive	Released: July 20, 1979; Label: Express	5
1979	The Gallery in My Heart (悲しいほどお天気, Kanashī Hodo Otenki)	Released: December 1, 1979; Label: Rxpress	6
1980	Toki no Nai Hotel (時のないホテル)	Released: June 21, 1980; Label: Express	3
1980	Surf & Snow	Released: December 1, 1980; Label: Express	7
1981	Mizu no Naka no Asia e (水の中のASIAへ)	EP; Released: May 21, 1981; Label: Express	9
1981	Sakuban Oaishimashō (昨晩お会いしましょう)	Released: November 1, 1981; Label: Express	1
1982	Pearl Pierce	Released: June 21, 1982; Label: Express	1
1983	Reincarnation	Released: February 21, 1983; Label: Express	1
1983	Voyager	Released: December 1, 1983; Label: Express	1
1984	No Side	Released: December 1, 1984; Label: Express	1
1985	Da-Di-Da	Released: November 30, 1985; Label: Express	1
1986	Alarm à la mode	Released: November 29, 1986; Label: Express	1
1987	Before the Diamond Dust Fades... Diamondo Dasuto ga Kienu Ma ni (ダイアモンドダストが消えぬまに)	Released: December 5, 1987; Label: Express	1
1988	Delight Slight Light Kiss	Released: November 26, 1988; Label: Express	1
1989	Love Wars	Released: November 25, 1989; Label: Express; RIAJ Certification: Million	1
1990	The Gates of Heaven (天国のドア, Tengoku no Doa)	Released: November 23, 1990; Label: Express; RIAJ Certification: 2× Million	1
1991	Dawn Purple	Released: November 22, 1991; Label: Express; RIAJ Certification: 2× Million	1
1992	Tears and Reasons	Released: November 27, 1992; Label: Express; RIAJ Certification: Million	1
1993	U-miz	Released: November 26, 1993; Label: Express; RIAJ Certification: Million	1
1994	The Dancing Sun	Released: November 25, 1994; Label: Express; RIAJ Certification: 2× Million	1
1995	Kathmandu	Released: December 1, 1995; Label: Express; RIAJ Certification: Million	1
1997	Cowgirl Dreamin'	Released: February 28, 1997; Label: Express; RIAJ Certification: Million; IFPI HK Certification: Gold	1
1997	The Wave of Zuvuya (スユアの波, Suyua no Nami)	Released: December 5, 1997; Label: Express	2
1999	Frozen Roses	Released: November 17, 1999; Label: Express	3
2001	Acacia	Released: June 6, 2001; Label: Express	2
2002	Wings of Winter, Shades of Summer	Released: November 20, 2002; Label: Capitol; RIAJ Certification: Gold	2
2004	Viva 6×7	Released: November 10, 2004; Label: Capitol; RIAJ Certification: Gold	5
2006	A Girl in Summer	Released: May 24, 2006; Label: Capitol; RIAJ Certification: Gold	3
2009	And I Will Dream Again Soshite Mō Ichido Yume Miru Darō (そしてもう一度夢見るだろう)	Released: April 8, 2009; Label: Capitol; RIAJ Certification: Gold	4
2011	Road Show	Released: April 6, 2011; Label: Capitol; RIAJ Certification: Gold	2
2013	Pop Classico	Released: November 20, 2013; Label: EMI Records Japan; RIAJ Certification: Gold	2
2016	Uchū Toshokan (宇宙図書館)	Released: November 2, 2016; Label: EMI; RIAJ Certification: Gold	1
2020	Shinkai no Machi (深海の街)	Released: December 1, 2020; Label: EMI; RIAJ Certification: Gold	3

As Yumi AraI

Year	Title	Album details	Peak chart positions
Year	Title	Album details	JPN
2025	Wormhole	Released: October 29, 2025; Label: EMI Records Japan	2

=== Live albums ===
Year	Title	Details	Peak chart positions
Year	Title	Details	JPN
1986	Yuming Visualive Da-Di-Da	Released: June 25, 1986; Label: Express	1
1996	Yumi Arai Concert with Old Friends	Released: December 7, 1996; Label: Express	5

=== Compilation albums ===
Before the artist purchased all the rights of her early songs in 2000, Yumi Arai's former publishing company Alfa Music, which had evolved into a full-fledged record label in 1977, had issued over half a dozen of unauthorized compilation albums (they had the ancillary rights for her material at the time). In addition, EMI Music Japan also released a piles of budget-priced compilations on audio cassettes during the 1970s and the early 1980s.

Following materials are the official retrospective albums: Yuming Brand Part I, Album, Super Best of Yumi Arai, Neue Musik, Sweet, bittersweet, The Greatest Hits, Seasons Colours, and The Best of Yumi Matsutoya 40th Anniversary.

as Yumi Arai

Year	Title	Details	Peak chart positions
Year	Title	Details	JPN
1976	Yuming Brand	Released: June 20, 1976; Label: Express	1
1979	Yuming Brand Part II	Released: November 21, 1979; Label: Alfa	—
1981	Yuming Brand Part III	Released: March 25, 1981; Label: Alfa	—
1987	Singles 1972-1976	Released: March 25, 1987; Label: Alfa	45
1987	Yuming History	Released: November 28, 1987; Label: Alfa	30
1990	Ketteiban: Arai Yumi Best Selection (決定盤～荒井由実ベストセレクション)	Released: September 11, 1990; Label: Alfa	—
1992	Yuming Collection	Released: September 21, 1992; Label: Alfa	34
1996	Twins: Super Best of Yumi Arai	Released: August 28, 1996; Label: Alfa	9
2004	Yumi Arai 1972-1976	Box set (4 remastered studio albums, bonus disc and DVD); Released: January 27, 2003; Label: Express	39
"—" denotes releases that did not chart

as Yumi Matsutoya

Year	Title	Details	Peak chart positions
Year	Title	Details	JPN
1977	Album	Released: December 25, 1977; Label: Express	12
1998	Neue Musik: Yumi Matsutoya Complete Best Vol.1	Released: November 5, 1998; Label: Express; RIAJ Certification: 3× Million	1
1999	Yumi Matsutoya 1978-1989	Box set (17 remastered studio albums); Released: January 27, 1999; Label: Express	85
2001	Sweet, bittersweet	Released: November 14, 2001; Label: Express; RIAJ Certification: Million	1
2002	Yuming the Greatest Hits	Released: March 29, 2002 (in Hong Kong only); Label: Express	—
2003	Yuming Compositions: Faces	Released: December 17, 2003; Label: Capitol; RIAJ Certification: Platinum	3
2007	Seasons Colours: Spring/Summer Selection (春夏撰曲集)	Released: March 7, 2007; Label: Express; RIAJ Certification: Gold; Sales: 114,412	6
2007	Seasons Colours: Autumn/Winter Selection (秋冬撰曲集)	Released: October 24, 2007; Label: Capitol; RIAJ Certification: Gold; Sales: 80,432	3
2012	The Best of Yumi Matsutoya 40th Anniversary Nihon no Koi to, Yuming to. (日本の恋と、ユーミンと。)	Released: November 20, 2012; Label: Capitol; RIAJ Certification: Million; Sales: 1,063,415 (Gold Disc Edition sales: 30,699, digital sales: 25,362 included)	1
2018	From Yuming, a Song of Love Yumin kara no, koi no uta. (ユーミンからの、恋のうた。)	Released: April 11, 2018; Label: EMI; RIAJ Certification: Platinum; Sales: 226,405 (Digital sales: 626 included)	1
2022	Yuming Banzai!: Yumi Matsutoya 50th Anniversary Best Album (ユーミン万歳! ～松任谷由実50周年記念ベストアルバム～)	Released: October 4, 2022; Label: EMI; RIAJ Certification: 2× Platinum; Sales: 440,011	1
2023	Yuming Kanpai!!: Yumi Matsutoya 50th Anniversary Collaboration Best Album (ユーミン乾杯!!~松任谷由実50周年記念コラボベストアルバム~)	Released: December 20, 2023; Label: EMI; Sales: 57,490	2
"—" denotes a release that did not chart or was not released in that territory.

== Singles ==
As Yumi Arai

Year	Title	Peak chart positions
Year	Title	JPN
1972	"Henji wa Iranai" (返事はいらない)	—
1973	"Kitto Ieru" (きっと言える)	—
1974	"Yasashisa ni Tsutsumareta nara" (やさしさに包まれたなら)	—
1974	"Jūnigatsu no Ame"" (12月の雨)	—
1975	"Rouge no Dengon" (ルージュの伝言)	45
1975	"Ano Hi ni Kaeritai" (あの日にかえりたい)	1
1976	"Kageriyuku Heya" (翳りゆく部屋)	10
1996	"Machibuse" (まちぶせ)	5

As Yumi Matsutoya

Year	Title	Peak chart positions
Year	Title	JPN
1977	"Shiokaze ni Chigirete" (潮風にちぎれて)	31
1977	"Tōi Tabiji"(遠い旅路)	38
1978	"Harujoon Himejoon"" (ハルジョオン･ヒメジョオン)	80
1978	"Irie no Gogo San-Ji" (入り江の午後3時)	88
1978	"Futo o Wataru Kaze" (埠頭を渡る風)	71
1979	"Kishū"(帰愁)	89
1980	"Esper"	77
1980	"Hakujitsumu (Daydream)"" (白日夢･DAYDREAM)	44
1980	"Hoshi no Rouge-rain"" (星のルージュリアン)	46
1981	"Mamotte Agetai" (守ってあげたい)	2
1981	"Yūyami o Hitori"(夕闇をひとり)	48
1983	"Dandelion (Osozaki no Tampopo)" (ダンデライオン～遅咲きのたんぽぽ)	9
1984	"Voyager (Hizuke no Nai Bohyō)" (VOYAGER～日付のない墓標)	9
1985	"Metropolis no Katasumi de" (メトロポリスの片隅で)	8
1987	"Sweet Dreams"	7
1989	"Anniversary (Mugen ni Calling You)" (ANNIVERSARY～無限にCALLING YOU)	2
1993	"Manatsu no Yo no Yume" (真夏の夜の夢)	1
1994	"Hello, My Friend"	1
1994	"Haru yo, Koi"(春よ、来い)	1
1995	"Inochi no Hana" (命の花) (Promo only)	—
1995	"Rondo"(輪舞曲)	2
1996	"Saigo no Uso"(最後の嘘)	4
1997	"Kokuhaku"(告白)	10
1997	"Sunny Day Holiday"	10
1999	"Lost Highway"	20
2000	"Partnership"	18
2001	"Shiawase ni Naru Tame ni" (幸せになるために)	6
2001	"7 Truths 7 Lies"	16
2003	"Setsugekka"(雪月花)	59
2005	"Tsuite Yuku wa" (ついてゆくわ)	13
2006	"Niji no Shita no Doshaburi de" (虹の下のどしゃ降りで)	22
2007	"Ningyohime no Yume" (人魚姫の夢)	16
2010	"Dance no Yō ni Dakiyosetai" (ダンスのように抱き寄せたい)	15
2012	"Koi o Release" (恋をリリース)	34

As featured artist

Year	Title	Peak chart positions
Year	Title	JPN
1985	"Ima Dakara" (今だから) (with Kazumasa Oda and Kazuo Zaitsu)	1
1992	"Ai no Wave" (愛のWAVE) (with Carl Smokey Ishii)	1
1993	"Ima, Bokutachi ni Dekiru Koto" (今、僕たちに出来る事) (Stop the AIDS Campaign song) (The All Night Nippon Personalities)	23
2000	"Millennium" (Yuming+Pocket Biscuits)	7
2006	"Cappuccino" (Hiroshi Fujiwara feat. Eric Clapton)	201
2006	"Still Crazy for You" (Crazy Cats and Yuming)	14
2006	"Knockin' at the Door" (The Friends of Love the Earth Project)	158
2007	"Music" (Golden Circle feat. Yohito Teraoka/Yumi Matsutoya/Yuzu)	1
2008	"Kinenbi" (記念日) (SoulJa + Misslim)	24
2009	"Shirt o Araeba" (シャツを洗えば) (The Gap 40th Anniversary Campaign Single) (Quruli and Yuming)	—
