= Matsutoya =

Matsutoya (written: 松任谷) is a Japanese surname. Notable people with the surname include:

- Masataka Matsutoya (松任谷 正隆, born 1951), Japanese musician, composer and singer-songwriter
- Yumi Matsutoya (松任谷 由実, born 1954), Japanese singer-songwriter and composer
