= The Wind Rises =

2013 Japanese film by Hayao Miyazaki

- Theatrical release poster

Japanese name
- Japanese: 風立ちぬ
- Literal meaning: The Wind Has Risen
Transcriptions
- Revised Hepburn: Kaze Tachinu
- Directed by: Hayao Miyazaki
- Screenplay by: Hayao Miyazaki
- Based on: 風立ちぬ (The Wind Has Risen) by Hayao Miyazaki
- Produced by: Toshio Suzuki
- Starring: Hideaki Anno; Miori Takimoto; Hidetoshi Nishijima; Masahiko Nishimura; Morio Kazama; Keiko Takeshita; Mirai Shida; Jun Kunimura; Shinobu Otake; Nomura Mansai
- Cinematography: Atsushi Okui
- Edited by: Takeshi Seyama
- Music by: Joe Hisaishi
- Production company: Studio Ghibli
- Distributed by: Toho
- Release date: 20 July 2013 (Japan)
- Running time: 126 minutes
- Country: Japan
- Language: Japanese
- Budget: US$30 million
- Box office: US$137.1 million

The Wind Rises (Japanese: 風立ちぬ, Hepburn: Kaze Tachinu; lit. 'The Wind Has Risen') is a 2013 Japanese animated historical drama film written and directed by Hayao Miyazaki based on his 2009 manga of the same name. Produced by Studio Ghibli and distributed by Toho, the film stars the voices of Hideaki Anno, Miori Takimoto, Hidetoshi Nishijima, Masahiko Nishimura, Morio Kazama, Keiko Takeshita, Mirai Shida, Jun Kunimura, Shinobu Otake, and Nomura Mansai.

The film portrays a fictionalised account of the life of Japanese aeronautical engineer Jiro Horikoshi, in particular his engineering career from his time at the University of Tokyo in 1923 to the first test flight of the Mitsubishi Ka-14 on 4 February 1935. Juxtaposed with the historical events is a fictional romance of Horikoshi's, inspired by the similarly named semi-autobiographical novel The Wind Has Risen by Tatsuo Hori. The film was originally intended to be Miyazaki's final feature film, before Miyazaki reversed his decision and eventually directed The Boy and the Heron.

Released on 20 July 2013 in Japan, The Wind Rises was the highest-grossing Japanese film of 2013. Though it caused some political controversy and criticism in Asia, it was met with critical acclaim. The film was nominated for several awards, including the Academy Award for Best Animated Feature, the Golden Globe Award for Best Foreign Language Film, and the Japan Academy Prize for Animation of the Year, winning the latter.

== Plot ==
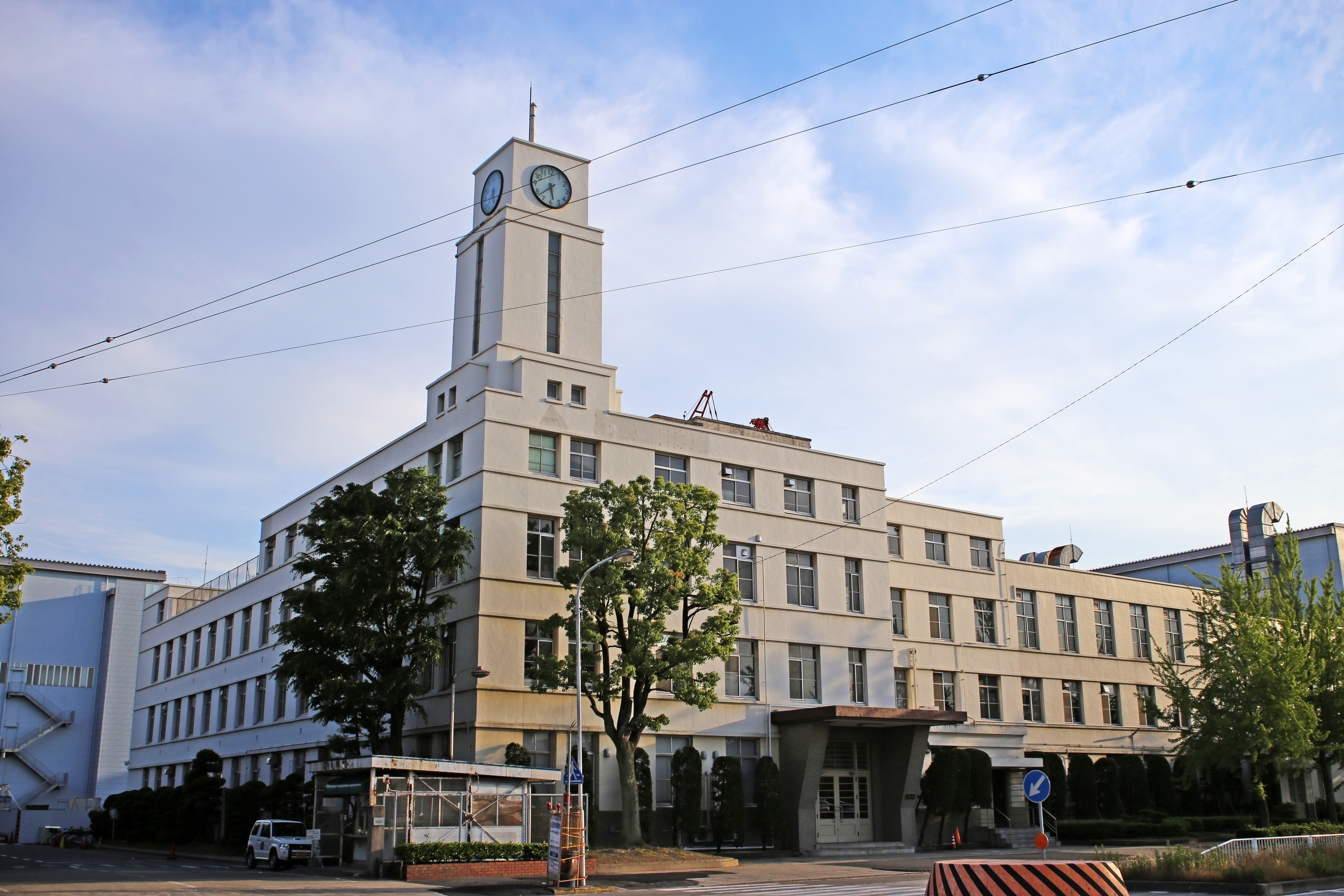
Mitsubishi aircraft manufacturing factory, Nagoya

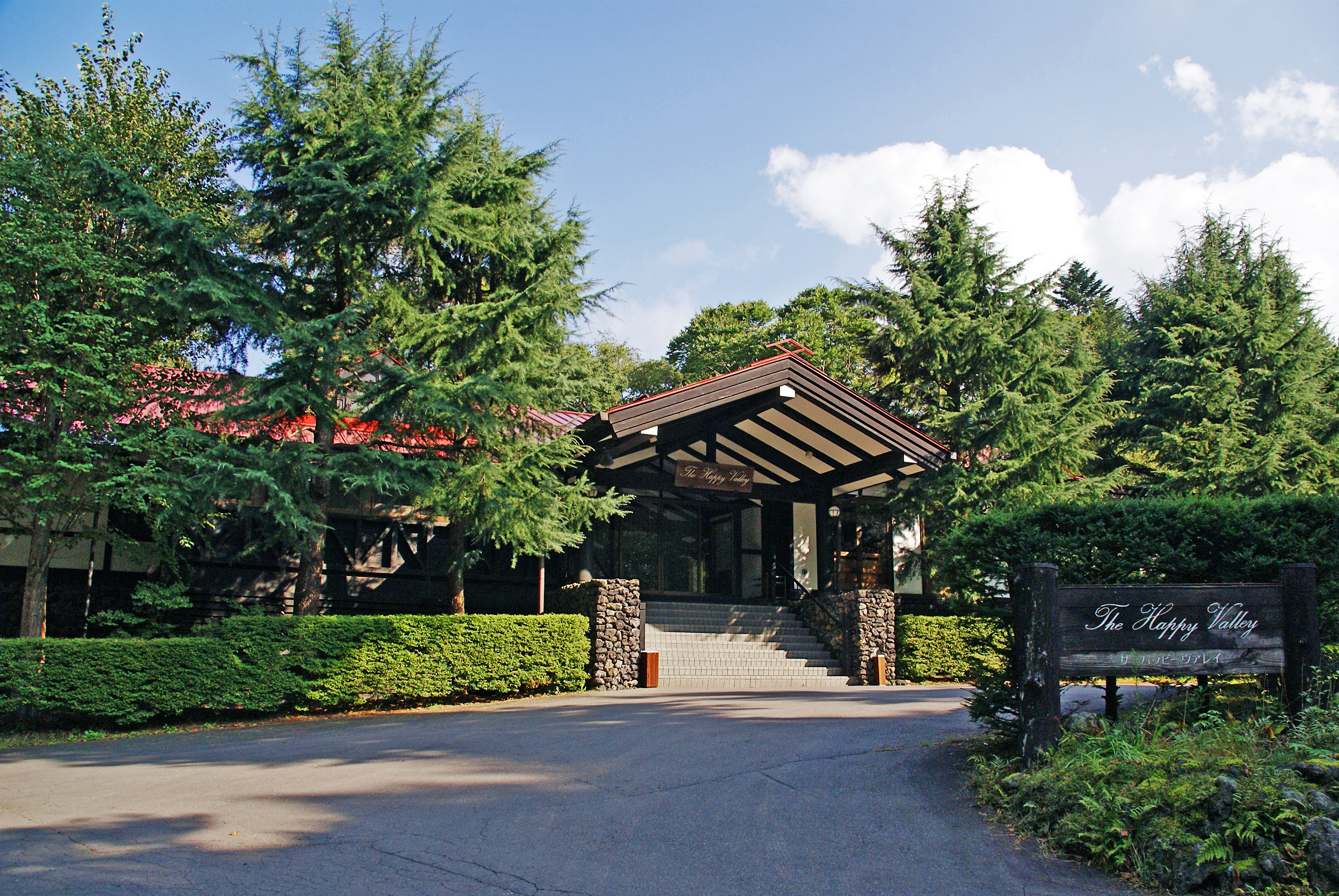
Mampei Hotel, Karuizawa

In 1918, a young Jiro Horikoshi longs to become a pilot, but his nearsightedness prevents it. Inspired by a magazine, he begins having recurring dreams of flying with his idol, Italian aircraft designer Giovanni Battista Caproni, aboard Caproni's aircraft. Caproni tells him that he has never flown a plane in his life, and that building planes is better than flying them. Five years later, following the failure of the Caproni Ca.60, Jiro is an aeronautical engineering student at Tokyo Imperial University. While travelling home from a visit with family, he meets a young girl, Nahoko Satomi, travelling with her maid Kinu. The Great Kantō earthquake suddenly hits, and Kinu's leg is broken. Jiro helps Nahoko carry her to Nahoko's family home, leaving without exchanging names.

In 1925, Jiro graduates with his friend Kiro Honjo, and both are employed at aeroplane manufacturer Mitsubishi amidst the Great Depression. They are assigned to perfect a fighter plane, the Mitsubishi 1MF9, for the Imperial Army. During a test, it breaks apart in midair while attempting to pass 200 knots and is rejected. Pivoting their plans, Mitsubishi sends Jiro and Honjo to the Weimar Republic in 1929 to obtain a production licence for a Junkers G.38, intending to build a bomber. Although Hugo Junkers welcomes them, the two men are blocked from obtaining complete plans by the Sicherheitspolizei. With them and their coworkers discouraged by how far back Japan's aeronautics technology is from the rest of the world, Jiro returns to Japan, while Honjo stays and eventually develops the Mitsubishi G4M.

In early 1932, Jiro is promoted to chief designer for a fighter plane competition sponsored by the Imperial Navy, but his design, the Mitsubishi 1MF10, fails testing in 1933 and is rejected. Disappointed, he takes a vacation at a summer resort in Karuizawa. There he reunites with an adult Nahoko, who has been searching for him since they first met. The two quickly develop a romance, assisted by a German tourist he calls Castorp. Critical of Nazi Germany, Castorp privately tells Jiro that Adolf Hitler has apprehended Junkers for resisting Nazism, and that Germany must be stopped from declaring another world war, this time allied with Japan. He then flees arrest from the Special Higher Police.

Later, Nahoko is diagnosed with tuberculosis, so Jiro asks Nahoko's father for his blessing to marry her, and the two are engaged. However, Nahoko wishes to wait until she recovers to marry, and moves back in with her family. Wanted in connection with Castorp, Jiro hides at his supervisor Kurokawa's home while he works on a new fighter project for the Imperial Navy. Jiro briefly leaves when Nahoko suffers from a pulmonary haemorrhage. After Jiro briefly tends to her, Nahoko decides to check into a mountain sanatorium to recover, but cannot bear being apart from Jiro and returns to be with him. Kurokawa and his wife marry the two and allow the couple to stay in their home with Nahoko's father's permission. Jiro's sister Kayo, a doctor, warns Jiro that his marriage to Nahoko will end tragically as tuberculosis is incurable. Though Nahoko's health deteriorates, she and Jiro enjoy their fleeting time together.

Jiro leaves for the test flight of his new prototype aeroplane, the Mitsubishi Ka-14. Knowing that she will die soon, Nahoko leaves farewell letters for Jiro, her family, and friends and discreetly leaves the house in a vain attempt to return to the sanatorium. At the test site, Jiro is distracted from his success by a gust of wind, suggesting Nahoko's passing.

In 1945, after Japan has lost World War II, Jiro dreams of Caproni again, regretting that his plane was used for war. Caproni comforts him, saying that Jiro's dream of building beautiful aeroplanes was nonetheless realised, in the form of his masterpiece—the A6M 'Zero' fighter. Nahoko's spirit also appears, encouraging her husband to live on. After her spirit departs, Jiro and Caproni walk together into their shared kingdom of dreams.

== Voice cast ==
Character	Japanese	English
Jiro Horikoshi (堀越 二郎, Horikoshi Jirō)	Hideaki Anno Kaichi Kaburagi^{Y}	Joseph Gordon-Levitt Zach Callison^{Y}
Nahoko Satomi (里見 菜穂子, Satomi Nahoko)	Miori Takimoto Mayu Iino^{Y}	Emily Blunt Madeleine Rose Yen^{Y}
Kiro Honjo (本庄 季郎, Honjō Kirō)	Hidetoshi Nishijima	John Krasinski
Kurokawa (黒川)	Masahiko Nishimura	Martin Short
Castorp (カストルプ, Kasutorupu)	Stephen Alpert	Werner Herzog
Satomi (里見)	Morio Kazama	William H. Macy
Jiro's mother (二郎の母, Jirō no haha)	Keiko Takeshita	Edie Mirman
Kayo Horikoshi (堀越 加代, Horikoshi Kayo)	Mirai Shida Maki Shinta^{Y}	Mae Whitman Eva Bella^{Y}
Hattori (服部)	Jun Kunimura	Mandy Patinkin
Mrs. Kurokawa (黒川夫人, Kurokawa fujin)	Shinobu Otake	Jennifer Grey
Giovanni Battista Caproni (カプローニ, Kapurōni)	Nomura Mansai	Stanley Tucci
Kinu (絹)	Haruka Shibuya	Mae Whitman
Sone (曽根)		Elijah Wood
Mitsubishi employee (三菱の従業員, Mitsubishi no jūgyōin)		Ronan Farrow
Katayama (片山)		Darren Criss
Flight Engineer		David Cowgill

== Production ==
=== Development ===
The film's title comes from the poetic line:
"Le vent se lève!... Il faut tenter de vivre! ("The wind rises!... We must try to live!")" ' — Paul Valéry, "Le Cimetière Marin" (The Graveyard by the Sea).

The Wind Rises was directed by Hayao Miyazaki, his first feature film since Ponyo in 2008.

Miyazaki began to conceive a story to illustrate the life of Jiro Horikoshi in 2008. He published the story as a manga series in the Model Graphix magazine's April 2009 to January 2010 issues as a continuation of his Delusional Notes series, and it was collected into one volume in October 2015. The title is an allusion to Paul Valéry's 1920 poem "Le Cimetière Marin" (The Graveyard by the Sea). The film also references Tatsuo Hori's 1937 semi-autobiographical novel The Wind Has Risen (風立ちぬ^{?}), and uses visuals to depict Hori's words. The manga portrayed certain characters as anthropomorphised pigs, employing a design reminiscent of that seen in Miyazaki's film Porco Rosso (1992).

The story in the manga follows the historical account of Horikoshi's aircraft development up to 1935 (the year of the Mitsubishi A5M's maiden flight), and intertwines with fictional encounters with Caproni and Nahoko Satomi (里見 菜穂子^{?}). The scenes with Nahoko in the manga included elements from the novel The Wind Has Risen, in which Tatsuo Hori wrote about his life experience with his fiancée, Ayako Yano (矢野 綾子^{?}), before she died from tuberculosis. The name Nahoko Satomi was created from the female protagonist of another novel by Tatsuo Hori, Nahoko (菜穂子^{?}).

Characters frequently discuss Thomas Mann's novel The Magic Mountain, and, in a letter to Nahoko, Jiro names his fleeing German friend "Mr. Castorp" after its protagonist. The character himself is a caricature of Stephen Alpert, who was once the executive director of Ghibli's international division. He left the company in 2011 for personal reasons, but was instrumental in Ghibli's overseas expansion. He was asked to return to Japan to model for the character's appearance and a suitable voice.

After the release of Ponyo, Miyazaki wanted his next film to be a sequel to the film, but producer Toshio Suzuki proposed to adapt the manga The Wind Has Risen instead. At first, Miyazaki rejected the proposal because he created the manga as a hobby and considered its subjects not suitable for children, the traditional audience of Studio Ghibli's features. However, he changed his mind when a staff member suggested that "children should be allowed to be exposed to subjects they are not familiar with". He was also inspired to make the film after reading a quote from Horikoshi: "All I wanted to do was to make something beautiful".

=== Music ===
The 32-track film score was composed and conducted by Joe Hisaishi, and performed by the Yomiuri Nippon Symphony Orchestra. It features Yumi Matsutoya's 1973 song "Hikō-ki Gumo" (ひこうき雲). Matsutoya previously collaborated with Studio Ghibli on Kiki's Delivery Service, which features her songs "Rūju no Dengon" (ルージュの伝言) and "Yasashisa ni Tsutsumaretanara" (やさしさに包まれたなら). Producer Suzuki recommended "Hikō-ki Gumo" to Miyazaki in December 2012, feeling the lyrics resembled the story of The Wind Rises. "Das gibt's nur einmal" (English: It only happens once) is the German song Hans Castorp sings while playing the piano at Hotel Kusakaru. The soundtrack was released in Japan on 17 July 2013 by Tokuma Japan Communications.

== Release ==
The Wind Rises was to have been released simultaneously with The Tale of the Princess Kaguya, another Ghibli film, by Isao Takahata, in Japan in mid-2013. It would have been the first time the directors' works were released together since the release of My Neighbor Totoro and Grave of the Fireflies in 1988. However, Princess Kaguya was delayed until 23 November 2013, and The Wind Rises was released on 20 July 2013.

The Wind Rises played in competition at the 70th Venice International Film Festival. It had its North American premiere at the 2013 Toronto International Film Festival, although a sneak preview was presented earlier at the 2013 Telluride Film Festival, outside of the official program.

Walt Disney Studios Motion Pictures distributed The Wind Rises in North America through its Touchstone Pictures banner. English dubbing was directed by Gary Rydstrom. Disney held a one-week release window in the Los Angeles theatrical circuit beginning on 8 November 2013, so that it could qualify for Academy Awards consideration. It was released theatrically on 21 February 2014 in select cities, with wide release on 28 February. It was released in the United Kingdom on 9 May 2014 by StudioCanal.

=== Home media ===
Walt Disney Studios Japan released The Wind Rises on Blu-ray Disc and DVD in Japan on 18 June 2014. The Japanese DVD release sold 128,784 units until 7 December 2014 and a further 6,735 units between 8 December 2014 and 7 June 2015, for a combined 141,245 DVD units as of 7 June 2015.

In the United States, Walt Disney Studios Home Entertainment released the film on Blu-ray Disc and DVD on 18 November 2014. The release includes supplement features with storyboards, the original Japanese trailers and TV spots, a "Behind the Microphone" featurette with members of the English voice cast, and a video from when the film was announced to be completed. The audio for both English and Japanese language is monophonic (DTS-HD MA 1.0). Even though the North American rights Disney owned on Studio Ghibli films expired in 2017, Walt Disney Studios Home Entertainment continued to distribute The Wind Rises until 2020, when GKIDS re-released it on DVD and Blu-ray on 22 September 2020 with distribution through Shout! Factory. The re-release took longer than with other Studio Ghibli titles as it was still a fairly new film, and Disney still held the US rights.

The Wind Rises has grossed over $9 million from physical DVD and Blu-ray sales in the US. In the United Kingdom, it was 2015's fifth-best-selling foreign-language film on home video, and third best-selling Asian film (below The Raid 2 and The Tale of the Princess Kaguya).

== Reception ==
=== Box office ===
The Wind Rises grossed ¥11.6 billion (US$113 million) at the Japanese box office, the highest-grossing film in Japan in 2013.

=== Critical response ===
On the review aggregator website Rotten Tomatoes, 88% of 182 critics' reviews are positive, with an average rating of 8.0/10. The website's consensus reads: "The Wind Rises is a fittingly bittersweet swan song for director Hayao Miyazaki." Metacritic, which uses a weighted average, assigned the film a score of 83 out of 100, based on 41 critics, indicating "universal acclaim".

Critic David Ehrlich rated The Wind Rises 9.7/10 and called it "perhaps the greatest animated film ever made". He wrote: "While initially jarring, Miyazaki's unapologetic deviations from fact help The Wind Rises to transcend the linearity of its expected structure, the film eventually revealing itself to be less of a biopic than it is a devastatingly honest lament for the corruption of beauty, and how invariably pathetic the human response to that loss must be. Miyazaki's films are often preoccupied with absence, the value of things left behind and how the ghosts of beautiful things are traced onto our memories like the shadows of objects outlined by a nuclear flash. The Wind Rises looks back as only a culminating work can." Peter Bradshaw of The Guardian called the film "visually exquisite and emotionally charged". Mark Kermode called it "a rich treat for the eye and soul alike".

Scott Foundas of Variety wrote: "The score by frequent Miyazaki collaborator Joe Hisaishi recalls Nino Rota in its lilting accordion-and-mandolin main theme." Dana Stevens of Slate called it as a "romantic orchestral score". Alonso Duralde of TheWrap wrote "Joe Hisaishi contributes another in his series of legendary scores for the director." The Japan Times gave The Wind Rises three and a half out of five, and stated: "A visually sumptuous celebration of an unspoiled prewar Japan." In The Asia-Pacific Journal, Matthew Penney wrote: "What Miyazaki offers is a layered look at how Horikoshi's passion for flight was captured by capital and militarism", and that it was "one of Miyazaki's most ambitious and thought-provoking visions as well as one of his most beautifully realized visual projects". In 2025, The Wind Rises was voted number 235 voted for the "Readers' Choice" edition of The New York Times' list of "The 100 Best Movies of the 21st Century," finishing at number 235.

=== Controversy ===
In Japan, The Wind Rises received criticism from both the Japanese political right and from the Japan Society for Tobacco Control. Miyazaki added to the controversy by publishing an essay in which he criticised the proposal by Japan's right-wing Liberal Democratic Party to change Article 9 of the Japanese Constitution to allow Japan to remilitarise.

Miyazaki also attracted political criticism from South Korean internet users, who argued that the Zero represents Japanese military aggression and that many planes were assembled by Korean forced labour. Miyazaki told South Korean journalists that "[Horikoshi] was someone who resisted demands from the military...I wonder if he should be liable for anything just because he lived in that period." In an interview with the Asahi Shimbun, Miyazaki said he had "very complex feelings" about World War II since, as a pacifist, he felt militarist Japan had acted out of "foolish arrogance". However, he also said that the Zero plane "represented one of the few things we Japanese could be proud of—[they] were a truly formidable presence, and so were the pilots who flew them".

=== Accolades ===
The Wind Rises received 13 nominations and 17 awards for "Best Animated Feature", including one Academy Award nomination. Hayao Miyazaki won the award for Writing in an Animated Feature Production at the 41st Annie Awards. The film's musical composer, Joe Hisaishi, received the Japan Academy Prize for Best Music Score. The film was also selected as "Audience Favorite – Animation" at the Mill Valley Film Festival.

Accolades received by The Wind Rises
Award	Date of ceremony	Category	Recipient(s)	Result	Ref.
Academy Awards	2 March 2014	Best Animated Feature	Hayao Miyazaki and Toshio Suzuki	Nominated	
Annie Awards	1 February 2014	Best Animated Feature	The Wind Rises	Nominated	
Annie Awards	1 February 2014	Outstanding Achievement for Character Animation in a Feature Production	Kitarō Kōsaka	Nominated	
Annie Awards	1 February 2014	Outstanding Achievement for Writing in a Feature Production	Hayao Miyazaki	Won	
Golden Globe Awards	12 January 2014	Best Foreign Language Film	The Wind Rises	Nominated	
Japan Academy Film Prize	7 March 2014	Animation of the Year	The Wind Rises	Won	
Japan Academy Film Prize	7 March 2014	Outstanding Achievement in Music	Joe Hisaishi	Won	
Mill Valley Film Festival	13 October 2013	Audience Favorite – Animation	The Wind Rises	Won	
Venice Film Festival	7 September 2013	Golden Lion	The Wind Rises	Nominated	

== See also ==
- The Kingdom of Dreams and Madness, a 2013 documentary about the making of the film.
- The Eternal Zero, a 2013 live-action drama film based on a novel of the same name that also features the Zero fighter plane
- Porco Rosso, a 1992 Ghibli animated film also directed by Miyazaki which contains a number of similar thematic elements.
- The Cockpit, a similar 1993 anime OVA focusing on World War II Axis allegiances, also featuring an emphasis on the warplanes.
- Grave of the Fireflies, another Ghibli anime film from 1988 covering the Japanese perspective on World War II and its effects on civilians.
