= Yuming Kanpai!! =

Compilation album by Yumi Matsutoya
- Released: December 20, 2023
- Length: 49:52
- Language: Japanese
- Label: EMI
- Producer: Ayase; Glim Spanky; Atsuo Katayama; Shigeru Kishida; Tetsuya Komuro; Nina Kraviz; Keisuke Kuwata; Yasuyuki Okamura; Rhymester; Ryuichi Sakamoto; Yorce

Yumi Matsutoya chronology
Yuming Banzai! (2022)	Yuming Kanpai!! (2023)	Warmhole / Yumi Aral (2025)

Singles from Yuming Kanpai!!
- 1. "Kissin' Christmas (Christmas Dakara Ja Nai) 2023" Released: November 27, 2023

Yuming Kanpai!! (Japanese: ユーミン乾杯!!; lit. 'Yuming Cheers!!') (Note: Fully written as Yuming Kanpai!!: Yumi Matsutoya 50th Anniversary Collaboration Best Album (Japanese: ユーミン乾杯!!~松任谷由実50周年記念コラボベストアルバム~, Hepburn: Yūmin Kanpai!! ~Matsutōya Yumi Gojū Shūnen Kinen Korabo Besuto Arubamu~)) is a collaborative compilation album by Japanese singer-songwriter Yumi Matsutoya, released through EMI Records on December 20, 2023, as a follow-up to her 2022 greatest hits album Yuming Banzai! to commemorate her 50th anniversary since her debut under the theme "a nostalgic future, a new past".

Personally selected by Matsutoya herself, Yuming Kanpai!! features guest appearances from Glim Spanky, Tetsuya Komuro, Nina Kraviz, Keisuke Kuwata, Nogizaka46, Kazumasa Oda, Yasuyuki Okamura, Quruli, Rhymester, Yoasobi, Yorce, and Kazuo Zeitsu. Commercially, the album peaked at number two on both the Oricon Albums Chart and the Billboard Japan Hot Albums and was certified gold by the Recording Industry Association of Japan (RIAJ).

== Background and release ==
On September 13, 2023, singer-songwriter Yumi Matsutoya held the public recording event, Yuming to Kanpai (ユーミンと乾杯!; lit. 'Cheers with Yuming'), in collaboration with her two hosted radio programs–Tokyo FM's Yuming Chord and JOLF's All Night Nippon Gold. At the event, she announced her upcoming collaborative compilation album, titled Yuming Kanpai!!, as the second and final installment of her 50th anniversary, following Yuming Banzai! (2022), along with the initial release date, November 29, 2023. Initially, the album was planned to release the same day as Yuming Banzai!.

On November 13, Matsutoya announced the album release would be postponed by a month, to December 20, due to the sudden decision to include new tracks, which are Nina Kraviz's remix of "Haru yo, Koi" and a duet with Keisuke Kuwata "Kissin' Christmas (Christmas Dakara Ja Nai) 2023". The DVD and Blu-ray contain Matsutoya reading handwritten letters aloud to thank the album's participating artists, and being interviewed about the album's creative processing in various places inspired her songs.

== Production and music ==
Yuming Kanpai!! explores the concept of "a new past, a nostalgic future", which all tracks feature artists Matsutoya personally selected—Glim Spanky, Tetsuya Komuro, Nina Kraviz, Keisuke Kuwata, Nogizaka46, Kazumasa Oda, Yasuyuki Okamura, Quruli, Rhymester, Yoasobi, Yorce, and Kazuo Zeitsu—and she allowed them to use multitrack recordings of her original songs to reinterprete the songs through their own interpretations.

"Kage ni Natte" with Okamura is a "groovy, city-pop-inspired, and innovative" and jazz-styled track with an increasing BPM. Yoasobi remade "Chūō Freeway" by adding futuristic sounds and new lyrics sourced from Matsutoya's biographical novel Subete no Koto wa Message Shōsetsu Yuming (2022) written by Mariko Yamauchi. Kraviz created an "elegant" and "ethereal" ambient techno on the remix of "Haru yo, Koi", reminiscent of "the '90's artists such as Aphex Twin and Autechre." Rhymester described their version of "Saturday Night Zombies" as background music for going out at night in the 80s. Quruli reharmonized, rearranged, and changed the chord progression of "Rondo". Glim Spanky added garage rock and psychedelic sounds on "Manatsu no Yoru no Yume".

== Promotion ==
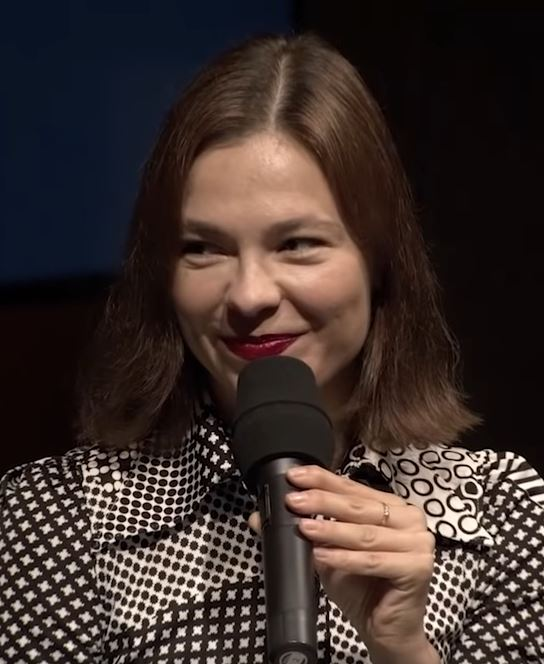
Nina Kraviz (pictured) remixed "Haru yo, Koi"

To support the album alongside Yuming Banzai!, Matsutoya embarked on her 50th-anniversary concert tour in Japan, titled the Journey. The tour began on May 13, 2023, at Pia Arena MM, Yokohama, and concluded on December 28 at Nippon Gaishi Hall, Nagoya. The tour comprised 54 shows and amessed 574,000 attendees. The special report of the tour was aired through The Weekly 99 Music on November 29. She premiered a collaboration with Yoasobi, "Chūō Freeway", on her radio shows Yuming Chord and All Night Nippon Gold on October 20.

The 2023 version of the duet by Matsutoya and Keisuke Kuwata, "Kissin' Christmas (Christmas Dakara Ja Nai)", was released as the album's lead single digitally on November 27, 2023, on CD single on December 20, concurrently with its parent album, and on 7-inch vinyl on February 14, 2024. A portion of the proceeds of the song was donated to the Save the Children Fund. Its special lyric video was uploaded via Kuwata's YouTube channel on December 21, depicting the singers and expressing the diverse forms of love of all ages and genders, including animals, by hugging and kissing.

Matsutoya performed "Mamotte Agetai", alongside Nogizaka46's members Shiori Kubo, Runa Hayashi, Nagi Inoue, Mao Ioki, Aruno Nakanishi, and Iroha Okuda at Best Artist 2023 on December 2. She and Kraviz appeared on the television special Parco 55th Anniversary Program: Yumi Matsutoya × Nina Kraviz, broadcast via Dommune on March 5, 2024, where Kraviz performed a DJ set incorporating the remix of "Haru yo, Koi". The song was later released along with "Acacia" as a charity single on May 29, 2024. All proceeds donated to Ishikawa Prefecture for the 2024 Noto Peninsula earthquake.

== Commercial performance ==
Upon its release, Yuming Kanpai!! debuted at number two on the Oricon Albums and Combined Albums Chart, selling 57,409 physical copies. The album also entered the Digital Albums Chart at number three, earning 1,468 digital sales. For Billboard Japan, Yuming Kanpai!! peaked at number two on the Hot Albums with 57,878 physical sales and 1,453 downloads. The album also reached number two on the Top Albums Sales and number three on the Download Albums. The Recording Industry Association of Japan (RIAJ) certified the album gold for surpassing 100,000 shipments in January 2024.

== Track listing ==
All tracks are written by Yumi Matsutoya, except where noted.

Yuming Kanpai!! track listing
No.	Title	Lyrics	Music	Arrangement	Length
1.	"Kage ni Natte" (影になって; with Yasuyuki Okamura)			Okamura	5:01
2.	"Chūō Freeway" (中央フリーウェイ; with Yoasobi)	Matsutoya; Ayase	Matsutoya; Ayase	Ayase	3:22
3.	"Kissin' Christmas (Christmas Dakara Ja Nai) 2023" (Kissin' Christmas (クリスマスだからじゃない) 2023; with Keisuke Kuwata)		Kuwata	Kuwata; Atsuo Katayama	7:01
4.	"Ima da kara" (今だから; with Kazumasa Oda and Kazuo Zeitsu)	Matsutoya; Oda; Zeitsu	Matsutoya; Oda; Zeitsu	Ryuichi Sakamoto	4:12
5.	"Haru yo, Koi" (春よ、来い; Nina Kraviz remix)			Kraviz	5:30
6.	"Saturday Night Zombies" (with Rhymester)	Matsutoya; Mummy-D; Utamaru	Matsutoya	Rhymester	5:20
7.	"Shinju no Pierce" (真珠のピアス; with Yorce)	Matsutoya; Greg Starr	Matsutoya; Starr	Yonce	5:36
8.	"Mamotte Agetai" (守ってあげたい; with Nogizaka46 and Tetsuya Komuro)			Komuro	4:54
9.	"Rondo" (輪舞曲(ロンド); with Quruli)			Shigeru Kishida	4:11
10.	"Manatsu no Yoru no Yume" (真夏の夜の夢; with Glim Spanky)			Glim Spanky	4:40
Total length:					49:52

Yuming Kanpai!! CD secret track
No.	Title	Lyrics	Music	Arrangement	Length
11.	"Ima da kara" (今だから; another version; with Kazumasa Oda, Kazuo Zeitsu)	Matsutoya; Oda; Zeitsu	Matsutoya; Oda; Zeitsu	Ryuichi Sakamoto	4:12
Total length:					54:04

DVD and Blu-ray bonus track
No.	Title	Length
1.	""'Yuming Henpai' Sanka Artist e: Yuming kara no Message" ("ユーミン返杯"参加アーティストへ~ユーミンからのメッセージ~)	42:12
Total length:		96:16

== Charts ==
=== Weekly charts ===
Weekly chart performance for Yuming Kanpai!!
Chart (2023)	Peak position
Japanese Albums (Oricon)	2
Japanese Combined Albums (Oricon)	2
Japanese Hot Albums (Billboard Japan)	2

=== Monthly charts ===
Monthly chart performance for Yuming Kanpai!!
Chart (2023)	Position
Japanese Albums (Oricon)	8

=== Year-end charts ===
2024 year-end chart performance for Yuming Kanpai!!
Chart (2024)	Position
Japanese Albums (Oricon)	59
Japanese Hot Albums (Billboard Japan)	63

== Certifications ==
Certifications for Yuming Kanpai!!
Region	Certification	Certified units/sales
Japan (RIAJ)	Gold	100,000^{^}
^{^} Shipments figures based on certification alone.

== Release history ==
Release dates and formats for Yuming Kanpai!!
Region	Date	Format	Version	Label	Ref.
Various	December 20, 2023	Digital download; streaming	Standard	EMI	
Japan	December 20, 2023	CD	Standard	EMI	
Japan	December 20, 2023	CD+DVD	Limited A	EMI	
Japan	December 20, 2023	CD+Blu-ray	Limited B	EMI	
