= Hi-Fi Set =

Japanese musical group (1974–1994)

Hi-Fi Set ハイ・ファイ・セット
- Origin: Japan
- Genres: Folk; New Music; Pops
- Years active: 1974–1994
- Labels: Alpha and Associates (1975-1978); Toshiba EMI (1978 -1983); CBS/Sony → CBS/SONY RECORDS → Sony Records (1984–1994)
- Past members: Junko Yamamoto; Toshihiko Yamamoto; Shigeru Okawa

Hi-Fi Set was a Japanese recording group formed in 1974, and later disbanded in 1994. The group's line-up consisted of Junko Yamamoto, Toshihiko Yamamoto and Shigeru Okawa.

== History ==
=== Early Years: Debut ===
In September 1974, the folk group known as Red Bird was disbanded due to creative differences. Later, former members of the group Junko Yamamoto (vocal guitar), Toshihiko Yamamoto (guitar), and Shigeru Okawa (bass) decided to form their own group known as Hi-Fi Set.

==== Breakthrough ====
Recording a new set of tracks, the group returned in 1975 with a Yumi Arai written song "Graduation Photo" which was released simultaneously with the group debut album of the same name in the same year. Throughout the year, the group re-recorded a series of Arai's song's who wrote for their album, songs such as "Cold Rain" and "Smile in the Morning Sun" which was later covered by Arai herself, these songs helped the group gain some momentum.

In 1977, Brazilian singer-songwriter Morris Albert's "Feelings" was covered by the group and it became an instant hit, the same year the group also made an appearance at the New Year annual TV special NHK Kōhaku Uta Gassen. Since then, with outstanding vocal work by Junko Yamamoto's soprano, Toshihiko Yamamoto's tenor, and Shigeru Okawa's bass voice, and an urban and sophisticated arrangement sound, the group became a very popular folk group during the heyday of new music in Japan.

During the early years in their careers, the quartet performed as opening acts for established artists of the time as the likes of Miwako Hiromatsu. The group also gained fame with hits such "My Beautiful Music" and "Sky Restaurant" which was sampled by American recording rapper J. Cole, these hit songs helped spur the group career and helped introduce them to a wider audience. In 1980, the group went into a hiatus but resumed a year later with their music, breaking a record by being the first act in Japanese music history to sing 4-beat jazz with Japanese composition.

In 1984, "I want to be honest" was released, the song became the group's most commercially successful song. With 26 single songs and 19 albums released throughout their active years as a group, In 1994 the group officially announced their disbandment and was later disbanded, going on their separate ways.

==== Disbandment: Aftermath ====
Throughout the years, Junko Yamamoto was active as a singer/songwriter.

After disbanding, Toshihiko Yamamoto continued his career as a music producer until his death on March 27, 2014.

In 1995, Shigeru Okawa was arrested for an attempted theft at a supermarket in Aoba-ku, Yokohama. However, he was not charged. Ever since the group's disbandment, he never returned to music again.

== Members ==
- Junko Yamamoto (b. December 30, 1949), was born in Tenkawa-mura, Yoshino-gun, Nara Prefecture.
- Toshihiko Yamamoto (February 23, 1947 – March 27, 2014), he was born in Osaka.
- Shigeru Okawa (b. September 6, 1945), was born in Mie Prefecture.

== Discography ==
=== Albums ===
Sheets	Release date	Title	Tracks
EMI Music Japan Toshiba EMI/ EXPRESS
1st	1975 February 5	Graduation Photo	1. OVERTURE; 2. AGES OF ROCK AND ROLL; 3. Graduation Photo; 4. Warmth of the chest 5. Between today and tomorrow 6. Big town 7. Museum #Tenmaru wooden horse 8. Fish and Chips; 9. Afternoon watching the sea 10. Ai no Hana Blooming Road
2nd	1976 June 5	Fashionable Lover	1. Star Stranger; 2. Chaoyang Smile inside 3. Juman Nui; 4. Farewell Party; 5. Cold Rain; 6. Fashionable Lover; 7. Desolate; 8. Midnight Remnants; 9. Moonlight; 10. Grand Canyon
3rd	1977 February 5	Love Collection	1. On Any Sunday; 2. Rain Station; 3. Sleepy Morning; 4. Dazzling You; 5. Night Scratch; 6. Crystal Night; 7. Love Fee Ring; 8. Hi-Fi Set Version "Feeling"; 9. Country Boy; 10. Dreaming Jamaica; 11. Central Freeway
4th	1977 September 5	THE DIARY	1. Love Diary; 2. Wind City; 3. Memo Random; 4. At the seaside summer resort 5. Love is everything 6. Marshmallow at the fireplace 7. Someday to the star 8. Personal message 9. Little Baroque
5th	1978 June 5	Swing	1. Swing; 2. Slightly detour 3. Firebird; 4. Hang glider in the evening sky 5. To the airport 6. Dawn; 7. Lady Gray; 8. Dance Dance Dance; 9. Oh Lucky Lady; 10. Let me go
6th	1978 November 20	Coming Up	1. Knockdown; 2. Shooting Star; 3. Midnight Angel; 4. Alone Christmas; 5. HAVANA CANDY; 6. Burbon Trip; 7. Monday Prologue; 8. Monochrome; 9. Night Sky South (WE ARE FLYING); 10. Winter Sea
7th	1979 July 5	Flash (Flash)	1. Two people along the line 2. Last spring vacation 3. School band girl 4. 22 Hour 15; 5. Rain Waltz and Rubbing You; 6. Slow Dance; 7. Kimagure Trump; 8. Night Long Distance Bus; 9. Spring Begins; 10. Singing
8th	1979 December 20	QUARTER REST	1. Dinner on Broadway; 2. Fluffy Melody; 3. Flying Down in the Green Town; 4. TWO IN THE PARTY; 5. Waiting for the Snowfall; 6. DESTINY; 7. Smiley Smile; 8. When May Comes; 9. CONCERT LANE; 10. PARTY IS OVER; 11. PS
9th	1981 June 21	3 NOTES	1. Dangerous Friendship; 2. Life is Jam Session; 3. LAST BALLAD, LAST COIN; 4. Boots And Sake and Wedding Dress; 5. I Love You Again; 6. Bop's clubhouse 7. Conceit Smile; 8. Flame-colored August; 9. Trio Koi SOUNDS; 10. starlight lullaby
10th	1982 April 1	1 & 2	1. BIG BRASS; 2. Hello MR.TELEPHONE; 3. Distant call from the past 4. Wow!; 5. Midnight Bye Bye-Show; 6. Long Good-bye
11th	1983 February 21	I miss you	1. Downtown LOVE Renaissance; 2. Kokoro Hanareru; 3. Blue Dream; 4. Lose but win 5. Season Off No Santaclaus Santa Claus; 6. Big Apple; 7. Sentimental Morning; 8. Catherine; 9. Indian Summer no Futari; 10. miss you
CBS Sony
12th	1984 February 25	PASADENA PARK	1. Light blue wagon 2. I want to be honest 3. I can't see it in the rain 4. July Christmas; 5. 1999; 6. Catherine on air 7. Magic Mountain Lady; 8. Viva! Off・ Loader; 9. Midnight TV; 10. Good-bye school days
13th	1985 February 25	INDIGO	1. Rainbow signal 2. Love madness 3. Boy friend 4. Champagne and Earth Movement Theory #Milky way 5. Star Makeup Halley; 6. Bloomin'blue; 7. Love Double fault 8. Demian; 9. Rainy Sentosa; 10. Star / Guidance / Night
14th	1986 April 10	SWEET LOCOMOTION	1. Rosy White; 2. Sweet Locomotion; 3. Do You Remember Me? Graph
15th	1987 April 1	Gibraltar	1. Ceramic Smile; 2. Time Table; 3. End of Affair; 4. Can Someone Dance?; 5. Summer Finale; 6. Secret Trip; 7. Via Arctic; 8. Paris Vision; 9. White Night; 10. Terminal Station
CBS / SONY RECORDS
16th	1988 March 21	Eyebrow	1. Platonic Shimasho; 2. Shadow Love; 3. Egg Benedict; 4. Slow Number; 5. Too hot day 6. NARITA; 7. Sabrina; 8. Cold Summer; 9. Pink Sand Dune; 10. Ferris
17th	1990 March 21	White Moon	1. Moon Highway; 2. Angels Fly; 3. Eternal Sunny Days; 4. Shall We Dance Again?; 5. Lover only tonight 6. Morning Flight; 7. Blue Lagoon; 8. Shoot the Moon; 9. Gloria; 10. Gift for Tomorrow
Sony Records
18th	1991 April 25	Get A Move On	1. I will never forget 2. Her lover 3. GENESIS LOVE; 4. Love roulette 5. Sincerely; 6. Shooting star island 7. ABC again 8. Long dream 9. Promised Land; 10. Tear of mother, smile of father
19th	1992 April 22	Tender Loving Care	1. Map; 2. All for You; 3. Decision; 4. Little May Sick; 5. Whereabouts

==== Singles ====
Sheets	Release date	Title	C / w
Toshiba EMI/ EXPRESS Alfa Records
1st	1975 February 5	Graduation Photo Lyrics: Yumi Arai; Composition: Yumi Arai; Arrangement: Katsuhisa Hattori	Museum; Lyrics: Shigeru Okawa; Composition: Toshihiko Yamamoto; Arrangement: Hiroshi Okazaki, Katsuhisa Hattori
2nd	1975 May 5	Age's of Rock and Roll; Lyrics: Kazue Ohashi; Composition: Kunihiko Murai; Arrangement:Matsutoya Masataka	Warmth of the chest Lyrics:Michio Yamagami; Composition: Kunihiko Murai; Arrangement: Katsuhisa Hattori
3rd	1975 July 5	I dream about it. Lyrics: Jack Fishman; Japanese lyrics:Michio Yamagami; Composition:Kunihiko Murai; Arrangement:Anita Kerr	Turmental); Composition:Kunihiko Murai; Arrangement:Anita Car
4th	1975 November 5	Sky Restaurant; Lyrics:Yumi Arai; Composition:Kunihiko Murai; Arrangement:Yumi Matsutoya	Come to Haneda on Saturday night Lyrics:Yumi Arai; Composition: Kunihiko Murai; Arrangement:Yumi Matsutoya
5th	1976 April 20	Cold Rain; Lyrics: Yumi Arai; Composition: Yumi Arai; Arrangement: Masataka Matsutoya	Fashionable Lover; Lyrics: Shigeru Okawa; Composition: Toshihiko Yamamoto; Arrangement: Masataka Matsutoya
6th	1976 March 6, 20	To be happy Lyrics: Yumi Arai; Composition: Kunihiko Murai; Arrangement: Yumi Matsutoya	Starry Midnight; Lyrics: Yumi Arai; Composition : Kunihiko Murai; Arrangement: Masataka Matsutoya
7th	1976 December 1	Feelings :Rei Nakanishi; Composer: Maurice Albert; Arrangement: Shinichi Tanabe	Another Dance; Lyrics: Shigeru Okawa; Composer: Toshihiko Yamamoto; Arrangement: Keitaro Miho
8th	1977 April 20	Wind Town : Shigeru Okawa ・ Takashi Matsumoto; Composer: Toshihiko Yamamoto; Arrangement: Ichizo Seo	Crystal Night; Lyrics: Shigeru Okawa; Composer: Yamamoto Toshihiko; Arrangement: Ichizo Seo
9th	1977 July 5	Memorandum; Lyrics: Rei Nakanishi; Composer: Yoichi Takizawa; Arrangement: Bob aleiver	Personal Message; Lyrics: Yu Aku; Composition: Ken Sato; Arrangement : Bob aleiver
10th	1977 October 20	Love Diary; Arrangement: Howard Greenfield < br/> Japanese lyrics: Tokiko Iwatani; Composer: Neil Sedaka; Arrangement: Bob aleiver	Love is everything Lyrics: Rei Nakanishi; Composer: Carole King; Arrangement: Bob aleiver
11th	1978 April 20	Just a little around the road Lyrics: Machiko Ryu ・ Rei Nakanishi; Composer: Tadao Inoue; Arrangement: Kentaro Haneda	Lady Gray; Lyrics: Machiko Ryu; Composer: Toshihiko Yamamoto; Arrangement: Kentaro Haneda
Toshiba EMI/ EXPRESS
12th	1978 August 20	Amerika Monogatari; Lyrics: Toyohisa Araki; Composer: Yuji Ohno; Arrangement: Yuji Ohno	Summer Separation; Lyrics: Shigeru Okawa; Composition: Shun Yamamoto Hiko; Arrangement:Hiroshi Shinkawa
13th	1978 November 5	Tropical Night; Lyrics: Shigeru Okawa; Composition: Toshihiko Yamamoto; Arrangement: Hiroshi Shinkawa; Arrangement by Strings: Shinichi Tanabe	Moeru Aki; Lyrics: Hiroyuki Itsuki; Composition: Toru Takemitsu; Arrangement: Shinichi Tanabe
14th	1979 May 20	Two people along the line Lyrics: Shigeru Okawa; Composition: Toshihiko Yamamoto; Arrangement: Shinkawa Hiroshi; Chorus Arrangement: Toshihiko Yamamoto	Monday's Prologue; Lyrics: Machiko Ryu; Composition: Ken Sato; Arrangement: Shinichi Tanabe; Chorus Arrangement: Junko Yamamoto
15th	1981 October 21	NOVEMBER RAIN; Lyrics: Shigeru Okawa; Composition: Toshihiko Yamamoto; Arrangement: Mitsuhiko Sato	BYE-BYE BOY; Lyrics: Shigeru Okawa; Composition: Toshihiko Yamamoto; Arrangement: Mitsuhiko Sato
16th	1982 March 3, 21	Hello MR.TELEPHONE; Lyrics: Shigeru Okawa; Composition: Toshihiko Yamamoto; Arrangement: Mitsuhiko Sato	AIR MAIL from home Lyrics: Shigeru Okawa; Composition: Toshihiko Yamamoto; Arrangement: Mitsuhiko Sato
17th	1982 October 21	miss you Lyrics: Shigeru Okawa; Composition: Toshihiko Yamamoto; Arrangement: Mitsuhiko Sato	Downtown Love Renaissance; Lyrics: Shigeru Okawa; Composition: Toshihiko Yamamoto; Arrangement : Mitsuhiko Sato
18th	1983 February 1	When i'm away from my heart Lyrics:Yoshitaka Minami< Arrangement: Mitsuhiko Sato	LAST BALLAD, LAST COIN When i'm away from my heart Lyrics: Shigeru Okawa; Composition: Toshihiko Yamamoto; Arrangement: Mitsuhiko Sato
19th	1983 Year April 5	Love story is about to come Lyrics: Shigeru Okawa; Composition: Yoshitaka Minami; Arrangement: Ichizo Seo	Blue Dream; Lyrics: Shigeru Okawa; Composition: Toshihiko Yamamoto; Arrangement: Mitsuhiko Sato
CBS Sony
20th	1984 January 21	I want to be honest DON'T YOU TELL HIM? Lyrics: Masamichi Sugi; Composition: Masamichi Sugi; Arrangement: Akira Inoue	Goodbye school days Lyrics: Shigeru Okawa; Composition: Akira Okamoto; Arrangement: Akira Inoue
21st	1984 May 21	Light Blue Wagon; Lyrics: Shun Taguchi; Composition: Toshihiko Yamamoto; Arrangement: Hiroshi Shinkawa; Chorus Arrangement: Toshihiko Yamamoto	Christmas in July; Lyrics: Shun Taguchi; Composition: Ginji Ito; Arrangement: Ryoichi Kuniyoshi; Chorus Arrangement: Toshihiko Yamamoto
22nd	1984 November 1	Star Makeup HalleyLyrics: Shun Taguchi; Composition: Masamichi Sugi; Arrangement: Akira Inoue; Chorus Arrangement: Toshihiko Yamamoto / Mari Sugi	Demian; Lyrics: Shun Taguchi; Composition: Yamamoto Toshihiko; Arrangement: Akira Inoue; Chorus Arrangement: Toshihiko Yamamoto
23rd	1985 February 5	Rainbow signal Lyrics: Aundai; Composition: Ginji Ito; Arrangement: Akira Inoue	Boy friend Lyrics: Ryo Koizumi; Composition: Masamichi Sugi; Arrangement: Akira Inoue
24th	1985 February 5 ]	Hitokire no Koi; Lyrics: Ryo Koizumi; Composition: Masamichi Sugi; Arrangement: Akira Inoue	Koi no Double fault Lyrics: Dai Aun; Composer: Toshihiko Yamamoto; Arrangement: Akira Inoue
CBS / SONY RECORDS
25th	1988 May 21	Platonic Shimasho; Lyrics: Shun Taguchi; Composition: Masamichi Sugi; Arrangement: Hiroshi Shinkawa	For the time being NARITA ANYWAY TO NARITA; Lyrics: Shigeru Okawa; Composer: Toshihiko Yamamoto; Arrangement: HEXAGON
26th	1989 December 1	Lover only tonight Lyrics: Shigeru Okawa; Composer: Toshihiko Yamamoto; Arrangement: Osamu Koike	Moon Highway; Lyrics: Shun Taguchi; Composer: Toshihiko Yamamoto; Arrangement: Hiroshi Shinkawa
27th	1990 March 1	Angels Fly ~ Angel's Season ~ Lyrics: Megumi Sato; Composition: Toshihiko Yamamoto; Arrangement: Hiroshi Shinkawa	Morning Flight; Lyrics: Megumi Sato; Composition: Toshihiko Yamamoto; Arrangement: Norimasa Yamazaki
Sony Records
28th	1991 April 25	I will never forget Lyrics: Kazumasa Oda; Composition: Kazumasa Oda; Arrangement: Kazumasa Oda	ABC again Lyrics: Shigeru Okawa; Composition: Toshihiko Yamamoto; Arrangement: Hiroshi Shinkawa

==== Live album ====
Sheet	Release date	Title	Recorded songs
ーニー-ミュージックレコーズ/CBS/SONY RECORDS
1st	1989 3/21	COLLECTION	Disc-1: 1. Light blue wagon 2. SWEET LOCOMOTION; 3. Graduation photos 4. Sky Restaurant; 5. Come to Haneda on Saturday night 6. Lady Grey; 7. NOVEMBER RAIN; 8. TWO IN THE PARTY; 9. 恋 恋の日記日記 (The Diary); 10. OH! LUCKY LADY; 11. Fairwell party 12. Good-bye School Days; Disc-2: 1. Feeling; 2. More than two people 3. Museum; 4. Downtown Love Renaissance; 5. Bop's Clubhouse; 6. DUKE ELINGTON MEDLEY; 7. Fish and chips 8. Fashion rubber 9. I want to be honest 10. DAY LIGHT; 11. Boy Friend

=== Videography ===
Sheet	Release date	Title
Sony Music Records/CBS・Sony
1st	1985	"'Rainbow Signal'"

=== Other songs/ Projects ===
Songs	Tie-up	Recorded works	Time of year
To be happy	Nippon TV series drama "Tanpopo (TV drama)#3 Series/Tanpopo" Theme song	Single "To be happy"	1976
Smiling in the Chaoyang	Theme song for the movie "Frozen River"	Album "Fashionable Lover"	1976
City of the Wind	Yamaha"Yamaha-Passol/Passol" CM image song	Single "City of the Wind"	1977
Firebird	Movie"/火の鳥"Theme song	Album "Coming Up"	1978
Amerika Monogatari	Japan Airlines"COME TO UNITED States/AMERICA '78" CM image song	Single "Amerika Monogatari"	1978
Burning autumn	Mitsukoshi・ -Toho collaboration work "Burning autumn" theme song	Single "Tropical Night"	1978
Night Sky to the SOUTH (WE ARE FLYING)	Morinaga Seika "High Crown" CM image song	Album "Swing"	1978
I Love You Again	Isetan CM song	Album "3 NOTES"	1981
Two of Indian Summer	Isetan Campaign Song	Album "I miss you"	1983
Love story from now on	Shiseido "Benefit" CM image song	Single "Love story is coming"	1983
Blue Dream	Employment Information Center CM Image Song		1983
I want to be honest	Citizen watch / Citizen "19-year-old Riviere" CF image song	Single "I want to be honest"	1984
Star Makeup Halley	Kanebo cosmetics Image song	Single "Star Makeup Halley"	1984
Let's Platonic	en:BVD/BVD CM image song	Single "Let's Platonic"	1988
Tonight Only Lover	Xebio Holdings/Victoria '90 WINTER Image song	Single "Tonight only lover"	1989
Moon Highway	HUMAX/HUMAX GROUP Radio CM song	Single "Tonight only lover"	1989
Angels Fly -Season of Angels〜	Hitachi Hitachi room air conditioner "White Kumakun" Image song	Single "Angels Fly 〜 Season of Angels"	1990
Eternal Sunny Days	Yamada Homes / Kobori Sumiten CM image song	Album "White Moon"	1990
A gift for tomorrow	Yomiuri TV Broadcast/Yomiuri TV-NTV Broadcasting Network/NTVsystem Morning drama series"Flower pearl" Theme song	Album "White Moon"	1990
I will not forget	TV Asahisystem "Tuesday Mystery Theater" Theme song	Single "I won't Forget"	1991
GENESIS LOVE	Shoko Chukin Bank/Shoko Chukin CM image song	Album "Get A Move On"	1991

=== Unreleased songs ===
- "Joy" – Toyota Motor Corporation- Toyota Carina/Carina CM song (lyric: Yu Akyu, composer: Yasuhiro Suzuki.1988)

== NHK Kohaku Uta Gassen participation history ==
Year/Broadcast	time	song	Order of appearances	Opponents
1977(Show 52)	28th	Feeling	First	Koichi Morita and Top Gallant

Notes

- The appearance order is expressed as "Appearance order / Number of contestants".
