= Benisuzume =

Studio album by Yumi Matsutoya
- Released: 5 March 1978
- Length: 40:35
- Language: Japanese
- Label: EMI Music Japan
- Producer: Masataka Matsutoya

Yumi Matsutoya chronology
14-banme no Tsuki (The 14th Moon) (1976)	Benisuzume (1978)	Ryūsenkei '80 (1978)

Benisuzume (Japanese: 紅雀, English: "Red Sparrow"), sometimes called Linnet / Beni Suzume, is the fifth studio album by Japanese singer-songwriter Yumi Matsutoya. It was released through EMI Music Japan on 5 March 1978.

== Background ==
This is the first album released after Matsutoya's marriage to Masataka Matsutoya and thus her first under the name Yumi Matsutoya (she had previously recorded under the name Yumi Arai). The album features Latin and South American musical influences.

== Track listing ==
All tracks are written by Yumi Matsutoya.

No.	Title	Length
1.	"The Lighthouse (9月には帰らない; Kugatsu Niwa Kaeranai)"	4:55
2.	"Erigeron Philadelphicus, Erigeron Annuus (ハルジョオン・ヒメジョオン)"	3:57
3.	"Without Me (私なしでも; Watashi Nashi Demo)"	3:16
4.	"Sentimental By the Mediterranean Sea (地中海の感傷; Chichukai No Kanshou)"	3:51
5.	"Linnet (紅雀; Beni Suzume)"	3:32
6.	"Crime and Punishment (罪と罰; Tsumi To Batsu)"	4:26
7.	"The Letter You'll Never Read (出さない手紙; Dasanai Tegami)"	4:12
8.	"Until the White Morning (白い朝まで; Shiroi Asa Made)"	3:17
9.	"Memories of the Laundry-Gate (ランドリーゲイトの想い出; Laundry-Gate No Omoide)" (also titled LAUNDRY-GATEの想い出)	5:30
10.	"Left Behind (残されたもの; Nokosareta Mono)"	3:35
Total length:		40:35

== Personnel ==
Credits adapted from the album's liner notes.

=== Musicians ===
- Yumi Matsutoya — lead vocals, chorus
- Masataka Matsutoya — keyboards, flat mandolin
- Tatsuo Hayashi — drums, syndrum
- Nobu Saito — percussion, tuning tom
- Kenji Takamizu, Haruomi Hosono — bass
- Shigeru Suzuki, Masaki Matsubara — electric guitar
- Ted M. Gibson — acoustic guitar
- Koji Hatori — trumpet, flugel horn
- Mitsuru Honda — trumpet, flugel horn
- Tokiichi Sugiyama — trumpet, flugel horn
- Kenji Nakazawa — trumpet, flugel horn
- Sumio Okada, Katsuyuki Sugimoto, Susumu Kazuhara, Yasuo Hirauchi — trombone
- Ryo Koyama, Eishige Yamada, Yuichi Tominari, Manabu Umeda — French horn
- Jake H. Concepcion — saxophone, clarinet, chorus
- Shunzo Sunahara — saxophone
- Ichiro Mimori — saxophone, flute
- Kiyoshi Saito — saxophone, flute
- Shigeo Suzuki — saxophone, flute
- Seiji Kuniyoshi, Mitsuru Soma — flute
- Hiroyuki Saka — oboe
- Hideo Koide, Takeru Koyama — kena
- David Rankin — chorus
- Junichi Hiiro, Eiji Shirai, Jo Watanabe, Masashi Shinozaki, Teiji Okubo, Shigeki Oshita, Toshiki Akiyama, Michiyo Toda, Nao Saito, Teruko Ogino — violin
- Katsuhiko Toyama, Toshio Yokoi — viola
- Masatoshi Maeda, Masashi Abe — cello
- Keiko Yamakawa — harp

=== Technical ===
- Masataka Matsutoya — producer
