= Rūju no Dengon =

1975 single by Yumi Matsutoya

Single by Yumi Arai

from the album Cobalt Hour
- B-side: "Nani mo Kikanaide"
- Released: February 20, 1975
- Genre: J-pop; Anime song
- Length: 6:14 (Side A & B)
- Label: Toshiba-EMI/Express; Alfa
- Producer: Kunihiko Murai

Yumi Arai singles chronology
"Jūnigatsu no Ame" (1974)	"Rūju no Dengon" (1975)	"Anohi ni Kaeritai" (1975)

"Rūju no Dengon" (ルージュの伝言, Lipstick Message, Message in Rouge, Rouge no Dengon) is the fifth single by the Japanese singer-songwriter Yumi Arai, released in February 1975. It was her first single to enter the Oricon Singles Chart.

== Overview ==
"Rūju no Dengon" is the lead single from the album Cobalt Hour. Its B-side, "Nani mo Kikanaide", was also included in the album. The meaning of the lyrics shows a girl's actions after finding out that her boyfriend cheated.

Tatsuro Yamashita, Minako Yoshida, Taeko Ohnuki participated on the chorus. Masataka Matsutoya, who was in charge of the arrangement, said, "The members of the tour band were asked to participate in the recording once in a while, and although it was OK, the quality of the performance was inferior to usual, so there was no response. After that, I added strings, but I felt that it was 60 points, so I thought that I could not make a record as it is. Then I came up with the idea of using Yamashita for the chorus. He had a connection with the chorus in the past.

Afterward, Yamashita gathered Yoshida, Ohnuki, and Kayo Ishū to make a chorus. Their collaboration gave the song a distinctly polished American pop sound. This demonstrates the significant influence Yamashita had on "Rūju no Dengon". As a result, he pioneered Yumi's pop singer line.

The song was used as the opening theme for the 1989 Ghibli film Kiki's Delivery Service. The ending theme of the movie was "Yasashisa ni Tsutsumareta Nara", which had been included on her 1974 studio album Misslim. The song also appeared in Makoto Shinkai's 2022 animated film Suzume as a reference to Kiki's Delivery Service.

== Track listing ==
Side A
No.	Title	Lyrics	Arrangement	Length
1.	"Rūju no Dengon [ルージュの伝言]"	Yumi Arai	Masataka Matsutoya	3:03

Side B
No.	Title	Lyrics	Arrangement	Length
1.	"Nani mo Kikanaide [何もきかないで]"	Yumi Arai	Masataka Matsutoya	3:11

== Chart positions ==
Year	Single	Country	Chart	Position	Sales
1975	Rūju no Dengon	Japan	Oricon Weekly Singles Chart	45	69,000

== Release history ==
Country	Date	Label	Format	Catalog number
Japan	February 20, 1975	Express	7" Single	ETP-20107
Japan	April 5, 1978	Express	7" Single	ETP-10386
Japan	December 21, 1989	Alfa	CD	09A3-23

== See also ==
- 1975 in Japanese music
