= Cobalt Hour =

COBALT HOUR

Studio album by Yumi Arai
- Released: June 20, 1975
- Recorded: March 1 – April 25, 1975
- Genre: J-pop
- Length: 36:26
- Label: Toshiba-EMI/Express; Alfa
- Producer: Kunihiko Murai, Shōrō Kawazoe

Yumi Arai chronology
MISSLIM (1974)	COBALT HOUR (1975)	Yuming Brand (1976)

Singles from COBALT HOUR
- 1. "Rūju no Dengon" Released: February 20, 1975

Cobalt Hour (コバルト・アワー, Kobaruto Awaa), stylized as COBALT HOUR, is Yumi Arai's third studio album, released on June 20, 1975 by Toshiba EMI/Express (now part of EMI Music Japan). The album was also distributed by Alfa Records for a period of time, as Alfa also held ancillary rights to this and the other LPs Arai released during the time Alfa was still a publishing company; those rights later reverted to EMI Japan in 1994-thereabouts, when EMI regained distribution of Alfa's catalogue except for the artists who were published by Alfa and were distributed by other labels (and later retained most of it, including Arai's first 4 LPs [whose rights she had managed to buy before Alfa was sold to Sony], while the rest, the catalogue from when Alfa was a recording label and the bulk of the catalogue from when it was a publishing company, went with Sony Music Entertainment, including session player Haruomi Hosono's future work both as a solo musician and as part of Yellow Magic Orchestra). On April 26, 2000, the recording was digitally remastered for re-release on CD by Bernie Grundman. Internet sales of the album began March 10, 2005.

The album cover was illustrated by Pater Sato. Though Arai's nickname "Yuming" is written on the cover, it is clear that the "g" was added later.

== Track list ==
Side A
No.	Title	Title translation	Length
1.	"COBALT HOUR"		3:33
2.	"Sotsugyō Shashin (卒業写真)"	Graduation Photograph	4:11
3.	"Hana Kikō (花紀行)"	Travelling Through Scattered Petals	2:48
4.	"Nani mo Kikanaide"	Don't Ask Me Anything	3:11
5.	"Rūju no Dengon (ルージュの伝言)"	Lipstick Message/Message in Rouge	3:03

Side B
No.	Title	Title translation	Length
1.	"Kōkai Nisshi (航海日誌)"	Logbook	4:48
2.	"CHINESE SOUP"		3:22
3.	"Sukoshi Dake Kataomoi (少しだけ片想い)"	I Love You More Than You Love Me/Just a Little Unrequited Love	3:17
4.	"Ame no Suteishon (雨のステイション)"	Rainy Station	5:14
5.	"Afurika e Ikitai (アフリカへ行きたい)"	Take Me To Africa	3:10

- Lyrics and arrangement by Yumi Arai, edited by Masataka Matsutoya.

== Performers ==
- Haruomi Hosono: electric bass
- Shigeru Suzuki: electric and acoustic guitar
- Tatsuo Hayashi: drums
- Masataka Matsutoya: piano, Fender guitar, Rhodes piano, clavinet, Moog synthesizer, Hammond organ
- Nobuo Saito: percussion
- Koichi Matsuda: harmonica
- Aisuke Matsutoya: fiddle
- Tadayuki Harada: baritone saxophone
- Teruyoshi Fukushima and Kunitoshi Shinohara: trumpet
- Eiji Arai and his fellows: trombone
- Yoshihisa Tamano and his fellows: strings
- Yasuhiro Yamada, Junji Hayakashi, Soma Mitsuru: flute
- Mikiko Imamichi: harp
- Hi-Fi Set, Minako Yoshida, Taeko Onuki, Tatsuro Yamashita, Kayoko Ishu: backing vocals

== Chart performance ==
=== Weekly charts ===
Year	Album	Country	Chart	Position	Weeks	Sales
1975	Cobalt Hour	Japan	Oricon Weekly LP Albums Chart	2	90	435,000
1975	Cobalt Hour	Japan	Oricon Weekly CT Albums Chart	12	44	27,000

=== Year-end charts ===
Year	Album	Country	Chart	Position	Sales
1975	Cobalt Hour	Japan	Oricon Yearly Albums Chart	31	93,000
1976	Cobalt Hour	Japan	Oricon Yearly Albums Chart	5	260,000

== See also ==
- 1975 in Japanese music
