= Reincarnation (Yumi Matsutoya album) =

Studio album by Yumi Matsutoya
- Released: 21 February 1983
- Studio: Onkio Haus, Cherry Island Studio
- Length: 46:06
- Language: Japanese
- Label: EMI Music Japan
- Producer: Masataka Matsutoya

Yumi Matsutoya chronology
| Pearl Pierce (1982) | Reincarnation (1983) | Voyager (1983) |

Reincarnation (stylized in all caps) is the fourteenth studio album by Japanese singer-songwriter Yumi Matsutoya, released 21 February 1983 by EMI Music Japan.

== Track listing ==
All tracks are written by Yumi Matsutoya.

| No. | Title | Length |
|---|---|---|
| 1. | "REINCARNATION" | 5:41 |
| 2. | "オールマイティー" | 4:24 |
| 3. | "NIGHT WALKER" | 5:04 |
| 4. | "星空の誘惑" | 4:48 |
| 5. | "川景色" | 3:34 |
| 6. | "ESPER" | 4:09 |
| 7. | "心のまま" | 4:45 |
| 8. | "ずっとそばに" | 4:27 |
| 9. | "ハートはもうつぶやかない" | 4:57 |
| 10. | "経る時" | 4:15 |
| Total length: | | 46:06 |

== Personnel ==
Credits adapted from the album's liner notes.

=== Musicians ===
- Vocals: Yumi Matsutoya
- Drums: Tatsuo Hayashi
- Bass: Kenji Takamizu
- Keyboards: Masataka Matsutoya
- Guitars: Masahiro Ando, Tsuyoshi Kon, Masaki Matsubara, Shigeru Suzuki
- Acoustic guitars: Ryusuke Seto and Chuei Yoshikawa
- Percussion: Shigetoya Hamaguchi, Nobu Saito, Pecker
- Saxophone and flute: Jake H. Concepcion
- Trumpet and flugel horn: Susumu Kazuhara
- Trombones: Eiji Arai
- Strings: Hiiro Group
- Background vocals: Buzz, Lilika, Leona, Clara, Jin Kirigaya, Toshihiro Kirigaya "Bobby", Kaoru Sudo, Fumiko Hiratsuka, Yumi Matsutoya

=== Technical and design ===
- Producer: Masataka Matsutoya
- Synthesizer programming: Keiji Urata
- Recording engineer: Masatsugu Yamazaki
- Assistance engineers: Tokanobu Arai, Tsuyoshi Inoue
- Mixing engineer: Masatsugu Yamazaki, Keishi Urata
- Directed by: Seiza Shimokobe, Hiroshi Ishibata
- Visual concept: Akira Kurada
- Art direction and design: Kazuo Yasuhara
- Photography: Norito Yoshimura
- Hair and make-up: Shinichi Nomura
- Styling: Sachiko Ito
- Leaflet portraits: Junichi Takahashi
