= Hikō-ki Gumo =

HIKŌ-KI GUMO

Studio album by Yumi Arai
- Released: November 20, 1973
- Genre: J-pop; new music; folk rock
- Length: 34:26
- Label: Toshiba-EMI/Express; Alfa Music
- Producer: Kunihiko Murai

Yumi Arai chronology
HIKŌ-KI GUMO (1973)	MISSLIM (1974)

Singles from HIKŌ-KI GUMO
- 1. "Henji wa Iranai" Released: July 5, 1972; 2. "Kitto Ieru" Released: November 5, 1973; 3. "Hikō-ki Gumo" Released: July 3, 2013

Hikō-ki Gumo (Japanese: ひこうき雲; English: "Vapour Trail"), stylized as HIKŌ-KI GUMO, is the debut studio album by Japanese singer-songwriter Yumi Arai, released in November 1973. The album is most known for its title (and lead-off) track.

== Overview ==
Before the album was released, the debut single "Henji wa Iranai" (which only sold 300 copies) along with her second single "Kitto Ieru" (B-side: "Hikō-ki Gumo") was released first. Both of the singles were included in this album.

"Hikō-ki Gumo" is a song originally written by Arai for Izumi Yukimura, the recording of the song was done but it was never released due to various reasons. It was instead Arai, who was 19 at the time, who first sang the song.

When Arai was in elementary school, she had a classmate who had a serious illness (muscular dystrophy). The boy would later die during his first year of high school. "Hikō-ki Gumo" is a song in which she mourns her friend who died at a young age and compares his life to a vapour trail. It is said that this was the inspiration for making this song.

Caramel Mama was the backing band for the album. Its members included Masataka Matsutoya, who would later be her husband, on keyboards; Haruomi Hosono on bass, Shigeru Suzuki on guitar and Tatsuo Hayashi on drums. Arai's voice was quivering all the time during the studio recordings, as a result, it took more than a year to complete the album.

The design for the album jacket was influenced by church music, and was designed to imitate the German classic label, Archiv Produktion. The illustration in the booklet is by Arai herself and contains the poem "Birthday" (誕生日), which describes the change from a girl to an adult. Along with it are the lyrics for the songs.

In 2013, it was announced that the song would be used as the theme for the Ghibli movie "The Wind Rises". At the same time, the album would get a reissue. The reissue's jacket features a Mitsubishi Zero, drawn by the studio, along with a white background. The booklet features all of the songs lyrics, together with the main visuals of the movie.

== Release history ==
Hikō-ki Gumo was released on November 20, 1973, by Toshiba-EMI/Express (now part of EMI Music Japan). The album was also distributed by Alfa Records for a period of time, as Alfa also held ancillary rights to this and the other LPs Arai released during the time Alfa was still a publishing company; those rights later reverted to EMI Japan in 1994-thereabouts, when EMI regained distribution of Alfa's catalogue except for the artists who were published by Alfa and were distributed by other labels (and later retained most of it, including Arai's first 4 LPs [whose rights she had managed to buy before Alfa was sold to Sony], while the rest, the catalogue from when Alfa was a recording label and the bulk of the catalogue from when it was a publishing company, went with Sony Music Entertainment, including session player Haruomi Hosono's future work both as a solo musician and as part of Yellow Magic Orchestra). On April 26, 2000, the recording was digitally remastered for re-release on CD by Bernie Grundman. Internet sales of the album began March 10, 2005.

== Track listing ==
Lyrics & Composition: Yumi Arai
Arrangements: Yumi Arai, Caramel Mama

Side 1
No.	Title	English translation	Length
1.	"Hikō-ki Gumo [ひこうき雲]"	Vapour Trail	3:26
2.	"Kumori Zora [曇り空]"	Cloudy Weather	3:02
3.	"Koi No Super Parachuter [恋のスーパー・パラシューター]"	Super Parachuter of Love	2:55
4.	"Sore To Umi No Kagayaki Ni Mukete [空と海の輝きに向けて]"	Toward The Sky and Gleaming Sea	4:14
5.	"Kitto Ieru [きっと言える]"	I Know I Can Tell You	2:55
Total length:			16:32

Side 2
No.	Title	English translation	Length
1.	"Berubetto Īsutā [ベルベット・イースター]"	Velvet Easter	3:45
2.	"Kami Hikō-ki [紙ヒコーキ]"	Paper Plane	2:46
3.	"Ame no Machi O [雨の街を]"	In the Rainy Town	4:20
4.	"Henji wa Iranai [返事はいらない]"	No Need to Reply	2:54
5.	"Sono Mama [そのまま]"	Don't Change	3:13
6.	"Hikō-ki Gumo [ひこうき雲] (Short Version)"	Vapour Trail	0:56
Total length:			17:54

== Personnel ==
- Piano – Yumi Arai
- Bass – Haruomi Hosono
- Keyboard – Masataka Matsutoya
- Guitar – Shigeru Suzuki
- Drum – Tatsuo Hayashi
- Nylon Strings Guitar – Haruomi Hosono (A-1, A-5)
- Percussion – Masataka Matsutoya (A-3), Shigeru Suzuki (A-3), Tatsuo Hayashi (A-3, A-5, B-4), Rei Ohara (B-4)
- Banjo – Masataka Matsutoya (B-5)
- Flute – Akira Miyazawa (A-2)
- Chorus – Masataka Matsutoya (A-2), Singers Three (A-3), Yumi Arai (B-4)
- Tenor sax – Konosuke Saijo (A-5)
- Steel Guitar – Hiroki Komazawa (B-2, B-5)

== Chart Positions ==
=== Weekly charts ===
Year	Album	Country	Chart	Position	Weeks	Sales
1973	HIKŌ-KI GUMO	Japan	Oricon Weekly LP Albums Chart	9	98	259,000
1976	HIKŌ-KI GUMO	Japan	Oricon Weekly CT Albums Chart	26	20	10,000

=== Year-end charts ===
Year	Album	Country	Chart	Position	Sales
1976	HIKŌ-KI GUMO	Japan	Oricon Yearly Albums Chart (top 50)	11	171,000

== See also ==
- 1973 in Japanese music
