= Misslim =

Studio album by Yumi Arai
- Released: October 5, 1974
- Recorded: June 15 – August 16, 1974
- Studio: ALFA Studio A
- Genres: J-pop; folk rock; new music; soul; funk
- Length: 36:09
- Labels: Toshiba-EMI/Express; Alfa
- Producers: Kunihiko Murai, Seizō Shimokōbe

Yumi Arai chronology
Hikō-ki Gumo (1973)	Misslim (1974)	Cobalt Hour (1975)

Singles from Misslim
- 1. "Yasashisa ni Tsutsumareta Nara" Released: April 20, 1974; 2. "Jūnigatsu no Ame" Released: October 5, 1974

Misslim (ミスリム, Misurimu), is the second studio album by Japanese singer-songwriter Yumi Arai, released in October 1974.

== Overview ==
The album title Misslim is derived from the word "Miss" and "Slim" after the slim appearance of Yumi Arai at that time. Its jacket cover was taken from Kajiko Kawazoe's house and the grand piano also belongs to her too. The dress Arai was wearing was from Yves Saint Laurent. Before the album was released, the lead single "Yasashisa ni Tsutsumareta Nara" was released first, the song would get re-recorded as part of this album (as would its b-side, "Mahō no Kagami"). The single version was included in her album Yuming Brand.

This was the first time that Tatsuro Yamashita collaborated with Yumi Arai as a chorus (arranger) for five years until her album Olive in 1979. In 1989, the album version of the song "Yasashisa ni Tsutsumareta Nara" was used as the ending theme for the Japanese release of Kiki's Delivery Service (it would later get reinstated for the 2010 rerelease of the English dub; it wasn't dubbed over for the 1990 JAL/Streamline dub). A cover of "Jūnigatsu no Ame", by Chay, was used as the opening theme for the NTV drama series Pretty Proofreader. A cover of "Yasashisa ni Tsutsumareta Nara", by Maaya Sakamoto, was used as the opening for the original Tamayura OVA series in 2010.

== Release history ==
Misslim was released in October 1974 by Toshiba-EMI/Express (now part of EMI Music Japan). The album was also distributed by Alfa Records for a period of time, as Alfa also held ancillary rights to this and the other LPs Arai released during the time Alfa was still a publishing company; those rights later reverted to EMI Japan in 1994-thereabouts, when EMI regained distribution of Alfa's catalogue except for the artists who were published by Alfa and were distributed by other labels (and later retained most of it, including Arai's first 4 LPs [whose rights she had managed to buy before Alfa was sold to Sony], while the rest, the catalogue from when Alfa was a recording label and the bulk of the catalogue from when it was a publishing company, went with Sony Music Entertainment, including session player Haruomi Hosono's future work both as a solo musician and as part of Yellow Magic Orchestra). On April 26, 2000, the recording was digitally remastered for re-release on CD by Bernie Grundman. Internet sales of the album began March 10, 2005.

== Track listing ==
Lyrics and composition: Yumi Arai
Arrangements: Masataka Matsutoya

Side 1
No.	Title	English translation	Length
1.	"Umareta Machi de" (生まれた街で)	On the Street of My Home Town	3:47
2.	"Hitomi o Tojite" (瞳を閉じて)	Message In a Bottle	3:09
3.	"Yasashisa ni Tsutsumareta Nara" (やさしさに包まれたなら)	Embraced in Softness	3:12
4.	"Umi o Miteita Gogo" (海を見ていた午後)	One Afternoon by the Sea	4:04
5.	"Jūnigatsu no Ame" (12月の雨)	December Rain	3:09
Total length:			17:18

Side 2
No.	Title	English translation	Length
1.	"Anata Dake no Mono" (あなただけのもの)	I'm All Yours	4:03
2.	"Mahō no Kagami" (魔法の鏡)	Magical Mirror	3:14
3.	"Tabun Anata wa Mukae ni Konai" (たぶんあなたはむかえに来ない)	You Left Me	4:31
4.	"Watashi no Françoise" (私のフランソワーズ)	Oh My Françoise	5:12
5.	"Tabidatsu Aki" (旅立つ秋)	Autumn Gone	3:07
Total length:			18:51

== Personnel ==
- Keyboards – Masataka Matsutoya
- Drum – Tatsuo Hayashi
- Bass guitar, cowbell – Haruomi Hosono
- Electric guitar – Shigeru Suzuki
- Percussion – Tatsuo Hayashi (A-1, A-2, A-4, B-1, B-3), Nobu Saito (A-1, B-1), Haruomi Hosono (A-1, A-5)
- Flat mandolin – Masataka Matsutoya
- Flute – Makio Shimizu (A-1)
- Acoustic guitar – Chuei Yoshikawa (A-2. A-3, A-5), Ryusuke Seto (B-5)
- 12-string guitar – Shigeru Suzuki (A-5), Ryusuke Seto (A-3, B-5)
- Pedal steel guitar – Hiroki Komazawa (A-3)
- Chorus – Yumi Arai (A-3), Sugar Babe (A-1, A-2, A-5, B-3), Minako Yoshida (A-1, B-1, B-3), Tatsuro Yamashita (B-1), Akiko Yano (B-1), Taeko Ohnuki (B-1)

== Chart positions ==
=== Weekly charts ===
Year	Country	Chart	Position	Weeks	Sales
1974	Japan	Oricon Weekly LP Albums Chart	8	102	268,000
1976	Japan	Oricon Weekly CT Albums Chart	21	12	7,000

=== Year-end charts ===
Year	Country	Chart	Position	Sales
1975	Japan	Oricon Yearly Albums Chart (top 50)	44	62,000
1976	Japan	Oricon Yearly Albums Chart (top 50)	14	156,000

== See also ==
- 1974 in Japanese music
