= Toki no Nai Hotel =

Studio album by Yumi Matsutoya
- Released: June 21, 1980
- Genre: Pop
- Length: 45:06
- Label: Toshiba-EMI/Express
- Producer: Masataka Matsutoya

Yumi Matsutoya chronology
Kanashii Hodo Otenki (1979)	Toki no Nai Hotel (1980)	Surf and Snow Volume One (1980)

Toki no Nai Hotel (Japanese: 時のないホテル, Toki no Nai Hoteru; English: "Hotels Without Time") is the ninth studio album by Japanese singer-songwriter Yumi Matsutoya, released in June 1980.

Pictures featured on the back and front sleeve art were taken at the Brown's Hotel in London. No songs were released as a single except "Tamerai", which first appeared as a B-side of the non-album track "Daydream", released in May 1980.

Like other studio albums which came out after she remained with EMI in 1977 when Alfa finally started operating as a record label, Toki no Nai Hotel was released on CD for the first time in 1985. The album was reissued in 1999, digitally remastered by Bernie Grundman.

== Track listing ==
All songs written and composed by Yumi Matsutoya, arranged by Masataka Matsutoya.

No.	Title	Length
1.	"Cecile no Shūmatsu (セシルの週末; Seshiru no Shūmatsu)"	5:26
2.	"Toki no Nai Hotel (時のないホテル; Toki no Nai Hoteru)"	4:15
3.	"Miss Lonely"	4:28
4.	"Ame ni Kieta Jogger (雨に消えたジョガー; Ame ni Kieta Jogā)"	5:00
5.	"Tamerai (ためらい)"	3:46
6.	"Yosoyuki Gao de (よそゆき顔で)"	4:30
7.	"5cm no Mukougishi (5cmの向こう岸; 5 Senchi no Mukougishi)"	6:22
8.	"Compartment (コンパートメント; Konpātomento)"	7:18
9.	"Mizu no Kage (水の影)"	4:02
Total length:		45:07

== Recorded versions ==
- "Mizu no Kage" was originally written for the female folk duo called Simons in 1978.
- "Tamerai" was originally written for Midori Hagio. The song was later covered by Yoshiko Miyazaki, Keiko Saito, and Pink Lady member Keiko Masuda.
- Queen's Fellows, a 2002 tribute album for Matsutoya includes two cover versions of the songs which were featured on Toki no Nai Hotel; "Cecile no Shumatsu" performed by Aiko and the title track by Takao Tajima.

== Personnel ==
- Masataka Matsutoya - keyboards
- Tatsuo Hayashi - drums
- Jun Aoyama - drums
- Yuichi Tokashiki - drums
- Nobu Saito - percussion
- Kenji Takamizu - bass guitar
- Tsugutoshi Goto - bass guitar
- Masaki Matsubara - electric guitar
- Shigeru Suzuki - electric guitar
- Tsuyoshi Kon - electric guitar
- Chuei Yoshikawa - acoustic guitar, mandolin
- Hiromi Yasuda - acoustic guitar
- Masamichi Sugi - backing vocals
- Kiyoshi Saito - saxophone
- Jake H Conception - saxophone
- Shunzo Sunabara - saxophone
- Yukio Eto - flute
- Eiju Yamada - horn
- Yasuhiro Okita- horn
- Tomato Strings Unsemble - strings
- Junichi Hiiro - violin
- Leona - backing vocals
- Clara - backing vocals
- Lilika - backing vocals
- Hideki Matsutake - synthesizer programming

== Chart position ==
Year	Country	Chart	Position	Weeks	Sales/shipments
1980	Japan	Oricon Weekly LP Albums Chart (top 100)	3	24	210,000+
1980	Japan	Oricon Weekly CT Albums Chart (top 100)	14	24	210,000+
