= Mamotte Agetai (Yumi Matsutoya song) =

Single by Yumi Matsutoya

from the album Sakuban Oaishimasho
- A-side: "Mamotte Agetai"
- B-side: "Grace Slick no Shōzō"
- Released: June 21, 1981
- Label: Express
- Songwriter: Yumi Matsutoya
- Producer: Masataka Matsutoya

Yumi Matsutoya singles chronology
"Hoshi no Roujulien" (1980)	"Mamotte Agetai" (1981)	"Yuyami o Hitori" (1981)

"Mamotte Agetai" (守ってあげたい, "I Want to Protect You") is a song by Japanese singer-songwriter Yumi Matsutoya and is contained in her studio album "Sakuban Oaishimasho". The song was released as her 17th single on June 21, 1981 from Toshiba EMI and sold over 695,000 copies. It was re-released as a CD single on June 28, 1989.

== Overview ==
Matsutoya was given the offer to write the theme song for the movie "Nerawareta Gakuen" and she wrote "Mamotte Agetai". The song was used as various TV dramas's the theme songs and CF songs afterwards. Grace Slick appearing in the title of the B-side "Grace Slick no Shōzō" (グレイス・スリックの肖像, "Portrait of Grace Slick") is Grace Slick of Jefferson Airplane.

== Track listing ==
=== Vinyl record ===
All tracks are written by Yumi Matsutoya, all music arranged by Masataka Matsutoya.

Side A
No.	Title	Length
1.	"Mamotte Agetai"	4:30

Side B
No.	Title	Length
1.	"Grace Slick no Shōzō"	4:28

== Credits and personnel ==
- Masaki Matsubara – electric guitars
- Ryuji Seto – acoustic guitars
- Masataka Matsutoya – keyboard instruments
- Kenji Takamizu – bass
- Eiji Shimamura – drums
- Nobu Saito – percussion instruments
- Keiji Urata – programming
- Tomato Strings – string section
- BUZZ – backing vocals

== Charts ==
Chart (1981)	Peak position
Oricon daily charts	2
Oricon weekly singles chart	2
Oricon monthly charts	
Oricon yearly charts	10
Music Labo weekly singles chart	1

The single spent 29 weeks in the Oricon chart.

== Cover versions ==
- Tomoyo Harada (1983)
- A.S.A.P (1990, Ajinomoto's Pal Sweet CF song)
- Chihiro Onitsuka (2002)
- Kumiko Iwai (2007, in her album "80'S Hit Parade Vol.1")
- Shutoku Mukai & Kazunobu Mineta (2009, the ending theme of the movie "Shonen Meriken Sack")
- ManaKana (2009, in their album "Futari Uta")
- Risa Niigaki & Eri Kamei from Morning Musume (2009, in their album "Chanpuru 1 ~Happy Marriage Song Cover Shū~")
- Sister Kaya (2009, in their album "Heartful Lovers")
- Himawari Kids (2010, in their album "Taisetsuna Tomodachi ni Okuru Uta")
- Kyoko Igarashi (CV=Atsumi Tanezaki) (2016, in "THE IDOLM@STER CINDERELLA MASTER Cute Jewelries! 003)

== See also ==
- 1981 in Japanese music
