= Yumi Matsutoya =

Japanese singer-songwriter (born 1954)

- Also known as: Yuming, Yumi Arai, Karuho Kureda
- Born: Yumi Arai; January 19, 1954 (age 72) Hachiōji, Tokyo, Japan
- Origin: Hachiōji, Tokyo, Japan
- Genres: Pop rock; jazz fusion; folk rock; kayōkyoku; city pop
- Occupations: Singer; songwriter; radio personality
- Instruments: Vocals, piano
- Years active: 1971–present
- Labels: Express; Alfa; Capitol; EMI
- Website: yuming.co.jp

Yumi Matsutoya (松任谷 由実, Matsutōya Yumi; born January 19, 1954), nicknamed Yuming (ユーミン, Yūmin), is a Japanese singer, composer, lyricist and pianist. Matsutoya often writes both the lyrics and the music to her songs, and is renowned for her idiosyncratic voice and live performances. She is one of the most prominent figures in the history of Japanese popular music.

Matsutoya's recording career has been commercially successful, with more than 42 million records sold. In 1990, her album The Gates of Heaven became the first album to be certified "2x million" by the RIAJ, and she has had twenty-one No. 1 albums listed on the Oricon charts. She is the only artist to have at least one number-one album every year on the Oricon charts for 18 consecutive years.

After gaining several years of experience as a session musician, she debuted as a singer-songwriter in 1972. During her early career, she worked under her maiden name Yumi Arai (荒井 由実, Arai Yumi). In 1975, Arai became known as a composer for "Ichigo Hakusho wo Mou Ichido", a commercially successful song recorded by the folk duo BanBan. She also gained popularity as a vocalist in the same year through the success of "Ano Hi ni Kaeritai", which became her first number-one hit on Japan's Oricon Charts. "Haru-yo, Koi" is another of her famous songs.

In The Encyclopedia of Contemporary Japanese Culture, it is written that "Yuming incorporated influences from progressive rock and European pop to produce a sophisticated, upper-middle-class female Japanese voice and sound in a contemporary musical and journalistic world dominated by discussions of folk music and social critique. This musical idiom is generally thought to have been first realised on [...] Cobalt Hour". The album The 14th Moon and the three albums that ranked in the top 10 of the Japanese charts in 1976 (Cobalt Hour, Yuming Brand, and Hikōki-gumo) "contained several songs which are considered to be early classics of the J-pop genre."

After marrying her musical collaborator Masataka Matsutoya in 1976, Arai began recording under her married name and has continued to do so. Throughout the 1980s, Matsutoya's music was prominently featured in advertisements for Mitsubishi Motors in her native Japan and her image was used to promote their vehicles. In addition to multiple hit singles, she has obtained enormous commercial success on the Japanese Albums Chart, particularly during the late 1980s and the first half of the 1990s.

== Early life ==
Yumi Arai was born in 1954 in Hachiōji, Tokyo. She had three brothers and one sister, and her family ran a draper shop called Arai Gofukuten, established in 1912. When she was a junior high school student, she used to go to an Italian restaurant called Chianti, which had opened in 1960. In those days, many celebrities went to the restaurant; Akira Kurosawa, Yukio Mishima, Kōbō Abe, Seiji Ozawa, Ryu Murakami, Taro Okamoto, Kishin Shinoyama, and Hiroshi "Monsieur" Kamayatsu, who eventually became her first record producer. Alfa Music, the publishing company to which she belonged early in her career (later to become a full-fledged record label in 1977), was founded by people who were regular customers at Chianti.

The nickname "Yuming" was given to Matsutoya by Sy Chen (シー・ユー・チェン), a Chinese bassist she had a crush on when she was 13 years old. At the age of 14, Matsutoya worked as a studio musician for the first time and also began writing original songs. When she was 17 years old, her first original song titled "Ai wa Totsuzen ni" was released. It was sung by Katsumi Kahashi, the former guitarist in the 1960s Japanese band The Tigers.

In April 1972, Arai entered Tama Art University. At the same time, she signed with then-publishing company Alfa as a music artist. At first, she wanted to be a songwriter. However, the founder of the publishing company, Kunihiko Murai, encouraged her to work as a singer-songwriter.

== Career ==
=== Early career; works as Yumi Arai ===
On July 5, 1972, Arai released her debut single "Henji wa Iranai". It was produced by Hiroshi "Monsieur" Kamayatsu, the former vocalist of The Spiders. Released by Toshiba EMI, the label to which she would be affiliated and release all her albums throughout her career, under its Liberty sublabel (with Alfa acting as publishing company), her first single sold only 300 copies. (It would later feature in re-recorded form on her debut LP, Hikō-ki Gumo.)

She recorded her first full album, Hikō-ki Gumo, with the band Caramel Mama, better known as Tin Pan Alley, which consisted of Haruomi Hosono, Shigeru Suzuki, Tateo Hayashi and Masataka Matsutoya, and it was released by Toshiba EMI under its Express sublabel in November 1973; the title track (and lead-off track) was later used as the theme song for the movie The Wind Rises (2013). For her next album, MISSLIM, (1974), Masataka Matsutoya, who was the keyboardist of Tin Pan Alley, arranged all of her songs. Her third studio album, Cobalt Hour (1975), features her early famous song "Sotsugyō Shashin". The same year, it was covered by the chorus group Hi-Fi Set (who also performed on the original song) on their first album with the same name. That cover version also succeeded as a single. In later years, it was covered by many Japanese artists and became one of Japan's classic pop songs. The same year, the male folk duo BangBang recorded her song "Ichigo Hakusho o Mou Ichido" and reached number one on the Oricon chart. Because of the commercial success of other artists, she became famous as a songwriter.

Yumi achieved moderate success with her fifth single, Rouge no Dengon ("Message in Lipstick"), an up-tempo song considered to be a proto J-Pop classic. She gained a television appearance singing this song with the top Japanese girl group of the time, Candies, and the song has been covered by a number of artists over the years.

Her first top hit as a singer-songwriter was her sixth single "Ano Hi ni Kaeritai". In August 1975, it was used as the theme song for the TBS TV drama Katei no Himitsu. Two months later, it was released as a single and reached the top of the Oricon chart. The 14th Moon (1976), her final album as Yumi Arai, featured Leland Sklar on bass and Mike Baird on drums. Since this album, Masataka Matsutoya has produced all her albums himself. She considers her nickname "Yuming" to also mean the name of the union with her husband. Following the success with "Ano Hi ni Kaeritai", it became her first album to reach number one on the Oricon chart. Besides, in the end of the year chart in 1976, three of her albums (Cobalt Hour, Yuming Brand, and Hikō-ki Gumo) ranked in the top 10. Four years after her debut, she dominated the Japanese album charts. This astonishing record has never been broken by anyone since.

In 1989, her fifth single, "Rouge no Dengon" (from her third album), and third single, "Yasashisa ni Tsutsumaretanara" (the version used was from her second album), were featured as the theme songs of the film Kiki's Delivery Service. Nowadays, those tunes are known as her early notable songs. Some of her songs were deeply influenced by many American and European musicians, such as Joni Mitchell and Carole King. As a pioneering singer-songwriter who mixed Western culture and Japanese pop, she left a strong impression on Japanese popular music.

=== Works as Yumi Matsutoya ===
After marrying Masataka Matsutoya on November 29, 1976, she had considered retirement. But eventually she decided to continue to work as a musician, performing under her married name. In 1978, her memorable first album as Yumi Matsutoya, entitled Benisuzume was released. In the late 1970s and early 80s, she released two albums every year. However, those albums were less successful than the ones she released when she was single. Nevertheless, she wrote several of her well-known songs during those years, and her albums reached the top 10 on the Oricon chart.

Before the release of Benisuzume, a compilation named Album was released by Toshiba EMI. It mainly contained songs she had released as Yumi Arai, and two songs released as singles only. Matsutoya didn't want to release this compilation; in her autobiography released in 1982, she writes about this album and calls it "The biggest stain on my music career." Because of this, she never allowed the release of another compilation album until 1998. However, her ex-record-label-and-publishing-company Alfa Records had, after 1977 (when Alfa finally established itself as an independent record label), released many compilations which consisted of her old tunes without her permission. Hence, in the late 1990s, she bought the copyrights of all her songs that she had written under her maiden name; helping in this decision was the fact that Toshiba EMI had by then regained control, in 1994, of the Alfa catalogue, including the albums released by Toshiba EMI while Alfa was still a publishing company, thus her early catalogue being spared of Alfa's 2001 sale to Sony after Alfa faced financial difficulties.

Her tenth album, Surf and Snow (1980), changed the negative tide for her. When the album was released, it did not sell as well as others had previously. However, in 1987, "Koibito ga Santa Claus" became popular as the theme song for the hit movie Take Me out to the Snowland (私をスキーに連れてって, Watashi wo Ski ni Tsuretette). The album eventually sold over 400,000 copies. In 1981, she returned to the top of Japanese pop music. Her husband wrote the score for the movie Nerawareta Gakuen, which was directed by Nobuhiko Obayashi and distributed by Kadokawa Pictures. She wrote "Mamotte Agetai" as the theme song for the movie. The single of this song reached number two on Oricon and sold nearly 700,000 copies. Following the success of the single, her eleventh album Sakuban Oaishimasho (1981) became her second number one album. From that year through 1997, 17 consecutive studio albums she released reached number one on the Oricon charts.

Ian Martin of The Japan Times wrote in 2016, "At the same time she was contributing to Matsuda's record-breaking run of No. 1 hit singles, Matsutoya's own work retained an almost militant focus on albums, and the balance she struck between commercial success and artistic integrity is a source of inspiration to many aspiring musicians."

In 1982, she published an autobiography, Rouge no Dengon. In this book, she wrote about her life in an exaggerated style. She contemplated doing the artwork on her own albums. The artwork of the album Sakuban Oaishimasho (1981) was designed by Hipgnosis, and the video Compartment was produced by Storm Thorgerson, Aubrey Powell and Peter Christopherson. A logo design from the latter film also became the logo of "Yuming", and was used as the cover of the 1984 album No Side. Aubrey Powell and Richard Evans of Hipgnosis also designed the cover of the 1983 album "Voyager". Since the 1970s, she has also been famous as an artist who performs in concerts using gorgeous and novel sets. She used elaborate visual technology on the stage and it is said that they cost over a hundred million yen. She has released two live albums and several videos. In 1986, she released her first live album, Yuming Visualive DA-DI-DA,. It was released on CD and cassette tape only, and it became one of the rarest items among her fans for many years.

=== Commercial peak and decline ===
In the late 1980s and early 1990s, her albums consisted of mechanical sounds which featured synclavier. In addition, they were recorded by a lot of famous West Coast musicians. However, in later years, Masataka Matsutoya, her record producer and husband, regretted the cheap rhythm section on those albums. Before the Diamond Dust Fades.... (1987) sold more than any of her albums at that time. In the late 1980s, her record sales increased. Delight Slight Light KISS (1988) became the first million-selling record for her. From this album in 1995 to the album Kathmandu, she released eight studio albums and all of them sold over million copies. Above all, two of those albums, The Gates of Heaven (1990), and The Dancing Sun (1994), sold over double-million copies. The former is the first double million-selling album in Japan. Dawn Purple (1991) sold over a million copies in one week after the album's release. Her record sales were appraised by the Japanese music industry. Before the Diamond Dust Fades... won Japan Record Awards of 1988 and The Gates of Heaven won a Japanese gold disc grand prix of 1991.

The Gates of Heaven and several of her albums in those years reflected an optimistic atmosphere in Japan caused by the asset price bubble around the end of the 1980s and early 1990s. She was often called "Charisma of Youth" or "The Enthusiastic Leader of Love" in those days. After hearing from her record company Toshiba-EMI that single sales were quickly overtaking album sales due to a slowing economy, Matsutoya decided to make a difference. To make people buy the album, she did not release any physical singles at all for about four years in the early 1990s, although she did promote songs from her albums to radio as "album cuts". Her albums The Gates of Heaven (1990), Dawn Purple (1991) and Tears And Reasons (1992) performed very well on the Oricon charts, boosted partially by airplay. However, in autumn 1993, she released "Manatsu no Yo no Yume", the first physical single in four years since "Anniversary", already known as the theme song of the TV drama Dare nimo Ienai. It sold over 1,400,000 copies and became the 89th best-selling single in Japan. It is her most successful single.

The next year, she produced the two-million-selling singles called "Hello, My Friend" and "Haru-yo, Koi". Both of these singles were used in TV dramas (the former was featured on Kimi to Ita Natsu, the latter was used on the same titled program broadcast by NHK). The latter in particular is famous as one of her standard numbers. Those songs were also included on the album The Dancing Sun, which became her second double million-selling album on the strength of those popular tunes. That same year, the equity ratio of her record company (which was originally established by Toshiba Corporation in 1960 as Toshiba Musical Industries, and then renamed Toshiba-EMI when Toshiba sold 50% of the company to the British EMI Group in 1973) was changed, with EMI now owning a 55% stake in the company, while Toshiba owned the remaining 45% stake in the company.

She was interested in the spiritual world for many years, and this preference was often represented in her songs, a tendency that became deeper in the 1990s.

In August 1996, about twenty years after her marriage, Yumi Matsutoya came back as Yumi Arai and performed three days at Nakano Sunplaza, Tokyo. Excerpts of that live recording were released on video and CD. A month before the live performances, a newly recorded version of her early standard song, "Machibuse" (she did not sing it herself), was released as a single. Until 1995, she had released studio albums every year, but her popularity began to decline around 1996. After her twenty-ninth studio album, The Waves of Zuvuya, (1997) her record sale declined more and more.

As "Yumi Matsutoya", she had not released any compilation albums since 1977. Formerly, she didn't want to release compilation albums. However, in 1998, she released a double album compilation, Neue Musik: Yumi Matsutoya Complete Best Vol. 1. It included 28 songs and two new songs recorded with the former members of Tin-Pan-Alley. In addition, several songs of this album were selected by votes by her fans. At this stage, it is her biggest-selling and final four million-selling album.

=== Recent years ===
After the release of her well-sold compilation album, she declared that she would make the music she wants to. From 1999 on, she has released eight studio albums.

On June 30, 2007, Toshiba Corporation sold its remaining 45% stake in Matsutoya's record label to EMI and gave EMI full ownership of the company. The label's name was then changed from Toshiba-EMI to EMI Music Japan to reflect Toshiba's divestiture from the business. In September 2012, the British EMI group was broken up and sold to various companies. On April 1, 2013, EMI Music Japan was absorbed into Universal Music Japan, became defunct as a company and was renamed to EMI Records Japan. Therefore, all of Matsutoya's further releases will be through Universal Music Japan.

In 2013, it was announced that Matsutoya's song Hikouki Gumo, would be used as the closing theme to the Studio Ghibli film The Wind Rises (Kaze Tachinu).

She wrote the theme song for the Japanese release of The Little Prince, titled "Kidzukazu Sugita Hatsukoi."

In 2019, the magazine Shūkan Gendai ranked Matsutoya third (behind only Miyuki Nakajima and Masayoshi Son) in a list of the smartest Japanese figures that was determined based on the criteria of "intelligence, determination, sensibility and capability".

==== AI Yumi Arai ====
Sometime between 2020 and 2021, she and her husband had re-discovered an unreleased song on a multitrack recording audiotape brought to them from a warehouse by a member of their production staff; the song, estimated to have been composed by her and arranged by him sometime between the late 1970s and early 1980s based on her singing style and his sound style, "felt oddly fresh" and was deemed by the couple to be "impossible to recreate in the present day". Learning about a research team at the University of Tokyo's Graduate School of Information Science and Technology, which was studying voice sampling and melody creation assisted by artificial intelligence, they submitted the song to such team, led by assistant professor Shinnosuke Takamichi (who conducted voice research at the School's Saruwatari-Koyama Laboratory), to see if her old voice could be sampled and transformed into new melodies; although the result was vaguely similar to what the Matsutoyas had envisioned, they revealed that parts of it were used to create the song "Call me back", released in September 2022 and dubbed as a collaboration between Yumi Matsutoya and "AI Yumi Arai".

==== Yumi AraI ====
A few years later, the couple discovered the singing synthesis software Synthesizer V Studio by Tokyo-based company Dreamtonics Co., Ltd. and realized that its deep-learning capabilities and the progress undertaken by Takamichi's research could now allow them to make better use out of AI Yumi Arai's origin voice samples for a future collaboration album. They devised a production process they named the "Chrono Recording System", where Yuming's present voice would be strategically paired with the output of a Synthesizer V version of "AI Yumi Arai" to create songs that "travel between the past and the present" while still retaining her regular present voice as the main focus. This process was announced by Masataka Matsutoya in February 2025 to be used in the production of her then-untitled 40th studio album, projected to be released later in the fall.

On July 24, the title for the new studio album was unveiled as Wormhole, and the release date was slated for October 29. It was also revealed that the artist name for this album would be "Yumi AraI", an alphabetized version of Yuming's pre-marriage name where the first letter "A" and the last letter "I" from her maiden surname were capitalized to highlight "AI" for "artificial intelligence".

=== Awards and honors ===
Matsutoya was decorated with the Medal of Honor with Purple Ribbon in the 2013 spring honors list, released on April 29. The medal is in recognition of artistic, academic or athletic contributions.

== Production works ==
=== Songwriter ===
As a songwriter and lyricist, Yumi Matsutoya wrote hundreds of songs for Hi-Fi Set, Asami Kobayashi, Kenji Sawada, Hiromi Gō, Toshihiko Tahara, Reimy and many other artists. Some of them went on to become hits, such as "Ichigo Hakusho o Mou Ichido" (performed by BangBang in 1975) and "Machibuse" (performed by Seiko Miki and Hitomi Ishikawa in 1976). Many of her hit tunes were sung by idol singer Seiko Matsuda. Several songs sung by Matsuda reached number one on the Oricon singles chart, including "Akai Sweet Pea", "Nagisa no Balcony" (1982) and "Hitomi wa Diamond" (1986). These singles are some of Matsuda's best-known songs. Matsutoya has collaborated with many songwriters and lyricists, among them Yosui Inoue, Takashi Matsumoto, Kōki Mitani, Kunihiko Kase, Shizuka Ijuin. She also co-wrote the Japanese lyrics to the Lynsey de Paul and Barry Blue penned song Sugar Shuffle with Asami Kobayashi, which appeared on Kobayashi's Cryptograph album in 1984. When she writes songs for other musicians, she often uses the pseudonym Kureda Karuho (呉田軽穂). It is a parody on the name of Greta Garbo.

=== Collaboration with other artists ===
On her early albums, several famous 1970s Japanese singer-songwriters who had not yet succeeded at that time sang as the backing vocalists; Tatsuro Yamashita, Taeko Onuki, Akiko Yano and Minako Yoshida. Yamashita usually arranged the chorus parts of her songs in the '70s. But in later years, he criticized her late 1980s music career in his own song called "Queen of Hype Blues". In her career spanning more than 30 years, Matsutoya has sung duets with many singers; including Takao Kisugi, Toshinobu Kubota, Masumi Okada, and Takao Tajima.

She has also recorded several collaboration singles with other musicians. In 1985, she released the song "Imadakara" with Kazumasa Oda and Kazuo Zaitsu. It was mostly composed by Oda and Matsutoya, arranged by Ryuichi Sakamoto and played by former Sadistic Mika Band members. At the live event performed in June the same year, having added Matsutoya as vocalist, the band reunited as "Sadistic Yuming Band" and performed this song.

In 1986, Matsutoya co-wrote "Kissin' Christmas", a theme song for a TV program, with Keisuke Kuwata, the leader of Southern All Stars. Appearing only on TV, this song was a collaboration by two of the most successful Japanese songwriters. However, the song has never been released on any format.

In 1992, Matsutoya and Karl Smokey Ishii cooperated for the single "Ai no Wave". She wrote it and the B-Side "Roman no Dengon" with him. The same year, Ishii had released "Kimi ga Irudake de", the fifth best-selling single in Japan. Therefore, the single climbed to the top of the hit parade naturally. The title of "Roman no Gengon" was self-parody of their songs; it was named under Matsutoya's "Rouge no Dengon" and Kome Kome Club's "Roman Hikou".

When her popularity quickly declined at the end of the 1990s, she recorded a song with the popular group Pocket Biscuits. They collaborated on the single "Millennium" in 2000, but it did not achieve the expected success.

In 2002, she penned the song "Koi no Signal" for the group Coming Century, a sub-unit of the popular boyband V6. Compared to other Coming Century songs of the time, the lyrics for the song were more heartfelt and optimistic.

In 2005, Matsutoya formed the group called "Yumi Matsutoya and Friends of Love the Earth" with four East Asian artists; Dick Lee from Singapore, Lim Hyung Joo from South Korea, amin and Xu Ke from China. Matsutoya wrote the song "Smile Again" for the new group, and it was released on iTMS only. When Matsutoya appeared at the Expo 2005 concert in September of the same year, they appeared as guests and sang this song. On New Year's Eve the same year, they appeared in the Japanese traditional annual TV music program Kohaku Uta Gassen, and performed "Smile Again". The next year, Matsutoya re-recorded the song and released it on her album A Girl in Summer. In autumn of 2006, this unit added more members. They had only one concert and released the new single "Knockin' at the Door" on CD.

In 2006, she wrote a song "Still Crazy for You" for Crazy Cats, a Japanese comedy team popular in the late 1950s and 1960s, and sang a duet with the vocalist Kei Tani. It was released as the group's first new single since 1986, and climbed to No. 14 on the Oricon chart. It was the highest chart position they have ever reached.

In 2012 Yumi came to London to record "A Whiter Shade of Pale" with Procol Harum, a band she considered an inspiration for her work. She sang a duet with Gary Brooker on this new version of the 1967 classic, which featured three verses and a guitar solo by Geoff Whitehorn. Yumi and Procol Harum then played a series of December concerts in major Japanese cities, one of which was recorded for a later television showing.

== Discography ==
=== Studio albums ===
- Hikō-ki Gumo (1973) (credited to "Yumi Arai")
- Misslim (1974) (credited to "Yumi Arai")
- Cobalt Hour (1975) (credited to "Yumi Arai")
- 14-banme no Tsuki (The 14th Moon) (1976) (credited to "Yumi Arai")
- Benisuzume (1978)
- Ryūsenkei '80 (1978)
- Olive (1979)
- Kanashii Hodo Otenki (The Gallery in My Heart) (1979)
- Toki no Nai Hotel (1980)
- Surf and Snow Volume One (1980)
- Mizu no Naka no Asia e (1981)
- Sakuban Oaishimashō (1981)
- Pearl Pierce (1982)
- Reincarnation (1983)
- Voyager (1983)
- No Side (1984)
- Da-Di-Da (1985)
- Alarm à la mode (1986)
- Diamond Dust ga Kienumani (Before the Diamond Dust Fades...) (1987)
- Delight Slight Light Kiss (1988)
- Love Wars (1989)
- Tengoku no Door (The Gates of Heaven) (1990)
- Dawn Purple (1991)
- Tears and Reasons (1992)
- U-miz (1993)
- The Dancing Sun (1994)
- Kathmandu (1995)
- Cowgirl Dreamin' (1997)
- Suyua no Nami (The Wave of Zuvuya) (1997)
- Frozen Roses (1999)
- Acacia (2001)
- Wings of Winter, Shades of Summer (2002)
- Yuming Compositions: Faces (2003)
- Viva! 6×7 (2004)
- A Girl in Summer (2006)
- Soshite Mouichido Yumemiru Darou (And I Will Dream Again...) (2009)
- Road Show (2011)
- Pop Classico (2013)
- Uchū Toshokan (Universal Library) (2016)
- Shinkai no Machi (2020)
- Wormhole (2025) (credited to "Yumi AraI")

== Reception ==
In a 2006 survey of people between 10 and 49 years of age in Japan, Oricon Style found the number one selling song "Valentine's Radio" (1,606,780 copies) to be the third most popular Valentine's Day song in Japan. The most popular song was Sayuri Kokushō's 1986 debut single "Valentine Kiss", which sold only 317,000 copies. The other songs in the top five were (in order) "Love Love Love" from Dreams Come True (2,488,630 copies), "Happy Happy Greeting" from the Kinki Kids (608,790 copies), and "My Funny Valentine" by Miles Davis.

== Honours ==
- Medal with Purple Ribbon (2013)
- Person of Cultural Merit (2022)

== See also ==
- List of best-selling music artists in Japan
