= Masataka Matsutoya =

Masataka Matsutoya 松任谷 正隆
- Also known as: Manta (マンタ); OK Matsutoya; Yūmin Master (遊眠亭主); Yūmin Papa (ユーミンパパ); U.Kon
- Born: November 19, 1951 (age 74); Tokyo, Japan
- Genre: J-pop
- Occupations: Keyboardist; Composer; Arranger; Record producer Automobile critic
- Instruments: Piano, organ, Hammond organ, electronic keyboard, accordion, guitar, bass, banjo, mandolin
- Years active: 1971—present

Masataka Matsutoya (松任谷 正隆, Matsutōya Masataka; born November 19, 1951) is a Japanese arranger, composer, music producer, and motor journalist. He currently resides in Setagaya, Tokyo. He is a graduate of Keio Senior High School and Keio University (literature department). His wife is singer-songwriter, composer, and lyricist Yumi Matsutoya (née Arai). His mother, Kazuko, is the auditor of Kirarasha, the firm Masataka established after his marriage to Arai.

== Biography ==
- In 1971, he participated as a background musician in Takuro Yoshida's album, "Ningen nante." He began to frequently perform with Yoshida as the keyboard player in other albums and live performances, and also began his first work with arrangement.
- In 1973, he formed the group "Caramel Mama" with fellow musicians Haruomi Hosono, Shigeru Suzuki, and Tateo Hayashi. This group later evolved into a group named "Tin Pan Alley".
- On November 29, 1976, he married Yumi Arai, who became Yumi Matsutoya.
- In 1982, he won first prize for arrangement at the FNS Music Festival television program.
- In 1986, he founded and headed the "Mica Music Laboratory."
- In 1987, he co-produced Yumi Matsutoya's "Diamond Dust" concert tour.
- In 2004, he appeared on the annual Kōhaku Uta Gassen television show as the guest piano accompanist for Yuzu.
- In 2005, he received the 34th Best Dressed Award (Academic and Cultural Category).
- In 2007, he served as the overall director for *YUMING SPECTACLE SHANGRILA III ~A DREAM OF DOLPHINE~*, collaborating with Russia's State Great Moscow Circus. For this achievement, she was awarded the Lomonosov Medal by the Russian Academy of National Security on July 23.
- On October 1, 2009, he was appointed visiting professor at the Faculty of Media Studies, Tokyo University of Technology.
- In 2010, she produced “The Gardenia Hills Okinawa.”
- In October 2010, he was appointed visiting professor at the Faculty of Art, Kyoto University of the Arts.
- In 2014, he received the 9th Susumu Watanabe Award.
- In 2014, he appeared as a guest pianist on the 65th NHK Kōhaku Uta Gassen, performing “Woman” (from “W's Tragedy”) with Hiroko Yakushimaru.
- In 2019, he joined the reunited band “SKYE” following a recording session with actor Shiro Sano.
- In 2021, he made his major-label debut with “SKYE” upon the release of their album.
- Matsutoya is known as an avid car maniac, especially the French Peugeot. He is currently in possession of several cars, including the Land Rover Defender, Peugeot 1007, BMV 130i M-Sport. He served as the host for TV Asahi's "CAR GRAPHIC TV" program, and was formerly a part of the jury that chose the Car of the Year Japan.

== Notable songs and arrangements ==
- Agnes Chan – "Mittsu no douka" "Yasashisa shirazu" (song & arrangement) "Again" "Ame no iro" "Goodnight Miss Lonely" (arrangement)
- Yukiko Okada – "Oshare na Amamoto" "Anata wo wasureru mahou ga areba" "Ryusei no takahara" "Jyugatsu no ningyo" (song & arrangement) "Kachouzu" "Kanashii yokan" "Summer Beach" "Sweet Planet" "Stripe no jealousy" "Bien" "Futari dake no ceremony" "Futari no blue train" "Penalty" "Hoshi to yoru no koibitotachi" "Pop-up riseennu" "Mizuiro princess -mizu no sei-" "Mizuumi" "Me wo samashite, Darling" "Mori no fairy" "Love Fair" "Lady Joker" "Ryusei no takahara" "Lonesome season." (arrangement)
- Ami Ozaki – "Uwasa no otoko" "Oikakete kitakeredo" "Kage no machi" "Kaze no naka" "Guuzen" "Sayonara wo iu tame ni" "Sunlight" "Taiyo no hitorigoto" "Tabi" "Tooku no hikari ga....." "Todokanai haru" "Tomarigi" "Namida no ame" "Bye Bye Mr. Random" "Hatsukoi no toori ame" "Booming Cracker" "Fuyu no poster" "My pure lady" "Meisou" "Yumeko to kagerou" "Watashi wa naniiro" "Watashi wo yonde" (arrangement)
- Meiko Kaji – "Toritomemonai omoi" "Fushigine" (arrangement)
- Takao Kisugi – "Sparking Head" "Collage" (arrangement)
- Yoshino Kimura – "Ashita wa..." "Amenohi wa futaride" "Girl" "Christmas eve wa nakanaide" "Koisuru nichiyoubi" "Calling in the rain" "Sweetest Song" "Soratobu jitensha" "Mysterious Woman" "Like a Dolphin" "Lullaby For Grandmother ~Kiiroi bara wo anata e~" (lyrics song arrangement) "Golden Town" (song & arrangement)
- Kyōko Koizumi – "Kyoukai no mae de" "Nudist" (arrangement)
- Yuki Saito – "Seishun" (arrangement)
- Miyuki Nakajima – "Awase kagami" "B.G.M." "Yakyoku" "Yuujou" (arrangement)
- Tomoyo Harada – "Zutto sobani" "Dandelion ~Osozaki no tampopo" "Toki wo kakeru shoujo" "Mamotteagetai" (arrangement)
- Hikaru Genji – "Gin no kaze" "Namida no kagayaki" (song)
- Hirahara Ayaka – "Banka (Hitori No Kisetsu)" (arrangement)
- Seiko Matsuda – "Akai sweet pea" "Aoi photograph" ""Garasu no Prism" "Komugiiro no mermaid" "Seifuku" "Nagisa no balcony" "Hitomi wa diamond" "Himitsu no Hanazono" "Pink no Mozart" "Bon Voyage" "Madorasu check no koibito" "Rock'n Rouge" (arrangement)
- Tomokazu Miura – "Illusion" "Sasayaki game" "Nagisa meguri" "Usugure" "Furimukeba ai" "Hohoemi no tobira" (arrangement)
- Yumi Morio – "Kinou anata wo futtanowa" "Gomennasai aishiteru" "Dan dan jealousy" "Chotto France" "Yume china doll" (arrangement)
- Yumi Matsutoya - "Haru yo, koi" (arrangement)
- Hiroko Yakushimaru – "Woman~'W no higeki' yori" "Kaguya no sato" "Kanashimi no tane" "Kantsubaki, saita" "Fuyu no bara" "Murasaki no hanabi" "Rose tea wa ikaga?" (arrangement)
- Yuzu – "Eikou no kakehashi" "Going Home" "Sakuragichou" (arrangement)
- Takuro Yoshida – "Ashita no mae ni" "Asu ni mukatte hashire" "Eiyu" "Kakurenbo" "Kaze no machi" "Kanashii no wa" "Kimi no machi ni ikuyo" "Gozen reiji no machi" "Summer people" "Suteki na no wa yoru" "Tsumetai ame ga futteiru" "Doushite konnani kanashiin darou" "Tonarinomachi no ojousan" "Nagareru" "Hitotsu no dekigoto" "Hitori omoeba" "Hakuya" "Boku no kuruma" "Mai hime" "Marude dairiseki no youni" "Mizunashigawa" "Mudai" "Wagami kawaiku" "Wagaya" (arrangement)
- Reimy – "Ai ni Desperate" "Omoide yori tashikani..." "Kagami no meiro" "Kaze wa asu e" "Kanashimi no bus journey" "Kimi no tomodachi de itaikara" "Carry On" "Kiriame de mienai" "Koi no ichijikan wa kodoku no sennen" "Kokusaisen" "Kogoeru kokoro" "Zansho" "Sugu sobani iruno" "Seishun no regret" "Sora ga ichimenkai ni mieta hi" "Time Travelers" "Datte" "Toki no meguriai" "Donna fu ni" "Nanimo iranaikara" "Niji no asa kaze no sora" "No side" "Hanabira no mau sakamichi" "Pansie to topaz no necklace" "Hitochigai" "Hoshi no climber" "Ponytail" "Mommy Hurricane" "Mayonaka no symphony" "Ring!" (arrangement)

== Style ==
Matsutoya's arrangements often involve classical string and woodwind instruments. He was one of the first composers to use these instruments in j-pop arrangements. His style is most distinct in his usage of the flute and harp. He also frequently uses choruses in arrangements, and many artists have made their debuts in the back-chorus of Yumi Matsutoya's songs.

Several Japanese arrangers show influence from Matsutoya in their arrangements.
