= 1971 in Japanese music =

In 1971 (Shōwa 46), Japanese music was released on records, and there were charts, awards, contests and festivals.

During that year, Japan continued to have the second largest music industry in the world.

== Awards, contests and festivals ==
The 14th Osaka International Festival (Japanese: 大阪国際フェスティバル) was held from 13 April to 28 April 1971. Hakone Aphrodite began on 6 August 1971. The 3rd All Japan Folk Jamboree began on 7 August 1971. The 3rd contest of what subsequently became known as the Yamaha Popular Song Contest was held on 9 October 1971. The final of the 2nd World Popular Song Festival was held on 27 November 1971. The 13th Japan Record Awards were held on 31 December 1971. The 22nd NHK Kōhaku Uta Gassen was held on 31 December 1971.

The 20th Otaka prize was won by Sadao Bekku.

== Concerts ==
The first Haru Ichiban concert was held in 1971.

== Number one singles ==
Oricon

The following reached number 1 on the weekly Oricon Singles Chart:

Issue date	Song	Artist(s)
4 January	"Hashire Kōtarō"	Salty Sugar
11 January	"As the Years Go By"; Japanese title: "Kiri no Naka no Futari" (霧の中の二人; lit. "Two in the Fog")	Mashmakhan
18 January	"As the Years Go By"; Japanese title: "Kiri no Naka no Futari" (霧の中の二人; lit. "Two in the Fog")	Mashmakhan
25 January	"Bōkyō"	Shinichi Mori
1 February	"Bōkyō"	Shinichi Mori
8 February	"Bōkyō"	Shinichi Mori
15 February	"Hanayome"	Norihiko Hashida & Climax
22 February	"Hanayome"	Norihiko Hashida & Climax
1 March	"Shiretoko Ryojō"	Tokiko Kato
8 March	"Shiretoko Ryojō"	Tokiko Kato
15 March	"Shiretoko Ryojō"	Tokiko Kato
22 March	"Shiretoko Ryojō"	Tokiko Kato
29 March	"Shiretoko Ryojō"	Tokiko Kato
5 April	"Shiretoko Ryojō"	Tokiko Kato
12 April	"Shiretoko Ryojō"	Tokiko Kato
19 April	"Naomi no Yume" (original: "I Dream of Naomi")	Hedva & David
26 April	"Naomi no Yume" (original: "I Dream of Naomi")	Hedva & David
3 May	"Naomi no Yume" (original: "I Dream of Naomi")	Hedva & David
10 May	"Naomi no Yume" (original: "I Dream of Naomi")	Hedva & David
17 May	"Mata Au Hi Made"	Kiyohiko Ozaki
24 May	"Mata Au Hi Made"	Kiyohiko Ozaki
31 May	"Mata Au Hi Made"	Kiyohiko Ozaki
7 June	"Mata Au Hi Made"	Kiyohiko Ozaki
14 June	"Mata Au Hi Made"	Kiyohiko Ozaki
21 June	"Mata Au Hi Made"	Kiyohiko Ozaki
28 June	"Mata Au Hi Made"	Kiyohiko Ozaki
5 July	"Mata Au Hi Made"	Kiyohiko Ozaki
12 July	"Mata Au Hi Made"	Kiyohiko Ozaki
19 July	"Yokohama Tasogare"	Hiroshi Itsuki
26 July	"Watashi no Jōkamachi"	Rumiko Koyanagi
2 August	"Watashi no Jōkamachi"	Rumiko Koyanagi
9 August	"Watashi no Jōkamachi"	Rumiko Koyanagi
16 August	"Watashi no Jōkamachi"	Rumiko Koyanagi
23 August	"Watashi no Jōkamachi"	Rumiko Koyanagi
30 August	"Watashi no Jōkamachi"	Rumiko Koyanagi
6 September	"Watashi no Jōkamachi"	Rumiko Koyanagi
13 September	"Watashi no Jōkamachi"	Rumiko Koyanagi
20 September	"Watashi no Jōkamachi"	Rumiko Koyanagi
27 September	"Watashi no Jōkamachi"	Rumiko Koyanagi
4 October	"Watashi no Jōkamachi"	Rumiko Koyanagi
11 October	"Watashi no Jōkamachi"	Rumiko Koyanagi
18 October	"Ame no Ballad"	Masayuki Yuhara
25 October	"Ame no Ballad"	Masayuki Yuhara
1 November	"Ame no Ballad"	Masayuki Yuhara
8 November	"Ame no Midōsuji"	Ouyang Fei Fei
15 November	"Ame no Midōsuji"	Ouyang Fei Fei
22 November	"Ame no Midōsuji"	Ouyang Fei Fei
29 November	"Ame no Midōsuji"	Ouyang Fei Fei
6 December	"Ame no Midōsuji"	Ouyang Fei Fei
13 December	"Ame no Midōsuji"	Ouyang Fei Fei
20 December	"Ame no Midōsuji"	Ouyang Fei Fei
27 December	"Ame no Midōsuji"	Ouyang Fei Fei

Cash Box

The following reached number 1 on the Cash Box singles chart:

- 2 January, 9 January and 16 January: Kyoto no Koi - Yuko Nagisa
- 23 January: Hashire Kōtarō - Salty Sugar
- 30 January: As the Years Go By - Mashmakhan
- 6 February: Daishoobu (Japanese: 大勝負) - Kiyoko Suizenji
- 13 February: Kyoto Bojoo - Yuko Nagisa
- 20 February and 27 February: Bōkyō - Shinichi Mori
- 13 March, 20 March, 1 May, 8 May, 15 May and 29 May: Shiretoko Ryojō - Tokiko Kato
- 5 June, 12 June, 19 June, 26 June, 17 July and 24 July: Mata Au Hi Made - Kiyohiko Ozaki
- 31 July: Yokohama Tasogare - Hiroshi Itsuki
- 7 August, 21 August, 28 August, 4 September, 18 September, 25 September, 2 October, 9 October and 23 October: Watashi no Jōkamachi - Rumiko Koyanagi
- 14 August: Saraba Koibito - Masaaki Sakai
- 30 October, 6 November, 13 November and 20 November: Ame no Ballad - Masayuki Yuhara
- 27 November, 4 December, 11 December, 18 December: Ame no Midōsuji - Ouyang Fei Fei

== Number one albums and LPs ==
Cash Box

The following reached number 1 on the Cash Box LPs chart:

- 24 July: Kiyohiko Ozaki First Album (Japanese: 尾崎紀世彦ファースト・アルバム) - Kiyohiko Ozaki
- 21 August, 28 August, 18 September and 25 September: Mata Au Hi Made Kiyohiko Ozaki Second Album - Kiyohiko Ozaki

Oricon

== Annual charts ==
Rumiko Koyanagi's Watashi no Jōkamachi was number 1 in the Cash Box annual singles chart, and the Oricon annual singles chart. Tokiko Kato's Shiretoko Ryojo was number 1 in the annual singles chart published in Billboard.

== Film and television ==
The music of Inn of Evil and Silence and The Ceremony, all by Tōru Takemitsu, won the 26th Mainichi Film Award for Best Music. The first broadcast of Star Tanjō! was on 3 October 1971.

== Gagaku ==
A Gagaku revival was reported.

== Debuts ==
Saori Minami, Mari Amachi and Rumiko Koyanagi debuted in 1971.

== Other singles released ==
- 17-sai by Saori Minami
- 5 February: Children Who Don't Know War by Jiros
- 1 November: Kimi Wo Nosete by Kenji Sawada

== Other albums released ==
- Kazemachi Roman by Happy End
- Satori by Flower Travellin' Band
- 20 November: Ningen Nante by Takuro Yoshida

== See also ==
- Timeline of Japanese music
- 1971 in Japan
- 1971 in music
- w:ja:1971年の音楽
