= List of Oricon number-one singles of 1971 =

The highest-selling singles in Japan are ranked in the Oricon Singles Chart, which is published by Oricon Style magazine. The data are compiled by Oricon based on each singles' physical sales. This list includes the singles that reached the number one place on that chart in 1971.

== Oricon Weekly Singles Chart ==
Issue date	Song	Artist(s)	Ref.
January 4	"Hashire Kōtarō"	Salty Sugar	
January 11	"As the Years Go By"; Japanese title: "Kiri no Naka no Futari" (霧の中の二人; lit. "Two in the Fog")	Mashmakhan	
January 18	"As the Years Go By"; Japanese title: "Kiri no Naka no Futari" (霧の中の二人; lit. "Two in the Fog")	Mashmakhan	
January 25	"Bōkyō"	Shinichi Mori	
February 1	"Bōkyō"	Shinichi Mori	
February 8	"Bōkyō"	Shinichi Mori	
February 15	"Hanayome"	Norihiko Hashida & Climax	
February 22	"Hanayome"	Norihiko Hashida & Climax	
March 1	"Shiretoko Ryojō"	Tokiko Kato	
March 8	"Shiretoko Ryojō"	Tokiko Kato	
March 15	"Shiretoko Ryojō"	Tokiko Kato	
March 22	"Shiretoko Ryojō"	Tokiko Kato	
March 29	"Shiretoko Ryojō"	Tokiko Kato	
April 5	"Shiretoko Ryojō"	Tokiko Kato	
April 12	"Shiretoko Ryojō"	Tokiko Kato	
April 19	"Naomi no Yume" (original: "I Dream of Naomi")	Hedva & David	
April 26	"Naomi no Yume" (original: "I Dream of Naomi")	Hedva & David	
May 3	"Naomi no Yume" (original: "I Dream of Naomi")	Hedva & David	
May 10	"Naomi no Yume" (original: "I Dream of Naomi")	Hedva & David	
May 17	"Mata Au Hi Made"	Kiyohiko Ozaki	
May 24	"Mata Au Hi Made"	Kiyohiko Ozaki	
May 31	"Mata Au Hi Made"	Kiyohiko Ozaki	
June 7	"Mata Au Hi Made"	Kiyohiko Ozaki	
June 14	"Mata Au Hi Made"	Kiyohiko Ozaki	
June 21	"Mata Au Hi Made"	Kiyohiko Ozaki	
June 28	"Mata Au Hi Made"	Kiyohiko Ozaki	
July 5	"Mata Au Hi Made"	Kiyohiko Ozaki	
July 12	"Mata Au Hi Made"	Kiyohiko Ozaki	
July 19	"Yokohama Tasogare"	Hiroshi Itsuki	
July 26	"Watashi no Jōkamachi"	Rumiko Koyanagi	
August 2	"Watashi no Jōkamachi"	Rumiko Koyanagi	
August 9	"Watashi no Jōkamachi"	Rumiko Koyanagi	
August 16	"Watashi no Jōkamachi"	Rumiko Koyanagi	
August 23	"Watashi no Jōkamachi"	Rumiko Koyanagi	
August 30	"Watashi no Jōkamachi"	Rumiko Koyanagi	
September 6	"Watashi no Jōkamachi"	Rumiko Koyanagi	
September 13	"Watashi no Jōkamachi"	Rumiko Koyanagi	
September 20	"Watashi no Jōkamachi"	Rumiko Koyanagi	
September 27	"Watashi no Jōkamachi"	Rumiko Koyanagi	
October 4	"Watashi no Jōkamachi"	Rumiko Koyanagi	
October 11	"Watashi no Jōkamachi"	Rumiko Koyanagi	
October 18	"Ame no Ballad"	Masayuki Yuhara	
October 25	"Ame no Ballad"	Masayuki Yuhara	
November 1	"Ame no Ballad"	Masayuki Yuhara	
November 8	"Ame no Midōsuji"	Ouyang Fei Fei	
November 15	"Ame no Midōsuji"	Ouyang Fei Fei	
November 22	"Ame no Midōsuji"	Ouyang Fei Fei	
November 29	"Ame no Midōsuji"	Ouyang Fei Fei	
December 6	"Ame no Midōsuji"	Ouyang Fei Fei	
December 13	"Ame no Midōsuji"	Ouyang Fei Fei	
December 20	"Ame no Midōsuji"	Ouyang Fei Fei	
December 27	"Ame no Midōsuji"	Ouyang Fei Fei	

== See also ==
- 1971 in Japanese music
