= 13th Japan Record Awards =

1971 Japanese music awards ceremony

- Date: 31 December 1971
- Venue: Imperial Garden Theater, Tokyo
- Hosted by: Keizo Takahashi, Yoko Yamamoto

Television/radio coverage
- Network: TBS

The 13th Annual Japan Record Awards took place at the Imperial Garden Theater in Chiyoda, Tokyo, on 31 December 1971, starting at 7:00PM JST. The primary ceremonies were televised in Japan on TBS.

== Award winners ==
Japan Record Award

- Kiyohiko Ozaki for "Mata Au Hi Made"
  - Lyricist: Yū Aku
  - Composer: Kyōhei Tsutsumi
  - Arranger: Kyōhei Tsutsumi
  - Record Company: Philips Records/Nippon Phonogram

Best Vocalist

- Shinichi Mori for "Ofukurosan"
  - Awarded again after 2 years, 2nd best vocalist award.

Best New Artist

- Rumiko Koyanagi for "Watashi No Jyoukamachi"

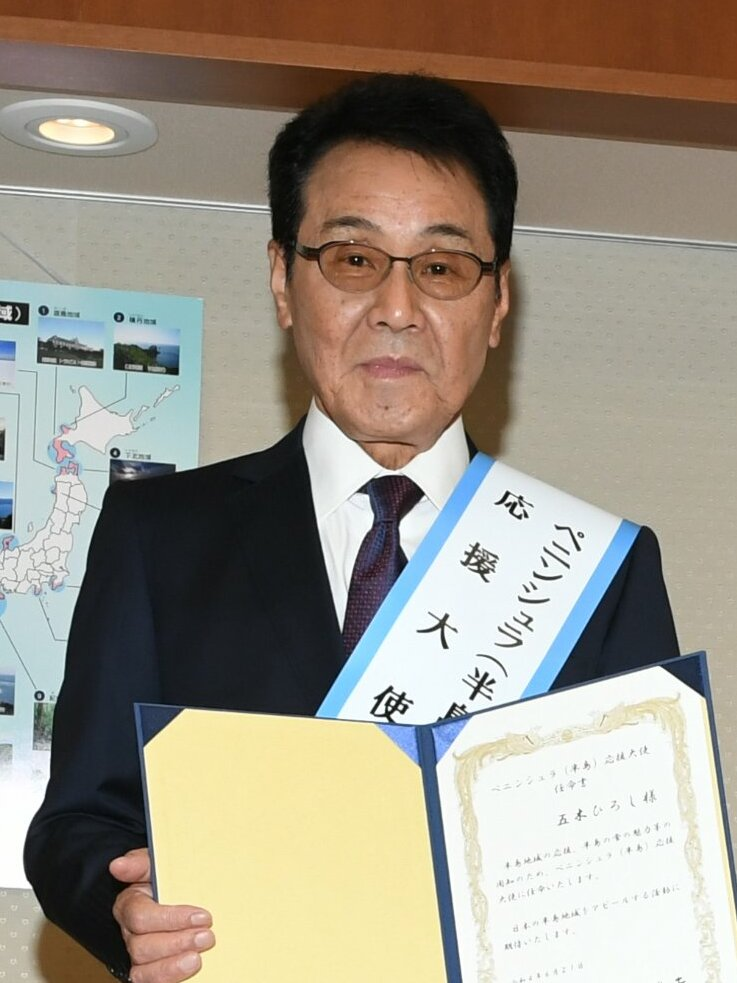
Hiroshi Itsuki, awarded Vocalist Award.

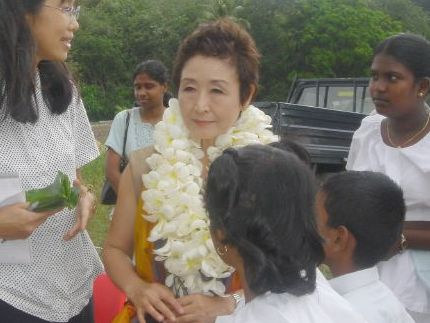
Tokiko Kato, third award in JRA after awarded New Artist Award 5 years ago and another Vocalist Award 2 years ago.

Vocalist Award

- Yuuko Nagisa for "Saihate Bojou"
- Hiroshi Itsuki for "Yokohama Tasogare"
- Tokiko Kato for "Shiretoko Ryojou"
  - Awarded after 2 years, 2nd vocalist award.

New Artist Award

- Saori Minami for "17-sai"
- Simmons for "Koibito Mo Inainoni"
- Ouyang Fei Fei for "Ame No Midousuji"
- Naoki Hongou for "Moeru Koibito"

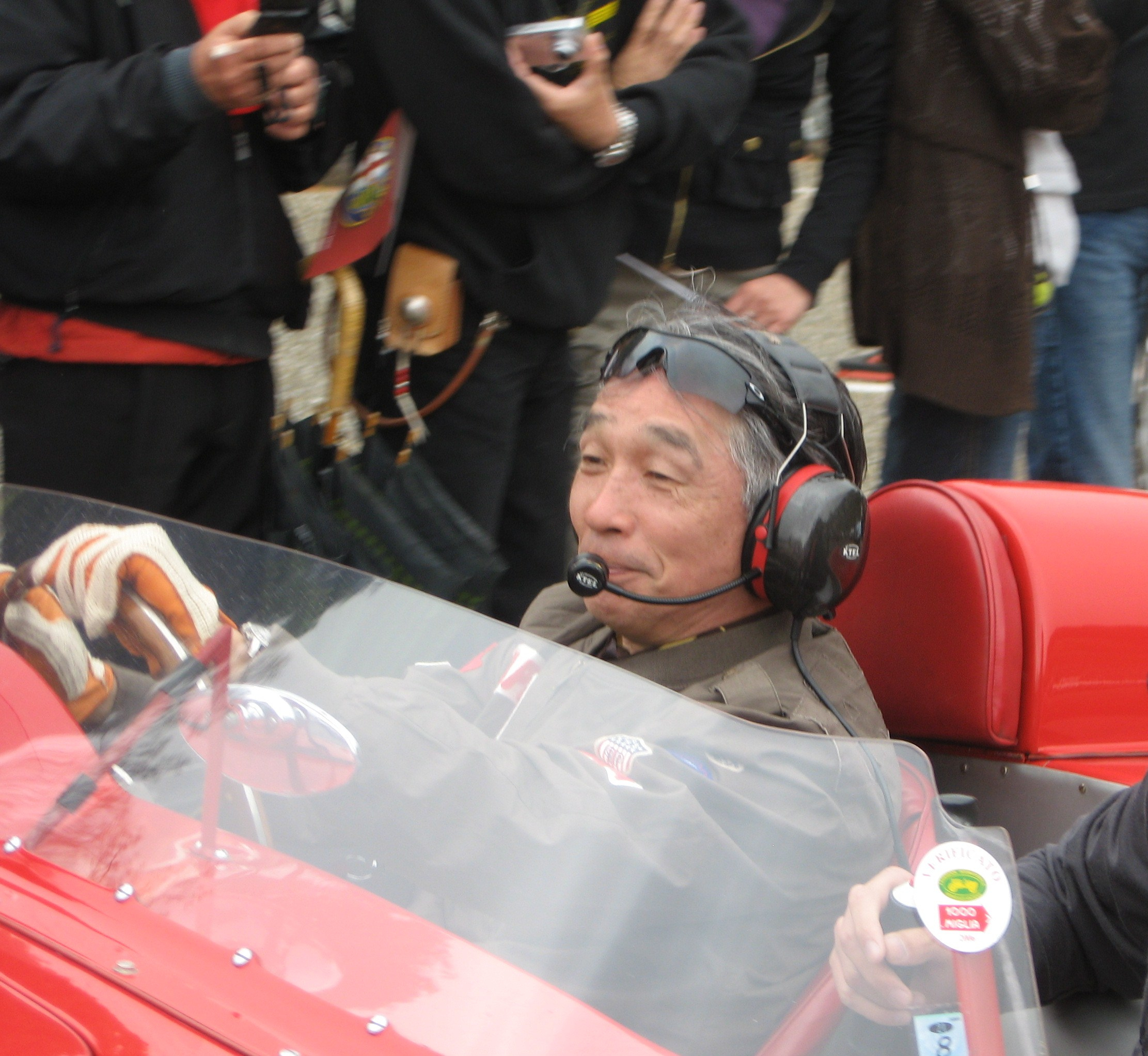
Masaaki Sakai, General Public Award winner.

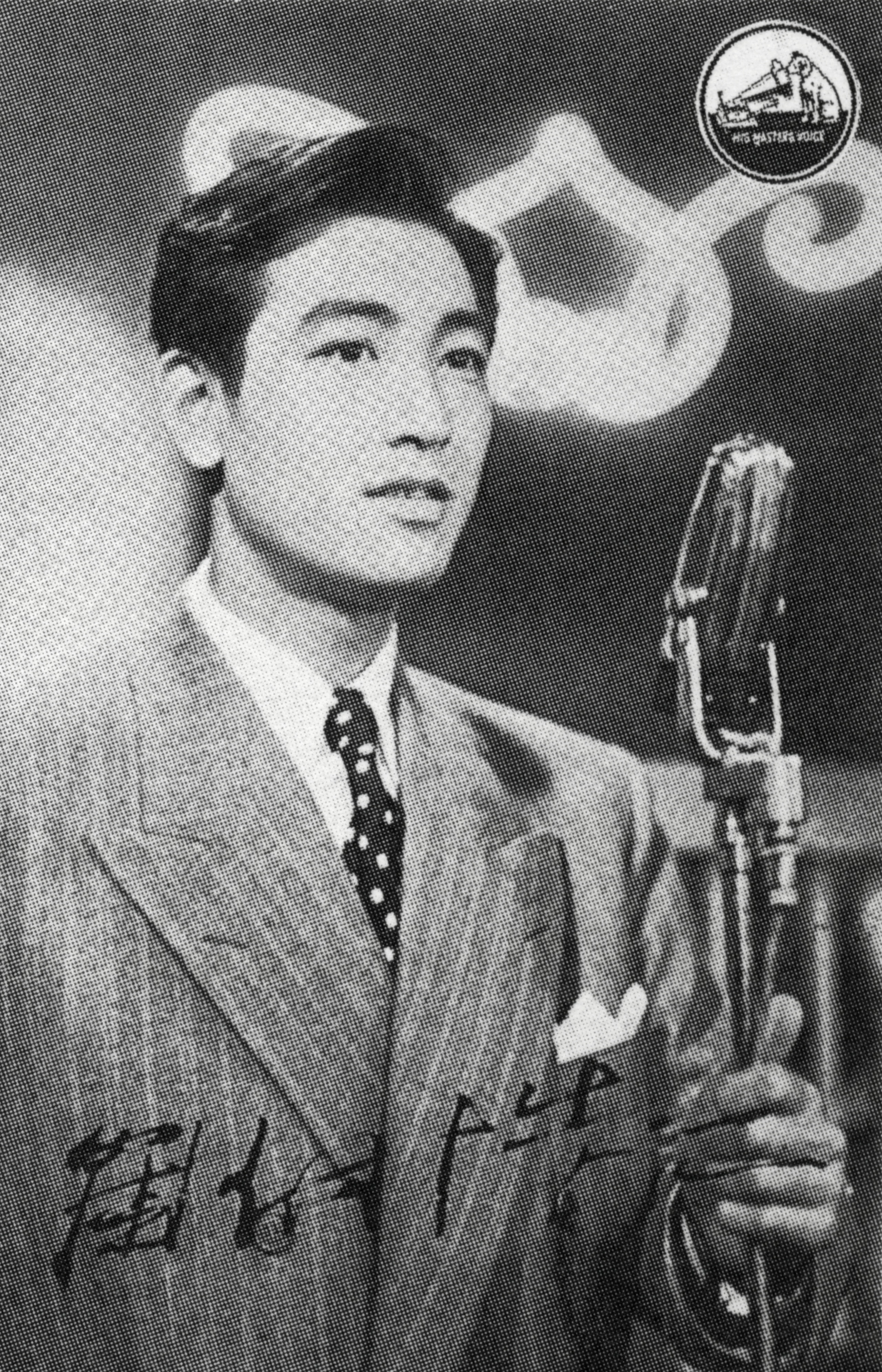
Kōji Tsuruta, General Public Award winner.

General Public Award

- Masaaki Sakai for "Saraba Koibito"
- Kōji Tsuruta for "Kizudarake No Jinsei"

Composer Award

- Kyōhei Tsutsumi for "Manatsu No Dekigoto" and "Ame Ga Yandara"
  - Singer: Miki Hirayama and Yukiji Asaoka
  - Awarded again after 2 years, 2nd composer award

Arranger Award

- Katsuhisa Hattori for "Hana No Märchen"
  - Singer: Dark Ducks

Lyricist Award

- Osamu Kitayama for "Children Who Don't Know War" and Bouken
  - Singer: Jiros and Yumi Makiba

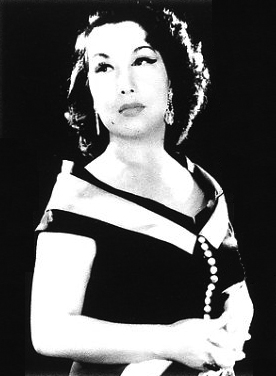
Noriko Awaya, Special Award winner.

Special Award

- Noriko Awaya
  - Song: Wakare No Blues

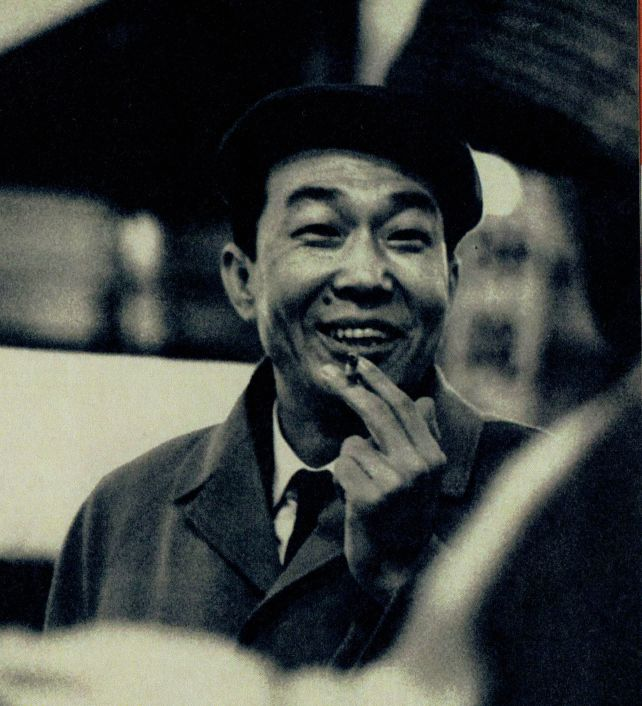
Shoichi Ozawa, awarded Planning Award with JVC company.

Planning Award

- JVC and Shoichi Ozawa for "Document-Nihon No Horo Gei"
  - Awarded again after 3 years, Ozawa's 3rd planning award.

Children's Song Award

- Hibari Junior Chorus for "Jinjin"

== See also ==
- 1971 in Japanese music
