= Kaori Takahashi =

Kaori Takahashi may refer to:

- Kaori Takahashi (synchronised swimmer) (高橋 馨, born 1974), Japanese synchronized swimmer
- Kaori Takahashi (actress) (高橋 かおり, born 1975), Japanese actress
