= Tetta =

- Pronunciation: teQta (IPA)
- Gender: Male

Origin
- Origin: Japanese
- Meaning: Different meanings depending on the kanji used

Tetta is a masculine Japanese given name.

== Written forms ==
Tetta can be written using different combinations of kanji characters. Some examples:

- 鉄太, "iron, thick"
- 鉄多, "iron, many"
- 鉄汰, "iron, excessive"
- 哲太, "philosophy, thick"
- 哲多, "philosophy, many"
- 哲汰, "philosophy, excessive"
- 徹太, "penetrate, thick"

The name can also be written in hiragana てった or katakana テッタ.

== Notable people with the name ==
- Tetta Kawai (河井 哲太; born 2000), Japanese footballer
- Tetta Sugimoto (杉本 哲太; born 1965), Japanese actor
