= Fibe Mini =

Japanese soft drink

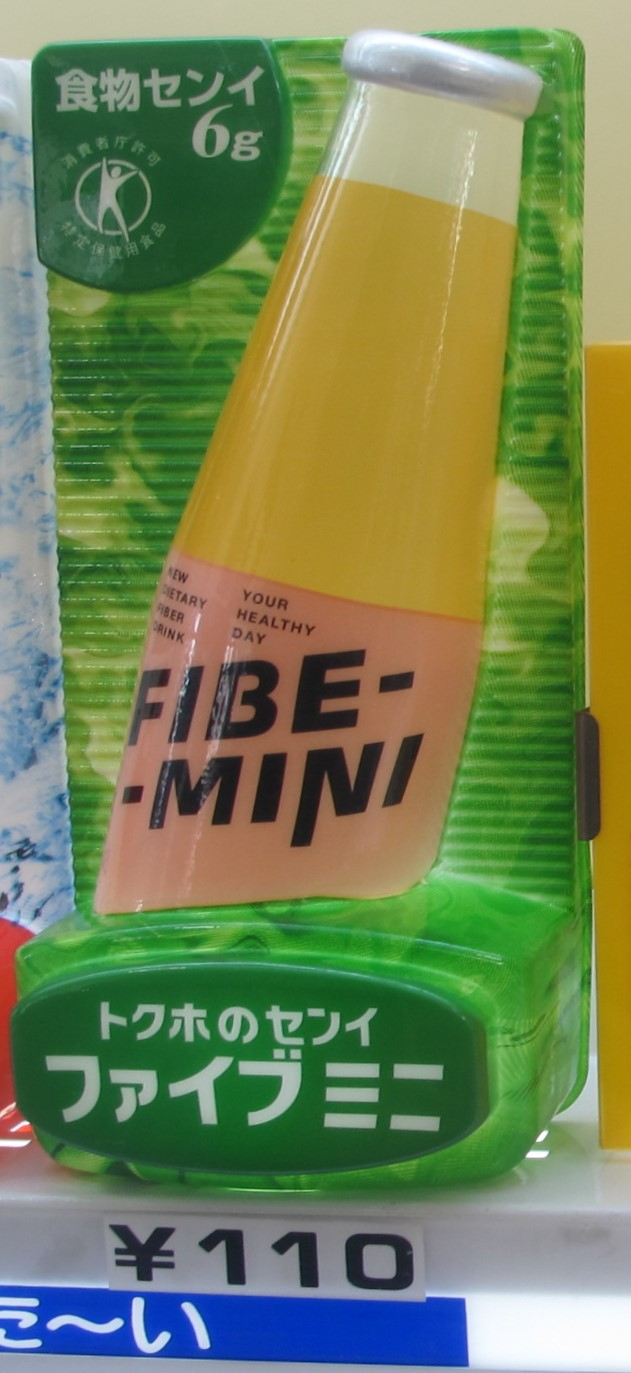
- A Fibe Mini drink in a vending machine
- Type: Soft drink
- Manufacturer: Otsuka Pharmaceutical
- Origin: Japan
- Introduced: 1988
- Colour: Light pink
- Flavour: Grapefruit; Lemon
- Ingredients: Sugars; Polydextrose; Vitamin C
- Variants: Fibe-Mini (Classic); Fibe-Mini Plus; Fibe-Mini Jelly
- Website: www.otsuka.co.jp/product/fibemini
- Standard drinkware: 100 ml, 3.4 fl oz
- Served: 100 ml
- Preparation: Fibe-Mini; Vitamin C Fiber jelly

Fibe Mini (ファイブミニ) is a Japanese soft drink with added dietary fiber produced by Otsuka Pharmaceutical. It was launched in 1988, and is often considered the first "functional food".

== Overview ==
The functional ingredient is polydextrose, which has been associated with health benefits. The drink also includes minerals and vitamins.

It was a hit upon launch and began the functional food trend in Japan from 1988 to 1989, a period that produced 51 dietary fiber drinks. The fiber sources of these products were often added to milk and soft drinks.
