= (C6H10O5)n =

(C_{6}H_{10}O_{5})_{n} may refer to several polymers sharing the molecular formula:

- Polydextrose
- Glucans:
  - Cellulose
  - Curdlan
  - Glycogen
  - Pullulan
