= To Trap a Kidnapper =

- Film poster
- Directed by: Shunya Itō
- Screenplay by: Hirō Matsuda
- Starring: Kenichi Hagiwara; Rumiko Koyanagi; Kumiko Akiyoshi
- Cinematography: Shinsaku Himeda
- Edited by: Takeo Toda
- Music by: Shunsuke Kikuchi
- Distributed by: Toei
- Release date: September 25, 1982 (Japan)
- Running time: 134 minutes
- Country: Japan
- Language: Japanese

To Trap a Kidnapper (Japanese: 誘拐報道, Hepburn: Yûkai hôdô) is a 1982 Japanese film directed by Shunya Itō. It was written by Hirō Matsuda and draws inspiration from a real-life case of child abduction. Toei released the film on September 25, 1982, in Japan.

== Premise ==
Hideyuki (Motoyoshi Wada) and Kaori (Kaori Takahashi) are classmates at a prestigious private school near Osaka. Kaori's father Kazuo (Kenichi Hagiwara) once owned a successful café, but was swindled out of his business by a shady loanshark, while Hideyuki's father Noboru (Fujita Okamoto) is a doctor with a stable career but secret debts. Kazuo, resentful of Noboru's seemingly perfect middle-class life, kidnaps Hideyuki in order to obtain ransom money. The police and press become involved as Kazuo comes to regret his decision.

== Cast ==
- Kenichi Hagiwara as Kazuo Furuya, the Kidnapper
- Rumiko Koyanagi as Yoshie Furuya, Kazuo's Wife
- Kaori Takahashi as Kaori Furuya, Kazuo's Daughter
- Motoyoshi Wada as Hideyuki Mitamura, the Victim
- Kumiko Akiyoshi as Hisako Mitamura, the Victim's Mother
- Fujita Okamoto as Noboru Mitamura, the Victim's Father
- Shin Takuma as Kotaro Taki, the Newspaper Reporter
- Miwako Okamura as Tomoko Tsushima, Kotaro's Girlfriend (credited as Miwako Fujitani)
- Ichirō Ogura as Uno, Reporter
- Tomo'o Nagai as Yoshimoto, Editor in Chief
- Shinsuke Minami as Onishi, Newspaper Editor
- Shirō Itō as Endo, Police
- Mikijirō Hira as Kenmochi, Police
- Natsuko Kahara as Kazuo's Mother
- Kayo Matsuo as Harue, Hostess
- Junko Takazawa as Hiromi, Hostess
- Shinya Owada as Watanabe
- Nabe Osami as Takarazuka
- Bunta Sugawara as Pilot
- Tetsurō Tamba as Domon
- Hiroshi Miyauchi
- Akira Nakao
- Jun Fujimaki as Hattori
- Shino Ikenami as Nobuyo Shoji
- Masayuki Yuhara as Shinji Kubo
- Isao Hashimoto
- Fukunosuke Izumi

== Awards ==
6th Japan Academy Prize

- Won: Best Supporting Actress - Rumiko Koyanagi
- Won: Best Cinematographer - Shinsaku Himeda
- Nominated: Best Film
- Nominated: Best Director - Shunya Itō
- Nominated: Best Screenplay - Hirō Matsuda
- Nominated: Best Actor - Kenichi Hagiwara
- Nominated: Best Supporting Actress - Kumiko Akiyoshi

56th Kinema Junpo Best Ten Awards

- Best Ten List: 9th place
- Readers' Choice Top 10 Japanese Films of the Year: 4th place
- Won: Best Supporting Actress (Rumiko Koyanagi)
