= Japan Music Awards =

Japan Music Award
- Awarded for: Outstanding achievements in the record industry
- Country: Japan
- Presented by: Broadcast Music Producers Federation
- First award: 1970
- Final award: 1993

The Japan Music Awards (日本歌謡大賞, Nihon Kayō Taishō) for outstanding achievements in the Broadcast Music Producers Federation, was major music awards show held annually in Japan from 1970 to 1993. The 1988 awards ceremony was cancelled due to the deteriorating health of Emperor Shōwa.

== List of Japan Music Award winners ==
The following is a list of the winning songs and artists:

Year	Song	Artist	Broadcaster
1970	"Keiko no Yume wa Yoru Hiraku" (圭子の夢は夜ひらく; "Keiko's Dream Opens at Night")	Keiko Fuji	none
1971	"Mata Au Hi Made" (また逢う日まで; "Until the Day We Meet Again")	Kiyohiko Ozaki	TX
1972	"Seto no Hanayone" (瀬戸の花嫁; "My Bride Is a Mermaid")	Rumiko Koyanagi	CX
1973	"Kiken na Futari" (危険なふたり; "Dangerous Pair")	Kenji Sawada	NTV
1974	"Erimo-misaki" (襟裳岬; "Cape Erimo")	Shinichi Mori	NET
1975	"Cyclamen no Kahori" (シクラメンのかほり, Shikuramen no Kaori; "Fragrance of Cyclamen")	Akira Fuse	TX
1976	"Kita no Yado kara" (北の宿から; "From the North Inn")	Harumi Miyako	CX
1977	"Katte ni Shiyagare" (勝手にしやがれ; "Arbitrarily")	Kenji Sawada	NTV
1978	"Southpaw" (サウスポー, Sausupō)	Pink Lady	ANB
1979	"Young Man (Y.M.C.A.)"	Hideki Saijo	TX
1980	"Ame no Bojō" (雨の慕情; "Longing for Rain")	Aki Yashiro	CX
1981	"Ruby no Yubi wa" (ルビーの指環, Rubī no yubi wa; "Ruby Ring")	Akira Terao	NTV
1982	"Seibo-tachi no Lullaby" (聖母たちのララバイ, Seibo-tachi no rarabai; "Our Lady's Lullaby")	Hiromi Iwasaki	ANB
1983	"Saraba... Natsu" (さらば・・・夏; "Farewell... Summer")	Toshihiko Tahara	TX
1984	"Nagara Gawa Enka" (長良川艶歌; "Nagara River")	Hiroshi Itsuki	CX
1985	"Taishō" (大将; "General")	Masahiko Kondo	NTV
1986	Fin	Akina Nakamori	ANB
1987	"Naite Mirya Iijan" (泣いてみりゃいいじゃん; "Trying to Cry")	Masahiko Kondo	TX
1988	No award		
1989	"Taiyō ga Ippai" (太陽がいっぱい; "The Sun Is Full")	Hikaru Genji	CX
1990	"Koi Uta Tsudzuri" (恋唄綴り; "Love Song Spelling")	Takao Horiuchi	NTV
1991	"Nasakenē" (情けねえ; "Sorry")	Tunnels	ANB
1992	"Hanaban ka" (花挽歌)	Kaori Kozai	TX
1993	"Kagebōshi" (影法師; "Shadow Man")	Takao Horiuchi	CX

== Members of Federation ==
- Nippon Television
- Fuji Television
- TV Asahi
- TV Tokyo
- Nippon Cultural Broadcasting
- Nippon Broadcasting System
- Radio Nippon
- Tokyo FM

== Venues ==
- 1970-1971: Keio Plaza Hotel
- 1972: Shinjuku Koma Theater
- 1975: Nakano Sun Plaza
- 1973 - 1974, 1976-1978, 1980-1987, 1989-1992: Nippon Budokan
- 1979: NHK Hall
- 1993: Tokyo Bay NK Hall

== See also ==
- American Music Award (similar American music show)
