= Hakujasho =

- DVD cover
- Directed by: Shunya Itō
- Screenplay by: Tatsuo Nogami
- Based on: Hakujasho by Tsutomu Mizukami
- Produced by: Kanji Amao; Tsuneo Seto
- Starring: Rumiko Koyanagi; Tetta Sugimoto; Tomisaburo Wakayama; Seiji Miyaguchi; Tanie Kitabayashi
- Cinematography: Fujio Morita
- Edited by: Kiyoaki Saitō
- Music by: Shunsuke Kikuchi
- Distributed by: Toei
- Release date: November 12, 1983 (Japan)
- Running time: 118 minutes
- Country: Japan
- Language: Japanese

Hakujasho (Japanese: 白蛇抄), also known as White Snake Enchantment, is a 1983 Japanese film directed by Shunya Itō. The film was based on a novel of the same name by Tsutomu Mizukami, originally published in February 1982 by Shueisha. It was released on November 12, 1983 by Toei, in Japan.

== Premise ==
After saving a woman (Rumiko Koyanagi) from committing suicide at a waterfall, a priest (Tomisaburo Wakayama) and his son (Tetta Sugimoto) both fall in love with her.

== Cast ==
- Rumiko Koyanagi as Uta Ishidate
- Tetta Sugimoto as Masao Kanamishima
- Tomisaburo Wakayama as Ekai Kanamishima
- Seiji Miyaguchi as Jikan
- Tanie Kitabayashi as Tane
- Isao Natsuyagi as Inspector Murai
- Nana Okada as Yasue
- Nobuko Sendo as Matsuno Uto
- Mitsue Suzuki as Sawa
- Kazunaga Tsuji as Sokai
- Koji Miemachi as Fireman A
- Shinya Owada as Fireman B
- Fukunosuke Izumi as Fireman C
- Ryō Suga as Fireman D
- Masanori Macida as Monk A
- Kazumasa Taguchi as Monk B
- Toyonori Murazoe as Monk C
- Yoshio Sudo as Monk D
- Hiroki Oshima as Monk E
- Takashi Itô as Villager
- Midori Suzuki as Kazuko
- Kiyomi Minami as Hiromi
- Yumiko Miyake as Midori
- Nana Shiraishi as Miki
- Teruo Shimizu as Nightwatchman at the Honzan Dojo
- Sachiko Tange as Suicidal young woman
- Keiko Itō as Noble
- Chū Takatsuki as Monk's guide
- Jirō Sagawa as Bereaved family member
- Yuri Osawa as Radio announcer (voice only)

== Awards ==
7th Japan Academy Prize

- Won: Best Actress - Rumiko Koyanagi
