= Gulliver Boy =

Japanese anime television series

- Main characters
- 空想科学世界ガリバーボーイ; Kūsō Kagaku Sekai Gulliver Boy
- Genre: Adventure, science fiction, Mecha
- Created by: Oji Hiroi; Toyoo Ashida
- Developed by: Junki Takegami; Yukiyoshi Ōhashi
- Directed by: Toyoo Ashida
- Music by: Kohei Tanaka
- Country of origin: Japan
- Original language: Japanese
- No. of episodes: 50

Production
- Producer: Shinji Shimizu
- Production companies: Fuji Television; Toei Animation

Original release
- Network: Fuji Television
- Release: January 8 – December 24, 1995

Imagination Science World Gulliver Boy (Japanese: 空想科学世界ガリバーボーイ, Hepburn: Kūsō Kagaku Sekai Garibābōi) or simply Gulliver Boy is a Japanese anime series created by Oji Hiroi and Toyoo Ashida. It was produced by Toei Animation, directed by Ashida and aired on Fuji TV from January 8, 1995, to December 24 of that year. On December 5, 2012, Pony Canyon released the series in a DVD box in Japan.

== Characters ==
- Gulliver Toscanni

Protagonist of the series, a magician who must remain enclosed in the Yoke magic school to protect his friend Edison. When he returns to his country, Venice, he finds out that it is being attacked by Spain.

- Edison

Young scientific genius, Gulliver's friend.

- Misty

A girl, the friend of Gulliver, who saved him from the troops of Spain.

- Phoebe

A Dark fairy who takes a liking to Gulliver, and vows never to leave his side.

- King Yudo

King of Spain, deeply in love with Misty. He killed Gulliver's father, but when he was informed that there was a son, promised himself that he would kill the son, so they could be in paradise together. It is later revealed in the second half of the series that he is controlled by Hallelujah, the sums of evil.

- King of Venice

His kingdom is attacked by the army of Spain. He does not understand why Yudo is doing this, since there was previously peace between the two countries.

- Papa Toscanni

Raises Gulliver as his son. Yudo kills him, but before he dies he manages to confess to Gulliver that he is not his true father.

- Hallelujah

The true main antagonist of the first part of the series (before being replaced by Daisaemon for the second part of the series). Hallelujah is a demon and the origin of all evil in the world; a world that she intends to devour. She brainwashes the faux main antagonist Yudo who uses Spain in an attempt to take over Europe.

- Daisaemon

Daimyo of Japan, the main antagonist of the second and final part of the series. Unlike Hallelujah the main antagonist of the first part of the series who is a serious and threatening antagonist, Daisaemon is more of a goofy and comedic antagonist.

== Voice cast ==
Character	Voice actor
Gulliver Toscanni	Kappei Yamaguchi
Misty	Chisa Yokoyama
Phoebe	Wakana Yamazaki (TV series); Miina Tominaga (PC Engine game)
Edison	Ikue Ōtani
Gekkou	Ryotaro Okiayu
Edokko	Naoki Tatsuta
Papa Toscanni	Takeshi Aono (TV series); Hidekatsu Shibata (PC Engine game)
Lawrence	Toshiyuki Morikawa (TV series); Urara Takano (PC Engine game)
Lee 10 Bai	Chafurin (TV series); Akio Ohtsuka (PC Engine game)
Full Moon Baron	Bin Shimada (TV series); Tessho Genda (PC Engine game)
Budo Muscle	Wataru Takagi (TV series); Masashi Sugawara (PC Engine game)
Judau	Kaneto Shiozawa (TV series); Jurouta Kosugi (PC Engine game)
Majin	Takeshi Aono
Hallelujah	Rihoko Yoshida (TV series); Kumiko Takizawa (PC Engine game)
Steel Bat	Megumi Hayashibara; Hiromi Tsuru (PC Engine game)
Nikita	Michie Tomizawa (TV series); Keiko Toda (PC Engine game)
Narrator	Mahito Ōba

== Music ==
=== Ignite! Gulliver Boy ===
"Ignite! Gulliver Boy"

Single by Kiyohiko Ozaki
- Released: February 25, 1995
- Genre: Anime song
- Length: 3:44
- Label: Mercury Music Entertainment JP
- Songwriter: Yukinojo Mori

Ignite! Gulliver Boy (燃えろ!ガリバーボーイ, Moero! Garibābōi) is a song by Jpop vocalist Kiyohiko Ozaki and serves as the opening theme to the anime Gulliver Boy. It was released Mercury Music Entertainment on February 25, 1995, in Japan only. The song was written by Yukinojo Mori, composed by Toshiaki Yamazaki, and arranged by Michihiko Ohta. Coupled with the song is the show's first closing theme "Kagami no Naka no Yūsha" which is also performed by Ozaki.

Track List

1. 燃えろ!ガリバーボーイ
  Moero! Garibābōi/Ignite! Gulliver Boy
2. 鏡の中の勇者
  Kagami no Naka no Yūsha/A Brave Man in the Mirror
3. 燃えろ!ガリバーボーイ(オリジナル・カラオケ)
  Moero! Garibābōi (Orijinaru Karaoke)/Ignite! Gulliver Boy (Original Karaoke)
4. 鏡の中の勇者(オリジナル・カラオケ)
  Kagami no Naka no Yūsha (Orijinaru Karaoke)/A Brave Man in the Mirror (Original Karaoke)

=== Aitai Kara ===
"Aitai Kara"

Single by Misumi
- Released: September 25, 1995
- Genre: Anime song
- Length: 3:28
- Label: Mercury Music Entertainment JP
- Songwriter: Takahiro Maeda

"Aitai Kara" (逢いたいから, Because I Want to Meet) is a song by Jpop vocalist Misumi and serves as the second closing theme to the anime Gulliver Boy. It was released by Mercury Music Entertainment on September 25, 1995, in Japan only. The song was written by Takahiro Maeda with composition and arrangements by Masahiro Takatsuki. The song is coupled with another Misumi song called "Dreamer".

Track List

1. 逢いたいから
  Aitai Kara/Because I Want to Meet
2. Dreamer
3. 逢いたいから(オリジナル・カラオケ)
  Aitai Kara (Orijinaru Karaoke)/Because I Want to Meet (Original Karaoke)

== Video games ==
- Name: Imagination Science World Gulliver Boy (空想科学世界ガリバーボーイ, Kūsô Kagaku Sekai Garibābōi)
- Publishers: Hudson Soft (Sega Saturn, PC Engine); Bandai (Game Boy, SNES).
- Releases date:
  - April 28, 1995 Game Boy
  - May 26, 1995 PC Engine
  - March 22, 1996 Sega Saturn
  - June 28, 1996 SNES

All in Japan

- Genre: Role-playing video game, Puzzle (Game Boy)
- Players: One Player
- Platforms: Game Boy, SNES, PC Engine, Sega Saturn
- Language: Japanese
