= Santa Fe (book) =

Japanese nude photo book

- Author: Rie Miyazawa
- Cover artist: Kishin Shinoyama
- Genre: Nude photography
- Publisher: Asahi Press
- Publication date: November 13, 1991
- Publication place: Japan
- Media type: Print (hardback)
- ISBN: 4-255-91046-4

Santa Fe (Japanese: サンタフェ) is a 1991 coffee table book by Japanese actress Rie Miyazawa and photographer Kishin Shinoyama. It was published by Asahi Press. The book features an 18-year-old Miyazawa posing nude amongst the desert landscape of Santa Fe, New Mexico.

It was taken at the height of Miyazawa's fame, and attracted controversy as authorities had just begun to permit the publication of "hair nudes" (ヘアヌード), or photography that did not censor pubic hair.

== Background ==
In 1991, Rie Miyazawa was a popular idol actress, singer and tarento who was managed by her mother, Mitsuko (or "Rie-mama"). She was at the forefront of the bishōjo būmu (美少女ブーム; lit. "beautiful girl boom") in the late 1980s to 90s, where "beautiful, inaccessible" idols replaced the "girl next door" types in television and advertising. By 1990, Miyazawa was the top female commercial talent, representing nine different companies. Her contracts were worth a reported 50 to 60 million yen each.

Kishin Shinoyama was a famed photographer known for his celebrity portraits. He rose to prominence in Japan for his work with the controversial author Yukio Mishima, said to be one of Mishima's last portraits before his suicide in 1970. Shinoyama is perhaps best known in the West for his photographs of musician John Lennon and partner Yoko Ono, taken months before Lennon's murder in 1980. He was also known for his provocative nude photography; his 1991 photo book Water Fruit with actress Kanako Higuchi was a precursor to Santa Fe, published ten months earlier.

== Development ==
Shinoyama was on the set of director Hiroshi Teshigahara's 1992 film Basara: The Princess Goh (豪姫, Gô-hime) in Kyoto to photograph its lead actress Miyazawa, when he struck up a conversation with her mother, Mitsuko. He remarked to her, "Now that Rie-chan has turned 18, we should take some [nude photos] while she's still beautiful". Shinoyama didn't think he would be taken seriously, and was surprised when Mitsuko opened her planner and stated that their only opportunity would come after the holidays. Shinoyama moved forward with the project under Mitsuko's condition that it be kept confidential.

"Rie, at the time, was undoubtedly a "virgin", or a "saint", so to speak. I thought that if I was going to photograph a saint, the only place to do so was the holy land of Santa Fe."

— Shinoyama, being interviewed by Shūkan Gendai on Santa Fe in 2016.

The photographs were taken in late May 1991, over a period of three days. Santa Fe was conceived with Miyazawa's input, whose only request during the shoot was that each photograph should be able to stand on its own. Shinoyama approached it with a fine art intent, and chose Santa Fe for the location as he considered it to be a "creative mecca", due to the work of artists like painter Georgia O'Keeffe and photographer Alfred Stieglitz. He modeled the photography style after Stieglitz and Group f/64, particularly Edward Weston, Ansel Adams, and Paul Strand, whom he considered to have shot masterpieces in Santa Fe. Shinoyama wanted to photograph "the sacred body with a sacred feeling".

In 2015, Miyazawa revealed to the variety show Yorutamori that her mother had not informed her that the shoot was intended to be nude—she was eventually convinced by Mitsuko's persuasion that "beautiful things should be taken when they are beautiful." Shinoyama said that he would have respected her wishes if she had chosen not to.

The first day of shooting was fully clothed, after which a dissatisfied Mitsuko told Shinoyama: "We didn't come all the way to Santa Fe to take photos like this". When Shinoyama suggested to Miyazawa that she undress, she "easily" obliged, which came as a surprise to him: "She was the type to see it through to the end once she made up her mind. She had guts."

Miyazawa recounted, "I don't have a single unpleasant memory. We took the photos and hung them on the walls of the hotel room, with the idea that I could take any down if I didn't want them used."

"I had a great admiration for models, so I didn't have much resistance to nudity. I had always thought they were beautiful. When they asked me if I wanted to try taking some [nude], I thought "Well, no..." But if I didn't like what I saw, I could just quit. I took some photos and thought they were beautiful."

== Publication and promotion ==
The Miyazawa family originally intended for Santa Fe to be released "in a few years", however, Shinoyama's enthusiasm convinced them to publish it immediately: "Rie's beauty is a national treasure. It would be no good if each and every citizen of the country did not see this beauty."

Shinoyama chose to publish the book through Asahi Press (no relation to Asahi Shimbun Publications), as he thought that a larger publisher would leak the project, per his agreement with Mitsuko. Santa Fe was announced through a full-page ad in the October 13, 1991, issue of the Yomiuri Shimbun, with Asahi Shimbun following the next day, both respectable newspapers. It caused an instant sensation as the ad featured Miyazawa posing in the entryway of a Spanish-style house with her breasts exposed. Asahi Press reportedly received a thousand phone calls a minute. The campaign was orchestrated by editor-in-chief Shigeki Akai, at the behest of Mitsuko who suggested that ads be placed in the newspaper. Like Shinoyama, Akai gave zero information to the press, and the entire campaign cost less than 100 million yen, compared to the 10 billion yen worth of TV time that Santa Fe generated.

Miyazawa, who was filming in Canada, had no knowledge of the attention it attracted. She returned to Japan on October 21, 1991, and was greeted with a crowd of hundreds at Narita airport. A press conference with Miyazawa, Shinoyama, their publisher and the editor-in-chief of Asahi Press, was held at a nearby hotel before 200 members of the press and cameramen. When asked why she decided to publish the book, Miyazawa said that it would make "a nice memento of her 18th year", and that she was "100 percent satisfied" with it.

== Reception ==
Santa Fe was given a generally positive critical reception. Feminist art historian Midori Wakakuwa held a favorable opinion as "we can see [Miyazawa's] character and intelligence" through the book. The novelist Akiyuki Nosaka said that he was willing to "die anytime" after seeing Miyazawa in Santa Fe.

== Social impact ==
Santa Fe was an instant social phenomenon in Japan, causing public discourse in all facets of media. Critic Akio Nakamori states that it "completely changed Japanese people's awareness of nudity," while Marco Bohr, associate professor of Visual Communication at Nottingham Trent University, wrote that Santa Fe could be considered "a turning point with regards to perceptions of obscenity in Japan."

The media coverage of Santa Fe, and other works like it, centered on the English-derived hea (ヘア) from "hair", which carried less negative connotations than the Japanese chimō (恥毛; lit. "shameful hair") or inmō (陰毛; lit. "shadow hair"); a "neutralization of words relating to the body" in effect. Film critic Abe Casio writes:

"This made it possible to refer to pubic hair without qualifying characters of chi (shame) and in (shadow), which in turn made possible the pathology of openly discussing what would normally be talked about in public with some hesitancy."

This sociolinguistic shift had an impact on the nature of censorship and interpretation of Article 175 of the Penal Code of Japan. Bohr specifically cites a January 1992 decision by Tokyo Metropolitan Police that issued a cautionary statement to magazine and book editors regarding "hair nudes", in which the legality of these photographs were judged by the context in which they appeared. The photograph that attracted the most controversy in Santa Fe depicted Miyazawa from a distance, kneeling in a field of flowers with her pubic hair "barely visible". Bohr wrote that the photograph's "vibrant highlights, the strong contrast and its radiant appearance greatly affected the discourse". Police deemed it to not be obscene as it appeared in an art photography book.

Anne Allison, professor of cultural anthropology at Duke University, wrote about Santa Fe and its role in contemporary Japanese society for her 2000 book Permitted and Prohibited Desires: Mothers, Comics, and Censorship in Japan, providing a feminist psychoanalytic and Marxist inquiry into the country's obscenity laws and national identity:

"Genital realism, once the symbol for a real of domestic familialism, stands alongside such shifts in material relations as a labor force less dominated by men, a consumership of mass fantasies more participated in by women, and families in which old forms and norms are breaking down. Still, change is never clean, just as ideology is never total."

== Legacy ==
Santa Fe sold over 1.55 million copies in its first year of release, and remains as one of the best-selling nude photo books of all time in Japan. Miyazawa's status as popular star at the time of its release challenged perceptions of celebrity nudity, which was considered to be reserved for the unknown and "desperate", a "last resort of aging actresses with less-than-thriving careers". Santa Fe started a trend of nude photography books released by actresses in the 1990s, including Yoko Shimada, Miho Kanno, Saki Takaoka, Makiko Esumi, and Eri Ishida (shot by Helmut Newton).

Shinoyama chided the press's labeling of Santa Fe as a "hair nude", finding it "commercialist": "In fact, there is not a single erotic scene in that photo book that stimulates lust." Some criticized her mother for her involvement in the photo book's conception. Mitsuko was the target of "harsh attacks" by the media, who admonished her "shameless exploitation" of Miyazawa.

The book had a mixed impact on Miyazawa's immediate career. According to a survey by Nikkei Entertainment, her name recognition rose from 72.5 percent in August 1991, to nearly 100 percent by October 1991. However, when her television drama Tokyo Elevator Girl premiered in January 1992, it garnered a middling 14.3 percent share in ratings, and sales of Santa Fe were described as "slow but steady" by February 1992. Her second starring film Basara was released in April 1992, and it failed to cross the 1 billion yen mark at the box office. Maki Ōkubo, a reporter for the Asahi Shimbun, stated that the underperformance of her subsequent projects stemmed from the negative impact of Santa Fe on her image. In contrast, Asahi Journal columnist Kōichi Yamazaki simply argued that Miyazawa was no longer topical. Mark Schilling wrote, "Once people had ordered Santa Fe or thumbed through it or talked about it, they had participated, and that was enough. They evidently felt no need to actually buy the book or watch Miyazawa's TV program."

Miyazawa continued to work with Shinoyama over the next 35 years. She reunited with him for the January 2023 cover of Vogue Japan.
