= Nana Okada (singer, born 1959) =

Japanese actress and singer

- 岡田奈々
- Born: Hiroko Yai (矢井 弘子, Yai Hiroko); February 12, 1959 (age 67); Gifu Prefecture, Japan
- Occupations: Actress; singer
- Years active: 1974–present
- Notable work: "Seishun no Sakamichi"
- Musical career
- Years active: 1974–1986
- Website: Official website

Hiroko Yai (Japanese: 矢井 弘子, Hepburn: Yai Hiroko; born February 12, 1959), better known by her stage name Nana Okada (岡田 奈々, Okada Nana), is a Japanese actress and former idol singer.

== Biography ==
Nana Okada got her start in show business in the TV Asahi program "Anata o Star Ni!" (You Are a Star!) in 1974. She was signed to NAV Records and released her first single, "Hitorigoto" (Soliloquy), in May 1975.

In the spring of 1976 she released her biggest hit and signature song "Seishun no Sakamichi" (The Hills of Youth), which reached the Oricon top 30. Other top 40 hits would follow, such as "Wakai Kisetsu" (The Young Season), "Teami no Present" (Hand-knitted Present) and "Soyokaze to Watashi" (The Breeze And I). Her last single was released in 1986.

Nana Okada has also acted in movies and drama series.

In May 1977, a man armed with a knife invaded Okada's apartment and held her captive for five hours before escaping. Okada was injured on both hands, but was otherwise not physically assaulted. The perpetrator was never identified, and Okada suffered a decline in popularity due to the media reporting which damaged her "innocent" image. When author and former yakuza George Abe interviewed Okada for Weekly Asahi Geinō years later, he revealed that he had been her admirer, and that when serving time in the Tokyo Detention House, he had met a fellow inmate who claimed to be the perpetrator of the crime and had beaten him up so severely that he would suffer "lifetime injuries".

== Discography ==
=== Singles ===
1. Hitorigoto (10 May 1975)
2. Jogakusei (25 Aug. 1975)
3. Kuchizuke (10 Dec. 1975)
4. Seishun no Sakamichi (10 Mar. 1976)
5. Wakai Kisetsu (10 Jun. 1976)
6. Teami no Present (10 Sep. 1976)
7. Kazaranai Seishun (21 Dec. 1976)
8. Soyokaze to Watashi (10 Apr. 1977)
9. Love Step Jump (10 Jul. 1977)
10. Kyūai Senka (25 Sep. 1977)
11. Bye-bye Lullaby (10 Feb. 1978)
12. Dame Desuka (25 Apr. 1978)
13. Shonan Kaigan Dori (21 Sep. 1978)
14. Kake (21 Mar. 1979)
15. Quiet Dance (21 Oct. 1980)
16. It's For You c/w Nagai Yoru (5 Feb. 1986)

=== Albums ===
1. Nana no Hitorigoto (25 Jul. 1975)
2. Akogare (10 Dec. 1975)
3. Seventeen! Okada Nana Birthday Concert (10 May 1976)
4. Akushu Shiyou yo (25 Aug. 1976)
5. Okada Nana Original Best Collection (Nov. 1976)
6. 77 Atarashii Nikkichou (25 Feb. 1977)
7. Cream Soda (25 Aug. 1977)
8. Okada Nana Best 24 (Dec. 1977)
9. Bye-bye Lullaby / Ai no Finale (25 Mar. 1978)
10. Mr. Arranger (5 Nov. 1978)

== Filmography ==
=== Films ===
- G.I. Samurai (1979) - Kazuko Arai
- Nomugi Pass II (1982) - Ai Kawai
- Hometown (1983) - Fuku
- Hakujasho (1983) - Yasue
- Okinawan Boys (1983)
- Legend of the Eight Samurai (1983) - Hamaji
- Love & Pop (1998) - Hiromi's Mother
- The Book Peddler (2016) - Kyoko Akamatsu
- Our Journey for 50 Years (2026) - Mayumi Nakatani

=== Television ===
- Oretachi no Tabi (1975) - Mayumi Nakatani
- The Unfettered Shogun (1979) - Episode 59 as Osen and Episode 82 as Yukitori
- Momotarō-zamurai (1980) - Okyō
- Sanga Moyu (1984)
- School Wars (1984)

== See also ==
- Kayōkyoku
- List of Japanese idols
