= Kishin Shinoyama =

Japanese photographer (1940–2024)

- 篠山 紀信
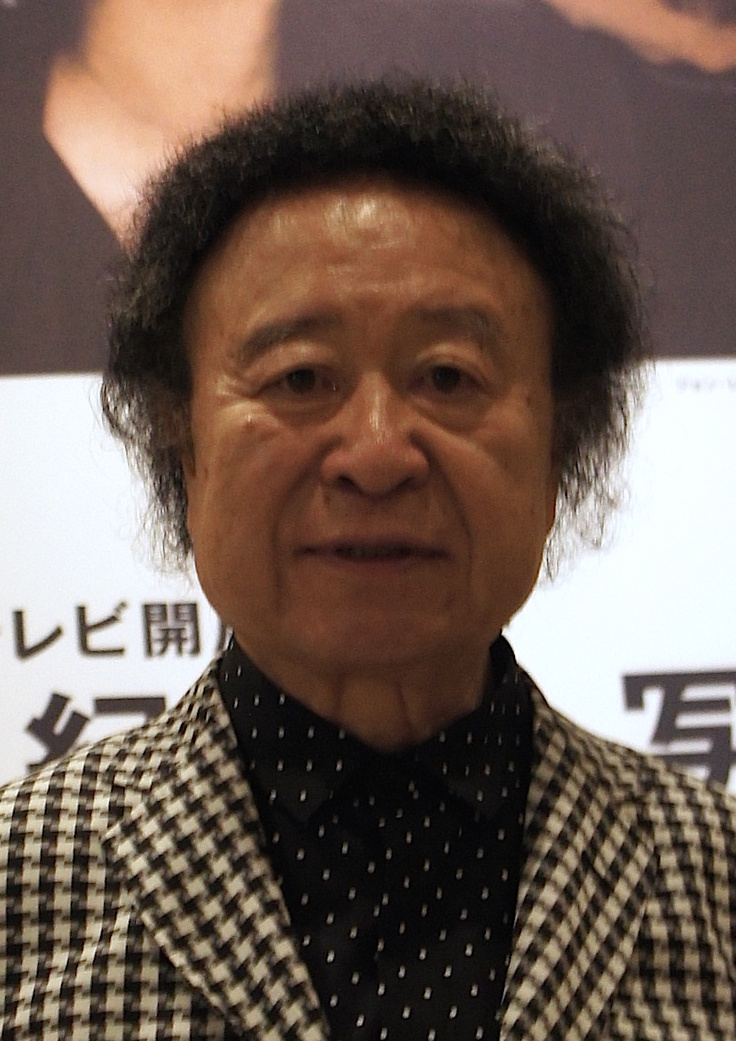
- Shinoyama at Shizuoka Prefectural Museum of Art, 2015
- Born: Shinoyama Michinobu; December 3, 1940; Shinjuku, Tokyo, Japan
- Died: January 4, 2024 (aged 83); Tokyo, Japan
- Known for: Photography
- Spouse: Saori Minami (m. 1979)
- Children: 1

Kishin Shinoyama (篠山 紀信, Shinoyama Kishin; December 3, 1940 – January 4, 2024) was a Japanese photographer. He is well-known for having photographed the covers for John Lennon and Yoko Ono's albums, Double Fantasy and Milk and Honey. Before his marriage to Saori Minami in 1979, he took a majority of the photographs for her album covers with CBS/Sony.

== Life and work ==
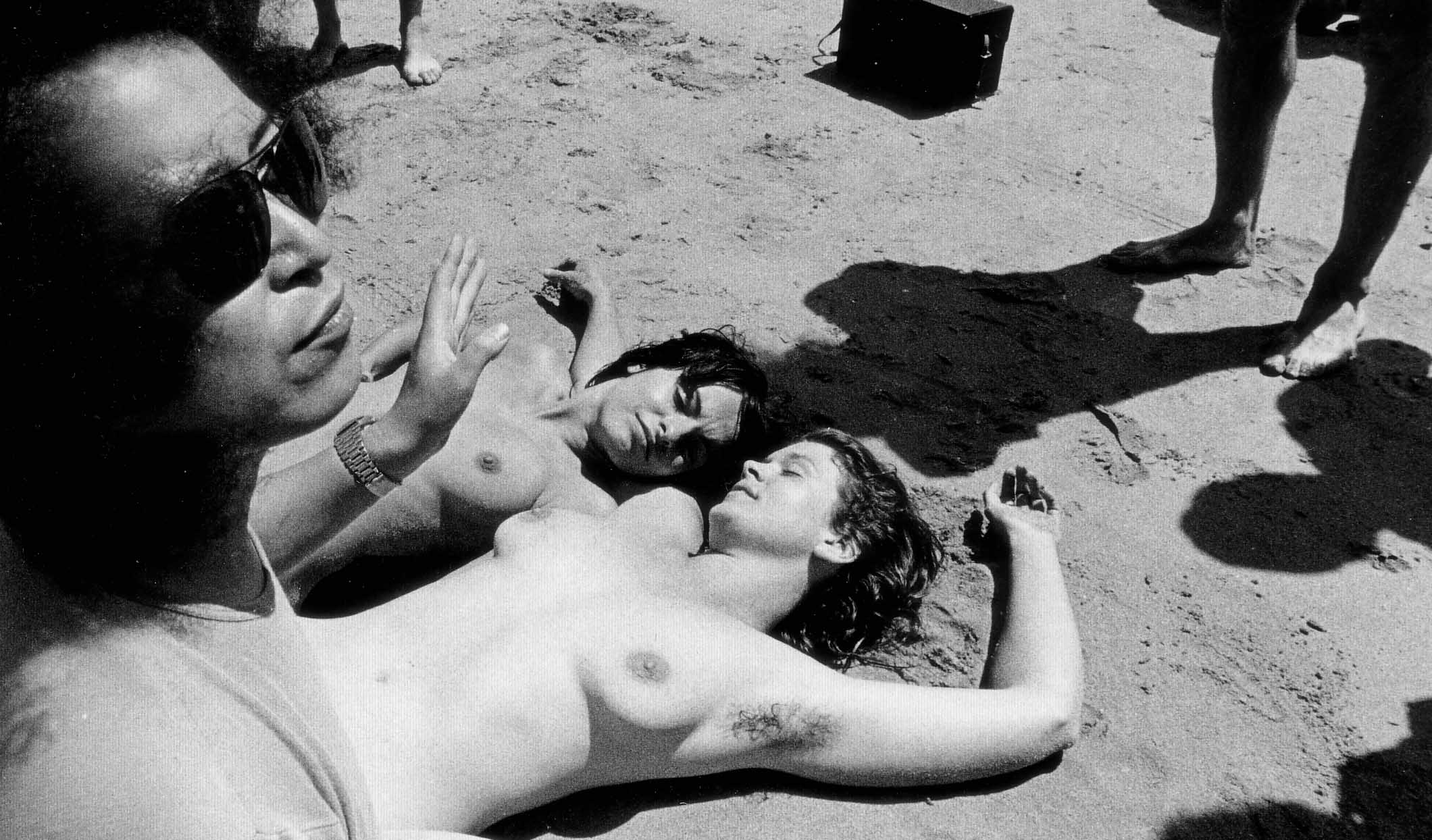
Kishin Shinoyama and two female models, Southern France, 1975. The photograph was taken during a workshop of '6èmes Rencontres Internationales de la Photographie', Arles, 1975, on a nude beach near Saintes-Maries-de-la-Mer. The feet shown in the upper-right corner are American photographer Ralph Gibson's.

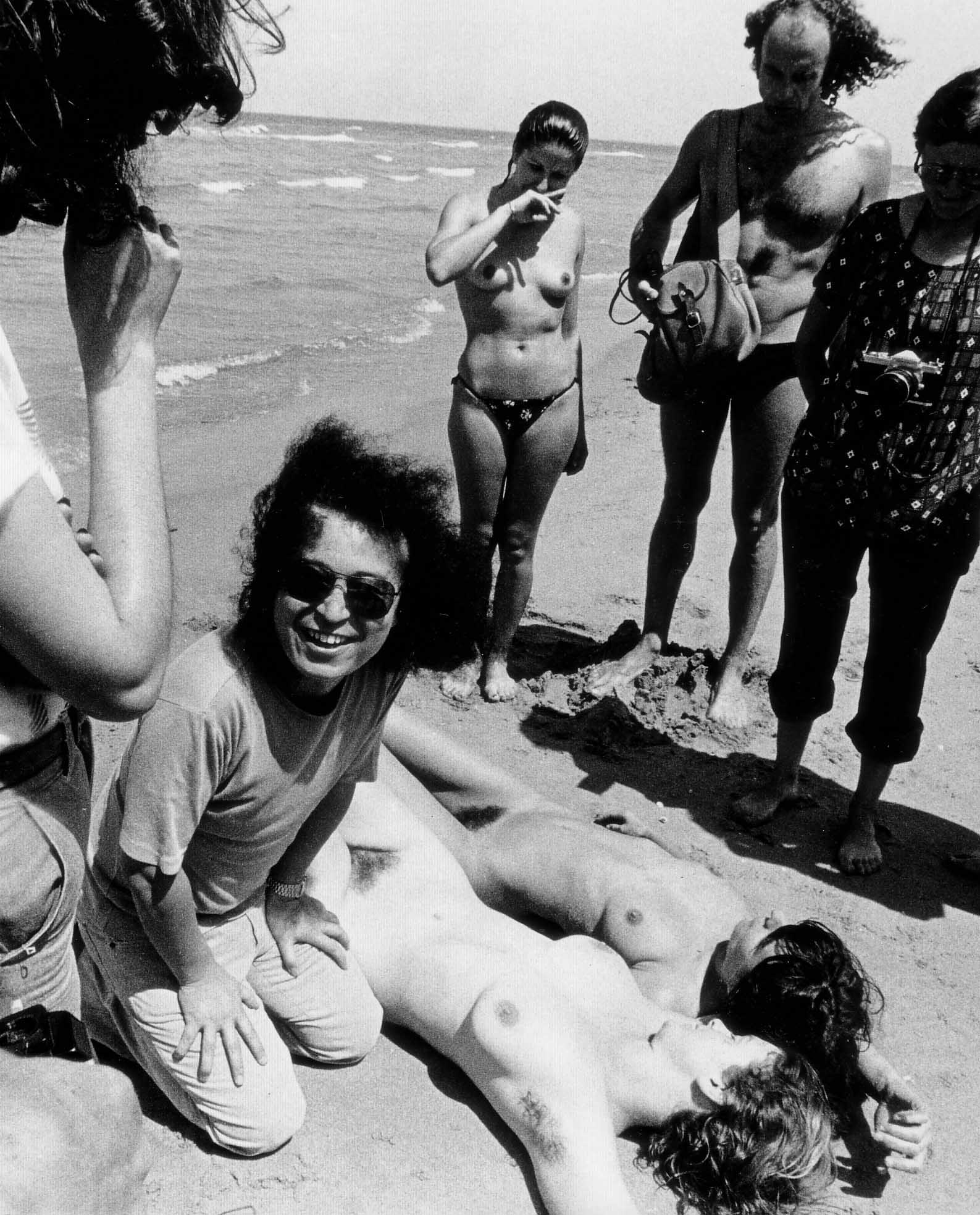
Shinoyama teaching (workshop in S. France, 1975)

Shinoyama graduated from Nihon University. He worked with the Light Publicity agency while still a student, and freelanced after graduation.

Shinoyama put out a large number of books of photographs of girls, dressed, mostly undressed, and nude.

On November 10, 2009, Shinoyama's home and office were searched by police on suspicion of public indecency. The searches stemmed from concerns regarding nude photos he allegedly took in public of two women in August 2008 for his book 20XX TOKYO. On May 26, 2010 the court found Shinoyama guilty of public indecency and defiling a place of worship for photographing at Aoyama Cemetery. He was fined 300,000 Yen.

Shinoyama was married to Saori Minami and their son is actor Akinobu Shinoyama. Kishin Shinoyama died on January 4, 2024, at the age of 83.

== Books ==
=== Books devoted to Shinoyama's works ===
This list is incomplete.

- (in Japanese) Kishin no teitaku: Sā Jon Sōn Bijutsukan (貴紳の邸宅: サー・ジョン・ソーン美術館) / Sir John Soane's Museum. Tokyo: Rokuyōsha, 1989. ISBN 978-4-89737-011-8. Text by Arata Isozaki. A detailed study of Sir John Soane's Museum (London).
- Santa Fe. Tokyo: Asahi Shuppansha, 1991. ISBN 4-255-91046-4. Rie Miyazawa, nude. (See Santa Fe.)
- 真矢みき写真集「Guy」. Takarazuka Revue Company, 1997. ISBN 978-4924333178. Photography collection featuring former Takarazuka Revue Flower Troupe top-star, Maya Miki. Shot in Vietnam over a three day period, the collection was noted for its unique portrayal of masculinity and femininity.
- (in English) The Painter's House: Balthus at the Grand Chalet. Te Neues, 2000. ISBN 978-3-8238-5472-2. Photographs of the extraordinarily large house of the Balthus family, and Balthus himself, his wife and their daughter.
- Kissin' My Puppy. Tokyo: Rasukaru, 2005. ISBN 978-4-902388-05-3. Japan's starlets (アイドルタレント, aidoru tarento) and their dogs. The minimal text is in Japanese.
- Shinoyama Kishin at Tokyo Disney Resort. Tokyo: Kodansha, 2008. ISBN 978-4-06-339758-1. Commemorative collection of photographs taken at Tokyo Disney Resort theme park for its 25th Anniversary celebrations.

=== Other books showing Shinoyama's works ===
- (in Japanese) Nihon nūdo meisakushū (日本ヌード名作集, Japanese nudes). Camera Mainichi bessatsu. Tokyo: Mainichi Shinbunsha, 1982. Pp.24–25, 222–27 show nudes by Shinoyama.
- Nihon shashin no tenkan: 1960 nendai no hyōgen (日本写真の転換: 1960時代の表現) / Innovation in Japanese Photography in the 1960s. Tokyo: Tokyo Metropolitan Museum of Photography, 1991. Exhibition catalogue, text in Japanese and English. Pp.124–29 show nudes by Shinoyama.

Works

This list is incomplete.

- A Fine Day (1975)
- Five Seasons / Matsuda Seiko (1987)
- Double Fantasy – cover photography of John Lennon and Yoko Ono
- Chemical Reaction – album cover photography of the band Vodka Collins
- 135 Women
- Gekisha Bunko Series (1986–1993)

  激写文庫 (1) 水沢アキの情熱 - Gekisha Bunko (1) Aki Mizusawa's Passion
  激写文庫 (2) 山口百恵の時代から - Gekisha Bunko (2) From the time of Momoe Yamaguchi
  激写文庫 (3) 10人の10代物語 - Gekisha Bunko (3) 10 teenage stories
  激写文庫 (4) 松本小雪という不思議少女 - Gekisha Bunko (4) A mysterious girl named Koyuki Matsumoto
  激写文庫 (5) わたしの部屋みせてあげる - Gekisha Bunko (5) I'll show you my room
  激写文庫 (6) 感謝状8人のアイドル様 - Gekisha Bunko (6) Letters of appreciation to 8 idols
  激写文庫 (7) 休日の少女たち - Gekisha Bunko (7) Girls on Holiday
  激写文庫 (8) 女優の秘密 - Gekisha Bunko (8) The secret of an actress
  激写文庫 (9) 恋人ごっこ - Gekisha Bunko (9) Lover Pretend
  激写文庫(10) いさ子の夏・奈津子の冬 - Gekisha Bunko (10) Isako's Summer/Natsuko's Winter
  激写文庫(11) 樋口可南子・贅沢な時間 - Gekisha Bunko (11) Kanako Higuchi/luxurious time
  激写文庫(12) 旅をしましょう、いっしょに - Gekisha Bunko (12) Let's travel together
  激写文庫(13) 3つの密室 - Gekisha Bunko (13) Three Secret Rooms
  激写文庫(14) シシリーの風 カリフォルニアの太陽 - Gekisha Bunko (14) Wind of Sicily, Sun of California
  激写文庫(15) TOKYO 7 GIRLS – Gekisha Bunko (15) TOKYO 7 GIRLS
  激写文庫(16) 名取裕子・明日嵐がくる - Gekisha Bunko (16) Yuko Natori/Tomorrow the storm will come
  激写文庫(17) 高樹沙耶・メガロポリス・トーキョー - Gekisha Bunko (17) Saya Takagi/Megalopolis Tokyo
  激写文庫(18) 洞口依子・8年が過ぎた - Gekisha Bunko (18) Yoriko Horaguchi – 8 years have passed
  激写文庫(19) 青山知可子・亜熱帯 - Gekisha Bunko (19) Chikako Aoyama/Subtropical
  激写文庫(20) 寺田まなみ・雪がやんで泣いた - Gekisha Bunko (20) Manami Terada cried when the snow stopped
  激写文庫(21) レイコ&麗奈 - Gekisha Bunko (21) Reiko & Reina
  激写文庫(22) 20歳の光と影 - Gekisha Bunko (22) The light and shadow of a 20-year-old
  激写文庫(23) あれ以前それ以前 - Gekisha Bunko (23) Before that, before that
  激写文庫(24) 充分な青春 - Gekisha Bunko (24) Sufficient Youth
  激写文庫(25) 5 QUEENS – Gekisha Bunko (25) 5 QUEENS
  激写文庫(26) はじまりの春、おわりの冬 - Gekisha Bunko (26) The beginning of spring, the end of winter
  激写文庫(27) 鷲尾いさ子 CIAO! - Gekisha Bunko (27) Isako Washio CIAO!
  激写文庫(28) 今日のために生まれた - Gekisha Bunko (28) Born for today
  激写文庫(29) 美しい悪戯 - Gekisha Bunko (29) Beautiful mischief
  激写文庫(30) 三人関係 - Gekisha Bunko (30) Three-person relationship

- Tokyo Nude (1990)
- SHINJUKU (1991)
- Water Fruit/Kanako Higuchi (1991) ISBN 4-255-90059-0
- NY & NY/Yurie Nitani (1991)
- Santa Fe/Rie Miyazawa (1991)
- TOKYO Future Century (1992)
- Food (1992)
- Balthus (1993)
- News 1 Mystery of T House (1994)
- News 2 [Miwako] (1994)
- News 3 DrugStore (1994)
- News 4/Riona Hazuki (1994)
- Harue Miyamoto (1994)
- Hair (1994)
- Adolescence revolution (1994)
- Blue Book / Aya Kokumai (1995) ISBN 4-255-95002-4
- Anna Umemiya's Diary of Love/Anna Umemiya, Kenji Haga (1995)
- AKI MIZUSAWA PHOTOGRAPHY 1975–1995 (1995)
- Oozumou (1995)
- Yukio Mishima's House (1995)
- Hinano ga Pyon Pyon/Hinano Yoshikawa (1995)
- 篠山紀信+宝生舞 kishin shinoyama + mai hosho (May, 1996) ISBN 4-255-96011-9
- one,two,three/Saki Takaoka (1996)
- Teihon sakka no shigotoba (1996)
- Tokyo secret meeting (1997)
- ERI ISHIDA 1979+NOW (1997)
- Shinwa shōjo・Chiaki Kuriyama (1997)
- Shōjo-tachi no Okinawa (1997)
- Shōjokan (1997)
- Ningen Kankei (1997)
- Bora Bora/Chiaki Hara (1997)
- GEKISHA in HAWAII (1998) ISBN 4-093-94585-3
- RIONA (1998) ISBN 4-821-12223-5
- ELLIROSE (1998)
- Accidents Series (1998–1999)

  1. Kanako Higuchi - 樋口可南子+篠山紀信 <Accidents series 1> – ISBN 4-255-98039-X
  2. Keiko Oginome - 荻野目慶子 + 篠山紀信 写真集 <Accidents series 2> – ISBN 4-255-98040-3
  3. Riona Hazuki - 葉月里緒菜 + 篠山紀信 写真集 <Accidents series 3> – ISBN 4-255-98041-1
  4. Harue Miyamoto - 宮本はるえ+篠山紀信 <Accidents series 4> – ISBN 4-255-98042-X
  5. Luna Nagai - 永井流奈+篠山紀信 <Accidents series 5> – ISBN 4-255-98043-8
  6. Rie Miyazawa – Santa Fe : 宮沢りえ New edition. - ISBN 4-255-99011-5
  7. Masahiro Motoki - 本木雅弘+篠山紀信 <Accidents series 7> – ISBN 4-255-99012-3
  8. Hinano Yoshikawa - 吉川ひなの+篠山紀信 <Accidents series 8> – ISBN 4-255-99013-1
  9. Yu Daiki - 大輝ゆう+篠山紀信 <Accidents series 9> – ISBN 4-255-99014-X
  10. Ami Koitabashi - 小板橋愛美+篠山紀信 <Accidents series 10> – ISBN 4-255-99015-8
  11. Saki Takaoka - 高岡早紀+篠山紀信 <Accidents series 11> – ISBN 4-255-99026-3
  12. Shinobu Otake - 大竹しのぶ+篠山紀信 <Accidents series 12> – ISBN 4-255-99027-1
  13. Mai Hosho - 宝生舞+篠山紀信 <Accidents series 13> – ISBN 4-255-99028-X
  14. Aya Kokumai - 国舞亜矢+篠山紀信 <Accidents series 14> – ISBN 4-255-99029-8
  15. Rico Morishita - 森下璃子+篠山紀信 <Accidents series 15> – ISBN 4-255-99030-1

- Shashin wa sensōda! Genba kara no senkyō hōkoku (1998)
- Sugita kaoru joyū-gokko (1998)
- VLADIMIR MALAKHOV (1998)
- NARCISSISME (1998)
- West by South・Hijiri Kojima (1999)
- Shōjo no yokubō・Sayaka Yoshino (1999)
- Man'no bijutsu (1999)
- HARUMI INOUE LIVE (1999)
- Accidents Tokyo Series (2000–2002)

  1. Accidents TOKYO しのぶ&シノヤマキシン  Shinobu & shinoyama kishin – ISBN 4-255-00029-8
  2. Accidents TOKYO レモン&シノヤマキシン Lemon & shinoyama kishin – ISBN 4-255-00030-1
  3. Accidents TOKYO MARIA&シノヤマキシン MARIA & shinoyama kishin – ISBN 4-255-00031-X
  4. Accidents TOKYO ナオ&リオ&シノヤマキシン Nao & Rio & shinoyama kishin – ISBN 4-255-00032-8
  5. Accidents TOKYO 貴子&シノヤマキシン Takako & shinoyama kishin – ISBN 4-255-00033-6
  6. Accidents TOKYO みゆき&シノヤマキシン  Miyuki & shinoyama kishin – ISBN 4-255-00056-5
  7. Accidents TOKYO AMI&シノヤマキシン AMI & shinoyamak ishin – ISBN 4-255-00057-3
  8. Accidents TOKYO めぐみ&シノヤマキシン  Megumi & shinoyama kishin – ISBN 4-255-00058-1
  9. Accidents TOKYO 美穂&シノヤマキシン Miho & shinoyama kishin – ISBN 4-255-00059-X
  10. Accidents TOKYO リカ&シノヤマキシン Rika & shinoyama kishin – ISBN 4-255-00060-3
  11. Accidents TOKYO けいこ&シノヤマキシン Keiko & shinoyama kishin – ISBN 4-255-00157-X
  12. Accidents TOKYO あやか&シノヤマキシン Ayaka & shinoyama kishin – ISBN 4-255-00158-8
  13. Accidents TOKYO あい&シノヤマキシン Ai & shinoyama kishin – ISBN 4-255-00159-6

- SIMON PYGMALIONISME (2000)
- NUEL LEGRIS OPERA DE PARIS (2000)
- Touch/Manno Art (2000)
- Ranman/Mai Oikawa (2000)
- DRIVE (2000)
- Idols (2000)
- THE PAINTER'S HOUSE (2001)
- The Kabuki (2001)
- MAIKO KAWAKAMI (2001)
- Hinanogachu~tsu?・Hinano Yoshikawa (2001) ISBN 4-255-00099-9
- mye/Mye Kitajima (2001)
- KISHIN TAKARAZUKA GRAPH (2002)
- BACKSTAGE (2002)
- 20XX TOKYO
- missmatch 堀北真希&黒木メイサ&シノヤマキシン Maki Horikita & Meisa Kuroki & Kishin Shonoyama (2006) ISBN 4-09-363705-9
- 杏南の日記 by KISHIN (2017) (Annie's Diary) ISBN 4-09-682256-6

== Discography ==
Field recordings

- 激写 Sounding Carib (1977)

== Awards ==
- Most Promising Young Photographer Prize (日本批評家協会新人賞, Nihon Hihyōka Kyōkai Shinjinshō) in 1966.
- Mainichi Art Prize (毎日芸術賞, Mainichi Geijutsushō) in 1980.
- Golden Eye Award in 1998.
