= Tetta Sugimoto =

Japanese actor (born 1965)

- 杉本 哲太
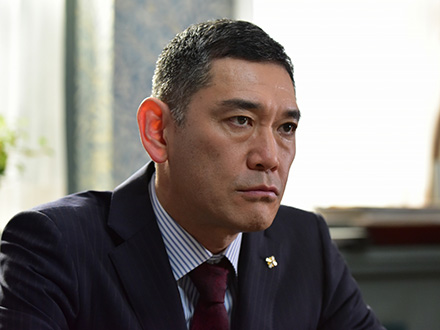
- Sugimoto in 2015
- Born: July 21, 1965 (age 61); Chigasaki, Kanagawa, Japan
- Occupation: Actor
- Years active: 1981–present
- Spouse: Hazuki Kōzu (m. 1992; div. 2026)

Tetta Sugimoto (杉本 哲太, Sugimoto Tetta; born 21 July 1965) is a Japanese actor.

== Career ==
Sugimoto was first a member of a rock band before he debuted as an actor in 1983 in the film Hakujasho. For that film, he won a Japan Academy Prize best newcomer award. In addition to his work in film, he has also acted on television, stage, and in television commercials.

He has appeared in films such as Takeshi Kitano's Outrage and Junji Sakamoto's Strangers in the City.

== Filmography ==
=== Film ===
- Hakujasho (1983)
- A Promise (1986)
- Zegen (1987)
- Sukeban Deka The Movie (1987)
- Hope and Pain (1988)
- Shikibu Monogatari (1990)
- Luminous Moss (1992)
- The River with No Bridge (1992)
- Tokyo Eyes (1998)
- Tokyo Rampage (1998)
- All About Lily Chou-Chou (2001)
- Waterboys (2001)
- Alive (2002)
- Samurai Resurrection (2003)
- Socrates in Love (2004)
- Reincarnation (2005)
- Pacchigi! Love & Peace (2007)
- Dororo (2007)
- Departures (2008)
- Ichi (2008)
- 252 (2008)
- John Rabe (2009)
- I Give My First Love to You (2009)
- Zero Focus (2009)
- Outrage (2010)
- Strangers in the City (2010)
- Night People (2013)
- Still the Water (2014)
- Erased (2016)
- The 8-Year Engagement (2017), Mai's father
- The Memory Eraser (2020)
- From Today, It's My Turn!! The Movie (2020)
- Signal the Movie (2021)
- Fullmetal Alchemist: The Revenge of Scar (2022)
- Akira and Akira (2022)
- Shylock's Children (2023), Kazuo Furukawa
- The Village (2023), Maruoka
- Eternal New Mornings (2023)
- Hard Days (2023)
- Kingdom 3: The Flame of Destiny (2023), Dao Jian
- Out (2023)
- Matched (2024)
- Dangerous Cops: Home Coming (2024), Yaginuma
- City Hunter (2024), Akitaka Ito
- 366 Days (2025), Kazuma Tamashiro
- A Girl & Her Guard Dog (2025), Tasuke Senagaki
- Golden Kamuy: The Abashiri Prison Raid (2026), Anji Toni

=== Television ===
- Kinjirareta Asobi (1995)
- The Abe Clan (1995)
- Water Boys (2003)
- Dark Tales of Japan (2004)
- Haruka Seventeen (2005)
- Kurosagi (2006)
- Hanazakari no Kimitachi e (2007)
- Barefoot Gen (2007)
- Code Blue (2008)
- Ryōmaden (2010)
- My Dog, My Happiness (2011)
- Man of Destiny (2012), Shigeru Araki
- Amachan (2013)
- The Emperor's Cook (2015)
- Naotora: The Lady Warlord (2017), Ii Naomori
- Idaten (2019), Dōmei Nagai
- Scams (2019)
- The Fugitive (2020), Mitsuhiko Miyajima
- Japan Sinks: People of Hope (2021), Shūya Naganuma
- Bakumatsu Aibō-den (2022), Nagai Naoyuki
- The 13 Lords of the Shogun (2022), Minamoto no Yukiie
- Teen Regime (2022), Masaki Sagawa
- Straight to Hell (2026)
- Lost and Found (2026), Hattori
