= Norihiko Hashida =

Japanese singer-songwriter

Norihiko Hashida はしだのりひこ

Background information
- Born: 7 January 1945
- Origin: Kyoto, Japan
- Died: 2 December 2017 (aged 72) Kyoto
- Occupation: Singer-songwriter
- Formerly of: The Folk Crusaders, Norihiko Hashida and the Shoebelts, Climax

Norihiko Hashida (はしだのりひこ; 7 January 1945 – 2 December 2017) was a Japanese singer-songwriter. His real name in kanji was 端田 宣彦, but he used the hiragana rendering of his name as his stage name.

Hashida was a Kyoto native and attended Doshisha University. He was invited to join The Folk Crusaders in 1967 and appeared with the band in the 1968 film Three Resurrected Drunkards before the group split. Hashida then led Norihiko Hashida and the Shoebelts until 1970. The song "Hanayome" performed by Norihiko Hashida and Climax reached number 1 on the Oricon Weekly Singles Chart from 15 February to 28 February 1971. Hashida died of Parkinson's disease aged 72, at a hospital in Kyoto.
