= Saori Minami =

Saori Minami 南 沙織
- Also known as: Cynthia
- Born: Akemi Uchima (内間 明美); July 2, 1954 (age 72); Kadena, Okinawa, USCAR
- Genres: J-pop; kayōkyoku
- Occupation: Singer
- Years active: 1971–1978; 1991–1997
- Label: CBS Sony
- Spouse: Kishin Shinoyama (m. 1979; died 2024)
- Website: www.sonymusic.co.jp/artist/SaoriMinami/

Akemi Shinoyama (篠山 明美, née Uchima (内間 明美); born July 2, 1954), known professionally as Saori Minami (南 沙織, Minami Saori), is a Japanese retired J-pop singer-songwriter. In the 1970s, and for about 6 years in 1991–1997 she was active as a pop musical idol.

== Biography ==
Minami was born in Okinawa on July 2, 1954. Her Christian name is Cynthia.

Minami debuted with the single "17-sai" ("17 Years Old") in the summer of 1971. The song reached the No. 2 position on the Oricon chart list. It was the 11th best selling single of 1971 in Japan and catapulted her into stardom. The song came about after composer Kyōhei Tsutsumi asked Minami what her favourite song was, Minami replied with "Rose Garden" by Lynn Anderson and so Tsutsumi based "17-sai" on that song.

Together with fellow Japanese female entertainers Rumiko Koyanagi and Mari Amachi, Minami laid the foundations of the modern Japanese idol. Minami, Koyanagi and Amachi were dubbed "The Three Girls" (三人娘, San nin musume). Before them, Hibari Misora, Chiemi Eri, and Izumi Yukimura were promoted in the same fashion. In 1973, Amachi, Koyanagi, and Minami were followed by Momoe Yamaguchi, Junko Sakurada and Masako Mori, who were known as "The Trio of Third-Year Middle School Blossoms".

Following the success of "17-sai", Minami was nominated for Best Newcomer of the Year at the 13th Japan Record Awards, but lost the title to Rumiko Koyanagi. She was invited to perform "17-sai" on the 22nd edition of Kōhaku Uta Gassen and eventually made 8 appearances on the show.

The two singles that followed "17-sai", "Shiokaze no Melody" (Melody of the Seabreeze) and "Tomodachi" (Friends), both reached the Oricon top 10. In the summer of 1972, "Junketsu" (Chastity) reached the #3 position on the Oricon charts and became one of her most successful singles. Its follow up, "Aishu no Page" (A Page Full of Sorrow), reached the same position and featured an intro spoken in English. In the spring of 1973 "Kizutsuku Sedai" (Wounded Generation) was released, a single with Rock 'N' Roll influences which cracked the top 5. In the summer of that same year "Irozuku Machi" (Painted City) became one of her biggest successes and, according to Minami herself, "[was] one of my most representative songs". She continued to release popular singles throughout the 1970s (most notably "Hito Kakera No Junjou" (A Little Naive) and "Hito Koishi Kute" (A Wonderful Person).

Minami retired from show business in 1978. She reappeared for a few mini-CD singles and live performances from 1991–1997, before returning to retirement.

== Personal life ==
Minami is married to photographer Kishin Shinoyama, and has a son, Akinobu Shinoyama. She graduated from The American School in Japan in 1974, took English classes at Sophia University, and in her performing years, she sang many folk/pop songs in English, and at one point travelled to Los Angeles, California to record her album Cynthia Street. At the time, Minami had strict coaching to improve her diction in English, which she was speaking at an intermediate level. In addition to English, Minami also learned to speak Spanish at an intermediate level.

Minami is a Roman Catholic, and at times during her singing career was also billed by her baptismal name Cynthia.

== Partial discography ==
=== Singles ===
#	Title	Release date/chart position
1	17-sai (Jūnana-sai) (17才, Seventeen Years Old); Debut single and biggest hit	1971-06-01 (#2)
2	Shiokaze no MELODY (潮風のメロディ, Melody of the Seabreeze)	1971-10-01 (#7)
3	Tomodachi (ともだち, Friends)	1972-02-01 (#7)
4	Junketsu (純潔, Chastity)	1972-06-01 (#3)
5	Aishuu No PAGE (哀愁のページ, A Page Full of Sorrow)	1972-09-21 (#3)
6	Soushun No Minato (早春の港, Harbour in the Early Spring)	1973-01-23 (#11)
7	Kizutsuku Sedai (傷つく世代, Wounded Generation)	1973-05-01 (#3)
8	Irozuku Machi (色づく街, A Painted City)	1973-08-21 (#4)
9	Hito Kakera No Junjou (ひとかけらの純情, A Little Naive)	1973-12-05 (#8)
10	Bara No Kageri (バラのかげり, Total Eclipse of the Rose)	1974-03-21 (#15)
11	Natsu No Kanjou (夏の感情, Summer Feelings)	1974-06-21 (#16)
12	Yogiri No Machi (夜霧の街, The City of the Mist)	1974-09-21 (#17)
13	Hito Koishi Kute (人恋しくて, A Wonderful Person)	1975-08-01 (#8)
14	Hitonemuri (ひとねむり, Sleeping People)	1975-11-21 (#27)
15	Kiga Mukeba Denwa Shite (気がむけば電話して, Call Me When You Get That Feeling)	1976-03-01 (#29)
16	Kanashii Yousei (哀しい妖精, The Sad Fairy)	1976-09-1 (#20)
17	Machikado No LOVE SONG (街角のラブソング, A Street Love Song)	1977-07-21 (#36)
18	Haru No Yokan ~I'VE BEEN MELLOW~ (気がむけば電話して, Premonition of the Spring)	1978-01-21 (#25)
19	GOODBYE GIRL (グッバイガール)	1978-10-21 (#-)

=== Studio albums ===
#	Title	Release date/chart position
1	17sai (17才); Debut album	1971-10-01 (#8)
2	Junketsu/Tomodachi (純潔／ともだち)	1972-06-21 (#2)
3	Aishuu No PAGE (哀愁のページ)	1972-09-21 (#4)
4	Kizutsuku Sedai (傷つく世代)	1973-05-21 (#9)
5	Hatachi Mae (20才まえ)	1973-09-21 (#5)
6	Hito Kakera no Junjou (ひとかけらの純情)	1974-02-21 (#6)
7	Natsu No Kanjou (夏の感情)	1974-07-21 (#7)
8	Nin Koishi Kute (人恋しくて)	1975-12-05 (#19)
9	Sugao No Mama De (素顔のままで)	1976-04-21 (#20)
10	Kanashii Yousei (哀しい妖精)	1976-09-21 (#19)
11	HELLO! CYNTHIA (-)	1977-08-21 (#29)
12	SIMPLICITY (-)	1978-10-01 (#37)

=== EPs ===
#	Title	Release date
1	CYNTHIA no Christmas (シンシアのクリスマス)	1975-11-21

=== Live albums ===
#	Title	Release date/chart position
1	CYNTHIA IN CONCERT (-); First live album	1974-09-01 (#5)
2	SAORI ON STAGE (潮風のメロディ)	1977-12-05 (#74)
3	Sayonara CYNTHIA (さよならシンシア); Goodbye concert	1978-12-05 (#-)

=== Compilations ===
#	Title	Release date/chart position
1	Minami Saori Pops Wo Utau (南沙織 ポップスを歌う); First best of album	1975-02-21 (#40)
2	Minami Saori No Subete (南沙織のすべて)	1983-11-05 (#-)
3	Minami Saori BEST SELECTION (ベスト・コレクション 南沙織)	1986-05-21 (#-)
4	Minami Saori BEST RECALL ~28 SINGLES SAORI +1~ (-)	1992-02-21 (#-)
5	Cynthia BEST ~ ETERNITY (-)	1996-06-21 (#-)
6	DREAM PRICE 1000 Minami Saori Iro Zuku Machi (DREAM PRICE 1000 南沙織 色づく街)	2001-10-11 (#-)
7	GOLDEN BEST Minami Saori Tsutsumi Kyouhei wo Utau (GOLDEN☆BEST 南沙織 筒美京平を歌う)	2002-06-19 (#-)
8	Minami Saori THE BEST ~Cynthia-ly (南沙織 THE BEST 〜 Cynthia-ly)	2003-11-19 (#-)
9	Minami Saori BEST OF BEST (南沙織 BEST OF BEST)	2006-09-21 (#-)
