= Children Who Don't Know War =

Single by Jiros
- Released: February 5, 1971 (JP)
- Recorded: 1970
- Genre: Japanese Pop
- Label: Toshiba EMI
- Songwriters: Osamu Kitayama, Jirō Sugita

"Children Who Don't Know War" (戦争を知らない子供たち, Sensō o Shiranai Kodomo-tachi) is a 1971 single released by the Japanese duo Jiros. Released on February 5, 1971, it ranked eleventh in Oricon charts, selling a total of 196,000 copies. The song was adapted into a movie with the same name in 1973.

== Background ==
In the early 1970s, when "Children Who Don't Know War" was released, the United States of America found itself in the midst of the Vietnam War. Though Japan wasn't directly involved in the conflict, the country allowed the stationing of American troops on Japanese soil, a decision which was met with internal criticism coming mainly from the country's intellectual elite, composed of academics and students, who upheld deep rooted anti-war beliefs, mainly due to Japan's experience during World War II.

The song was composed to express a mild anti-war message, but it was later regarded by Kitayama as a puerile effort to satirize, and rebel against, the contempt felt by older generations who experienced World War II for younger people born in the post-war period – who were denounced for weak-mindedness and lack of self-discipline. Though the duo never bore any affiliation to the pacifist movement, the song became indelibly attached to the movement, and its title became an iconic expression, used in sports, anime, magazines, books and newspaper articles.

== Track listings ==
- A side – "Children Who Don't Know War" (「戦争を知らない子供たち」)
  - Lyrics: Osamu Kitayama (北山修), Composition: Jirō Sugita (杉田二郎), Arrangement: Toshikazu Makaino (馬飼野俊一)
- B side – "Peace Peace For The Love & You" (「愛とあなたのために」)
  - Lyrics: Osamu Kitayama (北山修), Composition: Jirō Sugita (杉田二郎), Arrangement: Toshikazu Makaino (馬飼野俊一)

== See also ==
- 1971 in Japanese music
