= Mari Amachi =

Japanese musician and actress (born 1951)

Mari Amachi 天地 真理
- Born: Mari Saito; November 5, 1951 (age 74); Omiya, Saitama Prefecture, Japan
- Genres: J-pop, Idol pop
- Occupations: Singer, actress
- Instruments: Vocals, piano
- Years active: 1971–1983, 1979-present (Fan Club Activity)
- Label: Sony Music Entertainment Japan

Mari Amachi (天地 真理, Amachi Mari; born November 5, 1951) is a Japanese female singer and actress, who was famous in 1970s' Japan. On October 1, 1971, she debuted with the single "Mizuiro no Koi." She was born as Mari Saito in Omiya, Saitama Prefecture. She got five Oricon No.1 songs, a record as a female singer which was later broken by Seiko Matsuda. She started the era of Japanese idols in the 1970s and 1980s. Mari Amachi was the top female vocalist of Sony Music Entertainment in Japan.

== Biography ==
While Amachi was still in elementary school, her mother taught her how to play the piano. In 1964 she attended Junior High School attached to Kunitachi College of Music located in Kunitachi, Tokyo, where she studied piano and vocals. She graduated from High School attached to the college mentioned above in March 1970.

Mari Amachi debuted in October 1971 with the single "Mizuiro No Koi". She was promoted alongside Rumiko Koyanagi and Saori Minami, and they were dubbed the "San-Nin Musume" (Three young girls). Before them, Hibari Misora, Chiemi Eri and Izumi Yukimura were promoted in the same fashion. In 1973, Amachi, Koyanagi and Minami were followed by Momoe Yamaguchi, Junko Sakurada and Masako Mori, who were known as "Hana No Chu 3 Trio" (The Trio of Third-Year Junior High School Students).

Mari Amachi proved to be a huge success in Japan. She was one of the first Japanese singers to be deemed an "idol". Her single "Chiisana Koi" was the first of five number 1 hits on the Oricon chart list. No other female Japanese entertainer had achieved this, yet her record was broken by Pink Lady in the late 70s and their record was subsequently broken by Seiko Matsuda in the 80s. At the 15th Japan Record Awards the single Wakaba No Sasayaki won the award for best musical arrangement of the year, and at the 6th Japan Record Sales Award the song was awarded with a gold medal. She was the second best selling Japanese artist in 1972 and 1973.

By the summer of 1972, her single "Hitori Janai No" had sold over 600,000 copies and proved to be her second #1, and she was invited to perform on the 23d edition of Kōhaku Uta Gassen. That same year Mari Amachi starred in her own television series, "The Mari Amachi Show", which was aired by TBS from 1972 up to 1975. The following year, Mari Amachi and fellow idol Hiromi Go were reported to be responsible for grossing more than $45 million for Sony Music Entertainment. She was dubbed "Sony's Snow White".

Mari Amachi also performed on the 24th edition of Kōhaku Uta Gassen, as well as the 25th.

Apart from being a singer, Mari Amachi was also an actress.

In 1977 Mari Amachi withdrew from public life citing thyroid problems, although she later admitted she was suffering from a depression. In 1979 she returned to showbusiness, and was welcomed back with a large press party at CBS Sony's recording studio. Her record sales declined sharply, and she released her last single in 1983.

By the end of 2015, Mari Amachi was reported to live in a retirement home. As of 2021, she is active in the Fan Club.

== Discography ==
=== Top 10 singles ===
#	Title	Release date/chart position	Sales	Cumulative
1	Mizuiro No Koi (水色の恋 Love in Blue); Debut single	1971-10-01 (#3)	423,000	800,000
2	Chiisana Koi (ちいさな恋 A Petite Love)	1972-02-05 (#1)	547,000	900,000
3	Hitori Janai No (ひとりじゃないの Your Smile, My tears)	1972-05-21 (#1)	601,000	1.100,000
4	Niji Wo Watatte (虹をわたって Bridge of A Rainbow)	1972-09-01 (#1)	517,000	1,000,000
5	Futari No Nichiyobi (ふたりの日曜日 Going out on Sunday)	1972-12-05 (#3)	447,000	1,000,000
6	Wakaba No Sasayaki (若葉のささやき Whispering Green Leaves)	1973-03-21 (#1)	481,000	1,100,000
7	Koisuru Natsu No Hi (恋する夏の日 Summer Days of Love); Signature song	1973-07-01 (#1)	502,000	1,100,000
8	Sora Ippai No Shiawase (空いっぱいの幸せ A Sky Full of Happiness)	1973-10-21 (#3)	241,000	Unknown
9	Koibito Tachi No Minato (恋人たちの港 Harbour of the Lovers)	1974-02-01 (#4)	212,000	Unknown
10	Koi To Umi To T-SHIRT To (恋と海とTシャツと Love and the Sea and a T-Shirt)	1974-06-01 (#8)	157,000	Unknown
11	Omoide No SERENADE (想い出のセレナーデ A Serenade of Memories)	1974-09-01 (#4)	324,000	Unknown

=== Top 10 Albums ===
#	Title	Release date/chart position
1	Mizuiro No Koi (水色の恋 Love in Blue); Debut album	1971 (#1)
2	Chiisana Koi (ちいさな恋 A Petite Love)	1972(#1)
3	Gift Pack Mari Amachi (ギフト・パック 天地真理); Best of	1972(#1)
4	Niji Wo Watatte (虹をわたって Bridge of A Rainbow)	1972 (#2)
5	Ashita He No MELODY (明日へのメロディー Melody Of Tomorrow)	1972 (#1)
6	Wakaba No Sasayaki (若葉のささやき Whispering Green Leaves)	1973 (#1)
7	Koisuru Natsu No Hi (恋する夏の日 Summer Days Of Love)	1973 (#3)

== Kōhaku Uta Gassen appearances ==
Year	#	Song	No.	VS	Remarks
1972 (Showa 47)/23rd	1	Hitori janai no(ひとりじゃないの)	1/23	Shinichi Mori	Top Batter
1973 (Showa 48)/24th	2	Koisuru Natsu No Hi (恋する夏の日)	14/22	Nishikino Akira	
1974 (Showa 49)/25th	3	Omoide No Serenade (想い出のセレナーデ)	18/25	Hiroshi Uchiyamada and Cool Five	
