= Rumiko Koyanagi =

Japanese actress and singer

- 小柳 ルミ子
- Born: July 2, 1952 (age 73); Fukuoka, Fukuoka, Japan
- Occupations: Actress, singer

Rumiko Koyanagi (小柳ルミ子, Koyanagi Rumiko), formerly known as Rumi Natsukawa (夏川るみ, Natsukawa Rumi) during her Takarazuka Revue days, is a Japanese actress and singer. She began her career as a member of Takarazuka Revue. She won the award for best new artist at the 13th Japan Record Awards and won the Japan Music Award in 1972. She won the award for best supporting actress at the 6th Japan Academy Prize for To Trap a Kidnapper and the award for best actress at the 7th Japan Academy Prize for Hakujasho.

== Musical accomplishments ==
Rumiko Koyanagi debuted in 1971 with the single "Watashi no Jyokamachi" ("My Castle Town"), which reached the No. 1 position on the Oricon charts and sold nearly 2 million copies. She was awarded "Best Newcomer" at the 13th Japan Record Awards and the 2nd Japan Music Awards. She performed for the first time at the 22nd edition of Kōhaku Uta Gassen and eventually made 18 consecutive appearances on the show.

She was promoted alongside Mari Amachi and Saori Minami, and they were dubbed the "San-Nin Musume" (Three young girls). Before them, Hibari Misora, Chiemi Eri and Izumi Yukimura were promoted in the same fashion. In 1973, Amachi, Koyanagi and Minami were followed by Momoe Yamaguchi, Junko Sakurada and Masako Mori, who were known as "Hana No Chu 3 Trio" (The Trio of Third-Year Junior High School Students).

Her second single, "O Matsuri no Yoru" ("Night of the Festival"), sold over 500,000 copies and reached the No. 2 position on the charts. In April 1972 the single "Seto no Hanayome" ("The Bride of Seto"), became her second No. 1 hit. The single went on to sell more than 800,000 copies. For this song, she was awarded the Grand Prize at the 3d edition of the Japan Music Awards and a popularity award at the 14th edition of the Japan Record Awards. The follow-up single, "Kyo no Niwaka Ame" ("Kyoto's Rain Shower"), became her third No. 1 hit. Several hit singles were released throughout 1973, and in the winter of 1974 the single "Fuyu no Eki" ("The Winter Station"), would prove to be her 4th No. 1 single. Her last big hit was produced in 1983. "O Hisashi Burine" ("It's Been a Long Time"), reached the No. 8 position on the Oricon chart list.

Apart from being a singer, Rumiko Koyanagi is also an actress.

== Filmography ==
Films

- To Trap a Kidnapper (1982)
- Hakujasho (1983)

Television

- Segodon (2018), Oyura

== Discography ==
=== Top 10 singles ===
#	Title	Date/Position
1	Watashi no Jyokamachi (わたしの城下町 My Castle Town); Debut single	1971 (#1)
2	O Matsuri no Yoru (お祭りの夜 Night of the Festival)	1971 (#2)
3	Yuki Akari no Machi (雪あかりの町 City of Snow Light)	1972 (#5)
4	Seto no Hanayome (瀬戸の花嫁 Bride of Seto)	1972 (#1)
5	Kyo no Niwaka Ame (京のにわか雨 Kyoto's Rain Shower)	1972 (#1)
6	Isibari Koi Uta (漁火恋唄 Isibari Love Song)	1972 (#3)
7	Haru no Otozure (春のおとずれ Coming of Spring)	1973 (#4)
8	Koi ni Yurete (恋にゆれて Swaying in Love)	1973(#4)
9	Juuyoga no Kimi (十五夜の君 You and the Full Moon)	1973 (#8)
10	Fuyu no Eki (冬の駅 Winter Station)	1974 (#1)
11	Hoshi no Suna (星の砂 Stars of Sand)	1977 (#2)
12	O Hisashi Burine (お久しぶりね It's Been a Long Time)	1983 (#8)

Preceded by Akira Nishikino	Japan Record Award for Best New Artist; 1971	Succeeded by Megumi Asaoka
