= Kiyohiko Ozaki =

Japanese singer

Kiyohiko Ozaki 尾崎紀世彦
- Born: 1 January 1943; Shibuya, Tokyo, Japan
- Origin: Chigasaki, Kanagawa Prefecture, Japan
- Died: 30 May 2012 (aged 69) Minato, Tokyo, Japan
- Genres: Pop
- Occupations: Singer, actor
- Years active: 1960–2012

Kiyohiko Ozaki (尾崎紀世彦, Ozaki Kiyohiko; 1 January 1943 – 30 May 2012) (nickname Kieyo) was a Japanese singer and actor. Known for his booming singing voice and trademark sideburns, he was sometimes referred to as the Japanese Tom Jones.

Ozaki was born in Tokyo and grew up in neighbouring Kanagawa prefecture. He started performing in bands at the age of 13, before making his solo debut in 1970. His greatest hit was his 1971 single "Mata au hi made" (Until the Day We Meet Again). He died of liver cancer on 30 May 2012 after a long hospitalisation.

== Early life ==
Ozaki was born in Tokyo’s Shibuya Ward, the second of three sons born to Shigeru Ozaki (stage name Shigeru Fujita) and Reiko Ozaki. His parents were both ballet dancers, as was his elder brother Akihiko. His paternal grandfather, Henry Buckingham Lucas, was British, making Ozaki one-quarter British.

He grew up listening to the American military radio station FEN, where he gained an appreciation of jazz and country music. After attending Heiwa Gakuen Elementary School and Fujisawa City Tsujidō Elementary School, he graduated from Chigasaki First Municipal Junior High School and went on to the YMCA International College of Hospitality.

== Music career ==
=== The band years ===
After receiving a ukelele from his father at the age of 13, Ozaki learned to play it from a book and formed a Hawaiian band called the Hilo Hawaiians (1960–1964) with five of his junior high school classmates. The band successfully auditioned for a band contest held by the Hakone Kowakien Hotel, and subsequently made their semi-professional debut when Ozaki was 17 years old. In 1964, the band achieved their dream of appearing at the Nichigeki Theater, and disbanded soon after due to scheduling differences and the demands of the members’ academic and family lives.

In 1965, Ozaki joined the group Jimmie Tokita and his Mountain Playboys as guitarist and second vocal and would perform with them until 1966. Bandmate Shintaro Ishida would later play on Ozaki’s 1973 album Kieyo Sings Country Favorites. Jimmie Tokida moved to the United States in 1967 to pursue a musical career there, and so in January of that year, Ozaki formed the chorus group The Wonders along with Toshio Oguri and Kōichi Asa.

The Wonders released covers of Western songs as well as television theme songs, and made appearances on pop-music programmes on NHK and TBS. They would also record the theme song and other music for the television series Ultraseven under the name The Wonders. Ozaki’s Wonders bandmates would later contribute backing vocals to his hit song "Mata au hi made" (Until the Day We Meet Again).

=== Solo career ===
==== 1970s ====
Thanks to the keen interest of producer Mamoru Murakami at the record label Nichion, Ozaki made his solo debut on 25 August 1970, with the single Wakare no Yoake (Parting at dawn) (Philips Records, later part of Universal Music Group). As a result of Ozaki going solo, The Wonders leader Toshio Oguri retired from singing and became Ozaki’s director at Nichion.

Ozaki’s dynamic vocal style initially caused a stir in the music industry, but he was unable to promote the record due to being hospitalised the month after its release as a result of injuries sustained in a six-car pileup involving the taxi in which he was a passenger. Ozaki remained in hospital from September 1970 through to April 1971, and the single was a commercial failure.

Throughout 1971, Ozaki had a series of hit singles with "Mata au hi made" (Until the Day We Meet Again), "Sayonara wo mou ichido" (Goodbye Once More), "Yuki ga furu" (The Snow Falls, a cover of "Tombe la neige") and "Koi suru hito wa hitori" (I Love Only One). The same year, he performed a one-man show in his hometown of Chigasaki, and his first ever solo concert in Osaka.

"Mata au hi made" sold over a million copies and won the Japan Record Award at the 13th Japan Record Awards as well as the Japan Music Award. The scenes of him holding up the Japan Record Awards trophy, smiling and flashing the "V sign", as well as the subsequent live performance, are still played on television to this day.

That same year, Ozaki made his debut on the 22nd annual Kōhaku uta Gassen contest as the lead performer for the male white team. After scoring more hits in 1972 with his singles Futari ha wakakatta (We were young), こころの炎燃やしただけで (Just by blazing the flame in my heart) and あなたに賭ける (I bet on you), he would appear on the contest's 23rd edition singing a cover version of the Love Theme from The Godfather with Japanese lyrics. He later went on to take part a further time in 1990 for the contest’s 41st edition.

In 1979, Ozaki released his 23rd single, My Better Life, and appeared on various television music programmes including Music Fair and Sound in S. He continued to perform his repertoire of film music and jazz on programmes such as Seishun no Pops, Tokimeki Yume Sound and Miwaku no Standard Pops.

==== 1980s and 1990s ====
His 1987 release Summer Love was a smash hit. Starting in 1994, he would make guest appearances on the music variety programme later known as The Night of Hit Parade.

In 1995, Ozaki performed a concert celebrating the 25th anniversary of his solo debut. That same year, his enthusiastic performance of 燃えろ!ガリバーボーイ (Ignite! Gulliver Boy), the theme song for the television anime Gulliver Boy, introduced him to a new generation of younger fans.

=== Final years and death ===
From 2007 onwards, Ozaki regularly performed in orchestra-backed pop concerts, and performed solo "premium concerts" starting in February 2010. However, in April 2011, the concert organizers announced that the performances scheduled for the following May would be cancelled while Ozaki "recuperated from illness". In May 2012, relatives confirmed that, as had been widely speculated in the media, Ozaki had been in hospital for over a year. He died of cancer of the liver in a Tokyo hospital on 30 May 2012, at the age of 69.

=== Post-mortem accolades ===
On 2 September 2012, a memorial was held in Ozaki's honor at the Hotel Okura in Tokyo, attended by lifelong friends from the music industry. He was posthumously awarded a Special Achievement Award at the 54th Japan Record Awards on 30 December 2012, and was entered into the Popular Music Hall of Fame on 1 October 2013.

== Personal life ==
Ozaki was married twice, divorcing both times. He remained in contact with family from his first marriage, who cared for him during his final illness.

His interests included surfing, which he started as an elementary school student, as well as horseback riding, participating in festivals as a mikoshi bearer, collecting and touring Harley Davidson motorcycles, driving classic Mercedes-Benz cars, yachting, scuba diving in Okinawa, shooting, silverworking and collecting silver accessories, and cookery. He loved motorcycles and first obtained a license at the age of 16.

== Filmography ==
Year	Title	Role	Notes
1977	House	Keisuke Tôgô	
1985	Hoshikuzu kyôdai no densetsu	Atomic Minami	
1986	His Motorbike, Her Island	Murata	
2005	Tsuribaka nisshi 16		(final film role)
