= Kaori Takahashi (actress) =

Japanese actress

Kaori Takahashi (高橋かおり Takahashi Kaori; born August 29, 1975, in Kanagawa Prefecture, Japan) is a Japanese actress. She starred in the 2003 Fuji TV adaptation of Kuni Arisaka's novel Happiness in Bloom (Shiawase saita), and played supporting roles in the 1986 NHK series Musashibō Benkei and the 1994 TV Asahi series Troublesome Teacher (Sensei wa wagamama). In 2009 she appeared in the lead role in Christmas Miracle (Xmasの奇蹟, XMas no kiseki), her third lead role for Fuji TV after Shiawase saita and the 2005 drama Dangerous Liaisons (危険な関係, Kiken na kankei).
