= Polydextrose =

Synthetic polymer of glucose

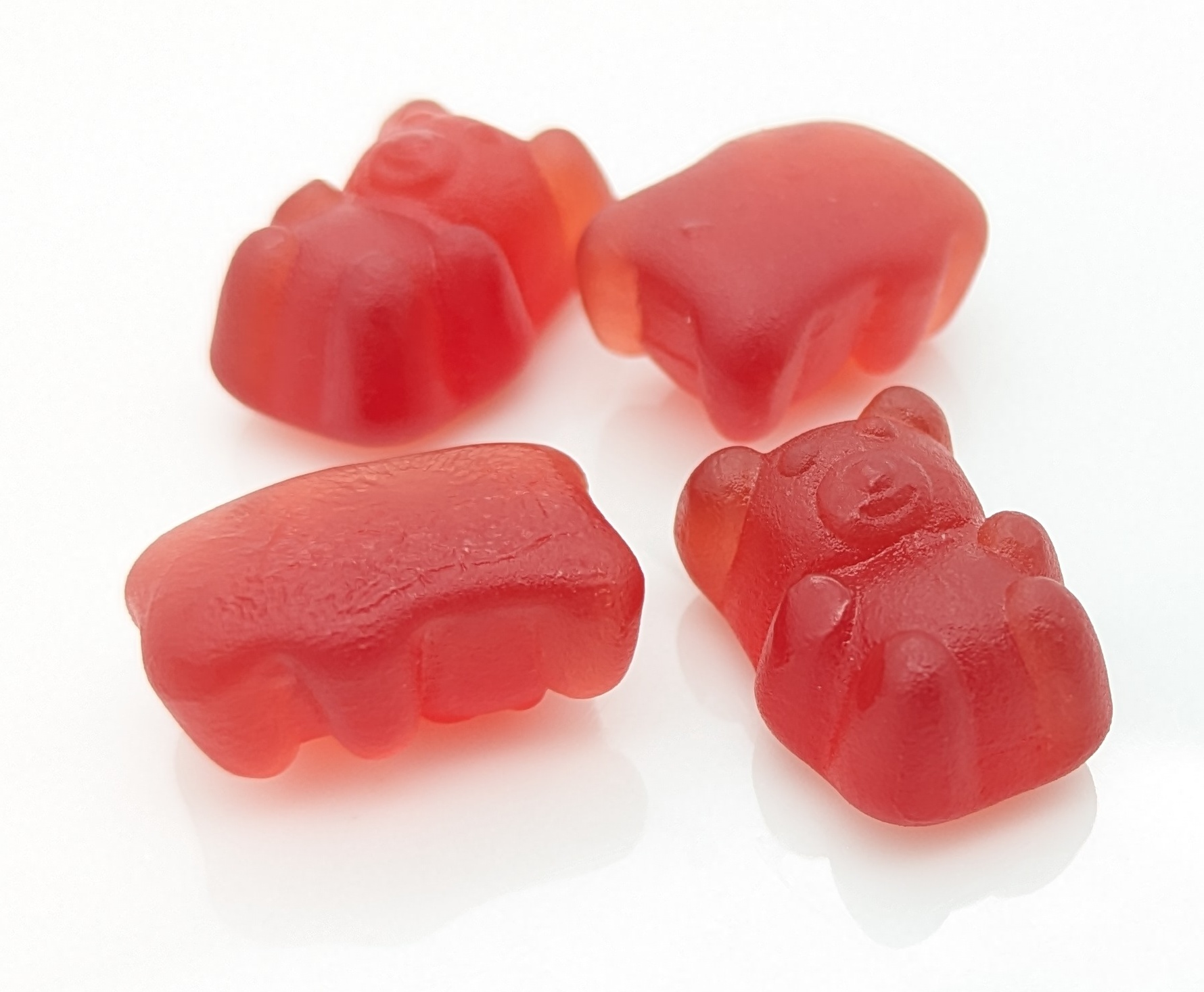
Gummy bears made with polydextrose

Polydextrose is a synthetic polymer of glucose. It is a food ingredient classified as soluble fiber by the US FDA as well as Health Canada, as of April 2013. It is frequently used to increase the dietary fiber content of food, to replace sugar, and to reduce calories and fat content. It is a multi-purpose food ingredient synthesized from dextrose (glucose), plus about 10 percent sorbitol and 1 percent citric acid. Its E number is E1200. The FDA approved it in 1981.

It is one-tenth as sweet as sugar.

== History ==
Commercial development of polydextrose began at Pfizer Central Research Laboratories in the late 1960s. Hans H. Rennhard created the material during research on low-calorie bulking agents made from glucose, sorbitol, and citric acid. Pfizer patented the process in 1973 through United States Patent 3,766,165. The U.S. Food and Drug Administration approved polydextrose as a food additive in 1981 under 21 CFR 172.841.

== Commercial uses ==
Polydextrose is commonly used as a replacement for sugar, starch, and fat in commercial beverages, cakes, candies, dessert mixes, breakfast cereals, gelatins, frozen desserts, puddings, and salad dressings. Polydextrose is frequently used as an ingredient in low-carb, sugar-free, and diabetic cooking recipes. It is also used as a humectant, stabiliser, and thickening agent.

Polydextrose is a form of soluble fiber and has shown healthful prebiotic benefits when tested in animals. It contains only 1 kcal per gram, and it therefore also helps to reduce calories.

However, polydextrose is not universally well tolerated. Doses as low as 10 g cause significantly more intestinal gas and flatulence than fermentation resistant psyllium.
