= Ouyang Fei Fei =

Ouyang Fei Fei 歐陽菲菲
- Born: September 10, 1949 (age 76)
- Origin: Taipei, Taiwan
- Genres: Pop, kayōkyoku, soul
- Occupations: Singer, Idol
- Years active: 1967-present
- Spouse: Sokichi Shikiba (m. 1978; died 2016)
- Website: feifei.jp
- Relatives: Ouyang Nana (niece)

Chinese name
- Traditional Chinese: 歐陽菲菲
- Simplified Chinese: 欧阳菲菲
Transcriptions
Standard Mandarin
- Hanyu Pinyin: Ōuyáng Fēifēi
- Bopomofo: ㄡ ㄧㄤˊ ㄈㄟ ㄈㄟ
- Gwoyeu Romatzyh: Ouyang Feifei
- Wade–Giles: Ouyang Feifei

Japanese name
- Kanji: 欧陽菲菲
- Hiragana: おーやん・ふぃーふぃー
- Katakana: オーヤン・フィーフィー

Ouyang Fei Fei (Chinese: 歐陽菲菲; pinyin: Ōuyáng Fēifēi; Japanese: 欧陽菲菲; Romaji: Ōyan Fīfī; born September 10, 1949) is a Taiwanese-Japanese singer.

== Biography ==
In 1967, Ouyang Fei Fei made her musical debut at the Central Hotel, a theatre in Taipei, before coming to Japan to start a recording career. Her debut single "Ame no Midōsuji" (Rainy Midōsuji), released in September 1971, sold over a million units and reached the No. 1 position on the Oricon charts. The song was composed by The Ventures with lyrics written by Haruo Hayashi. The same year, she won the Best Newcomer prize at the 13th Japan Record Awards.

Her second Japanese single release, "Ame no Airport" (Rainy airport), reached the No. 4 position on the Oricon charts and sold nearly 400,000 copies. The song won her the Grand Prize at the 5th Japan Cable Awards.

In 1982, Ouyang released "Love Is Over" as a single in Japan. It had first been released as the B-side to her single "Uwasa no Disco Queen" (Disco Queen rumors), which only sold about 3,000 units. "Love Is Over" reached the No. 1 position on the Oricon charts, selling over half a million units. At the 25th edition of the Japan Record Awards, "Love Is Over" won her the Long Seller prize.

Ouyang appeared three times on Kōhaku Uta Gassen. The first time was in 1972, performing "Koi no Tsuiseki" (Love chase). The second time in 1973, performing "Koi no Jūjiro" (The crossroads of love), and one final time in 1991, performing "Love Is Over".

In April 1978 Ouyang married Sokichi Shikiba, a former Japanese racing driver. They were married until his death in 2016.

== Discography ==
=== Charted singles in Japan ===
#	Title	Release Date/Charts
1	Ame no Midōsuji (雨の御堂筋, Rainy Midōsuji); Debut single	1971-09-05 (#1)
2	Ame no Airport (雨のエアポート, Rainy Airport)	1971-12-20 (#4)
3	Koi no Tsuiseki (恋の追跡, Love Chase)	1972-04-05 (#5)
4	Yogisha (夜汽車, Night Train)	1972-08-05 (#5)
5	Ame no Yokohama (雨のヨコハマ, Rainy Yokohama)	1972-12-20 (#18)
6	Koi no Jūjiro (恋の十字路, The Crossroads of Love)	1973-04-05 (#9)
7	Koi Wa Moete Iru (恋は燃えている, Burning Love)	1973-08-20 (#38)
8	Hi no Tori (火の鳥, Phoenix)	1973-12-01 (#69)
9	Love Is Over	1982-09-01 (#1)

=== Japanese studio albums ===
#	Title	Date
1	Ame no Midōsuji (雨の御堂筋, Rainy Midōsuji); Debut album	1971
2	Koi no Jūjiro (恋の十字路, Crossroads of Love)	1972
3	Hi no Tori (火の鳥, Phoenix)	1973
4	Return	1979
5	Still Stay in Love	1981
6	My Love Again	1983
7	Both Sides	1984
8	Twilight City	1985
9	Remembrance	1986
10	Romantic Asia	1989
11	Orthodox	1991

== Kōhaku Uta Gassen Appearances ==
Year	#	Song	No.	VS	Remarks
1972 (Showa 47)/23rd	1	Koi No Tsuiseki/Love Chase (恋の追跡/ラヴ・チェイス)	15/23	Tsunehiko Kamijō	
1973 (Showa 48)/24th	2	Koi No Jūjiro (恋の十字路)	16/22	Kenji Sawada	
1991 (Heisei 3)/42nd	3	Love Is Over (ラヴ・イズ・オーヴァー)	5/28	The Ventures	Returned after 18 years
