= Pink Lady discography =

- Studio albums: 7 (Note: This includes the cover albums.)
- Live albums: 8
- Compilation albums: 8
- Singles: 26
- Video albums: 11 (Note: This includes the music video compilation albums and concert DVDs.)
- Box sets: 3
- Remix albums: 3
- Soundtracks: 1
- Karaoke albums: 3
- Tribute albums: 1

The discography of the Japanese duo Pink Lady consists of six studio albums, twelve compilation albums, and twenty six singles released since 1976.

== Albums ==
=== Studio albums ===
Year	Information	Oricon weekly peak position	Sales	RIAJ certification
1977	Pepper Keibu: Released: January 25, 1977; Label: Victor Entertainment; Formats: LP, cassette, 8-track	2	140,000 (Note: Sales include the cassette and 8-track versions released as Pink Lady wo Dōzo.)	
1978	Hoshi kara Kita Futari: Released: November 5, 1978; Label: Victor Entertainment; Formats: LP, cassette, 8-track	10	46,000	
1979	Magical Music Tour: Released: February 5, 1979; Label: Victor Entertainment; Formats: LP, cassette, 8-track	27	18,000	
1979	Pink Lady; Pink Lady in the USA: Released: June 1, 1979 (U.S.) / September 5, 1979 (Japan); Label: Elektra Records/Curb Records (U.S.) / Victor Entertainment (Japan); Formats: LP, cassette, 8-track	30	17,000	
1979	We Are Sexy: Released: December 1, 1979; Label: Victor Entertainment; Formats: LP, cassette, 8-track	52	12,000	
1984	Suspense ~Pink Lady Again~: Released: June 21, 1984; Label: VAP; Formats: LP, cassette, CD	—		

=== Cover albums ===
Year	Information	Oricon weekly peak position	Sales	RIAJ certification
2010	Innovation: Released: December 1, 2010; Label: Victor Entertainment; Formats: CD, digital	89		

=== Live albums ===
Year	Information	Oricon weekly peak position	Sales	RIAJ certification
1977	Challenge Concert: Released: June 5, 1977; Label: Victor Entertainment; Formats: LP, cassette	1	160,000	
1977	Summer Fire '77: Released: September 10, 1977; Label: Victor Entertainment; Formats: LP, cassette	2	130,000	
1978	Bye Bye Carnival: Released: March 5, 1978; Label: Victor Entertainment; Formats: LP, cassette	5	94,000	
1978	America! America! America!: Released: June 25, 1978; Label: Victor Entertainment; Formats: LP, cassette	6	80,000	
1978	'78 Jumping Summer Carnival: Released: September 5, 1978; Label: Victor Entertainment; Formats: LP, cassette	12	48,000	
1979	Live in Budoukan: Released: February 5, 1979; Label: Victor Entertainment; Formats: LP, cassette	24	16,000	
1980	World Song Festival in Seoul '80: Released: 1980; Label: Hyundai Records; Formats: LP, cassette; South Korea exclusive release	—		
1981	Sayonara Pink Lady: Released: December 5, 1981; Label: Victor Entertainment; Formats: LP, cassette	—		

=== Compilations ===
Year	Information	Oricon weekly peak position	Sales	RIAJ certification
1977	Best Hits Album: Released: December 5, 1977; Label: Victor Entertainment; Formats: LP	1	706,000 (Note: This includes sales of the 2003 CD release.)	
1977	Perfection: Released: December 5, 1977; Label: Victor Entertainment; Formats: cassette, 8-track	1	217,000	
1978	Hit Diary: Released: June 25, 1978; Label: Victor Entertainment; Formats: cassette, 8-track	2	159,000	
1978	Best Hits Album: Released: December 5, 1978; Label: Victor Entertainment; Formats: LP	3	159,000	
1978	Top Run: Released: December 5, 1978; Label: Victor Entertainment; Formats: cassette, 8-track	2	146,000	
1979	UFO/Southpaw: Released: June 1, 1979; Label: Victor Entertainment; Formats: LP	34	22,000	
1979	Spark Hits: Released: July 5, 1979; Label: Victor Entertainment; Formats: cassette, 8-track	22	40,000	
1979	Sound Gallery: Released: December 5, 1979; Label: Victor Entertainment; Formats: cassette, 8-track	69	7,000	
1980	Best One: Released: November 21, 1980; Label: Victor Entertainment; Formats: cassette	70	4,000	
1980	Turning Point: Released: December 5, 1980; Label: Victor Entertainment; Formats: LP, cassette	52		
1981	Pink Lady: Released: March 21, 1981; Label: Victor Entertainment; Formats: LP, cassette	25	13,000	
1990	Pink Lady History ~ Pink Lady Complete Singles Collection ~: Released: December 1, 1990; Label: Victor Entertainment; Formats: CD, cassette	—		
1993	Best One: Released: December 1, 1993; Label: Victor Entertainment; Formats: CD, cassette	—		
1995	Pink Lady Twin Best: Released: June 28, 1995; Label: Victor Entertainment; Formats: CD	—		
1996	Mie & Kei ~Pink Lady Best Selection~: Released: December 18, 1996; Label: Victor Entertainment; Formats: CD	—		
2006	Mega Hits!!: Released: February 22, 2006; Label: Victor Entertainment; Formats: CD	—		
2008	Yū Aku Works: Released: March 28, 2006; Label: Victor Entertainment; Formats: CD	—		
2009	Golden Best: Complete Single Collection: Released: December 16, 2009; Label: Victor Entertainment; Formats: CD	—		

=== Box sets ===
Year	Information	Oricon weekly peak position	Sales	RIAJ certification
2006	Pink Lady Platinum Box: Released: May 31, 2006; Label: Victor Entertainment; Formats: CD + DVD	73		
2006	Pink Lady Original Album Collection Box: Released: July 26, 2006; Label: Victor Entertainment; Formats: CD	—		
2011	Singles Premium: Released: August 25, 2011; Label: Victor Entertainment; Formats: CD + DVD	215		

=== Soundtracks ===
Year	Information	Oricon weekly peak position	Sales	RIAJ certification
1978	Pink Lady no Katsudō Daishashin: Released: December 25, 1978; Label: Victor Entertainment; Formats: LP, cassette	43	13,000	

=== Remix albums ===
Year	Information	Oricon weekly peak position	Sales	RIAJ certification
1987	Blood New: Released: December 1, 1987; Label: Victor Entertainment; Formats: CD, cassette	—		
1990	Remixes: Released: December 5, 1990; Label: Victor Entertainment; Formats: CD	—		
2006	Rare Trax: Released: January 21, 2006; Label: Victor Entertainment; Formats: CD	—		

=== Karaoke albums ===
Year	Information	Oricon weekly peak position	Sales	RIAJ certification
1977	Utatte Odoreru Karaoke Big Hit: Released: December 1977; Label: Victor Entertainment; Formats: LP, cassette	—		
1978	Karaoke Kettei-ban: Released: December 1978; Label: Victor Entertainment; Formats: LP, cassette	—		
2004	Pink Lady Original Karaoke Collection: Released: July 21, 2004; Label: Victor Entertainment; Formats: CD	—		

=== Tribute albums ===
Year	Information	Oricon weekly peak position	Sales	RIAJ certification
2009	Bad Friends: Released: December 16, 2009; Label: Pony Canyon; Formats: CD	—		
2026	Pink Lady Legend, Now and Forever: Released: August 26, 2026; Label: Victor Entertainment; Formats: CD, 2CD, digital	45		

== Singles ==
=== Japan singles ===
List of singles, with selected chart positions
Title	Date	Peak chart positions	Sales (JPN)	RIAJ certification	Album
Title	Date	Oricon Singles Charts	Sales (JPN)	RIAJ certification	Album
"Pepper Keibu"	August 25, 1976	4	1,050,000	Million	Pepper Keibu
"S.O.S."	November 25, 1976	1	1,200,000	3× Platinum	Pepper Keibu
"Carmen '77"	March 10, 1977	1	1,100,000	Million	Best Hits Album (1977)
"Nagisa no Sindbad"	June 10, 1977	1	1,450,000	3× Platinum	Best Hits Album (1977)
"Wanted (Shimei Tehai)"	September 5, 1977	1	1,650,000	4× Platinum	Best Hits Album (1977)
"UFO"	December 5, 1977	1	1,950,000	4× Platinum	Best Hits Album (1977)
"Southpaw"	March 25, 1978	1	1,800,000	4× Platinum	Best Hits Album (1978)
"Monster"	June 25, 1978	1	1,600,000	4× Platinum	Best Hits Album (1978)
"Tōmei Ningen"	September 9, 1978	1	1,150,000	Million	Best Hits Album (1978)
"Chameleon Army"	December 5, 1978	1	1,250,000	3× Platinum	Best Hits Album (1978)
"Zipangu"	March 9, 1979	4	1,000,000	Million	UFO/Southpaw
"Pink Typhoon (In the Navy)"	May 1, 1979	6	700,000	Platinum	UFO/Southpaw
"Nami Nori Pirates"	July 5, 1979	4	550,000	Platinum	Magical Music Tour
"Kiss in the Dark"	September 4, 1979	19	350,000	Gold	Pink Lady in the USA
"Monday Mona Lisa Club"	September 9, 1979	14	450,000	Platinum	Turning Point
"Do Your Best"	December 5, 1979	36	300,000	Gold	Pink Lady
"Ai Giri Giri"	March 5, 1980	58	200,000	Gold	Pink Lady
"Sekai Eiyushi"	May 21, 1980	45	150,000	N/A	Turning Point
"Utakata"	September 21, 1980	48	250,000	Gold	Turning Point
"Remember (Fame)"	December 5, 1980	86	150,000	N/A	Pink Lady
"Last Pretender"	January 21, 1981	85	100,000	N/A	Pink Lady
"OH!"	March 5, 1981	45	200,000	Gold	Pink Lady
"Fushigi Love"	June 21, 1984	—		N/A	Suspense ~Pink Lady Again~
"Pink Eyed Soul"	November 21, 1996	—		N/A	Mie & Kei ~Pink Lady Best Selection~
"Terebi ga Kita Hi"	May 5, 2003	183		N/A	Non-album single
"Meteor"	December 13, 2019	—		N/A	Non-album single
"—" denotes releases that did not chart.

=== U.S. singles ===
List of singles, with selected chart positions
Title	Date	Peak chart positions	Sales (USA)	RIAA certification	Album
Title	Date	Billboard Singles Charts	Sales (USA)	RIAA certification	Album
"Kiss in the Dark"	January 3, 1979	37		N/A	Pink Lady
"Dancing in the Halls of Love"	August 1979	—		N/A	Pink Lady
"—" denotes releases that did not chart.

== Videography ==
=== Music video albums ===
List of media, with selected chart positions
Title	Album details	Peak positions		Sales (Oricon)
Title	Album details	JPN DVD	JPN Blu-ray	Sales (Oricon)
All About Pink Lady ~From Star Tanjō to Sayonara Pink Lady~	Released: October 5, 1990; Label: VAP; Formats: LD, VHS	—	—	N/A
Now in Los Angeles	Released: March 21, 1991; Label: VAP; Formats: LD, VHS	—	—	N/A
Pink Eyed Soul	Released: January 1, 1997; Label: Victor Entertainment; Formats: VHS	—	—	N/A
Pink Lady... and Jeff	Released: June 26, 2001 (VHS) / October 9, 2001 (DVD); Label: Rhino Entertainment; Formats: VHS, DVD	—	—	N/A
Pink Lady Complete Choreography Master DVD Vol. 1	Released: July 9, 2004; Label: Kodansha; Formats: DVD	—	—	N/A
Pink Lady Complete Choreography Master DVD Vol. 2	Released: September 18, 2004; Label: Kodansha; Formats: DVD	—	—	N/A
Pink Lady in Yoru no Hit Studio ~ Fuji TV Hizō Eizō-shū	Released: May 27, 2011; Label: Pony Canyon; Formats: DVD	—	—	N/A

=== Live video albums ===
List of media, with selected chart positions
Title	Album details	Peak positions		Sales (Oricon)
Title	Album details	JPN DVD	JPN Blu-ray	Sales (Oricon)
Pink Lady Forever: Budokan Live	Released: 1984; Label: VAP; Formats: LD, VHS	—	—	N/A
Saikai Pink Lady	Released: September 19, 1997; Label: Victor Entertainment; Formats: LD, VHS	—	—	N/A
Memorial Concert Vol. 3: Pink Lady Last Tour Unforgettable Final Ovation	Released: August 25, 2005; Label: Video Pack Nippon/Tohokushinsha Video; Formats: DVD	—	—	N/A
Concert Tour 2011 "Innovation"	Released: December 28, 2011; Label: Victor Entertainment; Formats: DVD	—	—	N/A

=== Video box sets ===
List of media, with selected chart positions
Title	Album details	Peak positions		Sales (Oricon)
Title	Album details	JPN DVD	JPN Blu-ray	Sales (Oricon)
Pink Lady Chronicle TBS Special Edition	Released: April 19, 2023; Label: Victor Entertainment; Formats: 6-DVD	TBA	—	N/A

== See also ==
- List of best-selling music artists in Japan
