= Golden Best (Pink Lady album) =

Compilation album by Pink Lady
- Released: 16 September 2009
- Recorded: 1976–1981
- Genre: J-pop; kayōkyoku; disco; teen pop
- Language: Japanese
- Label: Victor

Pink Lady chronology
Yū Aku Works (2008)	Golden Best (2009)	INNOVATION (2010)

Golden Best ~ Complete Single Collection (ゴールデン☆ベスト ～コンプリート・シングル・コレクション, Gōruden Besuto ~ Konpurīto Singuru Korekushon) is a compilation album by Japanese duo Pink Lady, released by Victor Entertainment on September 16, 2009. The two-disc album features all of the duo's singles and B-sides from 1976 to 1981.

== Track listing ==
All lyrics are written by Yū Aku, except where indicated; all music is composed by Shunichi Tokura, except where indicated.

P: Disc 1
No.	Title	Lyrics	Music	Arrangement	Length
1.	"Pepper Keibu" (Peppā Keibu (ペッパー警部; "Inspector Pepper"))				3:16
2.	"Kanpai Ojōsan" ((乾杯お嬢さん; "Cheers, Miss"))				3:10
3.	"S.O.S."				2:42
4.	"Pink no Ringo" (Pinku no Ringo (ピンクの林檎; "Pink Apple"))				3:02
5.	"Carmen '77" (Karumen Nanajū-nana (カルメン '77))				3:36
6.	"Pipe no Kaijin" (Paipu no Kaijin (パイプの怪人; "Phantom of the Pipe"))				2:50
7.	"Nagisa no Sindbad" (Nagisa no Shindobaddo (渚のシンドバッド; "Sindbad of the Beach"))				2:34
8.	"Papaya Gundan" (Papaiya Gundan (パパイヤ軍団; "Papaya Legion"))				2:46
9.	"Wanted (Shimei Tehai)" (Uonteddo (Shimei Tehai) (ウォンテッド（指名手配）; "Wanted (Fugitive Warrant)"))				3:23
10.	"Nigero Ojōsan" ((逃げろお孃さん; "Run Away, Miss"))				2:39
11.	"UFO"				3:13
12.	"Lady X" (Redī Ekkusu (レディーＸ))				2:42
13.	"Southpaw" (Sausupō (サウスポー))				3:37
14.	"Accessory" (Akusesarī (アクセサリー))				2:38
15.	"Monster" (Monsutā (モンスター))				4:27
16.	"Catch Lip" (Kyatchi Rippu (キャッチ・リップ))				2:47
17.	"Tōmei Ningen" ((透明人間; "Invisible People"))				3:20
18.	"Super Monkey Son Goku" (Sūpā Monkī Son Gokū (スーパー・モンキー孫悟空))				2:54
19.	"Chameleon Army" (Kamereon Āmī (カメレオン・アーミー))				3:54
20.	"Dragon" (Doragon (ドラゴン))				4:30
21.	"Zipangu" (Jipangu (ジパング))				3:28
22.	"Jiken ga Okitara Bell ga Naru" (Jiken ga Okitara Beru ga Naru (事件が起きたらベルが鳴る; "A Bell Rings When an Incident Occurs"))				4:09
23.	"Pink Typhoon (In the Navy)" (Pinku Taifūn (In the Navy) (ピンク・タイフーン（In the Navy）))	Tomoko Okada	Jacques Morali; Henri Belolo; Victor Willis	Kazufumi Ōhama	4:09
24.	"Hello Mr. Monkey (Live)" (Harō Misutā Monkī (ハロー・ミスター・モンキー))	Ben Jurris; Benny Lux	Jurris; Lux	Norio Maeda	3:03

L: Disc 2
No.	Title	Lyrics	Music	Arrangement	Length
1.	"Nami Nori Pirates (Nihon Fukikomi-ban)" (Nami Nori Pairētsu (Nihon Fukikomi-ban) (波乗りパイレーツ (日本吹込盤); "Surfing Pirates" (Japan Blow Board)))				3:48
2.	"Nami Nori Pirates (U.S.A. Fukikomi-ban)" (Nami Nori Pairētsu (Yū Esu Ē Fukikomi-ban) (波乗りパイレーツ (U.S.A.吹込盤); "Surfing Pirates" (U.S.A. Blow Board)))			Paul Fauerso	4:34
3.	"Kiss in the Dark" (Kissu in za Dāku (キッス・イン・ザ・ダーク))	Michael Lloyd	Lloyd	John D'Andrea	2:57
4.	"Walk Away Renée" (Uōku Auei Rune (ウォーク・アウェイ・ルネ))	Michael Brown; Bob Calilli; Tony Sansone	Brown; Calilli; Sansone	Erich Buling	3:08
5.	"Monday Mona Lisa Club" (Mandē Mona Riza Kurabu (マンデー・モナリザ・クラブ))				3:50
6.	"Adam and Eve Super Love" (Adamu to Ibu Sūpā Rabu (アダムとイブ・スーパーラブ))				3:46
7.	"Do Your Best" (Du Yua Besuto (ドゥ・ユア・ベスト))	Shizuka Ijūin		Akira Inoue	4:10
8.	"Itoshi no New Orleans" (Itoshi no Nyū Orinzu (愛しのニューオリンズ; "Lovely New Orleans"))	Ijūin			3:46
9.	"Ai Giri Giri" ((愛・GIRI GIRI; "Last Minute Love"))	Ijūin	Yūichirō Oda	Ryō Kawakami	4:!2
10.	"Himitsu no Paradise" (Himitsu no Paradaisu (秘密のパラダイス; "Secret Paradise"))	Ijūin	Oda	Kawakami	3:25
11.	"Sekai Eiyushi" ((世界英雄史; "World History of Heroes"))	Akira Itō	Makoto Kawaguchi	Kawaguchi	4:13
12.	"The Chūshingura '80" (Za Chūsingura Eiti (ザ・忠臣蔵'80))	Itō	Kawaguchi	Kawaguchi	4:22
13.	"Utakata" ((うたかた; "Bubble"))	Noriko Miura	Lloyd	Kawaguchi	3:24
14.	"By Myself"	Miura	Kawaguchi	Kawaguchi	4:23
15.	"Remember (Fame)" (Rimenbā (Fēmu) (リメンバー (フェーム)))	Rei Nakanishi	Michael Gore; Dean Pitchford	Tatsushi Umegaki	4:13
16.	"Cattleya's Corsage" (Katorea no Kosāji (カトレアのコサージ))	Kimio Kudō	Umegaki	Umegaki	3:21
17.	"Last Pretender" (Rasuto Puritendā (ラスト・プリテンダー))	Shigesato Itoi	Itoi	Yukihiro Takahashi	3:36
18.	"AMENIC (Gyakukaiten no Cinema)" (Amenikku (Gyakukaiten no Shinema) (AMENIC（逆回転のシネマ）; "AMENIC (Counter-clockwise Cinema)"))	Itoi	Shigeru Umebayashi	EX	2:56
19.	"OH!"				4:59
20.	"Muchū ga Ichiban Utsukushī" ((夢中がいちばん美しい; "The Most Beautiful Crazy"))				4:21
