= Yū Aku Works =

Pink Lady: Yū Aku Works

Compilation album by Pink Lady
- Released: 26 March 2008
- Recorded: 1976–1981
- Genres: J-pop; kayōkyoku; disco; teen pop
- Language: Japanese
- Label: Victor

Pink Lady chronology
Pink Lady Platinum Box (2006)	Pink Lady: Yū Aku Works (2008)	Golden Best (2009)

Pink Lady: Yū Aku Works (ピンク・レディー 「阿久 悠 作品集」, Pink Redī: Aku Yū Sakuhin-shū) is a compilation album by Japanese duo Pink Lady, released on March 26, 2008. It was one of four Yū Aku Works compilation albums released by Victor Entertainment to honor songwriter Yū Aku, who died on August 1, 2007. The other three compilations were of Shinichi Mori, Hiromi Iwasaki, and Junko Sakurada.

The album was reissued on SACD+CD format on May 24, 2020.

== Track listing ==
All lyrics are written by Yū Aku; all music is composed by and arranged by Shunichi Tokura, except where indicated.

No.	Title	Music	Arrangement	Length
1.	"Pepper Keibu" (Peppā Keibu (ペッパー警部; "Inspector Pepper"))
2.	"S.O.S."
3.	"Carmen '77" (Karumen Nanajū-nana (カルメン '77))
4.	"Nagisa no Sindbad" (Nagisa no Shindobaddo (渚のシンドバッド; "Sindbad of the Beach"))
5.	"Wanted (Shimei Tehai)" (Uonteddo (Shimei Tehai) (ウォンテッド（指名手配）; "Wanted (Fugitive Warrant)"))
6.	"UFO"
7.	"Southpaw" (Sausupō (サウスポー))
8.	"Monster" (Monsutā (モンスター))
9.	"Tōmei Ningen" ((透明人間; "Invisible Person"))
10.	"Chameleon Army" (Kamereon Āmī (カメレオン・アーミー))
11.	"Zipangu" (Jipangu (ジパング))
12.	"Nami Nori Pirates" (Nami Nori Pairētsu (波乗りパイレーツ; "Surfing Pirates"))
13.	"Monday Mona Lisa Club" (Mandē Mona Riza Kurabu (マンデー・モナリザ・クラブ))
14.	"OH!"
15.	"Carmen Shower" (Karumen Shawā (カルメン・シャワー))	Kōji Makaino	Makaino
16.	"Ren'ai Inshōha" ((恋愛印象派; "Love Impressionist"))	Makaino	Makaino
