= UFO/Southpaw =

Greatest hits album by Pink Lady
- Released: 1 June 1979
- Genres: J-pop, disco, teen pop
- Label: Victor
- Producer: Hisahiko Iida

Pink Lady chronology
Live in Budoukan (1979)	UFO/Southpaw (1979)	Magical Music Tour (1979)

UFO/Southpaw (UFO／サウスポー, Yūfō/Sausupō) is a greatest hits album by Japanese duo Pink Lady, released on June 1, 1979. It features the duo's singles from "Pepper Keibu" to "Pink Typhoon (In the Navy)", as well as their accompanying B-side songs.

== Track listing ==
All lyrics are written by Yū Aku, except where indicated; all music is composed by and arranged by Shunichi Tokura, except where indicated.

Side A
No.	Title	Length
1.	"Pepper Keibu" (Peppā Keibu (ペッパー警部; "Inspector Pepper"))
2.	"Kanpai Ojōsan" ((乾杯お嬢さん; "Cheers, Miss"))
3.	"S.O.S."
4.	"Pink no Ringo" (Pinku no Ringo (ピンクの林檎; "Pink Apple"))
5.	"Carmen '77" (Karumen Nanajū-nana (カルメン '77))
6.	"Pipe no Kaijin" (Paipu no Kaijin (パイプの怪人; "Phantom of the Pipe"))

Side B
No.	Title	Length
1.	"Nagisa no Sindbad" (Nagisa no Shindobaddo (渚のシンドバッド; "Sindbad of the Beach"))
2.	"Papaya Gundan" (Papaiya Gundan (パパイヤ軍団; "Papaya Legion"))
3.	"Wanted (Shimei Tehai)" (Uonteddo (Shimei Tehai) (ウォンテッド（指名手配）; "Wanted (Fugitive Warrant)"))
4.	"Nigero Ojōsan" ((逃げろお孃さん; "Run Away, Miss"))
5.	"UFO"
6.	"Lady X" (Redī Ekkusu (レディーＸ))

Side C
No.	Title	Length
1.	"Southpaw" (Sausupō (サウスポー))
2.	"Accessory" (Akusesarī (アクセサリー))
3.	"Monster" (Monsutā (モンスター))
4.	"Catch Lip" (Kyatchi Rippu (キャッチ・リップ))
5.	"Tōmei Ningen" ((透明人間; "Invisible Person"))
6.	"Super Monkey Son Goku" (Sūpā Monkī Son Gokū (スーパー・モンキー孫悟空))

Side D
No.	Title	Lyrics	Music	Arrangement	Length
1.	"Chameleon Army" (Kamereon Āmī (カメレオン・アーミー))
2.	"Dragon" (Doragon (ドラゴン))
3.	"Zipangu" (Jipangu (ジパング))
4.	"Jiken ga Okitara Bell ga Naru" (Jiken ga Okitara Beru ga Naru (事件が起きたらベルが鳴る; "A Bell Rings When an Incident Occurs"))
5.	"Pink Typhoon (In the Navy)" (Pinku Taifūn (In the Navy) (ピンク・タイフーン（In the Navy）))	Tomoko Okada	Jacques Morali; Henri Belolo; Victor Willis	Kazufumi Ōhama
6.	"Hello Mr. Monkey" (Harō Misutā Monkī (ハロー・ミスター・モンキー))	Ben Jurris; Benny Lux	Jurris; Lux	Norio Maeda

== Charts ==
Chart (1979)	Peak position
Japanese Oricon Albums Chart	34

== See also ==
- Golden Best ~ Complete Single Collection - a newer compilation album with a similar track listing.
