= Pink Lady no Katsudō Daishashin =

1978 film

- Film poster
- Directed by: Tsugunobu Kotani
- Written by: James Miki
- Produced by: Kazuhiko Sōma; Junichi Tanaka
- Starring: Mitsuyo Nemoto; Keiko Masuda; Tetsuo Ishidate; Kunie Tanaka; Taisaku Akino; Ken Tanaka
- Cinematography: Yūzō Inagaki
- Edited by: Yoshitami Kuroiwa
- Music by: Shunichi Tokura
- Production companies: Toho; T&C Music
- Distributed by: Toho
- Release date: 16 December 1978 (Japan)
- Running time: 83 minutes
- Country: Japan
- Language: Japanese

Pink Lady no Katsudō Daishashin (Japanese: ピンク・レディーの活動大写真, Hepburn: Pinku Redī no Katsudō Daishashin; lit. Pink Lady's Big Motion Picture) is a 1978 Japanese anthology film directed by Tsugunobu Kotani and starring the J-pop duo Pink Lady.

== Plot ==
Mie and Kei, best known as the Japanese pop duo Pink Lady, are in New York City in the middle of their U.S. tour when they are asked by the press about their upcoming motion picture debut. Meanwhile, in Tokyo, film producer Senkichi Shirakawa, director Shinpei Akazawa, and screenwriter Hiroshi Aota discuss ideas on what kind of movie they should make for the duo. Aota wants a romantic melodrama, while Shirakawa suggests a science fiction film with monsters, and Akazawa pitches a Western film.

"Episode 1 - Humanity Story" (第１話 人情物語篇, Dai Ichi-wa Ninjō Monogatari-hen)

Nurse Kei is offered by her elderly patient Shizue Tanaka to marry her son Takayuki, who has a successful career in a prestigious company. At the same time, Kei's sister Mie is in a relationship with a bartender named Hattori, which Kei disapproves. The duo then arranges for a double date, but Kei is summoned at the last minute to tend to a head injury victim named Sugimoto, resulting in a fight between the two sisters after work. The next day, Kei goes to the bar to apologize to Hattori, only to discover that Takayuki and Hattori are the same person, as Takayuki confesses that he was forced to take up bartending after his company went bankrupt. To ensure that Mie stays happy with Takayuki, Kei has Sugimoto set up as her boyfriend. Kei offers Sugimoto money as a token of gratitude, but he refuses, telling her she will eventually find the right man.

"Episode 2 - Science Fiction Story" (第２話 ＳＦ篇, Dai Ni-wa Esu Efu-hen)

At a local circus, Mie and Kei are assigned to handle a large pink monster they nickname "Mon-chan". Feeling remorse for Mon-chan when the ringmaster and trainers physically abuse it, the duo frees it from its cage and run off with it to the forest. While being chased by the ringmaster, Mie, Kei, and Mon-chan end up near Mount Fuji, where they are beamed aboard a UFO. Mon-chan is reunited with its parents as the UFO heads back to their home planet, but Mie and Kei wish to return to Earth. The aliens attempt to beam the duo back to Earth, but a mishap causes them to turn invisible. Upon their return, Mie and Kei use their invisibility to fight crime in Tokyo.

"Episode 3 - Western Story" (第３話 西部劇篇, Dai San-wa Seibugeki-hen)

Mie and Kei are entertainers at a Texas saloon called "Western Town" when they are harassed by a gang of bandits led by Garlic. A lone hero named Sugar Brown intervenes and kills two of Garlic's henchmen during the shootout before he is wounded and forced to retreat. Because of this, Garlic has Sheriff Pepper place Sugar on the wanted list. Kei is in love with Sugar, but he tells her he must leave town to ensure the safety of her and Mie. The next night, while the duo performs at the saloon, the gang spots a disguised Sugar and prepares to kill him when Kei sacrifices herself to take a bullet for him. Sugar takes out two bandits, but a third one shoots him in the back. Sheriff Pepper arrives at the scene and with the help of Mie, kills Garlic in the shootout.

The next day, a grieving Mie sobs at the graves of Sugar and Kei. Sheriff Pepper attempts to console her, but she will not forgive him for not saving Kei. Suddenly, a UFO appears in the scene at the insistence of Shirakawa, forcing Akazawa to break character and attack Shirakawa and Aota.

Back in New York, Mie and Kei receive a phone call from Shirakawa, who asks them which of the three stories they want to do, unaware of the chaos in the production office from the in-fighting. The duo decides to do all three stories for their film before Kei drops the telephone receiver in the bathtub, spraying water in Shirakawa's face.

== Cast ==
- Mitsuyo Nemoto as Mie (ミー, Mī)
- Keiko Masuda as Kei (ケイ)
- Tetsuo Ishidate as Senkichi Shirakawa (白川仙吉, Shirakawa Senkichi)
- Kunie Tanaka as Shinpei Akazawa (赤沢信平, Akazawa Shinpei) and Sheriff Pepper (ペッパー保安官, Peppā Sherifu)
- Taisaku Akino as Hiroshi Aota (青田宏, Aota Hiroshi)
- Ken Tanaka as Takayuki Tanaka (田中高之, Tanaka Takayuki)
- Masumi Harukawa as Shizue Tanaka (田中静江, Tanaka Shizue)
- Osami Nabe as Sugimoto (杉本)
- Iwao Dan as Monster (モンスター, Monsutā)
- Bill Ross as the Circus Leader (サーカス団長, Sākasu Danchō)
- Gajirō Satō as Inokuma (猪熊)
- Kibaji Tankobo as Pierrot (ピエロ, Piero)
- Hachirō Misumi as the Safe-breaking Monster (金庫破りの怪漢, Kinko-yaburi no Kaikan)
- Masao Komatsu as the Drunkard (酔漢, Suikan)
- The Handers as the Delinquent Students (不良学生, Furyō Gakusei)
- Fujita Okamoto as Sugar Brown (シュガー・ブラウン, Shugā Buraun)
- Hiroshi Tanaka as Garlic (ガーリック, Gārikku)
- Toby Kadoguchi as Mustard (マスタード, Masutādo)
- Eitarō Matsuyama as a Reporter (記者, Kisha)
- Reiko Itsuki as Rumiko the Secretary (秘書・ルミ子, Hisho Rumiko)

== Soundtrack ==
Pink Lady no Katsudō Daishashin

Soundtrack album by Pink Lady
- Released: 25 December 1978
- Genres: J-pop; kayōkyoku; disco
- Label: Victor

Pink Lady chronology
Best Hits Album (1978)	Pink Lady no Katsudō Daishashin (1978)	Live in Budoukan (1979)

The soundtrack album was released on December 25, 1978, one week after the film's premiere. It features shortened versions of the duo's first 10 hit singles from 1976 to 1978. The 2006 CD release features dialogue tracks from the film.

=== Track listing ===
All lyrics are written by Yū Aku; all music is composed by Shunichi Tokura, except where indicated.

No.	Title	Music	Length
1.	"Opening" (Ōpuningu (オープニング))
2.	"Chameleon Army (Instrumental)" (Kamereon Āmī (Insutorumentaru) (カメレオン・アーミー（インストルメンタル）))
3.	"Southpaw" (Sausupō (サウスポー))
4.	"Drama #1" (Dorama Nanbā Wan (ドラマ#1) *)
5.	"S.O.S."
6.	"Carmen '77" (Karumen Nanajū-nana (カルメン '77))
7.	"Drama #2" (Dorama Nanbā Tsū (ドラマ#2) *)
8.	"Nagisa no Sindbad" (Nagisa no Shindobaddo (渚のシンドバッド; "Sindbad of the Beach"))
9.	"Drama #3" (Dorama Nanbā Surī (ドラマ#3) *)
10.	"Bridge #1" (Burijji Nanba Wan (ブリッジ#1) *)
11.	"Monster" (Monsutā (モンスター))
12.	"Drama #4" (Dorama Nanbā Fō (ドラマ#4) *)
13.	"Drama #5" (Dorama Nanbā Faibu (ドラマ#5) *)
14.	"UFO"
15.	"Bridge #2" (Burijji Nanbā Tsū (ブリッジ#2) *)
16.	"Tōmei Ningen" ((透明人間; "Invisible Person"))
17.	"Bridge #3" (Burijji Nanbā Surī (ブリッジ#3) *)
18.	"Chameleon Army" (Kamereon Āmī (カメレオン・アーミー))
19.	"Bridge #4" (Burijji Nanbā Fō (ブリッジ#4) *)
20.	"Pepper Keibu" (Peppā Keibu (ペッパー警部; "Inspector Pepper"))
21.	"Drama #6" (Dorama Nanbā Shikkusu (ドラマ#6) *)
22.	"Drama #7" (Dorama Nanbā Sebun (ドラマ#7) *)
23.	"Wanted (Shimei Tehai)" (Uonteddo (Shimei Tehai) (ウォンテッド（指名手配）; "Wanted (Fugitive Warrant)"))
24.	"Oh My Darling, Clementine" (Itoshi no Kurementain (いとしのクレメンタイン))	Percy Montrose
25.	"Chameleon Army (Ending)" (Kamereon Āmī (Endingu) (カメレオン・アーミー（エンディング）))

*CD bonus tracks

=== Charts ===
Chart (1978)	Peak position
Japanese Oricon Albums Chart	43

== Home media ==
The film was released on DVD on July 28, 2006 to commemorate the 30th anniversary of Pink Lady.
