= Best Hits Album =

Album by Pink Lady

Best Hits Album (ベスト・ヒット・アルバム, Besuto Hitto Arubamu) is the title of two different greatest hits albums by Japanese idol duo Pink Lady, released through Victor Entertainment in 1977 and 1978.

== 1977 version ==
Best Hits Album

Greatest hits album by Pink Lady
- Released: December 5, 1977; June 4, 2003 (CD)
- Recorded: 1976–1977; 1976–1981 (CD)
- Genres: J-pop; kayōkyoku; disco; teen pop
- Length: 43:16 LP & CD 1; 65:35 (CD 2)
- Languages: Japanese; English
- Label: Victor
- Producer: Hisahiko Iida

Pink Lady chronology
Summer Fire '77 (1977)	Best Hits Album (1977)	Bye Bye Carnival (1978)

Music videos
- Best Hits Album song digest on YouTube

Released on December 5, 1977, this album features the duo's singles from "Pepper Keibu" to "UFO", as well as their accompanying B-side songs. This version was reissued in a two-CD compilation on June 4, 2003, with the second disc featuring the duo's singles from "UFO" to "OH!".

The album became the duo's second No. 1 on Oricon's weekly albums chart. It sold over 702,000 copies, becoming the duo's biggest-selling album. The 2003 CD release peaked at No. 95 and sold an additional 4,000 copies.

=== Track listing ===
All lyrics are written by Yū Aku, except where indicated; all music is composed by and arranged by Shunichi Tokura, except where indicated.

CD Disc 1: Pink
No.	Title	Arrangement	Length
1.	"UFO" (Album Version)		3:13
2.	"Lady X" (Redī Ekkusu (レディーＸ))		2:41
3.	"Wanted (Shimei Tehai)" (Uonteddo (Shimei Tehai) (ウォンテッド（指名手配）; "Wanted (Fugitive Warrant)"))		3:23
4.	"Nigero Ojōsan" ((逃げろお孃さん; "Run Away, Miss"))		2:39
5.	"Nagisa no Sindbad" (Nagisa no Shindobaddo (渚のシンドバッド; "Sindbad of the Beach"))		2:34
6.	"Papaya Gundan" (Papaiya Gundan (パパイヤ軍団; "Papaya Legion"))		2:45
7.	"Yūutsubi" ((ゆううつ日; "Day of Depression"))	Katsunori Ishida	3:30
8.	"Carmen '77" (Karumen Nanajū-nana (カルメン '77))		3:36
9.	"Pipe no Kaijin" (Paipu no Kaijin (パイプの怪人; "Phantom of the Pipe"))		2:50
10.	"S.O.S."		2:42
11.	"Pink no Ringo" (Pinku no Ringo (ピンクの林檎; "Pink Apple"))		3:02
12.	"Pepper Keibu" (Peppā Keibu (ペッパー警部; "Inspector Pepper"))		3:16
13.	"Kanpai Ojōsan" ((乾杯お嬢さん; "Cheers, Miss"))		3:10
14.	"Inspiration" (Insupirēshon (インスピレーション))	Ishida	3:49
Total length:			43:16

CD Disc 2: Lady
No.	Title	Lyrics	Music	Arrangement	Length
1.	"UFO" (Single Version)				3:13
2.	"Southpaw" (Sausupō (サウスポー))				3:36
3.	"Monster" (Monsutā (モンスター))				4:27
4.	"Tōmei Ningen" ((透明人間; "Invisible Person"))				3:19
5.	"Chameleon Army" (Kamereon Āmī (カメレオン・アーミー))				3:51
6.	"Zipangu" (Jipangu (ジパング))				3:28
7.	"Pink Typhoon (In the Navy)" (Pinku Taifūn (In za Nebī) (ピンク・タイフーン（In the Navy）))	Tomoko Okada	Jacques Morali; Henri Belolo; Victor Willis	Kazufumi Ōhama	4:09
8.	"Nami Nori Pirates" (Nami Nori Pairētsu (波乗りパイレーツ; "Surfing Pirates"))				3:47
9.	"Kiss in the Dark"	Michael Lloyd	Lloyd	John D'Andrea	2:58
10.	"Monday Mona Lisa Club" (Mandē Mona Riza Kurabu (マンデー・モナリザ・クラブ))				3:50
11.	"Do Your Best"	Shizuka Ijūin		Akira Inoue	4:09
12.	"Ai Giri Giri" ((愛・GIRI GIRI; "Last Minute Love"))	Ijūin	Yūichirō Oda	Ryō Kawakami	4:13
13.	"Sekai Eiyushi" ((世界英雄史; "World History of Heroes"))	Akira Itō	Makoto Kawaguchi	Kawaguchi	4:13
14.	"Utakata" ((うたかた; "Bubble"))	Yoshiko Miura	Lloyd	Kawaguchi	3:25
15.	"Remember (Fame)" (Rimenbā (Fēmu) (リメンバー (フェーム)))	Rei Nakanishi	Michael Gore; Dean Pitchford	Tatsushi Umegaki	4:24
16.	"Last Pretender" (Rasuto Puritendā (ラスト・プリテンダー))	Shigesato Itoi	Itoi	Yukihiro Takahashi	3:37
17.	"OH!"				4:58
Total length:					65:35

=== Charts ===
Chart (1977)	Peak position
Japanese Oricon Albums Chart	1

Chart (2003)	Peak position
Japanese Oricon Albums Chart	95

== 1978 version ==
Best Hits Album

Greatest hits album by Pink Lady
- Released: December 5, 1978
- Recorded: 1976–1978
- Genres: J-pop; kayōkyoku; disco; teen pop
- Language: Japanese
- Label: Victor
- Producer: Hisahiko Iida

Pink Lady chronology
Hoshi kara Kita Futari (1978)	Best Hits Album (1978)	Pink Lady no Katsudō Daishashin (1978)

The second version of the compilation album was released on December 5, 1978, focusing mainly on the duo's singles up to "Chameleon Army", as well as four later B-side songs.

The album peaked at No. 3 on Oricon's weekly albums chart and sold over 159,000 copies.

=== Track listing ===
All lyrics are written by Yū Aku; all music is composed by and arranged by Shunichi Tokura.

Side A
No.	Title	Length
1.	"Chameleon Army" (Kamereon Āmī (カメレオン・アーミー))
2.	"Southpaw" (Sausupō (サウスポー))
3.	"S.O.S."
4.	"Nagisa no Sindbad" (Nagisa no Shindobaddo (渚のシンドバッド; "Sindbad of the Beach"))
5.	"Wanted (Shimei Tehai)" (Uonteddo (Shimei Tehai) (ウォンテッド（指名手配）; "Wanted (Fugitive Warrant)"))
6.	"UFO"
7.	"Pepper Keibu" (Peppā Keibu (ペッパー警部; "Inspector Pepper"))

Side B
No.	Title	Length
1.	"Tōmei Ningen" ((透明人間; "Invisible Person"))
2.	"Monster" (Monsutā (モンスター))
3.	"Carmen '77" (Karumen Nanajū-nana (カルメン '77))
4.	"Super Monkey Son Goku" (Sūpā Monkī Son Gokū (スーパー・モンキー孫悟空))
5.	"Dragon" (Doragon (ドラゴン))
6.	"Accessory" (Akusesarī (アクセサリー))
7.	"Catch Lip" (Kyatchi Rippu (キャッチ・リップ))

=== Charts ===
Chart (1978)	Peak position
Japanese Oricon Albums Chart	3
