= Bye Bye Carnival =

Live album by Pink Lady
- Released: March 5, 1978
- Recorded: December 27, 1977
- Venue: Nippon Budokan
- Genre: J-pop; kayōkyoku; disco; teen pop
- Length: 75:04
- Language: Japanese; English
- Label: Victor
- Producer: Hisahiko Iida

Pink Lady chronology
Best Hits Album (1977)	Bye Bye Carnival (1978)	America! America! America! (1978)

Bye Bye Carnival (バイ・バイ・カーニバル, Bai Bai Kānibaru) is the third live album by Japanese idol duo Pink Lady. Recorded live during their Christmas concert at the Nippon Budokan on December 27, 1977, the album was released on March 5, 1978.

The album peaked at No. 5 on Oricon's weekly albums chart and sold over 94,000 copies.

== Track listing ==
CD
No.	Title	Writer(s)	Length
1.	"Opening ~A Rock'n Roll Girl from Alaska~ (オープニング ～アラスカ・ロックの風が吹く, Ōpuningu ~ Arasuka Rokku no Kaze ga Fuku; "Opening ~ The Alaska Rock Wind Blows")"	Peter Shuey; Mick Stewart	6:28
2.	"Medley I (メドレー I, Medorē Wan): "She'd Rather Be With Me" (あの娘はアイドル, Ano Musume wa Aidoru; "The Girl Is an Idol"); "We Made It Last Summertime" (思い出のサマータイム, Omoide wa Samātaimu); "Morning Girl" (素敵なモーニング・ガール, Suteki na Mōningu Gāru); "Da Doo Ron Ron" (ダ・ドゥ・ロン・ロン, Da Du Ron Ron)"	Alan Gordon; Ellie Greenwich; Frederick Tupper Saussy; Garry Bonner; Jeff Barry; Junior Campbell; Miki Antony; Phil Spector	7:15
3.	"Kanpai Ojōsan (乾杯お嬢さん; "Cheers, Miss")"	Yū Aku; Shunichi Tokura	3:06
4.	"Medley II (メドレー I, Medorē Tsū): "Sunny" (サニー, Sanī); "Save the Last Dance for Me" (ラスト・ダンスは私に, Rasuto Dansu wa Watashi ni)"	Bobby Hebb; Doc Pomus; Mort Shuman	4:24
5.	"Super Monkey (スーパー・モンキー, Sūpā Monkī)"	Aku; Tokura	1:22
6.	"Pepper Keibu (ペッパー警部, Peppā Keibu; "Inspector Pepper")"	Aku; Tokura	2:56
7.	"S.O.S."	Aku; Tokura	3:19
8.	"It's So Easy! (イッツ・ソー・イージー, Ittsu sō Ījī)"	Buddy Holly; Norman Petty	2:15
9.	"Linda Bella Linda (リンダ・ベラ・リンダ, Rinda Bera Rinda)"	Francesco Specchia; Querencio; Sentacruz; Zacar	3:45
10.	"Gentle on My Mind (ジェントル・オン・マイ・マインド, Jentoru on Mai Maindo)"	John Hartford	2:57
11.	"Lovesick Blues (ラブシック・ブルース, Rabushikku Burūzu)"	Irving Mills; Cliff Friend	2:23
12.	"Silly Love Songs (シェリー・ラブ・ソング, Shirī Rabu Songu)"	Paul McCartney; Linda McCartney	4:12
13.	"Yesterday When I Was Young (帰り来ぬ青春, Kaeri konu Seishun)"	Charles Aznavour; Georges Garvarentz	3:45
14.	"Rock and Roll Medley (ロックン・ロール・メドレー, Rokkun Rōru Medorē): "Diana" (ダイアナ, Daiana); "Rhythm of the Rain" (悲しき雨音, Kanashiki Amaoto); "Circulate" (悲しき慕情, Kanashiki Bojō); "Itsy Bitsy Teenie Weenie Yellow Polkadot Bikini" (ビキニ・スタイルのお嬢さん, Bikini Sutairu no Ojōsan); "Multiplication" (マルチプリケーション, Maruchipurikēshon); "Let's Twist Again" (レッツ・ツイスト・アゲイン, Rettsu Tsuisuti Agein); "The Loco-Motion" (ロコモーション, Rokomōshon); "Speedy Gonzales" (スピーディー・ゴンザレス, Supīdī Gonzaresu); "Twist and Shout" (ツイスト＆シャウト, Tsuisuto and Shauto); "Rock and Roll Music" (ロックン・ロール・ミュージック, Rokkun Rōru Myūjikku)"	Paul Anka; John Claude Gummoe; Neil Sedaka; Howard Greenfield; Paul Vance; Lee Pockriss; Bobby Darin; Kal Mann; Dave Appell; Carole King; Buddy Kaye; Ethel Lee; David Hess; Phil Medley; Bert Berns; Chuck Berry	5:36
15.	"UFO"	Aku; Tokura	3:16
16.	"Carmen '77 (カルメン '77, Karumen Nanajū-nana)"	Aku; Tokura	2:21
17.	"Nagisa no Sindbad (渚のシンドバッド, Nagisa no Shindobaddo; "Sindbad of the Beach")"	Aku; Tokura	2:31
18.	"Wanted (Shimei Tehai) (ウォンテッド（指名手配）, Uonteddo (Shimei Tehai); "Wanted (Fugitive Warrant)")"	Aku; Tokura	3:31
19.	"I Love How You Love Me (忘れたいのに, Wasuretai no Ni)"	Barry Mann; Larry Kolber	1:59
20.	"I Believe (アイ・ビリーブ, Ai Birību)"	Ervin Drake; Irvin Graham; Jimmy Shirl; Al Stillman	2:34
21.	"Hotaru no Hikari ~ Ending (蛍の光～エンディング, Hotaru no Hikari ~ Endingu; "Glow of a Firefly ~ Ending")"	Traditional; Chiaki Inagaki	5:06
Total length:			75:04

== Charts ==
Chart (1978)	Peak position
Japan Oricon Albums Chart	5

== See also ==
- 1978 in Japanese music
