= List of Oricon number-one singles of 1978 =

The highest-selling singles in Japan are ranked in the Oricon Singles Chart, which is published by Oricon Style magazine. The data are compiled by Oricon based on each singles' physical sales. This list includes the singles that reached the number one place on that chart in 1978.

== Oricon Weekly Singles Chart ==
Issue date	Song	Artist(s)	Ref.
January 2	"UFO"	Pink Lady	
January 9	"UFO"	Pink Lady	
January 16	"UFO"	Pink Lady	
January 23	"UFO"	Pink Lady	
January 30	"UFO"	Pink Lady	
February 6	"UFO"	Pink Lady	
February 13	"UFO"	Pink Lady	
February 20	"UFO"	Pink Lady	
February 27	"Canada Kara no Tegami"	Masaaki Hirao & Yōko Hatanaka	
March 6	"Canada Kara no Tegami"	Masaaki Hirao & Yōko Hatanaka	
March 13	"Hohoemi Gaeshi"	Candies	
March 20	"Hohoemi Gaeshi"	Candies	
March 27	"Hohoemi Gaeshi"	Candies	
April 3	"Southpaw"	Pink Lady	
April 10	"Southpaw"	Pink Lady	
April 17	"Southpaw"	Pink Lady	
April 24	"Southpaw"	Pink Lady	
May 1	"Southpaw"	Pink Lady	
May 8	"Southpaw"	Pink Lady	
May 15	"Southpaw"	Pink Lady	
May 22	"Southpaw"	Pink Lady	
May 29	"Southpaw"	Pink Lady	
June 5	"Darling"	Kenji Sawada	
June 12	"Jikan yo Tomare"	Eikichi Yazawa	
June 19	"Jikan yo Tomare"	Eikichi Yazawa	
June 26	"Jikan yo Tomare"	Eikichi Yazawa	
July 3	"Mr. Summertime"	Circus	
July 10	"Monster"	Pink Lady	
July 17	"Monster"	Pink Lady	
July 24	"Monster"	Pink Lady	
July 31	"Monster"	Pink Lady	
August 7	"Monster"	Pink Lady	
August 14	"Monster"	Pink Lady	
August 21	"Monster"	Pink Lady	
August 28	"Monster"	Pink Lady	
September 4	"Hikigane"	Masanori Sera & Twist	
September 11	"Kimi no Hitomi wa 10,000 Volt"	Takao Horiuchi	
September 18	"Kimi no Hitomi wa 10,000 Volt"	Takao Horiuchi	
September 25	"Kimi no Hitomi wa 10,000 Volt"	Takao Horiuchi	
October 2	"Tomei Ningen"	Pink Lady	
October 9	"Kimi no Hitomi wa 10,000 Volt"	Takao Horiuchi	
October 16	"Tomei Ningen"	Pink Lady	
October 23	"Tomei Ningen"	Pink Lady	
October 30	"Tomei Ningen"	Pink Lady	
November 6	"Kisetsu no Naka de"	Chiharu Matsuyama	
November 13	"Kisetsu no Naka de"	Chiharu Matsuyama	
November 20	"Kisetsu no Naka de"	Chiharu Matsuyama	
November 27	"Kisetsu no Naka de"	Chiharu Matsuyama	
December 4	"Kisetsu no Naka de"	Chiharu Matsuyama	
December 11	"Kisetsu no Naka de"	Chiharu Matsuyama	
December 18	"Chameleon Army"	Pink Lady	
December 25	"Chameleon Army"	Pink Lady	

== See also ==
- 1978 in Japanese music
