= Hoshi kara Kita Futari =

Studio album by Pink Lady
- Released: November 5, 1978
- Recorded: 1978
- Genres: J-pop; kayōkyoku; disco; teen pop
- Length: 30:31
- Label: Victor
- Producer: Hisahiko Iida

Pink Lady chronology
'78 Jumping Summer Carnival (1978)	Hoshi kara Kita Futari (1978)	Best Hits Album (1978)

Hoshi kara Kita Futari (星から来た二人; lit. Two People from the Stars) is the second studio album Japanese idol duo Pink Lady, released through Victor Entertainment on November 5, 1978. The title track and "Friends" are Pink Lady's versions of the opening and ending themes of the anime Pink Lady Monogatari: Eikō no Tenshi-tachi (ピンク・レディー物語 栄光の天使たち; The Story of Pink Lady: Angels of Splendid Fame), which were originally recorded by Young Fresh. The album also includes a medley of commercial jingles of products endorsed by the duo.

The album peaked at No. 10 on Oricon's weekly albums chart and sold over 46,000 copies.

== Track listing ==
All lyrics are written by Yū Aku; all music is composed by Shunichi Tokura.

Side A
No.	Title	Length
1.	"Hyappatsu Hyakuchū (Note: Theme song for the NTV variety show NTV's The Hit! Pink Hyappatsu Hyakuchū (NTVザ・ヒット! ピンク百発百中!; NTV's The Hit! Pink Bullseye)))" ((百発百中; "Bullseye"))	3:48
2.	"Sen no Kao wo Motsu Onna (Note: Theme song for the Tokyo 12 Channel variety show Hello! Pink Lady (ハロー! ピンクレディー, Harō! Pinku Redī))" ((千の顔を持つ女; "Woman with a Thousand Faces"))	2:52
3.	"Mystery Tour (Note: Theme song for the TV Asahi variety show Hashire! Pink Lady (走れ!ピンクレディー, Hashire! Pinku Redī; Run! Pink Lady))" (Misuterī Tsuā (ミステリー・ツアー))	2:45
4.	"Friends" (Furenzu (フレンズ))	2:44
5.	"Hoshi kara Kita Futari" ((星から来た二人; "Two People from the Stars"))	2:49

Side B
No.	Title	Length
1.	"2001-nen Ai no Shi (Note: Theme song for the NTV series Ai wa Chikyū wo Sukū (愛は地球を救う; Love Saves the Earth))" (Nisen Ichi-nen Ai no Shi (2001年愛の詩; "2001 Love Poem"))	3:27
2.	"Commercial Song Medley (コマーシャルソングメドレー, Komāsharu Songu Medorē): "Showerun Glittering Summer" (シャワランきらめきの夏, Shawaran Kirameki no Natsu) (Cow Brand Showerun shampoo); "Kinchō Electric Mosquito Mat" (金鳥電子蚊とりマット, Kinchō Denshi Katori Matto); "Catch Lip" (キャッチ・リップ, Kyatchi Rippu) (Snow Brand Hōseki-bako ice cream); "Showerun First Spring" (シャワランはじめての春, Shawaran Hajimete no Naru); "Nissin Yakisoba U.F.O." (日清焼きそばUFO, Nisshin Yakisoba Yūfō); "Asahi Toys Fashionable Dolls" (アサヒ玩具おしゃれ人形, Asahi Omocha Oshare Ningyō); "Shinsyu-ichi Instant Miso Soup" (神州一即席味噌汁, Shinshūichi Sokuseki Misoshiru) (Incorporates "Southpaw"); "Caron Underwear ~ Catch Lip of Love" (キャロン肌着～恋のキャッチリップ, Kyaron Hadagi ~ Koi no Kyatchi Rippu) (Katakura Industries); "Gakken Junior Course" (学研中一コース, Gakken Chūichi Kōsu); "Nissin Ramen Menkurabe" (日清ラーメンめんくらべ, Nisshin Rāmen Menkurabe); "Showerun in the Wind" (風の中にシャワラン, Fū no Naka ni Shawaran); "National Pepper" (ナショナルペッパー, Nashonaru Peppā) (National Pepper portable radio); "Winny Show" (ウィニーSHOW, Uinī Shō) (Nippon Ham Winny sausages); "Gakken New Course" (学研ニューコース, Gakken Nyū Kōsu); "It's Cool" (それゆけクール, Sore Yuke Kūru) (National air conditioner); "Sign Is Red" (サインはレッド, Sain wa Reddo) (National Pepper portable radio); "Showerun Glittering Summer" (reprise)"	9:14
3.	"Super Monkey Son Goku" (Sūpā Monkī Son Gokū (スーパーモンキー孫悟空) (Note: Theme song for the TBS puppet series Tobe! Son Gokū (飛べ!孫悟空; Fly! Son Goku)))	2:51

== Charts ==
Chart (1978)	Peak position
Japanese Oricon Albums Chart	10

== See also ==
- 1978 in Japanese music
