= Innovation (album) =

INNOVATION

Studio album by Pink Lady
- Released: 1 December 2010
- Genres: J-pop; kayōkyoku; disco
- Language: Japanese
- Label: Victor

Pink Lady chronology
Golden Best (2009)	INNOVATION (2010)	Pink Lady Singles Premium (2011)

INNOVATION (イノベーション, Inobēshon) was released on December 1, 2010, as the comeback album of Japanese duo Pink Lady. Released as a 2-CD set, the album features re-recorded versions of single releases, b-sides and well known songs.

== Track listing ==
All lyrics are written by Yū Aku, except where indicated; all music is composed by and arranged by Shunichi Tokura, except where indicated.

Disc 1
No.	Title	Lyrics	Music	Arrangement	Length
1.	"Kiss in the Dark"	Michael Lloyd	Lloyd	John D'Andrea	3:20
2.	""Kanpai Ojōsan" (乾杯お嬢さん; "Cheers, Miss")"				3:08
3.	"Monster (モンスター, Monsutā)"				4:24
4.	"Nagisa no Sindbad (渚のシンドバッド, Nagisa no Shindobaddo; "Sindbad of the Beach")"				2:33
5.	"By Myself"	Yoshiko Miura	Makoto Kawaguchi	Kawaguchi	4:37
6.	"Koi wa Kakehiki (恋はかけひき; "Love Is Over")"	Keiko Nakamoto; Akira Itō	Kawaguchi	Kawaguchi	4:50
7.	"S.O.S."				2:42
8.	"Wanted (Shimei Tehai) (ウォンテッド（指名手配）, Uonteddo (Shimei Tehai); "Wanted (Fugitive Warrant)")"				3:22
9.	"Milano Rose (ミラノ・ローズ, Mirano Rōzu)"	Yoshiko Miura	Kawaguchi	Kawaguchi	4:20
10.	"Pepper Keibu (ペッパー警部, Peppā Keibu; "Inspector Pepper")"				3:15
11.	"Jiken ga Okitara Bell ga Naru (事件が起きたらベルが鳴る, Jiken ga Okitara Beru ga Naru; "A Bell Rings When an Incident Occurs")"				3:56
12.	"Carmen '77 (カルメン '77, Karumen Nanajū-nana)"				3:36
13.	"Kibō e no Senritsu (希望への旋律; "A Melody to Hope")"	Kazu Katagiri	Kawaguchi	Kawaguchi	4:50
14.	"Southpaw (サウスポー, Sausupō)"				3:33
15.	"Tōmei Ningen (透明人間; "Invisible Person")"				3:17
16.	"Body & Soul"	Chinfa Kan	Yūsuke Hoguchi	Masaki Matsubara	4:40
17.	"Chameleon Army (カメレオン・アーミー, Kamereon Āmī)"				3:52
18.	"OH!"				5:00
19.	"Do Your Best"	Shizuka Ijūin			4:05
20.	"Zipangu (ジパング, Jipangu)"				3:26
Total length:					73:58

Disc 2
No.	Title	Lyrics	Music	Arrangement	Length
1.	"Monday Mona Lisa Club (マンデー・モナリザ・クラブ, Mandē Mona Riza Kurabu)" (2mix Stereo Master)				3:46
2.	"Hoshi kara Kita Futari (星から来た二人; "Two People from the Stars")" (2mix Stereo Master)				2:44
3.	"UFO" (2mix Stereo Master)				3:13
4.	"Remember (Fame) (リメンバー (フェーム), Rimenbā (Fēmu))" (Cover Song)	Rei Nakanishi	Michael Gore; Dean Pitchford	Tatsushi Umegaki	4:12
5.	"Pink Typhoon (In the Navy) (ピンク・タイフーン（In the Navy）, Pinku Taifūn (In za Nebī))" (Cover Song)	Tomoko Okada	Jacques Morali; Henri Belolo; Victor Willis	Kazufumi Ōhama	4:12
Total length:					17:27

== Charts ==
Chart (2011)	Peak position
Japan Oricon Albums Chart	89
Japan Top Albums Sales (Billboard)	77
