= Bad Friends =

Compilation album by various artists
- Released: 16 December 2009
- Genre: J-pop
- Label: Pony Canyon
- Producer: Ichinen Yamazaki

Various artists chronology
| Bad Friends (2009) | Pink Lady Legend, Now and Forever (2026) |

Limited Edition cover

Bad Friends (バッド・フレンズ, Baddo Furenzu) is a 2009 tribute album, featuring a variety of artists covering songs written by Yū Aku for the Japanese duo Pink Lady. It was released on December 16, 2009. The album's name comes from Akuyū (悪友), which translates to "Bad friend" and is the origin of Yū Aku's name.

The final track, "Kawahara no Ishikawa Goemon" was originally recorded by Eiichi Ohtaki (under the pseudonym "Niagara Fallin' Stars") on his 1978 album Let's Ondo Again. This version is performed by Kanzashi (簪; lit. "Hairpin"), which consists of then-AKB48 members Mayu Watanabe, Haruka Nakagawa, Aika Ota, and Natsumi Hirajima, plus Pink Lady member Mie. The song incorporates the melodies of the Pink Lady songs "Nagisa no Sindbad", "S.O.S.", "Wanted", "Carmen '77", "Pepper Keibu", and "UFO".

== Track listing ==
CD

All lyrics are written by Yū Aku; all music is composed by Shunichi Tokura.

| No. | Title | Artist | Length |
|---|---|---|---|
| 1. | "UFO" | Anna Tsuchiya & Mari Natsuki |
| 2. | "Nagisa no Sindbad" (Nagisa no Shindobaddo (渚のシンドバッド; "Sindbad of the Beach")) | Watarirouka Hashiritai |
| 3. | "Southpaw" (Sausupō (サウスポー)) | Checkicco |
| 4. | "Monster" (Monsutā (モンスター)) | Yu Takahashi & Nana Yanagisawa |
| 5. | "Pepper Keibu" (Peppā Keibu (ペッパー警部; "Inspector Pepper")) | Atsuko Kurusu & Tomomi Miyauchi |
| 6. | "Wanted (Shimei Tehai)" (Uonteddo (Shimei Tehai) (ウォンテッド（指名手配）; "Wanted (Fugitive Warrant)")) | Miz & Shiho (Fried Pride) |
| 7. | "Zipangu" (Jipangu (ジパング)) | Sue Cream Sue (Kome Kome Club) |
| 8. | "Chameleon Army" (Kamereon Āmī (カメレオン・アーミー)) | Amii Ozaki & Ami Onuki (Puffy AmiYumi) |
| 9. | "S.O.S." | Chiemi Hori & Tooru Yamazaki |
| 10. | "Carmen '77" (Karumen Nanajū-nana (カルメン '77)) | Ruriko Kubō & Kyōko (ex-Barbee Boys) |
| 11. | "Tōmei Ningen" ((透明人間; "Invisible Person")) | ManaKana |
| 12. | "Kawahara no Ishikawa Goemon" ((河原の石川五右衛門; "Ishikawa Goemon in the River")) | Kanzashi (簪) |

DVD (Limited Edition)

- "Kawahara no Ishikawa Goemon" (Music Video)

- Includes "making of" clips.
