= Cover You =

Studio album by Morning Musume
- Released: November 26, 2008
- Genres: J-pop; disco; jazz; rock and roll; dance-pop
- Label: Zetima
- Producer: Tsunku

Morning Musume chronology
Morning Musume All Singles Complete: 10th Anniversary (2007)	Cover You (2008)	Platinum 9 Disc (2009)

First Press Cover

Singles from Cover You
- 1. "Pepper Keibu" Released: September 24, 2008

Cover You is the first cover and tribute album by the J-pop idol group Morning Musume, released on November 26, 2008. The album features songs by Yū Aku for the duo Pink Lady and other musicians. The first-press edition comes in a three-spined case with an alternate cover.

== Track listing ==
All lyrics are written by Yū Aku.

No.	Title	Music	Original artist(s)	Length
1.	"Nagisa no Sindbad" (渚のシンドバッド; "Sindbad of the Beach")	Shunichi Tokura	Pink Lady	2:37
2.	"Dō ni mo Tomaranai" (どうにもとまらない; "I Can't Stop")	Tokura	Linda Yamamoto	2:53
3.	"Izakaya" (居酒屋)	Katsuo Ōno	Hiroshi Itsuki and Nana Kinomi	3:52
4.	"Pepper Keibu (Album Version)" (ペッパー警部; "Inspector Pepper")	Tokura	Pink Lady	4:26
5.	"Shiroi Chō no Samba" (白い蝶のサンバ; "White Butterfly Samba")	Katsuo Inoue	Kayoko Moriyama	3:28
6.	"Seishun Jidai" (青春時代; "Youth Era")	Koichi Morita	Koichi Morita & Top Galant	3:05
7.	"Ringo Satsujin Jiken" (林檎殺人事件; "The Apple Murder Case")	Yūsuke Hoguchi	Hiromi Go and Kirin Kiki	4:25
8.	"Romance (Album Version)" (ロマンス)	Kyōhei Tsutsumi	Hiromi Iwasaki	3:41
9.	"Machi no Akari" (街の灯り; "City Lights")	Keisuke Hama	Masaaki Sakai	3:37
10.	"Koi no Dial 6700" (恋のダイヤル6700; "Love Dial 6700")	Daisuke Inoue	Finger 5	3:04
11.	"Pin Pon Pan Taisō" (ピンポンパン体操; "Ping Pong Gymnastics")	Asei Kobayashi	Suginami Junior Chorus	4:18
12.	"Watashi no Aoi Tori" (わたしの青い鳥; "My Bluebird")	Yasushi Nakamura	Junko Sakurada	3:18
13.	"Johnny e no Dengon" (ジョニィへの伝言; "A Message to Johnny")	Tokura	Pedro & Capricious	3:57
14.	"UFO"	Tokura	Pink Lady	3:08

== Oricon ranks and sales ==
Chart	Position	Sales
Daily	12	12,037
Weekly	27	12,037
