= Alice SOS =

Television anime

アリスSOS (Arisu SOS)
- Genre: Adventure
- Created by: Ryo Nakahara
- Anime television series
- Directed by: Shingo Kaneko
- Written by: Osamu Nakamura
- Music by: Kenichi Kamio
- Studio: J.C.Staff
- Original network: NHK Educational TV
- Original run: 6 April 1998 – 28 January 1999
- Episodes: 14

Alice SOS (アリスSOS, Arisu SOS) is a Japanese anime television series animated by J.C.Staff. It was broadcast every second week on NHK from April 6, 1998, until January 28, 1999.

== Story ==
Takashi loves reading books and especially loves Alice's Adventures in Wonderland. One day, he buys some used books, and he finds one book thrown in. When Takashi opens the book, the God of Math, M-1 appeared. Takashi is told that Alice is kidnapped, and he is asked to rescue her by M-1. Takashi goes on an adventure in Wonderland to rescue Alice.

== Characters ==
Takashi Sagano (嵯峨野タカシ, Sagano Takashi)
Voiced by: Motoko Kumai
Takashi is a junior high school student and a big fan of Alice in Wonderland. He is asked to rescue Alice by M-1 and goes on an adventure to do this. His ability is average, but his brave heart is great.
Hiromi Sugita (杉田ひろみ, Sugita Hiromi)
Voiced by: Ayako Shiraishi
Hiromi is a neighbor and classmate of Takashi. She heard that Takashi is going on an adventure and decides to follow him. She is rowdy. But she is worried about Takashi, because he often does dangerous things.
Toshio Kazumi (和美トシオ, Kazumi Toshio)
Voiced by: Kyousei Tsukui
Toshio is a friend of Takashi. He loves girls. To start the adventure, an adventurer must solve a problem in Math, so Takashi asks to help him. But his ability is worse than Takashi's and he is of no use. He follows Takashi too.
Yukari Ashikawa (芦川ゆかり, Ashikawa Yukari)
Voiced by: Haruna Ikezawa
Yukari is brought along by Toshio. Her behavior is very good, but when she is excited, she uses rough language. She is very clever and solves almost all questions. She follows Takashi too.
M-1
Voiced by: Junpei Takiguchi
The God of Math, Fredrich. He asks Takashi to rescue Alice. During Takashi's adventure, he helps them with magic 3 times per world. But sometimes the magic fails.
Namekuji-neko (なめくじネコ)
Voiced by: Tomohiro Nishimura
Namekuji-neko is a mysterious creature. Its figure seems like a cat, but its body looks like a slug, and it always floats. It follows Takashi as a guide of Wonderland. But it does not know essential things and it often escapes when Takashi is in a pinch.
Nisimura-kun (西村くん)
Voiced by: Hideyuki Umezu
Nishimura-kun is mysterious character. He speaks like a woman. Takashi often meets a disguised Nishimura-kun. It is not known whether he is a friend of Takashi or not, because his advice sometimes rescues Takashi, but at other times entraps him.
Eiichiro Shono (翔野鋭一朗, Shono Eiichiro)
Shono is a classmate of Takashi. He has no friends. He is possessed by the devil and he kidnaps Alice. He is fat, but he is a handsome boy when he is possessed by the devil.
Alice (アリス)
Voiced by: Megumi Toyoguchi
The heroine of Alice in Wonderland. She is kidnapped, and transferred to several worlds.

== Music ==
Opening theme
"S.O.S." (Short Version)

Lyrics: Yū Aku
Music: Shunichi Tokura
Arrangement: Kenichi Kamio
Performed by Motoko Kumai, Kyousei Tsukui, Haruna Ikezawa, and Megumi Toyoguchi

"S.O.S." (Long Version)

Arrangement: Toshiyuki Ōmori
Performed by Haruna Ikezawa and Megumi Toyoguchi
