= Pepper Keibu (album) =

Studio album by Pink Lady
- Released: January 25, 1977
- Recorded: 1975
- Genre: J-pop; kayōkyoku; disco; teen pop
- Language: Japanese
- Label: Victor
- Producer: Hisahiko Iida

Pink Lady chronology
| Pepper Keibu (1977) | Challenge Concert (1977) |

Singles from Pepper Keibu
- 1. "Pepper Keibu" Released: August 25, 1976; 2. "S.O.S." Released: November 25, 1976

Pepper Keibu (ペッパー警部, Peppā Keibu; lit. Inspector Pepper) is the debut album by Japanese idol duo Pink Lady, released through Victor Entertainment on January 25, 1977. It contains their first two singles: the title track and "S.O.S.", as well as Japanese-language covers of Bay City Rollers songs. The cassette and 8-track versions were released as Pink Lady wo Dōzo (ピンク・レディをどうぞ, Pinku Redī wo Dōzo; Pink Lady Please).

The album peaked at No. 2 on Oricon's weekly albums chart and sold over 135,000 copies, with the cassette/8-track releases selling an additional 5,000 copies.

== Track listing ==
All lyrics are written by Yū Aku, except where indicated; all music is composed by Shunichi Tokura, except where indicated.

Side A
| No. | Title | Arrangement | Length |
|---|---|---|---|
| 1. | "Pepper Keibu" (Peppā Keibu (ペッパー警部; "Inspector Pepper")) | Tokura | 3:17 |
| 2. | "Inspiration" (Insupirēshon (インスピレーション) (Kei solo)) | Katsunori Ishida | 3:51 |
| 3. | "Kanpai Ojōsan" ((乾杯お嬢さん; "Cheers, Miss")) | Tokura | 3:12 |
| 4. | "Pink no Ringo" (Pinku no Ringo (ピンクの林檎; "Pink Apple")) | Tokura | 3:03 |
| 5. | "Yūutsubi" ((ゆううつ日; "Day of Depression") (Mie solo)) | Ishida | 3:32 |
| 6. | "S.O.S." | Tokura | 2:45 |

Side B
| No. | Title | Writer(s) | Arrangement | Length |
|---|---|---|---|---|
| 1. | "I Only Want to Be with You" (Futaridake no Dēto (二人だけのデート; "Date for Two")) | Fumiko Okada; Mike Hawker; Ivor Raymonde | Akano Tachio | 3:49 |
| 2. | "Keep on Dancing" (Asa Made Odorō (朝まで踊ろう; "Let's Dance till the Morning")) | Okada; Allen A. Jones; Andrew Love; Richard Shann | Ishida | 2:54 |
| 3. | "Money Honey" (Manī Hanī (マネー・ハニー)) | Okada; Eric Faulkner; Stuart Wood | Ishida | 3:45 |
| 4. | "Angel Baby" (Enjeru Beibī (エンジェル・ベイビー)) | Okada; Faulkner; Wood | Ishida | 4:05 |
| 5. | "Rock and Roll Love Letter" (Rokkun Rōru Rabu Retā (ロックン・ロール・ラブレター)) | Okada; Tim Moore | Tachio | 2:57 |
| 6. | "Bye Bye Baby" (Bai Bai Beibī (バイ・バイ・ベイビー)) | Okada; Bob Gaudio; Bob Crewe | Ishida | 2:44 |

== Charts ==
| Chart (1977) | Peak position |
|---|---|
| Japanese Oricon Albums Chart | 2 |

== See also ==
- 1977 in Japanese music
