= 1978 in Japanese music =

Japanese music accounted for fifty-eight percent of record sales in the Japanese music market in 1978 (Shōwa 53), the rest being sales of foreign music. During that year, Japan continued to have the second largest music market in the world.

== Awards, contests and festivals ==
The 20th Osaka International Festival (Japanese: 大阪国際フェスティバル) was held from 10 April to 5 October 1978. The 15th Yamaha Popular Song Contest was held on 7 May 1978. The 7th Tokyo Music Festival was held on 18 June 1978. The 16th Yamaha Popular Song Contest was held on 1 October 1978. The final of the 9th World Popular Song Festival was held on 12 November 1978. The final of the 7th FNS Music Festival was held on 19 December 1978. The 20th Japan Record Awards were held on 31 December 1978. The 29th NHK Kōhaku Uta Gassen was held on 31 December 1978.

The 27th Otaka prize was won by Teizo Matsumura.

== Concerts ==
The Candies Final Carnival concert was held on 4 April 1978.

== Number one singles ==
Oricon

The following reached number 1 on the weekly Oricon Singles Chart:

Issue date	Song	Artist(s)
2 January	"UFO"	Pink Lady
9 January	"UFO"	Pink Lady
16 January	"UFO"	Pink Lady
23 January	"UFO"	Pink Lady
30 January	"UFO"	Pink Lady
6 February	"UFO"	Pink Lady
13 February	"UFO"	Pink Lady
20 February	"UFO"	Pink Lady
27 February	"Canada Kara no Tegami"	Masaaki Hirao & Yōko Hatanaka
6 March	"Canada Kara no Tegami"	Masaaki Hirao & Yōko Hatanaka
13 March	"Hohoemi Gaeshi"	Candies
20 March	"Hohoemi Gaeshi"	Candies
27 March	"Hohoemi Gaeshi"	Candies
3 April	"Southpaw"	Pink Lady
10 April	"Southpaw"	Pink Lady
17 April	"Southpaw"	Pink Lady
24 April	"Southpaw"	Pink Lady
1 May	"Southpaw"	Pink Lady
8 May	"Southpaw"	Pink Lady
15 May	"Southpaw"	Pink Lady
22 May	"Southpaw"	Pink Lady
29 May	"Southpaw"	Pink Lady
5 June	"Darling"	Kenji Sawada
12 June	"Jikan yo Tomare"	Eikichi Yazawa
19 June	"Jikan yo Tomare"	Eikichi Yazawa
26 June	"Jikan yo Tomare"	Eikichi Yazawa
3 July	"Mr. Summertime"	Circus
10 July	"Monster"	Pink Lady
17 July	"Monster"	Pink Lady
24 July	"Monster"	Pink Lady
31 July	"Monster"	Pink Lady
7 August	"Monster"	Pink Lady
14 August	"Monster"	Pink Lady
21 August	"Monster"	Pink Lady
28 August	"Monster"	Pink Lady
4 September	"Hikigane"	Masanori Sera & Twist
11 September	"Kimi no Hitomi wa 10,000 Volt"	Takao Horiuchi
18 September	"Kimi no Hitomi wa 10,000 Volt"	Takao Horiuchi
25 September	"Kimi no Hitomi wa 10,000 Volt"	Takao Horiuchi
2 October	"Tomei Ningen"	Pink Lady
9 October	"Kimi no Hitomi wa 10,000 Volt"	Takao Horiuchi
16 October	"Tomei Ningen"	Pink Lady
23 October	"Tomei Ningen"	Pink Lady
30 October	"Tomei Ningen"	Pink Lady
6 November	"Kisetsu no Naka de"	Chiharu Matsuyama
13 November	"Kisetsu no Naka de"	Chiharu Matsuyama
20 November	"Kisetsu no Naka de"	Chiharu Matsuyama
27 November	"Kisetsu no Naka de"	Chiharu Matsuyama
4 December	"Kisetsu no Naka de"	Chiharu Matsuyama
11 December	"Kisetsu no Naka de"	Chiharu Matsuyama
18 December	"Chameleon Army"	Pink Lady
25 December	"Chameleon Army"	Pink Lady

== Number one albums and LPs ==
Cash Box

The following reached number 1 on the Cash Box chart:

- 14 January, 21 January, 28 January, 11 February, 25 February, 11 March, 18 March, 25 March and 1 April: Pink Lady Best Hit Album - Pink Lady
- 8 April and 15 April: Feel Happy - Shinji Harada
- 22 April and 29 April: Shikashu (Anthology) - Masashi Sada
- 13 May, 3 June, 10 June and 24 June: Alice VI - Alice
- 8 July, 15 July, 22 July and 29 July: Gold Rush - Eikichi Yazawa
- 5 August, 2 September, 16 September, 23 September and 30 September: Soundtrack of "Saturday Night Fever"
- 12 August: Masanori Sera & Twist - Masanori Sera & Twist

Oricon

The following reached number 1 on the Oricon LP chart:

- 9 January, 16 January, 23 January, 30 January, 6 February, 13 February, 20 February and 27 February: Pink Lady Best Hit Album - Pink Lady
- 6 March, 13 March, 20 March and 27 March: Feel Happy - Shinji Harada
- 3 April and 10 April: Shikashu (Anthology) - Masashi Sada
- 17 April, 24 April, 1 May, 8 May, 22 May and 29 May: Alice VI - Alice
- 15 May: Kaguyahime Today (Kaguyahime Kyō) - Kaguyahime
- 5 June: Candies Final Carnival Plus One - Candies
- 12 June, 19 June, 26 June, 3 July and 10 July: Gold Rush - Eikichi Yazawa
- 17 July, 7 August, 14 August, 21 August, 28 August, 4 September, 11 September and 18 September: Soundtrack of "Saturday Night Fever"
- 24 July and 31 July: Masanori Sera & Twist - Masanori Sera & Twist
- 25 September, 7 October and 9 October: Aitsu Ga Shinda Ban (Japanese: あいつが死んだ晩) - Takao Horiuchi
- 16 October, 23 October, 30 October, 6 November, 13 November, 20 November and 27 November: Eikou E No Dasshutsu ~ Budoukan Live - Alice
- 4 December: Aruki Tsuzukeru Toki - Chiharu Matsuyama
- 11 December and 25 December: Kon Na Sizuka Na Yoru - Kōsetsu Minami
- 18 December: Live Korakuen Stadium - Eikichi Yazawa

== Annual charts ==
Pink Lady's UFO was number 1 in the Oricon annual singles chart.

== Film and television ==
The music of Empire of Passion, by Tōru Takemitsu, won the 33rd Mainichi Film Award for Best Music. The music of Empire of Passion and Moeru Aki (1978), both by Tōru Takemitsu, won the 2nd Japan Academy Film Prize for Best Music (awarded in 1979). Saraba Uchusenkan Yamato Ai No Senshitachi Ongaku-shū is the soundtrack album of Farewell to Space Battleship Yamato.

The Best Ten was first broadcast on 19 January 1978.

== Debuts ==
There were 317 debuts in 1978. The number of re-debuts was 51.

== Other singles released ==
- Playback Part 2, Otomezakyu, Zettai Zetsumei and Ii Hi Tabidachi by Momoe Yamaguchi
- Tsubasa by the Candies
- Gandhara and Monkey Magic by Godiego
- 25 July: Cinderella Honeymoon by Hiromi Iwasaki

== Other albums released ==
- Yellow Magic Orchestra by Yellow Magic Orchestra
- Thousand Knives by Ryuichi Sakamoto
- Cochin Moon by Haruomi Hosono
- Saravah! by Yukihiro Takahashi
- Cosmos, Dramatic and Manjushaka by Momoe Yamaguchi
- Sōshunfu by the Candies
- Bye Bye Carnival, America! America! America!, '78 Jumping Summer Carnival and Hoshi kara Kita Futari by Pink Lady
- Magic Monkey by Godiego
- Aishiteiru to Ittekure by Miyuki Nakajima
- Pacific by Haruomi Hosono, Tatsuro Yamashita and Shigeru Suzuki
- Lucky Summer Lady and Midnight Lover by T-Square
- Brasilian Skies and On Guitar by Masayoshi Takanaka
- Mignonne by Taeko Onuki
- Benisuzume by Yumi Matsutoya
- 25 April: Paraiso by Haruomi Hosono
- 25 May: It's a Poppin' Time by Tatsuro Yamashita
- 20 December: Go Ahead! by Tatsuro Yamashita

== See also ==
- Timeline of Japanese music
- 1978 in Japan
- 1978 in music
- w:ja:1978年の音楽
