= Do Your Best =

1979 song performed by Pink Lady

Single by Pink Lady

from the album Pink Lady
- Language: Japanese
- B-side: "Itoshi no New Orleans"
- Released: December 5, 1979
- Genre: J-pop; disco
- Length: 7:50
- Label: Victor
- Composer: Shunichi Tokura
- Lyricist: Shizuka Ijūin

Pink Lady singles chronology
"Monday Mona Lisa Club" (1979)	"Do Your Best" (1979)	"Ai Giri Giri" (1980)

"Do Your Best" (ドゥー・ユア・ベスト, Dū Yua Besuto) is the 16th single of duo Pink Lady, released on December 5, 1979. The song was originally chosen to be the theme song for the Japanese teams at the 1980 Summer Olympics in Moscow, but Japan became one of 66 countries to boycott the games following the Soviet invasion of Afghanistan, thus affecting the song's sales. This was the duo's first single not to reach the top 20 in Japan.

The song sold 300,000 copies.

A re-recorded version of the song was included on the 2-disc greatest hits release, INNOVATION, released in December 2010.

== Track listing (7" vinyl) ==
All lyrics are written by Shizuka Ijūin; all music is composed by Shunichi Tokura.

No.	Title	Arrangement	Length
1.	"Do Your Best"	Akira Inoue	4:07
2.	"Itoshi no New Orleans" (Itoshi no Nyū Orinzu (愛しのニューオリンズ; "Lovely New Orleans"))	Shunichi Tokura	3:43

== Chart positions ==
Chart (1979)	Peak position
Japanese Oricon Singles Chart	36

== Cover versions ==
- The tribute group Pink Babies covered "Itoshi no New Orleans" in their "UFO" Type-C single in 2017.

== See also ==
- 1979 in Japanese music
