= Ayako Shiraishi =

Japanese voice actress

Ayako Shiraishi (白石 文子, Shiraishi Ayako; born April 13, 1963) is a Japanese voice actress. She retired from voice acting in 2002.

== Anime voice acting credits ==
=== Original Video Animation ===
- Gunbuster (Linda Yamamoto)
- Pocket Monsters: Mewtwo Strikes Back! (Joy)

=== Television ===
- Alice SOS
- Mobile Suit Victory Gundam (Marvette Fingerhaut)
- Psychic Force (OAV)
- New Maple Town Story (Lamb)
- Pokémon (Nurse Joy (first voice))
- Sailor Moon (Mika Kayama (ep 18))
