= Zipangu (song) =

Single by Pink Lady

from the album UFO/Southpaw
- Language: Japanese
- B-side: "Jiken ga Okitara Bell ga Naru"
- Released: March 9, 1979
- Genre: J-pop; kayōkyoku; disco
- Length: 7:30
- Label: Victor
- Composer: Shunichi Tokura
- Lyricist: Yū Aku
- Producer: Hisahiko Iida

Pink Lady singles chronology
"Chameleon Army" (1978)	"Zipangu" (1979)	"Pink Typhoon (In the Navy)" (1979)

"Zipangu" (ジパング, Jipangu) is Pink Lady's 11th single. Peaking at number 4 on the Oricon charts, it was the duo's first single since "Pepper Keibu" in 1976 to not reach number 1. It also reached number 2 on the Japanese Music Labo charts. The single sold over a million copies.

The title, Zipangu, refers to the accounts of Marco Polo on Japan.

The song was featured on the Japanese music show The Best Ten, where it peaked at #7.

A re-recorded version of the song was included on the 2-disc greatest hits release, INNOVATION, released in December 2010.

== Track listing (7" vinyl) ==
All tracks composed by Shunichi Tokura, lyrics written by Yū Aku.

No.	Title	Length
1.	"Zipangu" (Jipangu (ジパング))	3:30
2.	"Jiken ga Okitara Bell ga Naru" (Jiken ga Okitara Beru ga Naru (事件が起きたらベルが鳴る; "A Bell Rings When an Incident Occurs"))	4:00

== Chart positions ==
Chart (1979)	Peak position
Japanese Oricon Singles Chart	4
Japanese Music Labo Chart	2

== Cover versions ==
- Sue Cream Sue of Kome Kome Club recorded a cover version for the 2009 Pink Lady/Yū Aku tribute album Bad Friends.
- The tribute group Pink Babies covered the song in their "Nagisa no Sindbad" Type-A single in 2016.

== See also ==
- 1979 in Japanese music
