= Checkicco =

Japanese idol group

Checkicco チェキッ娘
- Also known as: CXCO
- Origin: Japan
- Genres: J-pop
- Years active: 1998–1999
- Label: Pony Canyon
- Spinoffs: chee's, METAMO, M@M
- Past members: Rina Tanaka; Mikuni Shimokawa; Miki Yahagi; Rika Arai; Megumi Igarashi; Asami Kumakiri; Aimi Ueda; Eriko Yoshioka; Megumi Machida; Marina Kushi; Emiko Sasaki; Mami Fujioka; Megumi Nozaki; Ran Shimano; Tomoko Mori; Eriko Matsumoto; Mayu Katō; Satomi Kaida; Hiromi Kobayashi; Ayano Ōtaki; Yuka Ōta

Checkicco (チェキッ娘, Chekikko) were a Japanese idol group that was active from 1998 to 1999. It was formed by Masahiro Mizuguchi, a producer for Fuji TV who had the idea of creating "an Onyanko Club for the Heisei era (1989-2019)". They debuted in 1998 with the single "Dakishimete". Their name comes from the phrase "Check it!", a catchphrase of Tomoe Shinohara.

There were several things about Checkicco that were similar to Onyanko Club. Like Onyanko Club, Checkicco also hosted their own TV show, called DAIBAtteki!. Each member also had her own number (ID) just like Onyanko Club's members did.

Checkicco held their final performance in November 1999, in front of an audience of 10,000 at Tokyo Bay NK Hall. They have since reunited in 2004, 2009, and 2024.

Anime theme singer Mikuni Shimokawa and gravure idol Asami Kumakiri are two well-known former Checkicco members.

== Releases ==
Checkicco has released six singles, two albums (counting their best-of album), a small number of IVs, a photobook, and a Dreamcast game. They had several subgroups such as chee's, METAMO, and M@M, however, they were not very successful (their highest selling single, "Hajimari", only sold 32,450 copies with its highest rank as 40 — this was back in the days when best-selling CDs were the ones that sold over 100,000 copies).

== Members ==
- ID001: Rina Tanaka
- ID002: Mikuni Shimokawa
- ID003: Miki Yahagi
- ID004: Rika Arai
- ID005: Megumi Igarashi
- ID006: Asami Kumakiri
- ID007: Aimi Ueda
- ID008: Eriko Yoshioka
- ID009: Megumi Machida
- ID010: Marina Kushi
- ID011: Emiko Sasaki
- ID012: Mami Fujioka
- ID013: Megumi Nozaki
- ID014: Ran Shimano
- ID015: Tomoko Mori
- ID016: Eriko Matsumoto
- ID017: Mayu Katō
- ID018: Satomi Kaida
- ID019: Hiromi Kobayashi
- ID020: Ayano Ōtaki
- ID021: Yuka Ōta
