= Ai Giri Giri =

1979 song performed by Pink Lady

Single by Pink Lady

from the album Pink Lady
- Language: Japanese
- English title: Last Minute Love
- B-side: "Himitsu no Paradise"
- Released: March 5, 1980
- Genre: J-pop; soft rock
- Length: 4:15
- Label: Victor
- Composer: Yūichirō Oda
- Lyricist: Shizuka Ijūin

Pink Lady singles chronology
"Do Your Best" (1979)	"Ai Giri Giri" (1980)	"Sekai Eiyushi" (1980)

"Ai Giri Giri" (愛・GIRI GIRI, lit. "Last Minute Love") is Pink Lady's 17th single, and their first single not to reach the top 40. The duo broke away from their disco and teen pop music, and they focused more on soft rock music.

When the single was released in Japan, Pink Lady was residing in the U.S. for the shooting of Pink Lady & Jeff, and thus had not the time to properly promote the record. It was performed on only one Japanese TV show. Unlike their previous records, they did not have any synchronized choreography for their performance.

The song sold 200,000 copies.

== Track listing (7" vinyl) ==
All lyrics are written by Shizuka Ijūin; all music composed by Yūichirō Oda; all arrangement by Ryō Kawakami.

No.	Title	Length
1.	"Ai Giri Giri" ((愛・GIRI GIRI; "Last Minute Love"))	4:15
2.	"Himitsu no Paradise" (Himitsu no Paradaisu (秘密のパラダイス; "Secret Paradise"))

== Chart positions ==
Chart (1980)	Peak position
Japanese Oricon Singles Chart	58

== Cover versions ==
- Keiko Masuda self-covered the song in her 2014 covers album Ai Shōka (愛唱歌; Love Songs).

== See also ==
- 1980 in Japanese music
