= Monday Mona Lisa Club =

1979 song performed by Pink Lady

Single by Pink Lady

from the album Turning Point
- Language: Japanese
- B-side: "Adam and Eve Super Love"
- Released: September 9, 1979
- Recorded: 1979
- Studio: Golden Age Recording; The Record Plant
- Genre: J-pop; disco
- Length: 7:37
- Label: Victor
- Composer: Shunichi Tokura
- Lyricist: Yū Aku
- Producer: Robby Adcock

Pink Lady singles chronology
"Kiss in the Dark" (1979)	"Monday Mona Lisa Club" (1979)	"Do Your Best" (1979)

"Monday Mona Lisa Club" (マンデー・モナリザ・クラブ, Mandē Mona Riza Kurabu) is the 15th single by Japanese duo Pink Lady, released only five days after their previous single "Kiss in the Dark". The song was produced by Robby Adcock, and was recorded in Los Angeles.

The 12" single featured an extended remix of the song, which has subsequently been released on the 2006 "Pink Lady Platinum Box" as "Monday Mona Lisa Club - Special Disco Version".

The single peaked at No. 14 on Oricon's singles chart and was the duo's last top 20 single in their career. It sold 450,000 copies.

== Track listing ==
All lyrics are written by Yū Aku; all music is composed by Shunichi Tokura.

7" vinyl

No.	Title	Arrangement	Length
1.	"Monday Mona Lisa Club" (Mandē Mona Riza Kurabu (マンデー・モナリザ・クラブ))	Robby Adcock; Charles Merriam	3:50
2.	"Adam and Eve Super Love" (Adamu to Ibu Sūpā Rabu (アダムとイブ・スーパーラブ))	Tokura	3:37

12" vinyl

No.	Title	Arrangement	Length
1.	"Monday Mona Lisa Club"	Adcock; Merriam	3:50
2.	"Monday Mona Lisa Club" (Special Disco Version)	Adcock; Merriam

== Personnel ==
- Mie and Kei – vocals
- Steven Hines – keyboard
- Jay Tobin – synthesizer
- Randy Mitchell – guitar
- David Shields – bass
- Alvin Taylor – drums
- Adam Rundolph – percussion
- Charles Merriam – backing vocals
- Tricia Jones – backing vocals
- Kathryn Ward – backing vocals

== Chart positions ==
Chart (1979)	Peak position
Japanese Oricon Singles Chart	14

== Cover versions ==
- The girl group MAX covered this song in the 2008 album AKU YU Vision Factory Compilation ~Writer Life 40th Anniversary~.
- The tribute group Pink Babies covered the song in their "UFO" single in 2017.

== See also ==
- 1979 in Japanese music
