= Nagisa no Sindbad =

1977 single by Pink Lady

Single by Pink Lady

from the album Best Hits Album (1977)
- Language: Japanese
- English title: Sindbad of the Beach
- B-side: "Papaya Gundan"
- Released: June 10, 1977
- Genre: J-pop; kayōkyoku; disco; surf
- Length: 6:25
- Label: Victor
- Composer: Shunichi Tokura
- Lyricist: Yū Aku
- Producer: Hisahiko Iida

Pink Lady singles chronology
| "Carmen '77" (1977) | "Nagisa no Sindbad" (1977) | "Wanted (Shimei Tehai)" (1977) |

"Nagisa no Sindbad" (渚のシンドバッド, Nagisa no Shindobaddo; lit. "Sindbad of the Beach") is Pink Lady's fourth single release, released on June 10, 1977, with a total of 1,450,000 sales, This single stayed at the number-one spot for eight weeks.

According to Oricon, this was the best selling single of 1977.

The song's dance choreography uses a beach motif, with emphasis on swimming and surfing.

A re-recorded version of the song was included on the two-disc greatest hits release, INNOVATION, released in December 2010.

== Track listings ==
=== 7" vinyl ===
All lyrics are written by Yū Aku; all music is composed and arranged by Shunichi Tokura.

| No. | Title | Length |
|---|---|---|
| 1. | "Nagisa no Sindbad" (Nagisa no Shindobaddo (渚のシンドバッド; "Sindbad of the Beach")) | 2:35 |
| 2. | "Papaya Gundan" ("Papaya Legion" (Papaiya Gundan, パパイヤ軍団)) | 2:45 |

=== 1993 CD single release ===
Released on September 22, 1993.

1. "Nagisa no Sindbad" 2:35
2. "S.O.S." 2:45
3. "Nagisa no Sindbad" (Original Karaoke)
4. "S.O.S." (Original Karaoke)

=== 1996 Remix CD single release ===
Released on August 21, 1996.

1. "Nagisa no Sindbad" (Original Version)
2. "Nagisa no Sindbad" (Remix)
3. "Nagisa no Sindbad" (Original Karaoke)

== Charts ==
| Chart (1977) | Peak position |
|---|---|
| Japanese Oricon Singles Chart | 1 |

== Pink Babies version ==
"Nagisa no Sindbad"
- Nagisa no Sindbad Type-A cover

Single by Pink Babies
- Language: Japanese
- English title: Sindbad of the Beach
- B-side: "Lady X"
- Released: August 31, 2016
- Genre: J-pop
- Label: Pan Pacific Entertainment
- Composer: Shunichi Tokura
- Lyricist: Yū Aku

Pink Babies singles chronology
| "Wanted (Shimei Tehai)" (2014) | "Nagisa no Sindbad" (2016) | "UFO" (2017) |

Music video
- Nagisa no Sindbad on YouTube

The 10-member tribute group Pink Babies covered the song on August 31, 2016 as their first physical release, with "Lady X" as the B-side. Four versions of the single were offered; each one includes two different songs.

A limited edition single titled "Le Sinbad de la plage" was sold exclusively at Japan Expo in Paris, France on July 2–5, 2015. The single includes "Armée de papaye" ("Papaya Gundan") and "Inspecteur Pepper" ("Pepper Keibu").

=== Track listings ===
All lyrics are written by Yū Aku; all music is composed by Shunichi Tokura.

Nagisa no Sindbad Type-A
| No. | Title | Length |
|---|---|---|
| 1. | "Nagisa no Sindbad" (Nagisa no Shindobaddo (渚のシンドバッド; "Sindbad of the Beach")) |
| 2. | "Lady X" (Redī Ekkusu (レディーX)) |
| 3. | "Southpaw" (Sausupō (サウスポー)) |
| 4. | "Zipangu" (Jipangu (ジパング)) |

Nagisa no Sindbad Type-B
| No. | Title | Length |
|---|---|---|
| 1. | "Nagisa no Sindbad" (Nagisa no Shindobaddo (渚のシンドバッド; "Sindbad of the Beach")) |
| 2. | "Lady X" (Redī Ekkusu (レディーX)) |
| 3. | "Wanted (Shimei Tehai)" (Uonteddo (Shimei Tehai) (ウォンテッド(指名手配); "Wanted (Fugitive Warrant)")) |
| 4. | "Pink no Ringo" (Pinku no Ringo (ピンクの林檎; "Pink Apple")) |

Nagisa no Sindbad Type-C
| No. | Title | Length |
|---|---|---|
| 1. | "Nagisa no Sindbad" (Nagisa no Shindobaddo (渚のシンドバッド; "Sindbad of the Beach")) |
| 2. | "Lady X" (Redī Ekkusu (レディーX)) |
| 3. | "Monster" (Monsutā (モンスター)) |
| 4. | "S.O.S." |

Nagisa no Sindbad Type-D
| No. | Title | Length |
|---|---|---|
| 1. | "Nagisa no Sindbad" (Nagisa no Shindobaddo (渚のシンドバッド; "Sindbad of the Beach")) |
| 2. | "Lady X" (Redī Ekkusu (レディーX)) |
| 3. | "Papaya Gundan" (Papaiya Gundan (パパイヤ軍団; "Papaya Legion")) |
| 4. | "Pepper Keibu" (Pepā Keibu (ペッパー警部; "Inspector Pepper")) |

=== Charts ===
| Chart (2016) | Peak position |
|---|---|
| Japanese Oricon Singles Chart | 47 |

== Other cover versions ==
- The song was performed live by Chisato Moritaka as part of her Pink Lady Medley in the concert video Moritaka Land Tour 1990.3.3 at NHK Hall, released on Blu-ray in 2013.
- Megumi Yuki covered the song in 1990.
- Powerviolence band Romantic Gorilla recorded a short and fast cover of this song which includes only the first phrase and the first chorus. It appeared on the 1993 demo tape and rerecorded for the 1996 Split album with Spazz.
- Trasparenza covered the song in their 2002 album Pink Lady Euro Tracks.
- Idol duo W covered the song in their 2004 debut album Duo U&U.
- The song was covered on Maximum The Hormone's second maxi single NIKU CUP.
- Keiko Masuda self-covered the song in her 2008 covers album Moichido Asobimasho: Now & Then (もいちど遊びましょNow & Then, Let's Play Again: Now & Then) and her 2012 compilation album Colors ~ 30th Anniversary All Time Best.
- Japanese rock band GO!GO!7188 also covered it for their 2008 album Tora no Ana 2.
- Ayano Tsuji released a cover of this song on her album Cover Girl 2, released in 2008.
- Morning Musume included the song in their first cover album Cover You in 2009.
- Twin sisters ManaKana released a cover of this song on their cover album Futari Uta from 2009.
- Watarirouka Hashiritai recorded a cover version for the 2009 Pink Lady/Yū Aku tribute album Bad Friends.
- Amiaya incorporated the song as part of their "Pink Lady Mash Up 2015" single.
- Meimi Tamura covered the song in her 2020 DVD CLIP&COVERS.

== In popular culture ==
- The song appears in the 2025 film Rental Family.

== See also ==
- 1977 in Japanese music
