= Monster (Pink Lady song) =

Single by Pink Lady

from the album Best Hits Album (1978)
- Language: Japanese
- B-side: "Catch Lip"
- Released: June 25, 1978
- Genre: J-pop; kayōkyoku; disco
- Length: 7:20
- Label: Victor
- Composer: Shunichi Tokura
- Lyricist: Yū Aku
- Producer: Hisahiko Iida

Pink Lady singles chronology
"Southpaw" (1978)	"Monster" (1978)	"Tōmei Ningen" (1978)

"Monster" (モンスター, Monsutā) is Pink Lady's eighth single release, and their seventh number-one hit on the Oricon charts in Japan. The single sold 1,600,000 copies, and was number one for eight weeks. It also peaked at number-one on the Japanese Music Labo chart.

According to Oricon, this was the third best selling single from 1978.

"Catch Lip", the B-side song, was used for commercials promoting Snow Brand's Hōseki-bako ice cream.

The song was performed on Pink Lady and Jeff along with "UFO," making those two the only Pink Lady songs to be performed on the show.

A re-recorded version of the song was included on the 2-disc greatest hits release, INNOVATION released in December 2010.

== Track listing (7" vinyl) ==
All lyrics are written by Yū Aku; all music is composed and arranged by Shunichi Tokura.

No.	Title	Length
1.	"Monster" (Monsutā (モンスター))	4:30
2.	"Catch Lip" (Kyatchi Rippu (キャッチ・リップ))	2:50

== Charts ==
Chart (1978)	Peak position
Japanese Oricon Singles Chart	1
Japanese Music Labo Chart	1

== Cover versions ==
- Sudirman Arshad of Malaysia recorded a cover version of this song in Malay in 1979, titled "Toyol" in his "Perasaan" album. Toyol is a Malaysian fabled monster who steals valuables and money from people under the command of its master, who in return has to feed it with his own blood by allowing it to bite his big toe.
- Yukana Nogami and Mayumi Iizuka covered the song as the first ending theme of the 1995 anime OVA series Hyper Doll.
- Trasparenza covered the song in their 2002 album Pink Lady Euro Tracks.
- CHINEPHILE recorded a cover version of this song in their 2003 album KAYOMANIA.
- Yu Takahashi and Nana Yanagisawa recorded a cover version for the 2009 Pink Lady/Yū Aku tribute album Bad Friends.
- UA covered the song in her 2010 cover album KABA.
- The tribute group Pink Babies covered the song in their "Nagisa no Sindbad" Type-C single in 2016.

== See also ==
- 1978 in Japanese music
