= Wanted (Shimei Tehai) =

1977 single by Pink Lady

Single by Pink Lady

from the album Best Hits Album (1977)
- Language: Japanese
- English title: Wanted (Fugitive Warrant)
- B-side: "Nigero Ojōsan"
- Released: September 5, 1977
- Genre: J-pop; kayōkyoku; disco
- Length: 6:05
- Label: Victor
- Composer: Shunichi Tokura
- Lyricist: Yū Aku
- Producer: Hisahiko Iida

Pink Lady singles chronology
"Nagisa no Sindbad" (1977)	"Wanted (Shimei Tehai)" (1977)	"UFO" (1977)

"Wanted (Shimei Tehai)" (ウォンテッド (指名手配), Uonteddo (Shimei Tehai); lit. "Wanted (Fugitive Warrant)") is the fifth single released by Pink Lady on September 5, 1977. The single topped the Japan charts at number one, having sold 1,650,000 copies, and spent twelve weeks at the top.

Written by Yū Aku and Shunichi Tokura, "Wanted" is about a woman who wants revenge on a man who has run off after stealing her heart.

With "Wanted", Pink Lady made their first appearance on Kōhaku Uta Gassen in 1977. The song also won the "Popular Award" at the 19th Japan Record Awards.

On live performances, Mie and Kei point their microphones at each other for the song's first two lines. Historically, the duo wore 1920s style party dresses (Mie in black and Kei in white) on TV performances of the song.

According to Oricon. this was the third best selling single from 1977.

Pink Lady also recorded an English-language version of "Wanted" in 1978 for international markets as the B-side of "Sergeant Pepper" (the English version of "Pepper Keibu").

A re-recorded version of the song was included on the 2-disc greatest hits release, INNOVATION, released in December 2010.

== Track listing (7" vinyl) ==
All lyrics are written by Yū Aku; all music is composed and arranged by Shunichi Tokura.

No.	Title	Length
1.	"Wanted (Shimei Tehai)" (Uonteddo (Shimei Tehai) (ウォンテッド (指名手配); "Wanted (Fugitive Warrant)"))	3:25
2.	"Nigero Ojōsan" ((逃げろお嬢さん; "Run Away, Young Lady"))	2:40

== Chart positions ==
Charts (1977)	Peak position
Japanese Oricon Singles Chart	1

== Pink Babies version ==
"Wanted (Shimei Tehai)"

Single by Pink Babies
- Language: Japanese
- Released: July 16, 2014
- Genre: J-pop
- Label: Space Shower Music
- Composer: Shunichi Tokura
- Lyricist: Yū Aku

Pink Babies singles chronology
"Wanted (Shimei Tehai)" (2014)	"Nagisa no Sindbad" (2016)

Music video
- Wanted (Shimei Tehai) on YouTube

The 14-member tribute group Pink Babies released their version of "Wanted" on iTunes on July 16, 2014. The song was also included in their "Nagisa no Sindbad" Type-B single in 2016.

=== Track listing ===
All lyrics are written by Yū Aku; all music is composed by Shunichi Tokura.

No.	Title	Length
1.	"Wanted (Shimei Tehai)" (Uonteddo (Shimei Tehai) (ウォンテッド (指名手配); "Wanted (Fugitive Warrant)"))
2.	"Wanted (Shimei Tehai) (Off Vocal Ver.)"
3.	"Wanted (Shimei Tehai) Dance Ver. (Off Vocal Ver.)"

== Other cover versions ==
- Yellow Magic Orchestra's live cover version of this song, was featured on their 1993 album Live at the Kinokuniya Hall '78.
- Female vocal/dance group Speed covered the song in the 1997 various artists album VELFARRE J-POP NIGHT presents DANCE with YOU.
- Trasparenza covered the song in their 2002 album Pink Lady Euro Tracks.
- Miz and Shiho (of the group Fried Pride) recorded a cover version for the 2009 Pink Lady/Yū Aku tribute album Bad Friends.
- Kazuya Yoshii covered the song in his 2014 album Yoshii Funk Jr. ~Kore ga Genten!!~.
- Amiaya incorporated the song as part of their "Pink Lady Mash Up 2015" single.

== See also ==
- 1977 in Japanese music
