= Chameleon Army =

Single by Pink Lady

from the album Best Hits Album (1978)
- Language: Japanese
- B-side: "Dragon"
- Released: December 5, 1978
- Genre: J-pop; kayōkyoku; disco
- Length: 8:25
- Label: Victor
- Composer: Shunichi Tokura
- Lyricist: Yū Aku
- Producer: Hisahiko Iida

Pink Lady singles chronology
"Tōmei Ningen" (1978)	"Chameleon Army" (1978)	"Zipangu" (1979)

"Chameleon Army" (カメレオン・アーミー, Kamereon Āmi) is Pink Lady's tenth single release, and their ninth number 1 hit on the Oricon charts. The single sold approximately 1,250,000 copies, and spent six weeks at the top of the Oricon charts. This was their last consecutive number one hit.

According to Oricon, this was the 10th best selling single from 1979, and it gave Pink Lady a combined total of 63 weeks at number one - a record the duo held until January 2015, when B'z achieved a total of 64 weeks at number one with their single "Uchōten".

"Chameleon Army" was used as an insert song in the Lupin the Third Part II episode "Terror of the Chameleon Man". It was featured on the Japanese music show The Best Ten, where it peaked at #4.

A re-recorded version of the song was included on the 2-disc greatest hits release, INNOVATION, released in December 2010.

== Track listing (7" vinyl) ==
All lyrics are written by Yū Aku; all music is composed and arranged by Shunichi Tokura.

No.	Title	Length
1.	"Chameleon Army" (Kamereon Āmi (カメレオン・アーミー))	3:55
2.	"Dragon" (Doragon (ドラゴン))	4:30

== Chart positions ==
Chart (1978)	Peak position
Japanese Oricon Singles Chart	1

== Cover versions ==
- South Korean singer Epaksa covered the song in his 1996 album Encyclopedia of Pon-Chak Party 1 & 2.
- Trasparenza covered the song in their 2002 album Pink Lady Euro Tracks.
- Amii Ozaki and Ami Onuki (from Puffy AmiYumi) recorded a cover version for the 2009 Pink Lady/Yū Aku tribute album Bad Friends.

== See also ==
- 1978 in Japanese music
