= Tōmei Ningen (Pink Lady song) =

Single by Pink Lady

from the album Best Hits Album (1978)
- Language: Japanese
- English title: Invisible Person
- B-side: "Super Monkey Son Goku"
- Released: September 9, 1978
- Genre: J-pop; kayōkyoku; disco
- Length: 7:20
- Label: Victor
- Composer: Shunichi Tokura
- Lyricist: Yū Aku
- Producer: Hisahiko Iida

Pink Lady singles chronology
"Monster" (1978)	"Tōmei Ningen" (1978)	"Chameleon Army" (1978)

"Tōmei Ningen" (透明人間; lit. "Invisible Person") is Pink Lady's ninth single release, and their eighth number-one hit on the Oricon charts. The single sold 1,150,000 copies, and spent four weeks at number one.

According to Oricon, this was the sixth best selling single from 1978. A re-recorded version of the song was included on the 2-disc greatest hits release, INNOVATION, released in December 2010.

The B-side was the theme song for the TBS puppet show Tobe! Son Goku (飛べ!孫悟空; lit. Fly! Son Goku).

== Track listing (7" vinyl) ==
All lyrics are written by Yū Aku; all music is composed and arranged by Shunichi Tokura.

No.	Title	Length
1.	"Tōmei Ningen" ((透明人間; "Invisible Person"))	3:20
2.	"Super Monkey Son Goku" (Sūpā Monkī Son Gokū (スーパーモンキー孫悟空))	2:55

== Charts ==
Chart (1978)	Peak position
Japanese Oricon Singles Chart	1

== Cover versions ==
- Trasparenza covered the song in their 2002 album Pink Lady Euro Tracks.
- ManaKana recorded a cover version for the 2009 Pink Lady/Yū Aku tribute album Bad Friends. The cover song is also in their 2009 album Futari Uta 2.

== See also ==
- 1978 in Japanese music
