= Southpaw (Pink Lady song) =

Single by Pink Lady

from the album Best Hits Album (1978)
- Language: Japanese
- B-side: "Accessory"
- Released: March 25, 1978
- Genre: J-pop; kayōkyoku; disco
- Length: 6:20
- Label: Victor
- Composer: Shunichi Tokura
- Lyricist: Yū Aku
- Producer: Hisahiko Iida

Pink Lady singles chronology
"UFO" (1977)	"Southpaw" (1978)	"Monster" (1978)

"Southpaw" (サウスポー, Sausupō) is Pink Lady's seventh single release, released on March 25, 1978. This became their sixth number-one hit on the Oricon Chart in Japan. The single sold 1,800,000 copies, and spent nine weeks at number one on the chart.

== Background ==
According to songwriter Yū Aku, the song was inspired by Crown Lighter Lions pitcher Tamotsu Nagai, who used an underthrow to strike out Sadaharu Oh at the 1977 All-Star Game.

The dance choreography uses a baseball motif. Traditionally, Mie and Kei wear tank tops and shorts patterned after baseball uniforms.

== Reception ==
The duo won the 1978 Japan Music Awards with this song.

According to Oricon, this was the second best selling single from 1978, after "UFO".

== Other uses ==
The duo also recorded a version of the song with different lyrics as a commercial jingle for "Shinsyu-ichi Instant Miso Soup" (神州一即席味噌汁, Shinshūichi Sokuseki Misoshiru).

A re-recorded version of the song was included on the 2-disc greatest hits release, INNOVATION, released in December 2010.

== Controversy ==
In July 2019, the cheering squad for the Chunichi Dragons stopped playing the song when after Dragons' then manager Tsuyoshi Yoda deemed that a line of a "chance theme" sang on the tune of "Southpaw" was offensive. The chant line in question is "Omae ga utanakya dare ga utsu" (お前が打たなきゃ誰が打つ; lit. "Who will hit you if you hit?"); the use of the term "Omae" (お前) is considered to be rude to players However,on 1 February 2022, following Yoda's dismissal as manager, the team announced that the Southpaw "chance theme" was brought back after a three-year hiatus.

== Track listing (7" vinyl) ==
All lyrics are written by Yū Aku; all music is composed and arranged by Shunichi Tokura.

No.	Title	Length
1.	"Southpaw" (Sausupo (サウスポー))	3:40
2.	"Accessory" (Akusesarī (アクセサリー))	2:40

== Charts ==
Chart (1978)	Peak position
Japanese Oricon Singles Chart	1

== Cover versions ==
- The song was performed live by Chisato Moritaka as part of her Pink Lady Medley in the concert video Moritaka Land Tour 1990.3.3 at NHK Hall, released on Blu-ray in 2013.
- Girl group Speed recorded a cover of this song in 1997.
- Trasparenza covered the song in their 2002 album Pink Lady Euro Tracks.
- Idol duo W covered the song in their 2004 debut album Duo U&U.
- Checkicco recorded a cover version for the 2009 Pink Lady/Yū Aku tribute album Bad Friends.
- Ryoko Shiraishi and Yūko Sanpei covered the song in the 2009 anime Natsu no Arashi!.
- The tribute group Pink Babies covered the song in their "Nagisa no Sindbad" Type-A single in 2016.
- Yōko Aramaki covered the song in her 2019 album Respect! ~Watashi ga Shōwa wo Utattara Kon'na Kanji!~.

== See also ==
- 1978 in Japanese music
