= Amiaya =

Japanese music duo of twin sisters

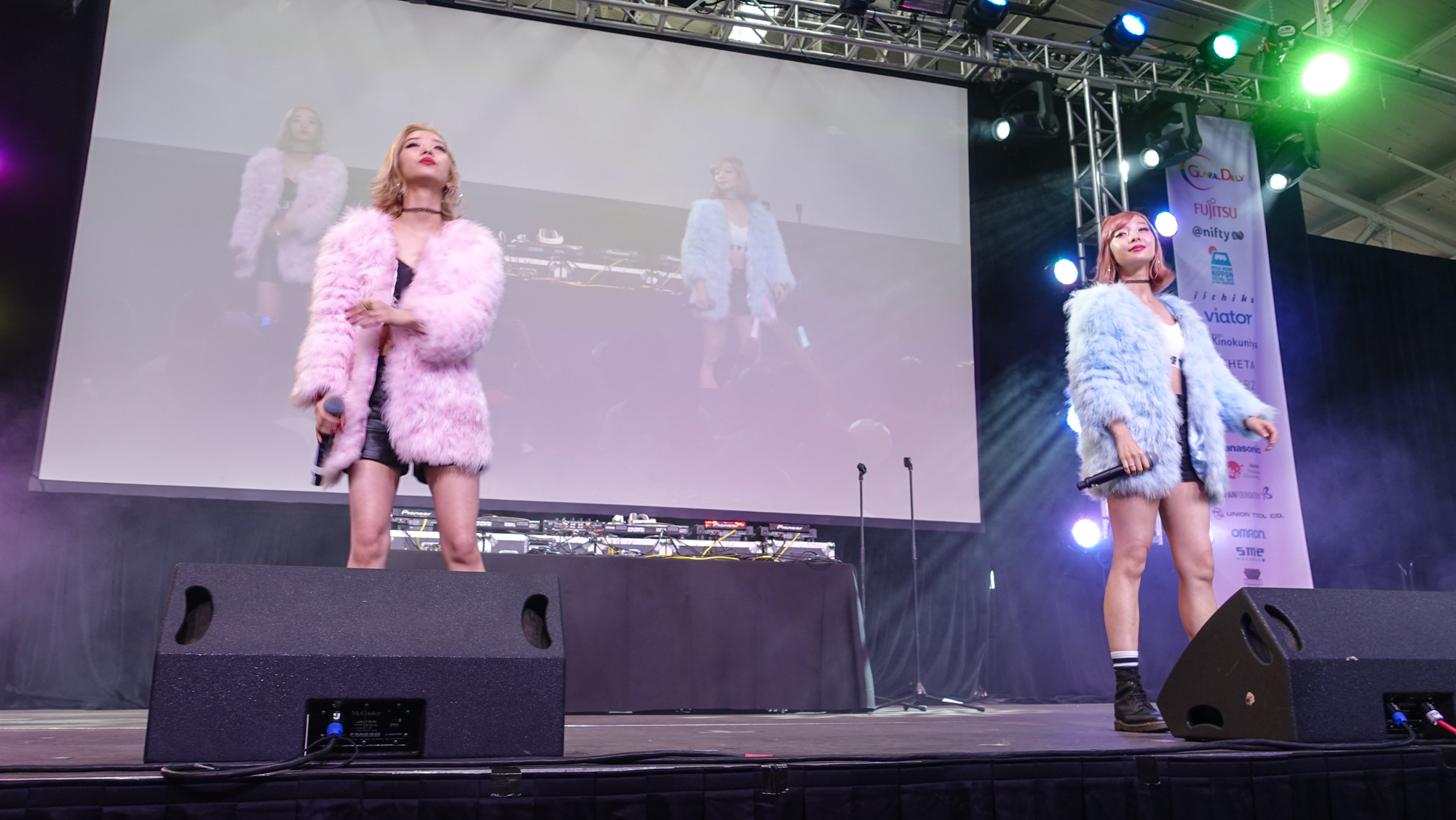
- Amiaya onstage at J-Pop Summit

Background information
- Also known as: Twinkerbell
- Born: November 8, 1988 (age 37)
- Origin: Hamamatsu, Japan
- Genres: Pop
- Years active: 2007-present
- Labels: Far Eastern Tribe
- Members: Ami Suzuki; Aya Suzuki

Amiaya (stylized as AMIAYA) is a Japanese music duo of twin sisters. Born on November 8, 1988, Ami Suzuki (鈴木亜美) is the younger sister and Aya Suzuki (鈴木亜耶) is the older sister.

The sisters are also fashion models and collaborated with Scandal for the artwork of their 2018 album Honey.

In 2019, Amiaya starred in an international commercial campaign for ice cream brand Häagen-Dazs.

== Discography ==
=== Mini-albums ===
- Tokyo Pop (January 23, 2013)

=== Singles ===
- "Magic Color" (マジックカラー) (April 10, 2013)
- "Star Line" (August 7, 2013)
- "Pink Lady Mash Up 2015" (December 31, 2014)

=== Digital singles ===
- "Play that Music" (January 16, 2013)
- "Icon (#YourIcon version)" (April 30, 2014)
- "Fairy Song" (May 21, 2014)
- "XXsupafreaks" (July 2, 2014)

=== Other album appearances ===
- "Rocket Dive" - hide Tribute VI: Female Spirits
- "26.PLAY THAT MUSIC (banvox REMIX)" - A-TTENT↑ON mixed by DJ MAYUMI

== Bibliography ==
- "Aya☆Ami " (July 16, 2010)
- "Amiaya Twins " (May 10, 2014)

== Videography ==
=== TV shows ===
- 2010: "読モTV〜TOKYO GIRLS PROJECT〜" - Regular appearance

=== Dramas ===
- 2012: "GTO: Great Teacher Onizuka" - Riko Sakaki, Miko Sakaki - S1E5
