= S.O.S. (Pink Lady song) =

Single by Pink Lady

from the album Pepper Keibu
- Language: Japanese
- B-side: "Pink no Ringo"
- Released: November 25, 1976
- Genre: J-pop; kayōkyoku; disco
- Length: 5:47
- Label: Victor
- Composer: Shunichi Tokura
- Lyricist: Yū Aku
- Producer: Hisahiko Iida

Pink Lady singles chronology
"Pepper Keibu" (1976)	"S.O.S." (1976)	"Carmen '77" (1977)

"S.O.S." (S.O.S. (エスオーエス), Esu Ō Esu) is a song Yū Aku and Shunichi Tokura wrote for Japanese idol duo Pink Lady. It was released as the group's second single in November 1976, and became their first number-one hit on the Japanese Oricon singles chart in the following year.

"S.O.S." features Morse code which stands for the song title at the opening of the song. Because its sound effect might be mistaken for genuine Morse code, the intro of the track was omitted occasionally during radio airplay. The song has been one of favorites for both the duo and the fans, and it is also one of the essential songs performed in their concerts.

== Reception ==
Led by commercial success of its predecessor "Pepper Keibu" which reached the number-4 on the Japanese Oricon chart, "S.O.S" climbed the top of the country's hit parade three months after its release. The single remained on the chart for 38 weeks, selling approximately 650,000 copies. According to the record label Victor, "S.O.S." has sold in excess of 1.2 million units to date.

According to Oricon it was the eighth best selling single from 1977.

A re-recorded version of the song was included on the two-disc greatest hits release, INNOVATION, released in December 2010.

== Track listing (7" vinyl) ==
All lyrics are written by Yū Aku; all music is composed and arranged by Shunichi Tokura.

No.	Title	Length
1.	"S.O.S."	2:45
2.	"Pink no Ringo" (Pinku no Ringo (ピンクの林檎; "Pink Apple"))	3:02

== Chart positions ==
Chart (1976–1977)	Peak position
Japanese Oricon Singles Chart	1

== Covers ==
- Cantopop singer Sandra Lang covered the song as "Rìyè péibàn nǐ" (日夜陪伴你, lit. "Accompanying You Day and Night") in her 1980 album Fēngyún.
- Kim Man Su covered the song in his 1981 album Kim Man Su 7th album.
- Kyōko Koizumi covered the song in her 1988 album Natsumelo.
- The song was performed live by Chisato Moritaka as part of her Pink Lady Medley in the concert video Moritaka Land Tour 1990.3.3 at NHK Hall, released on Blu-ray in 2013.
- American power pop band Jellyfish covered the song in two live performances on their 1993 Spilt Milk tour, which is part of their 2002 boxed set Fan Club. It was also included in the 2015 reissue of their 1993 album Spilt Milk.
- Girl group MAX covered the song for the 1997 Yū Aku tribute album VELFARRE J-POP NIGHT presents DANCE with YOU.
- Yuki Watanabe and Maria Yamamoto covered the song in episode 6 of the 1998 anime His & Her Circumstances.
- Megumi Toyoguchi, Motoko Kumai, Ayako Shiraishi, and Kyousei Tsukui covered the song as the opening theme for episodes 1-13 of the 1998 anime Alice SOS. Toyoguchi and Haruna Ikezawa recorded the song for episode 14 of the series.
- Trasparenza covered the song in their 2002 album Pink Lady Euro Tracks.
- Chiemi Hori and Tooru Yamazaki recorded a cover version for the 2009 Pink Lady/Yū Aku tribute album Bad Friends.
- The song is used as the ending theme in episode 17 of the anime series Gun Sword, covered by Kikuko Inoue, Houko Kuwashima, Satsuki Yukino, and Saeko Chiba.
- The tribute group Pink Babies covered the song in their "Nagisa no Sindbad" Type-C single in 2016. Their version of "Pink no Ringo" is included in the Type-B release of the single.
- Heavy metal cover band Natsumetal covered the song in their 2020 self-titled debut album.

== See also ==
- 1976 in Japanese music
