= Pepper Keibu (song) =

Original song written and composed by Shunichi Tokura, Yū Aku

Single by Pink Lady

from the album Pepper Keibu
- Language: Japanese
- English title: Inspector Pepper
- B-side: "Kanpai Ojōsan"
- Released: August 25, 1976
- Genre: J-pop; kayōkyoku; disco
- Length: 6:20
- Label: Victor
- Composer: Shunichi Tokura
- Lyricist: Yū Aku
- Producer: Hisahiko Iida

Pink Lady singles chronology
"Pepper Keibu" (1976)	"S.O.S." (1976)

"Pepper Keibu" (ペッパー警部, Peppā Keibu; lit. "Inspector Pepper") is the debut single by the Japanese hit duo Pink Lady. The single was released on August 25, 1976, under the Victor label. "Pepper Keibu" reached a peak chart position of number four, with a total of 1,050,000 sales. The titular song won the duo the Newcomer Award at the 18th Japan Record Awards. It was also nominated for the Best New Artist Award, but lost to "Omoide Boro Boro" by Yasuko Naitō. The original recording did not have the signature "Pepper Keibu yo" at the end, as the live performances did. Subsequent recordings and covers do, however, include the line. A number of reissues have been made, including 8 cm and 12 cm CD versions.

According to Oricon, this was the 14th best selling single from 1977.

At the time of the song's release, songwriter Yū Aku was often asked if it was inspired by the Lockheed bribery scandal in Japan, as the arrest of Prime Minister Kakuei Tanaka was fresh in the public's memories. Aku responded by saying the song took inspiration from Inspector Clouseau from The Pink Panther series, as well as Shirō Sone's song "Wakai Omawari-san" (若いお巡りさん; lit. "Young Police Officer"), Rakugo's "Kushami Kōshaku" (くしゃみ講釈; lit. "Sneezing Lecture"), soft drinks such as Dr Pepper, and The Beatles' album Sgt. Pepper's Lonely Hearts Club Band.

Pink Lady also recorded an English-language version titled "Sergeant Pepper" in 1978 for international markets. This version also included an English version of "Wanted".

A re-recorded version of the song was included on the 2-disc greatest hits release, INNOVATION, released in December 2010.

== Track listing (7" vinyl) ==
All lyrics are written by Yū Aku; all music is composed and arranged by Shunichi Tokura.

No.	Title	Length
1.	"Pepper Keibu" (Peppā Keibu (ペッパー警部; "Inspector Pepper"))	3:13
2.	"Kanpai Ojōsan" ((乾杯お嬢さん; "Cheers, Miss"))	3:07

== Chart positions ==
Chart (1976)	Peak position
Japanese Oricon Singles Chart	4

== Morning Musume version ==
"Pepper Keibu"

Single by Morning Musume

from the album Cover You
- B-side: "Romance"
- Released: September 24, 2008
- Genre: J-pop, dance-pop
- Label: Zetima

Morning Musume singles chronology
"Resonant Blue" (2008)	"Pepper Keibu" (2008)	"Naichau Kamo" (2009)

Music video
- Pepper Keibu on YouTube

A cover of "Pepper Keibu" was released by the idol pop group Morning Musume as a single on September 24, 2008 under the Zetima label to promote their upcoming ninth album, Cover You, a tribute to producer Yū Aku. The Single V DVD of the single was released on October 22, 2008. The single was their first cover single since "Morning Musume no Hyokkori Hyōtanjima" more than five-and-a-half years before. The single peaked at #3 on the Oricon weekly chart, charting for six weeks. The single was released in three editions, a limited A coming with a DVD, a limited B comes in special packaging with a 40-page photo booklet and a regular edition. Reina Tanaka and Sayumi Michishige are the only members to receive solo lines in the song.

=== Track listings ===
CD
No.	Title	Length
1.	"Pepper Keibu" (Peppā Keibu (ペッパー警部; "Inspector Pepper"))	4:11
2.	"Romance" (Romansu (ロマンス))	3:43
3.	"Pepper Keibu (Instrumental)"	4:06

Limited edition DVD
No.	Title	Length
1.	"Jaketto Satsuei Meikingu & Intabyū" (ジャケット撮影メイキング&インタビュー, "Jacket Photography Making Of & Interviews")

Single V DVD
No.	Title	Length
1.	"Pepper Keibu"
2.	"Pepper Keibu (Close-up Ver.)"
3.	"Meikingu Eizō" (メイキング映像, "Making Of")

Event V DVD
No.	Title	Length
1.	"Pepper Keibu (Another Ver.)"
2.	"Pepper Keibu (Ai Takahashi, Eri Kamei, Linlin Close-up Ver.)"
3.	"Pepper Keibu (Risa Niigaki, Koharu Kusumi, Aika Mitsui Close-up Ver.)"
4.	"Pepper Keibu (Sayumi Michishige, Reina Tanaka, Junjun Close-up Ver.)"

=== Members at time of single ===
- 5th generation: Ai Takahashi, Risa Niigaki
- 6th generation: Eri Kamei, Sayumi Michishige, Reina Tanaka
- 7th generation: Koharu Kusumi
- 8th generation: Aika Mitsui, Junjun, Linlin

=== Oricon ranks and sales ===
Daily	Weekly	Sales
3	3	46,067

== Other cover versions ==
- 1990: performed live by Chisato Moritaka as part of her Pink Lady Medley in the concert video Moritaka Land Tour 1990.3.3 at NHK Hall, released on Blu-ray in 2013.
- 1993: sung by Yūji Oda in the film Sotsugyō Ryokō: Nihon Kara Kimashita.
- 1995: sung by Noriko Sakai in a Toshiba air conditioner commercial.
- 2001: parodied by Norika Fujiwara and Sayo Aizawa for a JAL commercial promoting bargain fares.
- 2002: covered by GO!GO!7188 on their album Tora no Ana.
- 2002: covered by Trasparenza in their album Pink Lady Euro Tracks.
- 2003: covered by Kishidan drummer Shiratori Yukinojō (白鳥 雪之丞) during a "Solo Corner" segment of the concert Kishidan Banpaku 2003 (氣志團万博2003), and released to DVD as a concert film.
- 2006: covered in Chinese by Saiyū Meimei for a Suntory Oolong tea commercial.
- 2007: covered by Sayuri Ishikawa on her album Nijusseiki no Meikyoku-tachi.
- 2008: covered by Mizrock, included on the tribute album Ga-Ki (Yū Aku Tribute).
- 2009: covered by Atsuko Kurusu and Tomomi Miyauchi on the tribute album Bad Friends.
- 2011: covered by DJ Sasa & Pink Beat Bop on the album "Pink Reggae (ピンク・レゲエ)".
- 2015: parodied by Mizuki Yamamoto and Rikako Sakata for an Aoki Holdings commercial.
- 2015: incorporated by Amiaya as part of their "Pink Lady Mash Up 2015" single.
- 2016: covered by the tribute group Pink Babies in their "Nagisa no Sindbad" Type-D single.

== See also ==
- 1976 in Japanese music
