= Carmen '77 =

Single by Pink Lady

from the album Best Hits Album (1977)
- Language: Japanese
- B-side: "Pipe no Kaijin"
- Released: March 10, 1977
- Genre: J-pop; kayōkyoku; disco
- Length: 6:25
- Label: Victor
- Composer: Shunichi Tokura
- Lyricist: Yū Aku
- Producer: Hisahiko Iida

Pink Lady singles chronology
"S.O.S." (1976)	"Carmen '77" (1977)	"Nagisa no Sindbad" (1977)

"Carmen '77" (カルメン'77, Karumen Nana-jū Nana) is Pink Lady's third single release in Japan. Inspired by the novella Carmen, the song was written by Yū Aku and Shunichi Tokura, and was released on March 10, 1977. The single sold in excess of 1,100,000 copies, and reached the number-one position on the Oricon charts in April 1977, and maintained its place at number one for five weeks. It also reached the number-one position on the Japanese Music Labo charts.

The song's dance choreography incorporates elements of flamenco and European marionette theatre. Traditionally, Mie and Kei wore white dresses decorated with roses while performing this song.

According to Oricon it was the seventh best selling single from 1977.

A re-recorded version of the song was included on the two-disc greatest hits release, Innovation, released in December 2010.

== Track listing (7" vinyl) ==
All lyrics are written by Yū Aku; all music is composed and arranged by Shunichi Tokura.

No.	Title	Length
1.	"Carmen '77" (Karumen Nana-jū Nana (カルメン'77))	3:35
2.	"Pipe no Kaijin" (Paipu no Kaijin (パイプの怪人; "Phantom of the Pipe"))	2:50

== Chart positions ==
Charts (1977)	Peak position
Japanese Oricon Singles Chart	1
Japanese Music Labo Chart	1

== Covers ==
- Speed covered the song for the 1997 Yū Aku tribute album VELFARRE J-POP NIGHT presents DANCE with YOU.
- Trasparenza covered the song in their 2002 album Pink Lady Euro Tracks.
- Korean duo Red Pepper Girls covered the song in 2008.
- Ruriko Kubō and Kyōko (formerly of the Barbee Boys) recorded a cover version for the 2009 Pink Lady/Yū Aku tribute album Bad Friends.
- In 2019, Momoiro Clover Z recorded their version of the song titled "Radisma '19" (ラジスマ'19, Rajisuma Jūkyū) to promote Radisma Hybrid Radio, an Internet-based FM radio service.

== See also ==
- 1977 in Japanese music
