= Shizuka Ijūin =

Japanese writer and lyricist (1950–2023)

- 伊集院静
- Born: Tadaki Nishiyama; 9 February 1950; Hōfu, Yamaguchi Prefecture, Japan
- Died: 24 November 2023 (aged 73); Tokyo, Japan
- Other names: Ayumi Date
- Occupation: Writer

Tadaki Nishiyama (Japanese: 西山 忠来; 9 February 1950 – 24 November 2023), better known under the pen names Shizuka Ijūin (Japanese: 伊集院静) and Ayumi Date (Japanese: 伊達 歩), was a Japanese writer and lyricist.

== Life and career ==
Born in Hōfu, Ijūin graduated in letters from Rikkyo University and then worked several years as commercial director for an advertising agency. In 1981 he made his literary debut with the novel Satsuki, and in 1992 he won the Naoki Prize for the collection of short stories Ukezuki. Among his best known works, the autobiographical novel trilogy Kaikyo and the best-selling series of essays Otona no Ryugi, which sold over 2 million copies. He was also active as a lyricist, penning several hits for Masahiko Kondō.

=== Personal life and death ===
Ijūin was married to Masako Natsume from 1984 to 1985, when she died of leukemia, and to actress Hiroko Shino from 1992 until his death.

After surviving a subarachnoid haemorrhage in 2020, Ijūin died of intrahepatic bile ducts cancer on 24 November 2023, at the age of 73.
