= UFO (Pink Lady song) =

1977 single by Pink Lady

Single by Pink Lady

from the album Best Hits Album (1977)
- Language: Japanese
- B-side: "Lady X"
- Released: December 5, 1977
- Genre: J-pop; kayōkyoku; disco
- Length: 5:45
- Label: Victor
- Composer: Shunichi Tokura
- Lyricist: Yū Aku
- Producer: Hisahiko Iida

Pink Lady singles chronology
"Wanted (Shimei Tehai)" (1977)	"UFO" (1977)	"Southpaw" (1978)

"UFO" (UFO (ユーフォー), Yūfō) is the sixth single by Japanese duo Pink Lady, released on December 5, 1977 on Victor Entertainment.

== Background ==
As with their previous singles, the music was composed by Shunichi Tokura and the lyrics were written by Yū Aku. "UFO" is about a woman who falls in love with a man she describes as "out of this world". The original studio version only has one "UFO" chant in the beginning of the song; live performances added two chants during the instrumental and towards the end.

Live performances of the song are known for Pink Lady's silver sequin outfits and their elaborate dance choreography. The performance begins with Mie and Kei waving their microphones before doing the "UFO greeting" (placing the right open palm above the back of the head). Much of the choreography then involves exaggerated alien movements.

== Release and reception ==
With a total of 1,950,000 sales, "UFO" was Pink Lady's biggest selling single, and spent ten consecutive weeks at the top of the Japanese singles chart. According to Oricon, "UFO" was the best selling single of 1978, and the duo's third consecutive million selling single. This was also their fifth of nine consecutive number one singles. The song also peaked at number one on the Japanese Music Labo chart.

The song received the grand prize at the 20th Japan Record Awards. "UFO" was the number one song in the first three episodes of the long running Japanese music program The Best Ten, and was voted the best song of 1978 by the program.

In 2015, the song was ranked No. 4 in JASRAC's Top 10 Works Distributed in Japan. Because of its use in UQ Mobile's commercial, the song advanced to No. 3 in 2018, receiving the Bronze Award. It peaked at #2 and received the Silver Award in 2019.

== Other uses ==
In 1978, Pink Lady performed a version of the song with different lyrics for TV commercials promoting Nissin Yakisoba U.F.O.

"UFO" is featured in the Japanese video game Just Dance Wii. It was also featured, along with "Monster," on Pink Lady and Jeff, making them the only two Pink Lady songs to be performed on that show.

Pink Lady re-recorded the song for their 2010 double-album INNOVATION.

Far East Mention Mannequins, or FEMM, released their own cover of the song in 2016.

== Track listing (7" vinyl) ==
All lyrics are written by Yū Aku; all music is composed and arranged by Shunichi Tokura.

No.	Title	Length
1.	"UFO"	3:15
2.	"Lady X" (Redī Ekkusu (レディーX))	2:30

== Charts ==
Chart (1977)	Peak position
Japanese Oricon Singles Chart	1
Japanese Music Labo Chart	1

== Pink Babies version ==
"UFO"
- UFO Type-A cover

Single by Pink Babies
- Language: Japanese
- B-side: "Monday Mona Lisa Club"
- Released: February 15, 2017
- Genre: J-pop
- Label: Pan Pacific Entertainment
- Composer: Shunichi Tokura
- Lyricist: Yū Aku

Pink Babies singles chronology
"Nagisa no Sindbad" (2016)	"UFO" (2017)

The 10-member tribute group Pink Babies covered the song on February 15, 2017 as their second and final physical release, with "Monday Mona Lisa Club" as the B-side. Three versions of the single were offered; each one includes two different songs - one of which is a Linda Yamamoto cover. Two months after the release of this single, Pink Babies announced their disbandment, with their final show held at Mt. Rainier Hall Shibuya Pleasure Pleasure on May 26.

=== Track listings ===
All music composed and arranged by Shunichi Tokura, lyrics written by Yū Aku except "Itoshi no New Orleans" by Shizuka Ijūin.

UFO Type-A
No.	Title	Length
1.	"UFO"
2.	"Monday Mona Lisa Club" (Mandē Mona Riza Kurabu (マンデー・モナリザ・クラブ))
3.	"Neraiuchi" ((狙いうち; "Aim High") (Linda Yamamoto cover))
4.	"Muchū ga Ichiban Utsukushī" ((夢中がいちばん美しい; "The Most Beautiful Crazy"))

UFO Type-B
No.	Title	Length
1.	"UFO"
2.	"Monday Mona Lisa Club" (Mandē Mona Riza Kurabu (マンデー・モナリザ・クラブ))
3.	"Kuruwasetai no" ((狂わせたいの; "I Want to Go Crazy") (Linda Yamamoto cover))
4.	"OH!"

UFO Type-C
No.	Title	Length
1.	"UFO"
2.	"Monday Mona Lisa Club" (Mandē Mona Riza Kurabu (マンデー・モナリザ・クラブ))
3.	"Dōnimo Tomaranai" ((どうにもとまらない; "I Can't Stop") (Linda Yamamoto cover))
4.	"Itoshi no New Orleans" (Itoshi no Nyū Orinzu (愛しのニューオリンズ; "Lovely New Orleans"))

=== Charts ===
Chart (2017)	Peak position
Japanese Oricon Singles Chart	31

== Other cover versions ==
- The song was performed live by Chisato Moritaka as part of her Pink Lady Medley in the concert video Moritaka Land Tour 1990.3.3 at NHK Hall, released on Blu-ray in 2013.
- Yuko Hara covered the song under the title "UFO ~Bokura no Ginga-kei~" (UFO〜僕らの銀河系〜; lit. "UFO ~Our Galaxy~") in her 1991 album Mother.
- Japanese pop trio McKee covered the song in Tagalog in their 1996 self-titled album.
- Female music group MAX recorded a cover version of this song for the 1997 various artists album VELFARRE J-POP NIGHT presents DANCE with YOU.
- Trasparenza covered the song in their 2002 album Pink Lady Euro Tracks.
- Chinephile covered the song in their 2003 album Kayomania.
- Keiko Masuda self-covered the song in her 2008 covers album Moichido Asobimasho: Now & Then (もいちど遊びましょNow & Then, Let's Play Again: Now & Then) and her 2012 compilation album Colors ~ 30th Anniversary All Time Best.
- Japanese girl group Morning Musume recorded a cover of the song for their 2008 cover album Cover You.
- Anna Tsuchiya and Mari Natsuki recorded a cover version for the 2009 Pink Lady/Yū Aku tribute album Bad Friends.
- Chiaki Takahashi and Asami Imai covered the song for the 2009 compilation album The iDOLM@ASTER RADIO Uta Dojo.
- Melon Kinenbi covered this song in the TV series Uta Doki!
- Sumire Matsubara and Yu Takahashi covered the song for an NTT Docomo commercial in 2014.
- Yuki Murakami covered the song in her 2014 album Piano Woman ~Tomodachi kara~.
- FEMM released their cover of "UFO" in 2014 on iTunes within their digital EP Astroboy.
- Amiaya covered the song as part of their "Pink Lady Mash Up 2015" single.
- AKB48 members Yuki Kashiwagi and Mayu Watanabe covered the song for the 2017 tribute album Chikyū no Otoko ni Akita Tokoro yo ~ Yū Aku Respect Album. The album's title comes from a line of the song's chorus.
- Boys and Men covered the song in 2017.
- Honoka Minori covered the song in 2018.

== See also ==
- 1977 in Japanese music

Preceded by "Katteni-Shiyagare" (Kenji Sawada)	Japan Record Award Grand Prix; 1978	Succeeded by "Miserarete" (Judy Ongg)
