= Yū Aku =

Japanese musical artist

Yū Aku 阿久 悠
- Also known as: Seijin Tamu (多夢 星人)
- Born: Hiroyuki Fukada (深田 公之); 7 February 1937; Awaji Island, Hyogo, Japan
- Died: 1 August 2007 (aged 70) Minato, Tokyo, Japan
- Genres: J-pop (kayōkyoku, enka, rock, folk, novelty)
- Occupations: lyricist, poet, novelist
- Formerly of: Shunichi Tokura; Pink Lady; Shinichi Mori; Linda Yamamoto; Hiromi Iwasaki; Junko Sakurada; Finger 5; Tokiko Kato
- Website: www.aqqq.co.jp

Yū Aku (阿久 悠, Aku Yū), occasionally credited as You Aku (February 7, 1937 – August 1, 2007), was a Japanese lyricist, poet, and novelist.

== Early life ==
Yū Aku was born as Hiroyuki Fukada (深田公之, Fukada Hiroyuki) in Awaji Island, Hyogo, Japan. His parents both originated from the town of Kawaminami in Miyazaki Prefecture, Kyūshū, Japan. His father worked as a police constable in Hyogo prefecture. His father's career necessitated moving every few years, resulting in Aku attending three separate junior high schools. Yū Aku graduated from Meiji University.

== Career ==
Originally, Yū Aku desired to screenwrite for movies, specifically the then up-and-coming Moonlight Mask series. Aku started his career in advertisement production, which provided the foundation for his work as a lyricist. Aku worked on commercial production from 1959 to 1966. In 1964, he also took up broadcast writing. After his 1966 retirement from advertising, he continued to work as a broadcast writer and also as a lyricist. His first published work as a lyricist was the 1965 song 'Monkey Dance.'

Yū Aku was famous for contributing lyrics to many recording artists since 1967. He was a prolific lyricist, writing more than 5,000 songs. Mainly during the 1970s, more than 20 of them reached #1 on the Japanese Oricon chart, and seven singles sold more than a million copies. Over 500 of his compositions which were released as singles have entered the Japanese record chart, and they sold in excess of 68 million copies from 1968 to 2007, making him the most commercially successful Japanese lyricist up to that point. As of 2015, total sales of the singles he has written exceed 68.3 million copies, making him the second best-selling lyricist in Japan behind only Yasushi Akimoto. In 1977, he wrote the lyrics to The TV Asahi Song for the occasion of the television channel's most recent name change.

Throughout his 40-year career as a lyricist, Aku won the Japan Record Award five times. He was also acclaimed as a novelist, and produced several award-winning works. In 1999, Aku received the Purple Ribboned Medal of Honor from the Government of Japan, in honor of his long-term contributions to the Japanese entertainment industry.

On September 12, 2001, Aku underwent surgery to remove his kidney cancer. He continued to work while undergoing chemotherapy until he died of ureteral cancer on August 1, 2007.

== Awards ==
Year	Award	Song	Category	Singer
1970 (Shōwa 45)	12th Japan Record Awards	Manatsu No Arashi	Composer Award	Teruhiko Saigō
1970 (Shōwa 45)	12th Japan Record Awards	Waratte Yurushite	Arranger Award	Akiko Wada
1971 (Shōwa 46)	13th Japan Record Awards	Mata Au Hi Made	Japan Record Award	Kiyohiko Ozaki
1971 (Shōwa 46)	13th Japan Record Awards	Moeru Koibito	New Artist Award	Naoki Hongou
1972 (Shōwa 47)	14th Japan Record Awards	Ano Kane Wo Narasunowa Anata	Best Vocalist	Akiko Wada
1972 (Shōwa 47)	14th Japan Record Awards	Sensei	New Artist Award	Masako Mori
1972 (Shōwa 47)	14th Japan Record Awards	Dounimo Tomaranai	Composer Award	Linda Yamamoto
1972 (Shōwa 47)	14th Japan Record Awards	Namida	Composer Award	Jun Inoue
1972 (Shōwa 47)	14th Japan Record Awards	Pin Pon Pan Taisou	Children's Song Award	Suginami Junior Chorus & Zei Kanamori
1973 (Shōwa 48)	15th Japan Record Awards	Watashi No Aoi Tori	Best New Artist	Junko Sakurada
1973 (Shōwa 48)	15th Japan Record Awards	Coffee Shop De	New Artist Award	Shizue Abe
1973 (Shōwa 48)	15th Japan Record Awards	Johnny He No Dengon	Lyricist Award	Pedro & Capricious
1973 (Shōwa 48)	15th Japan Record Awards	Jinjin Sasete	Lyricist Award	Linda Yamamoto
1973 (Shōwa 48)	15th Japan Record Awards	Machi No Akari	Composer Award	Masaaki Sakai
1974 (Shōwa 49)	16th Japan Record Awards	Koi No American Football	Young Idol Award	Finger 5
1975 (Shōwa 50)	17th Japan Record Awards	Romance	New Artist Award	Hiromi Iwasaki
1975 (Shōwa 50)	17th Japan Record Awards	Juushichi No Natsu	General Public Award	Sakurada Junko
1975 (Shōwa 50)	17th Japan Record Awards	Geshukuya	Composer Award	Kouichi Morita & Topgalant
1975 (Shōwa 50)	17th Japan Record Awards	Uba Guruma	Lyricist Award	Sugawara Yoichi
1976 (Shōwa 51)	18th Japan Record Awards	Kita No Yado Kara	Japan Record Award	Harumi Miyako
1976 (Shōwa 51)	18th Japan Record Awards	Wakaki Shishi Tachi	Vocalist Award	Hideki Saijo
1976 (Shōwa 51)	18th Japan Record Awards	Yome Ni Konaika	New Artist Award	Kenji Niinuma
1976 (Shōwa 51)	18th Japan Record Awards	Pepper Keibu	New Artist Award	Pink Lady
1977 (Shōwa 52)	19th Japan Record Awards	Katte Ni Shiyagare	Japan Record Award	Kenji Sawada
1977 (Shōwa 52)	19th Japan Record Awards	Katte Ni Shiyagare	Arranger Award	Kenji Sawada
1977 (Shōwa 52)	19th Japan Record Awards	Shishuki	Vocalist Award/Shinpei Nakayama Award (Composer Award)	Hiromi Iwasaki
1977 (Shōwa 52)	19th Japan Record Awards	Tsugarukaikyou Fuyugeshiki	Vocalist Award/Shinpei Nakayama Award (Composer Award)	Sayuri Ishikawa
1977 (Shōwa 52)	19th Japan Record Awards	Wanted	General Public Award	Pink Lady
1978 (Shōwa 53)	20th Japan Record Awards	UFO	Japan Record Award/Gold Award	Pink Lady
1978 (Shōwa 53)	20th Japan Record Awards	LOVE (Dakishimetai)	Best Vocalist/Gold Award	Kenji Sawada
1978 (Shōwa 53)	20th Japan Record Awards	Cinderella Honeymoon	Gold Award (Vocalist Award)	Hiromi Iwasaki
1978 (Shōwa 53)	20th Japan Record Awards	Tasogare My Love	Gold Award (Vocalist Award)	Junko Oohashi
1978 (Shōwa 53)	20th Japan Record Awards	Blue Sky Blue	Gold Award (Vocalist Award)	Hideki Saijo
1978 (Shōwa 53)	20th Japan Record Awards	Shitsuren Kinenbi	New Artist Award	Mako Ishino
1979 (Shōwa 54)	21st Japan Record Awards	Casa Blanca Dandy	Gold Award	Kenji Sawada
1979 (Shōwa 54)	21st Japan Record Awards	Funa Uta	Gold Award	Aki Yashiro
1980 (Shōwa 55)	22nd Japan Record Awards	Ame No Bojou	Japan Record Award/Gold Award	Aki Yashiro
1980 (Shōwa 55)	22nd Japan Record Awards	Ginga Densetsu	Gold Award	Hiromi Iwasaki
1980 (Shōwa 55)	22nd Japan Record Awards	Sakaba De DABADA	Gold Award	Kenji Sawada
1981 (Shōwa 56)	23rd Japan Record Awards	Moshimo Piano Ga Hiketanara	Gold Award	Toshiyuki Nishida
1982 (Shōwa 57)	24th Japan Record Awards	Chigiri	Gold Award	Hiroshi Itsuki
1982 (Shōwa 57)	24th Japan Record Awards	Answer Song Wa Aishuu	New Artist Award	Yū Hayami
1983 (Shōwa 58)	25th Japan Record Awards	Nihon Kai	Special Gold Award	Aki Yashiro
1984 (Shōwa 59)	26th Japan Record Awards	Kita No Hotaru	Gold Award	Shinichi Mori
1984 (Shōwa 59)	26th Japan Record Awards	Natsu Zakari Hono Jigumi	Lyricist Award	Toshihiko Tahara & Naoko Ken
2018	JASRAC Awards	UFO	Bronze Prize	Pink Lady
2019	JASRAC Awards	UFO	Silver Prize	Pink Lady
