= Shunichi Tokura =

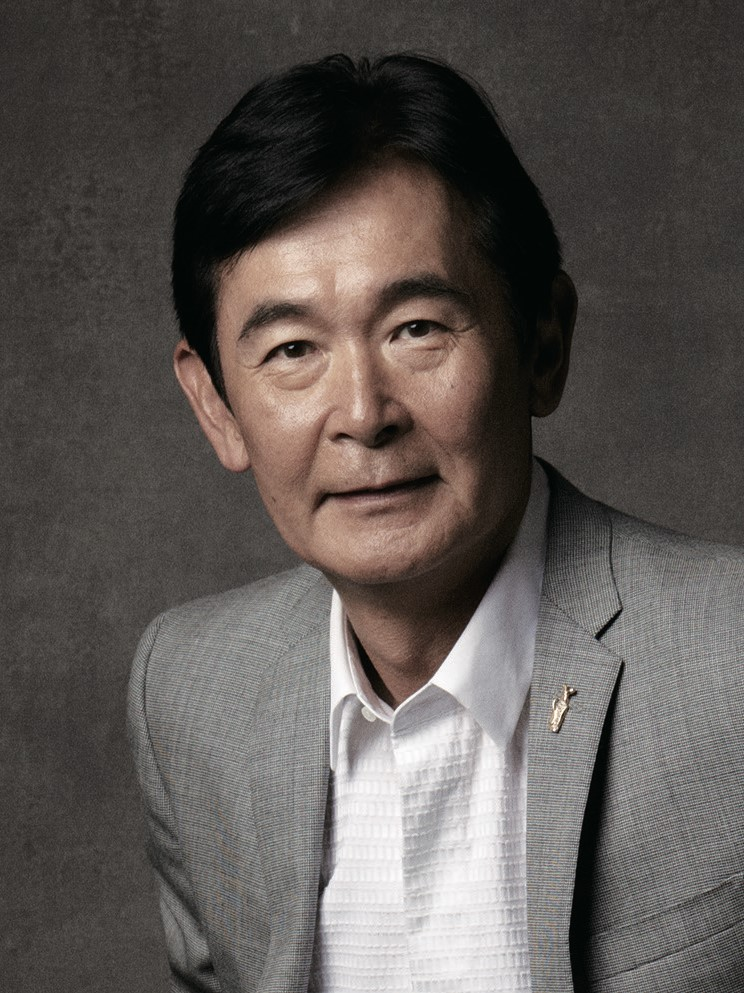

Background information
- Born: 21 June 1948 (age 78); Tokyo, Japan
- Website: s-tokura.com/biography-en/

Commissioner for Cultural Affairs
- Incumbent
- Assumed office April 1, 2021
- Preceded by: Ryohei Miyata

Shunichi Tokura (Japanese: 都倉 俊一, Hepburn: Tokura Shun'ichi; born 21 June 1948) is a Japanese composer and was the chair of the Japanese Society for Rights of Authors, Composers and Publishers (JASRAC) from 12 August 2010 to 31 March 2016. In April 2021, he was appointed commissioner for Cultural Affairs of Japan.

== Early life ==
Tokura began playing the violin at age 4. He spent his elementary and high school years in Germany where he gained a basic music education.

== Education ==
Tokura debuted as a composer while still a student at the Faculty of Law at Gakushuin University. He further studied composition, conducting as well as screening and studio production in the United States and the United Kingdom.

== Career ==
Tokura served as a member of the Council for Cultural Affairs, a managing director for the Japan Composer's Association (JACOMPA), a director for the All Japan Authors and Composers' Association and the Japan Composers & Arrangers Association, and an advisor to the Song Writer's Union of Japan.

On 7 December 2017 it was announced that Tokura would conduct the closing theme to the 68th NHK Kōhaku Uta Gassen (68th NHK Red & White Song Festival), 31 December 2017. The theme, "Hotaru no Hikari", was to have been conducted by Masaaki Hirao but Tokura replaced him following Hirao's death in July.

In March 2021, he was appointed commissioner of the Agency for Cultural Affairs following a decision by the Japanese government at a Cabinet meeting, effective on 1 April 2021.

Between 2015 and 2025, he was also a member of the Yokozuna Deliberation Council.

== Selected works ==
- Carmen '77 (Pink Lady)
- UFO (Pink Lady)
- Out of the Blue (musical)
- Johnny Eno Dengon (Pedro & Capricious)
- Dounimo Tomaranai (Brenda Vaughn)
- Azusa 2 Gou (Karyudo)

== Honours ==
- Order of Culture (2026)
