= List of Oricon number-one singles =

This is a list of songs that have peaked at number-one on the Oricon Singles Chart, the preeminent singles chart in Japan, which was created in 1967, and monitors the number of physical single purchases of the most popular singles. In December 2018, the company launched a combined singles chart, which is based on physical, digital, and streaming sales data. It follows from the introduction of Oricon's digital charts in 2017 and its co-launch of its streaming charts in the same period.

== 1960s and 1970s ==
- 1967
- 1968
- 1969
- 1970
- 1971
- 1972
- 1973
- 1974
- 1975
- 1976
- 1977
- 1978
- 1979

== 1980s ==
- 1980
- 1981
- 1982
- 1983
- 1984
- 1985
- 1986
- 1987
- 1988
- 1989

== 1990s ==
- 1990
- 1991
- 1992
- 1993
- 1994
- 1995
- 1996
- 1997
- 1998
- 1999

== 2000s ==
- 2000
- 2001
- 2002
- 2003
- 2004
- 2005
- 2006
- 2007
- 2008
- 2009

== 2010s ==
- 2010
- 2011
- 2012
- 2013
- 2014
- 2015
- 2016
- 2017
- 2018
- 2019

== 2020s ==
- 2020
- 2021
- 2022
- 2023
- 2024
- 2025
- 2026

== See also ==
- List of best-selling singles in Japan
- List of Oricon number-one albums
- Oricon
