= Two You Four You =

Studio album by Tackey & Tsubasa
- Released: November 15, 2006
- Studio: Avex Studio, Folio Sound Studio, On Air Azabu Studio, Johnny's Studio, Prime Sound Studio Form, Sunrise Studio, Warner Studio
- Genre: J-pop
- Length: 71:04 (CD); 66:46 (Limited CD); 66:46 (CD+DVD)
- Label: avex trax
- Producer: Johnny H. Kitagawa, Jun-ichi "Randy" Tsuchiya, Shinji Hayashi, Katsuro Oshita, Tomoaki Sato, Shintaro Higuchi, Michiharu Sato, Masato "Max" Matsuura

Tackey & Tsubasa chronology
yourmothersatwat (2004)	Two You Four You (2006)

Two You Four You is Tackey & Tsubasa's 2nd album to be released under avex trax. The album was released on November 15, 2006, over two and a half years after their debut album "2wenty 2wo", and contains a total of four previously released singles.

== Overview ==
Two You Four You is the second original studio album released by duo Tackey & Tsubasa. The album contains four singles: Serenade, Kamen/Mirai Koukai, Venus, and Ho! Summer (Mirai Koukai was not included on the album for unknown reasons). In all, the regular album contained a total of 16 songs, while the limited and CD+DVD only contained 15 songs.

The regular version of the album comes with a bonus track as with most of their singles. The limited pressing of the album comes with a bonus CD that will contain karaoke versions of most of the album's songs, along with a sticker. The DVD version of the album comes with a DVD containing backstage and concert footage from their "Takitsuba Izumo Concert" and behind-the-scenes footage for "Venus" and "Ho! Summer".

The title of the album is a play on the fact that both singers are 24 years old.

== Track listing ==
=== Regular CD Format - Jacket C ===
1. "Love Lucky (ラブラッキー)" (Akio Shimizu) — 4:24
2. "Venus" (Hitoshi Haneda) — 4:08
3. "Ho! Summer (サマー): Album version" (Hitoshi Haneda) — 3:50
4. "Natsu no Kaze (夏の風)" (Susumu Kawaguchi, Makoto Atoji) — 5:16
5. "Black Butterfly" (Bounceback, Paul Rein, Daniel Eklund) — 3:27
6. "Slave of Love" (Kenn Kato, Face 2 Fake) — 3:56
7. "Mermaid" (Kouji Ite, Makoto Sakuma) — 4:36
8. "Kamen (仮面)" (Hideyuki Obata, Mikio Sakai) — 5:07
9. "Rainy Memories" (Makoto Seiden, Susumu Kawaguchi) — 3:43
10. "Juunigatsu no Hana (12月の花)" (Makoto Koshinaka, LaVenDer) — 4:47
11. "Serenade (愛想曲 (セレナーデ))" (Hitoshi Haba) — 4:58
12. "Hey!! Listen to the Music" (Kenn Kato, Hiroshi Hibino) — 4:13
13. "Sayonara no Mukou (サヨナラの向こう)" (Kousuke Morimoto) — 4:40
14. "Venus: Eurobeat Remix" (Remix: Dave Rodgers) — 4:48
15. "Yume Monogatari (夢物語): Christmas Version" (Hitoshi Haneda) — 4:53
16. "Kakko Tsukanai Tonight (カッコつかないTonight)" (Hitoshi Haneda) — 4:18

=== Limited CD Format - Jacket B ===
==== Disc 1 ====
1. "Love Lucky (ラブラッキー)" (Akio Shimizu) — 4:24
2. "Venus" (Hitoshi Haneda) — 4:08
3. "Ho! Summer (サマー): Album version" (Hitoshi Haneda) — 3:50
4. "Natsu no Kaze (夏の風)" (Susumu Kawaguchi, Makoto Atoji) — 5:16
5. "Black Butterfly" (Bounceback, Paul Rein, Daniel Eklund) — 3:27
6. "Slave of Love" (Kenn Kato, Face 2 Fake) — 3:56
7. "Mermaid" (Kouji Ite, Makoto Sakuma) — 4:36
8. "Kamen (仮面)" (Hideyuki Obata, Mikio Sakai) — 5:07
9. "Rainy Memories" (Makoto Seiden, Susumu Kawaguchi) — 3:43
10. "Juunigatsu no Hana (12月の花)" (Makoto Koshinaka, LaVenDer) — 4:47
11. "Serenade (愛想曲 (セレナーデ))" (Hitoshi Haba) — 4:58
12. "Hey!! Listen to the Music" (Kenn Kato, Hiroshi Hibino) — 4:13
13. "Sayonara no Mukou (サヨナラの向こう)" (Kousuke Morimoto) — 4:40
14. "Venus: Eurobeat Remix" (Remix: Dave Rodgers) — 4:48
15. "Yume Monogatari (夢物語): Christmas Version" (Hitoshi Haneda) — 4:53

==== Disc 2 ====
1. "Love Lucky (ラブラッキー): karaoke"
2. "Venus: karaoke"
3. "Ho! Summer (Ho!サマー):Album version: karaoke"
4. "Natsu no Kaze (夏の風): karaoke"
5. "Slave of Love: karaoke"
6. "Mermaid: karaoke"
7. "Kamen (仮面): karaoke"
8. "Juunigatsu no Hana (12月の花): karaoke"
9. "Serenade (愛想曲 (セレナーデ)): karaoke"
10. "Hey!! Listen to the Music: karaoke"
11. "Sayonara no Mukou (サヨナラの向こう): karaoke"
12. "Kakko Tsukanai Tonight (カッコつかないTonight): karaoke"
13. "Special Radio Show 1"
14. "Special Radio Show 2"

=== CD+DVD Format - Jacket A ===
==== CD Portion ====
1. "Love Lucky (ラブラッキー)" (Akio Shimizu) — 4:24
2. "Venus" (Hitoshi Haneda) — 4:08
3. "Ho! Summer (サマー): Album version" (Hitoshi Haneda) — 3:50
4. "Natsu no Kaze (夏の風)" (Susumu Kawaguchi, Makoto Atoji) — 5:16
5. "Black Butterfly" (Bounceback, Paul Rein, Daniel Eklund) — 3:27
6. "Slave of Love" (Kenn Kato, Face 2 Fake) — 3:56
7. "Mermaid" (Kouji Ite, Makoto Sakuma) — 4:36
8. "Kamen (仮面)" (Hideyuki Obata, Mikio Sakai) — 5:07
9. "Rainy Memories" (Makoto Seiden, Susumu Kawaguchi) — 3:43
10. "Juunigatsu no Hana (12月の花)" (Makoto Koshinaka, LaVenDer) — 4:47
11. "Serenade (愛想曲 (セレナーデ))" (Hitoshi Haba) — 4:58
12. "Hey!! Listen to the Music" (Kenn Kato, Hiroshi Hibino) — 4:13
13. "Sayonara no Mukou (サヨナラの向こう)" (Kousuke Morimoto) — 4:40
14. "Venus: Eurobeat Remix" (Remix: Dave Rodgers) — 4:48
15. "Yume Monogatari (夢物語): Christmas Version" (Hitoshi Haneda) — 4:53

==== DVD Portion ====
1. "滝翼出雲魂咲会跳 (Off-Shot & Concert)"
2. "Venus (Off-Shot)"
3. "Ho! サマー (Off-Shot)"

== Production ==
- Art Direction & Design - White Phat Graphics
- Photograph - Tomojiro Kamiya
- Styling - Akiko Yanagita
- Hair & Make up - Yoshimi Michinaka
- Creative Direction - Masahiro Ujie
- Creative Coordinate - Hayato Mori
- Location Coordinate - Mariana Resort

== Charts ==
Album - Oricon Sales Chart (Japan)

Release	Chart	Peak position	First week sales	Sales total
15 November 2006	Oricon Daily Albums Chart	1		
15 November 2006	Oricon Weekly Albums Chart	3	73,211	93,011

Singles - Oricon Sales Chart (Japan)

Release	Single	Chart	Peak position
3 November 2004	"Serenade"	Oricon Daily Singles Chart	?
3 November 2004	"Serenade"	Oricon Weekly Singles Chart	3
4 May 2005	"Kamen / Mirai Koukai"	Oricon Daily Singles Chart	1
4 May 2005	"Kamen / Mirai Koukai"	Oricon Weekly Singles Chart	1
18 January 2006	"Venus"	Oricon Daily Singles Chart	1
18 January 2006	"Venus"	Oricon Weekly Singles Chart	1
9 August 2006	"Ho! Summer"	Oricon Daily Singles Chart	2
9 August 2006	"Ho! Summer"	Oricon Weekly Singles Chart	2

== RIAJ Certification ==
As of December 2006, "Two You Four You" has been certified gold for shipments of over 100,000 by the RIAJ.
