= List of Oricon number-one singles of 1973 =

The highest-selling singles in Japan are ranked in the Oricon Singles Chart, which is published by Oricon Style magazine. The data are compiled by Oricon based on each singles' physical sales. This list includes the singles that reached the number one place on that chart in 1973.

== Oricon Weekly Singles Chart ==
Issue date	Song	Artist(s)	Ref.
January 1	"Onna no Michi"	Shiro Miya & Pinkara Trio	
January 8	"Onna no Michi"	Shiro Miya & Pinkara Trio	
January 15	"Onna no Michi"	Shiro Miya & Pinkara Trio	
January 22	"Onna no Michi"	Shiro Miya & Pinkara Trio	
January 29	"Onna no Michi"	Shiro Miya & Pinkara Trio	
February 5	"Onna no Michi"	Shiro Miya & Pinkara Trio	
February 12	"Onna no Michi"	Shiro Miya & Pinkara Trio	
February 19	"Gakuseigai no Kissaten"	Garo	
February 26	"Gakuseigai no Kissaten"	Garo	
March 5	"Gakuseigai no Kissaten"	Garo	
March 12	"Gakuseigai no Kissaten"	Garo	
March 19	"Gakuseigai no Kissaten"	Garo	
March 26	"Gakuseigai no Kissaten"	Garo	
April 2	"Gakuseigai no Kissaten"	Garo	
April 9	"Wakaba no Sasayaki"	Mari Amachi	
April 16	"Wakaba no Sasayaki"	Mari Amachi	
April 23	"Wakaba no Sasayaki"	Mari Amachi	
April 30	"Wakaba no Sasayaki"	Mari Amachi	
May 7	"Wakaba no Sasayaki"	Mari Amachi	
May 14	"Akai Fūsen"	Miyoko Asada	
May 21	"Akai Fūsen"	Miyoko Asada	
May 28	"Akai Fūsen"	Miyoko Asada	
June 4	"Akai Fūsen"	Miyoko Asada	
June 11	"Akai Fūsen"	Miyoko Asada	
June 18	"Kiken na Futari"	Kenji Sawada	
June 25	"Kimi no Tanjōbi"	Garo	
July 2	"Kiken na Futari"	Kenji Sawada	
July 9	"Kiken na Futari"	Kenji Sawada	
July 16	"Koisuru Natsu no Hi"	Mari Amachi	
July 23	"Koisuru Natsu no Hi"	Mari Amachi	
July 30	"Koisuru Natsu no Hi"	Mari Amachi	
August 6	"Koisuru Natsu no Hi"	Mari Amachi	
August 13	"Koisuru Natsu no Hi"	Mari Amachi	
August 20	"Koisuru Natsu no Hi"	Mari Amachi	
August 27	"Watashi no Kare wa Hidarikiki"	Megumi Asaoka	
September 3	"Watashi no Kare wa Hidarikiki"	Megumi Asaoka	
September 10	"Kokoro no Tabi"	Tulip	
September 17	"Kokoro no Tabi"	Tulip	
September 24	"Chigireta Ai"	Hideki Saijo	
October 1	"Chigireta Ai"	Hideki Saijo	
October 8	"Chigireta Ai"	Hideki Saijo	
October 15	"Chigireta Ai"	Hideki Saijo	
October 22	"Kandagawa"	Kousetsu Minami & Kaguyahime	
October 29	"Kandagawa"	Kousetsu Minami & Kaguyahime	
November 5	"Kandagawa"	Kousetsu Minami & Kaguyahime	
November 12	"Kandagawa"	Kousetsu Minami & Kaguyahime	
November 19	"Kandagawa"	Kousetsu Minami & Kaguyahime	
November 26	"Kandagawa"	Kousetsu Minami & Kaguyahime	
December 3	"Kojin Jugyō"	Finger 5	
December 10	"Kandagawa"	Kousetsu Minami & Kaguyahime	
December 17	"Chiisana Koi no Monogatari"	Agnes Chan	
December 24	"Ai no Jūjika"	Hideki Saijo	
December 31	no ranking	no ranking	

== See also ==
- 1973 in Japanese music
