= List of Oricon number-one singles of 1972 =

The highest-selling singles in Japan are ranked in the Oricon Singles Chart, which is published by Oricon Style magazine. The data are compiled by Oricon based on each singles' physical sales. This list includes the singles that reached the number one place on that chart in 1972.

== Oricon Weekly Singles Chart ==
Issue date	Song	Artist(s)	Ref.
January 3	"Ame no Midōsuji"	Ouyang Fei Fei	
January 10	"Akuma ga Nikui"	Takao Hirata & Sell Stars	
January 17	"Akuma ga Nikui"	Takao Hirata & Sell Stars	
January 24	"Akuma ga Nikui"	Takao Hirata & Sell Stars	
January 31	"Akuma ga Nikui"	Takao Hirata & Sell Stars	
February 7	"Akuma ga Nikui"	Takao Hirata & Sell Stars	
February 14	"Wakare no Asa"	Pedro & Capricious	
February 21	"Wakare no Asa"	Pedro & Capricious	
February 28	"Wakare no Asa"	Pedro & Capricious	
March 6	"Wakare no Asa"	Pedro & Capricious	
March 13	"Chiisana Koi"	Mari Amachi	
March 20	"Chiisana Koi"	Mari Amachi	
March 27	"Chiisana Koi"	Mari Amachi	
April 3	"Chiisana Koi"	Mari Amachi	
April 10	"I'd Like to Teach the World to Sing (In Perfect Harmony)"; Japanese title: "Aisuru Harmony" (愛するハーモニー, Aisuru Hāmonī; lit. "Love Harmony")	The New Seekers	
April 17	"Yoake no Teishaba"	Shōji Ishibashi	
April 24	"Yoake no Teishaba"	Shōji Ishibashi	
May 1	"Yoake no Teishaba"	Shōji Ishibashi	
May 8	"Taiyō ga Kureta Kisetsu"	Aoi Sankaku Jōgija	
May 15	"Seto no Hanayome"	Rumiko Koyanagi	
May 22	"Seto no Hanayome"	Rumiko Koyanagi	
May 29	"Seto no Hanayome"	Rumiko Koyanagi	
June 5	"Seto no Hanayome"	Rumiko Koyanagi	
June 12	"Hitori Janai no"	Mari Amachi	
June 19	"Hitori Janai no"	Mari Amachi	
June 26	"Hitori Janai no"	Mari Amachi	
July 3	"Hitori Janai no"	Mari Amachi	
July 10	"Hitori Janai no"	Mari Amachi	
July 17	"Hitori Janai no"	Mari Amachi	
July 24	"Sayonara wo Suru Tame ni"	Billy Ban Ban	
July 31	"Sayonara wo Suru Tame ni"	Billy Ban Ban	
August 7	"Tabi no Yado"	Takuro Yoshida	
August 14	"Tabi no Yado"	Takuro Yoshida	
August 21	"Tabi no Yado"	Takuro Yoshida	
August 28	"Tabi no Yado"	Takuro Yoshida	
September 4	"Tabi no Yado"	Takuro Yoshida	
September 11	"Kyō no Niwaka Ame"	Rumiko Koyanagi	
September 18	"Kyō no Niwaka Ame"	Rumiko Koyanagi	
September 25	"Kyō no Niwaka Ame"	Rumiko Koyanagi	
October 2	"Niji o Watatte"	Mari Amachi	
October 9	"Niji o Watatte"	Mari Amachi	
October 16	"Niji o Watatte"	Mari Amachi	
October 23	"Niji o Watatte"	Mari Amachi	
October 30	"Onna no Michi"	Shiro Miya & Pinkara Trio	
November 6	"Onna no Michi"	Shiro Miya & Pinkara Trio	
November 13	"Onna no Michi"	Shiro Miya & Pinkara Trio	
November 20	"Onna no Michi"	Shiro Miya & Pinkara Trio	
November 27	"Onna no Michi"	Shiro Miya & Pinkara Trio	
December 4	"Onna no Michi"	Shiro Miya & Pinkara Trio	
December 11	"Onna no Michi"	Shiro Miya & Pinkara Trio	
December 18	"Onna no Michi"	Shiro Miya & Pinkara Trio	
December 25	"Onna no Michi"	Shiro Miya & Pinkara Trio	

== See also ==
- 1972 in Japanese music
