= To Be, To Be, Ten made To Be =

"To Be, to Be, Ten Made to Be"

Single by Tackey & Tsubasa

from the album 2wenty 2wo
- Released: February 26, 2003
- Recorded: ?
- Genre: J-pop
- Length: 16 min 27 s
- Label: avex trax
- Songwriters: Kenn Kato, Hideyuki Obata
- Producer: ?

Tackey & Tsubasa singles chronology
"To Be, to Be, Ten Made to Be" (2003)	"Yume Monogatari" (2003)

"To Be, to Be, Ten Made to Be" is Tackey & Tsubasa's debut single under the Avex Trax label. This is the first retail single for their 2wenty 2wo album.

== Overview ==
"To Be, to Be, Ten Made to Be" is the debut single released by singer duo Tackey & Tsubasa. The a-side song "Sotsugyou:Sayonara wa Ashita no Tameni" was used as the insert song for the anime InuYasha on episode 124, only the version of the song used was not the same version that is on this single. It was also used as the Olympus "μDigital" commercial song. The single was released in five different editions, the regular edition with only the songs, a second edition containing a video of the PVs "True Heart", "Ki・Se・Ki", and "Get Down", another edition containing the said PVs on DVD, the fourth coming with a DVD with the said PVs and extra goods, and the last one containing the said PVs on video along with extra goods.

Sample of the translated lyrics:

We're becoming memories
Your nearby warmth is no longer granted to me
My painful sighs suddenly overflowed
and whirled up faraway in the distance to reach you

== Music video ==
The promotional video for "Sotsugyou: Sayonara wa Ashita no Tameni" was shot in an unknown location by director Akie Hayashi. This PV showcases Tackey and Tsubasa singing in a small clearing, densely surrounded by bushes and vines. During the second chorus, the scene switches to the two standing up with a cloudy sky behind them. Also seen in the PV is a cage that, depending on the scene, either has two doves in it, or is empty. Once the instrumental is over, and the chorus is sung again, the two are seen standing up in the bush and vine area, only this time with sakura petals flying around them.

== Track listing ==
=== Regular CD format ===
1. "Sotsugyou: Sayonara wa Ashita no Tameni (卒業: さよならは明日のために)" (Kenn Kato, Ryouki Matsumoto) - 5:34
2. "To Be, or Not to Be" (Hideyuki Obata, Toshiharu Umezaki, Takehito Shimizu, Yuta Nakano) - 5:17
3. "Brand-new Song Medley" - 5:37
  1. "Ikiteru Akashi (生きてる証)"
  2. "Kaze (風)"
  3. "Love&Tough"

=== Limited CD+DVD format ===
==== CD portion ====
1. "Sotsugyou: Sayonara wa Ashita no Tameni (卒業: さよならは明日のために)" (Kenn Kato, Ryouki Matsumoto) - 5:34
2. "To Be, or Not to Be" (Hideyuki Obata, Toshiharu Umezaki, Takehito Shimizu, Yuta Nakano) - 5:17
3. "Brand-new Song Medley" - 5:37
  1. "Ikiteru Akashi (生きてる証)"
  2. "Kaze (風)"
  3. "Love&Tough"

==== DVD portion ====
1. "Hatachi visual mix"
2. "Ki・Se・Ki (キ・セ・キ): Get Down True Heart"
3. "True Heart"

== Personnel ==
- Takizawa Hideaki - vocals
- Imai Tsubasa - vocals

== TV performances ==
- February 21, 2003 - Music Station

== Charts ==
Oricon Sales Chart (Japan)

Release	Chart	Peak position	Sales total	Chart run
26 February 2003	Oricon Daily Singles Chart	?		
26 February 2003	Oricon Weekly Singles Chart	3	107,000	? weeks

== RIAJ Certification ==
As of January 2004, "To Be, to Be, Ten Made to Be" has been certified gold for shipments of over 100,000 by the Recording Industry Association of Japan.
