= Shinji Tanimura =

Japanese singer-songwriter (1948–2023)

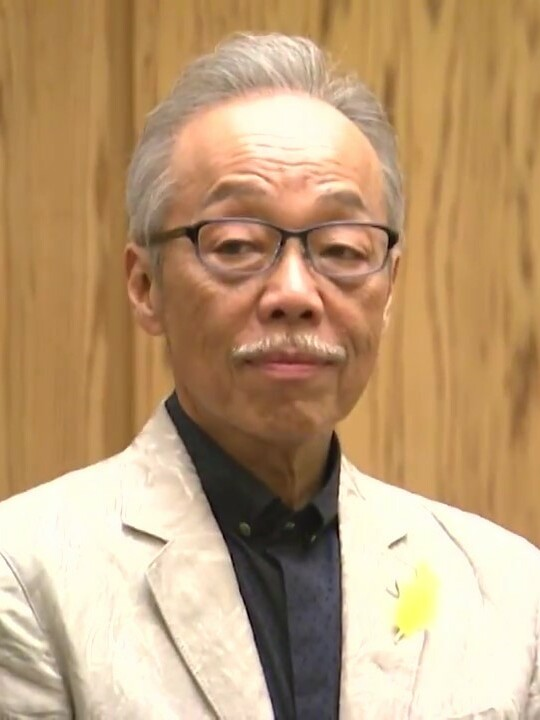
- Tanimura in 2017

Background information
- Born: 谷村 新司; 11 December 1948; Osaka, Japan
- Origin: Osaka, Japan
- Died: 8 October 2023 (aged 74)
- Genre: Kayōkyoku
- Occupation: Singer-songwriter
- Years active: 1971–2023
- Formerly of: Alice
- Website: tanimura.com

Shinji Tanimura (谷村 新司, Tanimura Shinji; 11 December 1948 – 8 October 2023) was a Japanese singer-songwriter.

== Life and career ==
Tanimura set up the musical group Alice together with Takao Horiuchi in 1971 and released his first extended play musical album in the following year. Alice produced its first album two years later. During this time, Tanimura also composed several musical pieces for other singers, such as Momoe Yamaguchi. In 1981, he held concerts in places such as Hong Kong, South Korea, Singapore, Thailand and Beijing. He also made recordings on the Japanese division of the Casablanca Records label.

Tanimura died on 8 October 2023, at the age of 74. It was reported that he had battled enteritis for some time and had surgery for the disease in March of the same year.

== Discography ==
=== Albums ===
==== Studio albums ====
Title	Album details	Peak chart positions
Title	Album details	JPN Oricon
Higurashi (蜩)	Released: 5 November 1974; Label: Toshiba EMI; Formats: CD, LP, cassette, digital download, streaming	13
Umineko (海猫)	Released: 20 December 1975; Label: Toshiba EMI; Formats: CD, LP, cassette, digital download, streaming	26
Hikishio (引き潮)	Released: 20 December 1976; Label: Toshiba EMI; Formats: CD, LP, cassette, digital download, streaming	20
Kuroi Washi (黒い鷲)	Released: 1 December 1977; Label: Toshiba EMI; Formats: CD, LP, cassette, digital download, streaming	13
Kassai (喝采)	Released: 20 April 1979; Label: Toshiba EMI; Formats: CD, LP, cassette, digital download, streaming	4
Subaru (昴 -すばる-)	Released: 25 April 1980; Label: Polystar; Formats: CD, LP, cassette, digital download, streaming	2
Umi wo Wataru Chou (海を渡る蝶)	Released: 5 May 1981; Label: Polystar; Formats: CD, LP, cassette, digital download, streaming	9
Jade: Hisui (JADE-翡翠-)	Released: 5 June 1982; Label: Polystar; Formats: CD, LP, cassette, digital download, streaming	11
Chichi to Ko (父と子)	Released: 20 December 1982; Label: Polystar; Formats: CD, LP, cassette, digital download, streaming	60
Emblem	Released: 25 May 1983; Label: Polystar; Formats: CD, LP, cassette, digital download, streaming	—
Hōyō: Satin Rose (抱擁 -SATIN ROSE-)	Released: 21 January 1984; Label: Polystar; Formats: CD, LP, cassette, digital download, streaming	13
Toge (棘-とげ-)	Released: 5 December 1984; Label: Polystar; Formats: CD, LP, cassette, digital download, streaming	9
Ningen Kousaten: Human Scramble (人間交差点-ヒューマン・スクランブル-)	Released: 1 July 1985; Label: Polystar; Formats: CD, LP, cassette, digital download, streaming	11
Kara (伽羅)	Released: 25 November 1985; Label: Polystar; Formats: CD, LP, cassette, digital download, streaming	24
Old Time	Released: 11 December 1986; Label: Polystar; Formats: CD, LP, cassette, digital download	24
Ima no Mama de ii (今のままでいい)	Released: 25 October 1987; Label: Polystar; Formats: CD, LP, cassette, digital download, streaming	35
Shishi to Bara (獅子と薔薇)	Released: 18 September 1988; Label: Polystar; Formats: CD, LP, cassette, digital download, streaming	16
Rondo (輪舞-ロンド-)	Released: 5 October 1989; Label: Polystar; Formats: CD, cassette, digital download, streaming	21
Price of Love	Released: 8 September 1990; Label: Polystar; Formats: CD, cassette, digital download, streaming	45
Kimi wo Wasurenai (君を忘れない)	Released: 1 October 1991; Label: Polystar; Formats: CD, cassette, digital download, streaming	30
Santo Monogatari (三都物語)	Released: 2 September 1992; Label: Polystar; Formats: CD, cassette, digital download, streaming	37
Basara (バサラ)	Released: 16 April 1993; Label: Polystar; Formats: CD, cassette, digital download, streaming	30
Itan	Released: 20 November 1995; Label: Pony Canyon; Formats: CD, digital download	—
Seisei Kinari (生成 KINARI)	Released: 3 December 1997; Label: Pony Canyon; Formats: CD, digital download, streaming	71
Laban (ラバン)	Released: 18 November 1998; Label: Pony Canyon; Formats: CD, digital download, streaming	94
Nakazora (半空 NAKAZORA)	Released: 12 January 2002; Label: Mama's & Papa's; Formats: CD	—
Orion 13 (オリオン13)	Released: 18 April 2007; Label: Avex Io; Formats: CD, digital download	10
Makarii (マカリイ)	Released: 11 March 2009; Label: Avex Io; Formats: CD, digital download	40
Otoshibe: Voice to Voice (音標 〜Voice to Voice〜)	Released: 2 June 2010; Label: Avex Io; Formats: CD, digital download	49
Nine	Released: 19 September 2012; Label: DAO; Formats: CD	27
Nihon: Hare Bare (NIHON 〜ハレバレ〜)	Released: 2 June 2010; Label: VAP; Formats: CD, digital download	—

==== Self-cover albums ====
Title	Album details	Peak chart positions
Title	Album details	JPN Oricon
Sobyō: Dessin (素描-Dessin-)	Released: 25 June 1986; Label: Polystar; Formats: CD, LP, cassette, digital download, streaming	—
Best Request	Released: 25 November 1991; Label: Polystar; Formats: CD, cassette, digital download	—
21Seiki Best of the Red 1972→'81 21Seiki Best of the Blue 1982→	Released: 5 March 1997; Label: Pony Canyon; Formats: CD, digital download, streaming	—
Tanimura Bungakusen 2020: Grace (谷村文学選2020 ～グレイス～)	Released: 26 August 2020; Label: Universal Music Japan; Formats: CD	48

==== Cover albums ====
Title	Album details
"Dream Song 1 (2014-2015): Chikyuu Gekijou: 100Nen go no Kimi ni Kikasetai Uta" (DREAM SONGS I[2014-2015]地球劇場 〜100年後の君に聴かせたい歌〜)	Released: 30 March 2016; Label: Universal Music Japan; Formats: CD, digital download

==== Live albums ====
Title	Album details	Peak chart positions
Title	Album details	JPN Oricon
Tanimura Shinji Recital '89 Corazon IV (谷村新司リサイタル'89 CORAZON IV)	Released: 5 May 1990; Label: Polystar; Formats: CD, digital download	55
History at Aoyama Theatre	Released: 1 May 2000; Label: mama's & papa's; Formats: CD	—
Ongaeshi Request Live Album: The Genepro (音帰し リクエストライヴ・アルバム〜Theゲネプロ〜)	Released: 19 March 2008; Label: Avex Io; Formats: CD, digital download	11
Ima Tsutaetai (今 伝えたい)	Released: 11 May 2011; Label: Avex Io; Formats: CD, digital download	—
Shinji Tanimura Recital 2022 The Singer: Yume no sono Saki (SHINJI TANIMURA RECITAL 2022「THE SINGER」～夢のその先～)	Released: 29 June 2022; Label: Universal Music Japan; Formats: CD, digital download, streaming	—

==== Compilation albums ====
Title	Album details	Peak chart positions
Title	Album details	JPN Oricon
Alone Together	Released: 10 June 1984; Label: Polystar; Formats: CD, LP, cassette, digital download	12
New Best Now 70	Released: 25 January 1988; Label: Toshiba EMI; Formats: CD, LP, cassette, digital download	—
"Best of Best"	Released: 1 February 1989; Label: Polystar; Formats: CD, LP, cassette, digital download	41
Big Artist Best Collection	Released: 2 August 1989; Label: Toshiba EMI; Formats: CD, cassette, digital download	—
One and Only	Released: 1 December 1990; Label: Polystar; Formats: CD, cassette, digital download	—
Sarai (サライ)	Released: 26 December 1992; Label: Polystar; Formats: CD, cassette, digital download, streaming	81
The Man / Shinji Tanimura Best Selection	Released: 25 October 1993; Label: Polystar; Formats: CD, digital download	68
Single A-Side/B-Side Collection	Released: 25 August 1995; Label: Polystar; Formats: CD, digital download, streaming	—
Best: Betsuri to Tabidachi (ベスト〜別離と旅立ち〜)	Released: 26 June 1996; Label: Polystar; Formats: CD, digital download	—
New Best	Released: 25 November 1996; Label: Polystar; Formats: CD, digital download	—
Twin Best	Released: 4 December 1996; Label: Toshiba EMI; Formats: CD, digital download	—
The Best Selection: Subaru, Ii Hitabidachi (ザ・ベスト・セレクション 〜昴-すばる-・いい日旅立ち〜)	Released: 26 September 1997; Label: Toshiba EMI; Formats: CD, digital download	—
Treasure Collection	Released: 30 June 1999; Label: Toshiba EMI; Formats: CD, digital download	—
Arigatō (アリガトウ)	Released: 3 December 2003; Label: Universal Music Japan; Formats: CD, digital download	—
Remastering Collection Best (リマスタリングコレクション・ベスト)	Released: 2 March 2005; Label: Ply Aid; Formats: CD, digital download	—
New Best	Released: 24 August 2005; Label: Toshiba EMI; Formats: CD, digital download	—
Best Collection: II Hitabidachi (Best Collection〜いい日旅立ち〜)	Released: 26 March 2008; Label: Polystar; Formats: CD, digital download, streaming	25
Original Album Selection (オリジナル・アルバム セレクション)	Released: 20 May 2009; Label: Polystar; Formats: CD, digital download	—
Shinji Tanimura with Piano My Note	Released: 25 January 2012; Label: Avex Io; Formats: CD, digital download	—
Tanimura Shinji The Best: Hi wa mata Noboru (谷村新司・ザ・ベスト 〜陽はまた昇る〜)	Released: 2 November 2016; Label: Universal Music Japan; Formats: CD, digital download, streaming	—
Standard: Kokyū (STANDARD〜呼吸〜)	Released: 5 April 2017; Label: Universal Music Japan; Formats: CD, digital download, streaming	11
Stage Selection Album Early Time: 38Nen me no Subaru (ステージ・セレクション・アルバム「EARLY TIMES」〜38年目の昴〜)	Released: 6 June 2018; Label: Universal Music Japan; Formats: CD, digital download, streaming	—

==== Box sets ====
Title	Album details
Tanimura Shinji Daizenshū (谷村新司大全集)	Released: 22 December 1993; Label: Polystar; Formats: CD
The Chronicles	Released: 1 December 2002; Label: Toshiba EMI; Formats: CD

=== Singles ===
Year	Album	Chart positions (JP)	Label
1979	"Hi wa Mata Noboru" (陽はまた昇る)	21	Toshiba EMI
1980	"Subaru" (昴 -すばる-)	2	Polystar
1981	"Tenrō" (天狼)	35	Polystar
1981	"Gunjō" (群青)	15	Polystar
1981	"Seinen no Ki" (青年の樹)	45	Polystar
1981	"Kaze wa Hageshiku" (風は激しく)	62	Polystar
1982	"Superstar" (スーパースター)	51	Polystar
1983	"Chiisana Kata ni Ame ga Furu" (小さな肩に雨が降る)	—	Polystar
1983	"22sai" (22歳)	14	Polystar
1984	"Tanjōbi: Arifureta Tasogare no Machi nite" (誕生日 -ありふれた黄昏の街にて-)	54	Polystar
1984	"Seishun Zankoku Monogatari" (青春残酷物語)	46	Polystar
1984	"Yorugao" (夜顔)	85	Polystar
1985	"Ai no Chikai: Give It All Today" (愛の誓い -Give it all today-)	24	Polystar
1985	"12Ban Machi no Carol" (12番街のキャロル)	53	Polystar
1985	"Keiji" (刑事)	—	Polystar
1985	"Roman Tetsudō: Tojō-hen" (浪漫鉄道＜途上篇＞)	34	Polystar
1986	"Gion Matsuri" (祇園祭)	—	Polystar
1986	"Koufuku: Shiawase" (幸福 -しあわせ-)	30	Polystar
1987	"Ima no Mama de ii" (今のままでいい)	86	Polystar
1988	"Far Away"	69	Polystar
1988	"Eiyū" (英雄)	70	Polystar
1989	"Aoi Bara: Blue Roses" (青い薔薇 -BLUE ROSES-)	—	Polystar
1989	"Otoko to Onna ni Modoru Toki" (男と女に戻る時)	—	Polystar
1989	"Miyako no Ame ni Furu Gotoku" (都に雨の降るごとく)	—	Polystar
1990	"Dreams Come True"	—	Polystar
1991	"Futari no Nishūkan" (夏の二週間)	93	Polystar
1991	"Kimi wo Wasurenai" (君を忘れない)	—	Polystar
1992	"Santo Monogatari" (三都物語)	41	Polystar
1993	"Kai: Kizahashi" (階 -きざはし-)	28	Polystar
1993	"Last News: The Man Theme" (ラストニュース -THE MANのテーマ-)	—	Polystar
1994	"Against" (アゲインスト)	93	Polystar
1995	"Messiah Futatabi" (メシアふたたび)	—	Victor Entertainment
1995	"Kimi no Soba ni Iru" (君のそばにいる)	—	Pony Canyon
1996	"Ai ni Kaeritai" (愛に帰りたい)	—	Pony Canyon
1997	"Sakuramori" (櫻守)	86	Pony Canyon
1998	"Kokoro no Eki" (心の駅)	—	Pony Canyon
1999	"Aura"	76	Pony Canyon
2000	"Harvest" (ハーヴェスト)	—	Mama's & Papa's
2006	"Kaze no Koyomi" (風の暦)	13	Avex Io
2007	"Yumejin" (夢人〜ユメジン〜)	16	Avex Io
2008	"Ii Tabidachi Hi" (いい日旅立ち)	—	Polystar
2008	"Ima Arite" (今ありて)	—	Avex Io
2008	"Tsubame" (ツバメ)	—	Avex Io
2008	"Road Song" (ロード・ソング)	—	Avex Io
2008	"Jūsan'ya" (十三夜)	83	Avex Io
2009	"Sakura wa Sakura" (桜は桜)	—	Avex Io
2009	"Musica" (ムジカ)	—	Avex Io
2012	"Hajimari no Monogatari/Bansō" (はじまりの物語/伴奏)	13	DAO
2014	"Shinji Tanimura Selection the Singer Haru: Sakura Sake" (Shinji Tanimura Selection THE SINGER・春 〜サクラサク〜)	—	VAP
2014	"Shinji Tanimura Selection the Singer Natsu: Yakusoku no Ki no Shita de" (Shinji Tanimura Selection THE SINGER・夏 〜やくそくの樹の下で〜)	—	VAP
2014	"Shinji Tanimura Selection the Singer Aki: Kaze no Jidai" (Shinji Tanimura Selection THE SINGER・秋 〜風の時代〜)	—	VAP
2015	"Shinji Tanimura Selection the Singer Fuyu: Yumeji" (Shinji Tanimura Selection THE SINGER・冬 〜夢路〜)	—	VAP
2017	"Ah/Keep On" (嗚呼/Keep On!)	—	Universal Music Japan

==== Duet singles ====
Year	Album	Chart positions (JP)	Label
1984	"Wasurete Ii no: Ai no Makugire" (忘れていいの-愛の幕切れ-): with Tomoko Ogawa	21	Polystar
1986	"Classic" (クラシック -CLASSIC-): with Eiji Okuda	—	Polystar
1992	"Sarai" (サライ): with Yūzō Kayama	20	Funhouse
2012	"Kaze no Komori Uta: Ashita no Kimi e" (風の子守歌 〜あしたの君へ〜): with Tatsuya Ishii	54	Avex Io
2015	"Hokuriku Roman: Premium Duet Edition" (北陸ロマン 〜プレミアムデュエットバージョン〜): with Yukie Nakama	27	Universal Music Japan
2016	"Arcila no Hoshi" (アルシラの星): with Kalafina	37	Universal Music Japan

== Videography ==
=== Video albums ===
Title	Album details
Tanimura Shinji: Fūshika-den (谷村新司～風姿花伝～)	Released: 21 January 2000; Label: Teichiku; Formats: DVD
Tanimura Shinji & Sada Masashi One Time Only Nippon Budokan Live (谷村新司 さだまさし One Time Only 日本武道館ライヴ)	Released: 19 November 2003; Label: Sony Music Direct; Formats: DVD
Corazon Special Tanimura Shinji Recital '91 (コラソンスペシャル 谷村新司リサイタル ’91)	Released: 26 November 2003; Label: Polystar; Formats: DVD
Kanzenban Neodragon Shūkai Orion 13 (完全版「ネオドラゴン集会“オリオン13”の夕べ@鶯谷」)	Released: 29 August 2007; Label: Avex Io; Formats: DVD
Tanimura Shinji x Aoyama Gekijou The Final: 2003 & 2014 (谷村新司 × 青山劇場 THE FINAL～2003「句読点」&2014「CURTAIN CALL」～)	Released: 16 December 2015; Label: Universal Music Japan; Formats: DVD, BD
Dream Song 1 (2014-2015): Chikyuu Gekijou: 100Nen go no Kimi ni Kikasetai Uta (DREAM SONGS I[2014-2015]地球劇場 〜100年後の君に聴かせたい歌〜)	Released: 30 March 2016; Label: Universal Music Japan; Formats: DVD, BD
Tanimura Shinji Recital in Kokuritsu Gekijo The Singer 2016 & 2017 (谷村新司リサイタル in 国立劇場「THE SINGER」2016 & 2017)	Released: 28 February 2018; Label: Universal Music Japan; Formats: DVD, BD
