= List of Oricon number-one singles of 2003 =

The following is a list of Oricon number-one singles of 2003.

== Oricon Weekly Singles Chart ==
Issue date	Song	Artist(s)	Ref.
January 6	"Love Me All Over"	J-FRIENDS	
January 13	"UNTITLED 4 BALLADS"	Every Little Thing	
January 20	"Chijou no Hoshi"	Miyuki Nakajima	
January 27	"Happy Life"	175R	
February 3	"Kuki (STEM)"	Ringo Shiina	
February 10	"COLORS"	Hikaru Utada	
February 17	"COLORS"	Hikaru Utada	
February 24	"Tsuki no Shizuku"	RUI	
March 3	"Asu eno tobira"	I Wish	
March 10	"Asu eno tobira"	I Wish	
March 17	"Sekai ni Hitotsu Dake no Hana"	SMAP	
March 24	"Sekai ni Hitotsu Dake no Hana"	SMAP	
March 31	"Sekai ni Hitotsu Dake no Hana"	SMAP	
April 7	"It's Showtime!"	B'z	
April 14	"Sekai ni Hitotsu Dake no Hana"	SMAP	
April 21	"Eien no BLOODS"	KinKi Kids	
April 28	"Sora ni utaeba"	175R	
May 5	"As for One Day"	Morning Musume	
May 12	"Sakura"	Naotarō Moriyama	
May 19	"Sakura"	Naotarō Moriyama	
May 26	"Sakura"	Naotarō Moriyama	
June 2	"Super Lover"	w-inds	
June 9	"Darling"	V6	
June 16	"Hello"	Hyde	
June 23	"KI"	Kōshi Inaba	
June 30	"Kokoro ni yume o kimi ni wa ai"	KinKi Kids	
July 7	"Katte ni Sindbad"	Southern All Stars	
July 14	"Cosmic Rescue"	V6	
July 21	"&"	Ayumi Hamasuki	
July 28	"Yasei no ENERGY"	B'z	
August 4	"Namida no umi de dakaretai"	Southern All Stars	
August 11	"Namida no umi de dakaretai"	Southern All Stars	
August 18	"Ashita e Kaeru"	Chemistry	
August 25	"Hakka Candy"	KinKi Kids	
September 1	"Forgiveness"	Ayumi Hamasuki	
September 8	"Niji / Himawari / Sore ga Subete sa"	Masaharu Fukuyama	
September 15	"Niji / Himawari / Sore ga Subete sa"	Masaharu Fukuyama	
September 22	"Niji / Himawari / Sore ga Subete sa"	Masaharu Fukuyama	
September 29	"Niji / Himawari / Sore ga Subete sa"	Masaharu Fukuyama	
October 6	"Niji / Himawari / Sore ga Subete sa"	Masaharu Fukuyama	
October 13	"Ambitious Japan!"	Tokio	
October 20	"Imitation Gold"	Tak Matsumoto feat. Mai Kuraki	
October 27	"Beautiful Dreamer/Street Life"	Glay	
November 3	"Hokōsha yūsen"	Yuzu	
November 10	"Long Road"	w-inds	
November 17	"No way to say"	Ayumi Hamasaki	
November 24	"Yumemonogatari"	Tackey & Tsubasa	
December 1	"Tenohira"	Mr. Children	
December 8	"Tenohira"	Mr. Children	
December 15	"Lack"	Porno Graffiti	
December 22	"Yorokobi no Uta"	MONGOL800	
December 29	"Yorokobi no Uta"	MONGOL800	
