= List of Oricon number-one singles of 2006 =

The highest-selling singles in Japan are ranked in the Oricon Singles Chart, which is published by Oricon Style magazine. The data are compiled by Oricon based on each singles' physical sales. This list includes the singles that reached the number one place on that chart in 2006.

== Oricon Weekly Singles Chart ==
Issue date	Song	Artist(s)	Ref.
January 2	"SNOW! SNOW! SNOW!"	KinKi Kids	
January 16	"Seishun Amigo"	Shūji to Akira	
January 23	"Feel"	Kumi Koda	
January 30	"Venus"	Tackey and Tsubasa	
February 6	"Shōdō"	B'z	
February 13	"Yoshino Cherry"	Tsuyoshi Domoto	
February 20	"Mr. Traveling Man"	Tokio	
February 27	"World Apart"	Asian Kung-Fu Generation	
March 6	"Season's Call"	Hyde	
March 13	"Yes!"	Exile	
March 20	"Startin'/Born to Be..."	Ayumi Hamasaki	
March 27	"Sayaendō/Hadashi no Cinderella Boy"	News	
April 3	"Real Face"	KAT-TUN	
April 10	"Real Face"	KAT-TUN	
April 17	"Real Face"	KAT-TUN	
April 24	"Yuruginai Mono Hitotsu"	B'z	
May 1	"Dear Woman"	SMAP	
May 8	"Tabiudo"	Ketsumeishi	
May 15		Ketsumeishi	
May 22	"Champione"	Orange Range	
May 29	"Kitto Daijōbu"	Arashi	
June 5	"Milk Tea/Utsukushiki Hana"	Masaharu Fukuyama	
June 12	"Daite Señorita"	Tomohisa Yamashita	
June 19	"Splash!"	B'z	
June 26	"Good Day!!"	V6	
July 3	"Blue Bird"	Ayumi Hamasaki	
July 10	"The Rainbow Star"	Tsuyoshi Domoto	
July 17	"Houkiboshi"	Mr. Children	
July 24	"Deep in your heart/+Million But -Love"	Koichi Domoto	
July 31	"Signal"	KAT-TUN	
August 7	"Natsu Moyō"	KinKi Kids	
August 14	"Aozora Pedal"	Arashi	
August 21	"Dirty Old Man ~Saraba Natsu yo~"	Southern All Stars	
August 28	"Akatsuki no Uta"	Sukima Switch	
September 4	"Sorafune/Do! Do! Do!"	Tokio	
September 11	"Fever to Future"	Golf & Mike	
September 18	"Taiyou no Uta"	Erika Sawajiri	
September 25	"Natsuoto/Henna Yume: Thousand Dreams"	Glay	
October 2	"Taiyou no Uta"	Erika Sawajiri	
October 9	"Mikazuki"	Ayaka	
October 16	"Winding Road"	Porno Graffitti	
October 23	"Arigato"	SMAP	
October 30	"Yume no Uta/Futari de..."	Kumi Koda	
November 6	"Seaside Byebye"	Kisarazu Cat's Eye & MCU	
November 13	"Ready Go!"	WaT	
November 20	"Aruiteru"	Morning Musume	
November 27	"Shirushi"	Mr. Children	
December 4	"Namida no Furusato"	Bump of Chicken	
December 11	"Harmony of December"	KinKi Kids	
December 18	"Bokura no Machi de"	KAT-TUN	
December 25	"Kan Fu Fighting"	Kanjani Eight	
