= Kanda River =

River in Tokyo, Japan

Coordinates: 35°41′42″N 139°47′17″E

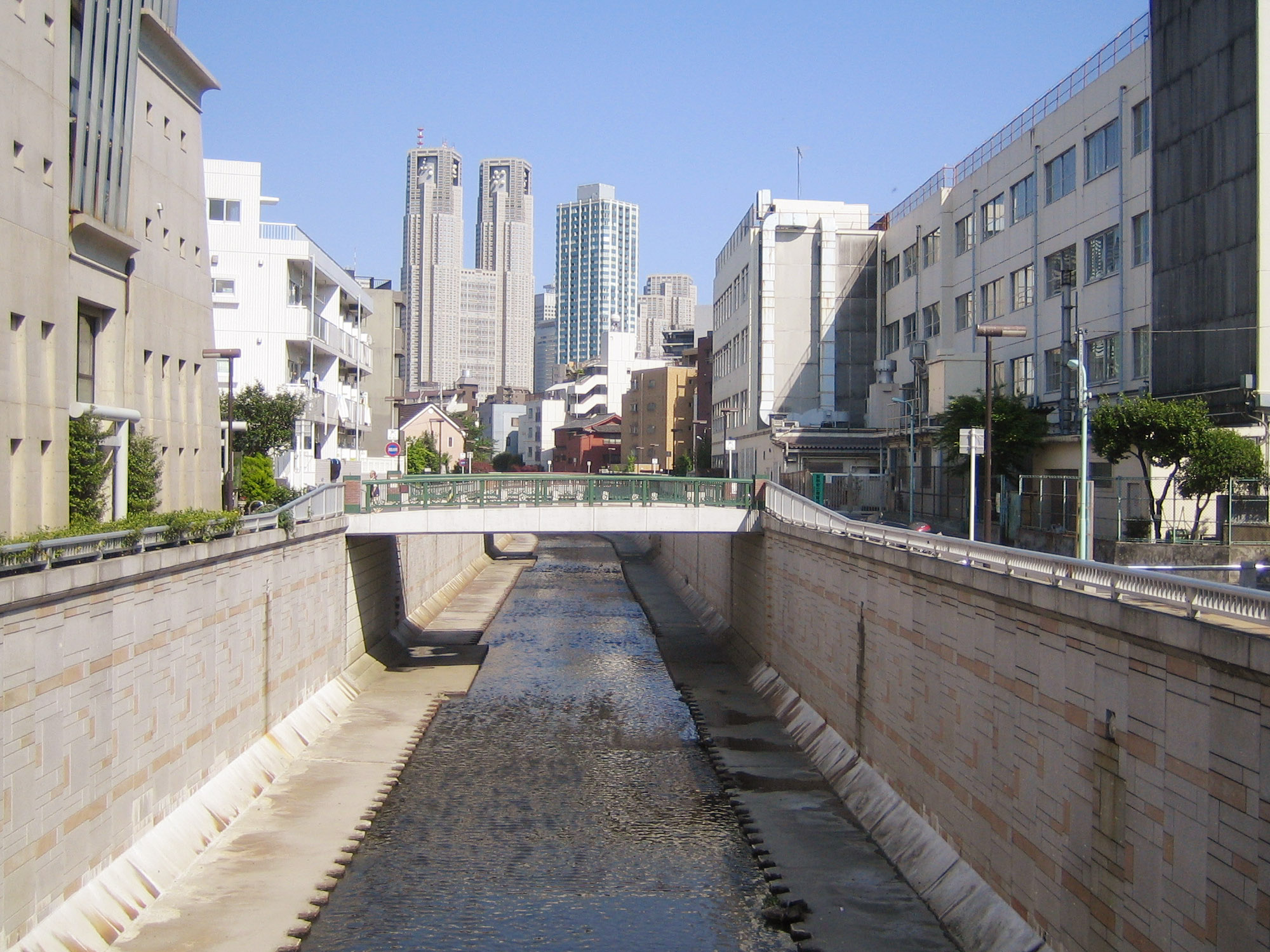
- The Kanda River in Nakano. The Tokyo Metropolitan Government Building is in the background.

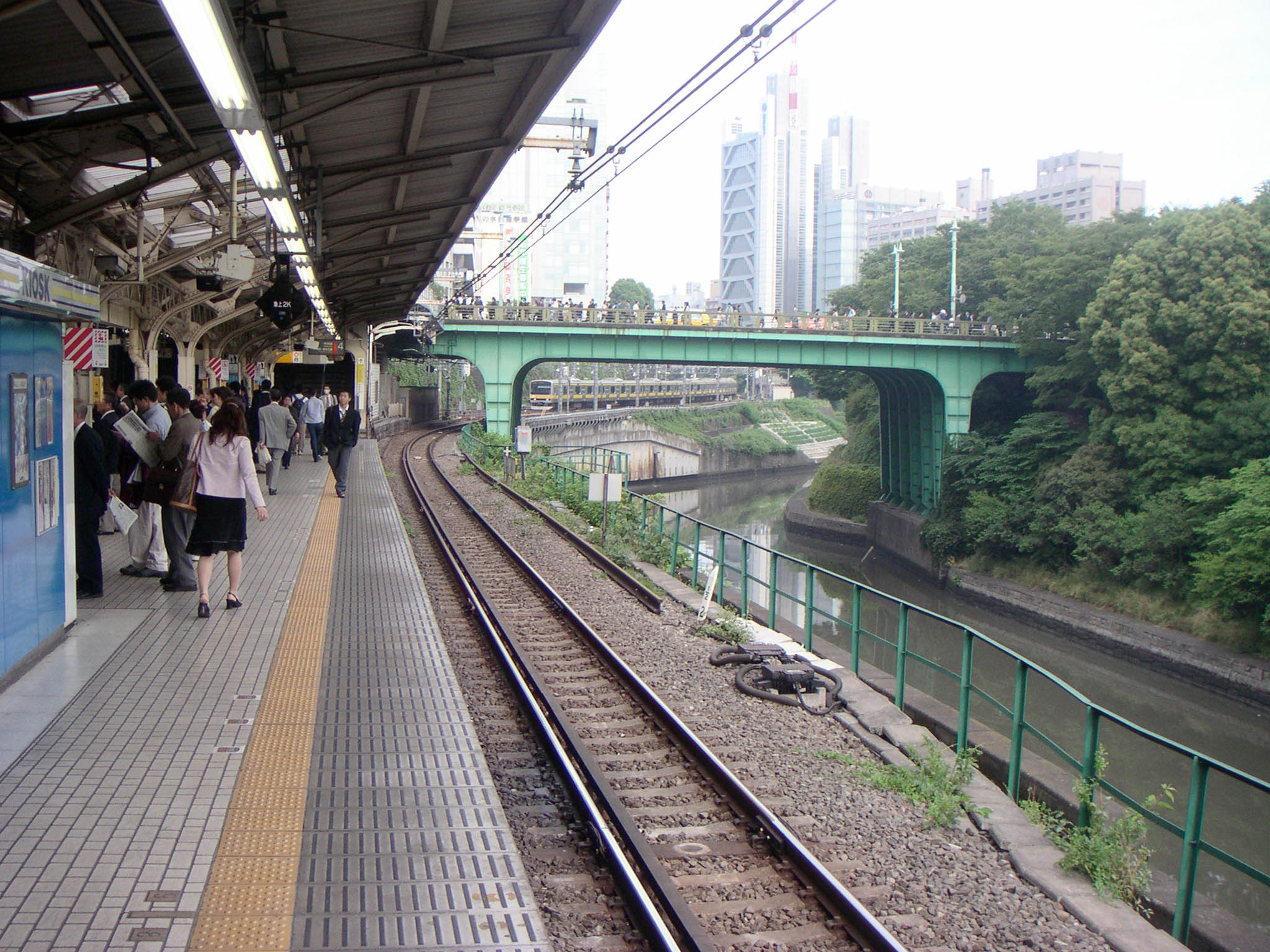
The Kanda River at Ochanomizu Station. The Chūō Line runs along the river.

The Kanda River (神田川, Kandagawa) stretches 24.6 km (15.3 mi) from Inokashira Park in Mitaka to the Sumida River under the Ryōgoku Bridge at the boundary of Taitō, Chūō, and Sumida. Its entire length lies within Tokyo, Japan. It drains an area of 105.0 km^{2} (40.5 sq mi). The government of Japan classifies it as a Class A river.

== Tributaries and branches ==
The Zenpukuji, Momozono, and Myōshō-ji rivers are tributaries of the Kanda. The outer moat of the Imperial Palace is also a tributary. The Nihonbashi River is a distributary of the Kanda.

== History ==
Originally the lower part of the river ran southwards into an inlet of the sea that ran northwards to present-day Hibiya and Kokyo Gaien plaza. During the rule of the shogun Tokugawa Hidetada, the river was diverted to flow into the Sumida River, with the spoil from the diversion used to reclaim the cove at Hibiya.

In the middle section of the length of the river, there is a 2.1 km (1.3 mi) section from the area near Toden Arakawa Line Waseda Station to near Iidabashi Station which was formerly called Edo River (江戸川, Edogawa). The name of this section was changed to Kanda River in August 1970, consistent with the name of the rest of the river. Most other nearby place names nearby deriving from "Edogawa" had disappeared by 1966, but some remain, including Edogawabashi Station, the bridge after which the station was named, and Edogawa Park (江戸川公園, Edogawa kōen) in Bunkyo, Tokyo. Additionally, until the late Meiji period, the banks of the river between Ishikiri bridge (石切橋, Ishikiribashi) and Ryūkei bridge (隆慶橋, Ryūkeibashi) were considered to be one of the best cherry blossom sites in Tokyo.

Construction began in the 1980s of a diversion tunnel which could temporarily store excess water which historically has been a big problem causing flooding to thousands of homes during powerful typhoons or torrential downpours. The Kanda River Underground Diversion Channel is actually one huge tunnel built under major roads. The plan is to construct a 4.5-kilometre-long (2.8 mi) tunnel, 13-metre-wide (43 ft) tunnel 40 metres (130 ft) below street level. The first 2 km (1.2 mi) section was completed in 1997, and it can hold the runoff of 50 mm (2.0 in) of rain falling in one hour. The reservoir has drawn water from the river on more than a dozen occasions since it opened, and the Kanda River has not flooded during that time. Plans call for the tunnel to be extended to Tokyo Bay, literally creating a second, underground Kanda River.

== Notable bridges and locations ==
- Manseibashi
- Hijiribashi

== In popular culture ==
The folk group Kaguyahime released the song Kandagawa in 1973 and sold more than a million copies. Keiko Sekine (Takahashi) and Masao Kusakari starred in a film based on the song.Japanese pianist Nobuyuki Tsujii composed the music Whisper of the River to express his love for his father after the two took a walk along the Kanda River.

The Kanda River is also featured prominently in the multimedia project Kandagawa Jet Girls. It serves as the venue for all of the anime version's Jet Racing and VR training sequences as well as assorted other activities throughout the series.
