= One Day, One Dream =

Single by Tackey & Tsubasa

from the album 2wenty 2wo
- Released: February 11, 2004
- Recorded: ?
- Genre: J-pop
- Length: 21 minutes 49 seconds (Regular CD); 26 minutes 16 seconds (Limited CD)
- Label: Avex Trax
- Songwriter(s): Hideyuki Obata, Batu Bulan, Sumiyo Mutsumi, Hitoshi Haba
- Producer(s): ?

Tackey & Tsubasa singles chronology
| "Yume Monogatari" (2003) | "One Day, One Dream" (2004) | "Serenade" (2004) |

Alternative cover
- The cover to the regular CD version of "One Day, One Dream".

"One Day, One Dream" is Tackey & Tsubasa's third single under the Avex Trax label. This is the third retail single for their 2wenty 2wo album.

== Overview ==
The a-side song "One Day, One Dream" was used as the 5th opening theme song to the anime InuYasha. The b-side "Deep into Blue" was used as the House Commodity "Tongari Corn" commercial song. The other b-side "Arugamama" was TBS TV "Golden Muscle" ending theme song.

Sample of the translated lyrics:

(You can now, dream)
Brandishing a brave dream
(Go in and try)
a forcible try and repeating worries
You move toward the endless days too
(Do you need to cry?)
Do we cry identically? Loneliness too
(Show me, a day, fight)
Fight up front, and every time you cry,
become steady with your dream

== Track listing ==
=== Regular CD Format ===
1. "One Day, One Dream" (Hideyuki Obata, Kei Yoshikawa) - 4:24
2. "Deep into Blue" (Imai Tsubasa) (Batu Bulan, Tetsuhiko Suzuki, Tomoji Sogawa) - 4:22
3. "Arugamama (あるがまま)" (Takizawa Hideaki) (Sumiyo Mutsumi, Masatoshi Sakashita) - 4:20
4. "Ai Sekai (愛世界)" (Hitoshi Haba) - 4:20
5. "One Day, One Dream ~karaoke~" - 4:24

=== Limited CD Format ===
1. "One Day, One Dream" (Hideyuki Obata, Kei Yoshikawa) - 4:24
2. "Deep into Blue" (Imai Tsubasa) (Batu Bulan, Tetsuhiko Suzuki, Tomoji Sogawa) - 4:22
3. "Arugamama (あるがまま)" (Takizawa Hideaki) (Sumiyo Mutsumi, Masatoshi Sakashita) - 4:19
4. "One Day, One Dream: Takizawa Part Version" - 4:24
5. "One Day, One Dream: Tsubasa Part Version" - 4:24
6. "One Day, One Dream: karaoke" - 4:24
7. "Brand New World" - 4:14

== Personnel ==
- Takizawa Hideaki - vocals
- Imai Tsubasa - vocals

== Charts ==
Oricon Sales Chart (Japan)

| Release | Chart | Peak position | Sales total |
|---|---|---|---|
| 11 February 2004 | Oricon Weekly Singles Chart | 1 | 111,000 |

== RIAJ Certification ==
As of March 2004, "One Day, One Dream" has been certified gold for shipments of over 100,000 by the Recording Industry Association of Japan.
