= List of best-selling albums of the 1970s (Japan) =

The following list indicates the best-selling albums from 1970 to 1979 on the Japanese Oricon chart. It is based on cumulative sales figures of two formats (on vinyl, and audio cassette).

== Albums ==
Best-selling albums of the 1970s in Japan
Position	Album	Artist	Record label	Released	Peak position on chart(formats)
1	Kōri no Sekai	Yōsui Inoue	Polydor	December 1973	1 (LP)
2	Samayoi	Kei Ogura	Polydor	March 1972	2 (LP)
3	Alice VI	Alice	Toshiba EMI	April 1978	1 (LP)
4	Eiko e no Dasshutsu	Alice	Toshiba EMI	October 1978	1 (LP/CT)
5	Modorimichi (Inoue Yosui Live)	Yōsui Inoue	Polydor	July 1973	2 (LP)
6	Magic Monkey	Godiego	Nippon Columbia	October 1978	1 (LP)
7	Let It Be	The Beatles	Toshiba EMI	June 1970	2 (LP)
8	Best Hit Album	Pink Lady	Victor	December 1977	1 (LP)
9	Saturday Night Fever	Soundtrack	Polydor	February 1978	1 (LP)
10	10 "Numbers" Carat	Southern All Stars	Victor	April 1979	2 (LP/CT)
11	Nishoku no Koma	Yōsui Inoue	Polydor	October 1974	1 (LP/CT)
12	Yumekuyō	Masashi Sada	Warner/Pioneer	April 1979	1 (LP/CT)
13	Adoro, La Reine de Saba	Graciela Susana	Toshiba EMI	May 1973	7 (LP)
14	Arrival	ABBA	Discomate	May 1977	3 (LP)
15	Alice V	Alice	Toshiba EMI	July 1976	3 (LP)
16	Kaguyahime Forever	Kaguyahime	Nippon Columbia	March 1975	1 (LP)
17	Voulez-Vous	ABBA	Discomate	May 1979	1 (LP)
18	Arukitsuzukeru Toki	Chiharu Matsuyama	Pony/Canyon	October 1978	1 (LP/CT)
19	Kazamidori	Masashi Sada	Warner/Pioneer	July 1977	1 (LP/CT)
20	Anthology	Masashi Sada	Warner/Pioneer	March 1978	1 (LP)
21	1962–1966	The Beatles	Toshiba EMI	May 1973	1 (LP)
22	Abbey Road	The Beatles	Toshiba EMI	October 1969	3 (LP)
23	Kaguyahime Live	Kaguyahime	Nippon Columbia	September 1974	1 (LP)
24	Yuming Brand	Yumi Arai	Alfa	June 1976	1 (LP/CT)
25	Now and Then	Carpenters	King	June 1973	1 (LP)
