= Misora =

Studio album by Sachiko Kanenobu
- Released: September 1, 1972
- Recorded: 1972
- Studio: Aoi Studio 1st and 7th Studios, Hollywood, California
- Genre: Folk
- Length: 41:23
- Label: URC
- Producer: Haruomi Hosono

Sachiko Kanenobu chronology
Misora (1972)	It's Up to You (1995)

Singles from Misora
- 1. "Leave It to Time" Released: July 1971

Misora (Japanese: み空; lit. 'Beautiful Sky') is the debut album of Japanese singer-songwriter Sachiko Kanenobu, released on September 1, 1972 by URC (Underground Record Club) Records.

Joni Mitchell, Donovan and Pentangle were among Kanenobu's influences. The songs have been described as "capturing Kanenobu's distinct youthful innocence, her fascination with nature, and a longing for inner peace." Released in Japan with no concerts to promote it, Misora achieved commercial success in Japan but soon slipped into obscurity. The science fiction author Philip K. Dick, a friend of Kanenobu's fiancée Paul Williams, was impressed by the album, and would later produce a single ("Fork in the Road / Tokyo Song") with Kanenobu.

Misora garnered a cult following in the years since its release, drawing comparisons with the work of Mitchell. It was reissued in 1995 to acclaim, and Light in the Attic Records also reissued the album (as part of the label's Japan Archival Series) on July 19, 2019, with English translations of the lyrics by Kanenobu.

== History ==
Jedd Beaudoin of PopMatters noted in an interview that Kanenobu was "considered the first woman to play guitar and sing folk music in Japan." The singer-songwriter stated, "It was still a man's world in Japan. URC [Underground Record Club] focused on songs with a big message. Anti-war, social statements. But the music was mostly by men. Many of those people are friends of mine but I was there when it started. But women were pushed to the back. I waited and waited."

Other members of the URC stable, including Happy End members Eiichi Ohtaki and Haruomi Hosono, aided in the production of the album.

== Critical reception and legacy ==
Jesse Jarnow billed Misora as "stunning". In 2019, Adriane Pontecorvo of PopMatters gave the album eight out of 10 stars and wrote, "She paints romantic portraits of nature, taps into wells of human emotion, and often ties the two together in beautiful ways." Pontecorvo praised "Falcon and I" as having "catchy verses joined together by slow, psychedelic stretches of hauntingly emotive singing and strumming." The same year, Gabe Meline dubbed Misora a "Japanese folk masterpiece", and said that the album "has an emotional impact that sets it apart" from other 1970s Japanese folk music. She referred to the song "Anata Kara Toku E" as "spellbinding". Mia Doi Todd covered the same song for Songbook (2016).

Jedd Beaudoin reported that Jim O'Rourke and Devendra Banhart have praised "its elegance and simplicity". The writer also stated, "Imaginative, emotional and informed by a singular vision, Misora would not have been an easy album to follow in the immediate". Jonathan Frahm of PopMatters argues that Kanenobu "successfully [explores] a variety of musical avenues throughout the LP. From the light psychedelia of its titular, atmospheric opening number to the slinking, electric blues of "Aoi Sakana" ["Blue Fish"], Misora is an accessible, infectious album from start to finish".

Kanenobu has stated of the album that "in Japan, about every 15 years young people discover it".

== Track listing ==
All lyrics, music and arrangement by Sachiko Kanenobu, except where noted.

=== Side A ===
1. み空/"Misora" – (4:04)
2. あなたから遠くへ/"Far Away from You" – (3:26)
  - Arrangement: Haruomi Hosono
3. かげろう/"The Heat Haze" – (3:00)
4. 時にまかせて（アルバム・バージョン）/"Leave It to Time (Album Version)" – (2:56)
  - Arrangement: Haruomi Hosono
5. 空はふきげん/"Moody Sky" – (2:57)
  - Composer: Eiichi Ohtaki
6. おまえのほしいのは何/"What Do You Really Want" – (2:44)

=== Side B ===
1. 青い魚/"Blue Fish" – (2:58)
  - Arrangement: Haruomi Hosono
2. 雪が降れば（ようこさんにささげる）/"I Wish It Would Snow" – (4:00)
3. 道行き/"Running Away on a Road of Snow" – (2:57)
4. はやぶさと私/"Falcon and I" – (8:00)
5. 春一番の風は激しく/"The First Strong Winds of Spring" – (2:45)
  - Lyrics: Akiko Fujiwara

== See also ==
- 1972 in Japanese music
