= Yume Monogatari =

"Yume Monogatari (夢物語)"

Single by Tackey & Tsubasa

from the album 2wenty 2wo
- Released: November 12, 2003
- Recorded: ?
- Genre: J-pop
- Length: 22 min 06 s (Regular CD); 27 min 37 s (Limited CD)
- Label: Avex Trax
- Songwriters: Hitoshi Haba, Sumiyo Mutsumi, Ooyagi Hiroo, Mizue, Hideyuki Obata
- Producer: ?

Tackey & Tsubasa singles chronology
"To Be, to Be, Ten Made to Be" (2003)	"Yume Monogatari (夢物語)" (2003)	"One Day, One Dream" (2004)

Alternative cover
- The cover to the regular CD version of "Yume Monogatari"

"Yume Monogatari" is Tackey & Tsubasa's second single under the avex trax label. This is the second retail single for their 2wenty 2wo album.

== Overview ==
"Yume Monogatari (夢物語)" is the second single released by Japanese pop duo Tackey & Tsubasa. The a-side song "Yume Monogatari" was used as the Olympus "μDigital" commercial song. The b-side "Kaze no Uta" was used as House Commodity "Dongari Corn" commercial song. The other b-side "It's Only Dream" was TBS TV "Golden Muscle" ending theme song. To add to that, the last b-side, which is "Hitonatsu no..." was used as TBS TV "USO!? Japan" ending theme song.

Sample of the translated lyrics:

You are a flower of love, I am a flower of romance
Seizing time, shaking
A tale of the moon, a tale of the stars, I continued to pray
You are a trap of love, I am a trap of romance; seizing everything, we'll sleep
A tale of the wind, a tale of a dream, an illusion that won't fade

== Track listing ==
=== Regular CD Format ===
1. "Yume Monogatari (夢物語)" (Hitoshi Haba) - 4:31
2. "Kaze no Uta (風の歌)" (Imai Tsubasa) (Sumiyo Mutsumi, UZA) - 4:37
3. "It's Only Dream" (Takizawa Hideaki) (Ooyagi Hiroo, Mizue) - 4:54
4. "Hitonatsu no... (ひと夏の…)" (Hideyuki Obata, Kousuke Morimoto) - 3:32
5. "Yume Monogatari: karaoke" - 4:31

=== Limited CD Format ===
1. "Yume Monogatari (夢物語)" (Hitoshi Haba) - 4:31
2. "Kaze no Uta (風の詩)" (Imai Tsubasa) (Sumiyo Mutsumi, UZA) - 4:37
3. "It's Only Dream" (Takizawa Hideaki) (Ooyagi Hiroo, Mizue) - 4:54
4. "Yume Monogatari: Takizawa Part Version" - 4:31
5. "Yume Monogatari: Tsubasa Part Version" - 4:31
6. "Yume Monogatari: karaoke" - 4:31

== Personnel ==
- Takizawa Hideaki - vocals
- Imai Tsubasa - vocals

== Charts ==
Oricon Sales Chart (Japan)

Release	Chart	Peak position	Sales total	Chart run
12 November 2003	Oricon Daily Singles Chart			
12 November 2003	Oricon Weekly Singles Chart	1	199,000	22 weeks
12 November 2003	Oricon Yearly Singles Chart			

== RIAJ Certification ==
As of December 2003, "Yume Monogatari" has been certified gold for shipments of over 100,000 by the Recording Industry Association of Japan.
