= Graciela Susana =

Argentine singer (1953–2024)

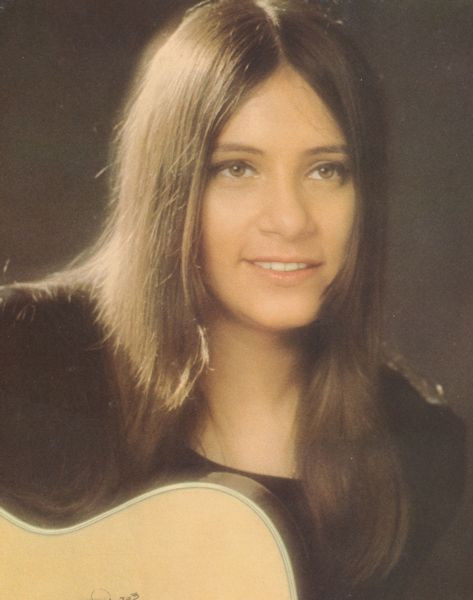

Background information
- Born: 22 January 1953; Buenos Aires, Argentina
- Origin: Argentina
- Died: 19 November 2024 (aged 71)
- Genres: Tango
- Occupation: Singer
- Instrument: Guitar
- Label: Express (Toshiba-EMI)

Graciela Susana Ambrosio (22 January 1953 – 19 November 2024), known as simply Graciela Susana (Japanese: グラシエラ・スサーナ), was an Argentinian tango singer who achieved success in Japan in the 1970s.

== Life and career ==
Graciela Susana was born in Buenos Aires on 22 January 1953. Her father, Ricardo Ernesto Ambrosio, was a musician who sang and played piano in an orchestra, and she grew up immersed in music. When she was a child, she performed as a folk duo with her older sister Cristina. In the late 1960s, she began to sing tango as a soloist, accompanying herself on guitar. Among her teachers were such renowned guitarists as Kelo Palacios and Roberto Lara.

In 1971, at the age of 18, she was discovered by Japanese singer Yōichi Sugawara, who together with his manager was in the audience when she performed at the famous tango bar El Viejo Almacén. She then travelled to Japan where she became a successful recording artist for Toshiba-EMI. Her most commercially successful album is Adoro, La reine de Saba released in 1973. It was a long-lasting hit, staying in the Oricon Top 100 for over 220 weeks and selling over 1 million copies.

After many years in Japan, she returned to Argentina in 2011, and died in Buenos Aires on 19 November 2024, at the age of 71.

== See also ==
- List of best-selling albums of the 1970s (Japan)
