= 1972 in Japanese music =

In 1972 (Shōwa 47), Japanese music was released on records, and there were charts, awards, contests and festivals.

== Awards, contests and festivals ==
The 15th Osaka International Festival (Japanese: 大阪国際フェスティバル) was held from 12 April to 28 April 1972. The 1st Tokyo Music Festival was held on 13 May 1972. The 4th Yamaha Popular Song Contest was held on 8 October 1972. The final of the 3rd World Popular Song Festival was held on 19 November 1972. The 14th Japan Record Awards were held on 31 December 1972. The 23th NHK Kōhaku Uta Gassen was held on 31 December 1972.

The 21st Otaka prize was won by Joji Yuasa.

== Number one singles ==
Oricon

The following reached number 1 on the weekly Oricon Singles Chart:

Issue date	Song	Artist(s)
3 January	"Ame no Midōsuji"	Ouyang Fei Fei
10 January	"Akuma ga Nikui"	Takao Hirata & Sell Stars
17 January	"Akuma ga Nikui"	Takao Hirata & Sell Stars
24 January	"Akuma ga Nikui"	Takao Hirata & Sell Stars
31 January	"Akuma ga Nikui"	Takao Hirata & Sell Stars
7 February	"Akuma ga Nikui"	Takao Hirata & Sell Stars
14 February	"Wakare no Asa"	Pedro & Capricious
21 February	"Wakare no Asa"	Pedro & Capricious
28 February	"Wakare no Asa"	Pedro & Capricious
6 March	"Wakare no Asa"	Pedro & Capricious
13 March	"Chiisana Koi"	Mari Amachi
20 March	"Chiisana Koi"	Mari Amachi
27 March	"Chiisana Koi"	Mari Amachi
3 April	"Chiisana Koi"	Mari Amachi
10 April	"I'd Like to Teach the World to Sing (In Perfect Harmony)"; Japanese title: "Aisuru Harmony" (愛するハーモニー, Aisuru Hāmonī; lit. "Love Harmony")	The New Seekers
17 April	"Yoake no Teishaba"	Shōji Ishibashi
24 April	"Yoake no Teishaba"	Shōji Ishibashi
1 May	"Yoake no Teishaba"	Shōji Ishibashi
8 May	"Taiyō ga Kureta Kisetsu"	Aoi Sankaku Jōgija
15 May	"Seto no Hanayome"	Rumiko Koyanagi
22 May	"Seto no Hanayome"	Rumiko Koyanagi
29 May	"Seto no Hanayome"	Rumiko Koyanagi
5 June	"Seto no Hanayome"	Rumiko Koyanagi
12 June	"Hitori Janai no"	Mari Amachi
19 June	"Hitori Janai no"	Mari Amachi
26 June	"Hitori Janai no"	Mari Amachi
3 July	"Hitori Janai no"	Mari Amachi
10 July	"Hitori Janai no"	Mari Amachi
17 July	"Hitori Janai no"	Mari Amachi
24 July	"Sayonara wo Suru Tame ni"	Billy BanBan
31 July	"Sayonara wo Suru Tame ni"	Billy BanBan
7 August	"Tabi no Yado"	Takuro Yoshida
14 August	"Tabi no Yado"	Takuro Yoshida
21 August	"Tabi no Yado"	Takuro Yoshida
28 August	"Tabi no Yado"	Takuro Yoshida
4 September	"Tabi no Yado"	Takuro Yoshida
11 September	"Kyō no Niwaka Ame"	Rumiko Koyanagi
18 September	"Kyō no Niwaka Ame"	Rumiko Koyanagi
25 September	"Kyō no Niwaka Ame"	Rumiko Koyanagi
2 October	"Niji o Watatte"	Mari Amachi
9 October	"Niji o Watatte"	Mari Amachi
16 October	"Niji o Watatte"	Mari Amachi
23 October	"Niji o Watatte"	Mari Amachi
30 October	"Onna no Michi"	Shiro Miya & Pinkara Trio
6 November	"Onna no Michi"	Shiro Miya & Pinkara Trio
13 November	"Onna no Michi"	Shiro Miya & Pinkara Trio
20 November	"Onna no Michi"	Shiro Miya & Pinkara Trio
27 November	"Onna no Michi"	Shiro Miya & Pinkara Trio
4 December	"Onna no Michi"	Shiro Miya & Pinkara Trio
11 December	"Onna no Michi"	Shiro Miya & Pinkara Trio
18 December	"Onna no Michi"	Shiro Miya & Pinkara Trio
25 December	"Onna no Michi"	Shiro Miya & Pinkara Trio

== Number one albums and LPs ==
Cash Box

The following reached number 1 on the Cash Box LPs chart:

- 29 January: Imagine - John Lennon
- 5 February: Led Zeppelin IV - Led Zeppelin
- 12 February, 19 February, 26 February, 4 March, 11 March, 18 March, 25 March, 1 April, 8 April, 15 April, 22 April, 29 April, 6 May, 13 May and 20 May: Mizuiro No Koi / Namidakara Ashita E (Japanese: 水色の恋/涙から明日へ) - Mari Amachi. The English name of this record is "Love in Blue". Mari Amachi's first album.
- 27 May and 10 June: Paul Simon - Paul Simon
- 17 June: Ningen Nante - Takuro Yoshida
- 24 June: Mardi Gras
- 1 July, 8 July, 15 July, 22 July, 29 July, 5 August, 12 August and 19 August: Chiisana Koi-Hitori Ja Naino (Japanese: ちいさな恋/ひとりじゃないの) - Mari Amachi
- 26 August, 2 September, 9 September, 16 September, 23 September, 30 September, 7 October, 21 October, 28 October, 11 November, 18 November, 25 November, 2 December, 9 December, 16 December and 23 December: Genkidesu - Takuro Yoshida

Oricon

The following reached number 1 on the Oricon LP chart:

- 24 January and 31 January: Simon & Garfunkel No Subete (Japanese: サイモン&ガーファンクルのすべて) - Simon & Garfunkel
- 7 February, 14 February, 21 February, 28 February, 6 March, 13 March, 20 March, 27 March, 3 April, 10 April, 17 April, 29 May and 5 June: Mizuiro No Koi / Namidakara Ashita E (Japanese: 水色の恋/涙から明日へ) - Mari Amachi
- 24 April, 1 May, 8 May, 15 May and 22 May: Paul Simon - Paul Simon
- 12 June: Shoshin Wo Wasuremai To Chikatta Hi (Japanese: 初心を忘れまいと誓った日) - Rumiko Koyanagi
- 19 June, 26 June, 3 July, 10 July, 17 July, 24 July, 31 July and 7 August: Chiisana Koi-Hitori Ja Naino (Japanese: ちいさな恋/ひとりじゃないの) - Mari Amachi
- 14 August, 21 August, 28 August, 4 September, 11 September, 18 September, 25 September, 2 October, 9 October, 16 October, 23 October, 30 October, 6 November, 13 November and 27 November: Genkidesu - Takuro Yoshida
- 20 November and 4 December: Amachi Mari Gift Pack (Japanese: 天地真理ギフトパック) - Mari Amachi
- 11 December, 18 December and 25 December: Gift Pack (Japanese: ギフト・パック) - Simon & Garfunkel

== Annual charts ==
Shiro Miya & Pinkara Trio's Onna no Michi was number 1 in the Oricon annual singles chart. Billy BanBan's Sayonarawo Surutameni was number 1 in the Cash Box annual singles chart.

== Film and television ==
The music of The Long Darkness, by Teizo Matsumura, won the 27th Mainichi Film Award for Best Music.

Best 30 Kayōkyoku was first broadcast in 1972.

== Classical music ==
The Hiroshima Symphony Orchestra and New Japan Philharmonic were founded.

== Music industry ==
More than 20 million tapes and 150 million disks were manufactured. The record sales drive that started on 1 September 1972, was the largest that had ever taken place.

== Other singles released ==
- Mebae by Megumi Asaoka
- 21 January: Kekkon Shiyo Yo by Takuro Yoshida
- 1 August: Otokonoko Onnanoko by Hiromi Go
- 5 September: Kuruwasetaino (Japanese: 狂わせたいの) by Linda Yamamoto
- 10 September: Kassai by Naomi Chiaki
- 21 September: Aishu No Page by Saori Minami

== Other albums released ==
- Made in Japan by Flower Travellin' Band
- Misora by Sachiko Kanenobu
- Musashino Tanpopodan No Densetsu (Japanese: 武蔵野タンポポ団の伝説) by Musashino Tanpopodan

== See also ==
- Timeline of Japanese music
- 1972 in Japan
- 1972 in music
- w:ja:1972年の音楽
