= Hatachi =

Studio album by Tackey & Tsubasa
- Released: September 11, 2002
- Recorded: Avex Studio, Bunkamura Studio, Johnny's Studio, On Air Azabu Studio, Warner Studio
- Genre: J-pop
- Length: 42:50
- Label: avex trax
- Producers: Johnny H. Kitagawa & Jun-ichi "Randy" Tsuchiya

Tackey & Tsubasa chronology
Hatachi (2002)	2wenty 2wo (2004)

Hatachi ("Twenty Years Old") is Tackey & Tsubasa's debut mini-album, released under Avex Trax on September 11, 2002.

== Overview ==
Hatachi is the debut mini-album released by duo singers Tackey & Tsubasa. The title of the album refers to the fact that both boys were twenty years old when the album was released; Hatachi (二十歳) means 20 years old in Japanese, and is the age at which the traditional coming-of-age ceremony takes place. "Ki·Se·Ki" was used as the theme song for the TV drama "Taiyou no Kisetsu". The song "The world will never forget..." is in fact a song dedicated to the September 11 victims.

== Music videos ==
Three music videos were made for the mini-album, and were released on a limited edition of their debut single "To Be, To Be, Ten Made to Be". They include the songs True Heart, Ki・Se・Ki, and Get Down, with each video being connected with one another.

=== Ki·Se·Ki ===
The PV starts out with Tackey holding a pocket watch while sitting in a dark and dreary room. During the chorus, Tackey can be seen in a different room, though just as dreary and dark as the first room, laying on a bed, and gazing at the same pocket watch. During the second verse, the scene changes to Tackey talking and laughing while eating at a table. The scene zooms out to reveal that he's in fact talking to no one. Scenes switch once again to show Tsubasa in a field with trees around him, holding the same pocket watch Tackey had in his hands. Switching back to the room with the bed, Tackey is seen in a small area with water, and it mysteriously begins to rain only in that area. Scenes being to change at a rapid pace, the pocket watch gets dropped in the water, Tackey is seen in the field with Tsubasa behind him, and Tackey starts to throw around the water in the pool while being rained on. Finally, Tackey stands in the pool of water, sunlight filtering from a window dries him off, and he walks out of the room.

== Track listing ==
1. "True Heart" (Gorō Matsui, Magnus Funemyr) – 4:13
2. "Ki·Se·Ki (キ・セ・キ)" (Takizawa Hideaki) (Kenn Kato, Hironari Tatsumi) – 5:28
3. "Get Down" (Imai Tsubasa) (Ayumi Miyazaki) – 4:14
4. "The World Will Never Forget..." (Hideyuki Obata, R. Malmberg, T. Johansson) – 5:27
5. "Negai (願い)" (Takizawa Hideaki) (Hikari) – 5:24
6. "Ikanaide (行カナイデ)" (Imai Tsubasa) (Yukako, Kōji Makaino) – 3:50
7. "Sora no Screen: Rainbow in My Soul (空のスクリーン: Rainbow in My Soul)" (Hideyuki Obata, Kei Haneoka) – 4:26
8. "Epilogue" (Kenji Nishino, Joey Carbone) – 5:11
9. "True Heart: International version" (R. Colgate, Magnus Funemyr) – 4:14

== Personnel ==
- Takizawa Hideaki - vocals
- Imai Tsubasa - vocals

== Production ==
- Art Direction & Design - Atsushi Yamaguchi
- Photograph - Minoru Ogishima
- Styling - Takahiro Miyajima
- Hair & Make up - Meguro
- Art Coordinate - Masahiro Ujie
- Creative Coordinate - Naoki Ueda

== Charts and certifications ==
=== Weekly charts ===
Chart (2002)	Peak position
Japan (Oricon Albums Chart)	2

=== Certifications ===
Region	Certification	Certified units/sales
Japan (RIAJ)	Platinum	200,000^{^}
^{^} Shipments figures based on certification alone.
