= Ho! Summer =

"Ho! Summer (Ho! サマー)"

Single by Tackey & Tsubasa

from the album Two You Four You
- Released: August 9, 2006
- Recorded: ?
- Genre: J-pop
- Length: 21 min 22 s (Regular CD); 16 min 28 s (Limited CD); 16 min 27 s (CD+DVD)
- Label: Avex Trax
- Songwriters: Hitoshi Haneda, Ayumi Miyazaki, Hideyuki Obata, Kinuko Sakuma
- Producer: ?

Tackey & Tsubasa singles chronology
"Venus" (2006)	"Ho! Summer (Ho! サマー)" (2006)	"X (Dame)/Crazy Rainbow" (2007)

"Ho! Summer" is a single by Tackey & Tsubasa. Their seventh single under the Avex Trax label, "Ho! Summer" is their first single to be dedicated to summer. The regular version of the CD came with a bonus track, the limited version came with a special key ring, and the CD+DVD version came with a DVD with choreography for the song "Ho! Summer". The main track was used as the theme song for the drama "Gakincho: Return Kids" from July 31, 2006 to September 29, 2006. The Tsubasa solo song, "Mihatenu Yume", was used as the House Commodity "Dongari Corn" commercial song. The limited edition song, "Michi", was used as the image song for "Kawai Juku".

== Track listing ==
=== Regular CD Format - Jacket C ===
1. "Ho! Summer (Ho! サマー)" (Hitoshi Haneda) - 4:06
2. "Taste me" (Takizawa Hideaki) (Ayumi Miyazaki) - 3:42
3. "Mihatenu Yume (見果てぬ夢) (Faraway Dream)" (Imai Tsubasa) (Hideyuki Obata) - 4:33
4. "Michi (道) (Road)" (Kinuko Sakuma) - 4:54
5. "Ho! サマー: karaoke" (Hitoshi Haneda) - 4:07

=== Limited CD format - Jacket B ===
1. "Ho! Summer (Ho! サマー)" (Hitoshi Haneda) - 4:06
2. "Taste me" (Takizawa Hideaki) (Ayumi Miyazaki) - 3:42
3. "Mihatenu Yume (見果てぬ夢) (Faraway Dream)" (Imai Tsubasa) (Hideyuki Obata) - 4:34
4. "Ho! サマー: karaoke" (Hitoshi Haneda) - 4:05

=== CD+DVD format - Jacket A ===
==== CD portion ====
1. "Ho! Summer (Ho! サマー)" (Hitoshi Haneda) - 4:06
2. "Taste me" (Takizawa Hideaki) (Ayumi Miyazaki) - 3:42
3. "Mihatenu Yume (見果てぬ夢) (Faraway Dream)" (Imai Tsubasa) (Hideyuki Obata) - 4:34
4. "Ho! サマー: karaoke" (Hitoshi Haneda) - 4:05

==== DVD portion ====
1. "Ho! サマー (Choreography Video)"

== Personnel ==
- Takizawa Hideaki - vocals
- Imai Tsubasa - vocals

== TV performances ==
- August 4, 2006 - Music Fighter
- August 7, 2006 - Hey! Hey! Hey!
- August 10, 2006 - Utaban
- August 11, 2006 - Music Station

== Charts ==
Oricon Sales Chart (Japan)

Release	Chart	Peak position	First week sales	Sales total	Chart run
9 August 2006	Oricon Daily Singles Chart	2			
9 August 2006	Oricon Weekly Singles Chart	2	80,592	139,073	7 weeks

== RIAJ certification ==
As of September 2006, "Ho! Summer" has been certified "gold" for shipments of over 100,000 by the Recording Industry Association of Japan.
