= Alice (Japanese band) =

Japanese musical group

Alice (Japanese: アリス) is a Japanese three-man folk rock band formed in 1971 by Shinji Tanimura (1948–2023), Takao Horiuchi, and Toru Yazawa.

Among their biggest hits were "Fuyu no Inazuma" ("Winter Lightning", 1977), "Johnny’s Lullaby", and "Champion".

== Discography ==
=== Studio albums ===
Title	Album details	Charts
Title	Album details	JPN
Alice I	Released: 5 September 1972; Label: Toshiba Musical Industries	—
Alice II	Released: 5 June 1973; Label: Toshiba-EMI	93
Alice III	Released: 25 December 1973; Label: Toshiba-EMI	34
Alice IV	Released: 5 May 1975; Label: Toshiba-EMI	20
Alice V	Released: 5 July 1976; Label: Toshiba-EMI	3
Alice VI	Released: 5 April 1978; Label: Toshiba-EMI	1
Alice VII	Released: 5 June 1979; Label: Toshiba-EMI	1
Alice VIII	Released: 25 August 1980; Label: Polystar	1
Alice IX Muhon	Released: 5 July 1981; Label: Polystar	3
Alice X	Released: 15 December 1987; Label: Polystar	11
Alice XI	Released: 10 April 2013; Label: Alice	17

== See also ==
- List of best-selling albums of the 1970s (Japan)
