= Dame/Crazy Rainbow =

"Dame/Crazy Rainbow (×〜ダメ〜/Crazy Rainbow)"

Single by Tackey & Tsubasa
- Released: April 18, 2007
- Genre: J-pop
- Label: Avex Trax

Tackey & Tsubasa singles chronology
"Ho! Summer" (2006)	"Dame/Crazy Rainbow (×〜ダメ〜/Crazy Rainbow)" (2007)	"Creating Samurai" (2007)

Alternative cover
- The regular cover art of "Dame/Crazy Rainbow"

"Dame/Crazy Rainbow" (×～ダメ～/Crazy Rainbow) is Tackey & Tsubasa's eighth single under the Avex Trax label and is their first single for 2007.

== Overview ==
"Dame/Crazy Rainbow" is Tackey & Tsubasa's eighth single and their first single for 2007. The first a-side song, "Dame", is being used as the commercial theme song for the music service sites "Joy Sound", "dwango.jp", and "nusic.jp". The second a-side song, "Crazy Rainbow", was used as the seventh opening theme song for the anime One Piece.

As with their other singles, "Dame/Crazy Rainbow" was released in three different versions, each version coming with a different cover, along with different limited bonus material. Version A of the CD included a limited edition DVD with music clips of "Dame" and "Crazy Rainbow", and choreography lessons for the song "Dame". The B Version of the single included a limited DVD with the seventh opening theme song of "One Piece", a twelve-page photo booklet, and a One Piece sticker.

== Track listing ==
=== CD+DVD Format - Jacket A ===
==== CD Portion ====
1. "Dame (×～ダメ～)"
2. "Crazy Rainbow"
3. "Sadame (運命 (さだめ))" (Hideaki Takizawa solo)
4. "Edge" (Imai Tsubasa solo)
5. "×～ダメ～ karaoke"

==== DVD Portion ====
1. "×～ダメ～ & Crazy Rainbow Music Clip Special Edition"
2. "×～ダメ～ Choreography Lesson"
3. "×～ダメ～ Choreography Lesson (Tackey Angle)"
4. "×～ダメ～ Choreography Lesson (Tsubasa Angle)"

=== One Piece Collaboration CD+DVD Format - Jacket B ===
==== CD Portion ====
1. "Crazy Rainbow"
2. "Dame (×～ダメ～)"
3. "Sadame (運命 (さだめ))" (Hideaki Takizawa solo)
4. "Edge" (Imai Tsubasa solo)
5. "Crazy Rainbow: karaoke"

==== DVD Portion ====
1. "Crazy Rainbow: One Piece X Tackey & Tsubasa Original Animation Music Clip"
2. "Crazy Rainbow: One Piece No Subtitles Opening

=== Regular CD Format - Jacket C ===
1. "Dame (×～ダメ～)"
2. "Crazy Rainbow"
3. "Sadame (運命 (さだめ))" (Hideaki Takizawa solo)
4. "Edge" (Imai Tsubasa solo)
5. "×～ダメ～ (Tackey Part Version)"
6. "×～ダメ～ (Tsubasa Part Version)"
7. "Crazy Rainbow (Tackey Part Version)"
8. "Crazy Rainbow (Tsubasa Part Version)"

== Personnel ==
- Takizawa Hideaki - vocals
- Imai Tsubasa - vocals

== Charts ==
Oricon Sales Chart (Japan)

Release	Chart	Peak position	First week sales	Sales total
April 18, 2007	Oricon Daily Singles Chart	1		
April 18, 2007	Oricon Weekly Singles Chart	1	65,613	97,279
