= List of Oricon number-one singles of 1974 =

The highest-selling singles in Japan are ranked in the Oricon Singles Chart, which is published by Oricon Style magazine. The data are compiled by Oricon based on each singles' physical sales. This list includes the singles that reached the number one place on that chart in 1974.

== Oricon Weekly Singles Chart ==
Issue date	Song	Artist(s)	Ref.
January 7	"Koi no Dial 6700"	Finger 5	
January 14	"Koi no Dial 6700"	Finger 5	
January 21	"Koi no Dial 6700"	Finger 5	
January 28	"Anata"	Akiko Kosaka	
February 4	"Anata"	Akiko Kosaka	
February 11	"Anata"	Akiko Kosaka	
February 18	"Anata"	Akiko Kosaka	
February 25	"Anata"	Akiko Kosaka	
March 4	"Anata"	Akiko Kosaka	
March 11	"Anata"	Akiko Kosaka	
March 18	"Namida no Misao"	Tonosama Kings	
March 25	"Namida no Misao"	Tonosama Kings	
April 1	"Namida no Misao"	Tonosama Kings	
April 8	"Namida no Misao"	Tonosama Kings	
April 15	"Namida no Misao"	Tonosama Kings	
April 22	"Namida no Misao"	Tonosama Kings	
April 29	"Namida no Misao"	Tonosama Kings	
May 6	"Namida no Misao"	Tonosama Kings	
May 13	"Namida no Misao"	Tonosama Kings	
May 20	"Uso"	Kiyoshi Nakajo	
May 27	"Uso"	Kiyoshi Nakajo	
June 3	"Uso"	Kiyoshi Nakajo	
June 10	"Uso"	Kiyoshi Nakajo	
June 17	"Uso"	Kiyoshi Nakajo	
June 24	"Uso"	Kiyoshi Nakajo	
July 1	"Uso"	Kiyoshi Nakajo	
July 8	"Uso"	Kiyoshi Nakajo	
July 15	"Meoto Kagami"	Tonosama Kings	
July 22	"Meoto Kagami"	Tonosama Kings	
July 29	"Meoto Kagami"	Tonosama Kings	
August 5	"Meoto Kagami"	Tonosama Kings	
August 12	"Tsuioku"	Kenji Sawada	
August 19	"Fureai"	Masatoshi Nakamura	
August 26	"Fureai"	Masatoshi Nakamura	
September 2	"Fureai"	Masatoshi Nakamura	
September 9	"Fureai"	Masatoshi Nakamura	
September 16	"Fureai"	Masatoshi Nakamura	
September 23	"Fureai"	Masatoshi Nakamura	
September 30	"Fureai"	Masatoshi Nakamura	
October 7	"Fureai"	Masatoshi Nakamura	
October 14	"Fureai"	Masatoshi Nakamura	
October 21	"Fureai"	Masatoshi Nakamura	
October 28	"Yoroshiku Aishū"	Hiromi Go	
November 4	"Yoroshiku Aishū"	Hiromi Go	
November 11	"Yoroshiku Aishū"	Hiromi Go	
November 18	"Fuyu no Eki"	Rumiko Koyanagi	
November 25	"Amai Seikatsu"	Goro Noguchi	
December 2	"Amai Seikatsu"	Goro Noguchi	
December 9	"Fuyu no Eki"	Rumiko Koyanagi	
December 16	"Anata ni Ageru"	Mineko Nishikawa	
December 23	"Fuyu no Iro"	Momoe Yamaguchi	
December 30	"Fuyu no Iro"	Momoe Yamaguchi	

== See also ==
- 1974 in Japanese music
