= Kamen/Mirai Kōkai =

"Kamen/Mirai Kōkai (仮面/未来航海)"

Single by Tackey & Tsubasa
- Released: May 4, 2005
- Genre: J-pop
- Length: 22 min 22 s (Regular CD); 18 min 17 s (Limited CD); 23 min 24 s (CD+DVD)
- Label: Avex Trax
- Songwriters: Hideyuki Obata, Kousuke Morimoto, Takeshi

Tackey & Tsubasa singles chronology
"Serenade" (2004)	"Kamen/Mirai Kōkai (仮面/未来航海)" (2005)	"Venus" (2006)

"Kamen/Mirai Kōkai" is Tackey & Tsubasa's fifth single under the Avex Trax label.

== Overview ==
The first a-side song "Kamen" was used as the theme song for the Japanese version of the movie Son of the Mask. The other a-side song "Mirai Kōkai" was used as the ending theme song for the anime One Piece.

Sample of Kamen's translated lyrics:

I'll be a flower of the summer flames
Putting on a golden, golden mask
Taking in the sun straightforwardly
With dazzling eyes, dazzling eyes, and passion that stabs the sky
Someday, I'll be the sky
So that I can bluely, bluely dissolve
If I continue to believe in a new world, in my heart, in my heart
The lies, sadness, and clouds will clear away

== Track listing ==
=== Regular CD Format ===
1. "Kamen (仮面)" (Hideyuki Obata, Mikio Sakai) - 5:06
2. "Mirai Kōkai (未来航海)" (Kousuke Morimoto, Mikiko Tagata) - 4:02
3. "Romantic" (Takeshi, Takashi Iioka) - 4:05
4. "Kamen: karaoke" - 5:06
5. "Mirai Kōkai: karaoke" - 4:03

=== Limited CD Format ===
1. "Kamen (仮面)" (Hideyuki Obata, Mikio Sakai) - 5:06
2. "Mirai Kōkai (未来航海)" (Kousuke Morimoto, Mikiko Tagata) - 4:02
3. "Kamen: karaoke" - 5:06
4. "Mirai Kōkai: karaoke" - 4:03

=== CD+DVD Format ===
==== CD Portion ====
1. "Kamen (仮面)" (Hideyuki Obata, Mikio Sakai) - 5:06
2. "Mirai Kōkai (未来航海)" (Kousuke Morimoto, Mikiko Tagata) - 4:02
3. "Kamen: karaoke" - 5:06
4. "Mirai Kōkai: karaoke" - 4:03

==== DVD Portion ====
1. "Kamen (仮面) Video Clip" - 5:07

== Personnel ==
- Takizawa Hideaki - vocals
- Imai Tsubasa - vocals

== TV performances ==
May 6, 2005 - Music Station

== Charts ==
Oricon Sales Chart (Japan)

Release	Chart	Peak position	Sales total	Chart run
4 May 2005	Oricon Daily Singles Chart	1		
4 May 2005	Oricon Weekly Singles Chart	1	124,000	8 weeks
4 May 2005	Oricon Yearly Singles Chart			

== RIAJ Certification ==
As of June 2005, "Kamen / Mirai Kōkai" has been certified gold for shipments of over 100,000 by the Recording Industry Association of Japan.
