= List of Oricon number-one singles of 2002 =

The following is a list of Oricon number-one singles of 2002.

== Oricon Weekly Singles Chart ==
Issue date	Song	Artist(s)	Ref.
January 7	"Always (A Song For Love)"	J Friends	
January 14	"Kimi ga suki"	Mr. Children	
January 21	"Kimi ga suki"	Mr. Children	
January 28	"Winter Bells"	May Kuraki	
February 4	"Life goes on"	Dragon Ash	
February 11	"Life goes on"	Dragon Ash	
February 18	"a Day in Our Life"	Arashi	
February 25	"Again 2"	Yuzu	
March 4	"Soda! We're ALIVE"	Morning Musume	
March 11	"Way of Difference"	Glay	
March 18	"fantasista"	Dragon Ash	
March 25	"fantasista"	Dragon Ash	
April 1	"Hikari"	Hikaru Utada	
April 8	"Hikari"	Hikaru Utada	
April 15	"Hikari"	Hikaru Utada	
April 22	"Wadatsumi no Ki"	Chitose Hajime	
April 29	"Nice na kokoroiki"	Arashi	
May 6	"Free & Easy"	Ayumi Hamasaki	
May 13	"Kanashimi Blue"	KinKi Kids	
May 20	"Sakura Drops"	Hikaru Utada	
May 27	"Freebird"	SMAP	
June 3	"Another Days"	w-inds	
June 10	"Machi"	Tsuyoshi Domoto	
June 17	"Atsuki kodō no hate"	B'z	
June 24	"Feel your breeze"	V6	
July 1	"Koi no My Rage"	Rag Fair	
July 8	"Tokyo"	Keisuke Kuwata	
July 15	"Tokyo"	Keisuke Kuwata	
July 22	"Any"	Mr. Children	
July 29	"Floatin'"	Chemistry	
August 5	"H"	Ayumi Hamasaki	
August 12	"H"	Ayumi Hamasaki	
August 19	"Nemurenu yoru wa kimi no sei"	MISIA	
August 26	"H"	Ayumi Hamasaki	
September 2	"Because of You"	w-inds	
September 9	"My Grandfather's Clock"	Ken Hirai	
September 16	"My Grandfather's Clock"	Ken Hirai	
September 23	"My Grandfather's Clock"	Ken Hirai	
September 30	"My Grandfather's Clock"	Ken Hirai	
October 7	"Voyage"	Ayumi Hamasaki	
October 14	"Voyage"	Ayumi Hamasaki	
October 21	"Voyage"	Ayumi Hamasaki	
October 28	"PIKA☆NCHI"	Arashi	
November 4	"solitude"	KinKi Kids	
November 11	"Koko ni iruzee!"	Morning Musume	
November 18	"Ring"	Ken Hirai	
November 25	"It Takes Two"	Chemistry	
December 2	"SHALL WE LOVE?"	Gomatto	
December 9	"BLUE BE-BOP"	Rip Slyme	
December 16	"Ding Dong"	Tokio	
December 23	"HERO"	Mr. Children	
December 30	"Love Me All Over"	J Friends	
