= List of Oricon number-one singles of 1976 =

The highest-selling singles in Japan are ranked in the Oricon Singles Chart, which is published by Oricon Style magazine. The data are compiled by Oricon based on each singles' physical sales. This list includes the singles that reached the number one place on that chart in 1976.

== Oricon Weekly Singles Chart ==
Issue date	Song	Artist(s)	Ref.
January 5	"Oyoge! Taiyaki-kun"	Masato Shimon	
January 12	"Oyoge! Taiyaki-kun"	Masato Shimon	
January 19	"Oyoge! Taiyaki-kun"	Masato Shimon	
January 26	"Oyoge! Taiyaki-kun"	Masato Shimon	
February 2	"Oyoge! Taiyaki-kun"	Masato Shimon	
February 9	"Oyoge! Taiyaki-kun"	Masato Shimon	
February 16	"Oyoge! Taiyaki-kun"	Masato Shimon	
February 23	"Oyoge! Taiyaki-kun"	Masato Shimon	
March 1	"Oyoge! Taiyaki-kun"	Masato Shimon	
March 8	"Oyoge! Taiyaki-kun"	Masato Shimon	
March 15	"Oyoge! Taiyaki-kun"	Masato Shimon	
March 22	"Beautiful Sunday"; Japanese title: (ビューティフル・サンデー)	Daniel Boone	
March 29	"Beautiful Sunday"; Japanese title: (ビューティフル・サンデー)	Daniel Boone	
April 5	"Beautiful Sunday"; Japanese title: (ビューティフル・サンデー)	Daniel Boone	
April 12	"Beautiful Sunday"; Japanese title: (ビューティフル・サンデー)	Daniel Boone	
April 19	"Beautiful Sunday"; Japanese title: (ビューティフル・サンデー)	Daniel Boone	
April 26	"Beautiful Sunday"; Japanese title: (ビューティフル・サンデー)	Daniel Boone	
May 3	"Beautiful Sunday"; Japanese title: (ビューティフル・サンデー)	Daniel Boone	
May 10	"Beautiful Sunday"; Japanese title: (ビューティフル・サンデー)	Daniel Boone	
May 17	"Beautiful Sunday"; Japanese title: (ビューティフル・サンデー)	Daniel Boone	
May 24	"Beautiful Sunday"; Japanese title: (ビューティフル・サンデー)	Daniel Boone	
May 31	"Beautiful Sunday"; Japanese title: (ビューティフル・サンデー)	Daniel Boone	
June 7	"Beautiful Sunday"; Japanese title: (ビューティフル・サンデー)	Daniel Boone	
June 14	"Beautiful Sunday"; Japanese title: (ビューティフル・サンデー)	Daniel Boone	
June 21	"Beautiful Sunday"; Japanese title: (ビューティフル・サンデー)	Daniel Boone	
June 28	"Beautiful Sunday"; Japanese title: (ビューティフル・サンデー)	Daniel Boone	
July 5	"Yokosuka Story"	Momoe Yamaguchi	
July 12	"Yokosuka Story"	Momoe Yamaguchi	
July 19	"Yokosuka Story"	Momoe Yamaguchi	
July 26	"Yokosuka Story"	Momoe Yamaguchi	
August 2	"Yokosuka Story"	Momoe Yamaguchi	
August 9	"Yokosuka Story"	Momoe Yamaguchi	
August 16	"Yokosuka Story"	Momoe Yamaguchi	
August 23	"Anata Dake wo"	Teruhiko Aoi	
August 30	"Anata Dake wo"	Teruhiko Aoi	
September 6	"Anata Dake wo"	Teruhiko Aoi	
September 13	"Anata Dake wo"	Teruhiko Aoi	
September 20	"Anata Dake wo"	Teruhiko Aoi	
September 27	"Anata Dake wo"	Teruhiko Aoi	
October 4	"Pearl Color ni Yurete"	Momoe Yamaguchi	
October 11	"Pearl Color ni Yurete"	Momoe Yamaguchi	
October 18	"Pearl Color ni Yurete"	Momoe Yamaguchi	
October 25	"Pearl Color ni Yurete"	Momoe Yamaguchi	
November 1	"Pearl Color ni Yurete"	Momoe Yamaguchi	
November 8	"Ochiba ga Yuki ni"	Akira Fuse	
November 15	"Abayo"	Naoko Ken	
November 22	"Abayo"	Naoko Ken	
November 29	"Abayo"	Naoko Ken	
December 6	"Kita no Yadokara"	Harumi Miyako	
December 13	"Abayo"	Naoko Ken	
December 20	"Kita no Yadokara"	Harumi Miyako	
December 27	"Kita no Yadokara"	Harumi Miyako	

== See also ==
- 1976 in Japanese music
