= Takao Horiuchi =

Japanese pop and enka singer (born 1949)

- Born: 堀内孝雄; October 27, 1949; Abeno-ku, Osaka, Japan
- Genres: folk rock, enka
- Formerly of: Alice

Takao Horiuchi (堀内孝雄, Horiuchi Takao; born October 27, 1949 in Abeno-ku, Osaka) is a Japanese pop and enka singer. He won a 1990 Japan Record Award for enka.

== Discography ==
- Your Eyes Are 10,000 Volts (1978)
- Precious Days (1986)
- Angels of the City (1992) - with Kei un-suk
