= List of Oricon number-one singles of 1975 =

The highest-selling singles in Japan are ranked in the Oricon Singles Chart, which is published by Oricon Style magazine. The data are compiled by Oricon based on each single's physical sales. This list includes the singles that reached the number one place on that chart in 1975.

== Oricon Weekly Singles Chart ==
Issue date	Song	Artist(s)	Ref.
January 6	"Fuyu no Iro"	Momoe Yamaguchi	
January 13	"Fuyu no Iro"	Momoe Yamaguchi	
January 20	"Fuyu no Iro"	Momoe Yamaguchi	
January 27	"Fuyu no Iro"	Momoe Yamaguchi	
February 3	"Hajimete no Dekigoto"	Junko Sakurada	
February 10	"Shitetsu Ensen"	Goro Noguchi	
February 17	"Shitetsu Ensen"	Goro Noguchi	
February 24	"Shitetsu Ensen"	Goro Noguchi	
March 3	"22-sai no Wakare"	Kaze	
March 10	"22-sai no Wakare"	Kaze	
March 17	"22-sai no Wakare"	Kaze	
March 24	"22-sai no Wakare"	Kaze	
March 31	"Waga Yoki Tomoyo"	Hiroshi Kamayatsu	
April 7	"Waga Yoki Tomoyo"	Hiroshi Kamayatsu	
April 14	"Waga Yoki Tomoyo"	Hiroshi Kamayatsu	
April 21	"Waga Yoki Tomoyo"	Hiroshi Kamayatsu	
April 28	"Showa Kare Susuki"	Sakura & Ichiro	
May 5	"Showa Kare Susuki"	Sakura & Ichiro	
May 12	"Showa Kare Susuki"	Sakura & Ichiro	
May 19	"Cyclamen no Kaori"	Akira Fuse	
May 26	"Cyclamen no Kaori"	Akira Fuse	
June 2	"Cyclamen no Kaori"	Akira Fuse	
June 9	"Cyclamen no Kaori"	Akira Fuse	
June 16	"Cyclamen no Kaori"	Akira Fuse	
June 23	"Kakkoman Boogie / Minato no Yoko Yokohama Yokosuka"	Down Town Boogie Woogie Band	
June 30	"Kakkoman Boogie / Minato no Yoko Yokohama Yokosuka"	Down Town Boogie Woogie Band	
July 7	"Kakkoman Boogie / Minato no Yoko Yokohama Yokosuka"	Down Town Boogie Woogie Band	
July 14	"Kakkoman Boogie / Minato no Yoko Yokohama Yokosuka"	Down Town Boogie Woogie Band	
July 21	"Kakkoman Boogie / Minato no Yoko Yokohama Yokosuka"	Down Town Boogie Woogie Band	
July 28	"Kokoro Nokori"	Takashi Hosokawa	
August 4	"Kokoro Nokori"	Takashi Hosokawa	
August 11	"Kokoro Nokori"	Takashi Hosokawa	
August 18	"Kokoro Nokori"	Takashi Hosokawa	
August 25	"Omoide Makura"	Kyoko Kosaka	
September 1	"Romance"	Hiromi Iwasaki	
September 8	"Romance"	Hiromi Iwasaki	
September 15	"Romance"	Hiromi Iwasaki	
September 22	"Toki no Sugiyuku Mama ni"	Kenji Sawada	
September 29	"Toki no Sugiyuku Mama ni"	Kenji Sawada	
October 6	"Toki no Sugiyuku Mama ni"	Kenji Sawada	
October 13	"Toki no Sugiyuku Mama ni"	Kenji Sawada	
October 20	"Toki no Sugiyuku Mama ni"	Kenji Sawada	
October 27	"Ichigo Hakusho wo Mou Ichido"	Bang Bang	
November 3	"Ichigo Hakusho wo Mou Ichido"	Bang Bang	
November 10	"Ichigo Hakusho wo Mou Ichido"	Bang Bang	
November 17	"Ichigo Hakusho wo Mou Ichido"	Bang Bang	
November 24	"Ichigo Hakusho wo Mou Ichido"	Bang Bang	
December 1	"Ichigo Hakusho wo Mou Ichido"	Bang Bang	
December 8	"Sentimental"	Hiromi Iwasaki	
December 15	"Sentimental"	Hiromi Iwasaki	
December 22	"Ano Hi ni Kaeritai"	Yumi Arai	
December 29	"Ano Hi ni Kaeritai"	Yumi Arai	

== See also ==
- 1975 in Japanese music
