= Kandagawa (song) =

The folk group Kaguyahime released the song Kandagawa (神田川) on September 20, 1973, named after the Kanda River (Kandagawa). With lyrics by Makoto Kitajō and music by Kōsetsu Minami, the single was a remix of a tune released the previous July on the album Kaguyahime Third. It was arranged by Takasuke Kida. Minami sang the lead vocal. Masahiro Takegawa played violin on the single. The lyrics reminisce over the bittersweet experiences of living with a girlfriend in a small room during Kitajō's college days. With sales of 1.6 million copies, it held the top spot on the Oricon charts for seven weeks (including six in a row) and was Kaguyahime's greatest hit.

In 1974, Keiko Sekine (Takahashi) and Masao Kusakari starred in a film based on the song.

== See also ==
- 1973 in Japanese music
