= List of Oricon number-one singles of 1977 =

The highest-selling singles in Japan are ranked in the Oricon Singles Chart, which is published by Oricon Style magazine. The data are compiled by Oricon based on each singles' physical sales. This list includes the singles that reached the number one place on that chart in 1977.

== Oricon Weekly Singles Chart ==
Issue date	Song	Artist(s)	Ref.
January 3	"Kita no Yadokara"	Harumi Miyako	
January 10	"Kita no Yadokara"	Harumi Miyako	
January 17	"Seishun Jidai"	Koichi Morita & Top Gallants	
January 24	"Seishun Jidai"	Koichi Morita & Top Gallants	
January 31	"Seishun Jidai"	Koichi Morita & Top Gallants	
February 7	"Seishun Jidai"	Koichi Morita & Top Gallants	
February 14	"S.O.S."	Pink Lady	
February 21	"Shitsuren Restaurant"	Kentaro Shimizu	
February 28	"Shitsuren Restaurant"	Kentaro Shimizu	
March 7	"Shitsuren Restaurant"	Kentaro Shimizu	
March 14	"Shitsuren Restaurant"	Kentaro Shimizu	
March 21	"Shitsuren Restaurant"	Kentaro Shimizu	
March 28	"Carmen '77"	Pink Lady	
April 4	"Carmen '77"	Pink Lady	
April 11	"Carmen '77"	Pink Lady	
April 18	"Carmen '77"	Pink Lady	
April 25	"Carmen '77"	Pink Lady	
May 2	"Kaeranai / Koibitoyo"	Kentaro Shimizu	
May 9	"Kaeranai / Koibitoyo"	Kentaro Shimizu	
May 16	"Yumesaki Annainin"	Momoe Yamaguchi	
May 23	"Amayadori"	Masashi Sada	
May 30	"Amayadori"	Masashi Sada	
June 6	"Amayadori"	Masashi Sada	
June 13	"Amayadori"	Masashi Sada	
June 20	"Katte ni Shiyagare"	Kenji Sawada	
June 27	"Nagisa no Sindbad"	Pink Lady	
July 4	"Nagisa no Sindbad"	Pink Lady	
July 11	"Nagisa no Sindbad"	Pink Lady	
July 18	"Katte ni Shiyagare"	Kenji Sawada	
July 25	"Katte ni Shiyagare"	Kenji Sawada	
August 1	"Katte ni Shiyagare"	Kenji Sawada	
August 8	"Katte ni Shiyagare"	Kenji Sawada	
August 15	"Nagisa no Sindbad"	Pink Lady	
August 22	"Nagisa no Sindbad"	Pink Lady	
August 29	"Nagisa no Sindbad"	Pink Lady	
September 5	"Nagisa no Sindbad"	Pink Lady	
September 12	"Nagisa no Sindbad"	Pink Lady	
September 19	"Wanted (Shimei Tehai)"	Pink Lady	
September 26	"Wanted (Shimei Tehai)"	Pink Lady	
October 3	"Wanted (Shimei Tehai)"	Pink Lady	
October 10	"Wanted (Shimei Tehai)"	Pink Lady	
October 17	"Wanted (Shimei Tehai)"	Pink Lady	
October 24	"Wanted (Shimei Tehai)"	Pink Lady	
October 31	"Wanted (Shimei Tehai)"	Pink Lady	
November 7	"Wanted (Shimei Tehai)"	Pink Lady	
November 14	"Wanted (Shimei Tehai)"	Pink Lady	
November 21	"Wanted (Shimei Tehai)"	Pink Lady	
November 28	"Wanted (Shimei Tehai)"	Pink Lady	
December 5	"Wanted (Shimei Tehai)"	Pink Lady	
December 12	"Wakareuta"	Miyuki Nakajima	
December 19	"UFO"	Pink Lady	
December 26	"UFO"	Pink Lady	

== See also ==
- 1977 in Japanese music
