= List of Oricon number-one singles of 1981 =

The highest-selling singles in Japan are ranked in the Oricon Singles Chart, which is published by Oricon Style magazine. The data are compiled by Oricon based on each singles' physical sales. This list includes the singles that reached the number one place on that chart in 1981.

== Oricon Weekly Singles Chart ==
Issue date	Song	Artist(s)	Ref.
January 5	"Sneaker Blues"	Masahiko Kondō	
January 12	"Sneaker Blues"	Masahiko Kondō	
January 19	"Sneaker Blues"	Masahiko Kondō	
January 26	"Koi wa Do!"	Toshihiko Tahara	
February 2	"Koi wa Do!"	Toshihiko Tahara	
February 9	"Cherry Blossom"	Seiko Matsuda	
February 16	"Cherry Blossom"	Seiko Matsuda	
February 23	"Cherry Blossom"	Seiko Matsuda	
March 2	"Cherry Blossom"	Seiko Matsuda	
March 9	"Machikado Twilight"	Chanels	
March 16	"Machikado Twilight"	Chanels	
March 23	"Machikado Twilight"	Chanels	
March 30	"Ruby no Yubiwa"	Akira Terao	
April 6	"Ruby no Yubiwa"	Akira Terao	
April 13	"Ruby no Yubiwa"	Akira Terao	
April 20	"Ruby no Yubiwa"	Akira Terao	
April 27	"Ruby no Yubiwa"	Akira Terao	
May 4	"Ruby no Yubiwa"	Akira Terao	
May 11	"Ruby no Yubiwa"	Akira Terao	
May 18	"Ruby no Yubiwa"	Akira Terao	
May 25	"Ruby no Yubiwa"	Akira Terao	
June 1	"Ruby no Yubiwa"	Akira Terao	
June 8	"Natsu no Tobira"	Seiko Matsuda	
June 15	"Natsu no Tobira"	Seiko Matsuda	
June 22	"Blue Jeans Memory"	Masahiko Kondō	
June 29	"Blue Jeans Memory"	Masahiko Kondō	
July 6	"Blue Jeans Memory"	Masahiko Kondō	
July 13	"Nagai Yoru"	Chiharu Matsuyama	
July 20	"Nagai Yoru"	Chiharu Matsuyama	
July 27	"Nagai Yoru"	Chiharu Matsuyama	
August 3	"Shiroi Parasol"	Seiko Matsuda	
August 10	"Shiroi Parasol"	Seiko Matsuda	
August 17	"Shiroi Parasol"	Seiko Matsuda	
August 24	"High School Lullaby"	Imo-kin Trio	
August 31	"High School Lullaby"	Imo-kin Trio	
September 7	"High School Lullaby"	Imo-kin Trio	
September 14	"High School Lullaby"	Imo-kin Trio	
September 21	"High School Lullaby"	Imo-kin Trio	
September 28	"High School Lullaby"	Imo-kin Trio	
October 5	"High School Lullaby"	Imo-kin Trio	
October 12	"Gingiragin ni Sarigenaku"	Masahiko Kondō	
October 19	"Gingiragin ni Sarigenaku"	Masahiko Kondō	
October 26	"Kaze Tachinu"	Seiko Matsuda	
November 2	"Gingiragin ni Sarigenaku"	Masahiko Kondō	
November 9	"Gingiragin ni Sarigenaku"	Masahiko Kondō	
November 16	"Gingiragin ni Sarigenaku"	Masahiko Kondō	
November 23	"Gingiragin ni Sarigenaku"	Masahiko Kondō	
November 30	"Akujo"	Miyuki Nakajima	
December 7	"Akujo"	Miyuki Nakajima	
December 14	"Akujo"	Miyuki Nakajima	
December 21	"Sailor Fuku to Kikanjū"	Hiroko Yakushimaru	
December 28	"Sailor Fuku to Kikanjū"	Hiroko Yakushimaru	

== See also ==
- 1981 in Japanese music
