= List of Oricon number-one singles of 1999 =

The following is a list of Oricon number-one singles of 1999.

== Oricon Weekly Singles Chart ==
Issue date	Song	Artist(s)	Ref.
January 4	"Toku made"	Kōshi Inaba	
January 11	"I Have Never Seen"	Namie Amuro	
January 18	"Last Chance "	Something Else	
January 25	"Hikari no sasu ho e"	Mr. Children	
February 1	"Asa ga mata kuru"	Dreams Come True	
February 8	"Sono Speed de"	The Brilliant Green	
February 15	"Winter, Again"	Glay	
February 22	"Winter, Again"	Glay	
March 1	"Movin' On Without You"	Hikaru Utada	
March 8	"Yamenai de, Pure"	KinKi Kids	
March 15	"Dango 3 Kyodai"	Kentarō Hayami & Ayumi Shigemori	
March 22	"Dango 3 Kyodai"	Kentarō Hayami & Ayumi Shigemori	
March 29	"Dango 3 Kyodai"	Kentarō Hayami & Ayumi Shigemori	
April 5	"My First Love"	Takako Uehara	
April 12	"Believe Your Smile"	V6	
April 19	"Mind Games"	Zard	
April 26	"Love (Destiny)"	Ayumi Hamasaki	
May 3	"Heaven's Drive"	L'Arc-en-Ciel	
May 10	"Heaven's Drive"	L'Arc-en-Ciel	
May 17	"Grateful Days"	Dragon Ash	
May 24	"I'll Be"	Mr. Children	
May 31	"Survival"	Glay	
June 7	"Flower"	KinKi Kids	
June 14	"Pieces"	L'Arc-en-Ciel	
June 21	"Giri giri chop"	B'z	
June 28	"Energy Flow (Ura BTTB)"	Ryūichi Sakamoto	
July 5	"Energy Flow (Ura BTTB)"	Ryūichi Sakamoto	
July 12	"Energy Flow (Ura BTTB)"	Ryūichi Sakamoto	
July 19	"Energy Flow (Ura BTTB)"	Ryūichi Sakamoto	
July 26	"Be Together"	Ami Suzuki	
August 2	"Boys & Girls"	Ayumi Hamasaki	
August 9	"Boys & Girls"	Ayumi Hamasaki	
August 16	"Boys & Girls"	Ayumi Hamasaki	
August 23	"A"	Ayumi Hamasaki	
August 30	"A"	Ayumi Hamasaki	
September 6	"Koko dewa nai, dokoka e"	Glay	
September 13	"A"	Ayumi Hamasaki	
September 20	"Love Machine"	Morning Musume	
September 27	"Love Machine"	Morning Musume	
October 4	"Love Machine"	Morning Musume	
October 11	"Our Days"	Ami Suzuki	
October 18	"Ame no Melody"	KinKi Kids	
October 25	"Ame no Melody"	KinKi Kids	
November 1	"Subete e"	19	
November 8	"Love Flies"	L'Arc-en-Ciel	
November 15	"A・ra・shi"	Arashi	
November 22	"Addicted to You"	Hikaru Utada	
November 29	"Addicted to You"	Hikaru Utada	
December 6	"Chocotto Love"	Pettite Moni	
December 13	"Chocotto Love"	Pettite Moni	
December 20	"kanariya"	Ayumi Hamasaki	
December 27	"Heaven"	Masaharu Fukuyama	
