= Serenade (Tackey & Tsubasa song) =

"Serenade (愛想曲 (セレナーデ))"

Single by Tackey & Tsubasa
- Released: November 3, 2004
- Recorded: ?
- Genre: J-pop
- Length: 23 min 58 s (Regular CD); 29 min 54 s (Limited CD)
- Label: Avex Trax
- Songwriters: Hitoshi Haba, Mikiko Tagata, Hideyuki Obata
- Producer: ?

Tackey & Tsubasa singles chronology
"One Day, One Dream" (2004)	"Serenade (愛想曲 (セレナーデ))" (2004)	"Kamen/Mirai Koukai" (2005)

"Serenade" is Tackey & Tsubasa's fourth single under the Avex Trax label.

== Overview ==
Serenade is Tackey & Tsubasa's fourth single, and currently their lowest selling and lowest ranking single. The a-side song "Serenade" was used as the Olympus "μDigital" commercial song. The other song "Starry Sky" is Tackey & Tsubasa's first Christmas themed song.

Sample of the translated lyrics:

Don't cry...serenade
In the sky that has begun to shine, is a red melody
Riding on a promise of love
Shine...serenade
Fireworks dance with music
With a kiss for you, it will never die
Only you..., those days...
With a surreal love, in reality
Serenade

== Track listing ==
=== Regular CD Format ===
1. "Serenade (愛想曲 (セレナーデ))" (Hitoshi Haba) - 4:58
2. "Starry Sky" (Mikiko Tagata, Junkoo) - 5:01
3. "Queen of R" (Hideyuki Obata, Ayumi Miyazaki) - 3:59
4. "Serenade: karaoke" - 4:59
5. "Starry Sky: karaoke" - 5:01

=== Limited CD Format ===
1. "Serenade (愛想曲 (セレナーデ))" (Hitoshi Haba) - 4:58
2. "Starry Sky" (Mikiko Tagata, Junkoo) - 5:01
3. "Serenade: Takizawa Part Version" - 4:58
4. "Serenade: Tsubasa Part Version" - 4:58
5. "Serenade: karaoke" - 4:59
6. "Starry Sky: karaoke" - 5:01

== Personnel ==
- Takizawa Hideaki - vocals
- Imai Tsubasa - vocals

== TV performances ==
?, 2004 - Music Station

== Charts ==
Oricon Sales Chart (Japan)

Release	Chart	Peak position	Sales total	Chart run
3 November 2004	Oricon Daily Singles Chart			
3 November 2004	Oricon Weekly Singles Chart	3	91,000	11 weeks
3 November 2004	Oricon Yearly Singles Chart			

== RIAJ Certification ==
As of December 2004, "Serenade" has been certified gold for shipments of over 100,000 by the Recording Industry Association of Japan.
