= List of Oricon number-one singles of 1967 =

The highest-selling singles in Japan are ranked in the Oricon Singles Chart, which is published by Oricon Style magazine. The data are compiled by Oricon based on each singles' physical sales. This list includes the singles that reached the number one place on that chart in 1967.

== Oricon Weekly Singles Chart ==
Issue date	Song	Artist(s)	Ref.
November 2	"Kitaguni no Futari (In a Lonesome City)"	Jackey Yoshikawa and His Blue Comets	
November 9	"Kitaguni no Futari (In a Lonesome City)"	Jackey Yoshikawa and His Blue Comets	
November 16	"Love You Tokyo"	Los Primos	
November 23	"Love You Tokyo"	Los Primos	
November 30	"Love You Tokyo"	Los Primos	
December 7	"Love You Tokyo"	Los Primos	
December 14	"Love You Tokyo"	Los Primos	
December 21	"Love You Tokyo"	Los Primos	
December 28	"Love You Tokyo"	Los Primos	
