= Onna no Michi =

Single by Shiro Miya & Pinkara Trio

from the album Onna no Michi
- B-side: "Okinawa no Hito"
- Released: May 10, 1972
- Genre: Enka
- Length: 4:33
- Label: Nippon Columbia
- Songwriters: Shiro Miya (lyric); Hiroshi Namiki (music)

Shiro Miya & Pinkara Trio singles chronology
"Onna no Michi" (1972)	"Onna no Negai" (1972)

"Onna no Michi" (女のみち; lit. "The Way of a Woman") is the debut single by Shiro Miya & Pinkara Trio released on May 10, 1972, in Japan. The lyrics are simple, but sad. The song is written about a woman who devoted herself to her only man but was deserted by him and was crying. The single became a mega-hit song and had been recognized as the best-selling song in Japan until "Oyoge! Taiyaki-kun" was released.

The song holds an all-time consecutive number-one record to spend 16 consecutive weeks at the number-one position on the Oricon single charts. In Japan, it was the best selling single in 1972 with over 1.3 million copies and held the rank in the next year with over 1.8 million copies. The song was charted for 84 weeks on the Oricon charts. In total it sold over 3.25 million copies and is the second best selling single in Japan according to the Oricon. It is also the best selling enka.

Their album Onna no Michi also reached at the number-one position on the Oricon charts.

== See also ==
- 1972 in Japanese music
