= Tackey & Tsubasa =

Japanese musical duo

Tackey & Tsubasa タッキー&翼
- Origin: Japan
- Genres: J-pop
- Years active: 2002–2018
- Label: Avex Trax
- Past members: Hideaki Takizawa; Tsubasa Imai
- Website: www.avexnet.or.jp/tackeytsubasa

Tackey & Tsubasa (タッキー&翼) were a Japanese idol duo consisting of Hideaki Takizawa and Tsubasa Imai from the Japanese talent agency Johnny & Associates. Takizawa, nicknamed "Tackey" (sometimes spelled as its literal romanization, "Takki" (タッキ)), is best known for his drama works, and Tsubasa for his dancing ability. They have also been musically successful with hit singles such as "Venus" and "Yume Monogatari". Their works are produced by Avex Trax.

== Career ==
=== Pre-debut ===
Before their debut, Tackey and Tsubasa were the top "Juniors" in the Johnny & Associates, a company which specializes in male teen idols led by Johnny Kitagawa. They started out as backdancers for better known teen idols in their label such as KinKi Kids (who also had not yet debuted at the time) in 1995, when both were 13 years old. They have hosted the Japanese variety shows, Gakibara Teikoku 2000 and Music Enta. Besides hosting, the two have starred together in dramas such as Kaiki Club Ghost Stories and Genroku Ryoran. Initially, both of them did not get along well but during the filming of the NHK series Genroku Ryoran, which aired in 1999, they became best friends.

Before their official debut, the two performed together many times. In 1999, Tackey asked Tsubasa to join him in their first duet during the "Johnny's Juniors First Concert" in Tokyo, Japan. In April 2000, at the "Johnny's Juniors Spring 2002 Concert", the two performed their second duet together on stage. For this duet, the two designed their outfits, choreography and even their unit symbol (a tarantula). It was after this time that they hosted the two variety shows, Gakibara Teikoku 2000 and Music Enta, from 2000 to the beginning of 2001.

In February 2001, it was announced that the two would be headlining their first tour, called "Takki and Tsubasa 21st-century Showdown with all Johnny's Juniors". Tsubasa designed the costumes and Tackey designed the setting for this very successful tour, and for the first time in JE history, two Johnnys were distinguished in the title of a Junior tour. This led to many people believing that the two would debut as a duo like the KinKi Kids. Instead, at the end of this tour, Johnny Kitagawa announced the two would debut as solo artists in 2002. They were planned to officially debut when they reached 20-years-old due to their popularity.

For the 2002 "Johnny's Junior concert" the two were again announced to be the headliners of the tour, and it was during this tour that Tackey mentioned he wanted to debut as a duo with Tsubasa. Tackey asked his fans to organize a letter campaign to Johnny & Associates to let them debut as a duo. The fans then launched a campaign asking people who wanted them to debut together to send postcards and letters to Johnny & Associates, imploring Kitagawa to debut the two boys as a duo instead of as solo artists. The campaign has lasted for about a year, but then on August 1, 2002, Johnny announced that they would debut solo. Their debut solo songs would be entitled "Get Down" (Tsubasa's) and "Kiseki" (Tackey's). Yet, as a surprise instead, where the official announcement of their debut was to take place, the two announced they would be debuting as a duet after all. The two solo songs of theirs along with the duet song "True Heart" were the first releases from their debut mini-album, Hatachi (meaning 20-years-old in Japanese), which was released on September 11, 2002.

=== Post-debut ===
To date, Tackey & Tsubasa have released 10 singles, 3 albums and 3 DVDs: a significantly smaller number compared to their counterparts in the company. Their most recent CD releases have reached the top position on the Japanese music charts. The two also share a very close friendship.

The Japanese theme song to Son of the Mask is "Mask" by them. Their songs "Crazy Rainbow" and "Mirai Koukai" were one of the opening and ending theme songs respectively for popular Japanese anime One Piece. They were also featured in the opening animation of One Piece episode 303, added into the opening segment to their song that was used since episode 284. Also, their song "One Day, One Dream" was on the soundtrack of the Japanese anime Inuyasha.

=== Hiatus and break-up ===
On 3 September 2017, shortly before their 15th anniversary, the duo announced a hiatus. The hiatus began on 17 September, after they performed on Music Station Ultra Fes 2017. Tackey & Tsubasa disbanded on 10 September 2018.

== Discography ==
In several cases, the English and romaji titles are given first, followed by the Japanese titles underneath.

=== Singles ===
#	Information	Sales
1st / Debut; Single	To Be, to Be, Ten Made to Be: Released: February 26, 2003; Format: CD5"; Oricon Top 200 Weekly Peak: #3	107,298 copies sold GOLD
2nd	Yume Monogatari 夢物語: Released: November 12, 2003; Format: CD5"; Oricon Top 200 Weekly Peak: #1	199,015 copies sold GOLD
3rd	One Day, One Dream: Released: February 11, 2004; Format: CD5"; Oricon Top 200 Weekly Peak: #1	110,679 copies sold GOLD
4th	Serenade 愛想曲 (セレナーデ): Released: November 3, 2004; Format: CD5"; Oricon Top 200 Weekly Peak: #3	100,000 copies sold GOLD
5th	Kamen/Mirai Koukai 仮面/未来航海: Released: May 4, 2005; Format: CD5", CD+DVD; Oricon Top 200 Weekly Peak: #1	124,344 copies sold GOLD
6th	Venus: Released: January 18, 2006; Format: CD5", CD+DVD; Oricon Top 200 Weekly Peak: #1	301,192 copies sold PLATINUM
7th	Ho! Summer; HO!サマー: Released: August 9, 2006; Format: CD5", CD+DVD; Oricon Top 200 Weekly Peak: #2	143,014 copies sold GOLD
8th	X (Dame)/Crazy Rainbow x～ダメ～ / Crazy Rainbow: Released: April 18, 2007; Format: CD5", CD+DVD; Oricon Top 200 Weekly Peak: #1	100,000 copies sold GOLD
9th	Samurai: Released: August 8, 2007; Format: CD5", CD+DVD; Oricon Top 200 Weekly Peak: #1	85,097 copies sold
10th	Koi Uta (Koi Uta)/Progress 恋詩－コイウタ－ / PROGRESS: Released: June 4, 2008; Format: CD5", CD+DVD; Oricon Top 200 Weekly Peak: #2	100,000+ copies sold GOLD
11th	Ai wa Takaramono 愛はタカラモノ: Released: November 24, 2010; Format: CD5", CD+DVD; Oricon Top 200 Weekly Peak: #1	74,898 copies sold
12th	Journey Journey ~Bokura no Mirai~; Journey Journey~ボクラノミライ~: Released: August 31, 2011; Format: CD5", CD+DVD; Oricon Top 200 Weekly Peak: #4	40,762 copies sold
13th	Heartful Voice: Released: November 23, 2011; Format: CD5", CD+DVD; Oricon Top 200 Weekly Peak: #6	47,763 copies sold
14th	Boku no Soba ni wa Hoshi ga Aru / Viva Viva More 僕のそばには星がある / ビバビバモーレ: Released: March 19, 2014; Format: CD+DVD; Oricon Top 200 Weekly Peak: TBD	TBD

=== Albums ===
#	Information	Sales
1st / Debut; Mini-Album	Hatachi: Released: September 11, 2002; Format: CD5"; Oricon Top 200 Weekly Peak: #2	265,000 copies sold PLATINUM
1st / Debut; Album	2wenty 2wo: Released: April 28, 2004; Format: CD5"; Oricon Top 200 Weekly Peak: #2	120,000 copies sold GOLD
2nd Album	Two You Four You: Released: November 15, 2006; Format: CD5", CD+DVD; Oricon Top 200 Weekly Peak: #3	100,000 copies sold GOLD
2nd Mini-Album	TRIP & TREASURE: Released: March 16, 2011; Format: CD5", CD+DVD; Oricon Top 200 Weekly Peak: #6	45,000 copies sold
3rd Album	TEN: Released: September 11, 2012; Format: CD5", CD+DVD; Oricon Top 200 Weekly Peak: #5	65,000 copies sold

=== Compilation albums ===
#	Information	Sales
1st	Tackey & Tsubasa Best Album タキツバべスト: Released: October 17, 2007; Format: CD5, CD+DVD, CD+CD2"; Oricon Top 200 Weekly Peak: #1	121,000 copies sold GOLD

#	Information	Sales
2nd	Thanks Two You サンクス・トゥー・ユー: Released: December 26, 2018; Format: CD5, CD5+DVD2, CD5+Blu-Ray"; Oricon Top 200 Weekly Peak: -	

=== DVD ===
- "Tackey and Tsubasa Haru Kon (滝翼春魂)" (February 2, 2005)
- "Tsubasa Imai 1st tour 23 to 24" (August 16, 2006)
- "Hideaki Takizawa 2005 concert ~Arigatō 2005 Toshi Sayōnara (ありがとう2005年さようなら)~" (August 30, 2006)
- "Takitsuba Clips (タキツバCLIPS)" (March 7, 2007)
- "Tackey and Tsubasa Premium Live DVD -5th Anniversary Special Package-" (March 3, 2008)
- "Tsubasa Imai Dance and Rock Tour'09" (August 2009)
