= Venus (Tackey & Tsubasa song) =

Single by Tackey & Tsubasa
- Released: January 18, 2006
- Recorded: 2005
- Genre: J-pop
- Length: 35 min 09 s (Regular CD); 30 min 43 s (Limited CD); 30 minutes 43 seconds (CD+DVD)
- Label: Avex Trax
- Songwriters: Hitoshi Haneda, Mikio Sakai, Hideyuki Obata, Kazuko Kobayashi
- Producer: Unknown

Tackey & Tsubasa singles chronology
"Kamen/Mirai Koukai" (2005)	"Venus" (2006)	"Ho! Summer" (2006)

"Venus" is Tackey & Tsubasa's sixth single under the Avex Trax label.

== Overview ==
"Venus" is Tackey & Tsubasa's sixth single, and currently their best selling single, reaching the 300,000 copies sold mark. The a-side song "Venus" was used in commercials for the ringtone service site, Mu-Mo. The b-side song "Kimi no Na wo Yobitai" was used as the ending theme for the TBS show "Zubari Iu wa yo." The other b-side song "Never Ever" was used as the opening theme song for the anime "Capeta."

Sample of the translated lyrics:

Burn, Venus, hotly, Venus
Your eyes scorch my heart
Love is a long silk road
And if I hesitate, you'll want to forget me
Feel, Venus, hotly, Venus
Show me a wind like that of a storm
You know the answer
Let loose the sparkling of your love

== Track listing ==
=== Regular CD Format ===
1. "Venus" (Hitoshi Haneda) - 4:11
2. "Kimi no Na wo Yobitai (君の名を呼びたい)" (Takizawa Hideaki) (Mikio Sakai, Hideyuki Obata) - 5:39
3. "Never Ever" (Imai Tsubasa) (Kazuko Kobayashi, Shunsuke Yazaki) - 4:23
4. "Venus: Korean Version" - 4:11
5. "Venus: Chinese Version" - 4:11
6. "Venus: Thai Version" - 4:11
7. "Venus: karaoke" - 4:10
8. "Kamen (仮面): '06 Remix" - 4:13

=== Limited CD Format ===
1. "Venus" (Hitoshi Haneda) - 4:09
2. "Kimi no Na wo Yobitai (君の名を呼びたい)" (Takizawa Hideaki) (Mikio Sakai, Hideyuki Obata) - 5:37
3. "Never Ever" (Imai Tsubasa) (Kazuko Kobayashi, Shunsuke Yazaki) - 4:21
4. "Venus: Korean Version" - 4:09
5. "Venus: Chinese Version" - 4:09
6. "Venus: Thai Version" - 4:09
7. "Venus: karaoke" - 4:09

=== CD+DVD Format ===
==== CD Portion ====
1. "Venus" (Hitoshi Haneda) - 4:09
2. "Kimi no Na wo Yobitai (君の名を呼びたい)" (Takizawa Hideaki) (Mikio Sakai, Hideyuki Obata) - 5:37
3. "Never Ever" (Imai Tsubasa) (Kazuko Kobayashi, Shunsuke Yazaki) - 4:21
4. "Venus: Korean Version" - 4:09
5. "Venus: Chinese Version" - 4:09
6. "Venus: Thai Version" - 4:09
7. "Venus: karaoke" - 4:09

==== DVD Portion ====
1. "Venus Choreography Video"

== Personnel ==
- Takizawa Hideaki - vocals
- Imai Tsubasa - vocals

== TV performances ==
- ?, 2006 - Music Fighter
- January 19, 2006 - Utaban
- January 29, 2006 - Utawara
- February 17, 2006 - Music Station
- May 5, 2006 - Music Station

== Charts ==
Oricon Sales Chart (Japan)

Release	Chart	Peak position	First week sales	Sales total	Chart run
18 January 2006	Oricon Daily Singles Chart	1			
18 January 2006	Oricon Weekly Singles Chart	1	105,782	301,192	10+ weeks
18 January 2006	Oricon Yearly Singles Chart				

== RIAJ Certification ==
As of February 2006, "Venus" has been certified platinum for shipments of over 250,000 by the Recording Industry Association of Japan.
