= Kaguyahime (band) =

Kaguyahime (Japanese: かぐや姫) is a Japanese folk/pop/rock band formed in 1970.

The second and current "generation" of the band's line-up consists of three men: Kōsetsu Minami (vocals and guitar), Shōzō Ise (vocals & guitar), and Panda Yamada (vocals and bass). Their breakthrough single was "Kandagawa" ("Kanda River"). Released in September 1973, it made it to the first place of the Oricon chart and still remains their biggest hit with 1.6 million copies sold.

== See also ==
- List of best-selling albums of the 1970s (Japan)
