= Shiro Miya =

Shirō Miya
- Born: Yoshirō Miyazaki; 17 January 1943
- Origin: Kasai, Hyōgo Prefecture, Japan
- Died: 19 November 2012 (aged 69)
- Genres: Enka
- Occupations: Singer, lyricist, composer
- Years active: 1959–2012
- Label: Columbia Music Entertainment
- Website: 38de.ojaru.jp

Japanese name
- Kanji: 宮 史郎
Transcriptions
- Romanization: Miya Shirō

Shiro Miya (宮 史郎, Miya Shirō; 17 January 1943 – 19 November 2012) was a Japanese enka singer, lyricist and composer. His band Shiro Miya and the Pinkara Trio's 1972 song "Onna no Michi", became the second best-selling single in Japanese Oricon charts history, selling over 3.25 million copies.

== Life and career ==
Miya in Kasai, Hyogo Prefecture. In 1959 while working in a cabaret in Himeji he independently produced "Otoko no Kado". In 1961, he started the comic band Suparō Boys. In 1963, he formed the comic band Pinkara Trio together with his elder brother Gorō Miya and Hiroshi Namiki.

In 1972, their debut song under the Nippon Columbia, "Onna no Michi", sold about 4 million copies, following that "Onna no Negai" and "Onna no Yume" also reached million copies in sales each.

In 1973 Hiroshi Namaki left Pinkara Trio, the band name became Pinkara Kyōdai (meaning pin kara brothers). In the same year, he sang "Onna no Michi" in NHK's year-end show Kōhaku Uta Gassen for the first time.

In 1983 Pinkara Kyōdai broke up and he began singing on his own. Gorō Miya died in 1994 and Hiroshi Namiki died in 1998.

In 2004 he appeared dressed up as an insect in a commercial and sang "Mushi Gokoro". In 2005, he also appeared in another commercial and sang "Odekake Bojō". In 2007, he performed "Onna no Michi" in the 5th story of movie Kayōkyoku dayo Jinsei wa.

On 18 March 2009 he released single "Onna no Michi: Part 2". The single peaked at No. 106 and charted for two weeks on Japanese Oricon charts.
