= 2wenty 2wo =

Album by Tackey & Tsubasa

Studio album by Tackey & Tsubasa
- Released: April 28, 2004
- Recorded: Avex Studio, Folio Sound Studio, On Air Azabu Studio, Johnny's Studio, Prime Sound Studio form, Sunrise Studio, Warner Studio
- Genre: J-pop
- Length: 67:41 (Regular CD) 62:51 (Limited CD)
- Label: avex trax
- Producers: Johnny H. Kitagawa, Jun-ichi "Randy" Tsuchiya, Shinji Hayashi, Katsuro Oshita, Haji Taniguchi, Masato "Max" Matsuura

Tackey & Tsubasa chronology
Hatachi (2002)	2wenty 2wo (2004)	Two You Four You (2006)

2wenty 2wo is Tackey & Tsubasa's debut album to be released under avex trax. The album was released on April 28, 2004, in two formats, limited edition and regular edition.

== Overview ==
The title of the album commemorates the fact that both of the singers were 22 years old when the album was released. In addition to the standard release, 2wenty 2wo was released in a limited edition that included a photo booklet.

The remixed version of the song "Sotsugyou: Sayonara wa Ashita no Tameni" is the version that was used as an insert song for the anime series InuYasha.

== Track listing ==
=== Regular CD format ===
1. "Ai Shitagari (愛シタガリ)" – 4:54
2. "Yume Monogatari (夢物語)" – 4:31
3. "Pride the End" – 4:02
4. "Ai Check it! (愛 Check it!)" – 3:48
5. "Kaze (風)" – 4:40
6. "Go On" – 3:45
7. "Diamond" – 3:54
8. "Tremolo (トレモロ)" – 4:50
9. "Futari no Yoru (2人の夜)" – 4:03
10. "Love&Tough" – 4:31
11. "Ikiteru Akashi (生きてる証)" – 4:26
12. "Love Spiral (ラブ・スパイラル)" – 4:27
13. "One Day, One Dream" – 4:21
14. "You & I" – 4:55
15. "Sotsugyou: Sayonara wa Ashita no Tameni (卒業: さよならは明日のために) (One Version)" – 6:34

=== Limited CD format ===
1. "Ai Shitagari (愛シタガリ)"
2. "Yume Monogatari (夢物語)"
3. "Pride the End"
4. "Ai Check it! (愛 Check it!)"
5. "Kaze (風)"
6. "Go On"
7. "Diamond"
8. "Futari no Yoru (2人の夜)"
9. "Love&Tough"
10. "Ikiteru Akashi (生きてる証)"
11. "Love Spiral (ラブ・スパイラル)"
12. "One Day, One Dream"
13. "You & I"
14. "Sotsugyou: Sayonara wa Ashita no Tameni (卒業: さよならは明日のために) (One Version)"

== Personnel ==
- Takizawa Hideaki – vocals
- Imai Tsubasa – vocals
- Yoshihiko Chino – guitars (tracks #1, #7 & #13) & chorus (tracks #7, #9 & #14)
- Takeshi Taneda – bass (tracks #1, #9, #13, & #14)
- Masami Yoshikawa – chorus (track #1)
- Jun Abe – keyboards (track #2)
- Kenji Suzuki – guitars (track #2)
- Tetsuo Sakurai – bass (track #2)
- Tetsuya Takahashi – chorus (tracks #2, #5, #7 & #13)
- Yu Takami – guitars (tracks #3 & #11) & bass (track #3)
- Kosaku Tanaka – chorus (tracks #3, #7, #10 & #13)
- Eiko Kubo – female chorus (tracks #3 & #4)
- Ayuko Tanaka – female chorus (track #3)
- Chokkaku – guitars (track #4)
- Hidetoshi Suzuki – guitars (track #5)
- Yasutaka Kume – guitars (tracks #6 & #10)
- Masayuki Iwata – chorus (track #6)
- Seiji Akiyama – guitars (track #8)
- Spin – bass (track #8)
- Mika Watanabe – AC guitar (track #9)
- Kosei Kubo – E guitar (track #9)
- Yoshiaki Muto – guitars (track #11)
- Audio Highs – bass (track #11)
- Minoru Komorita – chorus (track #12)
- Isao Sakuma – trumpet (track #12)
- Hajime Yamamoto – saxophone (track #12)
- Hiroyuki Nomura – trombone (track #12)
- Tetsuya Ochiai – violin (track #14)

Note: The order of the track numbers is based on the regular edition of the album.

== Production ==
- Art Direction & Design – Kenji Kiyama
- Photograph – Kenji Oyama
- Styling – Akiko Yanagida
- Hair & Make up – Hiromi Michinaka
- Creative Direction – Masahiro Ujie
- Creative Coordinate – Kanako Shino
- Location Coordinate – Tsuyoshi Kato

== Charts ==
Oricon Sales Chart (Japan)

Release	Chart	Peak position	Sales total
28 April 2004	Oricon Weekly Albums Chart	2	100,000

== RIAJ Certification ==
As of June 2004, 2wenty 2wo has been certified gold for shipments of over 100,000 by the RIAJ.
