= Pink Lady =

Pink Lady or The Pink Lady may refer to:

== Arts and entertainment ==
- The Pink Lady (musical), a 1911 musical by Ivan Caryll
- Pink Lady (art), a short-lived 1966 painting on a rock face near Malibu, California
- Pink Lady (duo), a 1970s–80s Japanese pop music duo
  - Pink Lady (1979 album), a studio album by the duo
  - Pink Lady (1981 album), a compilation album by the duo
  - Pink Lady Monogatari, a 1978 Japanese anime based on the duo
  - Pink Lady (TV series) or Pink Lady and Jeff, a 1980 American television show starring the duo
- The Pink Ladies, female companions of the T-Birds in the two Grease movies and their stage musicals

== Food and medicine ==
- Cripps Pink, an apple cultivar sold under the brand name Pink Lady
- Pink Lady (cocktail), a gin-based cocktail, popular in the United States in the 1920s and 30s
- Pink lady (medicine), a drug cocktail used to treat gastroesophageal reflux
- Pink lady, a denaturant mixture added to discourage World War II-era US Navy submariners from drinking torpedo juice

== Games ==
- Pink Lady (card game), a variant of Hearts and Black Lady
- Pink Nines, a card game in the same family as Newmarket

== Transportation ==
- Pink Lady (quartzite), railroad track ballast
- The Pink Lady (aircraft), a B-17G Flying Fortress bomber
- Ella's Pink Lady, the yacht used by Australian sailor Jessica Watson during her round-the-world voyage

== People ==
- Hazel Dawn (1890–1988), nicknamed "The Pink Lady" and one of the stars of the musical of the same name
- Ri Chun-hee (born 1943), nicknamed "The Pink Lady", a North Korean news presenter
- "The Pink Lady", a smear nickname given to American politician Helen Douglas (1900–1980) by opponents to imply Communist sympathies

== Other ==
- Pink Ladies (anti-immigration group), a British women-led anti-immigration group started in 2025
