= Colors ~ 30th Anniversary All Time Best =

Greatest hits album by Keiko Masuda
- Released: 7 November 2012
- Recorded: 1981–2012
- Genre: J-pop; kayōkyoku
- Language: Japanese; French
- Label: Warner Music Japan

Keiko Masuda chronology
Moichido Asobimasho: Now & Then (2008)	Colors ~ 30th Anniversary All Time Best (2012)	Ai Shōka (2014)

Colors ~ 30th Anniversary All Time Best is a greatest hits album by Japanese singer Keiko Masuda. Released through Warner Music Japan on November 7, 2012 to coincide with the 30th anniversary of Masuda's solo career, the album compiles her solo works from her Reprise Records, For Life Music, Bourbon Records, Universal Music Japan, and King Records eras. It also includes the new song "Shiroi Kobato", a cover of Eiko Shuri's 1974 hit, plus re-recordings of three Pink Lady-era songs.

The album peaked at No. 298 on Oricon's Weekly Albums chart.

== Track listing ==
Disc 1

No.	Title	Lyrics	Music	Arrangement	Length
1.	"Suzume" ((すずめ, "Sparrow"))	Miyuki Nakajima	Nakajima	Nozomi Aoki
2.	"Eve" (Ivu (前夜祭（イヴ）))	Aya Sagan	Jun Horie	Aoki
3.	"Tamerai" ((ためらい, "Hesitation"))	Yumi Matsutoya	Matsutoya	Kōji Makaino
4.	"Shōshin" ((傷心, "Heartache"))	Rabi Nakayama	Kei Ogura	Makaino
5.	"Rasen Kaidan" ((らせん階段, "Spiral Staircase"))	Mariya Takeuchi	Takeuchi	Kazuo Shiina
6.	"Actress" (Akutoresu (アクトレス))	Kazumi Yasui	Kazuhiko Katō	Nobuyuki Shimizu
7.	"Joyū" ((女優, "Actress"))	Keisuke Kuwata	Kuwata	Jun Satō
8.	"FU・RI・NE" (Furin (ふ・り・ん, "Infidelity"))	Hiromi	Takashi Toshimi	Mitsuo Hagita
9.	"Aiiro no Inshō - Avec le Feu" ((哀色の印象-Avec le Feu, "Impression of Sorrow - With Fire"))	Mayuko Riino; Helen Bank	Christian Holl; Serge Mazeres	Holl; Sanga Pierre; Lobry Pascal
10.	"Unmei ga Kawaru Asa" ((運命が変わる朝, "The Morning When Fate Changes"))	Riino; Bank	Holl	Holl
11.	"Kiseki no Hana" ((奇蹟の花, "Miracle Flower"))	Chikaco Sawada	Rie	AZC
12.	"Suzume ~ Acoustic Version '05" ((すずめ ~アコースティック・バージョン ’05))	Nakajima	Nakajima	AZC
13.	"Shiroi Kobato [New Recording]" ((白い小鳩, "White Little Pigeon"))	Michio Yamagami	Shunichi Tokura	Kunihito Shiina

Disc 2

No.	Title	Lyrics	Music	Arrangement	Length
1.	"Hitori no Heya" ((一人の部屋, "One Room"))	Horie	Horie	Motoki Funayama
2.	"Tsukanoma no Ame" ((つかの間の雨, "Fleeting Rain"))	Shōzō Ise	Ise	Makaino
3.	"Hoshi ni Natta Papa" ((星になったパパ, "Papa Went to the Stars"))	Sagan	Toshiaki Matsumoto	Aoki
4.	"Hello to Me" (Harō tu Mī (ハロー･トゥ・ミー))	Sagan	Matsumoto	Aki
5.	"Motto Kudasai" ((もっと下さい, "More, Please"))	Arisu Shiraishi	Takuro Yoshida	Makaino
6.	"Sofa no Kubomi" (Sofā no Kubomi (ソファーのくぼみ, "The Sofa's Depression"))	Shiraishi	Yoshida	Makaino
7.	"Love Magic" (Rabu Majikku (ラブ・マジック))	Kazumi Yasui	Kato	Shimizu
8.	"Yesterday & Today"	Erina Shima	Mami Tanaka	Eiji Kawamura
9.	"55 Page no Kanashimi" (Gojū-go Pēji no Kanashimi (55ページの悲しみ, "55 Pages of Sadness"))	Takeuchi	Takeuchi	Kazuo Shiina
10.	"Good-Bye Again"	Etsuko Kisugi	Takao Kisugi	Makaino
11.	"Spiral"	Sawada	Miki Fujisue	Atsushi Onozawa
12.	"Moichido Asobimasho" ((もいちど遊びましょ, "Let's Play Again"))	Haruo Chikada	Chikada	Chikada
13.	"Yume Made no Jikan" ((夢までの時間, "Time to Dream"))	Fumiko Okada	Tetsuji Hayashi	Hayashi
14.	"Yes, My Life"	Mona	M.Y.	Onozawa
15.	"UFO"	Yū Aku	Tokura	Masaaki Kina
16.	"Nagisa no Sindbad" (Nagisa no Shindobaddo (渚のシンドバッド, "Sindbad of the Beach"))	Aku	Tokura	Onozawa
17.	"Inspiration [Bonus Track]" (Insupirēshon (インスピレーション))	Aku	Tokura	Katsunori Ishida
18.	"California Blue [Bonus Track]" (Kariforunia Burū (カリフォルニア・ブルー))	Akira Ito	Tatsushi Umegaki	Umegaki

== Charts ==
Chart (2012)	Peak position
Japanese Oricon Albums Chart	298
