= Concert Tour 2011 "Innovation" =

Video by Pink Lady
- Released: December 28, 2011
- Recorded: September 19, 2011
- Venues: Tokyo International Forum Hall A Marunouchi, Tokyo, Japan
- Genres: J-pop; disco; kayōkyoku
- Length: 145 minutes
- Languages: Japanese; English
- Label: Victor

Pink Lady chronology
| Pink Lady in Yoru no Hit Studio ~ Fuji TV Hizō Eizō-shū (2011) | Concert Tour 2011 "Innovation" (2011) |

Concert Tour 2011 "Innovation" is a live video by Japanese duo Pink Lady. Recorded live at the Tokyo International Forum Hall A in Marunouchi, Tokyo on September 19, 2011, the video was released on December 28, 2011, by Victor Entertainment on DVD format. The video highlights the final show of the duo's comeback tour after declaring: "No more disbandments!" (解散やめ！, Kaisan yame!) on September 1, 2010.

== Track listing ==
All lyrics are written by Yū Aku, except where indicated; all music is composed by Shunichi Tokura, except where indicated.

Disc 1: Concert
| No. | Title | Lyrics | Music | Length |
|---|---|---|---|---|
| 1. | "Opening" (Ōpuningu (オープニング)) |
| 2. | "Monday Mona Lisa Club" (Mandē Mona Riza Kurabu (マンデー・モナリザ・クラブ)) |
| 3. | "Carmen '77" (Karumen Nana-jū Nana (カルメン'77)) |
| 4. | "Talk 1" (Tōku Wan (トーク1)) |
| 5. | "Kampai Ojōsan" ((乾杯お嬢さん; "Cheers, Miss")) |
| 6. | "Strangers When We Kiss" | Michael Lloyd | Lloyd |
| 7. | "Kiss in the Dark" | Lloyd | Lloyd |
| 8. | "Talk 2" (Tōku Tsū (トーク2)) |
| 9. | "By Myself" | Noriko Miura | Makoto Kawaguchi |
| 10. | "Pepper Keibu" (Peppā Keibu (ペッパー警部; "Inspector Pepper")) |
| 11. | "Wanted (Shimei Tehai)" (Uonteddo (Shimei Tehai) (ウォンテッド (指名手配); "Wanted (Fugitive Warrant)")) |
| 12. | "Audience Monster" (Ōdiensu Monsutā (オーディエンス・モンスター)) |
| 13. | "Body & Soul" | Chinfa Kan | Yūsuke Hoguchi |
| 14. | "Milano Rose" (Mirano Rōzu (ミラノ・ローズ)) | Yoshiko Miura | Kawaguchi |
| 15. | "Show Me the Way to Love" | Lloyd | Lloyd |
| 16. | "Talk 3" (Tōku Surī (トーク3)) |
| 17. | "Ai Giri Giri" ((愛・GIRI GIRI; "Last Minute Love")) | Shizuka Ijūin | Yūichirō Oda |
| 18. | "Do Your Best" | Ijūin |
| 19. | "S.O.S." |
| 20. | "Nagisa no Sindbad" (Nagisa no Shindobaddo (渚のシンドバッド; "Sindbad of the Beach")) |
| 21. | "Kibō e no Senritsu" ((希望への旋律; "A Melody to Hope")) | Kazu Katagiri | Kawaguchi |
| 22. | "Talk 4" (Tōku Fō (トーク4)) |
| 23. | "UFO" |
| 24. | "Southpaw" (Sausupō (サウスポー)) |
| 25. | "Zipangu" (Jipangu (ジパング)) |
| 26. | "Encore Talk" (Ankōru Tōku (アンコール・トーク)) |
| 27. | "OH!" |
| 28. | "Pink Typhoon (In the Navy)" (Pinku Taifūn (In za Nebī) (ピンク・タイフーン (In the Navy))) | Tomoko Okada | Jacques Morali; Henri Belolo; Victor Willis |
| 29. | "Ending" (Engingu (エンディング)) |
| Total length: | | | | 136:00 |

Disc 2: Bonus Disc
| No. | Title | Length |
|---|---|---|
| 1. | "Pepper Keibu (Choreography Master Angle/Concert Video Alternate Cut)" (Peppā Keibu (Furitsuke Masutā Anguru/Konsāto Eizō-betsu Katto) (ペッパー警部（フリツケ・マスター・アングル／コンサート映像・別カット）)) |
| 2. | "Nagisa no Sindbad (Choreography Master Angle/Concert Video Alternate Cut)" (Nagisa no Shindobaddo (Furitsuke Masutā Anguru/Konsāto Eizō-betsu Katto) (渚のシンドバッド（フリツケ・マスター・アングル／コンサート映像・別カット）)) |
| 3. | "UFO (Choreography Master Angle/Concert Video Alternate Cut)" (Yūfō (Furitsuke Masutā Anguru/Konsāto Eizō-betsu Katto) (UFO（フリツケ・マスター・アングル／コンサート映像・別カット）)) |
| 4. | "9.18 Talk Corner" (9.18 Tōku Kōnā (9.18トークコーナー)) |
| 5. | "To the Stage (9.19 Documentary)" (Iza sutēji e (9.19 Dokyumento) (いざステージへ（9.19ドキュメント）)) |
| 6. | "Stage Is Finished... (9.19 Documentary)" (Sutēji wo Oe... (9.19 Dokyumento) (ステージを終え…（9.19ドキュメント）)) |
| 7. | "Press Conference (9.19 Documentary)" (Kisha Kaiken (9.19 Dokyumento) (記者会見（9.19ドキュメント）)) |
| 8. | "At the Launch Venue (9.19 Documentary)" (Uchiage Kaijō Nite (9.19 Dokyumento) (打上げ会場にて（9.19ドキュメント）)) |
| Total length: | | 36:00 |

== Personnel ==
- Mie and Keiko Masuda – vocals
- Tommy G – manipulator
- Jun Asahi – keyboards
- Kenta Harada – guitar
- Teppei Kawasaki – bass
- Yukihiro Matsumoto – drums
