= Hitori ga Suki =

Studio album by Keiko Masuda
- Released: 18 February 1982
- Recorded: 1981
- Genre: J-pop; kayōkyoku
- Label: Reprise Records

Keiko Masuda chronology
Hitori ga Suki (1982)	Koisuru wa Tomodachi (1982)

Singles from Hitori ga Suki
- 1. "Suzume" Released: 28 November 1981

Hitori ga Suki (ひとりが好き, I Like to Be Alone) is the debut album by Japanese singer Keiko Masuda. The album was released on February 18, 1982, less than a year after the dissolution of her group Pink Lady. It contains Masuda's first single "Suzume" (すずめ, "Sparrow"), which peaked at No. 9 on Oricon's singles charts and sold 267,000 copies.

== Track listing ==
Side A
No.	Title	Lyrics	Music	Arrangement	Length
1.	"Suzume" ((すずめ, "Sparrow"))	Miyuki Nakajima	Nakajima	Nozomi Aoki
2.	"Tsukanoma no Ame" ((つかの間の雨, "Fleeting Rain"))	Shōzō Ise	Ise	Kōji Makaino
3.	"Terminal" (Tāminaru (ターミナル))	Ise	Ise	Aoki
4.	"Last Scene" (Rasuto Shīn (ラスト･シーン))	Jun Horie	Horie	Motoki Funayama
5.	"Hitori no Heya" ((一人の部屋, "One Room"))	Horie	Horie	Funayama

Side B
No.	Title	Lyrics	Music	Arrangement	Length
1.	"Motto Kudasai" ((もっと下さい, "More, Please"))	Arisu Shiraishi	Takuro Yoshida	Makaino
2.	"Sofa no Kubomi" (Sofā no Kubomi (ソファーのくぼみ, "The Sofa's Depression"))	Shiraishi	Yoshida	Makaino
3.	"Hoshi ni Natta Papa" ("Papa Went to the Stars" (星になったパパ))	Aya Sagan	Toshiaki Matsumoto	Aoki
4.	"Hello to Me" (Harō tu Mī (ハロー･トゥ・ミー))	Sagan	Matsumoto	Aoki
5.	"Eve" (Ivu (前夜祭（イヴ）))	Sagan	Horie	Aoki

== See also ==
- 1982 in Japanese music
