= Soshite, Koko kara... =

Compilation album by Keiko Masuda
- Released: July 27, 2022
- Recorded: 1976–2022; November 28, 2021 (DVD)
- Genre: J-pop; kayōkyoku; jazz
- Length: 90 minutes (DVD)
- Language: Japanese; English
- Label: Victor

Keiko Masuda chronology
Ai Shōka (2014)	Soshite, Koko kara... (2022)

Singles from Soshite, Koko kara...
- 1. "Del Sole" Released: April 27, 2022; 2. "Et j'aime la vie ~ Ima ga Suki" Released: May 25, 2022

Soshite, Koko kara... [40th Anniversary Platinum Album] (そして、ここから…; And, From Now On...) is a compilation album by Japanese singer Keiko Masuda. Released through Victor on July 27, 2022, to coincide with the 40th anniversary of Masuda's solo career, the album compiles her solo works from 1981 to 2022, plus two songs she recorded during her days as a member of Pink Lady and a selection of live recordings. A limited edition release includes a DVD covering her 40th anniversary concert and a photo book.

The album peaked at No. 118 on Oricon's albums chart.

== Track listing ==
Disc 1: Kei Solo Works 1977–2018
No.	Title	Lyrics	Music	Arrangement	Length
1.	"Inspiration (インスピレーション, Insupirēshon)"	Yū Aku	Shunichi Tokura	Katsunori Ishida
2.	"California Blue (カリフォルニア・ブルー, Kariforunia Burū)"	Akira Itō	Makoto Kawaguchi	Kawaguchi
3.	"Suzume (すずめ; "Sparrow")"	Miyuki Nakajima	Nakajima	Nozomi Aoki
4.	"Tamerai (ためらい; "Hesitation")"	Yumi Matsutoya	Matsutoya	Kōji Makaino
5.	"Rasen Kaidan (らせん階段; "Spiral Staircase")"	Mariya Takeuchi	Takeuchi	Kazuo Shiina
6.	"Joyū (女優; "Actress")"	Keisuke Kuwata	Kuwata	Jun Satō
7.	"FU・RI・NE (ふ・り・ん, Furin; "Infidelity")"	Hiromi	Takashi Toshimi	Mitsuo Hagita
8.	"Aiiro no Inshō - Avec le Feu (哀色の印象-Avec le Feu; "Impression of Sorrow - With Fire")"	Mayuko Riino; Helen Bank	Christian Holl; Serge Mazeres	Holl; Sanga Pierre; Lobry Pascal
9.	"Unmei ga Kawaru Asa (運命が変わる朝; "The Morning When Fate Changes")"	Riino; Bank	Holl	Holl
10.	"Kiseki no Hana (奇蹟の花; "Miracle Flower")"	Chikako Sawada	Rie	AZC
11.	"Saigo no Koi (最後の恋; "Last Love")"	Aku	Tokiko Kato	Kenichi Maeyamada
12.	"Inspiration" (Live at Tokyo Yūbin Chokin Kaikan, March 31, 1977)	Aku	Tokura
13.	"Take Me Home, Country Roads (カントリー・ロード, Kantorī Rōdo)" (Live at Tokyo Yūbin Chokin Kaikan, March 31, 1977)	Fumiko Okada; Bill Danoff; Taffy Nivert; John Denver	Danoff; Nivert; Denver
14.	"Things (初恋の並木道, Hatsukoi no Namikimichi; "First Love on a Tree-lined Road")" (Live at Tokyo Yūbin Chokin Kaikan, March 31, 1977)	Bobby Darin	Darin
15.	"Hotel California (ホテル・カリフォルニア, Hoteru Kariforunia)" (Live at Denen Coliseum, July 26, 1977)	Okada; Don Felder; Don Henley; Glenn Frey	Felder; Henley; Frey
16.	"Yesterday When I Was Young (帰り来ぬ青春, Kaeri konu Seishun)" (Live at Nippon Budokan, December 27, 1977)	Okada; Charles Aznavour	Aznavour
17.	"Gentle on My Mind (ジェントル・オン・マイ・マインド, Jentoru on Mai Maindo)" (Live at Nippon Budokan, December 27, 1977)	Okada; John Hartford	Hartford
18.	"The House of the Rising Sun (朝日のあたる家, Asahi no Atarui e)" (Live at Tropicana Las Vegas, April 21, 1978)	Traditional; Alan Price	Traditional; Price
19.	"Chained to Your Love (チェインド・トゥ・ユア・ラブ, Cheindo tu Yua Rabu)" (Live at Korakuen Stadium, July 23, 1978)	Reid Whitelaw; Norman Bergen	Whitelaw; Bergen

Disc 2: And, From Now On...
No.	Title	Lyrics	Music	Length
1.	"Del Sole (デル・ソーレ, Deru Sōre)"	Yuriko Mori	Kei Tsuda
2.	"Et j'aime la vie ~ Ima ga Suki (Et j'aime la vie（エ・ジェム・ラ・ヴィ）～今が好き; "I Like It Now")"	Megumi Ayukawa	Chika Ueda
3.	"Himawari wa Utsumukanai (向日葵はうつむかない; "Sunflowers Don't Look Down")"	Aku	Tokura
4.	"Kanransha (観覧車; "Ferris Wheel")"	Aku	Ryudo Uzaki
5.	"Komorebi no Isu (こもれびの椅子; "Armchair")"	Gorō Matsui	Alberto Pizzo
6.	"Kiseki no Hana" (Studio Live)	Sawada	Rie
7.	"Aiiro no Inshō - Avec le Feu" (Studio Live)	Riino; Bank	Holl; Mazeres
8.	"Suzume" (Studio Live)	Nakajima	Nakajima
9.	"Saigo no Koi" (Studio Live)	Aku	Kato
10.	"Shiroi Kobato (白い小鳩; "White Little Pigeon")" (Studio Live)	Michio Yamagami	Tokura
11.	"Ai Shōka (愛唱歌; "Love Songs")" (Studio Live)	Yoko Aki	Uzaki
12.	"California Blue" (Studio Live)	Itō	Kawaguchi
13.	"Key" (Studio Live)	Akira Yamazaki	Yamazaki
14.	"UFO" (Studio Live)	Aku	Tokura
15.	"Nagisa no Sindbad (渚のシンドバッド, Nagisa no Shindobaddo; "Sindbad of the Beach")" (Studio Live)	Aku	Tokura
16.	"Chameleon Army (カメレオン アーミー, Kamereon Āmī)" (Studio Live)	Aku	Tokura
17.	"OH!" (Studio Live)	Aku	Tokura
18.	"Moichido Asobimasho (もいちど遊びましょ; "Let's Play Again")" (Studio Live)	Haruo Chikada	Chikada

DVD: 40th Anniversary Performance Live
No.	Title	Lyrics	Music	Length
1.	"Kiseki no Hana"	Sawada	Rie
2.	"Aiiro no Inshō - Avec le Feu"	Riino; Bank	Holl; Mazeres
3.	"Suzume"	Nakajima	Nakajima
4.	"Saigo no Koi"	Aku	Kato
5.	"Million Roses (百万本のバラ, Hyakumanbon no Bara)"	Kato; Andrei Voznesensky	Raimonds Pauls
6.	"Et j'aime la vie ~ Ima ga Suki"	Ayukawa	Ueda
7.	"You've Got a Friend"	Carole King	King
8.	"Ai Shōka"	Aki	Uzaki
9.	"California Blue"	Itō	Kawaguchi
10.	"Key"	Yamazaki	Yamazaki
11.	"Himawari wa Utsumukanai"	Aku	Tokura
12.	"UFO"	Aku	Tokura
13.	"Nagisa no Sindbad"	Aku	Tokura
14.	"Chameleon Army"	Aku	Tokura
15.	"OH!"	Aku	Tokura
16.	"Moichido Asobimasho"	Chikada	Chikada

== Charts ==
Chart (2022)	Peak position
Japanese Oricon Albums Chart	118
