= Go for It, Baby (Kioku no Sanmyaku) =

Single by B'z
- Released: April 4, 2012
- Genre: Hard rock
- Length: 4:40
- Label: Vermillion Records
- Songwriters: Koshi Inaba, Tak Matsumoto
- Producer: Tak Matsumoto

B'z singles chronology
| "Don't Wanna Lie" (2011) | "Go for It, Baby (Kioku no Sanmyaku)" (2012) | "Uchōten" (2015) |

"Go for It, Baby (Kioku no Sanmyaku)" is the 50th single by Japanese rock duo B'z. It was released on April 4, 2012. The song debuted at #1 on the Oricon Singles Chart, selling 143,000 copies in its first week. It also reached number one on the Billboard Japan Hot 100 and the Top Singles Sales chart. The Recording Industry Association of Japan certified the single Gold for its sales of 100,000 copies. With this single, B'z has remained on top of the charts for a total of 63 weeks, breaking a record and tying up with female pop duo Pink Lady. The song was used by Pepsi as a jingle, the second time they did it with a song by B'z (the first having been with their 2011 single "Sayonara Kizu Darake no Hibi yo").

== Track listing ==
Single

1. Go for It, Baby (Kioku no Sanmyaku) (GO FOR IT, BABY -キオクの山脈) - 4:40
2. Honokanaru Hi (仄かなる火) - 4:13
3. Ryuusei Mask (流星マスク) - 3:16

DVD

1. Go for It, Baby (Kioku no Sanmyaku) (music video)
2. Pepsi Nex presents B'z 1Day Live at Shibuya-AX
- "Sayonara Kizu Darake no Hibi yo"
- "Ichibu to Zenbu"
- "Liar! Liar!"

== Certifications ==
| Region | Certification | Certified units/sales |
|---|---|---|
| Japan (RIAJ) | Gold | 100,000^{^} |
^{^} Shipments figures based on certification alone.
