= Terebi ga Kita Hi =

Single by Pink Lady
- Language: Japanese
- English title: The Day the TV Came
- B-side: "Monster Wave"
- Released: May 5, 2003
- Recorded: 2003
- Genre: J-pop; children's
- Label: Teichiku
- Composer: Shunichi Tokura
- Lyricist: Yū Aku

Pink Lady singles chronology
"Pink Eyed Soul" (1996)	"Terebi ga Kita Hi" (2003)	"Meteor" (2019)

"Terebi ga Kita Hi" (テレビが来た日; lit. "The Day the TV Came") is the 25th single by Japanese duo Pink Lady, released on May 5, 2003. Written by longtime Pink Lady songwriters Shunichi Tokura and Yū Aku, the song was recorded for NHK's Minna no Uta (みんなのうた; Everyone's Song) as part of the network's 50th anniversary celebration. The music video for the song features CGI animated versions of the duo.

The song peaked at No. 183 on Oricon's singles chart.

== Track listing ==
All lyrics are written by Yū Aku; all music is composed and arranged by Shunichi Tokura.

No.	Title	Length
1.	"Terebi ga Kita Hi" ((テレビが来た日; "The Day the TV Came"))
2.	"Terebi ga Kita Hi (Original Karaoke)"
3.	"Terebi ga Kita Hi (General Melody Karaoke)"
4.	"Monster Wave" ("Monsutā Uēbu" (モンスターウェーブ))
5.	"Monster Wave (Original Karaoke)"
6.	"Monster Wave (General Melody Karaoke)"

== Charts ==
Chart (2003)	Peak position
Japanese Oricon Singles Chart	183
