= Nami Nori Pirates =

Single by Pink Lady

from the album Magical Music Tour
- Language: Japanese
- English title: Surfing Pirates
- B-side: "Nami Nori Pirates (U.S.A. Version)"
- Released: July 5, 1979
- Genre: J-pop; kayōkyoku; surf
- Length: 8:25
- Label: Victor
- Composer: Shunichi Tokura
- Lyricist: Yū Aku
- Producer: Hisahiko Iida

Pink Lady singles chronology
"Pink Typhoon (In the Navy)" (1979)	"Nami Nori Pirates" (1979)	"Kiss in the Dark" (1979)

"Nami Nori Pirates" (波乗りパイレーツ, Nami Nori Pairētsu; lit. "Surfing Pirates") is the 13th single by Pink Lady. It was released on 5 July 1979, with a peak position on the Oricon charts of #4, and also a #4 position on the Japanese Music Labo chart. It was also the duo's last top-five single.

The B-side, an alternate version of the song used on their Magical Music Tour studio album, features members of The Beach Boys on backing vocals.

The single was also featured on the Japanese music program The Best Ten, where it peaked at #7. It sold approximately 550,000 copies.

== Track listing (7" vinyl) ==
All lyrics are written by Yū Aku; all music is composed by Shunichi Tokura.

No.	Title	Arrangement	Length
1.	"Nami Nori Pirates" (Nami Nori Pairētsu (波乗りパイレーツ; "Surfing Pirates"))	Shunichi Tokura	3:50
2.	"Nami Nori Pirates (U.S.A. Version)"	Paul Fauerso	4:35

== Personnel for U.S.A. version ==
- Mike Love, Brian Wilson, Carl Wilson, Bruce Johnston, and Paul Fauerso - Backing vocals
- Eddie Tuduri - Drums
- Ed Carter - Guitar & bass
- Paul Fauerso - Keyboards & percussion

== Chart positions ==
Chart (1979)	Peak position
Japanese Oricon Singles Chart	4
Japanese Music Labo Chart	4

== See also ==
- 1979 in Japanese music
