= Live in Budoukan =

Live album by Pink Lady
- Released: February 5, 1979
- Recorded: December 25, 1978
- Venue: Nippon Budokan
- Genre: J-pop; kayōkyoku; disco; teen pop
- Length: 51:17
- Language: Japanese; English
- Label: Victor
- Producer: Hisahiko Iida

Pink Lady chronology
| Pink Lady no Katsudō Daishashin (1978) | Live in Budoukan (1979) | UFO/Southpaw (1979) |

Live in Budoukan (ライブ・イン武道館, Raibu in Budōkan) is the sixth live album by Japanese idol duo Pink Lady. Recorded live during their Christmas concert at the Nippon Budokan on December 25, 1978, it was released on February 5, 1979.

The album peaked at No. 24 on Oricon's weekly albums chart and sold over 26,000 copies.

== Track listing ==
Side A
| No. | Title | Writer(s) | Length |
|---|---|---|---|
| 1. | "Opening (オープニング, Ōpuningu)" | Shunichi Tokura | 5:34 |
| 2. | "Hoshi kara Kita Futari (星から来た二人; "Two People from the Stars")" | Yū Aku; Tokura | 3:45 |
| 3. | "Medley (メドレー, Medorē): "Pepper Keibu" (ペッパー警部, Peppā Keibu; "Inspector Pepper"); S.O.S.; "Carmen '77" (カルメン '77, Karumen Nanajū-nana)" | Aku; Tokura | 5:28 |
| 4. | "Screen Disco Medley (スクリーン・ディスコ・メドレー, Sukurīn Disuko Medorē): "20th Century Fox Theme" (20世紀フォックステーマ, Nijū Seiki Fokkusu Tēma); "Movie Lover's Disco" (ムービー・ラバース・ディスコ, Mūbī Rabāsu Disuko); "Love Story" (ある愛の詩, Aru Ai no Uta); "Love Is a Many-Splendored Thing" (慕情, Bojō); "Un homme et une femme" (男と女, Otoko to Onna); "Johnny Guitar" (ジャニー・ギター, Janī Gitā); "Moon River" (ムーン・リバー, Mūn Ribā); "The Windmills of Your Mind" (風のささやき, Kaze no Sasayaki); "Singin' in the Rain" (雨に歌えば, Ame ni Utaeba); "Entertainer (20th Century Fox Theme (Instrumental))" (エンターテイナー(20世紀フォックステーマ(Instrumental)), Entāteinā (Nijū Seiki Fokkusu Tēma (Insutorumentaru)))" | Alfred Newman; Alan and Marilyn Bergman; Arthur Freed; Carl Sigman; Francis Lai; Henry Mancini; Jacques Demy; Johnny Mercer; Michel Legrand; Nacio Herb Brown; P. Krissen; Paul Francis Webster; Peggy Lee; Pierre Barouh; Sammy Fain; T. Lexter; Victor Young | 12:57 |

Side B
| No. | Title | Writer(s) | Length |
|---|---|---|---|
| 1. | "Love Countdown (ラブ・カウントダウン, Rabu Kauntodaun)" | Detlef Petersen; James Hopkins; James Harrison; Geoffey Peacey | 4:05 |
| 2. | "Medley (メドレー, Medorē): "Nagisa no Sindbad" (渚のシンドバッド, Nagisa no Shindobaddo; "Sindbad of the Beach"); "Wanted (Shimei Tehai)" (ウォンテッド（指名手配）, Uonteddo (Shimei Tehai); "Wanted (Fugitive Warrant)"); "Monster" (モンスター, Monsutā)" | Aku; Tokura | 6:55 |
| 3. | "Southpaw (サウスポー, Sausupō)" | Aku; Tokura | 2:06 |
| 4. | "UFO" | Aku; Tokura | 1:40 |
| 5. | "Chameleon Army (カメレオン・アーミー, Kamereon Āmī)" | Aku; Tokura | 2:38 |
| 6. | "Ending: I Love How You Love Me ~ Last Dance (エンディング：忘れたいのに ～ ラスト・ダンス, Endingu: Wasuretai no Ni ~ Rasuto Dansu)" | Barry Mann; Larry Kolber; Paul Jabara | 6:09 |

== Chart position ==
| Chart (1979) | Peak position |
|---|---|
| Japanese Oricon Albums Chart | 24 |

== See also ==
- 1979 in Japanese music
