= 1979 in Japanese music =

Japanese music accounted for sixty percent of record sales in the Japanese music market in 1979 (Shōwa 54), the rest being sales of foreign music. During that year, Japan continued to have the second largest music market in the world.

== Awards, contests and festivals ==
The 12th Japan Record Sales Awards (Japanese: 日本レコードセールス大賞) were held in 1979. The 21st Osaka International Festival (Japanese: 大阪国際フェスティバル) was held from 8 to 24 April 1979. The 17th Yamaha Popular Song Contest was held on 6 May 1979. The 8th Tokyo Music Festival was held on 17 June 1979. The 18th Yamaha Popular Song Contest was held on 7 October 1979.

The 10th World Popular Song Festival was held from 9 to 11 November 1979. The song Daitokai by Crystal King, and the song Sitting on the Edge of the Ocean by Bonnie Tyler, won the grand prix awards.

The 10th Japan Music Awards were held on 23 November 1979.

The final of the 8th FNS Music Festival was on 18 December 1979. The grand prize winner was Hideki Saijo.

The 21st Japan Record Awards were held on 31 December 1979. The song Miserarete by Judy Ongg won the Japan Record Award.

The 30th NHK Kōhaku Uta Gassen was held on 31 December 1979.

The 28th Otaka prize was won by Yoriaki Matsudaira.

== Concerts ==
The "Japan Jam" was held on 4 to 5 August. The Southern All Stars appeared.

== Number one singles ==
Oricon

The following reached number 1 on the weekly Oricon Singles Chart:

Issue date	Song	Artist(s)
1 January	"Chameleon Army"	Pink Lady
8 January	"Chameleon Army"	Pink Lady
15 January	"Chameleon Army"	Pink Lady
22 January	"Chameleon Army"	Pink Lady
29 January	"Champion"	Alice
5 February	"Champion"	Alice
12 February	"Champion"	Alice
19 February	"Champion"	Alice
26 February	"Hero (Hero ni Naru Toki, Sore wa Ima)"	Kai Band
5 March	"Hero (Hero ni Naru Toki, Sore wa Ima)"	Kai Band
12 March	"Young Man (Y.M.C.A.)"	Hideki Saijo
19 March	"Young Man (Y.M.C.A.)"	Hideki Saijo
26 March	"Young Man (Y.M.C.A.)"	Hideki Saijo
2 April	"Young Man (Y.M.C.A.)"	Hideki Saijo
9 April	"Young Man (Y.M.C.A.)"	Hideki Saijo
16 April	"Miserarete"	Judy Ongg
23 April	"Miserarete"	Judy Ongg
30 April	"Miserarete"	Judy Ongg
7 May	"Miserarete"	Judy Ongg
14 May	"Miserarete"	Judy Ongg
21 May	"Miserarete"	Judy Ongg
28 May	"Miserarete"	Judy Ongg
4 June	"Miserarete"	Judy Ongg
11 June	"Miserarete"	Judy Ongg
18 June	"Kimi no Asa"	Satoshi Kishida
25 June	"Kimi no Asa"	Satoshi Kishida
2 July	"Kimi no Asa"	Satoshi Kishida
9 July	"Kimi no Asa"	Satoshi Kishida
16 July	"Kimi no Asa"	Satoshi Kishida
23 July	"Omoide-zake"	Sachiko Kobayashi
30 July	"Kanpaku Sengen"	Masashi Sada
6 August	"Kanpaku Sengen"	Masashi Sada
13 August	"Kanpaku Sengen"	Masashi Sada
20 August	"Kanpaku Sengen"	Masashi Sada
27 August	"Kanpaku Sengen"	Masashi Sada
3 September	"Kanpaku Sengen"	Masashi Sada
10 September	"Kanpaku Sengen"	Masashi Sada
17 September	"Kanpaku Sengen"	Masashi Sada
24 September	"Kanpaku Sengen"	Masashi Sada
1 October	"Kanpaku Sengen"	Masashi Sada
8 October	"Sexual Violet No. 1"	Masahiro Kuwana
15 October	"Sexual Violet No. 1"	Masahiro Kuwana
22 October	"Sexual Violet No. 1"	Masahiro Kuwana
29 October	"Oyaji no Ichiban Nagai Hi"	Masashi Sada
5 November	"Oyaji no Ichiban Nagai Hi"	Masashi Sada
12 November	"Oyaji no Ichiban Nagai Hi"	Masashi Sada
19 November	"Oyaji no Ichiban Nagai Hi"	Masashi Sada
26 November	"Oyaji no Ichiban Nagai Hi"	Masashi Sada
3 December	"Oyaji no Ichiban Nagai Hi"	Masashi Sada
10 December	"Ihōjin"	Saki Kubota
17 December	"Ihōjin"	Saki Kubota
24 December	"Ihōjin"	Saki Kubota
31 December	"Ihōjin"	Saki Kubota

The Best Ten

The following reached number 1 on The Best Ten chart:

- Casablanca Dandy - Kenji Sawada. This single was released on 1 February 1979.
- 26 July, 2 August, 9 August and 16 August: Kariforunia Konekushon (California Connection) by Yutaka Mizutani
- 23 August, 30 August, 6 September, 13 September, 20 September, 27 September: The Galaxy Express 999 by Godiego
- 27 December: Ihojin by Saki Kubota

== Number one albums and LPs ==
Oricon

The following albums reached number 1 on the Oricon chart:

- 31 December: Yumegatari by Saki Kubota
- Shin'ai Naru Mono e by Miyuki Nakajima reached number 1 on the Oricon chart.

Music Labo

The following reached number 1 on the Music Labo chart:

- 10 and 17 December: Kisho Tenketsu - Chiharu Matsuyama
- 26 November and 3 December: Essay - Masashi Sada
- 12 November and 19 November: Magic Capsule - Godiego
- 22 October, 29 October and 5 November: The Long Run - Eagles.
- 24 September, 1 October and 8 October: Breakfast in America - Supertramp
- 20 August, 27 August, 3 September, 10 September and 17 September: Original Sound Track of Gingatetsudo 999
- 16 July, 23 July, 30 July, 6 August and 13 August: Morning - Satoshi Kishida
- 9 July: Kiss Me Please - Eikichi Yazawa
- 2 July: Alice 7 - Alice

Cash Box

The following reached number 1 on the Cash Box chart:

- 17 February: Soundtrack of "Grease"
- 24 February, 17 March, 24 March and 31 March: Sayiyuki - Godiego
- 21 April and 28 April: Young Man (Y.M.C.A.) - Hideki Saijo
- 26 May and 2 June: Yumekuyo - Masashi Sada
- 9 June and 16 June: Voulez-Vous - ABBA
- 7 July: Soraotobu Torinoy Nookakeru - Chiharu Matsuyama
- 14 July: Alice 7 - Alice
- 21 July, 28 July, 4 August, 11 August, 18 August and 1 September: Morning - Satoshi Kishida
- 15 September and 29 September: Kokyoshi/Gingatetsudo 999 - Godiego
- 6 October: 10 Numbers Carat - Southern All Stars
- 13 October: New Horizon (Japanese: ニューホライズン) - Circus
- 27 October, 3 November and 10 November: Itsuka Sumetayi Amega (Japanese: いつか冷たい雨が) - Iruka
- 1 December: On The Way (Japanese: オン・ザ・ウェイ 〜明日に向って〜) - Satoshi Kishida
- 8 December and 15 December: Zuisoroku - Masashi Sada
- 22 December and 29 December: Kisho Tenketsu - Chiharu Matsuyama

== Annual or year-end charts ==
The song "Omidezake", by Sachiko Kobayashi, was number 1 on The Best Ten annual chart for 1979, announced on 27 December 1979. Jiro Atsumi's Yume Oi Zake was number 1 in the Oricon annual singles chart.

== Radio ==
The program "Mirage Love USA" was broadcast by Tokyo FM. (Cf USA Love Mirage.)

== Film and television ==
The music of Nomugi Pass, by Masaru Sato, won the 34th Mainichi Film Award for Best Music. The music of The Castle of Cagliostro is by Yuji Ohno, and the singer of Hono no Takara Mono (or "Fire Treasure") is Bobby (ボビー).

== Magazines ==
The magazine Oricon Zenkoku Hit Sokuhō (Japanese: オリコン全国ヒット速報) began in August 1979.

== Genres ==
New music songs were number 1 on the Oricon singles chart for most of 1979.

== Music industry ==
The record industry grossed $62 million in January. Average sales for the 1979 Christmas and New Year season were ten percent higher than those of the 1978 Christmas and New Year season, with particularly high sales for ABBA, Saki Kubota, Masashi Sada and Alice.

PolyGram and Young Japan agreed to enter into a partnership.

== Overseas ==
The song "Kiss in the Dark", by Pink Lady, reached number 37 on the Billboard Hot 100 chart in the United States of America. Pink Lady were the first Japanese musicians to enter the record charts in the United States since Kyu Sakamoto in 1963.

Yellow Magic Orchestra did a world tour in October and November 1979.

== Debuts ==
- 25 August: Chage and Aska
- 1 October: Saki Kubota
- Mai Yamane

== Other singles released ==
- Zipangu, Pink Typhoon, Nami Nori Pirates, Monday Mona Lisa Club and Do Your Best by Pink Lady
- Ai no Arashi, Shinayaka ni Utatte and Aizenbashi by Momoe Yamaguchi
- Holy and Bright by Godiego
- Mayonaka no Door - Miki Matsubara
- Ai No Suichuka by Keiko Matsuzaka
- 17 January: Kimi wa Bara yori Utsukushī - Akira Fuse
- 20 January: Ai O Tomenaide by Off Course
- 1 March: Be Silent by Momoe Yamaguchi
- 20 December: Wake Up by "Kazuo Zaitsu"

Foreign music

- Wanted by The Dooleys

== Other albums released ==
- Solid State Survivor by Yellow Magic Orchestra
- Live in Budoukan, Magical Music Tour, Pink Lady and We Are Sexy, by Pink Lady
- A Face in a Vision and L.A. Blue by Momoe Yamaguchi
- Okaerinasai by Miyuki Nakajima
- Casiopea and Super Flight by Casiopea
- In a Model Room by P-Model
- Sneaker Dancer by Yōsui Inoue
- Moonglow by Tatsuro Yamashita
- Make Me a Star by T-Square
- Butterfly by Kimiko Kasai
- 1 December: Kanashii Hodo Otenki by Yuming

== History ==
In 2008, Shūkan Shōwa Taimuzu featured Judy Ongg on the back cover as person of the moment (Japanese: 時の人) for 1979.

== See also ==
- Timeline of Japanese music
- 1979 in Japan
- 1979 in music
- w:ja:1979年の音楽
