= We Are Sexy =

Studio album by Pink Lady
- Released: December 1, 1979
- Recorded: 1978–1979
- Genres: J-pop; disco
- Length: 47:56
- Languages: Japanese; English
- Label: Victor
- Producer: Hisahiko Iida

Pink Lady chronology
Pink Lady (1979)	We Are Sexy (1979)	Turning Point (1980)

We Are Sexy (ウィ・アー・セクシー, Ui Ā Sekushī) is the fifth studio album by Japanese idol duo Pink Lady, released through Victor Entertainment on December 1, 1979. The album contains two medleys, covers, and a Japanese version of their first American hit "Kiss in the Dark". Several of these covers were featured in the duo's U.S. variety show Pink Lady and Jeff.

The album peaked at No. 52 on Oricon's weekly albums chart and sold over 135,000 copies.

== Track listing ==
All music is arranged by Norio Maeda except "Kiss in the Dark" by Kazufumi Ohama.

Side A
No.	Title	Writer(s)	Original artist	Length
1.	"Medley: "MacArthur Park"; "Heaven Knows""	Jimmy Webb; Donna Summer; Giorgio Moroder; Pete Bellotte	Donna Summer	12:23
2.	"Da Ya Think I'm Sexy?"	Fumiko Okada; Rod Stewart; Carmine Appice; Duane Hitchings	Rod Stewart	5:03
3.	"Walk Away Renée"	Michael Brown; Bob Calilli; Tony Sansone	The Left Banke	3:20
4.	"I Was Made for Dancin'"	Okada; Michael Lloyd	Leif Garrett	2:57

Side B
No.	Title	Writer(s)	Original artist	Length
1.	"Star Love"	John Footman; Judy Weider	Cheryl Lynn	5:09
2.	"Medley: "Knock on Wood"; "Boogie Wonderland"; "Hot Stuff"; "Go West""	Eddie Floyd; Steve Cropper; Allee Willis; John Lind; Pete Bellotte; Harold Faltermeyer; Keith Forsey; Jacques Morali; Henri Belolo; Victor Willis	Eddie Floyd; Earth, Wind & Fire; Donna Summer; Village People	10:00
3.	"Kiss in the Dark" (Japanese version)	Okada; Lloyd		3:08
4.	"Last Dance"	Okada; Paul Jabara	Donna Summer	5:54

== Charts ==
Chart (1979)	Peak position
Japan Oricon Albums Chart	52

== See also ==
- 1979 in Japanese music
