= Ai Shōka =

Studio album by Keiko Masuda
- Released: 10 December 2014
- Genre: J-pop; kayōkyoku
- Language: Japanese
- Label: Warner Music Japan

Keiko Masuda chronology
Colors ~ 30th Anniversary All Time Best (2012)	Ai Shōka (2014)	Soshite, Koko kara... (2022)

Ai Shōka (愛唱歌, Love Songs) is a cover album by Japanese singer Keiko Masuda. Released through Warner Music Japan on December 10, 2014, the album features covers of songs that begin with "Ai" (愛, "Love"). It includes two new songs: "Ai Shōka" and "Itoshi Terutte Itte", as well as a new recording of Masuda's 1981 hit song "Suzume".

== Track listing ==
All songs arranged by Akira Masubachi.

No.	Title	Writer(s)	Original artist	Length
1.	"Ai ga Umareta Hi (with Yoshiaki Ohuchi)" ((愛が生まれた日, "The Day When Love Was Born"))	Yasushi Akimoto; Hitoshi Haba	Miwako Fujitani and Yoshiaki Ohuchi
2.	"Ai no Suichūka" ((愛の水中花, "Underwater Flower of Love"))	Hiroyuki Itsuki; Masako Komatsubara	Keiko Matsuzaka
3.	"Ai wa Kagerō" ((愛はかげろう, "Love Is Ridiculous"))	Kazuto Miura	Gamu
4.	"Ai Shōka" ((愛唱歌, "Love Song"))	Yoko Aki; Ryudo Uzaki	[New song]
5.	"Ai no Kurashi" ((愛のくらし, "Living of Love"))	Tommy Children; Tokiko Kato; Alfred Hause	Tokiko Kato
6.	"Aijin" ((愛人, "Mistress"))	Toyohisa Araki; Takashi Miki	Teresa Teng
7.	"Ai no Mama de..." ((愛のままで…, "As Love..."))	Yūhei Hanaoka	Junko Akimoto
8.	"Ai Sansan" ((愛燦燦, "Love Sunshine"))	Kei Ogura	Hibari Misora
9.	"Ai Giri Giri" ((愛・GIRI GIRI, "Last Minute Love"))	Yūichirō Oda; Shizuka Ijūin	Pink Lady
10.	"Itoshi Terutte Itte" ((愛してるって言って, "Say I Love You"))	Keiko Masuda; Hitoshi Haba	[New song]
11.	"Ai no Sanka" ((愛の讃歌, "Hymn of Love"))	Édith Piaf; Tokiko Iwatani; Marguerite Monnot	Fubuki Koshiji
12.	"Suzume" ((すずめ, "Sparrow"))	Miyuki Nakajima	Keiko Masuda
