= Meteor (Pink Lady song) =

Single by Pink Lady
- Language: Japanese
- Released: December 13, 2019
- Genre: J-pop
- Label: Victor
- Songwriter: Nayutalien

Pink Lady singles chronology
| "Terebi ga Kita Hi" (2003) | "Meteor" (2019) |

Music video
- Meteor on YouTube

"Meteor" (メテオ, Meteo) is the 26th single by Japanese duo Pink Lady, released on December 13, 2019. Written by Nayutalien (ナユタン星人, Nayutan Seijin), the song was used as the theme song of the 2019 anime film Yo-kai Watch Jam the Movie: Yo-Kai Academy Y - Can a Cat be a Hero? (映画 妖怪学園Y 猫はHEROになれるか, Eiga Yōkai Gakuen Wai Neko wa Hīrō ni Nareru ka). It was Pink Lady's first new single in over 15 years.

== Background ==
During a press conference at Yomiuri Hall on December 1, 2019, Level-5 founder Akihiro Hino explained that Pink Lady were chosen by Nayutalien to record the song, as the composition was based on songs from the 1970s and 1980s. Hino initially dismissed Nayutalien's proposal as a joke, but he approached the duo as a favor and was surprised that they accepted the offer.

Upon receiving Nayutalien's demo of the song, Mie pointed that it had brass and string arrangements reminiscent of songs composed by longtime Pink Lady songwriter Shunichi Tokura. Keiko Masuda was also impressed with the arrangement, but initially found it difficult to sing due to its wide range and sarcastically stated that "Meteor" may be Pink Lady's final recording. The duo also added some Easter eggs in the film: Moco-chan, a storybook character created by Mie, makes a cameo appearance while Masuda does a voice cameo.

== Music video ==
The official music video was uploaded on Level-5's YouTube channel on December 13, 2019. It features Nayu Kuruhoshi (来星ナユ, Kuruhoshi Nayu), a character based on Nayutalien.

== Track listing ==
All tracks are written and arranged by Nayutalien.

| No. | Title | Length |
|---|---|---|
| 1. | "Meteor" (Meteo (メテオ)) |
