= Suzume (song) =

Single by Keiko Masuda

from the album Hitori ga Suki
- Language: Japanese
- B-side: "Eve"
- Released: November 28, 1981
- Genre: J-pop; kayōkyoku
- Length: 4:28
- Label: Reprise Records
- Songwriter: Miyuki Nakajima

Keiko Masuda singles chronology
"Suzume" (1981)	"Tamerai" (1982)

"Suzume" (すずめ; lit. "Sparrow") is the debut single by Japanese singer Keiko Masuda. Written by Miyuki Nakajima, the single was released on November 28, 1981, eight months after the disbandment of Masuda's group Pink Lady. It peaked at No. 9 on Oricon's singles charts and sold 267,000 copies.

Masuda was inspired to collaborate with Nakajima after listening to Junko Sakurada's 1977 song "Shiawase Shibai" (しあわせ芝居; "Happy Drama"), which was written by Nakajima. "Suzume" marked a musical change for Masuda from Pink Lady's bubblegum disco-pop style to a more contemporary kayōkyoku sound that would define her solo career.

In 1985, Nakajima recorded her version of the song in her self-cover album Oiro Naoshi. Masuda re-recorded the song as "Suzume ~Acoustic Version '05~" (すずめ～アコースティック・バージョン’05～), which was included in her 2008 self-cover album Moichido Asobimasho: Now & Then (もいちど遊びましょNow & Then; Let's Play Again: Now & Then). She also recorded another version of the song in her 2014 cover album Ai Shōka (愛唱歌, Love Songs).

== Track listing (7" vinyl) ==
All tracks arranged by Nozomi Aoki.

No.	Title	Lyrics	Music	Length
1.	"Suzume" ((すずめ; "Sparrow"))	Miyuki Nakajima	Miyuki Nakajima	4:28
2.	"Eve" (Ivu (前夜祭（イヴ）))	Aya Sagan	Jun Horie	3:07

== Charts ==
Chart (1981)	Peak position
Japanese Oricon Singles Chart	9

== Cover versions ==
- Yōko Hatanaka covered the song in her 1982 album Kyōkō Toppa.

== See also ==
- 1981 in Japanese music
