= Uchōten =

Single by B'z

from the album Epic Day
- B-side: "Endless Summer"
- Released: January 14, 2015
- Length: 8:41
- Label: Vermillion Records

B'z singles chronology
"Go for It, Baby (Kioku no Sanmyaku)" (2012)	"Uchōten" (2015)	"Red" (2015)

Music video
- "Uchōten" on YouTube

"Uchōten" (有頂天) "ecstasy", is a single by Japanese rock duo B'z. It was released on January 14, 2015. It is the only single from their nineteenth album Epic Day.

The song debuted at number one on the weekly Oricon Singles Chart, with 133,980 copies sold. It also gave B'z their 64th combined week in the number one position, beating Pink Lady's 1979 record of 63 combined weeks. In addition, the song reached number one on the Billboard Japan Hot 100 and the Top Singles Sales chart. It was ranked number 37 on Oricon's 2015 year-end chart and number 39 on Billboard Japan's. The Recording Industry Association of Japan certified the single Gold for its sales of 100,000 copies.

== Track listing ==
No.	Title	Length
1.	"Uchōten (有頂天)"	4:03
2.	"Endless Summer"	4:38

== Certifications ==
Region	Certification	Certified units/sales
Japan (RIAJ)	Gold	100,000^{^}
^{^} Shipments figures based on certification alone.
