= Pink Lady Legend, Now and Forever =

Compilation album by Various artists
- Released: 26 August 2026
- Recorded: 2026
- Genre: J-pop
- Language: Japanese
- Label: Victor

Various artists chronology
Bad Friends (2009)	Pink Lady Legend, Now and Forever (2026)

Pink Lady Legend, Now and Forever (ピンク・レディー伝説 Now and Forever, Pinku Redī Densetsu Now and Forever) is a tribute album by various artists, released by Victor Entertainment on August 26, 2026, to commemorate the 50th anniversary of the Japanese idol duo Pink Lady. The album features 11 of Pink Lady's hit singles, as covered by artists such as Chisato Moritaka, Maki Watase, Yu Shirota, Meimi Tamura, Kanako Momota, Kazuya Yoshii, Kyoko Koizumi, Koda Kumi, Ua, and more. A two-disc edition includes the original Pink Lady versions of the songs, plus their karaoke versions.

The album peaked at No. 45 on Oricon's Weekly Albums chart.

== Track listing ==
All lyrics are written by Yū Aku; all music is composed by Shunichi Tokura.

Disc 1
No.	Title	Artist(s)	Length
1.	"Pepper Keibu" (Peppā Keibu (ペッパー警部; "Inspector Pepper"))	Chisato Moritaka and Maki Watase
2.	"S.O.S."	Akasaki with H Zettrio
3.	"Carmen '77" (Karumen Nanajū-nana (カルメン '77))	Yu Shirota and Meimi Tamura
4.	"Nagisa no Sindbad" (Nagisa no Shindobaddo (渚のシンドバッド; "Sindbad of the Beach"))	Kanako Momota
5.	"Wanted (Shimei Tehai)" (Uonteddo (Shimei Tehai) (ウォンテッド（指名手配）; "Wanted (Fugitive Warrant)"))	Kazuya Yoshii
6.	"UFO"	Shin Koizumix Productions (Kyoko Koizumi, Kan Takagi, and Kenji Ueda)
7.	"Southpaw" (Sausupō (サウスポー))	Koda Kumi
8.	"Monster" (Monsutā (モンスター))	Ua
9.	"Tōmei Ningen" ((透明人間; "Invisible People"))	Aya Arai and Momoka Ito
10.	"Chameleon Army" (Kamereon Āmī (カメレオン・アーミー))	Airi Suzuki
11.	"Oh!"	Yo Hitoto

Bonus Disc: Pink Lady Best Album
No.	Title	Length
1.	"Pepper Keibu"
2.	"S.O.S."
3.	"Carmen '77"
4.	"Nagisa no Sindbad"
5.	"Wanted (Shimei Tehai)"
6.	"UFO"
7.	"Southpaw"
8.	"Monster"
9.	"Tōmei Ningen"
10.	"Chameleon Army"
11.	"Oh!"
12.	"Pepper Keibu" (Karaoke)
13.	"S.O.S." (Karaoke)
14.	"Carmen '77" (Karaoke)
15.	"Nagisa no Sindbad" (Karaoke)
16.	"Wanted (Shimei Tehai)" (Karaoke)
17.	"UFO" (Karaoke)
18.	"Southpaw" (Karaoke)
19.	"Monster" (Karaoke)
20.	"Tōmei Ningen" (Karaoke)
21.	"Chameleon Army" (Karaoke)
22.	"Oh!" (Karaoke)

== Charts ==
Chart (2026)	Peak position
Japanese Oricon Albums Chart	45
