= Magical Music Tour =

Studio album by Pink Lady
- Released: February 5, 1979
- Recorded: 1978
- Genre: J-pop; kayōkyoku; disco
- Length: 57:28
- Language: Japanese
- Label: Victor
- Producer: Hisahiko Iida

Pink Lady chronology
| UFO/Southpaw (1979) | Magical Music Tour (1979) | Pink Lady (1979) |

Singles from Magical Music Tour
- 1. "Nami Nori Pirates" Released: July 5, 1979

Pink Lady Magical Music Tour (ピンク・レディーの不思議な旅, Pinku Redī no Fushigi na Tabi, lit. Pink Lady's Magical Journey) is the third studio album by Japanese idol duo Pink Lady, released through Victor Entertainment on February 5, 1979. It is a concept album using traveling as a motif.

The album peaked at No. 27 on Oricon's weekly albums chart and sold over 18,000 copies.

== Track listing ==
All lyrics are written by Yū Aku

Side A
| No. | Title | Music | Arrangement | Length |
|---|---|---|---|---|
| 1. | "Opening Theme" (Ōpuningu Tēma (オープニング・テーマ)) | | | 2:58 |
| 2. | "Rio no Joō" ((リオの女王, "Queen of Rio")) | Jun Satō | Satō | 3:24 |
| 3. | "Chinatown" (Chaina Taun (チャイナ・タウン)) | Tatsumi Umegaki | Umegaki | 4:36 |
| 4. | "Kanashiki Sōgen" ((悲しき草原, "Sad Meadows")) | Satō | Satō | 3:46 |
| 5. | "Sora Tobu Jūtan Erotica" (Sora Tobu Jūtan Erochika (空とぶじゅうたんエロチカ, "Magic Carpet Erotica")) | Satō | Satō | 5:27 |
| 6. | "Carmen Shower" (Karumen Shawā (カルメン・シャワー)) | Kōji Makaino | Makaino | 4:04 |
| 7. | "Ren'ai Inshōha" ((恋愛印象派, "Love Impressionist")) | Makaino | Makaino | 3:05 |

Side B
| No. | Title | Music | Arrangement | Length |
|---|---|---|---|---|
| 1. | "Nami Nori Pirates" (Nami Nori Pairētsu (波乗りパイレーツ, "Surfing Pirates")) | Shunichi Tokura | Paul Fauerso | 4:41 |
| 2. | "Nile no Akai Tsuki" (Nairu no Akai Tsuki (ナイルの赤い月, "Red Moon of the Nile")) | Makoto Kawaguchi | Kawaguchi | 4:49 |
| 3. | "Onna wa Shōbu Suru" ("A Woman Fights" (女は勝負する)) | Tsunehiro Izumi | Izumi | 3:53 |
| 4. | "Oriental Feeling" (Orientaru Fīringu (オリエンタル・フィーリング)) | Izumi | Izumi | 4:39 |
| 5. | "Minami-tai Heiyō" ((南太平洋, "South Pacific")) | Izumi | Izumi | 3:41 |
| 6. | "Wakusei Honeymoon" (Wakusei Hanīmūn (惑星ハネムーン, "Interstellar Honeymoon")) | Kawaguchi | Kawaguchi | 4:45 |
| 7. | "Ending Theme" (Endingu Tēma (エンディング・テーマ)) | | | 3:41 |

== Charts ==
| Chart (1979) | Peak position |
|---|---|
| Japanese Oricon Albums Chart | 27 |

== See also ==
- 1979 in Japanese music
