= Don't Wanna Lie =

Single

Single by B'z

from the album C'mon
- Released: June 1, 2011
- Genre: Hard rock, blues rock, pop
- Length: 4:05
- Label: Vermillion Records
- Songwriter(s): Koshi Inaba, Tak Matsumoto
- Producer(s): Tak Matsumoto

B'z singles chronology
"Sayonara Kizu Darake no Hibi yo" (2011)	"Don't Wanna Lie" (2011)	"Go for It, Baby (Kioku no Sanmyaku)" (2012)

"Don't Wanna Lie" is the 49th single for the Japanese rock duo B'z, and the second single to be released from their 2011 album C'mon. It was released on June 1, 2011. The song debuted at number one on the Oricon Singles Chart, with first week sales of 160,000 copies. It also reached number two on the Billboard Japan Hot 100 and number one the Top Singles Sales chart. It is their 45th consecutive number one single, and sold 216,000 copies, becoming the 28th best selling single of 2011. The Recording Industry Association of Japan certified the single Platinum for its sales of 250,000 copies. This song is used as the ending theme in Detective Conan's 15th feature film Quarter of Silence. It was also used as opening theme for episodes 613 to 626 of the TV series.

== Certifications ==
Region	Certification	Certified units/sales
Japan (RIAJ)	Gold	100,000^{^}
^{^} Shipments figures based on certification alone.
