= Pink lady (medicine) =

Drug combination used to treat gastroesophageal reflux

In medicine, pink lady is a term used for a combination of medications used to treat gastroesophageal reflux or gastritis. It usually consists of an antacid and the anaesthetic lidocaine. Some variants contain an anticholinergic. The name of the preparation comes from its colour – pink.

Pink ladies often relieve symptoms for gastro-esophageal reflux disease (GERD). However, they are generally believed to be insufficient to diagnose GERD and rule-out other causes of chest pain and/or abdominal pain such as myocardial infarction (heart attack).

The pink lady is the de facto term describing xylocaine viscous and a liquid antacid given by mouth to treat emergency department patients and help determine if the chest pains are either heart or digestive related. If esophageal symptoms subside the treatment may indicate the symptoms are non-cardiac.

== See also ==
- Pink lady (cocktail)
