= C'mon (B'z album) =

Studio album by B'z
- Released: July 27, 2011
- Recorded: 2010–2011
- Genre: Hard rock; pop rock
- Length: 51:54
- Label: Vermillion Records
- Producer: Tak Matsumoto

B'z chronology
Magic (2009)	C'mon (2011)	Epic Day (2015)

Singles from C'mon
- 1. "Sayonara Kizu Darake no Hibi yo" Released: April 13, 2011; 2. "Don't Wanna Lie" Released: June 1, 2011

C'mon is the eighteenth studio album by the Japanese rock duo B'z. It was released on July 27, 2011.

It debuted at the #1 spot on the Japanese Oricon music charts, and by the end of its first week of sales, the album had sold 272,000 copies. It also reached No. 1 at the Billboard Japan Top Albums.

In addition, sales of C'mon pushed the duo's total record sales to over 80 million albums and singles, a first in Japanese music history.

Two versions of C'mon were released: a CD-only version, and a limited-edition version which also includes a DVD featuring promotional music video clips for "Sayonara Kizu Darake no Hibi yo," "Don't Wanna Lie," and the album's title track.

== Track listing ==
All lyrics written by Koshi Inaba, all music composed by Tak Matsumoto alongside arrangement by Koshi Inaba, Tak Matsumoto, and Hideyuki Terachi.

No.	Title	Length
1.	"C'mon"	4:16
2.	"Sayonara Kizu Darake no Hibi yo (Goodbye days full of scratches さよなら傷だらけの日々よ)"	3:41
3.	"Hitoshizuku no Anata (Your one drop ひとしずくのアナタ)"	3:43
4.	"Homebound"	4:11
5.	"Don't Wanna Lie"	4:05
6.	"DAREKA "	3:31
7.	"Boss (ボス)"	4:07
8.	"Too Young"	3:42
9.	"Pilgrim (ピルグリム)"	3:59
10.	"The Meister (ザ・マイスター)"	3:43
11.	"Dead End (デッドエンド)"	3:45
12.	"Meimei (Naming 命名)"	5:19
13.	"ultra soul 2011"	3:49

== Certifications ==
Region	Certification	Certified units/sales
Japan (RIAJ)	Platinum	250,000^{^}
^{^} Shipments figures based on certification alone.
