= Pink Lady (1979 album) =

Studio album by Pink Lady
- Released: June 1, 1979 (U.S.); September 5, 1979 (Japan)
- Recorded: 1978
- Genres: Disco; pop
- Length: 30:49
- Labels: Elektra Records (U.S.); Victor (Japan)
- Producer: Michael Lloyd

Pink Lady chronology
Magical Music Tour (1979)	Pink Lady (1979)	We Are Sexy (1979)

Singles from Pink Lady
- 1. "Kiss in the Dark" Released: May 1, 1979 (U.S.) September 5, 1979 (Japan); 2. "Dancing in the Halls of Love" Released: August 1979 (U.S.)

Pink Lady (also known in Japan as Pink Lady in the USA (ピンク・レディー・イン・USA, Pinku Redī in Yū Esu Ē)) is the fourth studio album by Japanese idol duo Pink Lady, released through Victor Entertainment on September 5, 1979, and through Elektra Records as their U.S. debut album on June 1, 1979. It was the duo's first and only English-language album, consisting of three original tracks. The lead single "Kiss in the Dark" peaked at No. 37 on the Billboard Top 40 and at No. 19 on Oricon's weekly singles chart.

The album peaked at No. 30 on Oricon's weekly albums chart and sold over 17,000 copies. It also reached No. 205 on Billboard's "Bubbling Under Top LPs" chart.

== Track listing ==
All music is arranged by John D'Andrea except "Walk Away Renée" by Erich Bulling.

Side A
No.	Title	Writer(s)	Original artist	Length
1.	"Kiss in the Dark"	Michael Lloyd		2:54
2.	"Dancing in the Halls of Love"	Billy Alessi; Bobby Alessi	Alessi Brothers	3:22
3.	"Show Me the Way to Love"	Lloyd		3:22
4.	"Walk Away Renée"	Mike Brown; Bob Calilli; Tony Sansone	The Left Banke	3:03
5.	"Strangers When We Kiss"	Lloyd		3:28

Side B
No.	Title	Writer(s)	Original artist	Length
1.	"Love Me Tonight"	Barry Mason; Mario Panzeri; Lorenzo Pilat	Tom Jones	3:05
2.	"I Want to Give You My Everything"	Larry Weiss	Carl Douglas	2:14
3.	"Deeply (From the motion picture Happy)"	Norman Gimbel	Anson Williams	2:15
4.	"Give Me Your Love"	Bob Gundry	Leslie and Kelly	3:18
5.	"Love Countdown"	Detlef Petersen; James Hopkins; James Harrison; Geoffey Peacey	Luan Peters	3:48

== Charts ==
Chart (1979)	Peak position
Japanese Oricon Albums Chart	30
US Bubbling Under Top LPs	205

== See also ==
- 1979 in Japanese music
