= Keiko Masuda =

Japanese pop singer and actress (born 1957)

- 増田 恵子
- Born: Keiko Kobayashi (小林 啓子); September 2, 1957 (age 68); Aoi-ku, Shizuoka, Japan
- Other name: Kei (ケイ); 増田けい子; kéi
- Occupations: Singer-songwriter; actress
- Agent: Kei-Office
- Spouse: Tomoji Kuwaki (m. 2002; died 2024)
- Musical career
- Genres: J-pop; kayōkyoku; jazz
- Instrument: Vocals
- Years active: 1976–present
- Label: Reprise Records (1981–1982); For Life Music (1984–1985); Bourbon Records (1989–1990); Universal Music (2005); King Records (2008); Warner Music Japan (2012–2014); Nippon Columbia (2018); Victor (2022–present)

Japanese name
- Kanji: 増田 恵子
- Hiragana: ますだ けいこ
- Katakana: マスダ ケイコ
Transcriptions
- Romanization: Masuda Keiko
- Website: www.kei-office.net

Keiko Masuda (増田 恵子, Masuda Keiko) (born Keiko Kobayashi (小林 啓子, Kobayashi Keiko) on September 2, 1957, in Shizuoka, Japan) is a Japanese pop singer and actress. She is better known by her nickname Kei, and is one half of Pink Lady, the top idol group in Japan in the 1970s. In the United States, they are known for their self-titled TV program. Masuda is represented by her own management firm Kei-Office (ケイ・オフィス, Kei Ofisu).

== Biography ==
=== Early life ===
Keiko Kobayashi was the second daughter of Shōhei and Fusae Kobayashi. After her father was killed in a vehicular accident on April 14, 1961, she was adopted by the Masuda family (from her mother's side) and moved to Yaizu. In 1972, a year after transferring to Suehiro Junior High School, Masuda met Mitsuyo Nemoto. A year later, they attended Tokoha University and the Yamaha Music School in Hamamatsu. In May 1974, the duo formed a folk group called "Cookie" (クッキー, Kukkī) and passed Yamaha's "Challenge on Stage" (チャレンジ・オン・ステージ, Charenji on Sutēji) audition.

=== Pink Lady ===
After winning an audition on the talent show Star Tanjō! in March 1976, Masuda and Nemoto signed with Victor Entertainment and became Pink Lady. Masuda became "Kei" (ケイ) while Nemoto took the stage name "Mie" (ミー, Mī). After their debut single "Pepper Keibu" peaked at No. 4 on Oricon's singles charts in August 1976, Pink Lady's second single "S.O.S." reached No. 1, beginning a nine-song streak of No. 1 hits from November 1976 to December 1978. Their biggest single was "UFO" which spent 10 weeks at No. 1 and sold over 1.55 million copies.

When their popularity took a downturn in 1979, Pink Lady turned their focus on the United States, with their first U.S. single "Kiss in the Dark" reaching No. 37 on the Billboard Hot 100 and becoming the first Japanese recording act to chart in America since Kyu Sakamoto in 1963. In 1980, the duo starred with comedian Jeff Altman in the NBC variety show Pink Lady and Jeff. The show was plagued by the language barrier between the duo and the production crew. Poor ratings and scathing reviews resulted in Pink Lady and Jeff being cancelled after five episodes, with a sixth episode remaining unaired.

Following the failure of Pink Lady and Jeff, as well as the decline of disco music, Pink Lady held a press conference on September 1, 1980, to announce their disbandment within six months. During the press conference, Kei stated that she would revert to her real name for her solo career. Pink Lady performed their final concert at Korakuen Stadium on March 31, 1981, before going their separate ways. Mie and Kei have since reunited several times to record new songs and perform special concerts.

=== Solo career ===
Following Pink Lady's disbandment, Masuda signed with Reprise Records and released her first solo single "Suzume" (すずめ; "Sparrow") on November 28, 1981. Written by Miyuki Nakajima, the song made it to No. 9 on Oricon's singles chart and sold 267,000 copies. In contrast to Pink Lady and Mie's pop style, Masuda's solo efforts focused on more traditional kayōkyoku with her uniquely deep voice. "Suzume" was followed by "Tamerai" (ためらい; "Friends in Love") (written by Yumi Matsutoya), "Rasen Kaidan" (らせん階段; "Spiral Staircase") (written by Mariya Takeuchi), and "Joyū" (女優; "Actress") (written by Keisuke Kuwata).

Masuda put her solo career on hiatus in 1986, but in 1989, she made her debut in France with the album Simples Confidences, which consisted of six French-language and four English-language songs. The album was released in Japan as Voice Cologne. During this time, Masuda used the stage name "kéi" as a singer while retaining her real name as an actress. She also released her gravure book C'est un Amour ― Keiko Masuda Photo Album (セタナムール―増田恵子写真集, Setanamūru ― Masuda Keiko Shashin-shū) in 1990.

In 2001, Masuda starred as Vi Moore in the Japanese adaptation of the Footloose stage musical. The production also featured her Pink Lady partner Mie as Ethel McCormack.

In September 2004, Masuda released her autobiography Akogare (あこがれ; Longing). A year later, she released "Kiseki no Hana" (奇蹟の花; "Miracle Flower"), her first single in 15 years. In 2008, Masuda released Moichido Asobimasho: Now & Then (もいちど遊びましょNow & Then; Let's Play Again: Now & Then), her first solo album in 19 years. The album features self-covers of her solo singles and the Pink Lady hit songs "UFO" and "Nagisa no Sindbad".

On February 21, 2018, Masuda released the single "Saigo no Koi" (最後の恋; "Last Love")/"Fujisan da" (富士山だ; "It's Mount Fuji"), 13 years after her last single. The songs were composed by Tokiko Kato and Yū Aku, and previously recorded by Kato.

In 2019, Masuda starred as Julietta in the stage musical Tom and Jerry: Purr-Chance to Dream (トムとジェリー 夢よもう一度, Tomu to Jerī Yume yo Mōichido).

In April 2022, Masuda released the single "Del Sole" to commemorate the 40th anniversary of her solo career. She also announced the release of the compilation album Soshite, Koko kara..., which will include her past singles and five new recordings, plus the recording of her 40th anniversary concert in November 2021. The limited edition release of the album will include a DVD of the concert.

== Personal life ==
In 1979, Masuda had a publicized relationship with singer Goro Noguchi. This affair put a strain between her and Pink Lady's management T&C Music, who forbade the relationship, especially when the duo were preparing to work in the U.S. Eventually, Masuda's engagement to Noguchi led to Pink Lady's disbandment two years later. The relationship was dissolved in 1984 when Noguchi had an affair with actress Keiko Saito.

On June 23, 2002, Masuda married Tomoji Kuwaki (桑木 知二, Kuwaki Tomoji), president of the sound production company Guild Japan (ギルド・ジャパン, Girudo Japan). Kuwaki died from pancreatic cancer on August 21, 2024.

=== Health issues ===
On December 16, 1977, Masuda collapsed backstage after a Pink Lady show. She was rushed to the hospital, where doctors discovered that she had a burst appendix. Following the surgery, she went against doctors' orders and continued to perform by wrapping her midsection with plastic wrap to keep the stitches closed and prevent any pus from ruining her costumes.

Masuda suffers from Graves' disease. In an interview with Yomiuri Shimbun, she first felt the symptoms of the disease in 1990 and temporarily stepped away from her singing and acting career when her tremors and sudden weight loss became evident. She revealed that her elder sister also has Graves' disease. Masuda struggled with a swollen thyroid during Pink Lady's 2003 tour; despite concerns from fans, she refused to conceal her neck. She has since kept her condition stable with proper treatment.

In 2013, Masuda revealed that she also has Ménière's disease. She said that she experienced sudden hearing loss during her late 20s and was diagnosed with the disease in 2010 when she started developing the same symptoms.

== Discography ==
=== Studio albums ===
Year	Information	Oricon weekly peak position	Sales	RIAJ certification
1982	Hitori ga Suki: Released: February 18, 1982; Label: Reprise Records; Formats: LP, cassette	—		
1982	Koisuru wo Tomodachi: Released: November 10, 1982; Label: Reprise Records; Formats: LP, cassette	—		
1985	Tawamureru Sakanatachi: Released: May 20, 1985; Label: For Life Music; Formats: LP, CD, cassette	—		
1989	Voice Cologne: Released: November 25, 1989; Label: Bourbon Records; Formats: CD, cassette	—		

=== International releases ===
Year	Information	SNEP weekly peak position	Sales	Certification
1989	Simples Confidences: Released: 1989; Label: Mazères Disques; Formats: CD, cassette	—		

=== Compilation albums ===
Year	Information	Oricon weekly peak position	Sales	RIAJ certification
2005	Kyūkoku no Best!: Released: July 27, 2005; Label: Warner Music Japan; Formats: CD	—		
2012	Colors ~ 30th Anniversary All Time Best: Released: November 7, 2012; Label: Warner Music Japan; Formats: 2CD, digital	298		
2022	Soshite, Koko kara...: Released: July 27, 2022; Label: Victor; Formats: 2CD, 2CD+DVD, digital	118		

=== Cover albums ===
Year	Information	Oricon weekly peak position	Sales	RIAJ certification
2008	Moichido Asobimasho: Now & Then: Released: September 1, 2008; Label: King Records; Formats: CD	—		
2014	Ai Shōka: Released: December 10, 2014; Label: Warner Music Japan; Formats: CD	—		

=== Singles ===
List of singles, with selected chart positions
Title	Date	Peak chart positions	Sales (JPN)	RIAJ certification	Album
Title	Date	Oricon Singles Charts	Sales (JPN)	RIAJ certification	Album
"Suzume"	November 28, 1981	9	267,000	Gold	Hitori ga Suki
"Tamerai"	June 12, 1982	37	50,000	N/A	Koisuru wo Tomodachi
"Rasen Kaidan"	October 9, 1982	70	8,000	N/A	Koisuru wo Tomodachi
"Joyū"	May 21, 1984	58	31,000	N/A	Tawamureru Sakanatachi
"FU・RI・NE"	August 21, 1985	63	19,000	N/A	Tawamureru Sakanatachi
"Aiiro no Inshō - Avec le Feu"	October 25, 1989	—			Voice Cologne
"Unmei ga Kawaru Asa"	October 25, 1990	—			Voice Cologne
"Kiseki no Hana"	December 7, 2005	147			Non-album single
"Saigo no Koi"/"Fujisan da"	February 21, 2018	—			Non-album single
"Del Sole"	April 27, 2022	—			Soshite, Koko kara...
"Et j'aime la vie ~ Ima ga Suki"	May 25, 2022	—			Soshite, Koko kara...
"—" denotes releases that did not chart.

== Bibliography ==
- C'est un Amour ― Keiko Masuda Photo Album (セタナムール―増田恵子写真集, Setanamūru ― Masuda Keiko Shashin-shū) (Wani Books, 1990 October)
- Akogare (あこがれ; Longing) (Gentosha, 2004 September)
