= Sayonara Kizu Darake no Hibi yo =

Single by B'z

from the album C'mon
- Released: April 13, 2011
- Genre: Hard rock
- Length: 3:41
- Label: Vermillion Records
- Songwriters: Koshi Inaba, Tak Matsumoto
- Producer: Tak Matsumoto

B'z singles chronology
"My Lonely Town" (2009)	"Sayonara Kizu Darake no Hibi yo" (2011)	"Don't Wanna Lie" (2011)

"Sayonara Kizu Darake no Hibi yo" (さよなら傷だらけの日々よ, lit. "Goodbye Badly Injured Days") is the song and forty-eighth single by Japanese hard rock band, B'z, released on April 13, 2011. It was the first single from their 2011 album, C'mon. The song is written and used for a commercial song of Pepsi NEX. Also the song was first performed on Music Station "Three Hours Special" on April 1, 2011, along with the song "Brotherhood". Limited edition includes DVD with the music video for the song. The song debuted at number 1 on the Oricon Singles Chart, and became the 44th number-one-single by B'z on Japanese Singles Chart. It sold 176,000 copies, becoming the 44th best selling single of that year. It also reached number one on the Billboard Japan Hot 100 and the Top Singles Sales chart. In April, the RIAJ certified the single as Gold.

Although original release date was March 30, 2011, it was postponed because of the 2011 Tōhoku earthquake and tsunami.

== Track listing ==
1. "Sayonara Kizu Darake no Hibi yo" - 3:43
2. "Dawn Runner" - 3:05

== Certifications ==
Region	Certification	Certified units/sales
Japan (RIAJ)	Gold	100,000^{^}
^{^} Shipments figures based on certification alone.
