= Pink Lady (TV series) =

- Also known as: Pink Lady Starring Mie and Kei with Jeff Altman; Pink Lady and Jeff
- Genre: Variety
- Directed by: Art Fisher
- Starring: Pink Lady; Jeff Altman; Jim Varney; Anna Mathias; Cheri Steinkellner; Ed Nakamoto
- Country of origin: United States
- Original language: English
- No. of seasons: 1
- No. of episodes: 6 (1 unaired)

Production
- Producer: Sid and Marty Krofft
- Running time: 45–48 min
- Production company: Krofft Entertainment

Original release
- Network: NBC
- Release: March 1 – April 4, 1980

Pink Lady is an American variety show that aired for five weeks on NBC in 1980, starring the Japanese musical duo of the same name. The show is also referred to by the title Pink Lady and Jeff, referring to co-star Jeff Altman. The show was riddled with complications, including a dispute over the title: agents for the starring parties were never able to settle on one, and the show was advertised both ways during its run. Other difficulties included scriptwriting disagreements, guest star booking mishaps, taping and touring conflicts, and the inability of Mie and Kei, the members of Pink Lady, to understand or speak English.

Pink Lady was massively popular in Japan and even enjoyed a hit in the U.S. with the English-language song "Kiss in the Dark". A television show for the duo was proposed and swiftly approved. The show's developers, Sid and Marty Krofft, pursued the project under the erroneous assumption that the stars spoke both English and Japanese. When the reality became apparent, network executives insisted that Mie and Kei not only perform their English dialog phonetically, but also sing in English. The resulting clumsy diction compounded the show's other problems, and despite the infusion of expensive co-stars, the series did poorly and was cancelled after five episodes.

== Synopsis ==
The series starred Japanese female singing duo Pink Lady, composed of "Mie" (Mitsuyo Nemoto) and "Kei" (Keiko Masuda), and American comedian Jeff Altman. The format of the show featured musical numbers alternating with sketch comedy. A running gag of the series was the girls' lack of understanding of American culture and of English; in reality, Pink Lady spoke no English at all. On the show, Jeff attempted to translate and explain, leading to more confusion.

The series featured Pink Lady performing songs, usually English-language disco and pop songs such as "Boogie Wonderland" or "Yesterday", and interaction with celebrity and musical guests. The group would end the show by jumping into a hot tub together. After the poorly rated series premiere, NBC moved Pink Lady to Friday nights and added Jim Varney as a character actor. The move and retooling failed to help ratings and the series was canceled after five episodes.

== Production ==
The show was the brainchild of Fred Silverman, then president and CEO of NBC, who wanted to replicate the success he had had at ABC and CBS. After seeing a Walter Cronkite story about Pink Lady on the CBS Evening News, Silverman thought their Japanese success could be translated to the American market, so he brought in Sid and Marty Krofft to produce a variety show for them. At the time, Pink Lady had recently achieved their first and only top-40 hit on the U.S. Billboard Hot 100, when their song "Kiss in the Dark" peaked at no. 37 in August 1979. The Krofft brothers were told that the ladies were fluent in English, which they were not. Unsure of how to stage the show, Sid Krofft developed the concept of making "the strangest thing that's ever been on television...The whole show was gonna come out of a little Japanese box." Silverman's response was, "No, that's just too different. Let's just do Donny & Marie."

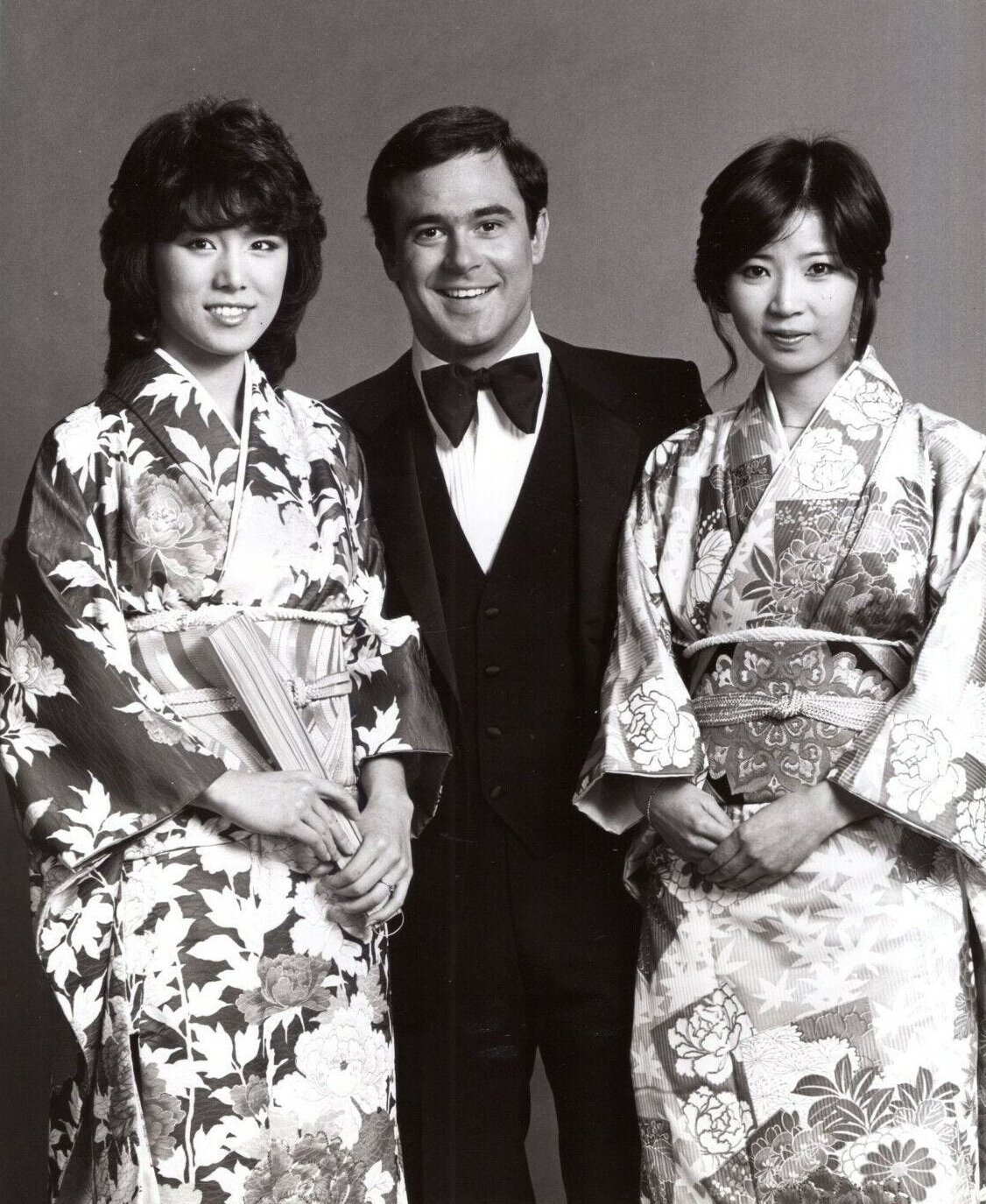
Pink Lady and host Jeff Altman in a promotional photo

Comedian Jeff Altman had a contract with NBC, and on that basis, was offered work hosting the show to compensate for the leads having no knowledge of English. Writer Mark Evanier previously worked with the Kroffts on The Krofft Superstar Hour and the pilot Bobby Vinton's Rock 'n' Rollers and was brought on board as head writer, and seasoned variety show director Art Fisher (The Sonny & Cher Comedy Hour) was brought in to direct. According to Evanier, Fisher disliked the show and only participated because he was contractually obligated.

The language barrier proved to be the biggest obstacle. Mie and Kei had to hold English conversations using an on-set translator. The writers struggled because once dialogue had been written for and learned by the ladies, it could not be changed. This was particularly problematic when a guest star would be booked at the last minute, such as Lorne Greene, who agreed to appear on the show only four hours before the episode was taped. Mie and Kei wanted to sing the songs that had made them famous in their native country, but NBC insisted they perform in English. This resulted in recording English songs phonetically and lip-syncing for the show's taping. Lip-syncing was already a common practice on American variety shows, but it was especially noticeable since the ladies were performing in a language that was foreign to them. Additional problems were caused when the network insisted the writers develop separate identities for Mie and Kei. The established Pink Lady act was so fixed in unison that they performed as one entity, so the two were not comfortable having separate stage personalities.

Because Mie and Kei commuted between the U.S. and Japan to appear in sold-out concerts, their time on the set was spent memorizing lines and routines, forcing the brunt of the comedy on Altman and ensemble players Jim Varney, Cheri Steinkellner and Anna Mathias. On the rare occasions when Mie and Kei appeared in sketches, their time was minimal.

Booking guests for the show was also a problem. Variety shows were fading by 1980, which was exacerbated by the fact the series' headliners were not a household name in the U.S. Larry Hagman and other A-list stars were coerced into appearing by offering sizable monetary incentives. Other stars who had previously worked with the Kroffts were also brought in, including Florence Henderson (The Brady Bunch Hour), Donny Osmond (Donny & Marie), Red Buttons (Side Show) and Bobby Vinton (Bobby Vinton's Rock 'n' Rollers). To ease the need for live, in-person performances, Pink Lady incorporated pre-recorded music videos in lieu of musical acts. Alice Cooper was friends with the Kroffts and submitted an original performance from his upcoming album as a favor to them. Cheap Trick's music video for "Dream Police" was shown as were Blondie's videos for "Shayla" and "Eat to the Beat," both shot for a then-newly released home video.

Each show ended with a tuxedo-clad Jeff getting lured, pushed or pulled into the on-set hot tub by Mie and Kei. This gag originated with Sid Krofft, who had used a similar device on The Brady Bunch Hour; in each episode, Greg would push Peter into the swimming pool. Altman felt it would have been an amusing one-time gag, but by employing it each week, it became contrived. Altman tried to convince the writing staff to do away with this segment, but he was vetoed, likely because the segment afforded everyone the opportunity to see Mie and Kei in bikinis.

The show's title was a source of confusion. The onscreen title was Pink Lady, but the series was commonly referred to as Pink Lady and Jeff. Altman felt that since he carried the show, his name should appear in the title, and the network agreed, but Pink Lady's manager strongly protested and threatened a lawsuit if "and Jeff" appeared in the title. NBC's promos occasionally referred to the show as Pink Lady, whereas at other times the voice-over announcer referred to it as Pink Lady and Jeff. In print advertisements for TV Guide the show was always titled Pink Lady and Jeff, though it was cited as Pink Lady in the text TV listings.

== Episodes ==
No.	Title	Directed by	Written by	Original release date
1	"Episode 1"	Art Fisher	Mark Evanier, Rowby Goren, Lorne Frohman, Jim Brochu, Paul Pompian, Stephen Spears, Biff Manard	March 1, 1980
Guest stars: Bert Parks, Sherman Hemsley, and Blondie Music: "Boogie Wonderland" performed by Pink Lady; "Turn Up the Radio" performed by Pink Lady; "Stop! In the Name of Love" performed by Pink Lady; "Get Ready"; "Boogie Woogie Bugle Babe" performed by Chorus; "Hooray for Hollywood" performed by Chorus; "Movies Were Movies" performed by Bert Parks; "Shayla" performed by Blondie (music video); "You've Got a Friend" performed by Pink Lady; "Don't Stop" performed by Pink Lady; "Knock on Wood" performed by Pink Lady
2	"Episode 2"	Art Fisher	Mark Evanier, Rowby Goren, Lorne Frohman, Jim Brochu, Paul Pompian, Stephen Spears, Biff Manard	March 14, 1980
Guest stars: Larry Hagman, Sid Caesar, Donny Osmond and Teddy Pendergrass Music: "Ease On down the Road" performed by Pink Lady; "Turn Up the Radio" performed by Pink Lady; "Heaven Knows" performed by Donny Osmond & Pink Lady; "I'll Never Love This Way Again" performed by Donny Osmond; "We Are Family" performed by Donny Osmond & Pink Lady; "Close the Door" performed by Teddy Pendergrass; "Do Me" performed by Teddy Pendergrass; "New York, New York (On the Town)" performed by the Chorus; "Forty-Second Street" performed by Donny Osmond & Pink Lady; "On Broadway" performed by Teddy Pendergrass & Pink Lady
3	"Episode 3"	Art Fisher	Mark Evanier, Rowby Goren, Lorne Frohman, Jim Brochu, Paul Pompian, Stephen Spears, Biff Manard	March 21, 1980
Guest stars: Greg Evigan, Hugh Hefner, and Cheap Trick Music: "U.F.O." performed by Pink Lady; "We Have No Unleaded" performed by the Chorus; "People I Know I Wanna Be Around" performed by Greg Evigan; "Cheapshot Magazine" performed by the Chorus; "You Needed Me" performed by Pink Lady; "Don't Go Breaking My Heart" performed by Greg Evigan & Pink Lady; "Last Dance" performed by Greg Evigan & Pink Lady; "Dream Police" performed by Cheap Trick (music video); "Chicago (That Toddlin' Town)" performed by the Chorus; "My Kind of Town" performed by Hugh Hefner
4	"Episode 4"	Art Fisher	Mark Evanier, Rowby Goren, Lorne Frohman, Jim Brochu, Paul Pompian, Stephen Spears, Biff Manard	March 28, 1980
Guest stars: Lorne Greene, Sid Caesar, Florence Henderson and Blondie Music: "You Keep Me Hangin' On" performed by Pink Lady; "Turn Up the Music" performed by Pink Lady; "Yesterday" performed by Pink Lady; "Eat to the Beat" performed by Blondie (music video); "My Old Kentucky Home"/"Back Home Again in Indiana"/"America the Beautiful" performed by Florence Henderson; "How Deep Is Your Love"/"Shame"/"Le Freak" performed by Pink Lady
5	"Episode 5"	Art Fisher	Mark Evanier, Rowby Goren, Lorne Frohman, Jim Brochu, Paul Pompian, Stephen Spears, Biff Manard, Jerry Lewis	April 4, 1980
Guest stars: Jerry Lewis, Red Buttons, and Alice Cooper Music: "Monster" performed by Pink Lady; "Cheapshot Magazine" performed by the Chorus; "Old Abe Lincoln" performed by the Chorus; "MacArthur Park" performed by Pink Lady; "Clones (We're All)" performed by Alice Cooper; "Da Ya Think I'm Sexy?"/"Dancing Queen"/"If My Friends Could See Me Now" performed by Pink Lady
6	"Episode 6"	Art Fisher	Mark Evanier, Rowby Goren, Lorne Frohman, Jim Brochu, Paul Pompian, Stephen Spears, Biff Manard	Unaired
Guest stars: Roy Orbison, Bobby Vinton, Sid Caesar and Byron Allen Music: "I Can't Help Myself (Sugar Pie Honey Bunch)" performed by Pink Lady; "Roses Are Red (My Love)"/"Blue on Blue"/"I Love How You Love Me"/"Sealed with a Kiss"/"Blue Velvet" (medley) performed by Bobby Vinton; "Oh, Pretty Woman" performed by Roy Orbison; "Mr. Lonely" performed by Jeff Altman; "Crazy Little Thing Called Love" performed by Pink Lady; "Him"/"Johnny B. Goode" (medley) performed by Bobby Vinton & Pink Lady; "Blue on Blue" performed by Jeff Altman & Bobby Vinton

== Syndication ==
Pink Lady and Jeff reruns were seen on Trio for a brief period.

== Home video ==
On June 26, 2001, Rhino Entertainment released the complete series on Region 1 DVD in the United States.

== Reception ==
The series ranked #35 on TV Guide's "The 50 Worst TV Shows of All Time" list in 2002. In 1998, Hal Erickson said that the series was not close to being worst.

Evan Chung praised Pink Lady's performances of their songs "UFO" and "Monster" in episodes 3 and 5, describing them as highlights. David Hofstede praised Teddy Pendergrass' performance of the song "On Broadway" in episode 2. David Inman praised the Sid Ceasar comedy sketch in that episode.

== In popular culture ==
Harry Shearer appeared as Carl Sagan on Saturday Night Live's spoof "Pink Lady and Carl" with Gilda Radner and Laraine Newman playing the singing duo and Paul Shaffer as special guest star Marvin Hamlisch.
