= Pink lady (cocktail) =

Classic gin-based cocktail

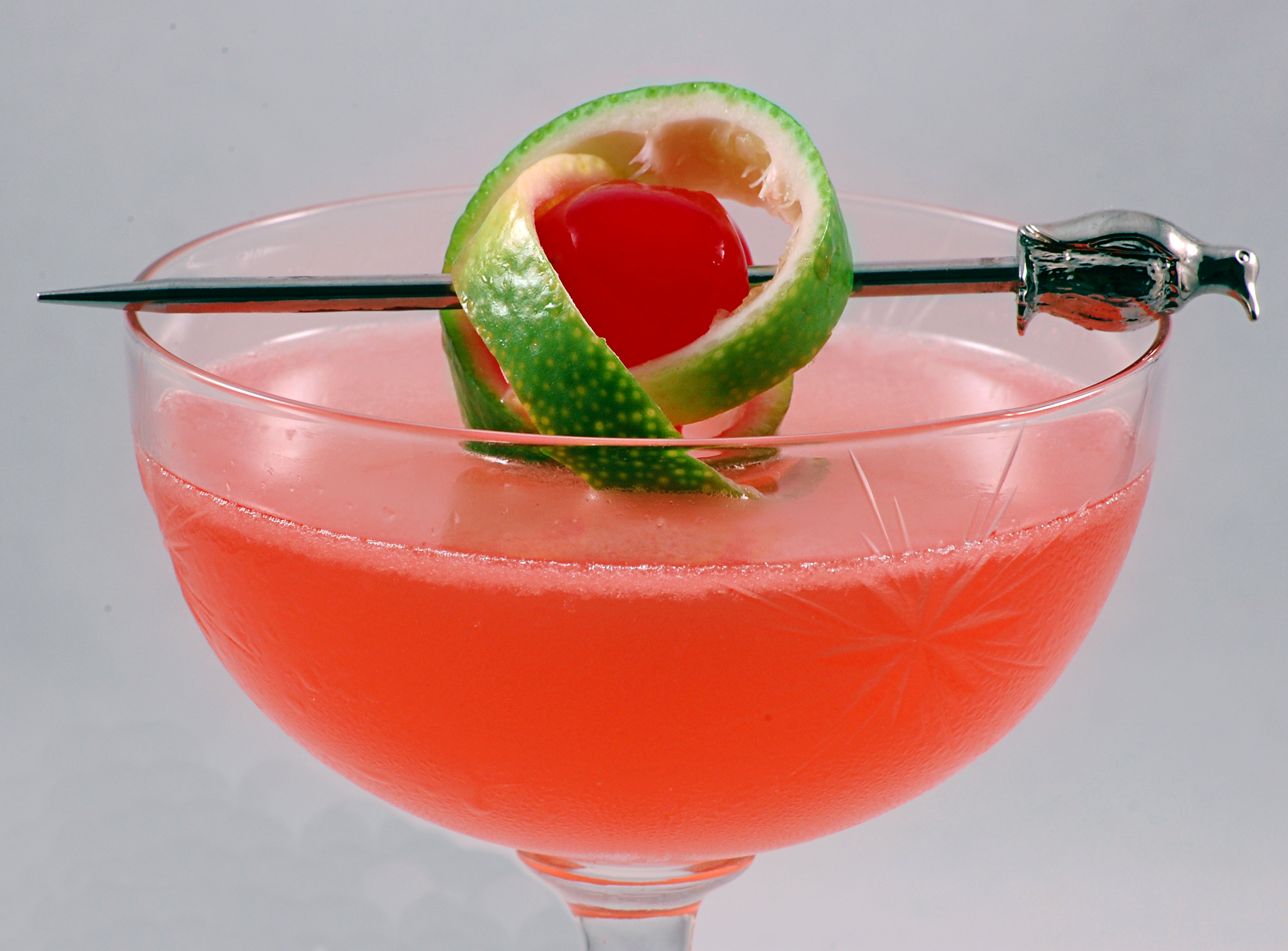
- Type: Cocktail
- Ingredients: 1 oz gin; 4 dashes grenadine; 1 egg white
- Base spirit: Gin
- Standard drinkware: Cocktail glass
- Standard garnish: Cherry
- Served: Straight up: chilled, without ice
- Preparation: Shake ingredients very well with ice and strain into cocktail glass. Garnish with a cherry.

The pink lady is a classic gin-based cocktail with a long history. Its pink color comes from grenadine.

== Basic recipe and variations ==
The exact ingredients for the pink lady vary, but all variations have the use of gin, grenadine, and egg white in common. In its most basic form, the pink lady consists of just those three ingredients. According to the Cafe Royal Cocktail Book of 1937, it is made with a glass of gin, a tablespoon of grenadine, and the white of one egg, shaken and strained into a glass.

Often lemon juice is added to the basic form. Another creamier version of the pink lady that has been around at least since the 1920s adds sweet cream to the basic form. In New Orleans, this version was also known as pink shimmy. In some recipes, the cream is not added to the basic form, but simply replaces the egg white, and sometimes lemon juice is added as well.

Usually the ingredients for any of the versions are shaken over ice, and after straining it into a glass, the cocktail might be garnished with a cherry.

== History ==
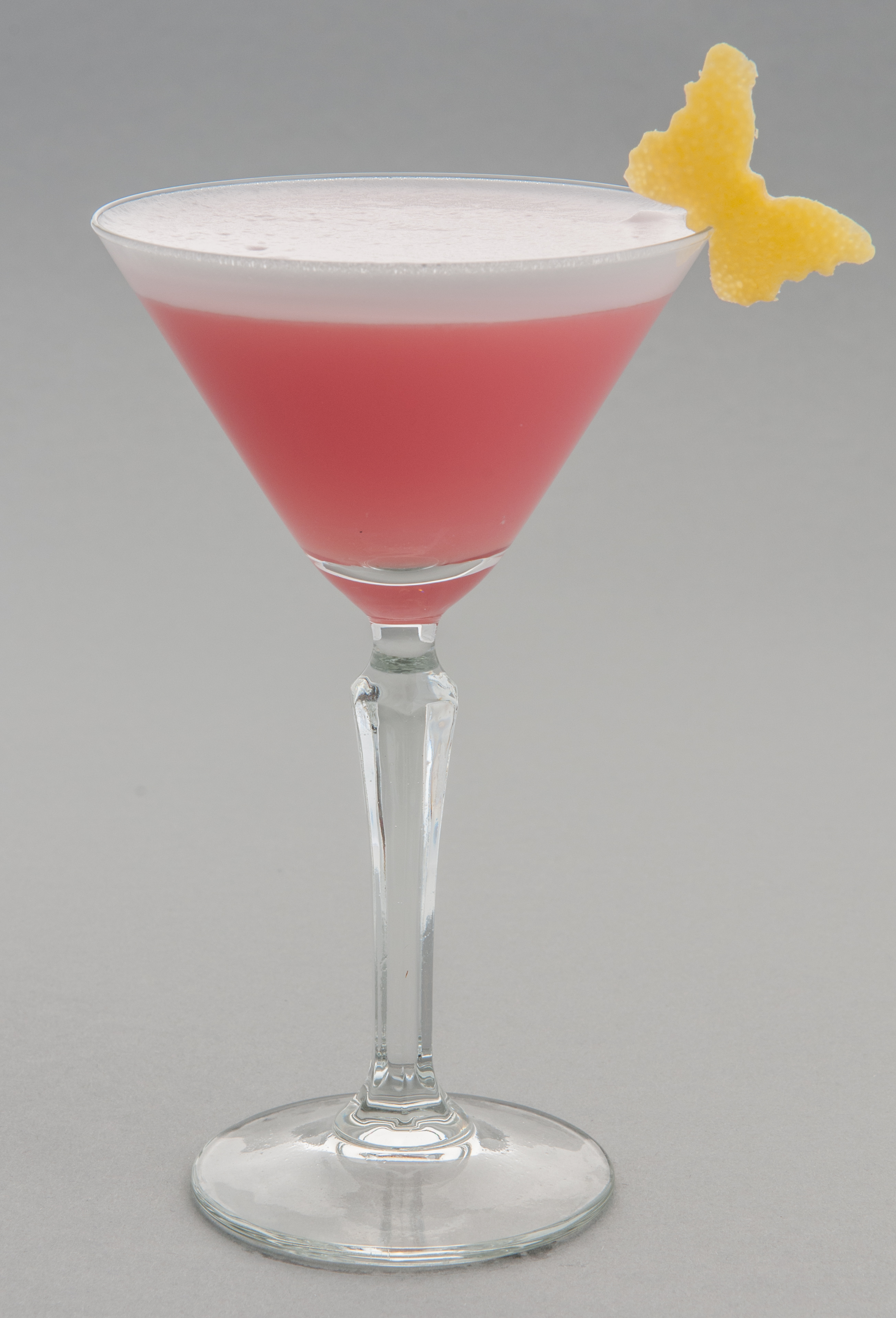
A pink lady

The exact origin of the pink lady is unknown. Its invention is attributed to the interior architect and prominent society figure Elsie de Wolfe (1865–1950), but the recipe associated with her differs from the common recipes for the pink lady. The name of the cocktail itself is sometimes said to be taken from the 1911 Broadway musical by Ivan Caryll of the same name, or named in the honour of its star Hazel Dawn who was known as "The Pink Lady". During the prohibition era (1920–1933) the cocktail was already widely known. In those years it was a popular drink at the Southern Yacht Club in New Orleans, where it was offered under the name pink shimmy as well. Its recipe was due to Armond Schroeder, an assistant manager at the club. The popularity of the pink lady might partially be explained by the frequently poor quality of gin during the prohibition era, due to which there was a need to mask the gin's bad taste.

At the latest in the 1930s the pink lady started to acquire the image of a typical "female" or "girly" drink due to its name and sweet creamy flavor usually associated with a woman's taste in publications like Esquire's Handbook for Hosts (1949). It is said of the Hollywood star and sex symbol Jayne Mansfield, that she used to drink a pink lady before a meal. Subsequently, the cocktail fell out of favour with male cocktail critics, who were put off by its alleged "female" nature. The writer and bartender Jack Townsend speculated in his publication The Bartender's Book (1951) that the very non-threatening appearance of the pink lady may have appealed to women who did not have much experience with alcohol. At one point the pink lady ended up on Esquire's list of the ten worst cocktails.

== See also ==
- List of cocktails
