= Kiss in the Dark (Pink Lady song) =

Single by Pink Lady

from the album Pink Lady
- Language: English
- B-side: "Walk Away Renée"
- Released: January 3, 1979 (U.S.); September 4, 1979 (Japan)
- Genre: Disco; pop
- Length: 3:00 7"; 5:19 12"
- Label: Elektra/Curb (U.S.); Victor (Japan)
- Songwriter: Michael Lloyd
- Producer: Michael Lloyd

Pink Lady singles chronology
"Nami Nori Pirates" (1978)	"Kiss in the Dark" (1979)	"Monday Mona Lisa Club" (1979)

"Kiss in the Dark" (キッス・イン・ザ・ダーク, Kissu in za Dāku) is the 14th single released in Japan, and the first single released in the United States, by Japanese duo Pink Lady. The song was recorded for their debut American album Pink Lady. The duo debuted the song in May 1979 on a Leif Garrett TV special. In Japan, the song peaked at #19 on the Oricon chart. It peaked at #37 on the American Billboard chart. This was the first release of the duo to fail to make the top 10 in Japan. In addition to the all-English version of the song which was a hit in the U.S., Pink Lady recorded a bilingual version for the album We Are Sexy, with the chorus in English and the verses in Japanese. The B-side of the single is a cover of The Left Banke's "Walk Away Renée".

Pink Lady became the first Japanese recording act to chart in America since Kyu Sakamoto ("Sukiyaki") 16 years earlier, and the first to have a hit sung in English, as Sakamoto's hit was sung in Japanese.

In Japan, the single sold 350,000 copies. A re-recorded version of the song was included on the 2-disc greatest hits album, Innovation, released in December 2010.

== Track listing ==
No.	Title	Writer(s)	Arrangement	Length
1.	"Kiss in the Dark"	Michael Lloyd	John D'Andrea	2:55
2.	"Walk Away Renée"	Michael Brown; Bob Calilli; Tony Sansone	Erich Buling	3:10

== Charts ==
Chart (1979)	Peak position
Oricon Chart	19
US Billboard Hot 100	37
US Cash Box magazine	49
Canada RPM Top 100 Singles	64

== See also ==
- 1979 in Japanese music
