= Jun Horie =

Japanese singer-songwriter (born 1960)

- Born: October 19, 1960 (age 65); Hokkaido, Japan
- Occupation: Singer-songwriter
- Years active: 1981–present
- Style: J-Pop
- Height: 164 cm (5 ft 5 in)
- Website: Jun Horie Official Site

Jun Horie (堀江 淳, Horie Jun; born October 19, 1960) is a Japanese singer-songwriter.

== Biography ==
Jun Horie was born in Tomakomai, Hokkaido. He graduated from Sapporo Minami High School, and then concentrated on becoming a livehouse musician. His debut single "Memory Glass" (1981) sold 500,000 units and peaked at number 3 on the Oricon Singles Chart and peaked at number 2 on the Billboard Japan singles chart.
