= Pink Lady (duo) =

Japanese pop duo (1976–)

Pink Lady ピンク・レディー
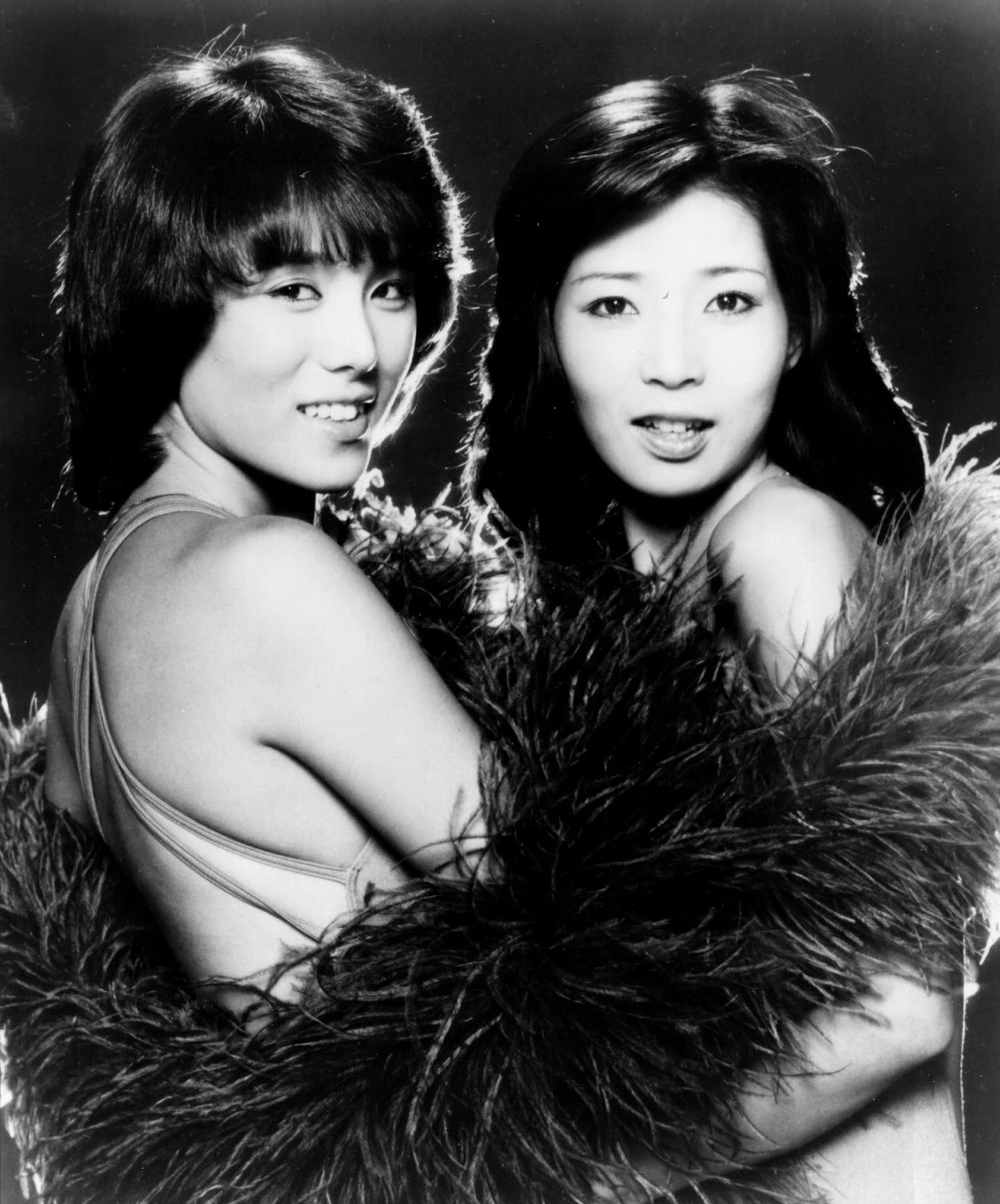
- Mie (left) and Kei (right) in 1979

Background information
- Origin: Aoi-ku, Shizuoka Prefecture, Japan
- Genres: J-pop; kayōkyoku; disco
- Years active: 1976–1981; 1984; 1989; 1996–1997; 2003–2005; 2010–present
- Label: Victor Entertainment; VAP; Teichiku Records; Elektra Records; Curb Records
- Members: "Mie" Mitsuyo Nemoto; "Kei" Keiko Masuda
- Website: Official site

Pink Lady (ピンク・レディー, Pinku Redī) is a Japanese female pop music duo of the late 1970s and early 1980s, featuring Mie (Mitsuyo Nemoto, born March 9, 1958) and Keiko Masuda (formerly Kei, born September 2, 1957). In Japan, they are remembered for a run of pop-chart hits from roughly 1976 to 1979, but in the United States, they are best known for their short-lived 1980 NBC TV variety show Pink Lady and Jeff.

Pink Lady is one of only two Japanese artists to have reached the Billboard Top 40, hitting No. 37 with the single "Kiss in the Dark"; the other was Kyu Sakamoto with the original Japanese-language version of "Sukiyaki". They are also the first Japanese act ever to have performed in Seoul, South Korea, in November 1980.

In June 1979, Billboard stated the duo had sales of over US$72 million in Japan, and stated in September 1980 that Pink Lady's singles had grossed over US$40 million, their album releases over US$25 million, and their TV appearances, such as commercials and product sponsorship, near US$35 million—a combined total exceeding US$100 million.

== Biography ==
=== Early history ===
Mitsuyo Nemoto and Keiko Masuda were childhood friends who grew up and attended school together in Japan's Shizuoka Prefecture. In 1973, they attended the Yamaha Music School in Hamamatsu. In May 1974, the duo formed a folk group called "Cookie" (クッキー, Kukkī) and passed Yamaha's "Challenge on Stage" (チャレンジ・オン・ステージ, Charenji on Sutēji) audition. Nemoto and Masuda first appeared in March 1976 on NTV's prime-time TV talent show Star Tanjō!, performing a cover of Pīman's 1974 song "Heya wo Dete Kudasai" (部屋を出て下さい; "Please Leave the Room"). They were showcased as a cute, fresh-faced folk duo dressed in bib overalls. The duo's performance earned them a contract with Victor Entertainment. They were also affiliated with the talent management firm T&C Music (T&C ミュージック, Tī ando Shī Myūjikku), which gave them a makeover to compete with the teen trio Candies. Songwriter/producer Shunichi Tokura named the duo "Pink Lady" after the cocktail, while Yū Aku was assigned to write lyrics for their songs. Tokura and Aku previously composed hit songs for Linda Yamamoto and Finger 5. Hajime Doi supervised the duo's dance choreography while Yōko Noguchi designed their costumes. In addition, Nemoto and Masuda took the stage names of "Mie" (ミー, Mī; sometimes spelled "Mii") and "Kei" (ケイ), respectively. By the time the girls re-appeared on the show five months later, their image had completely changed - they were now dressed in slinky, beaded, short-skirted white dresses, performing upbeat pop tunes.

=== Peak of popularity ===
Pink Lady epitomizes the Japanese concept of the pop-star "idol" (アイドル, Aidoru), singing catchy, hook-filled pop songs, often with a disco flavor (in later years especially), and performing almost perfectly synchronized dances to accompany their songs. They made their debut in August 1976 with the single "Pepper Keibu", which peaked at No. 4 on Oricon's charts. From 1976 to 1979, Pink Lady had a streak of nine No. 1 hits starting with "S.O.S."; five of which were consecutive million-selling singles according to Oricon; these include "Nagisa no Sindbad", "Wanted," "UFO" (their biggest-selling single, with 1.95 million copies sold), "Southpaw, and "Monster". This record was held until February 1983, when Seiko Matsuda's "Himitsu no Hanazono" became her 10th consecutive No. 1 single. With their 1978 single "Chameleon Army", Pink Lady stayed at Oricon's No. 1 position for a combined total of 63 weeks - a record they held until B'z achieved a total of 64 weeks in January 2015 with their single "Uchōten". The duo became commercial pitchwomen for various products, ranging from shampoo to radios to children's books to ramen noodles. Just about every product Pink Lady endorsed enjoyed a massive uptick in sales. As one example, Ito En's business skyrocketed when the duo said on TV that they lost weight after drinking 10 cups of oolong tea a day, triggering a massive demand and prompting Ito En to order 5,000 tons of oolong tea in 1979 and revolutionize the sales of canned oolong tea a year later.

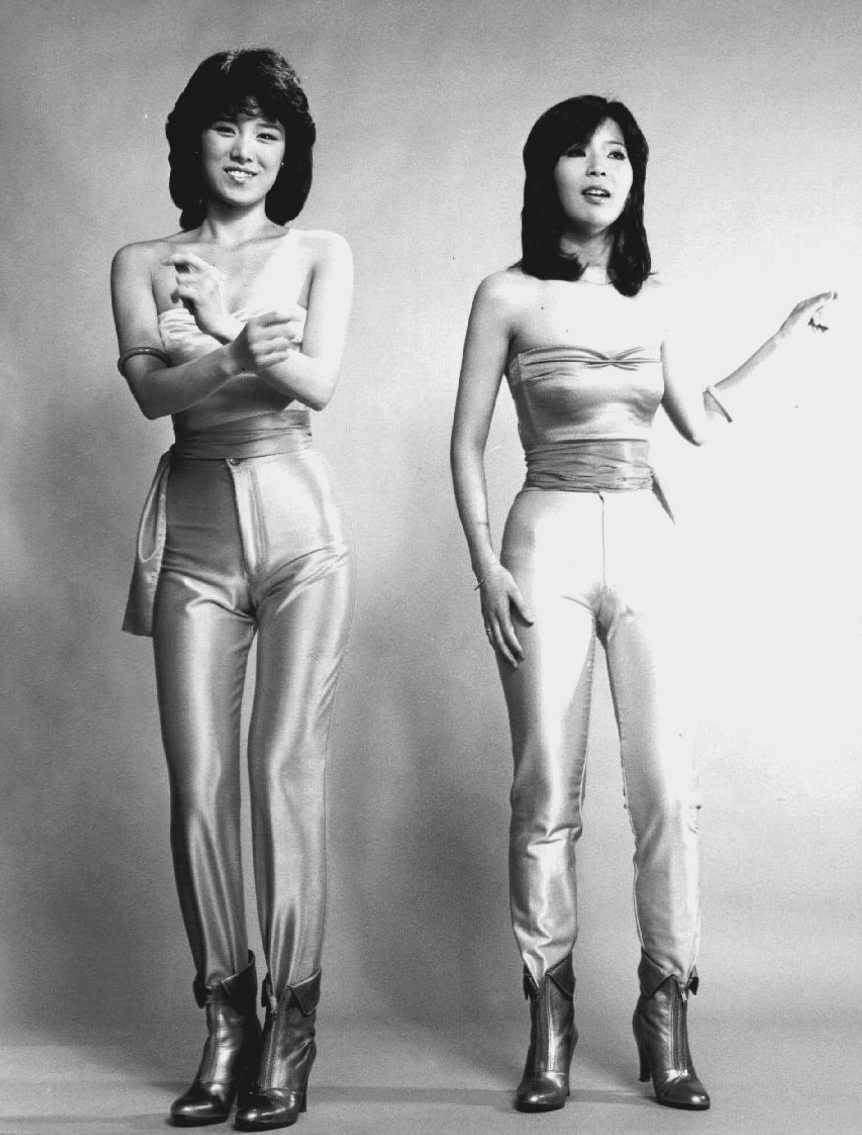
Pink Lady in 1980

The peak of Pink Lady's popularity was in 1978, during which they headlined a concert at Korakuen Stadium in Tokyo with over 100,000 fans in attendance. In addition, they made their first concert appearance in the United States (at the Tropicana in Las Vegas), and starred in their first major full-length motion picture titled Pink Lady no Katsudō Daishashin (ピンク・レディーの活動大写真, Pinku Redī no Katsudō Daishashin; lit. Pink Lady's Big Motion Picture). The duo also traveled to Greece to film a TV special and have photos taken for a special photobook. Furthermore, they became cartoon stars with the airing of Pink Lady Monogatari: Eiko no Tenshi-tachi (ピンク・レディー物語 栄光の天使たち; The Story of Pink Lady: Angels of Splendid Fame), a 35-episode anime television series directed by Katsuhiko Taguchi and aired on Tokyo 12 Channel. The series was commissioned by T&C Music, with animation production by Toei Animation. Voice actresses Michiko Nomura and Junko Hori voiced Mie and Kei respectively. Pink Lady won the Grand Prix at two of Japan's most prestigious music awards, the 20th Japan Record Awards and All Japan Popular Music Awards.

Between 1977 and 1979, Pink Lady hosted nine television programs between four networks, ranging from children's shows to variety shows and game shows. Because many of these shows aired on the same day, Mie and Kei had to commute from one network to another, with both of them having an average daily sleep time of 45 minutes. The duo's hectic schedule created the term "Busy as Pink Lady" (ピンク・レディー並みの忙しさ, Pinku Redī Nami no Isogashi-sa) in Japan's entertainment world.

Pink Lady's net worth at the time was estimated to be between ¥20 billion and ¥50 billion, but T&C Music initially paid Mie and Kei ¥300,000 per month each on their first year; afterwards, their salary was raised to ¥3 million per month. As for the rest of the profits, it was reported that T&C Music was a subsidiary of a secret firm run by a yakuza syndicate, which collected 70% of the earnings.

However, New Year's Eve 1978 represented the beginning of a downturn for Pink Lady. Mie and Kei turned down an invitation to perform on NHK's long-running annual New Year's Eve television music program Kōhaku Uta Gassen (Red and White Song Battle) to host their own TV special Pink Lady: 150 Minutes of Sweat and Tears on New Year's Eve!! (ピンク・レディー汗と涙の大晦日150分!!, Pinku Redī Ase to Namida no Ōmisoka Hyakugojū-bu!!) on NTV. Their decision backfired, as Kohaku garnered ratings nine times higher than Pink Lady's show. In addition, T&C Music announced that they had invited students from a school for the blind to the studio for the taping of the show, but the school denied that any such arrangement had been made. Critics accused Pink Lady of using blind children to promote their own TV special. The duo was not invited to perform again on Kōhaku the following year, and in fact did not perform on the annual special until 1988 - well after the duo had disbanded.

In May 1979, Pink Lady performed a charity concert at the Osaka Expo '70 Stadium in front of 200,000 spectators, of which all profits went to UNICEF. It was the biggest event of its kind up until then.

=== Pink Lady in the United States ===
At the beginning of 1979, Pink Lady focused on the American market. Mie and Kei appeared as guest stars on a Leif Garrett TV special that spring, performing what was to be their first American single, a disco tune called "Kiss in the Dark," recorded phonetically in English and released by Curb Records, followed by an entire English-language album (a collection of disco tunes and ballads, including a cover of The Left Banke's 1966 classic "Walk Away Renée"). When "Kiss in the Dark" debuted on the Billboard charts that summer, Pink Lady became the first Japanese recording act to chart in America since Kyu Sakamoto hit No. 1 with "Sukiyaki" 16 years earlier. "Kiss In The Dark" reached No. 37 on Billboard's Top 40, (No. 49 on the Cash Box magazine chart). Their U.S. album reached the highest position of No. 205, according to Billboard.

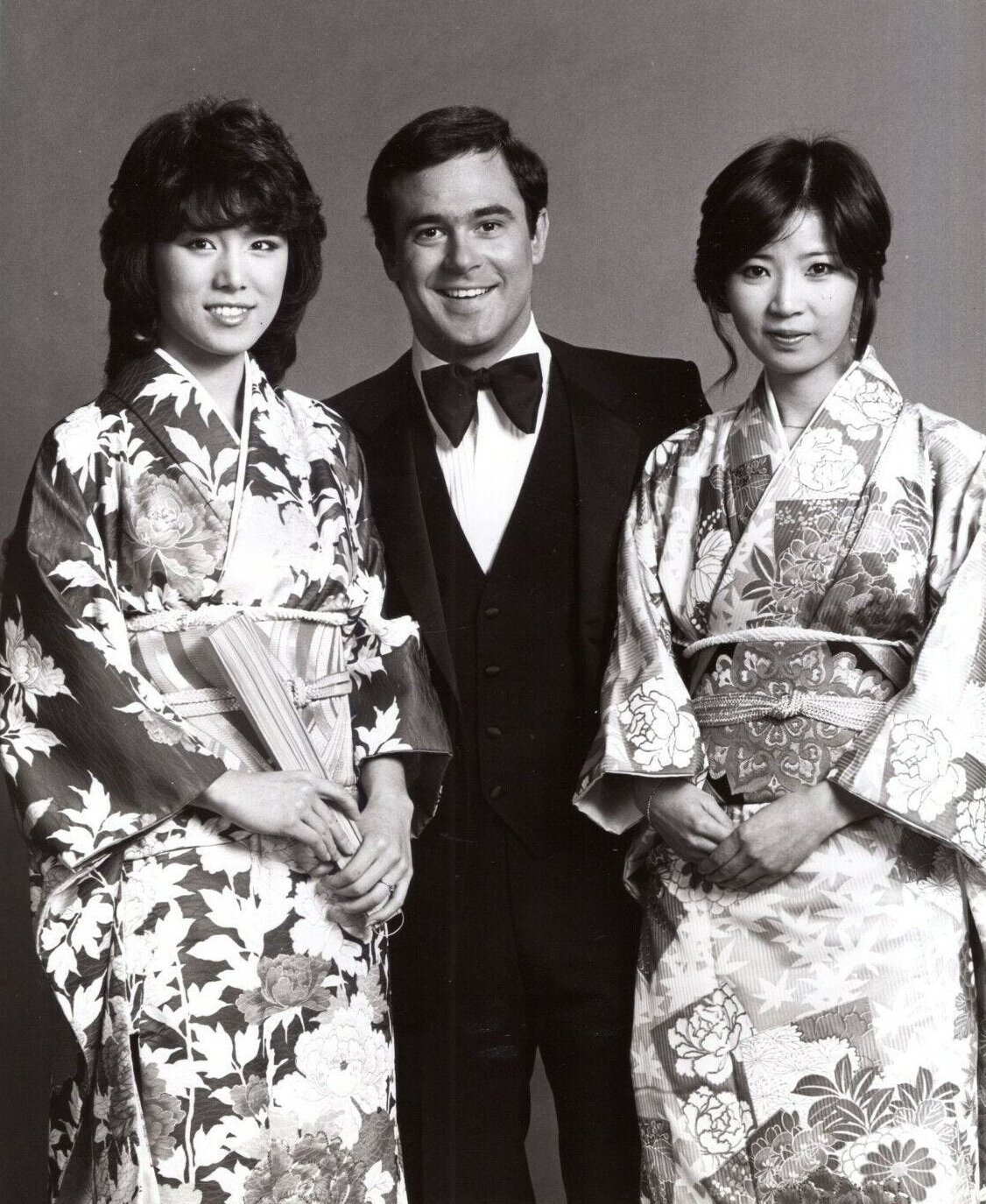
Pink Lady and Jeff Altman in a promotional picture of their eponymous show, 1980

Afterwards, the duo appeared with comedian Jeff Altman in the variety show Pink Lady and Jeff, a mixture of musical numbers and sketch comedy. The fact that Mie and Kei knew very little English limited their potential as comedians, and also caused them a great amount of stress, since both were essentially forced to memorize dialogue neither could understand. On top of that, they were forbidden to perform any of their Japanese hits until late in the show's short run, being forced to struggle through English-language disco and pop hits such as "Yesterday" and "Knock on Wood." Pink Lady and Jeff lasted only six weeks in prime time on NBC before being pulled off the air, and to this day is celebrated by many as one of the worst television shows in history, as well as single-handedly killing off the variety show format that had been a staple of American television since its early days. Frustrated by their show's failure, Pink Lady returned to Japan and never again attempted a run at the U.S. market. The albums and singles they released in America are now out of print, and one of the only ways for U.S. fans to get hold of Pink Lady's music is through Japanese imports.

=== Decline, disbandments, and reunions ===
Pink Lady's lack of visibility at home while they were filming their variety show in Hollywood, as well as the decline of disco music, hurt their record sales even in Japan. Tokura sued T&C Music for unpaid royalties totaling to US$17,700 after the management firm lost millions of dollars on investing in Pink Lady and Jeff. In addition, Kei was in a publicized affair with singer Goro Noguchi since 1979. This affair angered the duo's management, who forced her to choose between her career and her relationship with Noguchi. Kei chose to become engaged to Noguchi. On September 1, 1980, the duo held a press conference at the Akasaka Prince Hotel to announce their disbandment within six months. Four years and seven months after their formation, Pink Lady performed their final concert at Korakuen Stadium on March 31, 1981, before going their separate ways. T&C Music went bankrupt shortly after the duo's disbandment. Following their breakup, Mie and Kei pursued separate careers as solo singers and actresses, with Mie retaining her stage name and Kei using her real name. Masuda's engagement to Noguchi was broken when he had an affair with actress Keiko Saito.

The duo reunited in 1984 to release the album Suspense under VAP Records and perform some reunion concerts before once again disbanding. Pink Lady's second reunion occurred in 1989 for the 40th Kōhaku Uta Gassen; they also performed in the 41st installment of the New Year's Eve special a year later before going their separate ways for a third time. In 1990, the duo were featured in a TV special where Mie visited Masuda in Paris before they took a train to Rome and Milan. This special coincided with the release of Masuda's French-language album Simples Confidences (released in Japan as Voice Cologne).

In 1996, to commemorate their 20th anniversary, Pink Lady reunited for a third time to release the compilation Pink Lady Best Selection and "Pink Eyed Soul", their first new single in 12 years. To celebrate the new millennium, the duo performed in the 51st Kōhaku Uta Gassen in 2000 and became the most featured act in the New Year's special. Following the performance, they disbanded once again.

In 2003, Pink Lady made a fourth reunion following the immense popularity of the pachinko game CR Pink Lady (CRピンク・レディー, CR Pinku Redī) a year earlier. A PlayStation 2 version of this game was also released on October 31, 2002, by Sunsoft, titled Hissatsu Pachinko Station V5 Pink Lady (必殺パチンコステーションV5 ピンクレディー). In addition, Mie and Kei earned royalties of ¥100 million each after the pachinko game sold over 100,000 units. They announced a series of nationwide tours beginning with Pink Lady Typhoon ~Again~ Pink Lady Memorial Concert -Japan Tour 2003- (PINK LADY TYPHOON〜AGAIN〜ピンク・レディー メモリアル・コンサート -JAPAN TOUR 2003-). In 2004, the duo hosted the tour Pink Lady Memorial Concert Vol. 2: Monster Panic (ピンク・レディー メモリアル・コンサートVol.2 モンスターパニック), as well as doing collaboration performances with Morning Musume and SMAP. In 2005, the duo announced their farewell tour in Japan, titled Pink Lady Memorial Concert Vol. 3: Last Tour Unforgettable Final Ovation (ピンク・レディー メモリアル・コンサートVol.3 LAST TOUR Unforgettable Final Ovation). That same year, they released two choreography DVDs for all their singles up to "Chameleon Army".

In October 2007, Pink Lady sued Kobunsha for ¥3.7 million after the publisher's magazine Josei Jishin used photos of the duo in an article on dieting through dancing without their permission. The case was rejected by the Tokyo District Court. In February 2012, the Supreme Court rejected the duo's appeal based on the right of publicity.

On September 1, 2010, Pink Lady held a press conference at Victor Studios to proclaim: "No more disbandments!" (解散やめ！, Kaisan yame!) and announce their comeback by releasing a specialized photo-book titled Heibon Premium: We Are Pink Lady (平凡Premium We are ピンク・レディー). Innovation, a two-disc album with re-recorded versions of their past hits, was released in December of that same year. A concert tour was followed in March 2011, which marked the 30th anniversary since their first official disbandment in 1981.

On December 30, 2017, Pink Lady appeared at the 59th Japan Record Awards to pay tribute to Yū Aku, who posthumously received the Special Award for the 50th anniversary of his songwriting career. They performed a medley of "Pepper Keibu", "Wanted" and "UFO" in the show. A year later, the duo appeared at the 60th Japan Record Awards to pay tribute to Keizō Takahashi, who hosted the 20th Japan Record Awards ceremony where "UFO" won the Japan Record Award. For this event, they performed a medley of "UFO", "S.O.S.", "Nagisa no Sindbad", and "Southpaw".

On December 13, 2019, Pink Lady released the song "Meteor" for the anime film Yo-kai Watch Jam the Movie: Yo-Kai Academy Y - Can a Cat be a Hero?. This was the duo's first new single in over 15 years. Also in the same month, the duo's 12 albums released from 1977 to 1979 were remastered in digital format and distributed to various subscription services.

In July 2020, Mie and Masuda were selected in the women's category of the 6th Platinum Age Awards, which honors celebrities over the age of 60.

== Legacy ==
During Pink Lady's reunion in 1996, Dentsu and Hakuhodo created Pink Lady X (ピンク・レディーX, Pinku Redī Ekkusu), a next generation duo which consisted of Sayaka (Asuka Tsutsui) (さやか（筒井明日）, Sayaka (Tsutsui Asuka)) and Chizuru (Chizuru Soya) (ちずる（征矢千鶴）, Chizuru (Soya Chizuru)). This incarnation was not recognized by the original duo. Pink Lady X renamed themselves PLX and released three singles before disbanding a year later.

Pink Lady's music has been used as background music in several anime series (aside from the aforementioned Angels of Splendid Fame biographical series), including Lupin III Part II, His and Her Circumstances, Alice SOS, Natsu no Arashi!, and Gun Sword.

On August 1, 2008, Pink Lady was portrayed by Morning Musume members Ai Takahashi as Mie and Risa Niigaki as Kei in the NTV special Hitmaker: The Yū Aku Story (ヒットメーカー 阿久悠物語, Hittomēkā Aku Yū Monogatari).

In 2009, the Yū Aku tribute album Bad Friends was released, featuring covers of Pink Lady's songs by Anna Tsuchiya & Mari Natsuki, Watarirouka Hashiritai 7, Checkicco, Yu Takahashi & Nana Yanagisawa, and many more.

In 2011, the Japanese music program Music Station listed Pink Lady in their Top 50 Idols of All-time based on their sales figures supplied by Oricon. The duo were placed no. 15, with sales exceeding 13,000,000. Billboard, however, states they sold over 15 million singles and 2.25 million albums.

In 2014, Tokura introduced the 14-member tribute group Pink Babies (ピンク・ベイビーズ, Pinku Beibīzu) as part of his "Pan-Pacific Project". Pink Babies released their covers of "Nagisa no Sindbad", and "UFO", as well as a music video for "Wanted" before disbanding in 2017. On September 3, 2018, seven of the original members reunited for one night only for the NHK BS Premium special Kokoro no Kajin-tachi (こころの歌人たち; Singers of the Heart), which aired on September 30.

A special tribute concert to commemorate Pink Lady's 50th anniversary will be held at Line Cube Shibuya August 25, 2026. The concert will feature Akasaki, Ayana Arai and Momoka Ito of AKB48, Airi Suzuki, Meimi Tamura, Yo Hitoto, Kanako Momota of Momoiro Clover Z, Chisato Moritaka, and Maki Watase of Lindberg. The tribute album Pink Lady Legend, Now and Forever is scheduled for release on August 26 and will also feature Kazuya Yoshii, Kyoko Koizumi, Koda Kumi, and Ua.

== Discography ==
- Pepper Keibu (1977)
- Hoshi kara Kita Futari (1978)
- Magical Music Tour (1979)
- Pink Lady (1979)
- We Are Sexy (1979)
- Suspense ~Pink Lady Again~ (1984)
- Innovation (2010)

== Filmography ==
=== TV ===
- Shabon-tama Holiday (シャボン玉ホリデー, Shabon-tama Horidē; Soap Bubble Holiday) (NTV, 1976 October 9 - 1977 March 26)
- Yanmar Family Hour Fly! Son Goku (ヤンマーファミリーアワー 飛べ!孫悟空, Yanmā Famirī Awā Tobe! Son Gokū) (TBS, 1977 October 11 - 1979 March 27)
- Ki ni Naru Kisetsu (気になる季節; Anxious Season) (TV Asahi, 1977 October 16 - 1978 March 26)
- 24 Hour Television: Love Saves the Earth (24時間テレビ 「愛は地球を救う」, Nijū-yo Jikan Terebi `Ai wa Chikyū wo Sukuu') (NTV, 1978 August 26 - 1979 August 25)
- Hello! Pink Lady (ハロー! ピンク・レディー, Harō! Pinku Redī) (Tokyo 12 Channel, 1978 April 6 - September 28)
- This Is Pink Lady (ディス・イズ・ピンク・レディー, Disu Izu Pinku Redī) (Tokyo 12 Channel, 1978)
- Run! Pink Lady (走れ!ピンク・レディー, Hashire! Pinku Redī) (TV Asahi, 1978 October 5 - 1979 March 29)
- NTV's The Hit! Pink Hyappatsu Hyakuchū (NTVザ・ヒット! ピンク百発百中!, NTV Za Hitto! Pinku Hyappatsu Hyakuchū; NTV's The Hit! Pink Bullseye) (NTV, 1978 October 11 - 1979 September 26)
- UFO Seven Daibōken (UFOセブン大冒険, Yūfō Sebun Daibōken; UFO Seven's Big Adventure) (TBS, 1978 April 6 - September 28)
- Tamarima Seven Dai Hōsō! (たまりまセブン大放送!; Tamarima Seven's Big Broadcast!) (TBS, 1978 October 24 - 1979 June 26)
- Pink Lady: 150 Minutes of Sweat and Tears on New Year's Eve!! (ピンク・レディー汗と涙の大晦日150分!!, Pinku Redī Ase to Namida no Ōmisoka Hyakugojū-bu!!) (NTV, 1978 December 31)
- The Chance! (ザ・チャンス!, Za Chansu!) (TBS, 1979 April 10 - 1980 February)
- Pink Lady and Jeff (NBC, 1980 March 1 - April 4)
- Forever '84 Pink Lady ~How Are You?~ (Forever'84 Pink Lady～お元気でした？～, Fōebā Hachijū-yo Pinku Redī ~Ogenki Deshita?~) (TBS, 1984 September 9)

==== Kōhaku Uta Gassen appearances ====
Year / Broadcast	Appearance	Song	Appearance order	Opponent
1977 (Shōwa 52) / 28th	Debut	"Wanted (Shimei Tehai)"	2/24	Kariudo
1989 (Heisei 1) / 40th	2	Hit Medley ("Pepper Keibu"/"UFO"/"Southpaw")	Part 1	N/A
1990 (Heisei 2) / 41st	3	Pink Lady Medley ("S.O.S."/"Nagisa no Sindbad"/"Wanted (Shimei Tehai)"/"2-nen me no Jinx")	11/29	Tama
2000 (Heisei 12) / 51st	4	Special Medley Pink Lady 2000 ("Pepper Keibu"/"UFO"/"Southpaw")	21/28	ALICE

=== Film ===
- Pink Lady no Katsudō Daishashin (ピンク・レディーの活動大写真; Pink Lady's Big Motion Picture) (Toho, 1978 December 16)
- Pink Lady to Haruyasumi (ピンク・レディーと春休み; Pink Lady Spring Break) (Toei, 1979 March 17)
- Pīman 80 (ピーマン80, Pīman Hachi-jū) (Toho, 1979 September 8)

== Bibliography ==
- Schilling, Mark (1997). "Pink Lady". The Encyclopedia of Japanese Pop Culture. New York: Weatherhill. pp. 186–189. ISBN 0-8348-0380-1.
