= 1980 in Japanese music =

In 1980 (Shōwa 55), Japanese music was released on records and performed in concerts, and there were charts, awards, contests and festivals.

During that year, Japan continued to have the second largest popular music market in the world.

== Awards, contests and festivals ==
The 13th Japan record sales awards (Japanese: 日本レコードセールス大賞) were held in 1980.

The 9th Tokyo Music Festival was held on 30 March 1980. Feeling Old Feelings by Dionne Warwick won the grand prize. Body Language by The Dooleys won the Gold Award.

The 22nd Osaka International Festival (Japanese: 大阪国際フェスティバル) was held from 7 to 27 April 1980. The 19th Yamaha Popular Song Contest was held on 11 May 1980. The 20th Yamaha Popular Song Contest was held on 5 October 1980. The 11th World Popular Song Festival was held on 14 to 16 November 1980. The 11th Japan Music Awards were held on 18 November 1980. The final of the 9th FNS Music Festival was held on 16 December 1980. The 22nd Japan Record Awards were held on 31 December 1980. The 31st NHK Kōhaku Uta Gassen was held on 31 December 1980.

The 29th Otaka prize was won by Tōru Takemitsu.

== Concerts ==
The "All Nite Rock Show '80" was held from 21 to 22 June 1980. Momoe Yamaguchi's farewell concert was on 5 October 1980. (There was a live album and video).

== Number one singles ==
Oricon

The following reached number 1 on the weekly Oricon Singles Chart:

Issue date	Song	Artist(s)
7 January	"Ihōjin"	Saki Kubota
14 January	"Ihōjin"	Saki Kubota
21 January	"Ihōjin"	Saki Kubota
28 January	"Daitokai"	Crystal King
4 February	"Daitokai"	Crystal King
11 February	"Daitokai"	Crystal King
18 February	"Daitokai"	Crystal King
25 February	"Daitokai"	Crystal King
3 March	"Daitokai"	Crystal King
10 March	"Okuru Kotoba"	Kaientai
17 March	"Okuru Kotoba"	Kaientai
24 March	"Okuru Kotoba"	Kaientai
31 March	"Okuru Kotoba"	Kaientai
7 April	"Okuru Kotoba"	Kaientai
14 April	"Okuru Kotoba"	Kaientai
21 April	"Runaway"	Chanels
28 April	"Runaway"	Chanels
5 May	"Runaway"	Chanels
12 May	"Runaway"	Chanels
19 May	"Runaway"	Chanels
26 May	"Runaway"	Chanels
2 June	"Runaway"	Chanels
9 June	"Dancing All Night"	Monta & Brothers
16 June	"Dancing All Night"	Monta & Brothers
23 June	"Dancing All Night"	Monta & Brothers
30 June	"Dancing All Night"	Monta & Brothers
7 July	"Dancing All Night"	Monta & Brothers
14 July	"Dancing All Night"	Monta & Brothers
21 July	"Dancing All Night"	Monta & Brothers
28 July	"Dancing All Night"	Monta & Brothers
4 August	"Dancing All Night"	Monta & Brothers
11 August	"Dancing All Night"	Monta & Brothers
18 August	"Junko / Namida no Serenade"	Tsuyoshi Nagabuchi
25 August	"Junko / Namida no Serenade"	Tsuyoshi Nagabuchi
1 September	"Junko / Namida no Serenade"	Tsuyoshi Nagabuchi
8 September	"Junko / Namida no Serenade"	Tsuyoshi Nagabuchi
15 September	"Junko / Namida no Serenade"	Tsuyoshi Nagabuchi
22 September	"Junko / Namida no Serenade"	Tsuyoshi Nagabuchi
29 September	"Hatto Shite! Good"	Toshihiko Tahara
6 October	"Hatto Shite! Good"	Toshihiko Tahara
13 October	"Kaze wa Akiiro / Eighteen"	Seiko Matsuda
20 October	"Kaze wa Akiiro / Eighteen"	Seiko Matsuda
27 October	"Kaze wa Akiiro / Eighteen"	Seiko Matsuda
3 November	"Kaze wa Akiiro / Eighteen"	Seiko Matsuda
10 November	"Kaze wa Akiiro / Eighteen"	Seiko Matsuda
17 November	"I'm In the Mood for Dancing"; Japanese title: "Dancing Sister" (ダンシング・シスター)	The Nolans
24 November	"I'm In the Mood for Dancing"; Japanese title: "Dancing Sister" (ダンシング・シスター)	The Nolans
1 December	"Koibito yo"	Mayumi Itsuwa
8 December	"Koibito yo"	Mayumi Itsuwa
15 December	"Koibito yo"	Mayumi Itsuwa
22 December	"Sneaker Blues"	Masahiko Kondō
29 December	"Sneaker Blues"	Masahiko Kondō

The Best Ten

The following reached number 1 on The Best Ten chart:

- 10 January and 17 January: Ihojin - Saki Kubota. There was no broadcast on 3 January.
- 26 June, 3 July, 24 July, 31 July, 7 August, 14 August, 21 August: "Dancing All Night" - Monta & Brothers
- 28 August, 4 September and 11 September: "Aishu Deito (New York City Nights)" - Toshihiko Tahara.

== Number one albums and LPs ==
Oricon

The following reached number 1 on the Oricon chart:

- 7 January, 14 January, 21 January, 28 January, 4 February, 11 February: Yumegatari by Saki Kubota
- Public Pressure - Yellow Magic Orchestra

Music Labo

The following reached number 1 on the Music Labo chart:

- 14 January, 21 January, 28 January and 4 February: Yumegatari by Saki Kubota
- 11 February, 18 February, 25 February and 3 March: Kishotenketsu - Chiharu Matsuyama
- 10 March and 17 March: Greatest Hits Vol. 2 - ABBA
- 24 March and 31 March: Love Songs - Mariya Takeuchi
- 7 April and 14 April: Tiny Bubbles - Southern All Stars
- 21 April, 28 April and 5 May: Ikiteite mo Ii Desu ka - Miyuki Nakajima
- 12 May, 19 May, 26 May and 2 June: Roman - Chiharu Matsuyama
- 9 June and 16 June: Mr Black - Chanels
- 23 June and 30 June: X∞Multiplies - Yellow Magic Orchestra
- 7 July, 14 July, 21 July, 28 July and 4 August: Solid State Survivor - Yellow Magic Orchestra
- 11 August, 18 August and 25 August: Act - Monta & Brothers
- 1 September and 8 September: Gyakuryu - Tsuyoshi Nagabuchi
- 16 September: Alice VIII - Alice
- 22 September, 29 September and 6 October: Kampai - Tsuyoshi Nagabuchi
- 13 October: Ride on Time - Tatsuro Yamashita
- 20 October: Koibito Yo - Mayumi Itsuwa
- 27 October and 3 November: Inshouha - Masashi Sada
- 10 November, 17 November and 24 November: The Best - Junko Yagami
- 1 December and 8 December: Kogarashi Ni Dakarete - Chiharu Matsuyama
- 15 December and 22 December: We Are - Off Course

Cash Box of Japan

The following reached number 1 on the Cash Box of Japan chart:

- 5 January, 12 January, 19 January, 22 March and 29 March: Kishotenketsu - Chiharu Matsuyama
- 2 February, 9 February, 16 February, 1 March and 15 March: Yumegatari - Saki Kubota
- 5 April, 12 April, 19 April and 26 April: Love Songs - Mariya Takeuchi
- 3 May: Tiny Bubbles - Southern All Stars
- 10 May and 24 May: Ikiteite mo Ii Desu ka - Miyuki Nakajima
- 7 June: Roman - Chiharu Matsuyama
- 28 June and 5 July: Mr Black - Chanels
- 19 July, 26 July, 9 August and 16 August: Solid State Survivor - Yellow Magic Orchestra
- 23 August and 6 September: Act 1 - Monta & Brothers
- 13 September: Squall - Seiko Matsuda
- 20 September: Gyakuryu - Tsuyoshi Nagabuchi
- 11 October and 18 October: Kanpayi - Tsuyoshi Nagabuchi
- 25 October: Ride on Time - Tatsuro Yamashita
- 8 November and 16 November: Inshouha - Masashi Sada
- 22 November, 29 November, 6 December, 13 December and 20 December: The Best - Junko Yagami
- 27 December: Kogarashini Dakarete - Chiharu Matsuyama

== Annual charts ==
Monta & Brothers's Dancing All Night was number 1 in the Oricon annual singles chart, and Saki Kubota's Ihojin was number 2.

== Film and television ==
The music of Kagemusha, by Shin'ichirō Ikebe, won the 35th Mainichi Film Award for Best Music. The music of A Distant Cry from Spring (1980), by Masaru Sato, won the 4th Japan Academy Film Prize for Best Music (awarded in 1981). Lalabel, the Magical Girl includes songs by Mitsuko Horie. Animation: The Best Ten 1980, a parody of The Best Ten, was released on 20 December.

== Debuts ==
- 1 June: Juicy Fruits released Jenny Wa Gokigen Naname

== Overseas ==
The single Gandhara by Godiego reached number 56 on the UK singles chart.

From 1 March to 4 April, Pink Lady appeared in the television programme, sometimes called Pink Lady and Jeff, broadcast in the United States of America. Pink Lady participated in the World Song Festival held in Seoul in South Korea from 21 to 23 November, and were the first Japanese musicians to perform in a concert in Seoul.

The eponymous album Yellow Magic Orchestra reached number 81 on the Billboard 200 chart in the United States. The single, "Computer Game", from that album, reached number 17 on the UK singles chart, and number 60 on the Billboard Hot 100 chart. The album X∞Multiplies, by the same band, reached number 177 on the Billboard 200 chart.

The song "Hana" (花〜すべての人の心に花を〜) by Shoukichi Kina was a hit in China, Thailand, Indonesia and other Asian countries, and sold 30 million copies.

== Other singles released ==
- Ai Giri Giri, Sekai Eiyushi, Utakata and Remember (Fame) by Pink Lady
- Behind the Mask and Rydeen by Yellow Magic Orchestra
- Ride on Time and My Sugar Babe by Tatsuro Yamashita
- Nijūgoji and Kugatsu No Iro by Saki Kubota
- Ōsaka Shigure by Harumi Miyako
- Hadashi no Kisetsu and Aoi Sangoshou by Seiko Matsuda
- Shanikusai, Rock 'n' Roll Widow, Sayonara no Mukōgawa and Ichie by Momoe Yamaguchi

== Other albums released ==
- Turning Point by Pink Lady
- Tenkai and Saudade by Saki Kubota
- B-2 Unit by Ryuichi Sakamoto
- Murdered by the Music by Yukihiro Takahashi
- Make Up City by Casiopea
- Landsale by P-Model
- Every Night by Yōsui Inoue
- Rockoon by T-Square
- Tasogare by Mai Yamane
- Harutsugedori, Möbius Game, Phoenix Densetsu and This is My Trial by Momoe Yamaguchi
- 21 June: Toki no Nai Hotel - Yuming
- November: Yume Hikō (Japanese: 夢飛行) by Mioko Yamaguchi
- 5 December: On the Street Corner by Tatsuro Yamashita

== History ==
In 2007, Shūkan Shōwa Taimuzu featured Saki Kubota on the back cover as person of the moment (Japanese: 時の人) for 1980.

"Sneaker Blues" by Masahiko Kondō was released on 12 December 1980. Momoe Yamaguchi retired in 1980.

== See also ==
- Timeline of Japanese music
- 1980 in Japan
- 1980 in music
- w:ja:1980年の音楽
