= 1981 in Japanese music =

In 1981 (Shōwa 56), Japanese music was released on records and performed in concerts, and there were charts, awards, contests and festivals.

During that year, Japan continued to have the second largest music market in the world, eleven percent of all record sales took place in that country, and the value of tapes and records made there was $1.15 billion.

== Awards, contests and festivals ==
The 10th Tokyo Music Festival was held on 29 March 1981. The 23rd Osaka International Festival (Japanese: 大阪国際フェスティバル) was held from 8 to 28 April 1981. The 21st Yamaha Popular Song Contest was held on 10 May 1981. The 22nd Yamaha Popular Song Contest was held on 4 October 1981. The 12th World Popular Song Festival was held on 1 November 1981. The 12th Japan Music Awards were held on 12 November 1981. The final of the 10th FNS Music Festival was held on 15 December 1981. The 23rd Japan Record Awards were held on 31 December 1981. The 32nd NHK Kōhaku Uta Gassen was held on 31 December 1981.

The 30th Otaka prize was won by Toshi Ichiyanagi and Atsutada Otaka.

== Concerts ==
The economic recession adversely affected concerts. Pioneer Live Special concerts were held in 1981.

== Number one singles ==
Oricon

The following reached number 1 on the weekly Oricon Singles Chart:

Issue date	Song	Artist(s)
5 January	"Sneaker Blues"	Masahiko Kondō
12 January	"Sneaker Blues"	Masahiko Kondō
19 January	"Sneaker Blues"	Masahiko Kondō
26 January	"Do!"	Toshihiko Tahara
2 February	"Do!"	Toshihiko Tahara
9 February	"Cherry Blossom"	Seiko Matsuda
16 February	"Cherry Blossom"	Seiko Matsuda
23 February	"Cherry Blossom"	Seiko Matsuda
2 March	"Cherry Blossom"	Seiko Matsuda
9 March	"Machikado Twilight"	Chanels
16 March	"Machikado Twilight"	Chanels
23 March	"Machikado Twilight"	Chanels
30 March	"Ruby no Yubiwa"	Akira Terao
6 April	"Ruby no Yubiwa"	Akira Terao
13 April	"Ruby no Yubiwa"	Akira Terao
20 April	"Ruby no Yubiwa"	Akira Terao
27 April	"Ruby no Yubiwa"	Akira Terao
4 May	"Ruby no Yubiwa"	Akira Terao
11 May	"Ruby no Yubiwa"	Akira Terao
18 May	"Ruby no Yubiwa"	Akira Terao
25 May	"Ruby no Yubiwa"	Akira Terao
1 June	"Ruby no Yubiwa"	Akira Terao
8 June	"Natsu no Tobira"	Seiko Matsuda
15 June	"Natsu no Tobira"	Seiko Matsuda
22 June	"Blue Jeans Memory"	Masahiko Kondō
29 June	"Blue Jeans Memory"	Masahiko Kondō
6 July	"Blue Jeans Memory"	Masahiko Kondō
13 July	"Nagai Yoru"	Chiharu Matsuyama
20 July	"Nagai Yoru"	Chiharu Matsuyama
27 July	"Nagai Yoru"	Chiharu Matsuyama
3 August	"Shiroi Parasol"	Seiko Matsuda
10 August	"Shiroi Parasol"	Seiko Matsuda
17 August	"Shiroi Parasol"	Seiko Matsuda
24 August	"High School Lullaby"	Imo-kin Trio
31 August	"High School Lullaby"	Imo-kin Trio
7 September	"High School Lullaby"	Imo-kin Trio
14 September	"High School Lullaby"	Imo-kin Trio
21 September	"High School Lullaby"	Imo-kin Trio
28 September	"High School Lullaby"	Imo-kin Trio
5 October	"High School Lullaby"	Imo-kin Trio
12 October	"Gingiragin ni Sarigenaku"	Masahiko Kondō
19 October	"Gingiragin ni Sarigenaku"	Masahiko Kondō
26 October	"Kaze Tachinu"	Seiko Matsuda
2 November	"Gingiragin ni Sarigenaku"	Masahiko Kondō
9 November	"Gingiragin ni Sarigenaku"	Masahiko Kondō
16 November	"Gingiragin ni Sarigenaku"	Masahiko Kondō
23 November	"Gingiragin ni Sarigenaku"	Masahiko Kondō
30 November	"Akujo"	Miyuki Nakajima
7 December	"Akujo"	Miyuki Nakajima
14 December	"Akujo"	Miyuki Nakajima
21 December	"Sailor Fuku to Kikanjū"	Hiroko Yakushimaru
28 December	"Sailor Fuku to Kikanjū"	Hiroko Yakushimaru

The Best Ten

The following reached number 1 on The Best Ten chart:

- 27 August: "Shiroi Parasol" - Seiko Matsuda

Music Labo

The following reached number 1 on the Music Labo chart:

- 15 June and 22 June: Hurricane by Chanels
- 10 August, 17 August and 24 August: Mamotte Agetai by Yumi Matsutoya

== Number one albums and LPs ==
Oricon

The following reached number 1 on the Oricon chart:

- 12 October, 19 October and 26 October: Tsukasa - Tsukasa Itou

Music Labo

The following reached number 1 on the Music Labo chart:

- 5 January, 2 February, 9 February and 16 February: We Are - Off Course
- 12 January, 19 January and 26 January: "Happy Date with the Nolans" or "Koi No Happy Date" (Japanese: 恋のハッピー・デート) - The Nolans
- 23 February, 2 March and 9 March: Bucchigiri Part II (Japanese: ぶっちぎりII) - Yokohama Ginbae
- 16 March: Neppu - Chage and Aska
- 23 March, 30 March, 6 April and 13 April: Ringetsu - Miyuki Nakajima
- 20 April, 27 April, 4 May, 11 May, 18 May, 25 May, 1 June, 8 June, 15 June, 22 June and 6 July: Reflections - Akira Terao
- 29 June: Toki O Koete - Chiharu Matsuyama
- 13 July and 20 July: Utsuroi - Masashi Sada
- 27 July and 3 August: Live at Whiskey A Go Go - Chanels
- 10 August, 17 August, 24 August and 31 August: Stereo Taiyo Zoku - Southern All Stars
- 7 September, 14 September, 21 September, 28 September, 5 October and 12 October: Selection 1978-1981 - Off Course
- 19 October and 26 October: Tsukasa - Tsukasa Itou
- 2 November and 9 November: Kaze Tachinu - Seiko Matsuda
- 16 November, 23 November and 30 November: Sakuban Oai Shimashou - Yumi Matsutoya
- 7 December and 14 December: Kishoutenketsu II - Chiharu Matsuyama
- 21 December: Over - Off Course

Cash Box of Japan

The following reached number 1 on the Cash Box of Japan chart:

- 10 January, 7 February and 14 February: Kogarashini Dakarete - Chiharu Matsuyama
- 31 January: Double Fantasy - John Lennon and Yoko Ono
- 21 February, 7 March and 21 March: We Are - Off Course
- 28 March and 4 April: Bucchigiri II (Japanese: ぶっちぎりII) - Yokohama Ginbae
- 11 April, 18 April, 25 April and 2 May: Ringetsu - Miyuki Nakajima
- 9 May: Heart & Soul - Chanels
- 23 May, 30 May, 6 June, 20 June, 27 June and 4 July: Reflections - Akira Terao
- 8 August: Utsuroi - Masashi Sada
- 15 August: Bucchigiri/Third (仏恥義理蹉䵷怒) (ぶっちぎりさあど) - Yokohama Ginbae
- 22 August: Live at Whiskey A Go Go - Chanels
- 5 September and 3 October: Stereo Taiyo Zoku - Southern All Stars
- 10 October, 24 October and 31 October: Selection 1978-1981 - Off Course
- 14 November: Tsukasa - Tsukasa Itou
- 12 December: Kaze Tachinu - Seiko Matsuda

== Annual charts ==
Akira Terao's Ruby no Yubiwa was number 1 in the Oricon annual singles chart.

== Film and television ==
The music of Station (1981), by Ryudo Uzaki, won the 36th Mainichi Film Award for Best Music (awarded in 1981), and the 5th Japan Academy Film Prize for Best Music (awarded in 1982).

Idol Punch was first broadcast on 4 April 1981. NHK Pops Hall was first broadcast on 7 April 1981. (Also translated "NHK Song Hall" and "NHK Kayo Hall").

The music of Urusei Yatsura includes Lum's Love Song.

== Compositions ==
- First version of Toward the Sea by Tōru Takemitsu

== Overseas ==
Eyes of the Mind, by Casiopea, reached number 33 on the Billboard Jazz LPs chart.

== Debuts ==
- Yuko Machida (Japanese: 街田祐子)

== Groups disbanded ==
Pink Lady disbanded on 31 March 1981.

== Other singles released ==
- Last Pretender and Oh! by Pink Lady
- Suzume by Keiko Masuda
- Orange Airmail Special and Lens Eye by Saki Kubota
- Cinderella Summer by Yuko Ishikawa
- 15 October: Hello Goodbye by Yoshie Kashiwabara

== Other albums released ==
- A Long Vacation by Eiichi Ohtaki
- Pink Lady and Sayonara Pink Lady by Pink Lady
- I My Mie by Mie
- BGM and Technodelic by Yellow Magic Orchestra
- Neuromantic by Yukihiro Takahashi
- Airmail Special by Saki Kubota
- Cross Point by Casiopea
- Potpourri by P-Model
- The Birthday Eve by Loudness
- Magic by T-Square
- The Rainbow Goblins and Alone by Masayoshi Takanaka

== History ==
The song Unazuki March by the Unazuki Trio was recorded on 14 November 1981.

The Sayonara Nichigeki Western Carnival (Japanese: サヨナラ日劇ウエスタン・カーニバル 〜 俺たちは走り続けている!) event took place in 1981. Cf. Nichigeki Western Carnival (1958 to 1977).

== See also ==
- Timeline of Japanese music
- 1981 in Japan
- 1981 in music
- w:ja:1981年の音楽
