= List of Oricon number-one singles of 1980 =

The highest-selling singles in Japan are ranked in the Oricon Singles Chart, which is published by Oricon Style magazine. The data are compiled by Oricon based on each singles' physical sales. This list includes the singles that reached the number one place on that chart in 1980.

== Oricon Weekly Singles Chart ==
Issue date	Song	Artist(s)	Ref.
January 7	"Ihōjin"	Sayuri Kume	
January 14	"Ihōjin"	Sayuri Kume	
January 21	"Ihōjin"	Sayuri Kume	
January 28	"Daitokai"	Crystal King	
February 4	"Daitokai"	Crystal King	
February 11	"Daitokai"	Crystal King	
February 18	"Daitokai"	Crystal King	
February 25	"Daitokai"	Crystal King	
March 3	"Daitokai"	Crystal King	
March 10	"Okuru Kotoba"	Kaientai	
March 17	"Okuru Kotoba"	Kaientai	
March 24	"Okuru Kotoba"	Kaientai	
March 31	"Okuru Kotoba"	Kaientai	
April 7	"Okuru Kotoba"	Kaientai	
April 14	"Okuru Kotoba"	Kaientai	
April 21	"Runaway"	Chanels	
April 28	"Runaway"	Chanels	
May 5	"Runaway"	Chanels	
May 12	"Runaway"	Chanels	
May 19	"Runaway"	Chanels	
May 26	"Runaway"	Chanels	
June 2	"Runaway"	Chanels	
June 9	"Dancing All Night"	Monta & Brothers	
June 16	"Dancing All Night"	Monta & Brothers	
June 23	"Dancing All Night"	Monta & Brothers	
June 30	"Dancing All Night"	Monta & Brothers	
July 7	"Dancing All Night"	Monta & Brothers	
July 14	"Dancing All Night"	Monta & Brothers	
July 21	"Dancing All Night"	Monta & Brothers	
July 28	"Dancing All Night"	Monta & Brothers	
August 4	"Dancing All Night"	Monta & Brothers	
August 11	"Dancing All Night"	Monta & Brothers	
August 18	"Junko / Namida no Serenade"	Tsuyoshi Nagabuchi	
August 25	"Junko / Namida no Serenade"	Tsuyoshi Nagabuchi	
September 1	"Junko / Namida no Serenade"	Tsuyoshi Nagabuchi	
September 8	"Junko / Namida no Serenade"	Tsuyoshi Nagabuchi	
September 15	"Junko / Namida no Serenade"	Tsuyoshi Nagabuchi	
September 22	"Junko / Namida no Serenade"	Tsuyoshi Nagabuchi	
September 29	"Hatto Shite! Good"	Toshihiko Tahara	
October 6	"Hatto Shite! Good"	Toshihiko Tahara	
October 13	"Kaze wa Aki Iro / Eighteen"	Seiko Matsuda	
October 20	"Kaze wa Aki Iro / Eighteen"	Seiko Matsuda	
October 27	"Kaze wa Aki Iro / Eighteen"	Seiko Matsuda	
November 3	"Kaze wa Aki Iro / Eighteen"	Seiko Matsuda	
November 10	"Kaze wa Aki Iro / Eighteen"	Seiko Matsuda	
November 17	"I'm In the Mood for Dancing"; Japanese title: "Dancing Sister" (ダンシング・シスター)	The Nolans	
November 24	"I'm In the Mood for Dancing"; Japanese title: "Dancing Sister" (ダンシング・シスター)	The Nolans	
December 1	"Koibito yo"	Mayumi Itsuwa	
December 8	"Koibito yo"	Mayumi Itsuwa	
December 15	"Koibito yo"	Mayumi Itsuwa	
December 22	"Sneaker Blues"	Masahiko Kondō	
December 29	"Sneaker Blues"	Masahiko Kondō	

== See also ==
- 1980 in Japanese music
