= Pink Lady (1981 album) =

Greatest hits album by Pink Lady
- Released: 21 March 1981
- Recorded: 1976–1981
- Genres: J-pop; kayōkyoku; disco; teen pop
- Language: Japanese
- Label: Victor

Pink Lady chronology
| Turning Point (1980) | Pink Lady (1981) | Sayonara Pink Lady (1981) |

Pink Lady (ピンク・レディー, Pinku Redī) is a three-record greatest hits album by Japanese duo Pink Lady. The album was released on March 21 1981, ten days before their farewell concert. It contains the duo's singles and B-sides from 1976 to 1981, as well as previously unreleased tracks. The original LP release featured a silver embossed sleeve and exclusive photos of the duo.

== Track listing ==
All lyrics are written by Yū Aku, except where indicated; all music is composed by and arranged by Shunichi Tokura, except where indicated.

Side A
| No. | Title | Length |
|---|---|---|
| 1. | "Pepper Keibu" (Peppā Keibu (ペッパー警部; "Inspector Pepper")) | 3:16 |
| 2. | "Kanpai Ojōsan" ((乾杯お嬢さん; "Cheers, Miss")) | 3:10 |
| 3. | "S.O.S." | 2:42 |
| 4. | "Pink no Ringo" (Pinku no Ringo (ピンクの林檎; "Pink Apple")) | 3:02 |
| 5. | "Carmen '77" (Karumen Nanajū-nana (カルメン '77)) | 3:36 |
| 6. | "Nagisa no Sindbad" (Nagisa no Shindobaddo (渚のシンドバッド; "Sindbad of the Beach")) | 2:34 |
| 7. | "Wanted (Shimei Tehai)" (Uonteddo (Shimei Tehai) (ウォンテッド（指名手配）; "Wanted (Fugitive Warrant)")) | 3:23 |

Side B
| No. | Title | Length |
|---|---|---|
| 1. | "UFO" | 3:13 |
| 2. | "Nigero Ojōsan" ((逃げろお孃さん; "Run Away, Miss")) | 2:39 |
| 3. | "Southpaw" (Sausupō (サウスポー)) | 3:37 |
| 4. | "Monster" (Monsutā (モンスター)) | 4:27 |
| 5. | "Tōmei Ningen" ((透明人間; "Invisible Person")) | 3:20 |
| 6. | "Super Monkey Son Goku" (Sūpā Monkī Son Gokū (スーパー・モンキー孫悟空)) | 2:54 |
| 7. | "Chameleon Army" (Kamereon Āmī (カメレオン・アーミー)) | 3:52 |

Side C
| No. | Title | Lyrics | Music | Arrangement | Length |
|---|---|---|---|---|---|
| 1. | "Hoshi kara Kita Futari" ((星から来た二人; "Two People from the Stars")) | | | | 2:47 |
| 2. | "Zipangu" (Jipangu (ジパング)) | | | | 3:28 |
| 3. | "Pink Typhoon (In the Navy)" (Pinku Taifūn (In the Navy) (ピンク・タイフーン（In the Navy）)) | Tomoko Okada | Jacques Morali; Henri Belolo; Victor Willis | Kazufumi Ōhama | 4:08 |
| 4. | "Milano Rose" (Mirano Rōzu (ミラノ・ローズ)) | Yoshiko Miura | Makoto Kawaguchi | Kawaguchi | 4:21 |
| 5. | "Body & Soul" | Chinfa Kan | Yūsuke Hoguchi | Masaki Matsubara | 4:35 |
| 6. | "Sugar Talk" (Shugā Tōku (シュガー・トーク)) | Kan | Hoguchi | Matsubara | 3:45 |
| 7. | "Nami Nori Pirates" (Nami Nori Pairētsu (波乗りパイレーツ; "Surfing Pirates")) | | | | 3:47 |

Side D
| No. | Title | Lyrics | Music | Arrangement | Length |
|---|---|---|---|---|---|
| 1. | "Kiss in the Dark" | Michael Lloyd | Lloyd | John D'Andrea | 2:58 |
| 2. | "Fantasia" (Fantajia (ファンタジア)) | Miura | Tatsushi Umegaki | Umegaki | 4:07 |
| 3. | "Arabia no Romance" (Arabia no Romansu (アラビアのロマンス; "Arabian Romance")) | Ayumi Date | Umegaki | Umegaki | 4:35 |
| 4. | "Young Love" (Yangu Rabu (ヤング・ラブ)) | R. Calstein; C. Merriam; Okada | Calstein; Merriam | Calstein; Merriam | 4:35 |
| 5. | "Nami Nori Pirates" (USA Version) | | | Paul Fauerso | 4:34 |
| 6. | "Monday Mona Lisa Club" (Mandē Mona Riza Kurabu (マンデー・モナリザ・クラブ)) | | | | 3:50 |
| 7. | "By Myself" | Yoshiko Miura | Kawaguchi | Kawaguchi | 4:22 |

Side E
| No. | Title | Lyrics | Music | Arrangement | Length |
|---|---|---|---|---|---|
| 1. | "Do Your Best" | Shizuka Ijūin | | | 4:09 |
| 2. | "Ai Giri Giri" ((愛・GIRI GIRI; "Last Minute Love")) | Ijūin | Yūichirō Oda | Ryō Kawakami | 4:13 |
| 3. | "Kibō e no Senritsu" ((希望への旋律; "A Melody to Hope")) | Kazu Katagiri | Kawaguchi | Kawaguchi | 4:39 |
| 4. | "Sekai Eiyushi" ((世界英雄史; "World History of Heroes")) | Akira Itō | Kawaguchi | Kawaguchi | 4:13 |
| 5. | "Utakata" ((うたかた; "Bubble")) | Miura | Lloyd | Kawaguchi | 3:25 |
| 6. | "Virgin" (Bājin (バージン)) | Date | Kōji Makaino | Makaino | 4:24 |
| 7. | "Koi wa Kakehiki" ((恋はかけひき; "Love Is Over")) | Keiko Nakamoto; Akira Itō | Kawaguchi | Kawaguchi | 4:38 |

Side F
| No. | Title | Lyrics | Music | Arrangement | Length |
|---|---|---|---|---|---|
| 1. | "Sherlock Holmes no Suteki na Koi" (Shārokku Hōmuzu no Suteki na Koi (シャーロック・ホームズの素敵な恋; "Lovely Sherlock Holmes")) | Itō | Kawaguchi | Kawaguchi | 3:40 |
| 2. | "California Blue" (Kariforunia Burū (カリフォルニア・ブルー)) | Itō | Kawaguchi | Kawaguchi | 4:50 |
| 3. | "AMENIC (Gyakukaiten no Cinema)" (Amenikku (Gyakukaiten no Shinema) (AMENIC（逆回転のシネマ）; "Amenic (Counter-clockwise Cinema)")) | Shigesato Itoi | Shigeru Umebayashi | EX | 2:56 |
| 4. | "Remember (Fame)" (Rimenbā (Fēmu) (リメンバー (フェーム))) | Rei Nakanishi | Michael Gore; Dean Pitchford | Umegaki | 4:14 |
| 5. | "Last Pretender" | Itoi | Itoi | Yukihiro Takahashi | 3:37 |
| 6. | "Muchū ga Ichiban Utsukushī" ((夢中がいちばん美しい; "The Most Beautiful Crazy")) | | | | 4:21 |
| 7. | "OH!" | | | | 4:56 |

== Charts ==
| Chart (1981) | Peak position |
|---|---|
| Japan Oricon Albums Chart | 25 |

== See also ==
- 1981 in Japanese music
