= List of Oricon number-one singles of 1979 =

The highest-selling singles in Japan are ranked in the Oricon Singles Chart, which is published by Oricon Style magazine. The data are compiled by Oricon based on each singles' physical sales. This list includes the singles that reached the number one place on that chart in 1979.

== Oricon Weekly Singles Chart ==
Issue date	Song	Artist(s)	Ref.
January 1	"Chameleon Army"	Pink Lady	
January 8	"Chameleon Army"	Pink Lady	
January 15	"Chameleon Army"	Pink Lady	
January 22	"Chameleon Army"	Pink Lady	
January 29	"Champion"	Alice	
February 5	"Champion"	Alice	
February 12	"Champion"	Alice	
February 19	"Champion"	Alice	
February 26	"Hero (Hero ni Naru Toki, Sore wa Ima)"	Kai Band	
March 5	"Hero (Hero ni Naru Toki, Sore wa Ima)"	Kai Band	
March 12	"Young Man (Y.M.C.A.)"	Hideki Saijo	
March 19	"Young Man (Y.M.C.A.)"	Hideki Saijo	
March 26	"Young Man (Y.M.C.A.)"	Hideki Saijo	
April 2	"Young Man (Y.M.C.A.)"	Hideki Saijo	
April 9	"Young Man (Y.M.C.A.)"	Hideki Saijo	
April 16	"Miserarete"	Judy Ongg	
April 23	"Miserarete"	Judy Ongg	
April 30	"Miserarete"	Judy Ongg	
May 7	"Miserarete"	Judy Ongg	
May 14	"Miserarete"	Judy Ongg	
May 21	"Miserarete"	Judy Ongg	
May 28	"Miserarete"	Judy Ongg	
June 4	"Miserarete"	Judy Ongg	
June 11	"Miserarete"	Judy Ongg	
June 18	"Kimi no Asa"	Satoshi Kishida	
June 25	"Kimi no Asa"	Satoshi Kishida	
July 2	"Kimi no Asa"	Satoshi Kishida	
July 9	"Kimi no Asa"	Satoshi Kishida	
July 16	"Kimi no Asa"	Satoshi Kishida	
July 23	"Omoide-zake"	Sachiko Kobayashi	
July 30	"Kanpaku Sengen"	Masashi Sada	
August 6	"Kanpaku Sengen"	Masashi Sada	
August 13	"Kanpaku Sengen"	Masashi Sada	
August 20	"Kanpaku Sengen"	Masashi Sada	
August 27	"Kanpaku Sengen"	Masashi Sada	
September 3	"Kanpaku Sengen"	Masashi Sada	
September 10	"Kanpaku Sengen"	Masashi Sada	
September 17	"Kanpaku Sengen"	Masashi Sada	
September 24	"Kanpaku Sengen"	Masashi Sada	
October 1	"Kanpaku Sengen"	Masashi Sada	
October 8	"Sexual Violet No. 1"	Masahiro Kuwana	
October 15	"Sexual Violet No. 1"	Masahiro Kuwana	
October 22	"Sexual Violet No. 1"	Masahiro Kuwana	
October 29	"Oyaji no Ichiban Nagai Hi"	Masashi Sada	
November 5	"Oyaji no Ichiban Nagai Hi"	Masashi Sada	
November 12	"Oyaji no Ichiban Nagai Hi"	Masashi Sada	
November 19	"Oyaji no Ichiban Nagai Hi"	Masashi Sada	
November 26	"Oyaji no Ichiban Nagai Hi"	Masashi Sada	
December 3	"Oyaji no Ichiban Nagai Hi"	Masashi Sada	
December 10	"Ihōjin"	Sayuri Kume	
December 17	"Ihōjin"	Sayuri Kume	
December 24	"Ihōjin"	Sayuri Kume	
December 31	"Ihōjin"	Sayuri Kume	

== See also ==
- 1979 in Japanese music
