= Sayonara Pink Lady =

Sayonara Pink Lady at Kohrakuen Stadium

Live album by Pink Lady
- Released: 5 December 1981
- Recorded: 31 March 1981
- Venue: Korakuen Stadium
- Genre: J-pop; kayōkyoku; disco; teen pop
- Language: Japanese
- Label: Victor
- Producer: Hisahiko Iida

Pink Lady chronology
Pink Lady (1980)	Sayonara Pink Lady at Kohrakuen Stadium (1981)	Suspense ~Pink Lady Again~ (1984)

Sayonara Pink Lady at Kohrakuen Stadium (さよならピンク・レディー, Sayonara Pinku Redī) is the seventh and final live album by Japanese idol duo Pink Lady, released on December 5, 1981. Recorded live at Korakuen Stadium in Tokyo on March 31, 1981, the album featured the duo's last live performance before their disbandment that year.

The album has not been reissued since its release on CD on December 1, 1994.

== Track listing ==
All lyrics are written by Yū Aku, except where indicated; all music is composed by Shunichi Tokura, except where indicated

Side A
No.	Title	Length
1.	""Opening ~ Hoshi kara Kita Futari" (オープニング~星から来た二人, Ōpuningu ~ Hoshi kara Kita Futari, "Opening ~ Two People from the Stars")"
2.	"Medley (メドレー, Medorē): "Kanpai Ojōsan" (乾杯お嬢さん, "Cheers, Miss"); "Pink no Ringo" (ピンクの林檎, Pinku no Ringo, "Pink Apple"); "Pipe no Kaijin" (パイプの怪人, Paipu no Kaijin, "Phantom of the Pipe"); "Nigero Ojōsan" (逃げろお孃さん, "Run Away, Miss"); "Lady X" (レディーX, Redī Ekkusu)"
3.	"Monster (モンスター, Monsutā)"
4.	"Tōmei Ningen (透明人間, "Invisible Person")"
5.	"Chameleon Army (カメレオン・アーミー, Kamereon Āmī)"

Side B
No.	Title	Lyrics	Music	Length
1.	"OH!"
2.	""Good Bye Song" (グッド・バイ・ソング, Guddo Bai Songu)"	Kazuo Funaki	Kei Wakakusa
3.	"Hotaru no Hikari (蛍の光, "Glow of a Firefly")"	Chiaki Inagaki	Traditional
4.	"Strings Medley (ストリングス・メドレー, Sutoringusu Medorē): "Wanted (Shimei Tehai)" (ウォンテッド（指名手配）, Uonteddo (Shimei Tehai), "Wanted (Fugitive Warrant)"); "Carmen '77" (カルメン '77, Karumen Nanajū-nana); S.O.S.; "Pepper Keibu" (ペッパー警部, Peppā Keibu, "Inspector Pepper"); "Southpaw" (サウスポー, Sausupō)" (Instrumental)

== See also ==
- 1981 in Japanese music
