= Last Pretender =

Single by Pink Lady

from the album Pink Lady
- Language: Japanese
- B-side: "AMENIC (Gyakukaiten no Cinema)"
- Released: January 21, 1981
- Genre: J-pop; new wave
- Length: 3:40
- Label: Victor
- Songwriter: Shigesato Itoi

Pink Lady singles chronology
"Remember (Fame)" (1980)	"Last Pretender" (1981)	"OH!" (1981)

"Last Pretender" (ラスト・プリテンダー, Rasuto Puritendā) is Pink Lady's 21st single, released on January 21, 1981. The single failed to be a hit, peaking at 85 in the Oricon charts. It was never promoted on television, nor was it ever performed live by the duo.

The song sold 100,000 copies.

In 2018, the song was performed live for the first time by Mie during her "Ura Pink 2" (裏ピンク２, Ura Pinku Tsū; "Back to Pink 2") show at Blues Alley Japan.

== Track listing ==
All lyrics are written by Shigesato Itoi.

No.	Title	Music	Arrangement	Length
1.	"Last Pretender"	Yukihiro Takahashi	Yukihiro Takahashi	3:40
2.	"AMENIC (Gyakukaiten no Cinema)" ((AMENIC（逆回転のシネマ）; "Amenic (Counter-clockwise Cinema)"))	Shigeru Umebayashi	EX

== Charts ==
Chart (1981)	Peak position
Japanese Oricon Singles Chart	85

== See also ==
- 1981 in Japanese music
