= Oh! (Pink Lady song) =

Single by Pink Lady

from the album Pink Lady
- Language: Japanese
- B-side: "Muchū ga Ichiban Utsukushī"
- Released: March 5, 1981
- Genre: J-pop
- Length: 5:00
- Label: Victor
- Composer: Shunichi Tokura
- Lyricist: Yū Aku
- Producer: Hisahiko Iida

Pink Lady singles chronology
"Last Pretender" (1981)	"Oh!" (1981)	"Fushigi Love" (1984)

Oh! is the 22nd single of Japanese duo Pink Lady and last official single before their disbandment. The single was released on March 5, 1981. It was written by Shunichi Tokura and Yū Aku, who were behind the duo's most successful hits during the 1970s. The song sold 200,000 copies.

== Track listing ==
All lyrics are written by Yū Aku; all music is composed and arranged by Shunichi Tokura.

No.	Title	Length
1.	"Oh!"	5:00
2.	"Muchū ga Ichiban Utsukushī" ((夢中がいちばん美しい; "The Most Beautiful Craziness"))

== Charts ==
Chart (1981)	Peak position
Japanese Oricon Singles Chart	46

== Cover versions ==
- The tribute group Pink Babies covered the song in their "UFO" Type-B single in 2017. Their version of "Muchū ga Ichiban Utsukushī" is included in the Type-A release of the single.

== See also ==
- 1981 in Japanese music
