= Cherry Blossom (Seiko Matsuda song) =

Single by Seiko Matsuda

from the album Silhouette
- Language: Japanese
- B-side: "Sukoshizutsu Haru"
- Released: January 21, 1981
- Genre: J-pop; kayōkyoku
- Length: 3:23
- Label: CBS/Sony
- Composer: Kazuo Zaitsu
- Lyricist: Yoshiko Miura

Seiko Matsuda singles chronology
"Kaze wa Akiiro / Eighteen"	"Cherry Blossom"	"Natsu no Tobira"

Audio video
- "Cherry Blossom" on YouTube

"Cherry Blossom" (Japanese: チェリーブラッサム) is a song recorded by Japanese idol singer Seiko Matsuda, released as her fourth single on January 21, 1981. It reached number 1 on the Oricon Weekly Singles Chart, and sold approximately 676,000 copies.

== Background ==
"Cherry Blossom" was written by Yoshiko Miura, who had written lyrics for all of Matsuda's previous singles, and composed by singer-songwriter Kazuo Zaitsu, lead singer of the Japanese rock band Tulip. Zaitsu, often referred to as the "Japanese Paul McCartney", had little experience writing music for idol singers, and his songwriting brought a more rock-influenced sound to "Cherry Blossom" compared to Matsuda's previous singles. The song's arrangement was done by Masaaki Omura.

The single's B-side, "Sukoshizutsu Haru" (少しずつ春; lit. 'Spring, Little by Little'), was written by Miura and composed by Yuichiro Oda. Miura and Oda had together written and composed all of Matsuda's previous singles.

== Release and reception ==
"Cherry Blossom" was released as a single on January 21, 1981. It peaked at number 1 on the Oricon Weekly Singles Chart, and charted for 17 weeks in total. It sold approximately 676,000 copies.

On March 26, 1981, Matsuda performed "Cherry Blossom" on the music ranking show The Best Ten. That week, the song was ranked at number 5 on the show's rankings. Matsuda's performance was broadcast during a brief stop at Shizuoka Station, moments after she stepped off of a Shinkansen train. Matsuda finished the performance from inside the train after hurriedly boarding it before its departure. The performance became a well-remembered moment from the show.

== Legacy ==
Idol group AKB48 member Yui Oguri covered "Cherry Blossom" for the group's first cover album, Nantettatte AKB48, released on December 25, 2024.

"Cherry Blossom" was used in the opening scene of the first episode of the NHK drama series Blossom, which aired on September 28, 2026.

== Charts ==
Chart (1980)	Peak position
Japan (Oricon)	1

== See also ==
- 1981 in Japanese music
