= Hadashi no Kisetsu =

Single by Seiko Matsuda

from the album Squall
- Language: Japanese
- English title: Barefoot Season
- B-side: "Rainbow ~六月生まれ"
- Released: April 1, 1980
- Recorded: February 1980
- Genre: J-pop; kayōkyoku
- Length: 3:45
- Label: CBS/Sony
- Composer: Yuichiro Oda
- Lyricist: Yoshiko Miura

Seiko Matsuda singles chronology
"Hadashi no Kisetsu"	"Aoi Sangoshou"

Audio video
- "Hadashi no Kisetsu" on YouTube

"Hadashi no Kisetsu" (Japanese: 裸足の季節; lit. 'Barefoot Season') is a song recorded in February 1980 by Japanese idol singer Seiko Matsuda, released as her debut single on April 1, 1980. It peaked at number 12 on the Oricon charts, and sold approximately 300,000 copies.

== Background ==
In 1978, Matsuda won the Miss Seventeen singing contest, which was held by CBS/Sony in collaboration with teen fashion and culture magazine Seventeen. After Matsuda's win, CBS/Sony producer Muneo Wakamatsu was reviewing cassette tapes that were recorded by each contestant. Upon hearing Matsuda's tape, which contained a recording of her singing a cover of Junko Sakurada's "Kimagure Venus", Wakamatsu decided to pitch her as a potential idol singer.

Wakamatsu travelled to Fukuoka, Matsuda's hometown, to meet her and get her signed to a talent agency. Despite strong opposition from Matsuda's father and talent agencies expressing doubt that Matsuda would be a successful idol, Matsuda ultimately signed with the talent agency Sun Music.

In February 1980, Matsuda recorded "Hadashi no Kisetsu". The song was composed by Yuichiro Oda, with lyrics by Yoshiko Miura. Wakamatsu recalls Matsuda bursting into tears during the recording, as she was overwhelmed with joy to be debuting after two years of inactivity. Wakamatsu also deliberately chose an imperfect take of the song for the final release, as he believed that a less rehearsed sound would endear Matsuda's voice to listeners.

== Release and reception ==
"Hadashi no Kisetsu" was released as a single on April 1, 1980. It peaked at number 12 on the Oricon Weekly Singles Chart, charting for 11 weeks in total, and sold approximately 300,000 copies.

=== "Ekubo" advertisement ===
"Hadashi no Kisetsu" was to be used in a television advertisement for cosmetics company Shiseido's "Ekubo" facial cleanser. Matsuda was to feature in the advertisement alongside the song. However, due to the product's name, "Ekubo", meaning "dimples" in Japanese, Shiseido wanted a model who had dimples, which Matsuda lacked. This led to the advertising deal nearly falling through, until a producer from advertising company Hakuhodo, representing Matsuda, pushed for the song to be used in the advertisement.

While "Hadashi no Kisetsu" was used in the advertisement, Matsuda herself was not featured, ultimately being replaced by singer and actress Yukiko Yamada. Matsuda was initially uncredited, and some viewers thought that Yamada was the song's vocalist. Due to rising intrigue regarding the identity of the singer, Matsuda's name was added to the advertisement, which boosted sales of the single.

== Legacy ==
Prior to Matsuda's debut, at the end of the 1970s, popular idol singer Momoe Yamaguchi, also under CBS/Sony, announced that she would be retiring from the music industry. The popular group Candies had disbanded. Popular duo Pink Lady had experienced a decline in popularity. Matsuda's debut with "Hadashi no Kisetsu" and subsequent rise in popularity at this time lead to her being referred to as Yamaguchi's successor, and marked a shift towards new trends in Japanese idol music in the 1980s, with composer Oda bringing his Western pop music influences to Matsuda's early singles.

== Charts ==
Chart (1980)	Peak position
Japan (Oricon)	12

== See also ==
- 1980 in Japanese music
