= Kyoritsu Women's Junior College =

Japanese private women's college

Coordinates: 35°41′36.7″N 139°45′28.8″E

- 共立女子短期大学
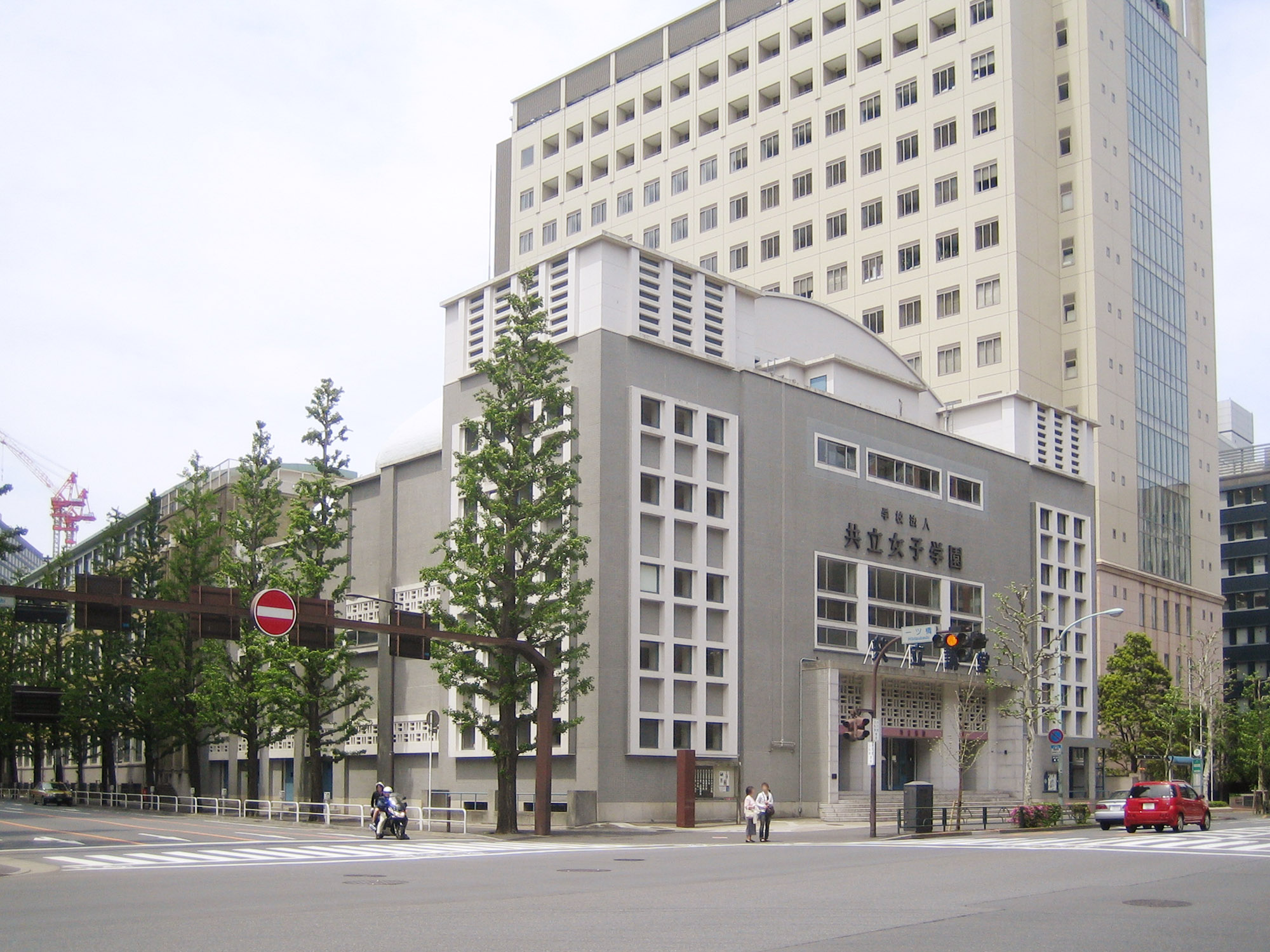
- Type: private
- Established: 1950
- Location: Chiyoda, Tokyo, Japan
- Website: http://www.kyoritsu-wu.ac.jp/

Kyoritsu Women's Junior College (共立女子短期大学, Kyoritsu Joshi Tanki Daigaku) is a private junior Colleges in Chiyoda, Tokyo, Japan. It is one of the 149 junior colleges in Japan set up in 1950 when the junior college system started. It consists of two departments now.

== Department and Graduate Course ==
=== Departments ===
- Department of Life Sciences
- Department of Literature

=== Available certifications ===
- Junior High School Teacher's License (2nd Class) in Japanese, English, Home Economics
- High School Teacher's License (2nd Class) in Japanese, English and Home Economics

== Alumni ==
Alumni of the college include:

- Sayuri Kume, also known as Saki Kubota
- Ayaka Shiomura, politician

== See also ==
- List of junior colleges in Japan
