= Remember (Pink Lady song) =

"Remember (Fame)"

Single by Pink Lady

from the album Pink Lady
- Language: Japanese
- B-side: "Cattleya no Corsage"
- Released: December 5, 1980
- Genre: J-pop; post-disco
- Length: 4:15
- Label: Victor
- Composers: Michael Gore; Dean Pitchford
- Lyricist: Rei Nakanishi

Pink Lady singles chronology
"Utakata" (1980)	"Remember (Fame)" (1980)	"Last Pretender" (1981)

"Remember (Fame)" (リメンバー (フェーム), Rimenbā (Fēmu)) is the 20th single of Japanese duo Pink Lady, released on 7" vinyl on December 5, 1980. The song is a Japanese-language cover of the hit song "Fame" by Irene Cara.

The song sold 100,000 copies.

"Cattleya's Corsage", the single's B-side, was previously used as a commercial jingle for Cow Brand's Showerun Treatment 7 shampoo.

== Track listing ==
All arrangement by Tatsushi Umegaki.

No.	Title	Lyrics	Music	Length
1.	"Remember (Fame)" (Rimenbā (Fēmu) (リメンバー (フェーム)))	Rei Nakanishi	Michael Gore; Dean Pitchford	4:15
2.	"Cattleya's Corsage" (Katorea no Kosāji (カトレアのコサージ))	Kimio Kudō	Tatsushi Umegaki

== Chart positions ==
Chart (1980)	Peak position
Japanese Oricon Singles Chart	86

== See also ==
- 1980 in Japanese music
