= Ayaka Shiomura =

Japanese politician

- 塩村 文夏
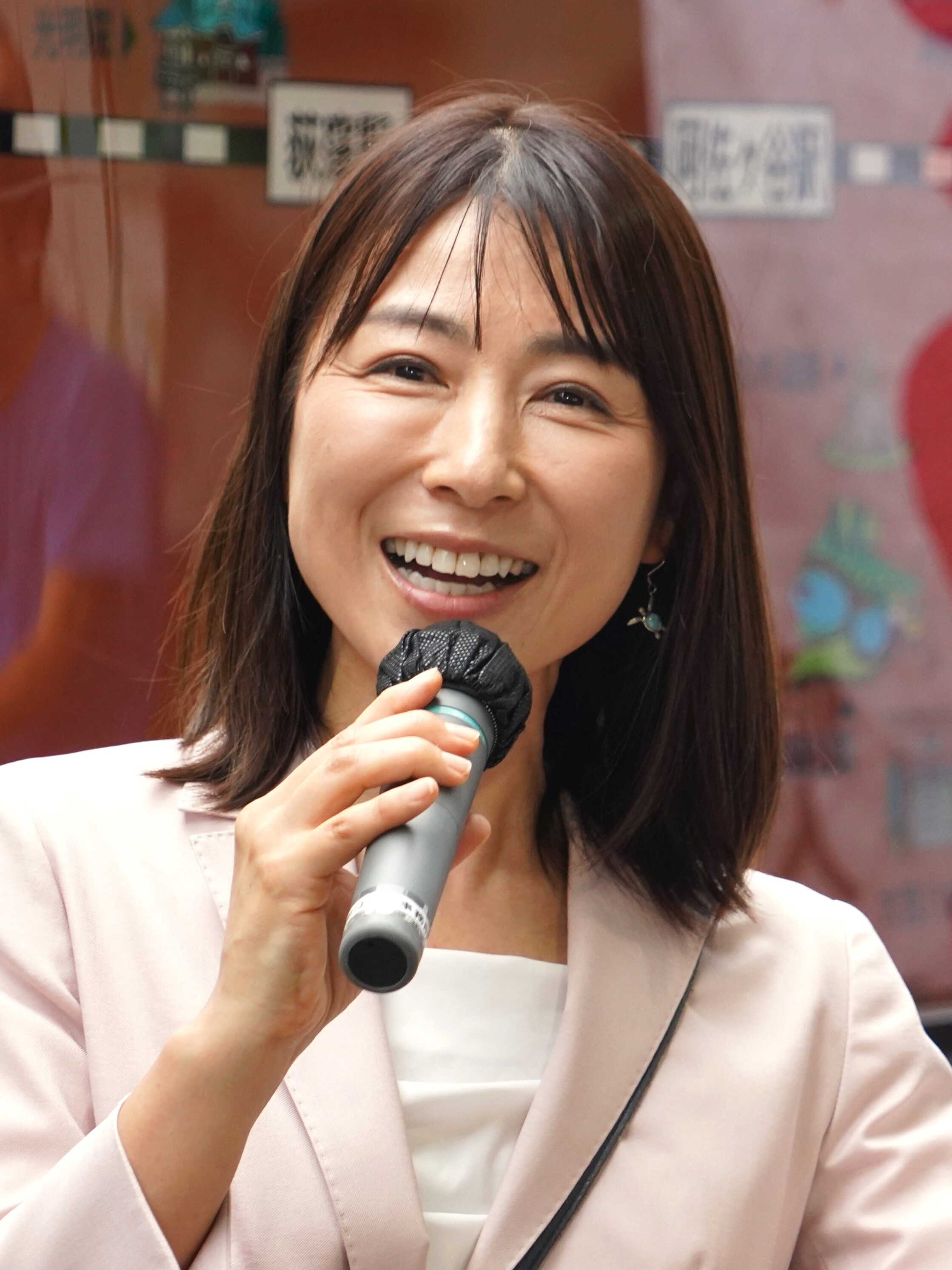
- Shiomura in 2024

Senator of Japan
- Incumbent
- Assumed office 29 July 2019
- Preceded by: Taro Yamamoto
- Constituency: Tokyo at-large

Member of the Tokyo Metropolitan Assembly
- In office 23 July 2013 – 22 July 2017
- Constituency: Setagaya Ward

Personal details
- Born: 6 July 1978 (age 48) Fukuyama, Hiroshima, Japan
- Party: CDP (since 2018)
- Other political affiliations: YP (2013–2014); Independent (2014–2016); DP (2016–2017); DPP (2017–2018)
- Education: Kyoritsu Women's Junior College

Ayaka Shiomura (塩村 文夏, Shiomura Ayaka) (born July 6, 1978) is a Japanese politician who is a member of the Senate of Japan.

== Biography ==
She was born on July 6, 1978 in Hiroshima Prefecture and attended Kyoritsu Women's Junior College, graduating in 1999. She had studied abroad in Australia. During her career, she worked as a freelance writer for multiple TV and radio information programs before her 2013 election to the Tokyo Metropolitan Assembly. In 2014, during a debate about childrearing, she was heckled by an unnamed member. In 2019, she was elected to the House of Councillors.
