= Turning Point (Pink Lady album) =

Compilation album by Pink Lady
- Released: 5 December 1980
- Recorded: 1976–1980
- Genres: J-pop; kayōkyoku; disco; teen pop
- Languages: Japanese; English
- Label: Victor

Pink Lady chronology
We Are Sexy (1979)	Turning Point (1980)	Pink Lady (1981)

Singles from Turning Point
- 1. "Sekai Eiyushi" Released: 21 May 1980; 2. "Utakata" Released: 21 September 1980

Turning Point (ターニング・ポイント, Tāningu Pointo) is a compilation album by the Japanese duo Pink Lady, released on December 5, 1980. It features the new song "Sekai Eiyushi".

== Track listing ==
All lyrics are written by Yū Aku, except where indicated; all music is composed by and arranged by Shunichi Tokura, except where indicated.

Side A
No.	Title	Lyrics	Music	Arrangement	Length
1.	"Utakata" ((うたかた; "Bubble"))	Yoshiko Miura	Michael Lloyd	Makoto Kawaguchi
2.	"Sekai Eiyushi" ((世界英雄史; "World History of Heroes"))	Akira Itō	Kawaguchi	Kawaguchi
3.	"Nagisa no Sindbad" (Nagisa no Shindobaddo (渚のシンドバッド; "Sindbad of the Beach"))
4.	"Kiss in the Dark"	Lloyd	Lloyd	John D'Andrea
5.	"Monday Mona Lisa Club" (Mandē Mona Riza Kurabu (マンデー・モナリザ・クラブ))
6.	"Pink Typhoon (In the Navy)" (Pinku Taifūn (In za Nebī) (ピンク・タイフーン（In the Navy）))	Tomoko Okada	Jacques Morali; Henri Belolo; Victor Willis	Kazufumi Ōhama

Side B
No.	Title	Length
1.	"UFO"
2.	"Chameleon Army" (Kamereon Āmī (カメレオン・アーミー))
3.	"Carmen '77" (Karumen Nanajū-nana (カルメン '77))
4.	"Nami Nori Pirates" (Nami Nori Pairētsu (波乗りパイレーツ; "Surfing Pirates"))
5.	"Wanted (Shimei Tehai)" (Uonteddo (Shimei Tehai) (ウォンテッド（指名手配）; "Wanted (Fugitive Warrant)"))
6.	"Southpaw" (Sausupō (サウスポー))
7.	"Pepper Keibu" (Peppā Keibu (ペッパー警部; "Inspector Pepper"))

== Charts ==
Chart (1980)	Peak position
Japanese Oricon Albums Chart	52

== See also ==
- 1980 in Japanese music
