= Sekai Eiyushi =

1980 song performed by Pink Lady

Single by Pink Lady

from the album Turning Point
- Language: Japanese
- English title: World History of Heroes
- B-side: "The Chūsingura '80"
- Released: May 21, 1980
- Genre: J-pop; pop rock
- Length: 4:13
- Label: Victor
- Composer: Makoto Kawaguchi
- Lyricist: Akira Itō

Pink Lady singles chronology
"Ai Giri Giri" (1980)	"Sekai Eiyushi" (1980)	"Utakata" (1980)

"Sekai Eiyushi" (世界英雄史; lit. "World History of Heroes") is Pink Lady's 18th single, released on May 21, 1980. At the time of the single's release, the duo returned to Japan after failing to make a mark in the U.S. with their ill-fated variety show. At the same time, rumors started circulating about Pink Lady's disbandment, which was denied by the duo until they made an official announcement in a press conference on September 1.

The single sold 150,000 copies.

== Track listing (7" vinyl) ==
All lyrics are written by Akira Itō; all music is composed and arranged by Makoto Kawaguchi.

No.	Title	Length
1.	"Sekai Eiyushi" ((世界英雄史; "World History of Heroes"))	4:13
2.	"The Chūshingura '80" (Za Chūsingura Eiti (ザ・忠臣蔵'80))

== Chart positions ==
Chart (1980)	Peak position
Japanese Oricon Singles Chart	45

== See also ==
- 1980 in Japanese music
