= Utakata (song) =

Single by Pink Lady

from the album Turning Point
- Language: Japanese
- English title: Bubble
- B-side: "By Myself"
- Released: September 21, 1980
- Genre: J-pop; disco
- Length: 7:42
- Label: Victor
- Composer: Michael Lloyd
- Lyricist: Yoshiko Miura

Pink Lady singles chronology
"Sekai Eiyushi" (1980)	"Utakata" (1980)	"Remember (Fame)" (1980)

"Utakata" (うたかた; lit. "Bubble") is Pink Lady's 19th single release, and was released on May 21, 1980. This song was a Japanese version of "Strangers When We Kiss", a song which they recorded for their American debut album Kiss in the Dark.

On September 1, 1980, the duo held a press conference to announce their disbandment by March 1981, as well as the release of their four final singles. "Utakata" was the first of these four to be released after the announcement.

The song sold 250,000 copies.

== Track listing (7" vinyl) ==
All lyrics are written by Yoshiko Miura; all arrangement by Makoto Kawaguchi.

No.	Title	Music	Length
1.	"Utakata" ((うたかた; "Bubble"))	Michael Lloyd	3:21
2.	"By Myself"	Makoto Kawaguchi	4:21

== Chart positions ==
Chart (1980)	Peak position
Japanese Oricon Singles Chart	48

== See also ==
- 1980 in Japanese music
