= Ihojin =

1979 song by Saki Kubota

Single by Saki Kubota
- Language: Japanese
- B-side: "Yumehiko"
- Released: 1 October 1979
- Genre: New music
- Length: 3:41
- Label: CBS/Sony
- Songwriter: Saki Kubota
- Producer: Masatoshi Sakai

Saki Kubota singles chronology
"Ihojin" (1979)	"Nijūgoji" (1980)

Music video
- "Ihojin" on YouTube

Ihojin (Japanese: 異邦人) (English: "Stranger" or "Foreigner") is a song written and composed by Saki Kubota, and first performed by her. The song was first released as a single on 1 October 1979. That recording sold more than 1.4 million copies and reached number 1 in the Japanese singles chart. The song was used in the "Silk Road" television commercial for Sanyo.

The version released on 12/7/2006 was certified platinum by the Recording Industry Association of Japan in May 2019.

A cover version of the song by Tak Matsumoto, featuring Zard, reached number 3 in the Oricon Singles Chart in 2003.

TV Tokyo included the song in a collection of one hundred songs that are so well known that anyone could recognise them in three seconds. In 2022, it was among the most popular 1970s Japanese songs on Spotify.

The song is in the new music genre.

== Lyrics ==
The lyrics of the song refer to children playing in an open space adjacent to the railway tracks, as seen by a passenger from the window of a railway train travelling on the Chuo Line. The lyrics of "Ihojin" include the motif of time travel that previously appeared in the Shinji Harada song "Time Travel" (Japanese: タイム・トラベル) (1978).

== Saki Kubota ==
The single released by Saki Kubota was a hit song.

Weekly charts: The single reached number 1 in The Best Ten chart, the Oricon Singles Chart, the Music Labo singles chart, and the Cash Box of Japan 45s chart. The single spent three consecutive weeks at the top of The Best Ten chart. The single spent 12 consecutive weeks in The Best Ten. The single spent seven consecutive weeks at the top of the Oricon chart, and spent 25 weeks in the Oricon chart. The single was the first debut song to reach number 1 on The Best Ten chart.

Monthly charts: The single was number 1 in the Oricon monthly singles chart for December 1979 and January 1980.

Annual charts: The single was number 2 in the Oricon annual singles chart for 1980.

Decade charts: The single was number 10 in the Oricon 1970s singles chart, with sales of 1,445,000.

The recording of the song released as a single in 1979 is included in the album Yumegatari. The album Saudade, released in 1980, included a new acoustic version of the song recorded in Lisbon in Portugal.

The 1979 single was released on a 7-inch 45rpm vinyl record on the CBS/Sony label. The subtitle of the song "Ihojin" is "Shiruku Rōdo No Tēma" (Japanese: シルクロードのテーマ) which means "Silk Road Theme". The duration of "Ihojin" is 3 minutes and 41 seconds. The song "Yumehiko" (Japanese: 夢飛行) (English: "Dream Flight") is on the B side of the single. The duration of "Yumehiko" is 4 minutes and 11 seconds. The song "Ihojin" was arranged by Mitsuo Hagita and produced by Masatoshi Sakai.

Saki Kubota's backing band included Satoshi Takebe.

The first appearance of Saki Kubota on The Best Ten was on 13 December 1979.

The song uses the lament bass as a bridge passage.

Makaino said the arrangement is full of exoticism ("ikoku jōcho", Japanese: 異国情緒, the mood of a foreign country).

An animated music video was created by Harune Sato and Kohei Saito from the Tokyo University of the Arts in 2021. The video includes three dimensional art.

The song is included in the soundtrack of Mirai no Omoide: Last Christmas (1992).

There are karaoke versions of both the Yumegatari version, and the (Portuguese recording) Saudade version, of "Ihojin" on the album Golden Best Saki Kubota. "Ihojin" reached number 10 in the Joysound karaoke rankings for Shōwa era songs in the first half of 2024. The song has appeared in the Joysound karaoke annual rankings by age group, and in an NTV karaoke survey ranking by age group. In 2024, it reached number 14 in the Joysound karaoke ranking for Shōwa era songs sung by Japanese people in their 10s and 20s, and number 12 for people born in the Heisei era.

According to ITmedia, in 2024, "Ihojin" was the most popular song from 1980 to 1982 amongst Japanese people in their 50s and 60s, in their 60s, in their 50s, and in their 40s and 50s. It was the fourth most popular for people in their 30s and 40s, and also ranked highly for women. According to the Sankei Shimbun, it was the eighth most popular song amongst folk, rock and pop (fōku, rokku and poppusu) songs from the Shōwa era. It was the sixth most popular among women, and the tenth most popular among men. According to TV Asahi, it was the most popular song amongst breakthrough songs of the Shōwa era. According to a 2019 survey, it is the 22nd best song. In 2025, it was top of the Asahi Shimbun's "be ranking" of 1980s songs.

Akina Nakamori, speaking of the song "Sand Beige (Sabaku e)" (1985), said she asked to be given a song with the kind of exotic mood (ikoku jōcho) possessed by "Ihojin". The song "Ihojin" was praised by Yoko Minamino. Aming's song "Matsu wa" has been compared to "Ihojin".

== Cover versions ==
=== Tak Matsumoto, featuring Zard ===
"Ihojin"

Single by Tak Matsumoto featuring Zard
- Language: Japanese
- B-side: "Ame No Machi Wo"
- Released: 27 August 2003
- Label: Vermillion Records
- Songwriter: Saki Kubota

This single spent 16 weeks in the Oricon chart, and was certified gold by the Recording Industry Association of Japan in August 2003.

The song on the B side is a cover version of Yuming's "Ame No Machi Wo" (Japanese: 雨の街を) by Tak Matsumoto, featuring Akiko Matsuda. The song "Ihojin" was included in the Tak Matsumoto album The Hit Parade.

=== Other ===
As of 2021, "Ihojin" was the joint 6th most frequently covered Shōwa era pop song (昭和ポップス), with 68 cover versions, according to TBS.

There are cover versions by Hiroko Kasahara (1990), Yukana Nogami (1997), Akina Nakamori (2002), Tatsuya Ishii (2003), Yuki Koyanagi (2003), Hideaki Tokunaga (2005), the 12 Girls Band (2005), Acid Black Cherry (2007), Yōko Oginome and Junichi Inagaki (2010), Ayako Fuji (2011), Jun Shibata (2012), Ego-Wrappin' (2013), Misaki Iwasa (2014), Kazuya Yoshii (2015), Penicillin (2015), Tomoyo Harada (2016), Keisuke Kuwata (2019), Hiroji Miyamoto (2020), Mone Kamishiraishi (2020), Sora Amamiya (2021), May J. (2022), Juju (2023), and Yūko Miyamura (2023).

A cover version by Aina the End is part of the soundtrack of Kyrie (2023). A cover version is performed in 2024 film adaptation of Karaoke Iko! A cover version was performed on Mr. Trot Japan (2025).

A cover version in Cantonese was released under the title "Hang Zhong Bu Yao Wen" (Cantonese: 行踪不要問 or 行蹤不要問 or 行踪不要问) by Paula Tsui in 1980. A cover version in Mandarin was released under the title "Yìxiāngrén" (Mandarin: 異郷人) by Ai Jing in 1998.

== See also ==
- Saki Kubota discography
- List of Oricon number-one singles of 1979
- List of Oricon number-one singles of 1980
