= Saki Kubota discography =

The discography of Sayuri Kume, also known as Saki Kubota, includes eleven studio albums and ten singles released from 1979 to 2017.

== Overview ==
Her singles are as follows:

- Ihojin (1979)
- Nijūgoji (1980)
- Kugatsu No Iro (1980)
- Orange Airmail Special (1981)
- Lens Eye (1981)
- Negai (1982)
- Ai No Jidai (1983)
- Otomodachi (1984)
- Pianissimo De... (1984)
- Hyakuman Hon No Bara (1988)

Her studio albums are as follows:

- Yumegatari (1979)
- Tenkai (1980)
- Saudade (1980)
- Airmail Special (1981)
- Mishiranu Hito Denaku (1982)
- Nefertiti (1983)
- Yoruno Sokowa Yawarakana Maboroshi (1984)
- Tehillim 33 (1987)
- Hajime no hi (1996)
- Tenshi No Pan Kume Sayuri Sanbika Shu (2009)
- 7carats+1 (2017)

== Yumegatari ==
Yumegatari

Studio album by Saki Kubota
- Released: 21 December 1979
- Label: CBS/Sony

Saki Kubota chronology
Yumegatari (1979)	Tenkai (1980)

The album Yumegatari (Japanese: 夢がたり) (English: "Dream Stories" or "telling what one has dreamed" or an "account of one's dream" or "A Tale of Dreams") (1979) was released on 21 December 1979. The album Yumegatari stayed at number 1 in the Oricon chart for seven consecutive weeks from 31 December 1979 to 11 February 1980.

This album sold more than four hundred thousand copies and reached number 1 in both the Oricon LP album chart and the Oricon cassette tape album chart. It spent 21 weeks in the Oricon LP chart and 27 weeks in the Oricon cassette tape chart. It was number 4 in the Oricon annual chart. It reached number 1 in the Cash Box of Japan LPs chart. It reached number 1 in the Music Labo albums chart. The song Ihojin was released as a single.

The album has been re-released a number of times.

The song "Guitar Hiki O Mimasenka" (Japanese: ギター弾きを見ませんか) was covered by Isako Washio in 1991 and Midori Karashima in 2017.

The tracks on the LP and cassette tape are as follows:

Side A

- Prologue...Yumegatari (Japanese: プロローグ・・・夢がたり)
- Asa (Japanese: 朝)
- Ihojin
- Kikyou (Japanese: 帰郷)
- Guitar Hikiwo Mimasenka (Japanese: ギター弾きを見ませんか)
- Salam (Japanese: サラーム)

Side B

- Byakuya (Japanese: 白夜)
- Yumehiko (Japanese: 夢飛行)
- Gensou Ryokou (Japanese: 幻想旅行)
- Narcissus [Narcis] (Japanese: ナルシス)
- Hoshizora No Shounen (Japanese: 星空の少年)

== Tenkai ==
Tenkai

Studio album by Saki Kubota
- Released: 21 June 1980
- Label: CBS/Sony

Saki Kubota chronology
Yumegatari (1979)	Tenkai (1980)	Saudade (1980)

The album Tenkai (Japanese: 天界) (English: "The Heavens") (1980) was released on 21 June 1980. This album reached number 11 in the Oricon albums chart and the Music Labo albums chart. It spent 12 weeks in the Oricon chart and sold more than forty thousand copies.

It was re-released on Blu-spec CD2 on 10 April 2013, as part of the reissue series Nihon no Meiban Fukkoku Shirīzu (Japanese: 日本の名盤復刻シリーズ).

The tracks on the LP and cassette tape are as follows:

Side A

- Shangri-La [Shangurira] (Japanese: シャングリラ). This song was praised by Sora Amamiya, who subsequently released a cover version.
- Tenkai (Japanese: 天界)
- Midori No Yakata (Japanese: 碧の館)
- Shinju Shotō (Japanese: 真珠諸島). This song has been included in compilations of disco music.
- Aquarian Age [Akuerian Eiji] (Japanese: アクエリアン･エイジ)

Side B

- Budouju No Musume (Japanese: 葡萄樹の娘)
- Nijūgoji
- Denen Kyousoukyoku (Japanese: 田園協奏曲)
- Misekakedake No Yasashisa
- Saishuu Page [Saishū pēji] (Japanese: 最終ページ)

=== Nijūgoji ===
"Nijūgoji"

Single by Saki Kubota
- Language: Japanese
- B-side: "Misekakedake No Yasashisa"
- Released: 21 April 1980
- Length: 3:53
- Label: CBS/Sony
- Composer: Saki Kubota
- Lyricists: Saki Kubota and Keisuke Yamakawa

Saki Kubota singles chronology
"Ihojin" (1979)	"Nijūgoji" (1980)	"Kugatsu No Iro" (1980)

Audio video
- "Nijūgoji" on YouTube

The single Nijūgoji (Japanese: 25時) (English: "25th Hour") (1980) reached number 19 in the Oricon Singles Chart and spent 11 weeks in that chart. It sold 77,000 copies. The song was composed by Saki Kubota. The lyrics were written by Saki Kubota and Keisuke Yamakawa. The song was arranged by Mitsuo Hagita. The duration of the song is 3 minutes and 53 seconds. The single was released on 21 April 1980. The song on the B side of the single is "Misekakedake No Yasashisa" (Japanese: みせかけだけの優しさ). The duration of that song is 3 minutes and 17 seconds.

== Saudade ==
Saudade

Studio album by Saki Kubota
- Released: 21 November 1980
- Label: CBS/Sony

Saki Kubota chronology
Tenkai (1980)	Saudade (1980)	Airmail Special (1981)

The album Saudade (Japanese: サウダーデ) (1980) was released on 21 November 1980. It includes music influenced by fado.

This album reached number 54 in the Oricon albums chart. The album spent 5 weeks in the chart and sold more than ten thousand copies. The song "Kugatsu No Iro" was released as a single.

The tracks on the album are as follows:

Side A

- Ihojin
- Alfama No Musume [Arufama No Musume] (Japanese: アルファマの娘)
- Tomato Uri No Uta (Japanese: トマト売りの歌)
- 18の祭り
- Shigatsu Nijūgo Nichi Hashi (Japanese: 4月25日橋). The name of this song refers to the 25 de Abril Bridge.

Side B

- Saudade (Japanese: サウダーデ)
- Kugatsu No Iro
- Doukei (Japanese: 憧憬)
- Mayonaka No Sanpo
- Beginning [Biginingu] (Japanese: ビギニング)

=== Kugatsu No Iro ===
The single Kugatsu No Iro (Japanese: 九月の色) (1980) reached number 51 in the Oricon Singles Chart, and sold 23,000 copies. The single was released on 1 September 1980. The duration of the song "Kugatsu No Iro" is 3 minutes and 47 seconds. The song "Mayonaka No Sanpo" (Japanese: 真夜中の散歩) is on the B side of the single.

== Airmail Special ==
Airmail Special

Studio album by Saki Kubota
- Released: 21 May 1981
- Label: CBS/Sony

Saki Kubota chronology
Saudade (1980)	Airmail Special (1981)	Mishiranu Hito Denaku (1982)

The album Airmail Special (Japanese: エアメール・スペシャル) (1981) was released on 21 May 1981. This album reached number 33 in the Oricon LPs chart.

The tracks on the album are as follows:

Side A

- Prologue [Purorōgu] (Japanese: プロローグ)
- Orange Airmail Special
- Campus Gai '81 (Japanese: キャンパス街'81). This song has, in the 21st century, been described as city pop and included in compilations of city pop.
- Nihon No Kodomatachi
- 1999

Side B

- Amusement Zone [Amyūzumento zōn] (Japanese: アミューズメント・ゾーン)
- Shang-hai Nostalgie (Japanese: 上海ノスタルジー)
- Ennui (Japanese: アンニュイ). This song has, in the 21st century, been included in compilations of city pop.
- Panorama (Japanese: パノラマ)
- Nagai Yoru

The "Airmail Special" CD in Saki Kubota Premium box set includes the song "Lens Eye" as a bonus track.

=== Orange Airmail Special ===
The single Orange Airmail Special (Japanese: オレンジ・エアメール・スペシャル) (1981) reached number 62 in the Oricon Singles Chart, and sold 29,000 copies. It has been said that the single sold fairly well. The single was released on 21 April 1981. The song "Orange Airmail Special" was used in a television commercial for the orange drink called Kirin Orange (Japanese: キリンオレンジ). The song has been described as West Coast sound. The instruments used include the electric guitar. The song was composed by Saki Kubota. The lyrics were written by Keisuke Yamakawa. The song was arranged by Mitsuo Hagita. The duration of the song is 3 minutes and 45 seconds. The song "Nagai Yoru" (Japanese: 長い夜) is on the B side of the single.

=== Lens Eye ===
The duration of the song Lens Eye (Japanese: レンズ・アイ) is 3 minutes and 17 seconds. The song "Nihon No Kodomatachi" (Japanese: 日本の子供達) was the B side of the single "Lens Eye". The single was released on 26 August 1981. The song "Lens Eye" was not included in the album "Airmail Special". The song "Lens Eye" was praised by CDJournal.

== Mishiranu Hito Denaku ==
The album Mishiranu Hito Denaku (Japanese: 見知らぬ人でなく) (1982) was released on 21 July 1982. The song "Negai" was released as a single.

The tracks on the album are as follows:

Side A

- The City (Japanese: ザ・シティー)
- Mishiranu Hito Denaku (Japanese: 見知らぬ人でなく)
- Rasen Kaidan (Japanese: らせん階段)
- 夏の夜の10時30分
- Just A Friend [Jasuto a furendo] (Japanese: ジャスト・ア・フレンド)

Side B

- Kigi Ga Ooki Katta Koro Ni (Japanese: 木々が大きかった頃に)
- Negai (Japanese: ねがい)
- Lonely People [Ronrī pīpuru] (Japanese: ロンリー・ピープル)
- Stage Door [Sutēji doa] (Japanese: ステージ・ドア)
- Shaso (Japanese: 車窓)

=== Negai ===
The single Negai (Japanese: ねがい) was released in 1982.

== Nefertiti ==
The album Nefertiti (Japanese: ネフェルティティ) (1983) was released 21 April 1983. The name of this album, and of its title track, refer to Nefertiti. The song "Ai No Jidai" was released as a single.

The songs on the LP and cassette tape were arranged by Kei Wakakusa. The tracks on the LP and cassette tape are as follows:

Side A

- Nefertiti (Japanese: ネフェルティティ)
- Gypsy (Japanese: ジプシー)
- Sophia Hatsu (Japanese: ソフィア発)
- Suna No Shiro (Japanese: 砂の城)

Side B

- Jawa No Higashi (Japanese: ジャワの東)
- Hada Zamui Gogo No Hi (Japanese: 肌寒い午後の日)
- Ai No Jidai (Japanese: 愛の時代)
- Fuyu No Mizuumi (Japanese: 冬の湖)
- Saishuubin (Japanese: 最終便)

=== Ai No Jidai ===
The single Ai No Jidai (Japanese: 愛の時代) (English: "The Age of Love" or "The Epoch of Love") (1983) was released on 1 February 1983. The song on the B side of this single is "Lucian" (Japanese: ルシアン).

There is a cover version of "Lucian" by Yuko Kimoto (1983).

== Yoruno Sokowa Yawarakana Maboroshi ==
Yoruno Sokowa Yawarakana Maboroshi

Studio album by Saki Kubota
- Released: 1 October 1984
- Label: CBS/Sony

Saki Kubota chronology
Nefertiti (1983)	Yoruno Sokowa Yawarakana Maboroshi (1984)	Tehillim 33 (1987)

The album Yoruno Sokowa Yawarakana Maboroshi (Japanese: 夜の底は柔らかな幻) (1984) was released on 1 October 1984. This album has been described as her greatest masterpiece. The 2013 novel of the same name, by Riku Onda, is named after this album.

The songs on the LP and cassette tape were arranged by Daisaku Kume. The tracks on the LP and cassette tape are as follows:

Side A: Fortessimo Dream

- Melancholy No Tablecloth [Merankorī no tēburukurosu] (Japanese: メランコリーのテーブルクロス)
- Tsuki No Hamabe Button Ga Hitotsu (Japanese: 月の浜辺ボタンがひとつ)
- Nejireta Venus (Japanese: ねじれたヴィーナス)
- Kugatsu No Restaurant (Japanese: 9月のレストラン)
- Samui Ehagaki (Japanese: 寒い絵葉書)

Side B: Pianissimo Dream

- Yoru No Soko Wa Yawaraka Na Maboroshi
- Pianissimo De
- Phoenicia (Japanese: フェニキア)
- Mienai Te (Japanese: 見えない手)

=== Pianissimo De ===
The single Pianissimo De (Japanese: ピアニッシモで...) (1984) was released 1 October 1984. The song on the B side of the single is "Yoru No Soko Wa Yawaraka Na Maboroshi" (Japanese: 夜の底は柔らかな幻).

== Otomodachi ==
The single Otomodachi (Japanese: お友達) (English: "Friend") (1984) was released 23 March 1984. The song is included in the compilation album Saki Kubota Best Selection (1984).

== Tehillim 33 ==
The album Tehillim 33 (Japanese: テヒリーム33) (1987) was released in 1987 and reprinted in 2004.

Tehillim 33 was Sayuri Kume's first solo album of Christian music. She had previously participated in the album Utau Tabibito (Japanese: 歌う旅人) (1985). "Tehillim" means psalm.

The tracks on the Tehillim 33 album include the following hymns, in Japanese: "Syu Wo Homeyo Waga Kokoro" (主をほめよわが心), "Chiisaki Hoshi Wa" (小さき星は), "Wunderbarer Konig" (くすしき神-讃美歌73番-), "Euroclydon" (風激しく-讃美歌126番-), "Lancashire" (地よ声高く-讃美歌154番-), "Just As I Am, Without One Plea" (いさおなき我を-讃美歌271番-), the "Crusader's Hymn" (イエス君はいとうるわし-讃美歌166番-), "The Church's One Foundation" (いとも尊き-讃美歌191番-), "St. Chrysostom" (主よ、主の愛をば-讃美歌342番-), Little Stars Are Shining (Epilogue) (小さき星は（エピローグ）-讃美歌455番-), "Beautiful Lillies, White As the Snow" by Alice Jean Cleator (うるわしの白百合-讃美歌496番-) and "I Love to Tell the Story" (いともかしこし-讃美歌502番-).

The tracks include recordings of hymns that are included the 1954 Edition.

== Hajime no hi ==
The album Hajime no hi (Japanese: はじめの日) (1996) (English: "First Day") was released on 25 February 1996, and reissued on 22 November 2000.

== Tenshi No Pan Kume Sayuri Sanbika Shu ==
The album Tenshi No Pan Kume Sayuri Sanbika Shu (Japanese: 天使のパン くめさゆり・さんびか集) (2009) was released on 24 June 2009.

== Saki Kubota Best of Best ==
The album Saki Kubota Best of Best (Japanese: Saki Kubota Best of Best: 久保田早紀 ベスト・オブ・ベスト (Kubota Saki Besuto obu Besuto)) was released on 21 November 1992. The pictures on the jacket are from 1979.

== Golden J-Pop/The Best Saki Kubota ==
The album Golden J-Pop/The Best Saki Kubota (Japanese: GOLDEN J-POP/THE BEST 久保田早紀) was released on 21 November 1997. It is part of the "Golden J-Pop/The Best" series.

== Dream Price 1000 Saki Kubota Ihojin ==
The album Dream Price 1000 Saki Kubota Ihojin (Japanese: DREAM PRICE 1000 久保田早紀 異邦人) was released on 11 October 2001. It is part of the "Dream Price" series.

== Golden Best Saki Kubota ==
The album Golden Best Saki Kubota (Japanese: GOLDEN☆BEST 久保田早紀) was released on 20 November 2002. The album includes material not previously released on CD. The album Golden Best Saki Kubota includes karaoke versions of both the Yumegatari version, and the (Portuguese recording) Saudade version, of the song "Ihojin".

== 999 Best Saki Kubota ==
The album 999 Best Saki Kubota (Japanese: 999 Best 久保田早紀) was released on 18 October 2006.

== Saki Kubota Premium ==
The box set Saki Kubota Premium was released in January 2020, to celebrate the 40th anniversary of her debut in 1979. Its contents consists of nine CDs, a blu-ray DVD and an 80 page booklet. The box set includes the theme song of the radio programme Do You Love Me (Japanese: ドウ・ユ・ラブ・ミー) in Futari no Heya (Japanese: ふたりの部屋), which was broadcast on NHK-FM in 1984. That song is released for the first time on home media.

== The Essential Saki Kubota ==
The album The Essential Saki Kubota (Japanese: 久保田早紀 エッセンシャル) was released on 4 June 2025. It is an analog record, on translucent red vinyl. It is a 12-inch 33 1/3rpm LP. It reached number 18 on the Oricon daily album chart. It reached number 74 on the Billboard Japan weekly "Top Albums Sales" physical sales chart.
