= Suspense (album) =

Suspense ~Pink Lady Again~

Studio album by Pink Lady
- Released: June 21, 1984
- Recorded: 1984
- Genres: J-pop; city pop
- Language: Japanese
- Label: VAP
- Producers: Masami Yoshida; Toshio Oguri

Pink Lady chronology
Sayonara Pink Lady (1981)	Suspense ~Pink Lady Again~ (1984)	Blood New (1987)

Singles from Suspense
- 1. "Fushigi Love" Released: June 21, 1984

Suspense ~Pink Lady Again~ (サスペンス・ピンク・レディー・アゲイン, Sasupensu Pinku Redī Agein) is the sixth studio album by Japanese idol duo Pink Lady, released through VAP on June 21, 1984. It was the duo's reunion album after having disbanded in 1981. Following the concert tour to promote the album, Mie and Keiko Masuda once again went their separate ways to focus on their solo careers until their second reformation in 1989.

== Track listing ==
All music is arranged by Makoto Matsushita.

All lyrics are written by Masao Urino.

Side A
No.	Title	Lyrics	Music	Length
1.	"Konya wa Lonely" (Kon'ya wa Rōnrī (今夜はLONELY; "Lonely Tonight"))	Hiromi Mori	Kisaburō Suzuki	3:13
2.	"Fushigi Love" (Fushigi Rabu (不思議LOVE; "Magical Love"))	Takashi Tsushimi	Tsushimi	4:25
3.	"Africa ni Ikitai" (Afurika ni Ikitai (アフリカに行きたい; "I Want to Go to Africa"))	Yūho Iwasato	Mio Iwasato	3:32
4.	"Tsumi na Natsu" ((罪な夏; "Sinful Summer"))	Yukinojo Mori	Toshiyuki Kimori	3:41
5.	"With"		Ryō Matsuda	5:12

Side B
No.	Title	Lyrics	Music	Length
1.	"Darling"	Fumi Fukunaga	Masaki Ueda	3:41
2.	"Glass Elevator" (Garasu no Erebētā (ガラスのエレベーター))	Urino	Matsuda	3:14
3.	"Tasogarete Modern Girl" (Tasogarete Modan Gāru (黄昏てモダン・ガール; "Modern Girl of the Dusk"))	Y. Mori	Matsushita	3:37
4.	""Suspensory Ai Shite"" (Sasupensōrī Ai Shite (SUSPENSORY愛して; "Suspensory Love"))	H. Mori	Tatsushi Umegaki	3:39
5.	"Kanashimi no Silhouette" (Kanashimi no Shiruetto (悲しみのシルエット; "Silhouette of Sadness"))	Ikki Matsumoto	Suzuki	3:53

== Personnel ==
- MIE and Keiko Masuda - vocals
- Michiko Ogata - backing vocals
- Toshio Oguri - backing vocals
- Makoto Matsushita - guitar, keyboards, backing vocals
- Masato Matsuda - keyboards
- Yasuo Tomikura - bass
- Naoki Watanabe - bass ("Konya wa Lonely")
- Masahiro Miyazaki - drums
- Toshihiro Nakanishi - conductor
- Maeda Strings - string orchestra
- Eiji Arai Group - horns
- Susumu Kazuhara Group - horns

== See also ==
- 1984 in Japanese music
