= Chiharu Matsuyama =

Japanese folk singer and songwriter (born 1955)

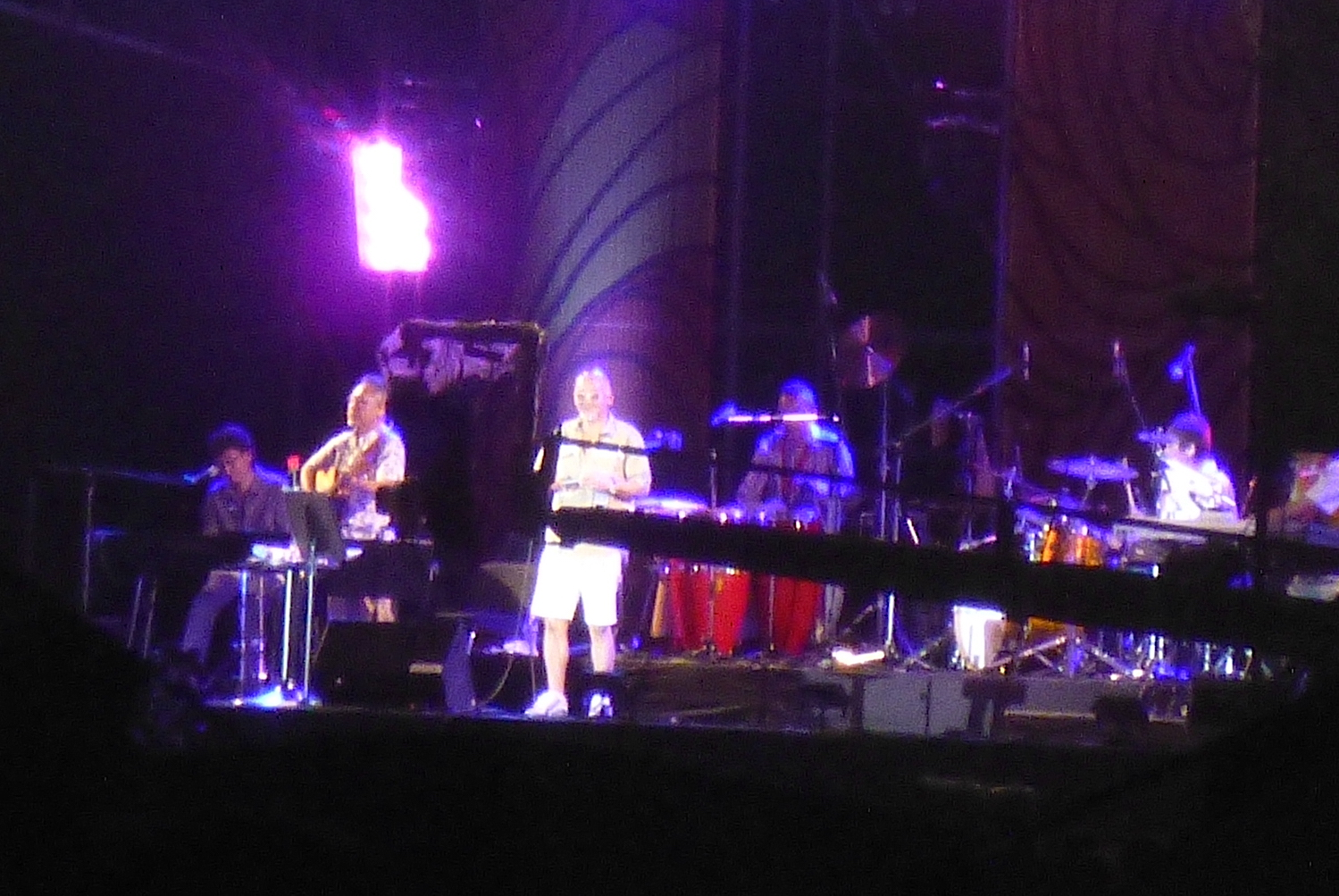
- Live on stage (the man in shorts), 2016

Background information
- Born: 松山千春; December 16, 1955 (age 70); Ashoro, Hokkaido, Japan
- Genres: Japanese folk music
- Years active: 1977–present
- Label: Nippon Columbia Co., Ltd.
- Website: Official Website

Chiharu Matsuyama (松山千春, born December 16, 1955) is a Japanese folk singer and songwriter.

He made his debut with the single Tabidachi in 1977, and success soon followed with the two hits Toki no Itazura and Kisetsu no Nakade.

Matsuyama has been portrayed in film by Shunsuke Daitō. Daitō played him in a 2008 film based on Matsuyama's autobiographical work Ashoro Yori, published in 1979.
