= Blu-spec =

Read-only optical disc for high-fidelity audio storage

- Media type: Optical disc
- Developed by: Sony
- Usage: Audio storage
- Extended from: Compact Disc Digital Audio
- Released: 2008; 18 years ago

Blu-spec is a rarely-used format of compact disc made using production techniques similar to Blu-ray discs, but are readable with standard compact disc players. The alleged benefit of these is in the playback accuracy. The back catalogue of mainstream artists was released in this format.

== Background ==
In November 2009, Japanese company Sony Music Entertainment announced that it had developed a new CD that was compatible with standard compact disc players. It was claimed by Sony Music Entertainment that in the production process, new machines were used to make the master discs.

When a standard CD is mastered, an Infared beam is used to make the digital notches on the master disc (mother matrix). With the Blu-spec master, a blue laser is used, which is a finer etching process. With this technology, the notches are therefore more precise, which reduces playback errors. The notches on a Blu-spec CD have a width of 125 nm compared to the 500 nm width on a standard CD.

The difference between a Blu-spec CD and a Super Audio CD is that the Super Audio CD has the capability of storing much higher quality audio. The Blu-spec CD uses the standard 16-bit, 44 kHz audio encoding, stores no extra information on the disc, and is not capable of providing an improvement in sound.

== History ==
When the format was launched in 2008, the manufacturer, Sony, didn't make any claims about a superior sound to standard CDs. Neither did they make any comparisons between this new format and the Super Audio CD (SACD). The benefit of these new discs is said to be the accuracy in reading the data on the discs.

According to Tech Crunch, Sony had plans to release around sixty titles in Japan, to be available on December 24, 2008, including Kind of Blue by Miles Davis and an album by Aerosmith. Other releases were in various genres including jazz and classical.

The Blu-spec and HQCD formats were reviewed by Wojciech Pacula of the polish High Fidelity magazine in May 2009. The conclusion after the review tests were done was that there was marked difference between standard CDs vs HQCD and Blu-spec CD pressings. Pacula claimed that there was an audible difference. However, even though he said that Blu-spec was "really something", it was HQCD that had the better sound.

According to the "JAPAN: Like CDs, only better..." article by Andrew Everard for What Hi-Fi in July 2009, the format has an extensive Bob Dylan catalogue, as well as all of Billy Joel's catalogue and releases of Deep Purple, Michael Jackson, Elvis Presley, Lou Reed, Simon & Garfunkel and Patti Smith.

In 2013, Sony released an album, Feel the Difference of the Blu-spec CD2 (cat# Sony Records Int'l SICP 30125–6), a 2CD 34 track compilation containing tracks by Elvis Presley, Bob Dylan, Santana and Earth, Wind & Fire.

== Releases (selective) ==
In July, 2009, Barbra Streisand's Essential Barbra Streisand was released on the format as a 2-CD album on Sony No SICP-20190/1.

Jimi Hendrix's Electric Ladyland was released on Blu-spec CD2 in 2015 on Sony Records Int'l SICP 30823.

In 2018 Wasabi Records released the Foundations' Digging the Foundations album (cat# WSBAC-0102) in Blu-spec format. The CD came with eight bonus tracks and liner notes by Masato Wakatsuki (若月眞人). Two other albums, From the Foundations and Rocking the Foundations were also released on the label. In late 2018, the 40 Trips Around the Sun album by Toto was released on Blu-spec 2 format on Sony Records Int'l SICP 31137.

The new Deep Purple album, =1 also was released on Blu-Spec CD exclusively in Japan on August 7 2024 by King Records.
