= Mayumi Itsuwa =

Japanese singer

- Origin: Nakano, Tokyo, Japan
- Genres: Japanese pop, folk, kayōkyoku, pop
- Occupations: Singer, composer, lyricist, keyboardist
- Instruments: Vocals, piano
- Website: itsuwamayumi.com

Mayumi Itsuwa (五輪 真弓, Itsuwa Mayumi) is a Japanese vocalist, composer, lyricist, and keyboardist who made her debut in 1972.

Her first studio album entitled Shoujo was recorded in Los Angeles, produced by Grammy Award winner John Fischbach, with distinguished musicians such as David Campbell, Carole King and Charles Larkey who was King's husband at that time. Owing to her introspective compositions, Itsuwa was often nicknamed "Japanese Carole King", along with other Japanese singer-songwriters like Yumi Matsutoya (who had worked under her birth name "Yumi Arai" during the mid-1970s) and Minako Yoshida.

Itsuwa gained moderate success on the Japanese albums chart in her early career, and received massive popularity and acclaim through the single "Koibito yo" released in 1980. The song topped Japan's Oricon chart for three consecutive weeks, and won the 22nd Japan Record Award for "Gold Prize" in the same year. It was covered by the country's legendary singers including Hibari Misora and Noriko Awaya in later years, and became a signature song for Itsuwa. In 1981 her song "Revival" also became a very well recognized hit.

After "Koibito yo" became a hit, Itsuwa gained popularity also in non-Japanese Asian countries during the 1980s.

In Indonesia, "Kokoro No Tomo", "Amayadori" and "Rebaibaru" become the most popular songs ever released by her. In 2006, Mayumi Itsuwa and Delon Thamrin recorded an Indonesian and Japanese version of the song. This was later included on the 2006 compilation album "Duet Love Songs". Many of her songs would fall into the musical genre of torch songs because they often describe the lingering memory of past loves.

== Discography ==
=== Albums ===
==== Studio albums ====
Title	Album details	Peak chart positions
Title	Album details	JP
Shoujo (少女)	Released: 1972; Label: CBS Sony; Formats: LP, CD, Cassette tape, digital download, streaming	6
Kaze no Nai Sekai (風のない世界)	Released: 1973; Label: CBS Sony; Formats: LP, CD, CT, digital download, streaming	14
Toki wo Mitsumete (時をみつめて)	Released: 1974; Label: CBS Sony; Formats: LP, CD, CT, digital download, streaming	25
Mayumity (Utsuro na Ai) (MAYUMITY・うつろな愛)	Released: 1975; Label: CBS Sony; Formats: LP, CD, CT, digital download, streaming	37
Etranger (えとらんぜ, Etoranze)	Released: 1977; Label: CBS Sony; Formats: LP, CD, CT, digital download, streaming	34
Aozora (蒼空)	Released: 1977; Label: CBS Sony; Formats: LP, CD, CT, digital download, streaming	50
Nokoribi (残り火)	Released: 1978; Label: CBS Sony; Formats: LP, CD, CT, digital download, streaming	17
Kiro (岐路)	Released: 1979; Label: CBS Sony; Formats: LP, CD, CT, digital download, streaming	17
Koibito yo (恋人よ)	Released: 1980; Label: CBS Sony; Formats: LP, CD, CT, digital download, streaming	1
Marionette (マリオネット)	Released: 1981; Label: CBS Sony; Formats: LP, CD, CT, digital download, streaming	5
Shiosai (潮騒)	Released: 1982; Label: CBS Sony; Formats: LP, CD, CT, digital download, streaming	6
Mado (窓)	Released: 1983; Label: CBS Sony; Formats: LP, CD, CT, digital download, streaming	15
'Kaze no Uta (風の詩)	Released: 1985; Label: CBS Sony; Formats: LP, CD, CT, digital download, streaming	31
Toki no Nagare ni (時の流れに)	Released: 1986; Label: CBS Sony; Formats: LP, CD, CT, digital download, streaming	12
Wind and Roses	Released: 1987; Label: CBS Sony; Formats: LP, CD, CT, digital download, streaming	31
Nostalgie (ノスタルジー)	Released: 1988; Label: CBS Sony; Formats: LP, CD, CT, digital download, streaming	29
Na mo Naki Michi (名もなき道)	Released: 1990; Label: CBS Sony; Formats: CD, CT, digital download, streaming	47
The Memorial Album	Released: 1992; Label: Sony; Formats: CD, CT, digital download, streaming	70
Personal	Released: 1994; Label: Sony; Formats: CD, digital download, streaming	-
21st Century (21世紀)	Released: 1996; Label: Sony; Formats: CD, digital download, streaming	-
Time to Sing	Released: 2003; Label: Sony; Formats: CD, digital download, streaming	-
Welcome	Released: 2007; Label: Sony Music Direct; Formats: SACD, digital download, streaming	6

==== Live albums ====
Title	Album details	Peak chart positions
Title	Album details	JP
Fuyuzareta Machi (冬ざれた街)	Released: 1974; Label: CBS Sony; Formats: LP, CD, digital download, streaming	9
Hontou no Koto wo Ieba (本当のことをいえば)	Released: 1975; Label: CBS Sony; Formats: LP, CD, digital download, streaming	9
The SHOW - best concert album '75	Released: 1975; Label: CBS Sony; Formats: LP, CD, digital download, streaming	-
Shunshu (春愁)	Released: 1981; Label: CBS Sony; Formats: LP, CD, digital download, streaming	9
Live '83	Released: 1983; Label: CBS Sony; Formats: LP, CD, digital download, streaming	32
Atsui Sayonara (熱いさよなら)	Released: 1984; Label: CBS Sony; Formats: LP, CD, digital download, streaming	15
Mayumi Itsuwa Live: Kokoro no Tomo AFTER DECADES (五輪真弓ライブ～心の友～AFTER DECADES)	Released: 1984; Label: Sony Music Direct; Formats: CD, digital download, streaming	-

==== Compilation albums ====
Title	Album details	Peak chart positions
Title	Album details	JP
Collection	Released: 1981; Label: CBS Sony; Formats: Cassette tape	17
Collection '82	Released: 1981; Label: CBS Sony; Formats: Cassette tape, LP	64
Best	Released: 1985; Label: CBS Sony; Formats: Cassette tape	33
Best Collection	Released: 1986; Label: CBS Sony; Formats: CD	64
Best Selection	Released: 1986; Label: CBS Sony; Formats: Cassette tape	36
Singles	Released: 1987; Label: CBS Sony; Formats: CD	67
New Best Collection	Released: 1989; Label: CBS Sony; Formats: CD	64
Anniversary Eve	Released: 1991; Label: Sony Records; Formats: CD	82
Anthology Vol. 1/2	Released: 1993; Label: Sony Records; Formats: CD	-
Now And Forever	Released: 1996; Label: Sony Records; Formats: CD	-
Mayumi Classics	Released: 2002; Label: Sony Records; Formats: CD	-
Blue Anthology	Released: 2003; Label: Sony Records; Formats: CD	-
Mayumi the Best: Kokoro no Tomo	Released: 2006; Label: Sony Records; Formats: CD	-
Golden Best Deluxe Mayumi Itsuwa Complete Single Collection (GOLDEN☆BEST deluxe 五輪真弓 コンプリート・シングルコレクション)	Released: 2009; Label: Sony Music Direct; Formats: CD	-
Mayumi Itsuwa 40th Anniversary Best Album "Lovers and Friends" (五輪真弓40周年記念ベストアルバム「Lovers & Friends」)	Released: 2013; Label: Sony Music Direct; Formats: CD	5
Mayumi Itsuwa Best Encore (五輪真弓BEST ENCORE)	Released: 2015; Label: Sony Music Direct; Formats: CD	-

=== Singles ===
Year	Album	Chart positions (JP)	Label
1972	Shoujo (少女)	-	CBS Sony
1973	Ame (雨)	-	CBS Sony
1973	Kinou Made no Omoide (昨日までの想い出)	-	CBS Sony
1973	Tabako no Kemuri (煙草のけむり)	-	CBS Sony
1974	Fuyuzareta machi (冬ざれた街)	-	CBS Sony
1974	Mister Grundy Sky (ミスター・クラウディ・スカイ)	-	CBS Sony
1974	Sakeyokusa (酒酔草)	-	CBS Sony
1975	Rakujitsu no Theme (落日のテーマ)	-	CBS Sony
1975	Utsuro na Ai (うつろな愛)	-	CBS Sony
1976	Jungle Gym (ジャングルジム)	-	CBS Sony
1977	Umi (海)	-	CBS Sony
1977	Game (ゲーム)	-	CBS Sony
1978	Sayonara dake wa Iwanaide (さよならだけは言わないで)	13	CBS Sony
1978	Nokoribi (残り火)	-	CBS Sony
1979	Yoru Ressha (夜汽車)	-	CBS Sony
1979	Aikagi (合鍵)	-	CBS Sony
1980	Yakusoku (約束)	-	CBS Sony
1980	Koibito yo (恋人よ)	1	CBS Sony
1981	Unmei (運命)	-	CBS Sony
1981	Revival (リバイバル)	21	CBS Sony
1982	Jigsaw Puzzle (ジグソーパズル)	-	CBS Sony
1982	Towazu Tabako (問わず煙草)	-	CBS Sony
1982	Dakishimete (抱きしめて)	-	CBS Sony
1983	Mayonaka no Love Song (真夜中のラブソング)	-	CBS Sony
1983	Dokei (時計)	-	CBS Sony
1983	Yasei no Namida (野性の涙)	-	CBS Sony
1984	Tanin Gaeru (他人がえり)	-	CBS Sony
1984	Atsui Sayonara (熱いさよなら)		CBS Sony
1985	Mikkai (密会)	-	CBS Sony
1986	Sora (空グ)	-	CBS Sony
1986	Toki no Nagare ni: Tori ni nare (時の流れに〜鳥になれ〜)	84	CBS Sony
1986	Nakanaide (泣かないで)	-	CBS Sony
1987	Soshite Sayonara (そしてさよなら)	-	CBS Sony
1988	Hello My Friend (ハロー、マイ・フレンド)	-	CBS Sony
1990	Omae (おまえン)	-	CBS Sony
1992	Sayonara wa Ichido dake (さよならは一度だけ)	-	Sony
1992	Itsumo Soshite Itsumademo (いつも そして いつまでも)	-	Sony
1994	Kanashimi ni Makasete (悲しみにまかせて)	-	Sony
1996	Utakata (うたかた)	-	Sony
1996	-		Sony
1997	Toki wa Sugite (時は過ぎて)	-	Sony
2000	Ai no Yakusoku/Kokoro no Uta (愛の約束/心の歌)	-	Sony
2004	Fureau Toki wo Shinjite (ふれあう時を信じて)	-	Sony
2013	Born Again	-	Sony Music Direct

==== Collaboration singles ====
Year	Album	Chart positions (JP)	Label
2005	Kokoro Tomo: with Delon Thamrin	-	Sony Music

== Songwriting credits ==
List of songs written and composed for other artists, showing year released and album name
Year	Title	Artist(s)	Album/Single
1980	Suna no Shiro (砂の城)	Nana Kinomi	Suna no Shiro
1982	Ai no Saffron (愛のサフラン), Hagure Ai (はぐれ愛)	Mirei Kihara	Ai no Saffron
1982	Ame no Hi ni Wakare (雨の日の別離)	Noriko Awaya	Ame no Hi ni Wakare
1983	Marianne' (マリアンヌ)	Jackie Chan	Marianne
1983	Tsumiki Kusuji (積木くずし)	Chiyoko Shimakura	Tsumiki Kusuji
1983	Omoide Sagashi (石原裕次郎)	Yūjirō Ishihara	Omoide Sagashi
1986	Haru Gokoro (春ごころ), Nippaime kara no Hajimari (二杯目からのはじまり)	Yoshie Kashiwabara	Haru Gokoro

== Videography ==
=== Live albums ===
Title	Album details	Peak chart positions
Title	Album details	JP
Itsuwa Mayumi'83 (五輪真弓'83)	Released: 1983; Label: CBS Sony; Formats: VHS, LD	-
Itsuwa Mayumi Live: Toki no Nagare ni (五輪真弓 ライブ・時の流れに)	Released: 1987; Label: CBS Sony; Formats: LD	-
Wind And Roses	Released: 1987; Label: CBS Sony; Formats: CDV	-
Master Piece	Released: 1988; Label: CBS Sony; Formats: VHS	-
Itsuwa Mayumi 20 Shuunen Collection Concert Tour '92-'93 (五輪真弓20周年コレクション コンサートツアー '92〜'93)	Released: 1993; Label: Sony; Formats: VHS	-
