= Saki Kubota =

Japanese singer-songwriter (born 1958)

Sayuri Kume
- Born: Sayuri Kubota (久保田 小百合, Kubota Sayuri); 11 May 1958 (age 68); Kunitachi, Tokyo
- Genres: New music Christian music
- Occupation: Singer-songwriter
- Labels: CBS/Sony; Michtam Records; Funhouse; MMP; MIDI inc

Sayuri Kume (Japanese: 久米小百合 (Kume Sayuri)), also known as Saki Kubota (Japanese: 久保田早紀 (Kubota Saki)), is a Japanese singer-songwriter whose song Ihojin (1979) (Japanese: 異邦人) sold more than 1.4 million copies and reached number 1 in the Japanese singles chart. The song was used in the "Silk Road" television commercial for Sanyo.

Her album Yumegatari (Japanese: 夢がたり) stayed at number 1 in the Oricon chart for seven consecutive weeks from 31 December 1979 to 11 February 1980. Her album Tenkai (Japanese: 天界) reached number 11 in the Japanese chart in 1980. Her album Saudade (Japanese: サウダーデ) reached number 54 in the Japanese chart. Her album Yoruno Sokowa Yawarakana Maboroshi (1984) has been described as her greatest masterpiece.

Her single Nijūgoji (1980) (Japanese: 25時) reached number 19 in the Japanese chart. Her single Kugatsu No Iro (Japanese: 九月の色) (1980) reached number 51 in the Japanese chart. Her single Orange Airmail Special (Japanese: オレンジ・エアメール・スペシャル) (1981) reached number 62 in the Japanese chart.

She appeared on The Best Ten, Yoru no Hit Studio, and Music Fair.

She sang songs in the new music genre (Japanese: ニューミュージック, nyū myūjikku). She has been described as the standard bearer of that genre.

She was awarded the female newcomer award (Japanese: 女性新人賞) at the 13th Japan Record Sales Awards (Japanese: 日本レコードセールス大賞) in 1980.

In January 2020, a box set was released under the title Saki Kubota Premium to celebrate the 40th anniversary of her debut in 1979.

== Life ==
She was born on 11 May 1958 in Kunitachi, Tokyo, and moved to Hachioji at the age of thirteen.

She attended a sunday school where hymns were sung. She was aware of the music of Akai Tori, Akiko Yano, The Beatles Shigeru Izumiya, The Spiders, Takuro Yoshida, The Tempters and Yuming, and listened to music by Garo and The Tigers.

She began to write lyrics and compose music when she was in senior high school (kōtōgakkō, abbreviated to kōkō).

She plays the piano.

She was educated at the Second Kyoritsu Girl's Senior High School (Kyōritsu joshi dai ni kōkō). She graduated from the Department of Literature at Kyoritsu Women's Junior College, and the Department of Theology at the Tokyo Baptist Theological Seminary of the Japan Baptist Convention.

She was the 6th best selling composer of 1980, with 1.5 million sales. She was the 7th best selling lyricist of 1980, with 1.46 million sales. She was one of only two people included in both the top ten bestselling composers, and the top ten bestselling lyricists, of that year.

She was baptised in 1981. In 1985, she married Daisaku Kume (Japanese: 久米大作), son of Akira Kume.

Since her marriage, she has used her real married name, Sayuri Kume, for her Christian music, instead of using the stage name "Saki", which she used for her music from 1979 to 1984. She released four albums of Christian music from 1987 to 2017. In 2007, she became a goodwill ambassador for the Japan Bible Society. She began hosting a "Bible Cafe" study group in 2004. She has given talks about food in the Bible.

In 2004, Saki Kubota was number 65 in the mora annual download rankings for artists. In 2007, Shūkan Shōwa Taimuzu featured her on the back cover as person of the moment (Japanese: 時の人) for 1980. As of 2024, there is nostalgia for Saki Kubota as an artist in the new music genre in the 1980s. According to a survey by the Sankei Shimbun, when votes for folk, rock and pop songs were tallied by artist, she was found to be the 16th most popular artist of the Shōwa era in those genres.

She appeared at the Tōkyō Kirisuto kyōgaku-en school festival in 1989, and at a Christmas event in Yokohama in 2024.

After the Great East Japan Earthquake in 2011, she was a co-founder of "Tōhoku Ōendan Love East" (Japanese: 東北応援団LOVE EAST).

She influenced the music of Tomoyo Harada. Some 21st century music has been described as reminiscent of Saki Kubota's Shōwa era music.

There was a Saki Kubota newsletter called Misch Masch (Japanese: ミッシュマッシュ).

== Concerts ==
Her appearance at the Nakano Sun Plaza Hall was relayed by NHK-FM on 3 March 1980. This was a Hinamatsuri (ひな祭り) concert. She participated in a concert broadcast live on FM Tokyo on 27 April 1980.

Her farewell concert was on 26 November 1984. A video recording of the concert was released under the title Saki Kubota Farewell Concert (Japanese: 久保田早紀 フェアウェルコンサート) on VHS and Betamax in 1985, and on DVD in 2011. A live album was released on CD. The concert was held at Kudan Kaikan in Tokyo.

Her 40th anniversary concert was held in 2021, having been postponed. It was broadcast on Tokyo MX in 2022.

She participated in a gospel concert held at Yomiuri Land in 1992. She participated in a Christmas concert held at Himeji Shimin Kaikan (Japanese: 姫路市民会館) in Himeji on 10 December 2000. She participated in a charity concert in 2010. She participated in a Christmas concert in the Omi Gakudo hall (Japanese: 近江楽堂) on the third floor of the Tokyo Opera City Tower (Japanese: 東京オペラシティビル) in 2014. She did a charity concert at The Nippon Club in New York in 2015. She did a christmas concert at Blues Alley Japan (Japanese: ブルースアレイジャパン) in Meguro, Meguro-ku, Tokyo in 2017. In 2024, she sang at an event in Kitami, and did a concert in the Former Kunitachi Station. She did a charity concert in Shika, Ishikawa in 2025.

She has done concerts in Christian schools and churches.

== Television ==
In 1981, she appeared in Saki Kubota no Love is Art Shinanoji no Tabi (Japanese: 久保田早紀の Love is Art 信濃路の旅) on Channel 8. In 2013, she was one of the subjects of Utamonogatari (Japanese: うたものがたり) on NHK BS Premium. She appeared on NHK Tanka on 16 February 2014. She appeared on Non Stop! on 5 February 2019. She appeared on Takeda Tetsuya no Shōwa wa kagayaiteita on 16 August 2024. She appeared on The Time in September 2024. In 2025, she appeared in Kami No Chinmoku (Japanese: 神の沈黙).

== Radio ==
She was the presenter of Viva! Sukaiu~otchingu (Japanese: Viva! スカイウォッチング) on Radio Tampa. She starred in Do You Love Me (Japanese: ドウ・ユ・ラブ・ミー) in Futari no Heya (Japanese: ふたりの部屋) on NHK-FM in 1984. In 1980, she was the subject of special episodes of Ryuun Nagai Disc Jockey Program and Your Sunday on FM Tokyo, and she appeared on Saki Kubota Live Special on FM Osaka. In the 1980s, she was featured in radio programmes such as New Music Now, Music Salon, Fresh Time Box and Sound Companions on FM Osaka, New Music Republic on FM Tokyo, and Music Lounge on both FM Tokyo and FM Osaka. In 2025, she was the subject of a special episode of Kodawari Set List on Radio Nikkei. In the 2020s, her songs were also broadcast by radio stations such as TBS Radio, STV Radio, ABC Radio, Radio Nippon and Radio Osaka.

== Discography ==
She released eleven studio albums and ten singles from 1979 to 2017. She released seven studio albums, and nine singles, on the CBS/Sony record label from 1979 to 1984. She released another single on the Fun House record label in 1988.

=== Singles ===
The following singles were released by CBS/Sony:

- Ihojin: Shiruku Rōdo No Tēma (Japanese: 異邦人 -シルクロードのテーマ-) (1979)
- Nijūgoji (Japanese: 25時) (1980)
- Kugatsu No Iro (Japanese: 九月の色) (1980)
- Orange Airmail Special (Japanese: オレンジ・エアメール・スペシャル) (1981). This song was used in a television commercial for the orange drink called Kirin Orange (Japanese: キリンオレンジ).
- Lens Eye (Japanese: レンズ・アイ) (1981)
- Negai (Japanese: ねがい) (1982). Released 21 May 1982. This song was used in the closing credits, and the song "Chikyu Wa Concert Hall" (Japanese: 地球はコンサート・ホール) on the B side was used in the opening title sequence, of the television programme Shizen Wandafuru (Japanese: 自然ワンダフル).
- Ai No Jidai (Japanese: 愛の時代) (1983)
- Otomodachi (Japanese: お友達) (1984)
- Pianissimo De... (Japanese: ピアニッシモで...) (1984)

The following single was released by Fun House (Japanese: ファンハウス):

- Hyakuman Hon No Bara (Japanese: 百万本のバラ) (1988). Released 25 May 1988.

=== Studio albums ===
The following studio albums were released by CBS/Sony:

- Yumegatari (1979)
- Tenkai (1980)
- Saudade (1980). This album includes music influenced by fado.
- Airmail Special (Japanese: エアメール・スペシャル) (1981). This album includes songs that have, in the 21st century, been described as city pop and included in compilations of city pop.
- Mishiranu Hito Denaku (Japanese: 見知らぬ人でなく) (1982)
- Nefertiti (Japanese: ネフェルティティ) (1983)
- Yoruno Sokowa Yawarakana Maboroshi (Japanese: 夜の底は柔らかな幻) (1984). The 2013 novel of the same name, by Riku Onda, is named after this album.

The following studio album was released by Michtam Records (Japanese: ミクタムレコード):

- Tehillim 33 (Japanese: テヒリーム33) (1987)

The following studio album was released by MMP, a division of Maki Music Production:

- Hajime no hi (Japanese: はじめの日) (1996). Reissued 2000.

The following studio album was released by MIDI inc (Japanese:株式会社ミディ):

- Tenshi No Pan Kume Sayuri Sanbika Shu (Japanese: 天使のパン くめさゆり・さんびか集) (2009)

The following studio album was released by Life Creation (Japanese: ライフ・クリエイション):

- 7carats+1 (2017). This album is a collaboration with two other singers.

=== Compilation albums ===
The following compilation albums were released by CBS/Sony:

- Saki Kubota (Japanese: 久保田早紀) (1981)
- The Best '83: Saki Kubota (Japanese: THE BEST '83 久保田早紀) (1982)
- Saki Kubota Best Selection (1984)
- Saki Kubota Best Collection: Kubota Saki Besuto Korekushon (Japanese: Saki Kubota Best Collection: 久保田早紀 ベスト・コレクション) (1985 and 1986)

The following compilation albums were released Sony Records:

- Saki Kubota Best of Best: Kubota Saki Besuto obu Besuto (Japanese: Saki Kubota Best of Best: 久保田早紀 ベスト・オブ・ベスト) (1992)
- Saki Kubota Best Collection: Kubota Saki Besuto Korekushon (Japanese: Saki Kubota Best Collection: 久保田早紀 ベスト・コレクション) (1995). This was a The CD Club CD.

The following compilation album was released by Sony Music Entertainment (Japan) Inc:

- Golden J-Pop/The Best Saki Kubota (Japanese: GOLDEN J-POP/THE BEST 久保田早紀) (1997)

The following compilation albums were released by Sony Music House:

- Dream Price 1000 Saki Kubota Ihojin (Japanese: DREAM PRICE 1000 久保田早紀 異邦人) (2001)
- Golden Best Saki Kubota (Japanese: GOLDEN☆BEST 久保田早紀) (2002)

The following compilation albums were released by Sony Music Direct:

- CD & DVD The Best Saki Kubota Singles (Japanese: CD & DVD THE BEST 久保田早紀 シングルズ) (2005) is a greatest hits album (Wasei-eigo: best album) that includes all the songs from her singles, and the DVD of her farewell concert.
- 999 Best Saki Kubota (Japanese: 999 Best 久保田早紀) (2006)
- Golden Best Saki Kubota Singles (Japanese: GOLDEN☆BEST 久保田早紀 シングルズ). Released 19 August 2009. There was also a limited edition Blu-spec CD.

The following compilation album was released on the Great Tracks label:

- The Essential Saki Kubota (Japanese: 久保田早紀 エッセンシャル) (2025). This album reached number 18 on the Oricon daily album chart. It reached number 74 on the Billboard Japan weekly "Top Albums Sales" physical sales chart.

== Songwriting credits ==
=== Lyricist and composer ===
Saki Kubota was the lyricist and composer of the following:

- "Luna" and "Azies", both sung by Yu Hayami. Included in the album Colorful Box.

=== Composer ===
Saki Kubota was the composer of the following:

- "Gondora Mūn" (Japanese: ゴンドラ・ムーン) (English: Gondola Moon), sung by Yu Hayami. Included in the album And I Love You.
- "Garasu No Machikado" (Japanese: ガラスの街角), sung by Yu Hayami. B-side of the single Love Light, released on 21 July 1982, which reached number 38 on the Oricon chart.
- "Lady Of The Wind", sung by Agnes Chan. Single released in 1983.

== Books ==
She published the book Kaisōroku: gogo no pēji kara (Japanese: 回想録-午後の頁から...) in 1993. She published her autobiography, Futari No Iho Jin (Japanese: ふたりの異邦人), in 2019.

== See also ==
- Saki Kubota discography
- Ihojin
