= Japan Record Award for Best New Artist =

Japanese music award

- Country: Japan
- Presented by: Japan Composers' Association

The Japan Record Award for Best New Artist (最優秀新人賞) is awarded annually. Until the 10th Japan Record Awards it was called the New Artist Award. Starting with the 11th, it has been called the Best New Artist Award. All artists awarded the New Artist Award are automatically nominated for the Best New Artist Award.

== 1960s ==
Year	New Artist Award
1960	Yukio Hashi – "Itako Gasa"
1961	Miki Nakasone – "Kawa ga Nagareru"; Miyuki Yamanaka – "Dancho no Ojōsan"; Kōji Hirano – "Shiroi Hana no Blues"; Akira Matsushima – "Koshū"; Tatsumi Fujino – "Musume Sandogasa"; Utako Yanagi – "Saihate no Uta"
1962	Saburō Kitajima – "Namidabune"; Chieko Baisho – "Shitamachi no Taiyō"
1963	Kazuo Funaki – "Gakuen Hiroba", "Kōkō San Nen-sei"; Akemi Misawa – "Shima no Blues", "Watashi mo Nagare no Wataridori"
1964	Teruhiko Saigō – "Kimi dake o", "17-sai no Kono Mune ni" Harumi Miyako – "Anko Tsubaki wa Koi no Hana"
1965	Babu Satake – "Onnagokoro no Uta"; Miyoko Tashiro – "Aishite Aishite Aishichata no yo"
1966	Ichirō Araki – "Sora ni Hoshi ga aru Yō ni" Tokiko Kato – "Akai Fusen"
1967	Hidekazu Nakai – "Koibito to Yonde Mitai"; Naomi Sagara – "Sekai wa Futari no Tame ni"
1968	Ken Yabuki – "Anata no Blues"; Kaori Kumi – "Kuchidzuke ga Kowai"; Pinky & Killers – "Koi no Kisetsu"

== 1970s ==
Year	Best New Artist Award	New Artist Award
1969	Peter – "Yoru to Asa no Aida ni"	Norihiko Hashida and the Shoebelts – "Kaze"; Hiroshi Uchiyamada and Cool Five – "Nagasaki wa Kyō mo Amedatta"; Kaoru Chiga – "Mayonaka no Guitar"; Kyōko Takada – "Minna Yume no Naka"
1970	Akira Nishikino – "Mō Koi na no ka"	Mari Henmi – "Keiken"; Masaki Nomura – "Ichido dake nara"; Ritsuko Abe – "Ai no Kizuna"; Salty Sugar – "Hashire Kotarō"
1971	Rumiko Koyanagi – "Watashi no Jōkamachi"	Saori Minami – "17-sai"; Naoki Hongō – "Moeru Koibito"; Ouyang Fei Fei – "Ame no Midōsuji"; Simons – "Koibito mo Inai no ni"
1972	Megumi Asaoka – "Mebae"	Aoi Sankaku Jōgi – "Taiyō ga Kureta Kisetsu"; Hiromi Go – "Otoko no Ko Onna no Ko"; Eiji Miyoshi – "Ame"; Masako Mori – "Sensei"
1973	Junko Sakurada – "Watashi no Aoi Tori"	Miyoko Asada – "Akai Fusen"; Maria Anzai – "Namida no Taiyō"; Shizue Abe – "Coffee Shop de"; Agnes Chan – "Sōgen no Kagayaki"
1974	Yōko Aso – "Tōhikō"	Yūko Asano – "Koi wa Dan Dan"; Tsutomu Arakawa – "Taiyō no Nichiyōbi"; Michiru Jo – "Iruka ni Notta Shōnen"; Teresa Teng – "Kūkō"; Mineko Nishikawa – "Anata ni Ageru"
1975	Takashi Hosokawa – "Kokoro Nokori"	Hiromi Iwasaki – "Romance"; Junko Ogawa – "Yoru no Hōmonsha"; Nagisa Katahira – "Utsukushii Chigiri"; Hiromi Ōta – "Amadare"
1976	Yasuko Naitō – "Omoide Boro Boro"	Yoshimi Ashikawa – "Yuki Gomori"; Hiroshi Kadokawa – "Uso de mo Ii no"; Kenji Niinuma – "Yome ni Konai ka"; Pink Lady – "Pepper Keibu"
1977	Kentaro Shimizu – "Shitsuren Restaurant"	Karyudo – "Azusa 2-gō"; Ikue Sakakibara – "Al Pacino + Alain Delon < Anata"; Mizue Takada – "Garasuzaka"; Yosuke Tagawa – "Lui-Lui"
1978	Machiko Watanabe – "Kamome ga Tonda Hi"	Machiko Watanabe – "Kamome ga Tonda Hi"; Mako Ishino – "Shitsuren Kinenbi"; Mineyuki Satō – "Aoba-jō Koi Uta"; Teppei Shibuya – "Deep"; Rie Nakahara – "Tokyo Lullaby"; Masanori Sera & Twist – "Hikigane" (declined award)
1979	Tomoko Kuwae – "Watashi no Heart wa Stop Motion"	Tomoko Kuwae – "Watashi no Heart wa Stop Motion"; Nozomi Inoue – "Suki dakara"; Mariko Tsubota – "How! Wonderful"; Mariya Takeuchi – "September"; Nobue Matsubara – "Onna no Debune"

== 1980s ==
Year	Best New Artist Award	New Artist Award
1980	Toshihiko Tahara – "Hattoshite! Good"	Toshihiko Tahara – "Hattoshite! Good"; Yoshimi Iwasaki – "Anata Iro no Manon"; Naoko Kawai – "Yankee Boy"; Seiko Matsuda – "Aoi Sangoshou"; Kazuko Matsubara – "Kaette koi yo"
1981	Masahiko Kondō – "Gin Gira Gin ni Sarigenaku"	Masahiko Kondō – "Gin Gira Gin ni Sarigenaku"; Takayuki Takemoto – "Terete Zin Zin"; Yūko to Yayoi – "Otōsan"; Yutaka Yamakawa – "Hakodate Honsen"; Hiroyuki Okita – "Hamidashi Champion"
1982	Shibugakitai – "100%... SO Kamo ne!	Shibugakitai – "100%... SO Kamo ne!; Hidemi Ishikawa – "Yurete Shōnan"; Yū Hayami – "Answer Song wa Aishū"; Chiemi Hori – "Machi Bouke"; Iyo Matsumoto – "Sentimental Journey"
1983	The Good-Bye – "Kimagure One Way Boy"	Hiroshi Itsuki – "Sasame Yuki"; Kenji Sawada – "Kimeteyaru Konya"; Harumi Miyako – "Naniwa Koi Shigure"; Shinichi Mori – "Fuyu no Riviera"; Aki Yashiro – "Nihonkai"
1984	Yukiko Okada – "Dreaming Girl: Koi, Hajimemashite"	Yukiko Okada – "Dreaming Girl: Koi, Hajimemashite"; Issei Fūbi Sepia – "Zenryaku, Michi no Ue Yori"; Momoko Kikuchi – "Summer Eyes"; Kōji Kikkawa – "Monika"; Sally – "Virgin Blue"
1985	Miho Nakayama – "C"	Miho Nakayama – "C"; Minako Honda – "Temptation"; Akiko Kobayashi – "Koi ni Ochite (Fall in Love)"; Miyoko Yoshimoto – "Ame wa High School"; Noriko Matsumoto – "Sayonara to Iwarete"
1986	Shonentai – "Kamen Butōkai"	Shonentai – "Kamen Butōkai"; Akemi Ishii – "Cha-Cha-Cha"; Tomomi Nishimura – "Watashi Dreaming"; Mariko – "Yume Hikō"; Mari Mizutani – "Otome Biyori"
1987	Risa Tachibana – "Kimi wa Don to Kurai"	Risa Tachibana – "Kimi wa Don to Kurai"; Noriko Sakai – "No Re Na I Teen-age"; Fuyumi Sakamoto – "Abare Daiko"; Rie Hanada – "Hito Mishiri"; BaBe – "I Don't Know!"
1988	Otokogumi – "Daybreak"	Otokogumi – "Daybreak"; Eri Aikawa – "AB Complex"; Kaori Kozai – "Ame Sakaba"; Chika Nakamura – "89-banme no Seiza"; Buck-Tick – "Just One More Kiss"; Sakura Yamato – "Ōshō Ichidai Koharu Shigure
1989	Marcia – "Furimukeba Yokohama"	Marcia – "Furimukeba Yokohama"; Yoshito Owase – "Koi Yadori"; Miwa Kawagoe – "Yume dake Miteru"; Shin Kouda – "Otoko Dōshi"; Eriko Tamura – "Shinken"

== 1990s ==
Year	Best New Artist Award	New Artist Award
1990	Ninja – "Omatsuri Ninja" (pop); Tama – "Sayonara Jinrui" (rock); Yang Soo Kyung – "Aisarete Serenade" (kayōkyoku); Saori Hareyama – "Ichiendama no Tabi garasu" (enka)	
1991	Mi-Ke – "Omoide no Ku Jū Kurihama"	Mi-Ke – "Omoide no Ku Jū Kurihama"; Michiyo Nakajima – "Aoi Hanataba"; Noriyuki Makihara – "Donna Toki mo."; Alisa Mizuki – "Densetsu no Shōjo"
1992	Masatoshi Ono – "You're the Only..."	Masatoshi Ono – "You're the Only..."; Maki Ohguro – "Da Ka Ra"; Noriko Katō – "Kondo Watashi Doko ka Tsurete itte Kudasai yo"; Yoko Takahashi – "Miss You Again"
1993	Yasuhiro Yamane – "Get Along Together"	Yasuhiro Yamane – "Get Along Together"; Mari Kunitake – "Pocket Bell ga Naranakute"; Shū Pinsei – "Passing Love"
1994	Yuki Nishio – "Kaikyō Koiuta"	Yuki Nishio – "Kaikyō Koiuta"; Be-B – "Dōmu (Fū ni Mukatte)"; Ryūko Mizuta – "Tosa no Onnabushi"
1995	Junko Miyama – "Momo to Ringo no Monogatari"	Junko Miyama; Tomomi Kahara; Haruka Yabuki
1996	Puffy – "Asia no Junshin"	Puffy; Speed; Dos
1997	Rina Chinen – "Precious Delicious"	Rina Chinen; Kazuya Iwade; Saruganseki
1998	Morning Musume – "Daite Hold on Me!"	Morning Musume; Ami Suzuki; Tohko
1999	Amika Hattan – "Shooting Star"	Amika Hattan; Taiyō to Ciscomoon; Satoko Yamamoto; Seiji Wada

== 2000s ==
Year	Best New Artist Award	New Artist Award
2000	Kiyoshi Hikawa – "Hakone Hachiri no Hanjirō"	Kiyoshi Hikawa; Earth; Cheuni
2001	W-inds – "Paradox"	W-inds; Shinobu Otowa; Zone
2002	Mika Nakashima – "Stars"	Mika Nakashima; Sachiko Shiina; Day After Tomorrow; Lead
2003	Yo Hitoto – "Morai Naki"	Yo Hitoto; Sayaka Kamizono; Shy; Kanako Minami
2004	Ai Ōtsuka – "Sakuranbo"	Ai Ōtsuka – "Sakuranbo"; Takeshi Kitayama – "Katamichi Kippu"; Ayaka Hirahara – "Jupiter"; Aiko Moriyama – "Onna Bushi"
2005	AAA – "Blood on Fire"	O's; AAA; Nakanomori Band; High and Mighty Color
2006	Ayaka – "Mikazuki"	Ayaka; SunSet Swish; Aki Yamamoto; WaT
2007	Cute – "Tokaikko Junjō"	Cute – "Tokaikko Junjō"; Jyongri – "(Yakusoku)"; Stephanie – "Kimi ga Iru Kagiri"; Satomi Takasugi – "Habibito"
2008	Jero – "Umeyuki"	Jero – "Umeyuki"; Girl Next Door – "Gūzen no Kakuritsu"; Kimaguren – "Life"; Mai Fukui – "Ai no Uta"; Kumiko Sakurai – "Abare-sen"
2009	Big Bang – "Gara Gara Go!"	Big Bang – "Gara Gara Go!"; Maya Sakura – "Tairyō Matsuri"; Scandal – "Shōjo S"; Hilcrhyme – "Shunkashūtō"

== 2010s ==
Year	Best New Artist Award	New Artist Award
2010	S/mileage – "Yume Miru 15"	S/mileage – "Yume Miru 15"; Iconiq – "Change Myself"; Madoka Kikuchi – "Hito Koi Sansa"; Girls' Generation – "Gee
2011	Fairies	Fairies; Miyu Itō; Super Girls; 2NE1
2012	Leo Ieiri	Leo Ieiri; Misaki Usuzawa; Erena Ono; Tīna Karīna
2013	Kōta Shinzato	Kōta Shinzato; Kōhei Fukuda; Konomi Mori; Juice=Juice
2014	Mariya Nishiuchi	Mariya Nishiuchi; Sakurako Ōhara; Solidemo; Yūki Tokunaga
2015	Magnolia Factory	Magnolia Factory; lol; Natsumi Hanaoka; Rei Yasuda
2016	iKon	iKon; Satoshi Hayashibe; Mizuki Hayama; Boys and Men
2017	Camellia Factory	Camellia Factory; Takuya Nakazawa; Nobu; Unione
2018	Yuto Tatsumi	STU48; Yuto Tatsumi; Chuning Candy; BiSH
2019	Beyooooonds	Ryouta Kaizou; Beyooooonds; Leon Niihama; Ryuusei

== 2020s ==
Year	Best New Artist Award	New Artist Award
2020	Naoki Sanada	Naoki Sanada; Novelbright; Mameshiba no Taigun; Rin-ne
2021	Macaroni Enpitsu	INI; Taeko; Macaroni Enpitsu; Luca Mochizuki
2022	Aimi Tanaka	Hanna Ishikawa; Ocha Norma; Aimi Tanaka; Yuuki Tani
2023	Fruits Zipper	Tetsuji Kimura; Fruits Zipper; Aozora ni Tsuite Kangaeru; Lil League from Exile Tribe

== See also ==
- Japan Record Award
