= Japan Record Awards =

Japanese music awards show

Japan Record Award
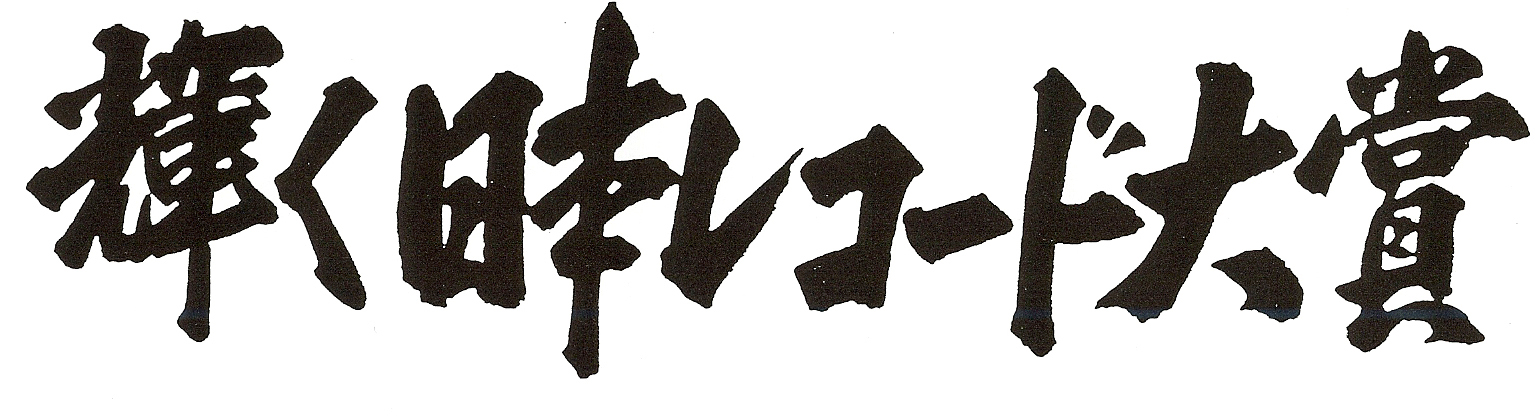
- Awarded for: Outstanding achievements in the record industry
- Country: Japan
- Presented by: Japan Composer's Association
- First award: December 27, 1959; 66 years ago
- Website: Official website

The Japan Record Awards (日本レコード大賞, Nihon Rekōdo Taishō) is a major music awards show, held annually in Japan that recognizes outstanding achievements in the Japan Composer's Association. Established in 1959, the Japan Record Awards are one of the oldest and most prestigious music awards in the country.

Until 2005, the show aired on New Year's Eve, but has since aired every December 30 on TBS Japan at 6:30 pm JST and is hosted by many announcers. Exile holds the record for most Grand Prix wins, with four awards.

== Grand Prix shield ==
The shield itself, designed by painter Seiji Togo.

== Categories ==
The Japan Record Awards include, but are not limited to, four awards which are not restricted by genre. All of the awards would be published in advance, except for the Grand Prix and Best New Artist Award, which would be announced at the ceremony.

=== Main categories ===
- New Artist Award (新人賞) – automatically nominates four best new artists for the ‘Best New Artist Award,’ which will select the top debuting artist from the four winners.
- Best New Artist Award (最優秀新人賞) – awarded to a performer who releases, during the Eligibility Year, the first recording which establishes the public identity of that artist (which may not necessarily be their first proper release).
- Excellent Work Award (優秀作品賞)– automatically nominates ten artists and songs for the ‘Grand Prix Award,’ which will select the artist and song from the ten winners.
- Grand Prix of Japan Record Award (日本レコード大賞) – The award is given to a work that has received strong support from the public through excellent singing, outstanding artistry, originality, and planning through composition, lyrics, and arrangement. The works selected for the top 10 "Excellent Work Award" will be judged.

=== Other categories ===
- Best Vocal Performance Award (最優秀歌唱賞) – awarded to the best singer.
- Best Album Award (最優秀アルバム賞) – awarded to the performer and the production team of a full album.
- Excellence Album Award (優秀アルバム賞)
- Best Composer Award (作曲賞)
- Best Arranger Award (編曲賞)
- Best Lyricist Award (作詩賞)
- Planning Award (企画賞)
- Achievement Award (功労賞)
- Special Award (特別賞)
- Special International Music Award (特別国際音楽賞)
- Lifetime Achievement Award (特別功労賞)
- Japan Composer's Association Award (日本作曲家協会選奨)

== List of Japan Record Award Grand Prix winners ==
| Bout | Year | | Song | Artist | Label |
|---|---|---|---|---|---|
| 1 | 1959 | | "Kuroi Hanabira" | Hiroshi Mizuhara | Toshiba Music |
| 2 | 1960 | | "Dare yori mo Kimi o Aisu" | Kazuko Matsuo; Hiroshi Wada and Mahinastars | JVC Victor |
| 3 | 1961 | | "Kimi Koishi" | Frank Nagai | JVC Victor |
| 4 | 1962 | | "Itsu demo Yume o" | Yukio Hashi; Sayuri Yoshinaga | JVC Victor |
| 5 | 1963 | | "Konnichiwa Aka-chan" | Michiyo Azusa | King Records |
| 6 | 1964 | | "Ai to Shi o Mitsumete" | Kazuko Aoyama | Nippon Columbia |
| 7 | 1965 | | "Yawara" | Hibari Misora | Nippon Columbia |
| 8 | 1966 | | "Muhyo" | Yukio Hashi | JVC Victor |
| 9 | 1967 | | "Blue Chateau" | Jackey Yoshikawa and His Blue Comets | Nippon Columbia |
| 10 | 1968 | | "Tenshi no Yuwaku" | Jun Mayuzumi | Toshiba Music |
| 11 | 1969 | | "Ii ja nai no Shiawase naraba" | Naomi Sagara | JVC Victor |
| 12 | 1970 | | "Kyo de Owakare" | Yoichi Sugawara | Polydor |
| 13 | 1971 | | "Mata Au Hi Made" | Kiyohiko Ozaki | Phonogram |
| 14 | 1972 | | "Kassai" | Chiaki Naomi | Nippon Columbia |
| 15 | 1973 | | "Yozora" | Hiroshi Itsuki | Tokuma Music |
| 16 | 1974 | | "Erimo Misaki" | Shinichi Mori | Victor Music |
| 17 | 1975 | | "Cyclamen no Kaori" | Akira Fuse | King Records |
| 18 | 1976 | | "Kita no Yado kara" | Harumi Miyako | Nippon Columbia |
| 19 | 1977 | | "Katteni-Shiyagare" | Kenji Sawada | Polydor |
| 20 | 1978 | | "UFO" | Pink Lady | Victor Music |
| 21 | 1979 | | "Miserarete" | Judy Ongg | CBS Sony |
| 22 | 1980 | | "Ame no Bojo" | Aki Yashiro | Teichiku |
| 23 | 1981 | | "Ruby no Yubiwa" | Akira Terao | Toshiba EMI |
| 24 | 1982 | | "Kitasakaba" | Takashi Hosokawa | Nippon Columbia |
| 25 | 1983 | | "Yagiri no Watashi" | Takashi Hosokawa | Nippon Columbia |
| 26 | 1984 | | "Nagaragawa Enka" | Hiroshi Itsuki | Tokuma Japan |
| 27 | 1985 | | "Meu amor é..." | Akina Nakamori | Warner Pioneer |
| 28 | 1986 | | "Desire (Jōnetsu)" | Akina Nakamori | Warner Pioneer |
| 29 | 1987 | | "Orokamono" | Masahiko Kondō | CBS Sony |
| 30 | 1988 | | "Paradise Ginga" | Hikaru Genji | Pony Canyon |
| 31 | 1989 | | "Samishii Nettaigyo" | Wink | Polystar |
| 32 | 1990 | Enka | "Koi Uta Tsuzuri" | Takao Horiuchi | Polystar |
| 32 | 1990 | Pops | "Odoru Pompokolin" | B.B.Queens | BMG Japan |
| 33 | 1991 | Enka | "Kita no Daichi" | Saburo Kitajima | Nippon Crown |
| 33 | 1991 | Pops | "Ai wa Katsu" | Kan | Polydor |
| 34 | 1992 | Enka | "Shiroi Kaikyo" | Miyako Otsuki | King Records |
| 34 | 1992 | Pops | "Kimi ga Iru Dake de" | Kome Kome Club | Sony Music |
| 35 | 1993 | | "Mugonzaka" | Kaori Kozai | Polydor Records |
| 36 | 1994 | | "Innocent World" | Mr. Children | Toy's Factory |
| 37 | 1995 | | "Overnight Sensation" | TRF | Avex |
| 38 | 1996 | | "Don't Wanna Cry" | Namie Amuro | Avex |
| 39 | 1997 | | "Can You Celebrate?" | Namie Amuro | Avex |
| 40 | 1998 | | "Wanna Be A Dreammaker" | Globe | Avex |
| 41 | 1999 | | "Winter, again" | Glay | Unlimited Records |
| 42 | 2000 | | "Tsunami" | Southern All Stars | Victor Entertainment |
| 43 | 2001 | | "Dearest" | Ayumi Hamasaki | Avex |
| 44 | 2002 | | "Voyage" | Ayumi Hamasaki | Avex |
| 45 | 2003 | | "No Way to Say" | Ayumi Hamasaki | Avex |
| 46 | 2004 | | "Sign" | Mr. Children | Toy's Factory |
| 47 | 2005 | | "Butterfly" | Koda Kumi | Rhythm Zone (Avex) |
| 48 | 2006 | | "Ikken" | Kiyoshi Hikawa | Columbia Music Entertainment |
| 49 | 2007 | | "Tsubomi" | Kobukuro | Warner Music Japan |
| 50 | 2008 | | "Ti Amo" | Exile | Rhythm Zone (Avex) |
| 51 | 2009 | | "Someday" | Exile | Rhythm Zone (Avex) |
| 52 | 2010 | | "I Wish For You" | Exile | Rhythm Zone (Avex) |
| 53 | 2011 | | "Flying Get" | AKB48 | You! Be Cool! (King Records) |
| 54 | 2012 | | "Manatsu no Sounds Good!" | AKB48 | You! Be Cool! (King Records) |
| 55 | 2013 | | "Exile Pride: Konna Sekai o Aisuru Tame" | Exile | Rhythm Zone (Avex) |
| 56 | 2014 | | "R.Y.U.S.E.I." | Sandaime J Soul Brothers from Exile Tribe | Rhythm Zone (Avex) |
| 57 | 2015 | | "Unfair World" | Sandaime J Soul Brothers from Exile Tribe | Rhythm Zone (Avex) |
| 58 | 2016 | | "Anata no Suki na Tokoro" | Kana Nishino | Sony Japan |
| 59 | 2017 | | "Influencer" | Nogizaka46 | Sony Japan |
| 60 | 2018 | | "Synchronicity" | Nogizaka46 | Sony Japan |
| 61 | 2019 | | "Paprika" | Foorin | Sony Japan |
| 62 | 2020 | | "Homura" | LiSA | Sony Japan |
| 63 | 2021 | | "Citrus" | Da-iCE | Avex |
| 64 | 2022 | | "Habit" | Sekai no Owari | Universal Japan |
| 65 | 2023 | | "Que Sera Sera" | Mrs. Green Apple | Universal Japan |
| 66 | 2024 | | "Lilac" | Mrs. Green Apple | Universal Japan |
| 67 | 2025 | | "Darling" | Mrs. Green Apple | Universal Japan |

== Most wins ==
- Including enka and pop artists.
- "Best Composer Award", "Best Arranger Award" and "Best Lyricist Award" are counted to the corresponding recipients rather than the singers.

=== Most wins in Grand Prix ===
| Rank | 1st | 2nd | 3rd |
|---|---|---|---|
| Artist | Exile | Ayumi Hamasaki; Mrs. Green Apple | Hiroshi Itsuki; Yukio Hashi; Takashi Hosokawa; Akina Nakamori; Mr.Children; Namie Amuro; AKB48; Sandaime; Nogizaka46 |
| Total awards | 4 | 3 | 2 |

=== Most overall wins ===
| Rank | Artist | Total awards |
|---|---|---|
| 1 | Hiroshi Itsuki | 28 |
| 2 | Kiyoshi Hikawa | 20 |
| 3 | Southern All Stars | 19 |
| 4 | AKB48 | 14 |
| 5 | Ayumi Hamasaki; Exile | 13 |
| 6 | Kenji Sawada | 12 |
| 7 | Aki Yashiro | 11 |
| 8 | w-inds Hideki Saijo | 10 |
| 9 | Seiko Matsuda; Yū Aku; Kana Nishino | 9 |
| 10 | Namie Amuro | 8 |

== Venues ==
- 1959: Bunkyō Kōkaidō
- 1960–1961, 1965: Kanda Kyōritsu Kōdō
- 1962–1964, 1966: Hibiya Public Hall
- 1967–1968: Shibuya Public Hall
- 1969–1984: Imperial Garden Theater
- 1985–1993: Nippon Budokan
- 1994–2003: TBS Broadcasting Center
- 2004–present: New National Theatre
