= Sukiyaki and Other Japanese Hits =

Studio album by Kyu Sakamoto
- Released: 1963
- Recorded: Tokyo
- Genre: Kayokyoku, vocal
- Label: Capitol

Professional ratings
Review scores
Source	Rating
Allmusic	3/5 stars

Sukiyaki and Other Japanese Hits is an album by Japanese singer Kyu Sakamoto released in 1963 in the United States by Capitol Records. All of the songs on the album are performed in Japanese and feature the title track, a #1 hit in the U.S. for three weeks in 1963, and peaking at #6 in the UK when issued by EMI on its His Master's Voice label. The 'b'-side, "Anoko No Namaewa Nantenkana", and a cover of "Good Timin'", a hit in 1960 for R&B singer Jimmy Jones, in both the US and the UK.

The album is subtitled 坂本九の唄う日本のヒット歌集 (Sakamoto Kyu no Utau Nihon no Hitto Kashuu, lit. 'A Collection of Japanese Hit Songs Sung by Kyu Sakamoto').

The album was part of the "Capitol of the World" series. The album was originally released in mono, along with a duophonic (electronic stereo) version by Capitol Records, this being the singer's only full-length album in the West.

It was a solid success, reaching number 14 on the Billboard Top LPs Monoaural 150 chart and number 47 on the Billboard Top LPs Stereo 50 chart. It debuted at number 7 on the Variety Album Bestsellers chart and reached number 6 on that chart. It reached number 15 on the Cash Box Monoaural Top 100 albums chart, and number 25 on the Cash Box Stereo Top 50 albums chart.

== Reception ==
The Billboard review of the album rated it as a Billboard pop spotlight pick. The album was also reviewed in High Fidelity, Variety and Cash Box. Sukiyaki . . . and other hits was reviewed in Pop Weekly.

== Track listing ==
Side one

1. Ue o muite arukō (Sukiyaki)
2. Tsun Tsun Bushi (The Tsun Tsun Song)
3. Hitoribocchi No Futari (The Lonesome Two)
4. Kyu-chan Ondo (The Kyu-Chan Folk March Song)
5. Mo Hitori No Boku (It's Just Not the Real Me)
6. Good Timin'

Side two

1. Boku No Hoshi (My Star)
2. Kiminanka Kiminanka (I Couldn't Care for You, Not You, Not You!)
3. Kyu-chan No Zuntatatta (The Zuntatatta Song)
4. Hige No Uta (My First Whisker)
5. Goodbye, Joe
6. Anoko No Namaewa Nantenkana (I Wonder What Her Name Is)

== Personnel ==
- 1-1, 1-3, 2-2, 2-4, 2-6 (Rokusuke Ei/Hachidai Nakamura); 1-2 (Kyu Sakamoto/Trad, arr Hiroaki "Tessho" Hagiwara); 1-4, 2-3 (Yukio Aoshima/Danny Iida); 1-5 (Yukio Aoshima/Hachidai Nakamura); 1-6 (Fred Tobias/Clint Ballard, Jr./Kenji Sazanami); 2-1 (Yoji Yamada/Danny Iida); 2-5 (Hans-Artur Wittstatt/Günter Loose/Norman Newell/Kenji Sazanami)
- recorded in Tokyo by Koji Kusano
- produced in the U.S.A. by Dave Dexter, Jr.

== See also ==
- 1963 in Japanese music
