= 1st Japan Record Awards =

1959 Japanese music awards ceremony

- Date: 27 December 1959
- Venue: Bunkyo City Hall

The 1st Japan Record Awards were held on 27 December 1959. They recognized musical accomplishments by performers for the year 1959. Hiroshi Mizuhara won the Grand Prix award, defeated Frank Nagai by a vote.

== Award winners ==
=== Japan Record Award ===
- Hiroshi Mizuhara – "Kuroi Hanabira"
  - Lyricist: Rokusuke Ei
  - Composer: Hachidai Nakamura
  - Record Company: EMI Music Japan

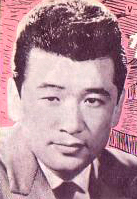
Frank Nagai, Vocalist Award winner.

=== Best Vocal Performance ===
- Frank Nagai – "Yogiri ni Kaeta Chalk"
  - Lyricist: Tetsuo Miyagawa
  - Composer: Masanobu Tokuchi

=== Lyricist Award ===
- Hachirou Satou – "Flute"
  - Singer: Chiyoko Shimakura
  - Composer: Yūji Koseki

=== Composer Award ===
- Masanobu Tokuchi – "Yogiri ni Kaeta Chalk"
  - Singer: Frank Nagai
  - Lyricist: Tetsuo Miyagawa

=== Children's Song Award ===
- Kamejirō Ishii and King Hōzuki-kai – "Yasashii Oshō-san"
  - Lyricist: Shōgo Katō
  - Composer: Hideaki Yashima
