= 1963 in Japanese music =

In 1963 (Shōwa 38), Japanese music was released on records, and there were charts, awards, contests and festivals.

== Awards, contests and festivals ==
The 6th Osaka International Festival (Japanese: 大阪国際フェスティバル) was held from 13 April to 6 May 1963. The 5th Japan Record Awards were held on 27 December 1963. The 14th NHK Kōhaku Uta Gassen was held on 31 December 1963.

The 12th Otaka prize was won by Yuzo Toyama and Makoto Moroi.

== Number one singles ==
=== Billboard ===
Utamatic

The following reached number 1 according to the weekly Utamatic singles chart published in Billboard:

- 5 January, 12 January, 19 January, 26 January and 2 February: L'Eclisse - Colletto Tempia (Japanese: コレット・テンピア) (Victor) and Mari Sono (Polydor)
- 9 February: Kiroko No Tango (Japanese: 霧子のタンゴ) - Frank Nagai
- 27 April, 4 May, 11 May, 18 May and 25 May: Shima Sodachi (Japanese: 島育ち) - Yoshio Tabata (Teichiku), Miki Nakasone (King) and Yukiji Asaoka (Toshiba). (Theme song of the film Shima Sodachi).
- 1 June, 8 June, 15 June, 22 June and 29 June: Akai Handkerchief - Yūjirō Ishihara. (Theme song of the film Red Handkerchief).
- 5 October, 12 October, 19 October, 26 October, 2 November, 9 November and 16 November: Kohkou 3-nen Sei - Kazuo Funaki
- 23 November, 30 November, 7 December: (You're the) Devil in Disguise - Elvis Presley
- 14 December, 21 December and 28 December: Yuuhi No Oka - Yūjirō Ishihara and Ruriko Asaoka (Theme song of the film Yuuhi No Oka)

=== Cash Box ===
Local

The following reached number 1 according to the weekly local singles chart published in Cash Box:

- 5 January, 12 January, 19 January, 26 January, 2 February, 9 February, 16 February, 2 March, 9 March and 16 March: Itsudemo Yume O - Yukio Hashi
- 23 March, 30 March, 20 April and 27 April: Kiroko No Tango (Japanese: 霧子のタンゴ) - Frank Nagai
- 6 April and 13 April: Hitoribotchi No Futari (Japanese: 一人ぼっちの二人) - Kyu Sakamoto
- 4 May, 11 May, 18 May, 8 June, 15 June, 22 June, 29 June, 3 August, 10 August, 17 August and 24 August: Shima Sodachi (Japanese: 島育ち) - Yukiji Asaoka
- 25 May, 1 June and 6 July: Akai Handkerchief - Yūjirō Ishihara. (Akai Hankachi).
- 13 July, 20 July and 27 July: Shussekaido (Japanese: 出世街道) - Midori Hatakeyama
- 31 August: Maikohan - Yukio Hashi
- 28 September, 5 October, 12 October, 19 October, 26 October, 2 November, 9 November: Kokoh Sannensei - Kazuo Funaki (Kohkou 3-nen Sei).
- 16 November and 22 November: Shugakuryoko (Japanese: 修学旅行) - Kazuo Funaki
- 30 November: Hoshizora Ni Ryoteo (Japanese: 星空に両手を) - Hiroshi Moriya and Chiyoko Shimakura
- 7 December, 14 December, 21 December, 28 December: Shiroi Seifuku - Yukio Hashi

International

The following reached number 1 according to the weekly international singles chart published in Cash Box:

- 5 January, 12 January, 19 January, 26 January, 2 February, 9 February and 16 February: L'Eclisse - Colletto Tempia (Japanese: コレット・テンピア) (Victor) and Mari Sono (Polydor)
- 23 February, 2 March, 9 March, 16 March, 27 April and 4 May: The Longest Day (Japanese: 史上最大の作戦のマーチ) - Mitch Miller (Columbia) and Shigeru Katsumi (Toshiba)
- 23 March: Return to Sender - Elvis Presley
- 30 March, 6 April and 20 April: Sherry - The Four Seasons (Vee Jay) and Paradise King (Toshiba)
- 11 May, 18 May and 25 May: Bobby's Girl - Marcie Blane (London), Mari Umeki (Toshiba), Yukari Itō (King), Kumiko Goto (Columbia), Susan Maughan (Philips) The Japanese name of this song is "Bobby Nikubittake" (Japanese: ボビーに首ったけ).
- 1 June, 8 June, 15 June, 22 June, 29 June, 6 July, 13 July, 20 July, 27 July, 3 August, 10 August, 17 August, 24 August and 31 August: Hey Paula - Paul & Paula (Philips), Paradise King (Toshiba), Michiyo Azusa and Yasuo Tanabe (King) and Elaine and Derek (Pye)
- 28 September and 5 October: Soundtrack of The Great Escape
- 12 October and 19 October: First Quarrel - Paul & Paula (Philips), Michiyo Azusa and Yasuo Tanabe (King) and S Kako and R Yasuoka (Toshiba) The Japanese name of this song is "Kenka De Deito" (けんかでデイト).
- 26 October, 2 November, 9 November, 16 November, 22 November and 30 November: (You're the) Devil in Disguise - Elvis Presley
- 7 December and 14 December: One Boy (Japanese: ワン・ポーイ) - Joanie Sommers
- 21 December and 28 December: 55 Days at Peking - The Brothers Four. (From the film 55 Days at Peking).

== Annual charts ==
Michiyo Azusa's Konnichiwa Akachan (Japanese: こんにちは赤ちゃん) was number 1 in the Japanese kayokyoku annual singles chart published in Billboard.

== Classical music ==
The Hiroshima Symphony Orchestra was established.

== Film and television ==
The music of Bad Girl and The Insect Woman, by Toshiro Mayuzumi, won the 18th Mainichi Film Award for Best Music.

== Music industry ==
56 million records were produced. There were an estimated 5,000 jukeboxes. Nippon Crown was established.

== Overseas ==
Kyu Sakamoto's single Sukiyaki reached number 1 in the United States.

== Albums ==
- Sukiyaki and Other Japanese Hits by Kyu Sakamoto

== See also ==
- Timeline of Japanese music
- 1963 in Japan
- 1963 in music
- w:ja:1963年の音楽
