= 16th Japan Record Awards =

1974 Japanese music awards ceremony

- Date: 31 December 1974
- Venue: Imperial Garden Theater, Tokyo
- Hosted by: Keizo Takahashi

Television/radio coverage
- Network: TBS

The 16th Annual Japan Record Awards took place at the Imperial Garden Theater in Chiyoda, Tokyo, on 31 December 1974, starting at 7:00PM JST. The primary ceremonies were televised in Japan on TBS.

The audience rating was 45.7%.

== Award winners ==
=== Japan Record Award ===
Shinichi Mori for "Erimo Misaki"

- Lyricist: Osami Okamoto
- Composer: Takuro Yoshida
- Arranger: Shunichi Makaino
- Record Company: JVC Victor

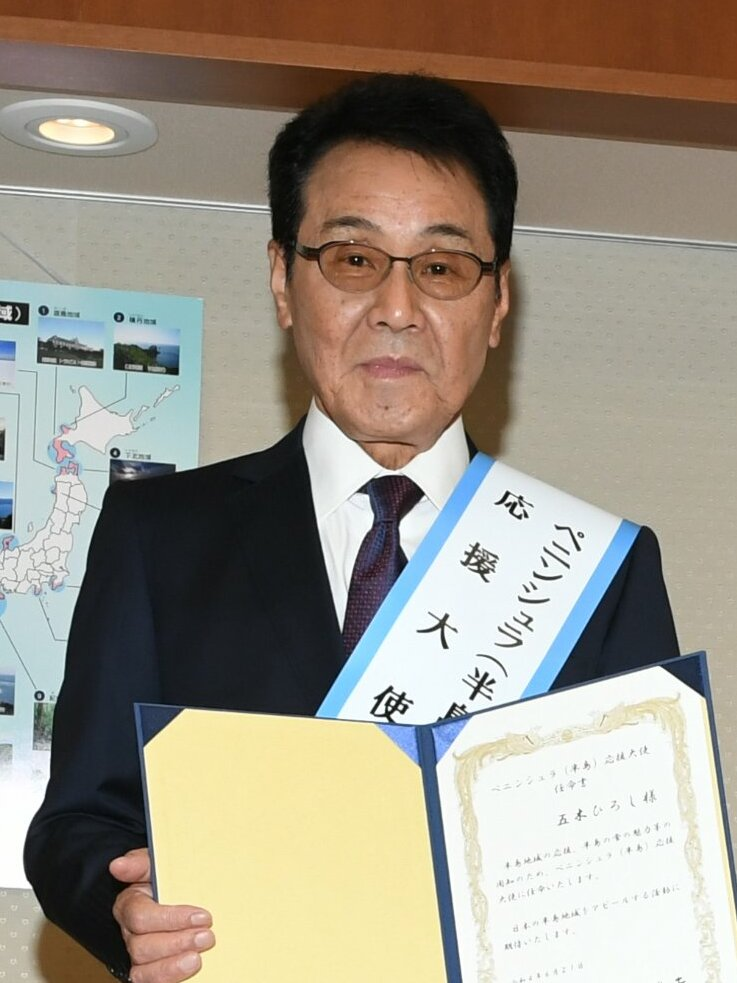
Hiroshi Itsuki, 4th time awarded in JRA, after awarded 2 vocalist award and JRA at the past 3 years.

=== Best Vocalist ===
Hiroshi Itsuki for "Miren"

=== Best New Artist ===
Youko Aso for "Touhikou"

=== Vocalist Award ===
- Kenji Sawada for "Tsuioku"
  - 2nd time awarded after 2 years, 2nd vocalist award.
- Aki Yashiro for "Ai No Shuunen"
  - Awarded again after last year, 2nd vocalist award.
- Hideki Saijo for "Kizudarake No Laura"
  - Awarded again after last year, 2nd vocalist award.
- Akira Fuse for "Tsumiki No Heya"

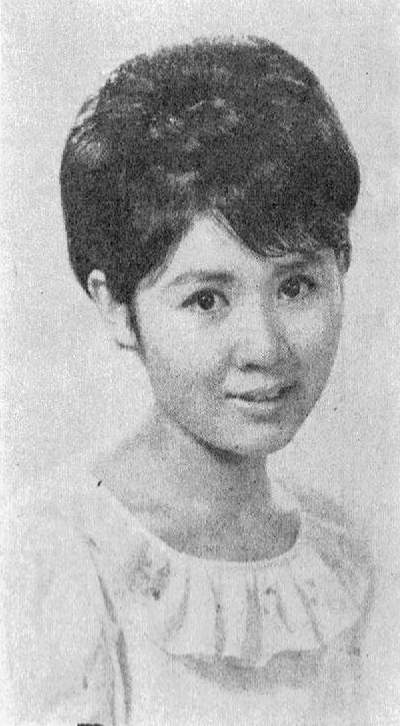
Michiyo Azusa, awarded again in JRA after her last award at 11 years ago.

=== General Public Award ===
- Momoe Yamaguchi for "Hito Natsu No Keiken"
- Tonosama Kings for "Namida No Misao"
- Michiyo Azusa for "Futari De Osake Wo"
- Kiyoshi Nakajyou for "Uso"

=== New Artist Award ===
- Tsutomu Arakawa for "Taiyō No Nichiyōbi"
- Teresa Teng for "Kuukou"
- Mineko Nishikawa for "Anata Ni Ageru"
- Michiru Jo for "Iruka Ni Notta Shounen"
- Yūko Asano for "Koi Wa Dandan"

=== Composer Award ===
- Kyōhei Tsutsumi for "Amai Seikatsu"
  - Singer: Goro Noguchi
  - Awarded again after 3 years, 3rd composer award.

=== Arranger Award ===
- Katz Hoshi for "Yūdachi"
  - Singer: Yōsui Inoue

=== Lyricist Award ===
- Masashi Sada for "Shourou Nagashi"
  - Singer: Grape

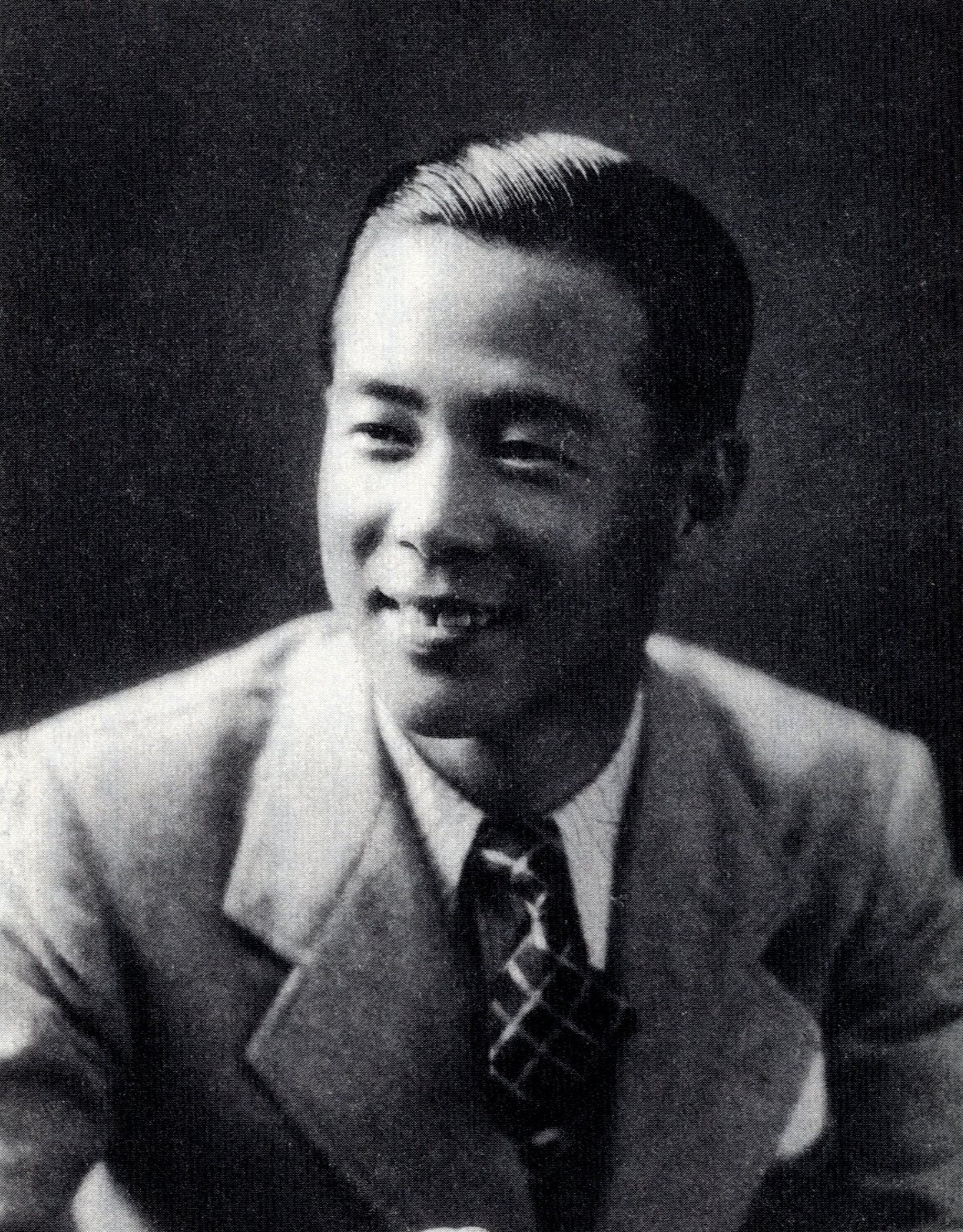
Ichirō Fujiyama, Special Award winner.

=== Special Award ===
- Rikizou Taya
  - Song: 'O sole mio
- Ichirō Fujiyama
  - Song: Aoi Sanmyaku

=== Planning Award ===
- Yōsui Inoue & Polydor Records for "Kori No Sekai"
- Kaientai & Elec Records for "Haha Ni Sasageru Ballad"

=== Young Idol Award ===
- Finger 5 for "Koi No American Football"

=== Shinpei Nakayama Award & Yaso Saijō Award ===
- Hiroshi Yokoi & Minoru Endou for "Shitamachi No Aoi Sora"
  - Singer: Masako Mori
- Kazuya Senke & Tadashi Yoshida for "Kyo Goyomi ~ Souji Okita ~"
  - Singer: Yukio Hashi

== See also ==
- 1974 in Japanese music
