= Hisako Manda =

Japanese actress (born 1958)

- 萬田久子
- Born: April 13, 1958 (age 68); Osaka
- Education: Tetsukayama University Junior College Department
- Occupations: Actress (film & television)
- Years active: 1980–present
- Known for: Miss Universe (1978)
- Notable credit(s): Nachan no shashinkan Kyōto satsujin annai Hacchōbori no shichinin
- Television: Kyōto satsujin annai was also a judge on the original Iron Chef
- Height: 167 cm (5 ft 6 in)

Hisako Manda (萬田 久子, Manda Hisako; born April 13, 1958, in Osaka) is a Japanese actress.

She represented Japan at Miss Universe 1978 in Acapulco, Mexico, but did not advance to the semifinals.

== Selected filmography ==
=== Film ===
- Maison Ikkoku: Apartment Fantasy (1986)
- Florence My Love (1991)
- The Inugamis (2006)
- Ryuzo and the Seven Henchmen (2015)
- The Setting Sun (2022)

=== TV series ===
- Natsu ni Koisuru Onnatachi (1983)
- Asa ga Kita (2015-2016)
- The Grand Family (2021)
- My Ex-Boyfriend's Last Will (2022), Mariko Morikawa
- House of the Owl (2024)

=== Dub ===
- Desperate Housewives (Susan Mayer)
