= Bunkyo Civic Center =

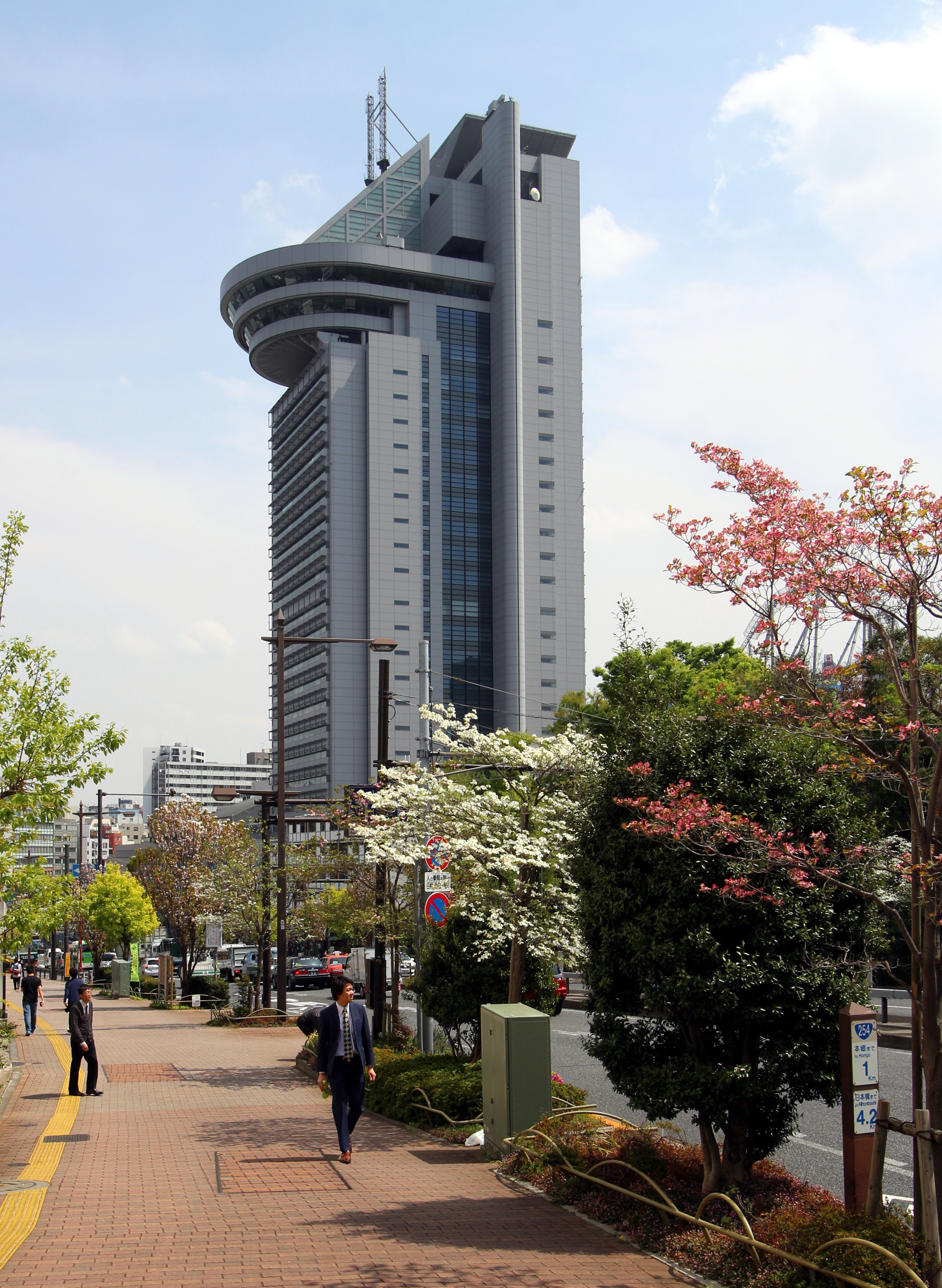

General information
- Status: Completed
- Type: Office
- Location: Bunkyō, Tokyo, Japan
- Coordinates: 35.707872°N 139.752424°E
- Completed: 1994

Height
- Roof: 146 m (479 ft)

Technical details
- Floor count: 28

Design and construction
- Architect: Nikken Sekkei Ltd.

The Bunkyo Civic Center (文京シビックセンター) is the government building for Bunkyo ward in Tokyo, Japan. Its 25th floor houses a free observation deck. The building was completed in 1994. It has been described as a "colossal Pez candy dispenser" by The Japan Times. The building is near the Tokyo Dome, Tokyo Dome Hotel, Tokyo Dome City, and Tokyo Dome City Attractions.

== History ==
Bunkyo Civic Center stands on the former site of the Bunkyo City Hall (文京公会堂), which opened in April 1959. This was the venue for the first Japan Record Awards. The city hall, which had excellent acoustics, was used mainly as a venue for classical music performances and concerts from the time of its opening until 1977.

In 1977 the building was found in violation of fire safety regulations imposed by the Japanese government, and was closed down. The government demolished the city hall and rebuilt it as a government building named Bunkyo Civic Center. The 142 metres (466 ft) tall civic center includes three basement floors and 28 floors above-ground, making it the tallest civic center in Tokyo. It has been in use since 1994.

== Facilities ==
Buildings of Shinjuku and Mount Fuji, viewed from the observation deck

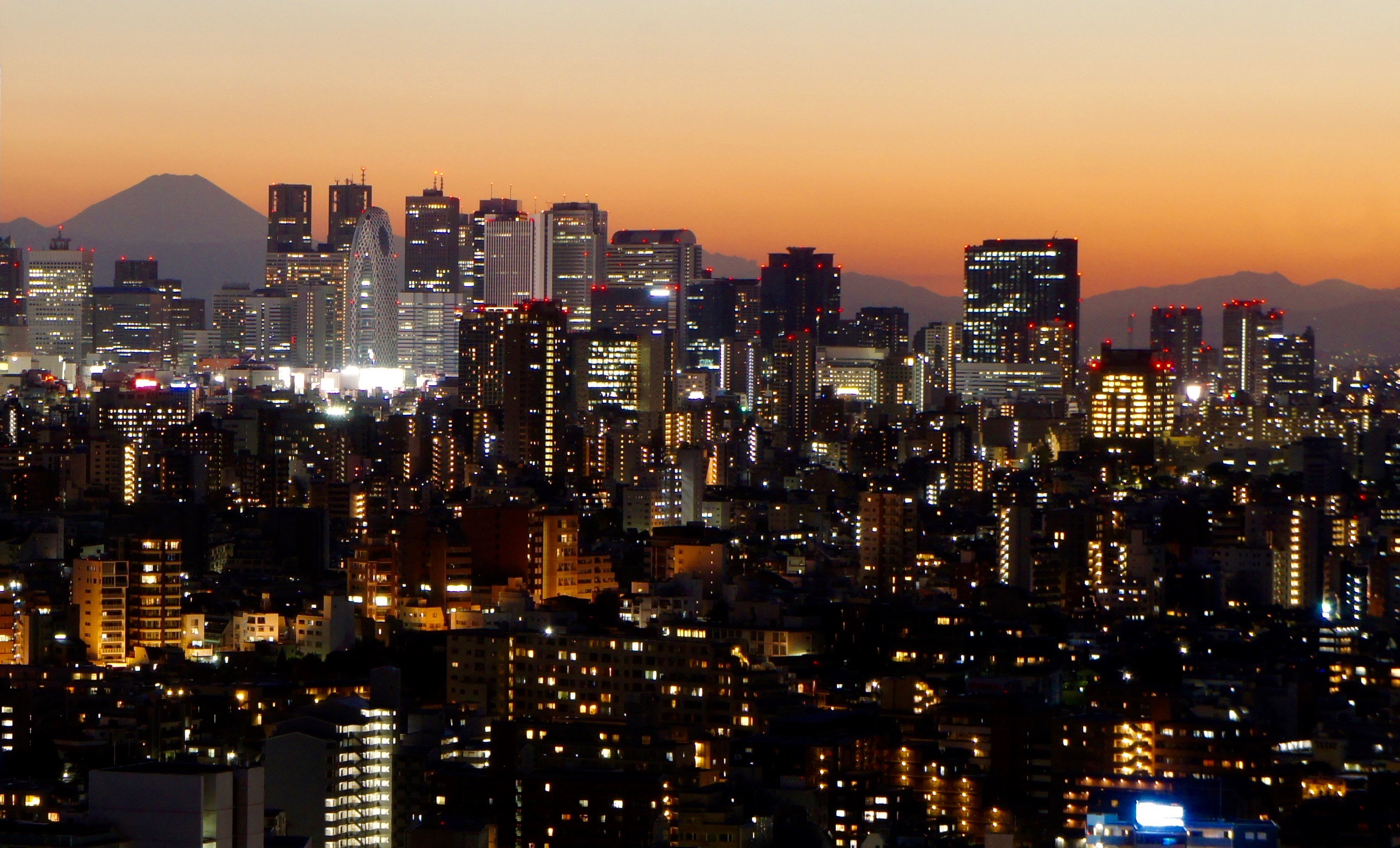
Night time view from the observation deck

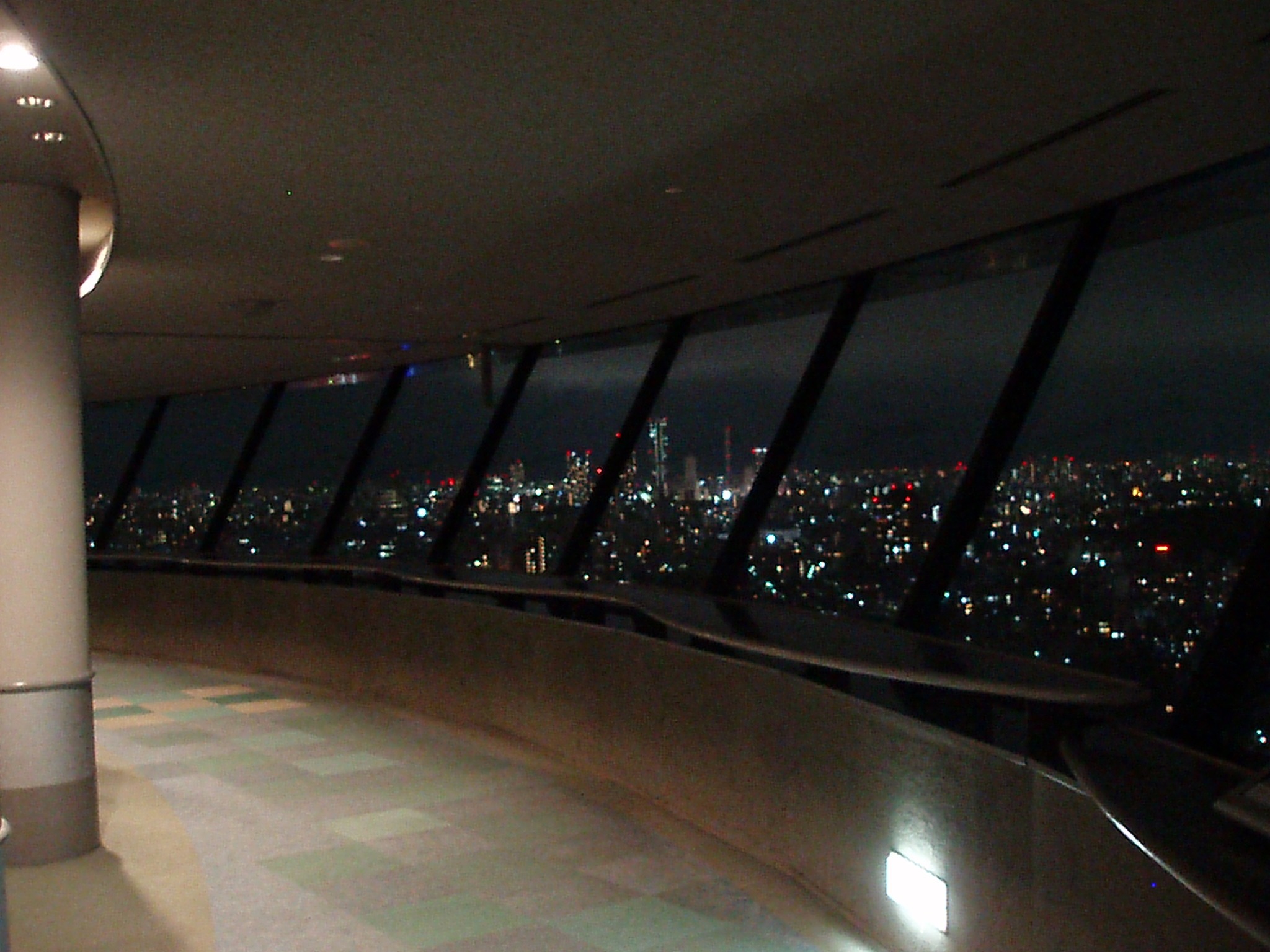
Observation deck at night

The Bunkyo Civic Center houses the municipal offices of Bunkyo, Tokyo Metropolis. Moreover, the building has the facilities for the usage of entertainment and sightseeing.

The first and second basement floor in the main building houses a study room and business facilities for the Academy Bunkyo and Industry and Life Plaza. Family Registration and Residents' Section is on the second floor. Center for Citizens on the third and fourth floor and there is an area for children's usage which is a short-term nursery service for citizens. Moreover, parents and children can be playing in Piyopiyo Hiroba on the fifth floor.

The 6th to 24th floors are mainly used for offices for Bunkyo City. The Notary Office is located on the 7th and 8th floors. The City Assembly Hall is located on the 24th floor, which the height is having approximately 100 meters that from the 22nd level.

The observation deck is located on the 25th floor of the Bunkyo Civic Center, 105 metres (344 ft) above-ground. It boasts a 330-degree panoramic view of Tokyo. The observation deck is encased in tilted glass windows to avoid indoor lighting reflection. Visitors can see Mount Tsukuba to the north, Tokyo Skytree to the east, and the buildings in Shinjuku and Mount Fuji if the sun is standing in the west. On the south side of the observation deck is a sightseeing lounge called Sky View Lounge.

For the podium of the building is the Bunkyo Entertainment Hall (文京シビックホール) for the use with entertainment which is the Main Hall (大ホール) and the Small Hall (小ホール) that featured as 1,802 and 371 seats respectively. In addition, there is a multi-purpose room, two practice rooms, two meeting rooms, two music rooms, a lecture room, and study rooms.
