= Yoshimi Ashikawa =

Japanese actress and singer

- 芦川 よしみ
- Born: 13 December 1958 (age 67); Tokyo
- Other names: Yoshimi Kono (real name); Yoshimi Awaya (粟屋芳美, Awaya Yoshimi)
- Occupations: Actress; singer
- Years active: 1969–present
- Television: Ude ni oboeari; Sugishi Hi no Serenade; Tsuki Umaya oen Jikenchō; Hachidai Shōgun Yoshimune
- Awards: Japan Record Awards Best New Artist Award (1976, "Yuki go mori")

Yoshimi Ashikawa (芦川 よしみ, Ashikawa Yoshimi; born 13 December 1958, in Tokyo) is a Japanese actress and singer. She graduated from Ono Gakuen Girls High School. Her real name is Yoshimi Kono (河野 芳美, Kōno Yoshimi). She is currently married (her husband is a doctor). She is represented with Office Mitsui.

== Main singles ==
Date	Title	Lyrics	Composition	Arrangement	C/w	Notes	Ref.
25 Jul 1976	Hanabi	Asei Kobayashi		Jiro Takekawa	Otonashi Kawa (l. Ryo Shoji; c. Kobayashi; arr Takekawa)	88th in Oricon	
Oct 1976	Yuki go mori	Asei Kobayashi		Jiro Takekawa	Sumidagawa (l. Ryo Shoji; c. Kobayashi; arr. Takekawa)	18th Japan Record Awards Best New Artist Award	
Jan 1977	Moeru Harudesu	Tatemi Yoshida	Masato Sugimoto	Shunichi Makaino	Sayonara no Īwake (l. Yoshida; c. Sugimoto; arr. by Makaino)		
Jun 1977	Suppai Natsu	Tatemi Yoshida	Masato Sugimoto	Koji Ryuzaki	Natsu wa Pukapuka (l. Yoshida; c. Sugimoto; arr. Ryuzaki)		
May 1978	Honmoku Bay Street	Yukinojo Mori		Koji Ryuzaki	Mikkai (l. Rei Nakanishi; c. Koichi Morita; arr. Ryuzaki)		
Jan 1979	Kanashimi Atsume	Daizo Saito	Keisuke Hama	Motoki Funayama	Melancholy Tokyo (l. Tetsuya Chiaki; c. Masato Sugimoto; arr. Funayama)		
Mar 1980	Kiyari ni Okura rete	Michio Yamagami	Massaki Hirao	Kenichiro Morioka	Kitaguni no Hanafubuki (l. Yamagami; c. Hirao; arr. Funayama)		
1 Mar 1987	Otome no Love Game	Tsutomu Uozumi	Kōji Makaino		Anata, itte rasshai (l. Junko Takahata; c. Hiroyuki Nakagawa; arr. Hiroshi Takada)	Duet with Shigeru Yazaki	
11 Nov 1987	Otome no Hashigozake	Tsutomu Uozumi	Kōji Makaino		Otome no Love Game (l. Uozumi; c. arr. Makaino)	Duet with Tetsuya Takeda; 4th in Oricon chart	

=== Main albums ===
Date	Title	Side A	Side B
25 Nov 1976	Watashi no Shiki -Yoshimi Ashikawa Shunkashūtō-	Shiki no Uta; Sumidagawa; Midori Setsu Tera; Hanabi; Minazuki no Yoru; Otonashi Kawa	Momiji; Bon Kaeri; Yūgure Kōen; Yuki go mori; Kandagawa

== Filmography ==
=== Films ===
Year	Title	Role
1983	Dark Room	
1984	Kūkai	
1985	Furanzu rabu	
1988	Kizu	
1988	Nikutai no Mon	
1988	Yōjo Densetsu '88	
1989	Gokudō no Tsuma-tachi: Sandaimeane	Akiko
1990	Uchū no hōsoku	
1990	Otome Monogatari: Abunai Sixteen	
1991	Fukuzawa Yukichi	Okoto
1991	Ebarake no Hitobito	
1991	Jingi	
1992	Akutoku no Kunshō: Black Cop	
1993	Minbō no Teiō	Sayo Kadokawa
1994	Nostradamus Senritsu no Keiji	Elementary school teacher
1997	Hermes － Ai wa Kaze no Gotoku	Goddess of love
2000	Nagisa	Sumiko, Mami's mother
2004	1 Litre no Namida	Dorm mother Sato
2012	The Final Judgement	Hideko Washio
2016	Tenshi ni I'm Fine	Yoshino Hongo
2021	Beautiful Lure	

=== TV dramas ===
Run	Title	Role	Network	Production	Notes
1971	Sora ga konnani Aoi to wa		NHK		
1971	Gunbee Meyasubako	Yoshie	EX	Toei Company	Episode 24 "Umi o Watatte kita"
1972	Mirrorman	Aiko Yasuda	CX	Tsuburaya Productions	Episode 49 "Ikari o kome tako no Ichigeki"
1973	Fireman	Robot girl	NTV	Tsuburaya Productions	Episode 12 "Chikyū wa Robot no Hakaba"
1973	Kamen Rider V3	Misako Kawada	MBS	Toei	Episode 42 "Katatsumuri Ningen no Jintai Jikken!"
1975	Keirei! Sawayaka-san		EX		
1978	Ohana-chan Hanjō-ki		EX		
31 Jul 1978	Ōoka Echizen	Okumi	TBS	C.A.L	Part 5 Episode 26 "Meguro ni kieta kubō-sama"
1979	Mito Kōmon		TBS	C.A.L	Part 10 Episode 7 "Nise Kōmon-sama no Ōte-gara -Fukuroi-"
14 Sep 1981	Mito Kōmon	Omiyo	TBS	C.A.L	Part 12 Episode 3 "Kōmonsama no Nusutto Jingi -Fuchū-"
1981	Yami o Kire	Ohatsu	KTV	Shochiku	Episode 7 "Joshoku Danshoku Midare Sō"
1981	Keishichō Satsujin-ka		EX	Toei	Episode 23 "Roppongi-zoku Satsujin jiken Nazo no Onna Maria"
1982	Bungotori Monochō		EX	Mitsune Pro	Episode 14 "Benikanzashi no Kizuna"
1982	Ōedo Sōsamō	Oyō	TX	Van Phil G Company	Episode 536 "Maboroshi no Mayumi Gekijō ni Moeru Onna"
1982	Uwasa no Keiji Tommy to Matsu	Satomi	TBS	Daiei TV	2nd Series Episode 23 "TomiMatsu Kōfuku! Akutō Shi no Mizuzeme"
1982	Dokurokengyō: Akuryō Kyūketsuki Ōoku Renzoku Kaishi Jiken		CX		
1982	Roku-gatsu no Kiken na Hanayome		TBS	Daiei TV	
1982	The Hangman II	Postwoman	ABC	Shochiku Geino	Episode 27 "Gan Satsujin no Kyōfu!! Jintai Jikken no Onna o Sukue"
1982–83	Seishun...... Ings Yuko to Helen		KTV		
1983	Ōedo Sōsamō		TX	Van Phil G Company	Episode 604 "Zesshō! Namida ni Nureta Ominaeshi"
1983	Umontori Monochō		NTV	Union Motion Picture	Episode 15 "Denroku no Hatsukoi"
1983	Abarenbō Shōgun II	Okei	EX	Toei	Episode 33 "Tobe! Ashita ni Kadode no Cha no Kaori"
1983	Zenigata Heiji	Oyumi	CX	Toei	Episode 836 "Noroi no Shamisen"
1983	Machiko Hasegawa no ijiwaru Kangofu		CX		
1983	Shin Hangman	Satomi	ABC	Shochiku Geino	Episode 19 "Furō-sha o Osou Idai Kyōju to Uwaki Fujin"
1983	Jikenkisha Chabo		NTV	Union Motion Picture	Episode 8 "Chabo ga Tonakai de yattekita"
4 Oct 1984	Ōoka Echizen	Omiyo	TBS	C.A.L	Part 6 Episode 31 "Norowareta Endan"
1984	Ōedo Sōsamō	Onatsu	TX	Van Phil G Company	Episode 629 "Watashi o Tsuma ni! Jūzō Jonan Sōdō"
1984	Nonki-kun		CX		
1984	The Hangman 4	Eiko Katori	ABC	Shochiku Geino	Episode 12 "Tiger Cab no Honkyo ga Osowa reru!"
1984	Mokuyō Golden Drama Mashō		YTV		
1984	Hissatsu Shigoto Hito IV	Okyō	ABC	Shochiku	Episode 36 "Omomizu: Nagare Hoshi ni Negai o kakeru"
1984	Tokusō Saizensen		EX	Toei	Episodes 359 "Ai Dangan Ai: 7-ri no Keiji-tachi" and 360 "Ai Dangan Ai II: 7-ri no Keiji-tachi"
1985	Ijiwarubāsan		CX		
1985	Itazura Stewardess! Ojō-sama Ote yawarakani		CX		
1985	Tokusō Saizensen		EX	Toei	Episode 426 "Kaigai Tokuhain Satsujin Mystery!"
1985	Abare Kyūan	Okoyo	KTV	Toho	Episode 15 "Geta ga Otoshita Ai"
1985	Shitetsu Ensen 97 Bunsho	Kazuko Yamamura	EX	KHK	Episode 31 "Chakunin! Powerful Combi"
1985	Shadow Warriors	Okiri	KTV	Toei	Episode 2 "Kage naki onna ni o Yōjin"
1985	Egaka reta Onna		NTV	Mitsune Pro	
1985	Okunoto Satsujin Yūgi		NTV		
1985	Super Police	Eriko Shinjo	TBS	Toei	Episode 8 "Kurayami de Dokkiri Watashi wa Mita!"
1985	Getsuyō Wide Gekijō Tasogare Fujin II		EX	Nikkatsu Satsueijo	
1986	The Hangman V	Rie Saito, NMQ co-owner	ABC	Shochiku Geino	Episode 13 "Falcon ga Sensō Game no Hyōteki ni sa reru!"
1986	Hissatsu Shigoto Hito V Gekitō-hen	Orui	ABC	Shochiku	Episode 21 "Sen to ritsu, Yotte Abareru"
1986	Tokusō Saizensen		EX	Toei	Episode 470 "Satsujin Irai o suru Onna ano Hito o Koroshite...!"
1986	Taiyō ni Hoero!	Yoko Katsuragi	NTV	Toho	Episode 692 "Sōsa ni Te o Dasuna!"
1986	Ai no Arashi		THK		"Arashi ga Oka"
7, 14 Jul 1987	Seicho Matsumoto Special Watasareta Bamen	Keiko	NTV	Kiri Kikaku	
1987	Ai Densetsu		THK		
1987	Kaō Ai no Gekijō Yūwaku		TBS		Lead role
Jan 1988	Kyōto Shūzan Satsujin Kaidō Koto to Wakasa o Butai ni Ayashiku Kuruu Furin no Hitozuma		NTV	Shochiku	
Jun 1988	June Bride Mama		NTV	Shochiku	
1988	Drama 23 Namida Nikki		TBS		
1988	Wakaremichi		CBC		
1988	Mei Bugyō: Tōyama no Kin-san	Osayo	EX	Toei	1st Series Episode 20 "Bijin Shimai no Fukushū"
1988	Sasurai Keiji Ryojō-hen		EX	Toei	Episode 10 "Yamanotesen kara Yūkai sa reta Bijin OL"
1989	Abarenbō Shōgun III	Oshizu no Kata	EX	Toei	Episode 59 Spring Special "Michinoku Keppan-jō! Mashō no Tani no Kessen!!"
1989	Abarenbō Shōgun III	Okō / Hamaji (dual role)	EX	Toei	Episode 93 "Akuryō no Shiro no Hanayome"
Feb 1989	Abunai Deka	Shoko Tachibana	NTV	Central Arts	Episode 18 "Miwaku"
1989	Naokishō Sakka Suspense Rinka no Shinshitsu		KTV	Toei	
1989	Yukitsumo Doritsu Haru no Michi		TBS		
1989	Natsu no Arashi		THK		
1989	Tsukikagehyōgo abare Tabi	Oshima	TX		
1989	Hagure Keiji Junjōha	Miwako Torikai	EX	Toei	2nd Series Episode 17 "Manbiki o suru Bijo"
1989	Gendai Shinpi Suspense Mō hitotsu no Sekai		KTV	Toho	
1989	Kyoto Suspense Yūgao no Tera Satsujin Jiken		KTV	Shochiku Kyoto Movie	
1989	Mokuyō Gekijō / Sugishi Hi no Serenade		CX		
1989	Otome no Mystery Kuro no Shamen		CX		
1989	Ki Heitai		NTV		
1990	Abarenbō Shōgun III	Nui	EX	Toei	Episode 126 "Mitsumei! Edojō o Hōgeki Seyo!!"
6 Nov 1990	Seiichi Morimura no Kekkon Kabushikigaisha		NTV	Nihon Eizō	
1990	Kaseifu wa Mita! (8) Ginza Kyoto Kyoshoku to Yokubō ni Moeru Utsukushī Oyako no Adeyakana Himitsu		EX	Daiei TV	
1990	Happyakuyachō Yume Nikki	Tōriame no Okinu	NTV	Union Motion Picture	1st Series Episode 19 "Namidaame, Onna-reki"
1990	Getsuyō Onna no Suspense Toba Umi ni naku Onna		TX		
1990	The Keiji	Kyoko	EX	Toho	Episode 19 "Nozoka reta Kiken na Mikkai"
1991	Mito Kōmon	Oyuki	TBS	C.A.L	Part 20 Episode 16 "Otoko Ikuji no Hakatabushi -Fukuoka-"
1991	Mito Kōmon	Osode	TBS	C.A.L	Part 20 Episode 43 "Otoko Ijiki no Rien-jō -Ichinoseki-"
1991	Ōedo Sōsamō	Oryo	TX	Van Phil G Company	Episode 685 "Onna nezumi Kozō hiwa! Adauchi Sado Jōwa"
1991	Abarenbō Shōgun IV		EX	Toei	Episode 16 "Onna Shōkin Kasegi, Edo o Kiru"
9 Jul 1991	Zero Focus		NTV	Kindai Eiga Kyokai	
1991	Scandal o Oe!		TBS		
	Keiji Gan-san 2		TBS		
1991	Onihei Hankachō	Oyasu	CX	Shochiku	2nd Series Episode 14 "Yoru Kitsune"
1991	Depart! Natsu Monogatari		TBS	Daiei TV	
1991	Itsumoisshoni ite Hoshī		NTV		
1991	Wakarete no chi no Koiuta		NTV		
1991	Da-ma-shi		NTV		
1991	Jirochō Sangokushi	Oriha	TX		
1992	Mito Kōmon	Okayo	TBS	C.A.L	Part 21 Episode 9 "Mitsumei Obita Shinobizuma -Kitsuki-"
1992	Abarenbō Shōgun IV		EX	Toei	Episode 42 "Onna Shōkin Kasegi, Kozure Tabi!"
1992	Mei Bugyō: Tōyama no Kin-san	Oji	EX	Toei	4th Series Episode 21 "Jigoku kara Kaettekita Onna"
Jan 1992	Seiichi Morimura no Ikari no Jusei		NTV	Nihon Eizō	
1992	Happyakuyachō Yume Nikki	Ohisa	NTV	Union Motion Picture	2nd Series Episode 28 "Miyabura reta Jirokichi"
1992	Tenka no Fukushōgun Mito Mitsukuni Tokugawa Gosanke no Gekitō	Kikyo, Saki	TX		
1992	Moto Rōnin Burai Tabi II		EX	Toei	
1992	Tsuma-tachi no Gekijō Manatsu no Dekigoto		CX		
1992	Shogun Iemitsu Shinobi Tabi Part 2	Isuzu (Kiyohime)	EX	Toei	
12 Apr 1993	Ōoka Echizen	Shiori	TBS	C.A.L	Part 13 Episode 22 "Aka ni Obieru Onna"
1993	Mito Kōmon	Oshizuka	TBS	C.A.L	Part 22 Episode 31 "Yashichi wa Otto no Teki! -Shibata-"
1993	Abarenbō Shōgun V	Tachibana-ya Okon	EX	Toei	Episode 16 "Onna Jiken-ya, Edo o Kiru!"
1993	Mei Bugyō: Tōyama no Kin-san	Someka	EX	Toei	5th Series Episode 21 "Uragitta Akujo!"
1993	Tsuki Umaya oen Jikenchō	Okatsu	TX	Shochiku	2nd Series
1993	Tsuma-tachi no Gekijō Kiri no Mukō-gawa		CX		
1993	Tsuru Himedenki -Kōbō Setouchi Suigun-		NTV		
1994	Mito Kōmon	Kurenai Oren	TBS	C.A.L	Part 23 Episodes 1 to 11
27 Sep 1994	Chihō Kisha Yosuke Tachibana (4) Oume Okutama Tsūshin-kyoku		NTV	Kindai Eiga Kyokai	
1994	Mei Bugyō: Tōyama no Kin-san	Oyumi	EX	Toei	6th Series Episode 12 "Tsuiseki! Uragitta Onna"
1994	Edo o Kiru	Akane	TBS	C.A.L	Episodes 1 and 2 "Tōyamazakura ga Aku o Kiru"
1994	Yami no Kariudo	Nobuko	TX	Shochiku	
1994	Tsumiki kuzushi - Hōkai		TX		
1994	Hatchōbori Torimono-banashi		CX		Episode 10 "Okuribi"
1994	Edo no Yōjinbō	Chiyokichi	NTV		1st Series Episode 8 "Sei-san, Jonan no Sō ari"
1994	Stewardess no Koibito		TBS		
1995	Abarenbō Shōgun VI	Ofuku	EX	Toei	Episode 22 "Shikkari Nyōbō, Kōsan suru"
1995	Abarenbō Shōgun VI	Yashamen no Ogin	EX	Toei	Episode 33 "Onna Shōkin Kasegi Shura no Hanamichi!"
1995	Shōkyōto Mystery 14	Ayako Sano	NTV		
1995	Hagure Keiji Junjōha		EX	Toei	8th Series Episode 24 "Shisha kara no Tegami! Yōkina Mibōjin"
1995	Tsuki Umaya oen Jikenchō'	Okatsu	TX		3rd Series
1995	Taiga drama Hachidai Shōgun Yoshimune	Someko (Yoshiyasu Sokushitsu)	NHK		
1995	Natsu! Depart Monogatari		TBS	Daiei TV	
1995	Zenigata Heiji	Osayo	CX	Toei	5th Series Episode 3 "Shinya no Kokuhaku"
1995	Obasan Deka: Sakura Otome no Jiken Jō 2	Nobue Yasuhara	CX		
1996	Mito Kōmon	Okayo	TBS	C.A.L	Part 24 Episode 17 "Onna Meakashi Adauchi Higan -Ogura-"
1998	Oshigoto desu!		CX		
1998	Owari Bakumatsu Fūun-roku: Ishin o Ugokashita Otoko Tokugawa Yoshikatsu		TX		
1998	Shin Udenioboeari: Yorozuya Heishirōkatsujinken	Omō	NHK		Episode 8 "Nusumu Kodomo"
1999	Kyoto Maru Hishiokichō		ABC	Shochiku	
1999	Tantei Susumu Samonji (1) Fūin sa reta Satsujin		TBS		
2000	Kansatsu-i Zenjiro Yabuno (8) Shitai wa Shitte iru		TBS		
2000	Drama D Mode Fukaku Kakure: Hakkenden 2001		NHK		
2000	Eien no 1/2		TBS		
2001	Abarenbō Shōgun XI	Ayao Mita	EX	Toei	Episode 4 "Joi no Koi shita Machibugyō"
22 May 2001	Chihō Kisha Yosuke Tachibana (17) Etchū Takaoka Tsūshin-kyoku		NTV	Kindai Eiga Kyokai	
2001	Kansatsu-i Zenjiro Yabuno (9) Shitai wa Shitte iru'		TBS		
2001	Ōedo o Kakeru!	Tsuruji	TBS	C.A.L	Episode 9 "Hi Ken! Yami no Tachi"
2002	Mito Kōmon	Okon	TBS	C.A.L	Part 30 Episode 9 "Musume ga Shitta Chichi no Himitsu -Kubota-"
2002	Hagure Keiji Junjōha	Tomoko Mayama	EX	Toei	
2002	Obasan Deka: Sakura Otome no Jiken Jō 11	Shoko Yamauchi	CX		
2002	Monta Mino no Jinsei Sōdan Deka: Omoikkiriterebi Satsujin Jiken		NTV		
2003	Mito Kōmon	Otose	TBS	C.A.L	Part 23 Episode 14 "Naniwa Musume no Hahakoi Itchokusen -Nihonmatsu-"
2003	Shinshun Tokuban Bengoshi Ayuko Takabayashi Special		NTV	Toei	
2003	Ryokō Sakka Chayajirō (3) Shimantogawa Satsujin Jiken		BS Japan, TX		
2003	Getsuyō Mystery Gekijō Yonaoshi Kōmuin: The! Kōshōjin		TBS		
2004	Hagure Keiji Junjōha		EX	Toei	17th Series Episode 5 "Tsuma ga Mita Sankaku Kankei! Karasu no Nyōbō Satsujin Jiken!"
2004	Kaseifu wa Mita! (23) Masayoshi-ha Bengoshi Oshidorifūfu ni Shōgeki no Himitsu ga...		EX	Daiei TV	
2004	Tokusō Keiji Reiko Toyama (2) Oyako Kantei Satsujin Jiken		BS Japan, TX		
2005	Engine		CX		
2006	Obasan Kaichō Murasaki no Hanzai Seisō Nikki Gomi wa Koroshi o Shitte iru Series		TBS		
2007	Yorozuya Heishirōkatsujinken		TX		Episode 7 "Ukikusa no Onna"
2007	Moto Rōnin Tsukikagehyōgo	Omine	EX	Toei	Episode 3 "Otto no Kyū wa Ikiteita Moto Rōnin to Namida no Ippikiōkami"
2007	Nōka no Yome wa Bengoshi! Junko Kamiya no Furusato Jiken-bo		TX		
2007	Hōtei Arashi Bengoshi Igari Bunsuke		TX		
2008	Tokugawa Fūunroku Hachidai Shōgun Yoshimune		TX		
2008	Geisha Koharu Nēsan Funtō-ki		TX		
2008	Sōsa Kenji Shigemichi Chikamatsu (8) Ise Shima Ama Densetsu Satsujin Jiken		TX		
2008	Doctor Koishi no Jiken Karute		CX		
2008	Mitsuhiko Asami Series (32) Hakoniwa		CX		
2009	Mito Kōmon	Fumi	TBS	C.A.L	Part 39 Episode 16 "Haha to Nanorenu Kako Kanashi -Usuki-"
2009	Hissatsu Shigoto Hito 2009	Nui	ABC	Shochiku	Episode 20 "Onna no Ichibu"
5 Jan 2009	Kyotaro Nishimura Suspense Tantei Susumu Samonji		TBS		
21 Feb 2009	Senryoku Gaitsūkoku		Wowow		
3 Apr 2009	Okusama wa Keishisōkan		CX		
12 Dec 2009	Sono Otoko, Fuku Shochō		EX	Toei	3rd Series File.5
15 Feb 2010	Yorozuya Chōbee no Sumidagawa Jiken File 2		TBS		
14 Jun 2010	Reiko Kamijo no Jiken Suiri 7	Kyoko Furuya	TBS		
19 Nov 2010	Yasuo Uchida Mystery Yufuin Satsujin Jiken		CX		
10 Dec 2010	Bengoshi Riyako Asabuki		CX		
30 May 2011	Hanchō: Jinnan-sho Asaka Han Series 4: Seigi no Daishō	Yoshimi Hayashida	TBS		Episode 8
25 Aug 2011	Kyoto Chiken no Onna	Masako Ando	EX	Toei	7th Series Episode 6
20 Aug 2012	Sangaku Keiji Nihon Hyakumeizan Satsujin Jiken	Wakana Tanimura	TBS		
2014	Kenji Yoko Asahina (15) Soba o Tabetara 3 Oku-en!? Zaisan Nerai no Tsumatachi o Osou Himawari Hakka Trick!!	Michiyo Takiguchi	EX	Toei	
10 Jan 2014	Ōoka Echizen	Ogin	NHK BS Premium	C.A.L	Episode 7 "Keika no Shisenryō"
13 Jan 2014	Totsukawa Keibu Series 51	Aki Hanamura	TBS		
2014	Kiraware Kansatsu-kan Otonashi Ichi Roku: Keisatsu Naibu Chōsa no Oni	Mitsue Okazaki	TX		
5 Feb 2014	Aibō	Katsuko Kodama	EX	Toei	Season 12 Episode 14 "Kao"
2015	Tetsudō Sōsa-kan (15) Shi o Yobu Sketch Ryokō!? Shūchakueki de Enjō suru Meiga no Nazo!!	Kumi Yamai	EX	ViViA	
2016	Sotai Soshiki Hanzai Taisaku-ka	Sachiko Tamura	TX		
2 Jan 2016	Shinshun Jidaigeki Nobunaga Moyu	Tanba no Kyoku	TX	Toei	
18 Aug 2016	Onna-tachi no Tokusō Saizensen	Hanayo Yasuda	EX	Toei	Episode 5

=== Stage ===
Date	Title	Notes
	Black Comedy	
	Edo o Kiru	
	Chūshingura	
	Nemuri Kyoshirō	
	Kōtarō Satomi Tokubetsu Kōen Kutsukake Tokijirō / Momi no Ki wa Nokotta	
	Dorobō to Wakatono	
Nov 2009, Mar 2010	Saburō Kitajima Tokubetsu Kōen Kiso Koi shigure	Located in Hakata-za and Misono-za
May 2010	Joyū	Starring Mariko Okada

=== Other TV programmes ===
Run	Title	Network	Notes
Apr 1979 – Mar 1980	Hiroshi Ogawa Show	CX	9th generation assistant
	Kakkurakin Dai Hōsō	NTV	
	Gogo wa Marumaru Omoikkiri TV	NTV	Occasional appearances
	Tokado shopping channel		Occasional appearances

=== Radio ===
Run	Title	Network	Notes
1980	Shōfukutei Tsurukō no All Night Nippon	NBS	10th generation assistant
6 Oct 1991 – Apr 1994	Tenshi no Morning Call	JFN, NRN	

=== Advertisements ===
Company	Product
Takeda Pharmaceutical Company Limited	Takeda Gastrointestinal Drug 21
Hakusui Inc.	High Sour
