= Shichiji ni aimashō =

1963 Japanese TV series

- DVD cover
- Starring: Kyu Sakamoto; Shincho Kokontei; Rokusuke Ei
- Original language: Japanese

Production
- Running time: 27 minutes

Original release
- Release: 8 June 1963

Shichiji ni aimashō (7時にあいまショー) was a Japanese musical variety television program broadcast by TBS from 7 p.m. to 7:30 p.m, from 7 April 1962 until 28 September 1963.

The title means "Let's meet at 7 o'clock", with a minor play on words as the final shō not only sounds like the Japanese word for "show" but also is written as if were the latter word.

In one of the episodes, broadcast on 8 June 1963, the singer Kyu Sakamoto sings eight of his better-known songs. The short music videos were recorded in a studio in Tokyo by TBS; the sets are a small traditional Japanese town, a barrel storage and an alley. The songs are performed in the following order:

1. Good Timing
2. Goodbye Joe
3. Tsun tsun bushi
4. [narration]
5. Ue o muite arukō [marketed in English-speaking countries as "Sukiyaki"]
6. [narration]
7. Anoko no namae wa nantenkana
8. [narration]
9. Kiminanka Kiminanka
10. [narration]
11. Benkyō no cha cha
12. [discussion between interviewer and Rokusuke Ei]
13. Miagetegoran Yoru no hoshi o
