= Miagete Goran Yoru no Hoshi o =

Single by Kyu Sakamoto
- Language: Japanese
- English title: "Look Up at the Stars at Night"
- B-side: "Benkyo no cha cha cha"
- Released: 1963 (Japan), 1963 (WW), 1986 (WW) (Re-release)
- Genre: J-pop, Pop
- Length: 3:10
- Label: Toshiba-EMI
- Composer: Taku Izumi
- Lyricist: Rokusuke Ei

"Miagete Goran Yoru no Hoshi o" (見上げてごらん夜の星を; "Look up at the stars in the night") is a 1963 hit song performed by Japanese singer Kyu Sakamoto. It was written by lyricist Rokusuke Ei and composer Taku Izumi. Izumi won the composer award at the 5th Japan Record Awards. The song was originally written for a musical of the same title in 1960, and the 1963 movie starring Sakamoto.

== History ==
Miagete Goran Yoru no Hoshi o was originally written as the theme song for the 1960 musical of the same name, with lyrics by Rokusuke Ei and music by Taku Izumi, A movie based on this musical, was released in 1963, starring singer Kyu Sakamoto, who performed the song for it.

The song was first performed by Motomichi Ito in the 1960 musical, becoming a hit after it was performed by Sakamoto.

There have been many covers of the song, including Ken Hirai's version in his 2003 acoustic cover album 'Ken's Bar', which used the latest technology of the time, combining his appearance with the original footage by Kyu Sakamoto. This duet appeared at that year's NHK Kouhaku Uta Gassen.

The song has also been used as a commercial jingle, movie insert song, and a musical road.

== Versions ==
This song was covered by many singers, including Begin (as an end theme for the anime Futatsu no Spica) and Ken Hirai. It was covered by noise rock band Ground Zero for their 1997 album Plays Standards.

The song, among other cheerful songs of Kyu Sakamoto, was often heard in Japan after the 2011 Tōhoku earthquake and tsunami. This included a series of versions by 71 actors and singers (among which was Tommy Lee Jones), for Suntory beverage company commercials, coupled with the song "Ue o Muite Arukō". Shikao Suga also covered the song for charity.

== See also ==
- Melody Road, the pavement rendition of this song
