= Natsu ni Koisuru Onnatachi =

- Genre: Drama
- Starring: Masakazu Tamura; Yoshio Harada; Yūko Natori; Michiyo Azusa; Masahiko Tsugawa
- Opening theme: "Natsu ni Koisuru Onnatachi" by Taeko Ohnuki
- Country of origin: Japan
- Original language: Japanese
- No. of episodes: 9

Original release
- Network: TBS
- Release: August 5 – September 30, 1983

Related
- Fuzoroi no Ringotachi; Mō Ichido Kekkon

Natsu ni Koisuru Onnatachi (夏に恋する女たち) is a Japanese television drama series that aired on TBS in 1983.

== Cast ==
- Masakazu Tamura as Mitsuo Kurahashi
- Yoshio Harada as Daisuke Mizushima
- Yūko Natori as Yoko Asami
- Michiyo Azusa as Sanae Aoyama
- Jun Miho as Mitsu
- Hisako Manda as Ritsuko Kaga
- Masahiko Tsugawa as Hideki Kamisaka
