= 5th Japan Record Awards =

1963 Japanese music awards ceremony

- Date: 27 December 1963
- Venue: Hibiya Public Hall
- Website: http://www.jacompa.or.jp/reco5.html

The 5th Japan Record Awards were held on 27 December 1963. Michiyo Azusa was the first female solo singer to win the JRA.

== Emcee ==
Takayuki Akutagawa

- 4th time as the emcee of JRA.

== Award winners ==
Japan Record Award

- Michiyo Azusa for "Konnichiwa Aka Chan"
  - Lyricist: Rokusuke Ei
  - Composer: Hachidai Nakamura
  - Arranger: Hachidai Nakamura
  - Record Company: King Records

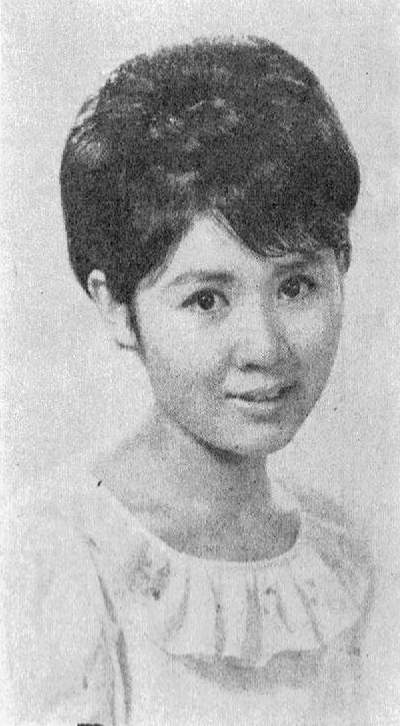
Michiyo Azusa, Japan Record Award awarder.

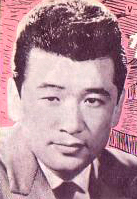
Frank Nagai, awarded Vocalist Award again after 4 years, and JRA 2 years ago.

Vocalist Award

- Frank Nagai for "Aka Chan Wa Osamada"
  - Awarded again after 4 years, 2nd vocalist award.

New Artist Award

- Kazuo Funaki for "Koukou San Nen Sei" and "Gakuen Hiroba"
- Akemi Misawa for "Shima No Blues" and "Watashi Wa Nagare No Watari Tori"

Composer Award

- Taku Izumi for "Miagete Goran Yoru No Hoshi O"
  - Singer: Kyu Sakamoto

Arranger Award

- Hiroshi Miyagawa for "Koi No Vacance"
  - Singer: The Peanuts

Lyricist Award

- Toshio Oka for "Koukou San Nen Sei"
  - Singer: Kazuo Funaki

Planning Award

- Nippon Columbia for "Nihon No Minyo"
  - Awarded after 2 years, 3rd planning award.

Children's Song Award

- Yoshiko Mari for "Omocha No Chachacha"

== Nominations ==
=== JRA ===
Song	Singer	Votes
Konnichiwa Aka Chan	Michiyo Azusa	19
Koukou San Nen Sei	Kazuo Funaki	Not mentioned.
Miagete Goran Yoru No Hoshi O	Kyu Sakamoto	Not mentioned.
Koi No Vacance	The Peanuts	Not mentioned.
Shima No Blues	Akemi Misawa	Not mentioned.
Aitakute	Frank Nagai	Not mentioned.
Gakuen Hiroba	Kazuo Funaki	Alternative Nominations
Erica No Hana Chiru Toki	Sachiko Nishida	Alternative Nominations
Shima Sodachi	Yoshio Tabata	Alternative Nominations

=== Children's song award ===
Song	Singer	Votes
Omocha No Chachacha	Yoshiko Mari	Not mentioned but won in a small margin.
Aka Chan Wa Osamada	Frank Nagai	Not mentioned but won in a small margin.
Kazehiki Zousan	Satoko Koga	Not mentioned but won in a small margin.

== See also ==
- 1963 in Japanese music
