= Japan Composer's Association =

The Japan Composer's Association, or JACOMPA (日本作曲家協会 in Japanese) is an organization of Japanese composers, established in 1959. Among its members are some of Japan's most renowned composers of contemporary classical music.

== Presidents ==
- Masao Koga (1958–1978)
- Ryoichi Hattori (1978–1993)
- Tadashi Yoshida (1993–1997)
- Toru Funamura (1997–2005)
- Minoru Endo (2005–2008)
- Takashi Miki (2008–2009)
- Katsuhisa Hattori (2009–2013)
- Gendai Kano (2013–present)

== See also ==
- Japan Record Award
