= 18th Japan Record Awards =

1976 Japanese music awards ceremony

- Date: 31 December 1976
- Venue: Imperial Garden Theater, Tokyo
- Hosted by: Keizo Takahashi

Television/radio coverage
- Network: TBS

The 18th Annual Japan Record Awards took place at the Imperial Garden Theater in Chiyoda, Tokyo, on 31 December 1976, starting at 7:00PM JST. The primary ceremonies were televised in Japan on TBS.

The audience rating was 41.9%.

== Winners ==
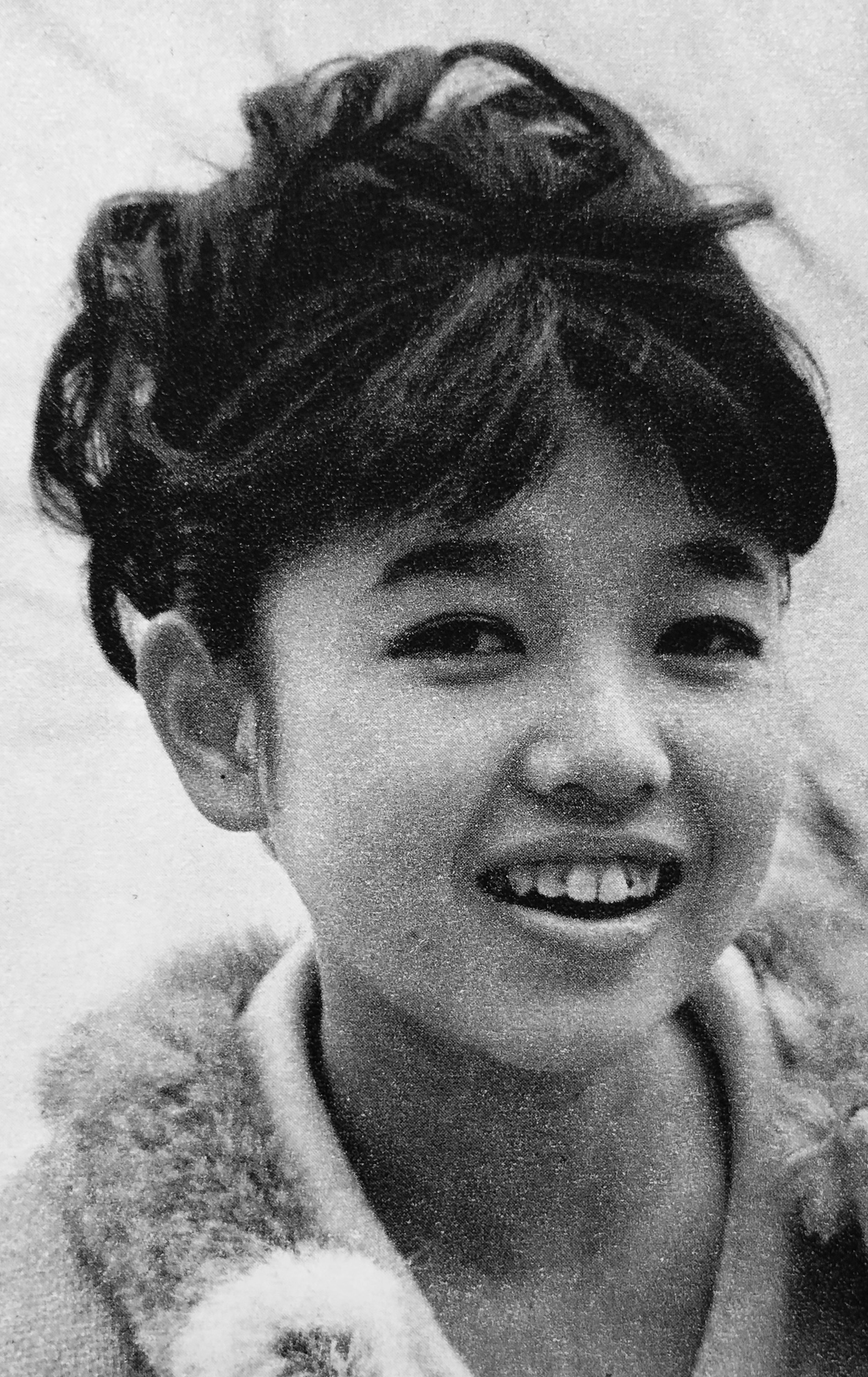
Miyako Harumi, JRA winner, awarded again after awarded new artist award 12 years ago.

=== Japan Record Award ===
Harumi Miyako – "Kita no Yadokara"

- Lyricist: Yū Aku
- Composer: Asei Kobayashi
- Arranger: Jiro Takemura
- Record Company: Nippon Columbia

=== Best Vocalist ===
Aki Yashiro for "Mou Ichido Aitai"

=== Best New Artist ===
Yasuko Naito for "Omoide Boroboro"

=== Singing Award ===
- Naoko Ken for "Abayo"
- Goro Noguchi for "Shinyouju"
  - Awarded again after last year, 2nd vocalist award.
- Hideki Saijo – "Wakaki Shishi Tachi"
  - Awarded again after last year, 3rd vocalist award.

=== General Public Award ===
Hiromi Go for "Anata ga Itakara Boku ga Ita" and other songs.

=== New Artist Award ===
- Yoshimi Ashikawa for "Yuki Go Mori"
- Hiroshi Kadokawa for "Uso Demo Ii No"
- Kenji Niinuma for "Yome Ni Konai Ka"
- Pink Lady for "Pepper Keibu"

=== Composer Award ===
Ryudo Uzaki for "Omoide Boroboro"

- Singer: Yasuko Naitō

=== Arranger Award ===
Mitsuo Hagita for "Melancholy"

- Singer: Michiyo Azusa

=== Lyricist Award ===
Yoko Aki for "Yokosuka Story"

- Singer: Momoe Yamaguchi

=== Special Award ===
- Hibari Misora
- Dark Ducks

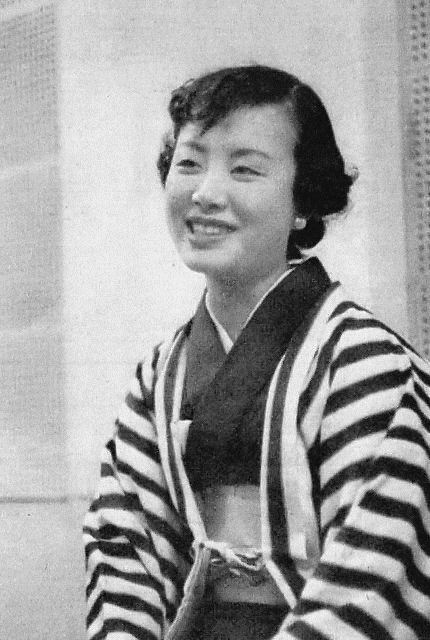
Hibari Misora, special award winner.

== Nominations ==
=== Best 10 JRA Nominations ===
Song	Singer	Award	Votes
Yokosuka Story	Momoe Yamaguchi	N/A	N/A
Wakaki Shishi Tachi	Hideki Saijo	Vocalist Award	Not Mentioned
Abayo	Naoko Ken	Vocalist Award	Not Mentioned
Sazanka	Shinichi Mori	N/A	N/A
Kita No Yado Kara	Harumi Miyako	Japan Record Award	45 (47 for another source)
Koi Hitotsu Yukigeshiki	Masako Mori	N/A	N/A
Mou Ichido Aitai	Aki Yashiro	Best Vocalist	Not Mentioned
Ochiba Ga Yuki Ni	Akira Fuse	N/A	N/A
Melancholy	Michiyo Azusa	N/A	N/A
Shinyouju	Goro Noguchi	Vocalist Award	Not Mentioned

=== New Artist ===
Song	Singer	Votes (1st Round)	Votes (5th New Artist Award)
Omoide Boroboro	Yasuko Naitou	45	N/A
Pepper Keibu	Pink Lady	36	N/A
Yuki Gomori	Yoshimi Ashikawa	31	N/A
Uso Demoiino	Hiroshi Kadokawa	31	N/A
Yome Ni Konaika	Kenji Niinuma	27	27
(Not Mentioned)	Mari Yoshida	27	20
Shiroi Scarf	Noboru Asada	15	Not Mentioned
Tsugaru Tsuaa	Akiko Yano	8	Not Mentioned

=== General Public Award ===
Candidate Singers
Hiromi Go
Candies
Masatoshi Nakamura
Yuriko Futaba
Yūzō Kayama

=== Lyricist Award ===
Lyricist	Votes
Yoko Aki	28
Yumi Matsutoya	8
Miyuki Nakajima	5
Yū Aku	4
Ranbou Minami	2

=== Composer Award ===
Song	Votes (1st Round)	Votes (Final Round)
Ryudo Uzaki	20	26
Takashi Miki	15	21
Asei Kobayashi	8	N/A
Masamitsu Tayama	3	N/A
Juichi Sase	1	N/A

=== Arranger Award ===
Arranger	Votes (1st Round)	Votes (Final Round)
Masataka Matsutoya	12	23
Mitsuo Hagita	12	24
Jirou Takemura	10	N/A
Katsuhisa Hattori	9	N/A
Ichizou Seo	4	N/A

=== Planning Award ===
Song	Votes
Isuzu Yamada Wo Kiku	30
Warena No Tenor: Yoshie Fujiwara Zenshuu	26
Masato Shimon's Oyoge! Taiyaki-kun	24
DOWN TOWN BOOGIE WOOGIE BAND's G.S	8
Yukiyo Toake's Tsukuda Hayashi 〜 Wasurekakete Ita Shitamachi No Kokoro 〜	5
Dark Ducks' Chichi To Musume	0

=== Special Award ===
Singer	Votes
Hibari Misora	All
Dark Ducks	All

== See also ==
- 1976 in Japanese music
