= Michiyo Azusa =

Japanese singer and actress (1943–2020)

- 梓みちよ
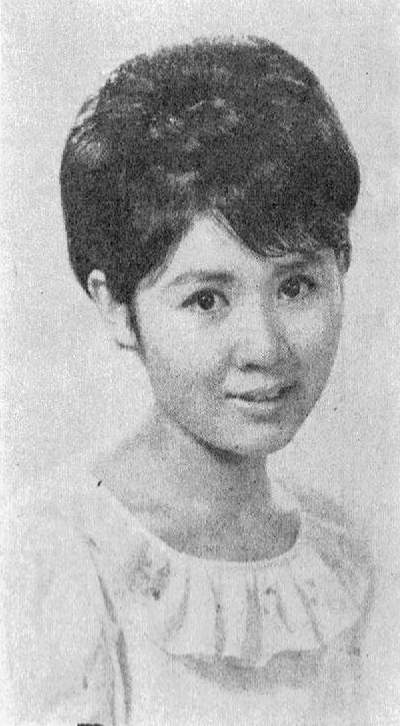
- Michiyo Azusa in November 1962
- Born: Michiyo Azusa; June 4, 1943; Fukuoka, Japan
- Died: January 29, 2020 (aged 76); Tokyo, Japan
- Occupations: Actor and singer
- Years active: 1963–1992
- Spouse: Kōji Wada

Michiyo Azusa (Japanese: 梓みちよ) (4 May 1943 - 29 January 2020) was the stage name of Michiyo Hayashi (林美千代), a Japanese singer and actress known for her 1963 song Konichiwa Akachan, or Hello Baby. Born in Fukuoka, Hayashi trained at the Takarazuka Music School, adopting her stage name when she started her singing career. As well as hits like Konichiwa Akachan, Futari De Osake Wo and Merankorī, she performed in a number of musical films, including Dorufutzzau desu yu! Zen'in Totsugeki of 1969, and continued to produce music into the 1990s, performing Konichiwa Akachan at the 1992 Kōhaku Uta Gassen. Her music spanned a wide range of styles from tango to J-pop.

== Career ==
Michiyo Hayashi was born in Fukuoka on the island of Kyushu in Japan on 4 May 1943. She went to Takarazuka Music School and from there joined Watanabe Productions, adopting the stage name Michiyo Azusa. In 1963, Azusa released Konnichiwa Akachan,(こんにちは赤ちゃん/梓みちよ第二集), also known in English as Hello Baby. With lyrics by Rokusuke Ei and music composed by Hachidai Nakamura, It won the 5th Japan Record Awards in 1963. She continued to release music for the next thirty years, using a wide range of genres, including tango and J-pop. Having had a hiatus lasting ten years, there was surprise in the music press when her 1974 song Futari De Osake Wo (二人でお酒を) in English Let's Drink Sake Together, won a Popular Music Award at the 16th Japan Record Awards. Two years later, her song Merankorī (メランコリー), composed by Takuro Yoshida, won Best Arrangement at the 18th Japan Record Awards.

In addition to singing, Azusa also acted, appearing in musical films and on television. For example, she starred in Shūe Matsubayashi's 1964 film A Little Matchmaker, which appeared in Japan under the same name as Azusa's famous hit, Konnichiwa Akachan. In 1983, she appeared in the Japanese television drama Natsu ni Koisuru Onnatachi. She was a frequent guest on Kōhaku Uta Gassen, appearing for the eleventh time in 1992, at which she sang Konnichiwa Akachan in honour of the composer, who had died that year.

== Family life ==
Azusa married the actor Kōji Wada in April 1972. However, their marriage did not last, due to Wada's infidelity, financial difficulties and strained relationships between Azusa and Wada's family. They announced their divorce after one year and seven months on 4 October 1973. Azuza remained unmarried. She died of a heart attack aged 76 on 29 January 2020 at home in Tokyo and was posthumously awarded the Lifetime Achievement Award at the 62nd Japan Record Awards.

== Discography ==
=== Singles ===
Singles released under Azusa's name included:

- 1962 Bossa Noba de kissu / Yukidori Koi (ボッサ・ノバでキッス/恋のゆきどまり).
- 1976 Merankorī / yukidoke (メランコリー/雪どけ).

=== Studio albums ===
Azusa Michiyo performed in many albums including:

- 1963 Azusa Michiyo Dai-Isshuu (梓みちよ第一集).
- 1964 Konnichiwa Akachan/Azusa Michiyo Dai-Nishuu (こんにちは赤ちゃん/梓みちよ第二集).
- 1964 My Couple (Azusa Michiyo)|My Couple (マイ・カップル).
- 1964 Oka-san/Michyo no Hit Parade Vol.3 (おかあさん/みちよのヒットパレードVol.3)
- 1964 Futari wa Steady/My Couple Vol.2 (二人はステディー/マイ・カップルVol.2)
- 1965 Michiyo to Utaou/Azusa Michiyo no Jojo kashuu (みちよと歌おう/梓みちよの抒情歌集).
- 1970 Taishoku Negai —Natsuko no Kekkon— (退職願い —ナツコの結婚—).
- 1974 Futari De Osake Wo (二人でお酒を).
- 1976 Merankorī (メランコリー).
- 1979 Onna ga otoko wo kataru toki (女が男を語るとき).

=== Greatest Hits Albums ===
Azusa has appeared in a number of compilation albums including:

- 1976 Melancholy "Golden Star Album" (メランコリー 「ゴールデン・スター・ベスト・アルバム」).

=== Live Albums ===
Live performances that were produced as albums included:

- 1972 Azusa Michiyo On Stage (梓みちよ オン・ステージ)
- 1975 Azusa Michiyo Recital (梓みちよ・リサイタル)

== Filmography ==
Azusa starred in musical films including:

- 1964 A Little Matchmaker or Konnichiwa Akachan (こんにちは赤ちゃん).
- 1969 Let's Go Drifters or Dorufutzzau desu yu! Zen'in Totsugeki (ドルフｔっザウ です 油！ 全員 突撃).

== Awarded Songs ==
Year	Award	Song	Category
1963 (Showa 38)	5th Japan Record Awards	Konnichiwa Akachan	Japan Record Award
1967 (Showa 42)	9th Japan Record Awards	Nagisa No Signorina	Composer Award
1974 (Showa 49)	16th Japan Record Awards	Futari De Osake Wo	General Public Award
1976 (Showa 51)	18th Japan Record Awards	Melancholy	Arranger Award
2020 (Reiwa 2)	62nd Japan Record Awards	-	Lifetime Achievement Award
