= 62nd Japan Record Awards =

2020 Japanese music awards ceremony

- Date: 30 December 2020
- Location: New National Theatre Tokyo
- Hosted by: Riho Yoshioka; Shinichiro Azumi

Television/radio coverage
- Network: TBS

The 62nd Japan Record Awards (第62回日本レコード大賞, Dai Rokujū Ni-kai Nihon Rekōdo Taishō) was held on 30 December 2020.

Due to the COVID-19 pandemic, the Best Album Award, Songwriting Award, Composition Award, Merit Award, and Planning Award were not presented.

== Presenters ==
- Riho Yoshioka
- Shinichiro Azumi (TBS Announcer)

== Winners ==
=== Grand Prix ===
- LiSA – "Homura" (炎; "Flame")
  - Artist: LiSA
  - Lyrics: LiSA, Yuki Kajiura
  - Composition & arranger: Yuki Kajiura
  - Producer: Yuki Kajiura

=== Excellent Work Awards ===
- Daichi Miura – "I'm Here"
- Junretsu – "Ai wo Kudasai ~Don’t you cry~"
- Little Glee Monster - "Ashiato"
- Nogizaka46 – "Sekaijū no Rinjin yo"
- DISH// - "Neko ~The First Take Ver.~"
- AKB48 - "Hanarete Ite mo"
- Kiyoshi Hikawa – "Haha"
- Da Pump - "Fantasista"
- LiSA - "Homura"

=== Best New Artist ===
- Naoki Sanada

=== New Artist Awards ===
- Naoki Sanada
- Novelbright
- Mameshiba no Taigun
- Rin-ne

=== Best Vocal Performance ===
- Kōhei Fukuda

=== Special Achievement Award ===
- Uru
- Demon Slayer: Kimetsu no Yaiba
- NiziU
- Seiko Matsuda
- Kenshi Yonezu

=== Special Lifetime Achievement Award ===
- Michiyo Azusa
- Shingo Kobayashi
- Jackey Yoshikawa
- Kyōhei Tsutsumi
- Katsuhisa Hattori
- Mieko Hirota
- Toshiaki Maeda
- Masahito Maruyama

=== Special International Music Award ===
- BTS

=== Special Honor Award ===
- Arashi
