= 41st Japan Record Awards =

1999 Japanese music awards ceremony

- Date: 31 December 1999
- Venue: TBS A-Studio, Tokyo
- Hosted by: Masaaki Sakai, Hitomi Kuroki

Television/radio coverage
- Network: TBS

The 41st Annual Japan Record Awards took place on 31 December 1999, starting at 6:30PM JST. The primary ceremonies were televised in Japan on TBS.

== Award winners ==
- Japan Record Award:
  - Glay for "Winter, Again"
- Best Vocalist:
  - Hiromi Go
- Best New Artist:
  - Amika Hattan
- Best Album:
  - Hikaru Utada for First Love
- Asian Music Award
  - Faye Wong
- Special Award:
  - Okasan to Issho for "Dango 3 Kyodai"

== See also ==
- 50th NHK Kōhaku Uta Gassen
