= Goro Noguchi =

Japanese singer and actor

Goro Noguchi (野口 五郎, Noguchi Gorō, born 23 February 1956 in Mino, Gifu) is a Japanese singer and actor. His real name is Yasushi Sato (佐藤 靖, Satō Yasushi). He debuted as a singer in 1971 and earned a spot on the Kohaku Utagassen in 1972 with his second single, "Aoi Ringo". He got his first number-one hit with "Amai Seikatsu" in 1974, and his second one with his next single, "Shitetsu Ensen" in 1975.
