= 37th Japan Record Awards =

1995 Japanese music awards ceremony

- Date: 31 December 1995

Television/radio coverage
- Network: TBS

The 37th Annual Japan Record Awards took place on 31 December 1995, starting at 6:30PM JST. The primary ceremonies were televised in Japan on TBS.

== Award winners ==
- Japan Record Award:
  - Tetsuya Komuro (producer) & trf for "Overnight Sensation"
- Best Vocalist:
  - Joji Yamamoto
- Best New Artist:
  - Junko Miyama
