= 35th Japan Record Awards =

1993 Japanese music awards ceremony

- Date: 31 December 1993
- Venue: Nippon Budokan, Tokyo
- Hosted by: Amon Miyamoto, Riho Makise

Television/radio coverage
- Network: TBS

The 35th Annual Japan Record Awards took place at the Nippon Budokan in Chiyoda, Tokyo, 31 December 1993, starting at 6:30PM JST. The primary ceremonies were televised in Japan on TBS.

== Award winners ==
- Japan Record Award:
  - Kaori Kozai for "Mugonzaka"
- Best Vocalist:
  - Kiyoshi Maekawa
- Best New Artist:
  - Yasuhiro Yamane
- Best Album:
  - Mariya Takeuchi for "Quiet Life"
