= 45th Japan Record Awards =

2003 Japanese music awards ceremony

- Date: 31 December 2003
- Venue: TBS B-Studio, Tokyo
- Hosted by: Masaaki Sakai

Television/radio coverage
- Network: TBS

The 45th Annual Japan Record Awards took place on 31 December 2003, starting at 6:00PM JST. The primary ceremonies were televised in Japan on TBS.

== Award winners ==
- Japan Record Award:
  - Max Matsuura (producer), BOUNCEBACK (composer) & Ayumi Hamasaki (songwriter, singer) for "No way to say"
- Best Vocalist:
  - Kiyoshi Hikawa
- Best New Artist:
  - Yo Hitoto
