= 21st Japan Record Awards =

1979 Japanese music awards ceremony

- Date: 31 December 1979
- Venue: Imperial Garden Theater, Tokyo
- Hosted by: Keizo Takahashi

Television/radio coverage
- Network: TBS

The 21st Annual Japan Record Awards took place at the Imperial Garden Theater in Chiyoda, Tokyo, on 31 December 1979, starting at 7:00PM JST. The primary ceremonies were televised in Japan on TBS.

The audience rating was 43.3%.

== Award winners ==
=== Japan Record Award ===
- Judy Ongg for "Miserarete"
  - Lyricist: Yoko Aki
  - Composer: Kyōhei Tsutsumi
  - Arranger: Kyōhei Tsutsumi
  - Record Company: CBS Sony Records

== Best Vocalist ==
- Sachiko Kobayashi for "Omoide Zake"

== Best New Artist ==
- Tomoko Kuwae for "Watashi No Heart Wa Stopmotion"

== See also ==
- 1979 in Japanese music
