= 9th Japan Record Awards =

1967 Japanese music awards ceremony

- Date: 16 December 1967
- Venue: Shibuya Public Hall

Television/radio coverage
- Network: TBS

The 9th Annual Japan Record Awards took place at the Shibuya Public Hall in Shibuya, Tokyo, on 16 December 1967, starting at 2:30PM JST. Jackey Yoshikawa and His Blue Comets become the first group sounds that receive the JRA.

== Emcee ==
- Ayurou Miki
  - 3rd time as the emcee for JRA.

== Award winners ==
Japan Record Award

- Jackey Yoshikawa & His Blue Comets for "Blue Chateau"
  - Lyricist: Jun Hashimoto
  - Composer: Daisuke Inoue
  - Arranger: Kenichirou Morioka
  - Record Company: Columbia Records/Nippon Columbia

Vocalist Award

- Hiroshi Mizuhara for "Kimi Koso Waga Inochi"
  - Awarded JRA at 8 years ago, 2nd award.
- Yukari Itou for "Koyubi No Omoide"

New Artist Award

- Hitoshi Nagai for "Koibito To Yonde Mitai"
- Naomi Sagara for "Sekkai Wa Futari No Tameni"

Lyricist Award

- Rei Nakanishi for "Kiri No Kanatani" and "Koi No Fugue"
  - Singer: Jun Mayuzumi, The Peanuts

Composer Award

- Masaaki Hirao for "Kiri No Mashūga" and "Nagisa No Signorina"
  - Singer: Akira Fuse, Michiyo Azusa

Arranger Award

- Takeshi Terauchi for "Let's Go Unmei" and other arrangements.
  - Singer: Takeshi Terauchi & Bunnies

Planning Award

- King Records for "Uta To Oto De Tsuzuru Meiji"
  - Awarded again after 3 years, 2nd planning award.

Children's Song Award

- Suginami Junior Chorus for "Utau Hashi No Uta"

Special Award

- Yūjirō Ishihara

== See also ==
- 1967 in Japanese music
