= 4th Japan Record Awards =

1962 Japanese music awards ceremony

- Date: 27 December 1962
- Venue: Hibiya Public Hall

The 4th Japan Record Awards were held on 27 December 1962.

== Emcee ==
Takayuki Akutagawa

- 3rd time as the emcee of JRA.

== Award winners ==
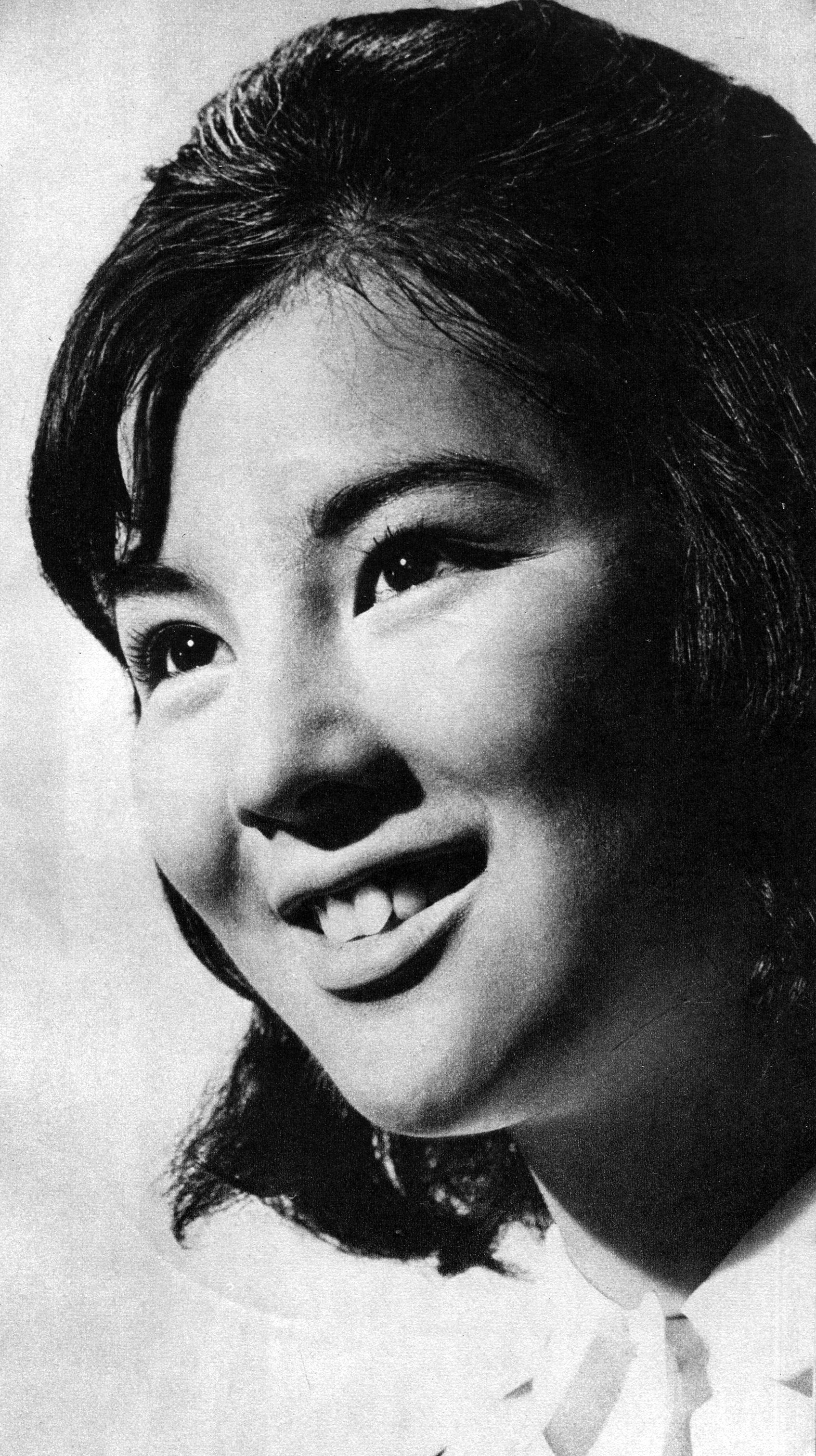
Sayuri Yoshinaga, one of the Japan Record Award awarder.

Japan Record Award

- Yukio Hashi & Sayuri Yoshinaga for "Itsudemo Yume Wo"
  - Lyricist: Takao Saeki
  - Composer: Tadashi Yoshida
  - Arranger: Tadashi Yoshida
  - Record Company: JVC Victor

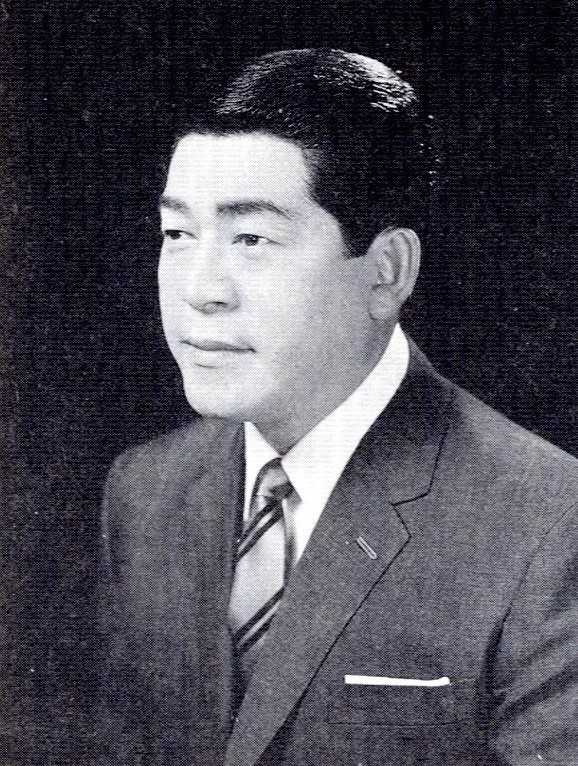
Michiya Mihashi, Vocalist Award awarder.

Vocalist Award

- Michiya Mihashi for "Hoshikuzu No Machi"

New Artist Award

- Saburō Kitajima for "Namida Fune"
- Chieko Baisho for "Shitamachi No Taiyou"

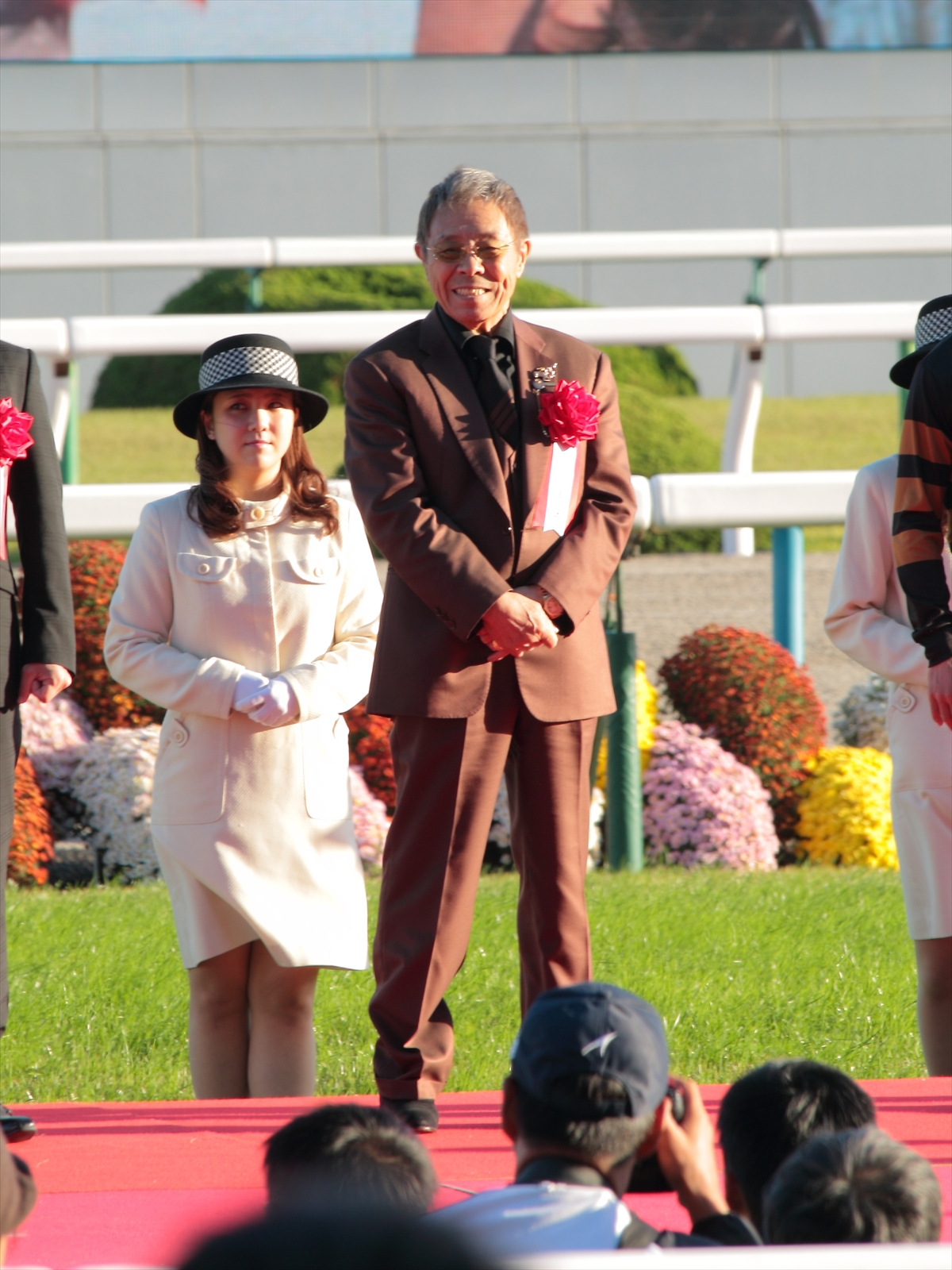
Saburō Kitajima, New Artist Award awarder.

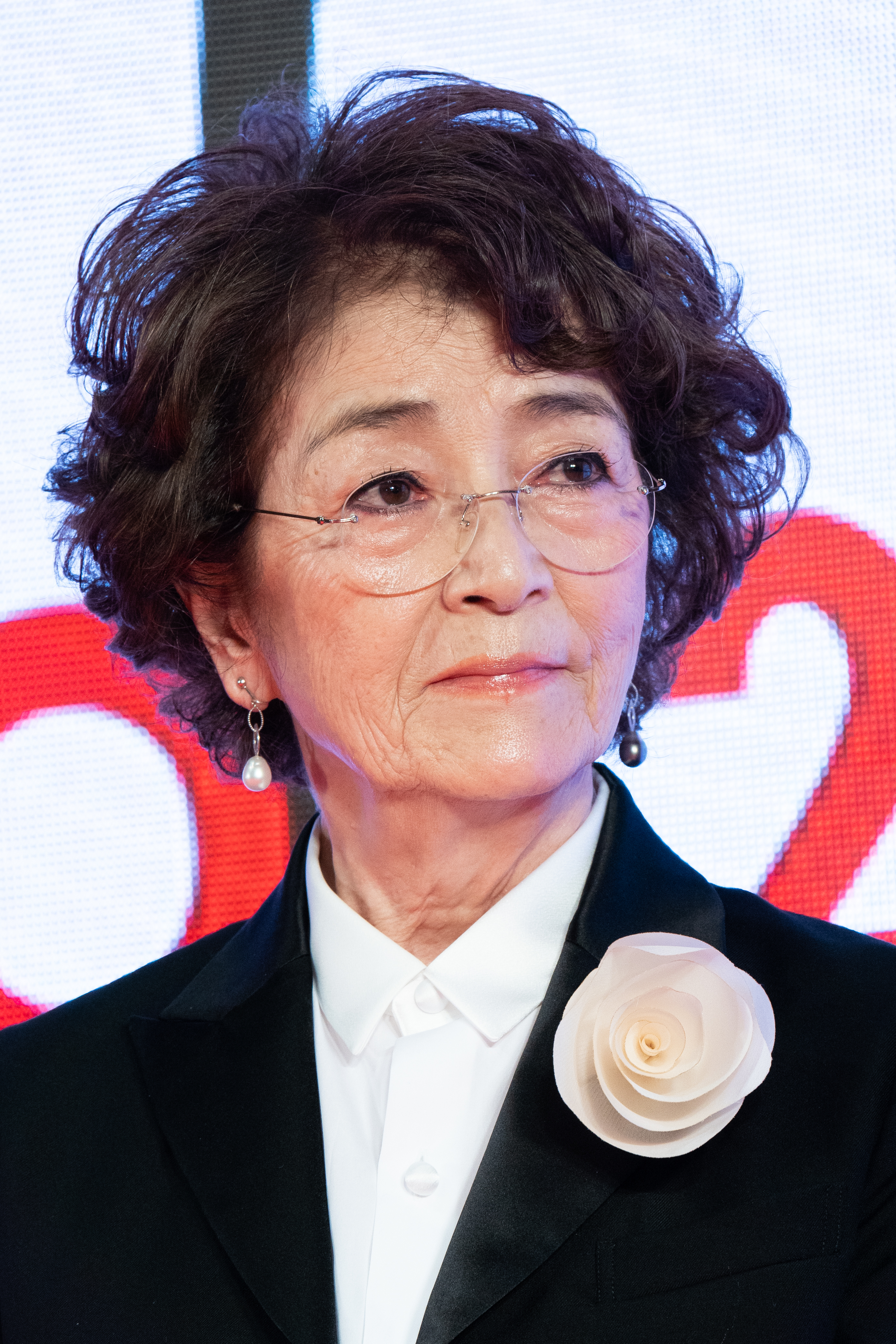
Chieko Baisho, New Artist Award awarder.

Composer Award

- Hachidai Nakamura for "Tooku E Ikitai"
  - Singer: Jerry Fujio

Arranger Award

- Makoto Saeki for "Koi No Manjuushake"
  - Singer: Hibari Misora

Planning Award

- EMI Music Japan for "Sudara Bushi" and "Hai Soremadeo"
  - Singer: Hitoshi Ueki

Children's Song Award

- Bonny Jacks for "Chisai Aki Mitsumete"

Special Award

- Hideo Murata for "Oushou"
- Sachiko Nishida for "Acacia No Ame Ga Yamu Toki"

New Composer Award

- Takao Yamashita for "TBS Shichinin No Keiji's Theme"

New Lyricist Award

- Kazuko Wakaya for "Obento Tsukete Dokoikuno"
  - Singer: Toshie Kusunoki

== See also ==
- 1962 in Japanese music
