= Mineko Nishikawa =

Japanese actress and singer (born 1958)

- Born: May 23, 1958 (age 67)
- Occupation: actress

Mineko Nishikawa (仁支川 峰子, Nishikawa Mineko; born May 23, 1958 in Aka, Fukuoka; real name Fukuda Mineko, 福田 峰子) is a Japanese actress and Enka singer who scored a number one hit in 1975 with Anata Ni Ageru.
