= 3rd Japan Record Awards =

1961 Japanese music awards ceremony

- Date: 28 December 1961
- Venue: Kyouritsu Jyoshigakuen Hall

The 3rd Japan Record Awards were held on 28 December 1961.

== Emcee ==
Takayuki Akutagawa

- 2nd time as the emcee of JRA.

== Award winners ==
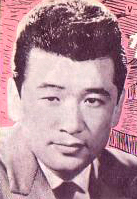
Frank Nagai, JRA winner, another award after awarded Vocalist Award 2 years ago.

Japan Record Award

- Frank Nagai for "Kimi Koishi"
  - Lyricist: Otoha Shigure
  - Composer: Kouka Sassa
  - Arranger: Shinzou Teraoka
  - Record Company: JVC Victor

Vocalist Award

- George Ai for "Garasu No Johnny"

New Artist Encouragement Award

- Miki Nakasone for "Kawa Wa Nagareru"
- Miyuki Yamanaka for "Danchi No Ojōsan"
- Kouji Hirano for "Shiroi Hana No Blues"
- Akira Matsushima for "Koshū"
- Tatsumi Fujino for "Musume Sandogasa"
- Utako Yanagi for "Saihate No Uta"

Composer Encouragement Award

- Shousuke Ichikawa for "Koishite Irundamon"
  - Singer: Chiyoko Shimakura

Arranger Award

- Masakazu Hirose for "Keijimono Datari"
  - Singer: Sachiko Nishida/ 57 All Stars

Lyricist Award

- Takao Saeki for "Shiroi Hana No Blues" and "Isobushi Genta"
  - Singer: Kouji Hirano, Yukio Hashi

Planning Award

- Nippon Columbia for "Nihon Kayō Shi"

Children's Song Award

- Toshie Kusunoki for "Kakashi No Negaigoto"

== See also ==
- 1961 in Japanese music
