= 40th Japan Record Awards =

1998 Japanese music awards ceremony

- Date: 31 December 1998
- Venue: TBS A-Studio, Tokyo
- Hosted by: Masaaki Sakai, Makiko Esumi

Television/radio coverage
- Network: TBS

The 40th Annual Japan Record Awards took place on 31 December 1998, starting at 6:30PM JST. The primary ceremonies were televised in Japan on TBS.

== Award winners ==
- Japan Record Award:
  - Tetsuya Komuro (producer) & globe for "Wanna Be A Dreammaker"
- Best Vocalist:
  - Ichiro Toba
- Best New Artist:
  - Morning Musume
- Best Album:
  - Every Little Thing for "Time to Destination"
- Special Award:
  - Céline Dion
  - hide
