= 7th Japan Record Awards =

1965 Japanese music awards ceremony

- Date: 25 December 1965
- Venue: Kyouritsu Jyoshigakuen Hall

The 7th Japan Record Awards were held on 25 December 1965.

== Emcee ==
Ayuurou Miki

== Award winners ==
Japan Record Award

- Hibari Misora for "Yawara"
  - Lyricist: Shinichi Sekizawa
  - Composer: Koga Masao
  - Arranger: Ryou Saeki
  - Record Company: Nippon Columbia

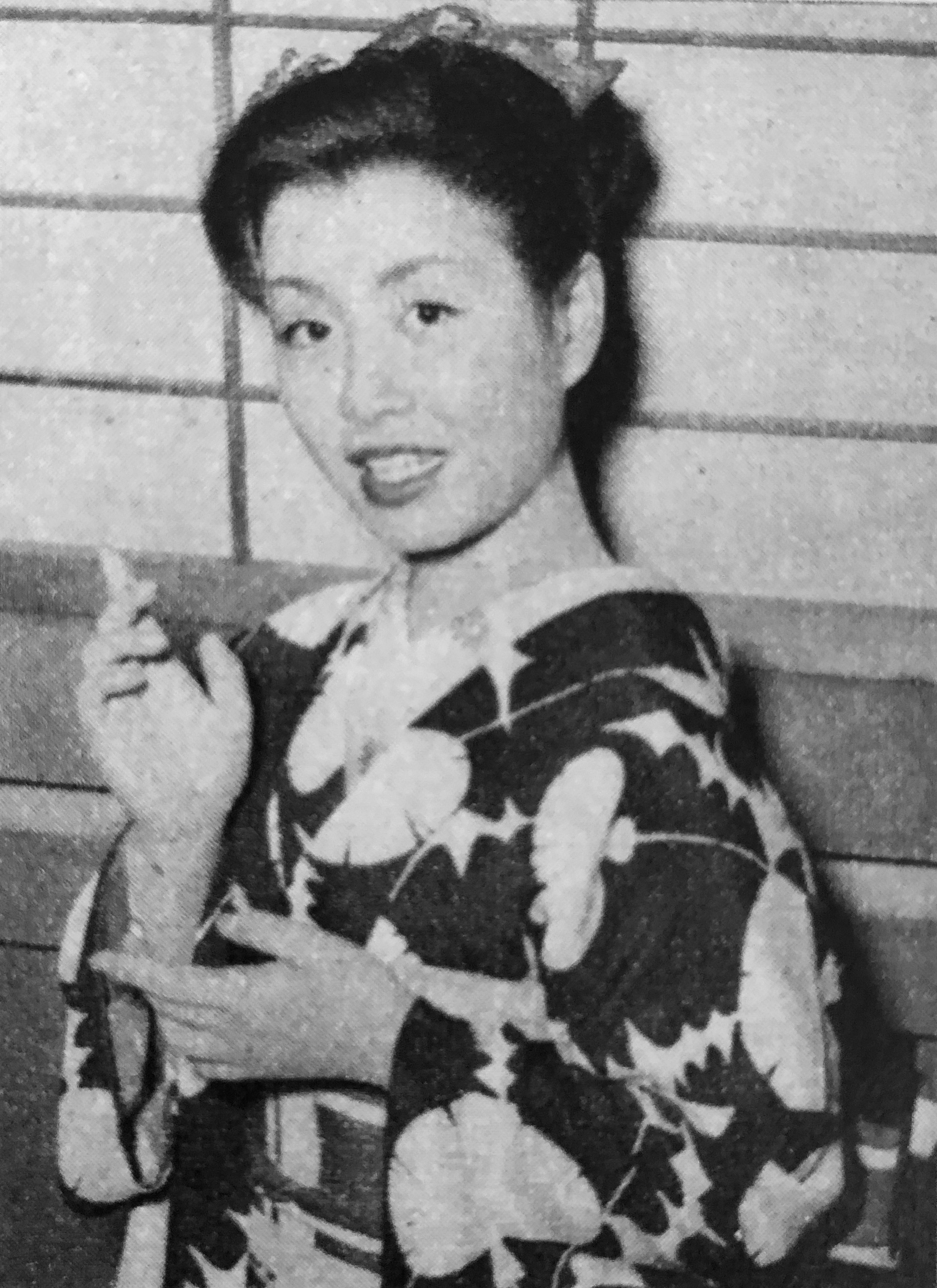
Hibari Misora, Japan Record Award awarder, awarded again after awarded Vocalist Award five year ago.

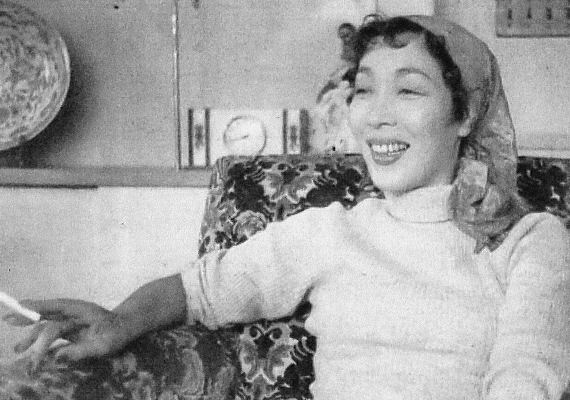
Fubuki Koshiji, Vocalist Award awarder.

Vocalist Award

- Fubuki Koshiji for "One Rainy Night In Tokyo"

New Artist Award

- Barb Satake for "Onna Gokoro No Uta"
- Miyoko Tashiro for "Aishite Aishite Aishichattanoyo"

Composer Award

- Hirooki Ogawa for "Sayonara Wa Dance No Ato Ni"
  - Singer: Chieko Baisho

Arranger Award

- Kiyoshi Yamaya for "Noche De Tokyo"
  - Singer: Katsuko Kanai

Lyricist Award

- Kazumi Yasui for "Oshaberina Shinju"
  - Singer: Yukari Itou

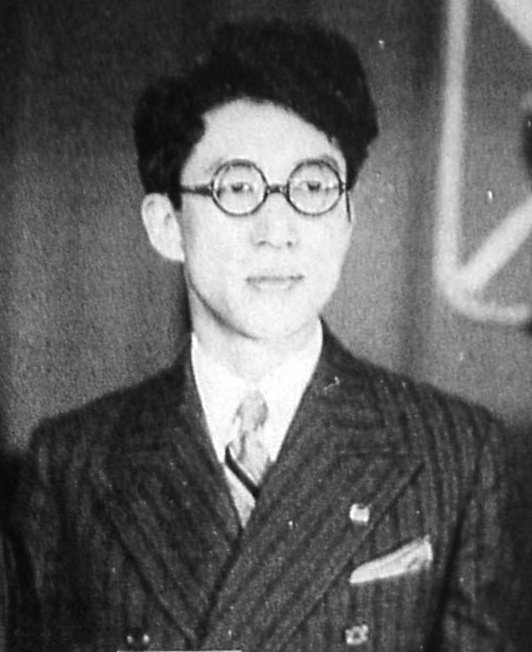
Taro Shoji, Special Award awarder.

Special Award

- Taro Shoji

Planning Award

- JVC for "Yukio Hashi and Rhythm Songs"

Children's Song Award

- Fusako Amachi and Otowa Yurikago Kai for "Marching March"

== Nominations ==
=== JRA ===
Song	Singer	Votes
Yawara	Hibari Misora	17
Ano Ko To Boku (Swim Swim Swim)	Yukio Hashi	14
Natsu No Hi No Omoide	Teruko Rino	Not mentioned.
Sayonara Wa Dance No Ato Ni	Chieko Baisho	Not mentioned.
Tsuma O Koiuru Uta	Frank Nagai	Not mentioned.

=== Vocalist Award ===
Singer	Votes
Fubuki Koshiji	19
Frank Nagai	12
Saburō Kitajima	Not Mentioned
Hachirou Izawa	Not Mentioned

=== New Artist Award ===
Male

Singer	Votes
Satake Barb	Not mentioned
Johnnys	Not mentioned
Shuuji Kanou	Not mentioned

Female

Singer	Votes
Miyoko Tashiro	Not mentioned
Emy Jackson	Not mentioned
Kiyoko Suizenji	Not mentioned
Chiyo Okumura	Not mentioned

== See also ==
- 1965 in Japanese music
