= Michiru Jo =

Japanese entertainer

Michiru Jo 城みちる
- Born: Kōtarō Jōya; 18 November 1957 (age 68); Kure, Hiroshima Prefecture, Japan
- Genres: J-pop
- Occupations: Actor; musician
- Instrument: Vocals
- Years active: 1971–present
- Education: Komazawa University

Michiru Jo (城みちる, Jō Michiru; born 18 November 1957 in present day Kure, Hiroshima, Japan, as Kōtarō Jōya) is an actor and J-pop musician in Japan.

He first became famous when he applied to a Star Tanjō! audition at the age of 15. He released his first single, "Iruka ni Notta Shounen" ('The Boy Who Rode the Dolphin'), in 1973, which was his most well-known song. At the age of 20, he stopped singing to study at the Komazawa University in Tokyo, but then left at the age of 23 to return to Hiroshima. In Hiroshima, he lived with his parents and worked for them in their electrical appliance shop. He then got married when he was 25 and moved to Tokyo. His first child (a son) was born two years later. He soon divorced but then remarried again when he was 34, and not long after that, his daughter was born.

His most famous television appearance was on the game show Takeshi's Castle during the late 1980s, where he played the role of one of the many henchmen working for Count Takeshi, portrayed by, Takeshi Kitano. Despite the rumours outside Japan, Michiru is not Takeshi Kitano's nephew.

Most recently, he got a job on the local TV channel Hiroshima TV on a programme called "Susume, sports-genkimaru", where he talked about fishing once a month. The programme is still shown in Hiroshima, but it is unknown whether or not he is still on it.

He is still listed as a "Class D Entertainer", which means that his appearance fee is between 1 and 2 million yen.
