= 46th Japan Record Awards =

2004 Japanese music awards ceremony

- Date: 31 December 2004
- Venue: New National Theatre Tokyo
- Hosted by: Masaaki Sakai, Misaki Ito

Television/radio coverage
- Network: TBS

The 46th Japan Record Awards were held on 31 December 2004, and were broadcast live on TBS.

== Award winners ==
- Japan Record Award:
  - Takeshi Kobayashi (producer), Kazutoshi Sakurai (Songwriter and Composer) & Mr. Children for Sign
- Best Vocalist:
  - Rimi Natsukawa
- Best New Artist:
  - Ai Otsuka
