= Rokusuke Ei =

Japanese lyricist, composer, author and essayist (1933–2016)

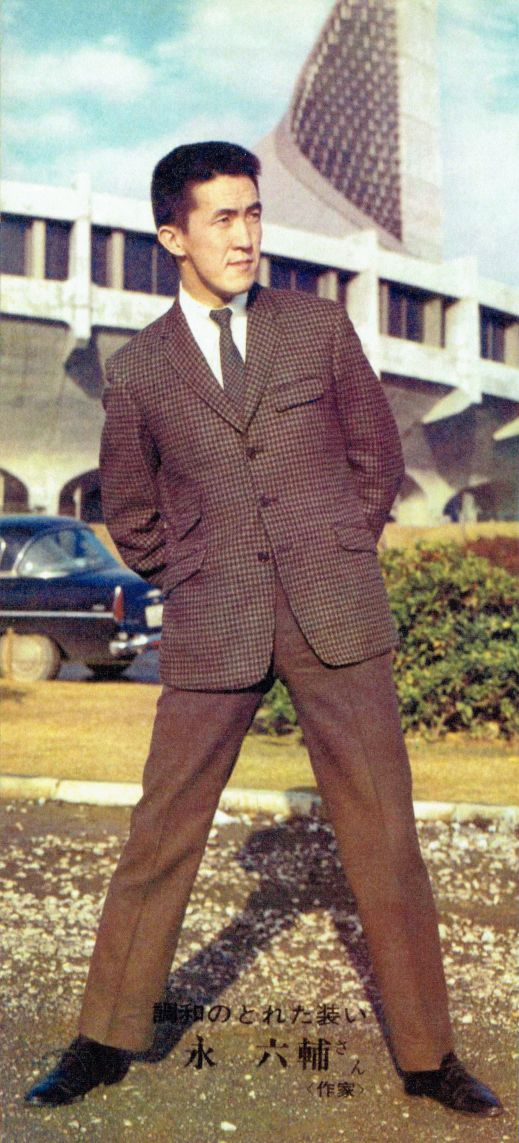
- Ei in 1966
- Born: April 10, 1933
- Died: July 7, 2016 (aged 83)
- Era: Contemporary

Rokusuke Ei (永 六輔, Ei Rokusuke; April 10, 1933 – July 7, 2016) was a Japanese lyricist, composer, author, essayist, and television personality of Chinese descent.

Ei wrote the lyrics to the song "Ue o Muite Arukō", known internationally as "Sukiyaki", which has been used in several English language films. He also wrote the lyrics to the song "Miagete Goran Yoru no Hoshi o" sung by Kyu Sakamoto in 1963. He was a graduate of Waseda University.

== Books ==
- (1985) Bōryokudan narabini Inakappē shokun! (暴力団ならびに田舎ッペェ諸君!)
- (1986) Roku, hachi, kyū no kyū : Sakamoto Kyū Monogatari (六・八・九の九 : 坂本九ものがたり, Six, eight, nine of nine : Kyū Sakamoto story)
- (1987) Mumei-jin mei-goroku (無名人名語録)
- (1990) Ippan-jin mei-goroku (一般人名語録)
- (1993) Motto shikkari, Nihonjin (もっとしっかり、日本人)
- (1994) Daiōjō (大往生, A peaceful death)
- Tōku e ikitai (遠くへ行きたい, I want to go to far away)
- Shinku no kohaku (真紅の琥珀, Amber of crimson)
- Daiichi Seimei Kōhō Buchō kara no tegami (第一生命広報部長からの手紙, Letter from chief of Dai-ichi Life PR department)

== TV shows ==
- Shichiji ni aimashō

== Radio programs ==
- Dareka to Dokoka de (誰かとどこかで) TBS Radio
- Doyō waido Radio Tōkyō (土曜ワイドラジオTOKYO, Saturday Variety show Radio TOKYO) TBS Radio

== Lyrics ==
- (1959) "Kuroi hanabira" (黒い花びら); "Black Petals"
- (1961) "Ue o muite arukō" (上を向いて歩こう); "Sukiyaki"
- (1962) "Tōku e ikitai" (遠くへ行きたい); "I want to go to far away"
- (1963) "Miagete Goran Yoru no Hoshi o" (見上げてごらん夜の星を)
- (1963) "Wakai kisetsu" (若い季節)
- (1963) "Konnichiwa akachan" (こんにちは赤ちゃん)
- (1965) "Kaerokana" (帰ろかな)
- (1979) "Hajimete no machi de" (初めての街で)
