= AAA discography =

Recordings by Japanese pop group

- Studio albums: 11
- EPs: 6
- Live albums: 8
- Compilation albums: 7
- Tribute albums: 1
- Singles: 52
- Remix albums: 3

The discography of Japanese pop group AAA includes eleven studio albums, six extended plays, seven compilation albums, eight live albums, one cover album, three remix albums, and 52 singles. All of the group's releases have been with Avex Trax, a subsidiary of Avex Group.

== Albums ==
=== Studio albums ===
Title	Album details	Peak chart positions		Sales (Note: Sales provided by Oricon database and are rounded to the nearest thousand copies.)	Certifications
Title	Album details	Oricon Albums Chart	Billboard Japan Top Albums (Note: Week references for Billboard Japan Top Albums Sales: Attack All Around, Choice Is Yours, Departure, AAA Remix: Non-Stop All Singles, Heartful, Buzz Communication, #AAABEST, Another Side of #AAABEST, 777: Triple Seven, Ballad Collection, Eighth Wonder, Driving Mix, Gold Symphony.)	Sales	Certifications
Attack	Released: January 1, 2006; Label: Avex Trax; Format: CD, digital download	16	—	57,000 (Note: Oricon did not make a distinction between the studio album and EP Attack, thus combined their sales.)	
All	Released: January 1, 2007; Label: Avex Trax; Format: CD, digital download	24	—	33,000	
Around	Released: September 19, 2007; Label: Avex Trax; Format: CD, digital download	8	—	28,000	
Departure	Released: February 11, 2009; Label: Avex Trax; Format: CD, digital download	4	6	24,000	
Heartful	Released: February 17, 2010; Label: Avex Trax; Format: CD, digital download	3	5	50,543	
Buzz Communication	Released: February 16, 2011; Label: Avex Trax; Format: CD, digital download	2	2	71,744	
777: Triple Seven	Released: August 22, 2012; Label: Avex Trax; Format: CD, digital download	2	2	65,235	
Eighth Wonder	Released: September 18, 2013; Label: Avex Trax; Format: CD, digital download	1	1	64,535	
Gold Symphony	Released: October 1, 2014; Label: Avex Trax; Format: CD, digital download	1	1	82,350	RIAJ: Gold
Way of Glory	Released: February 22, 2017; Label: Avex Trax; Format: CD, digital download	1	1	135,082	RIAJ: Gold
Color a Life	Release date: August 29, 2018; Label: Avex Trax; Format: CD, DVD, digital download	1	7	88,000	RIAJ: Gold

=== Extended plays ===
Title	Album details	Peak chart positions		Sales	Certifications
Title	Album details	Oricon Albums Chart	Billboard Japan Top Albums	Sales	Certifications
Attack	Released: January 1, 2006; Label: Avex Trax; Format: CD, digital download	16	—	57,000	
All/2	Released: September 13, 2006; Label: Avex Trax; Format: CD, digital download	12	—	26,000	
AlohAAA	Released: March 21, 2007; Label: Avex Trax; Format: CD, digital download	39	—	6,000	
Choice Is Yours	Released: June 18, 2008; Label: Avex Trax; Format: CD, digital download	10	12	16,000	
6th Album "Buzz Communication" Pre-Release Special Mini Album	Released: January 12, 2011; Label: Avex Trax; Format: CD rental	—	—		
Ballad Collection: Special Solo Self-Cover	Released: March 13, 2012; Label: Avex Trax; Format: Digital download	—	—		

=== Compilation albums ===
Title	Album details	Peak chart positions		Sales	Certifications
Title	Album details	Oricon Albums Chart	Billboard Japan Top Albums	Sales	Certifications
Attack All Around	Released: March 5, 2008; Label: Avex Trax; Format: CD, digital download	5	5	42,000	
#AAABEST	Released: September 14, 2011; Label: Avex Trax; Format: CD, digital download	1	1	101,000	RIAJ: Gold
Another Side of #AAABEST	Released: March 21, 2012; Label: Avex Trax; Format: CD, digital download	4	8	36,000	
Ballad Collection	Released: March 13, 2013; Label: Avex Trax; Format: CD, digital download	4	11	26,000	
AAA Start Up: Ouen Song Best (AAA Start Up~応援ソングBEST~)	Released: February 19, 2014; Label: Avex Trax; Format: Digital download	—	—		
AAA Natsu Uta Best (AAA 夏うたBEST; AAA Summer Song Best)	Released: July 2, 2014; Label: Avex Trax; Format: Digital download	—	—		
AAA 10th Anniversary Best	Released: September 16, 2015; Label: Avex Trax; Format: CD, digital download	1	-	173,000	RIAJ: Gold
AAA 15th Anniversary All Time Best -thanx AAA lot-	Released: February 19, 2020; Label: Avex Trax; Format: CD, digital download	1	-	115,500	RIAJ: Gold

=== Live albums ===
Title	Album details
2nd Attack at Zepp Tokyo on 29th of June 2006	Released: September 13, 2006; Label: Avex Trax; Format: Digital download
1st Anniversary Live: 3rd Attack 060913 at Nippon Budokan	Released: April 8, 2009; Label: Avex Trax; Format: Digital download
AAA Tour 2007 4th Attack at Shibuya-AX on 4th of April	Released: April 15, 2009; Label: Avex Trax; Format: Digital download
AAA 2nd Anniversary Live: 5th Attack 070922 Nippon Budokan	Released: April 22, 2009; Label: Avex Trax; Format: Digital download
AAA Tour 2008: Attack All Around at NHK Hall on 4th of April	Released: April 29, 2009; Label: Avex Trax; Format: Digital download
3rd Anniversary Live 080922-080923 Nippon Budokan	Released: May 6, 2009; Label: Avex Trax; Format: Digital download
AAA Tour 2012: 777 Triple Seven	Released: February 23, 2013; Label: Avex Trax; Format: Digital download
AAA Tour 2013 Eighth Wonder	Released: December 25, 2013; Label: Avex Trax; Format: Digital download

=== Cover albums ===
Title	Album details	Peak chart positions		Sales	Certifications
Title	Album details	Oricon Albums Chart	Billboard Japan Top Albums	Sales	Certifications
CCC: Challenge Cover Collection	Released: February 7, 2007; Label: Avex Trax; Format: CD, digital download	13	—	17,000	

=== Remix albums ===
Title	Album details	Peak chart positions		Sales	Certifications
Title	Album details	Oricon Albums Chart	Billboard Japan Top Albums	Sales	Certifications
Remix Attack	Released: January 1, 2006; Label: Avex Trax; Format: CD, digital download	92	—	4,000	
AAA Remix: Non-Stop All Singles	Released: March 4, 2009; Label: Avex Trax; Format: CD, digital download	58	85		
Driving Mix	Released: December 25, 2013; Label: Avex Trax; Format: CD, digital download	7	16	17,000	

== Singles ==
=== As a lead artist ===
==== 2000s ====
Title	Year	Peak chart positions			Sales	Certifications	Album
Title	Year	Oricon Singles Chart	Billboard Japan Hot 100 (Note: Week references for Billboard Japan Hot 100: "Mirage", "Beyond (Karada no Kanata)", "Music", "Tabidachi no Uta", "Break Down", "Hide-Away", "Heart and Soul", "Aitai Riyū", "Dream After Dream (Yume Kara Sameta Yume)", "Makenai Kokoro", "Paradise", "Daiji na Koto", "No Cry No More", "Call", "Charge & Go!", "Sailing", "Still Love You", "777 (We Can Sing a Song!)", "Niji", "Miss You", "Party It Up", "Love Is in the Air", "Koi Oto to Amazora", "Love", "Wake Up!", "Sayonara no Mae ni", "Next Stage", "I'll Be There", "Lil' Infinity", "Boku no Yuuutsu to Fukigen na Kanojo", "Game Over?", "Ashita no Hikari", "Flavor of Kiss", "Lover".)	RIAJ (Note: Week references for RIAJ Digital Track Chart: "Break Down", "Summer Revolution", "Hide-Away", "With You", "Heart and Soul", "Aitai Riyū", "Dream After Dream (Yume Kara Sameta Yume)", "Makenai Kokoro", "Paradise", "Daiji na Koto", "No Cry No More", "Call", "I4U", "Charge & Go!", "Lights", "Sailing", "Wishes", "Still Love You", "I$M", "Aitai Riyuu (Winter Version)", "Thank You", "AAA Solo Self Cover Special Medley".)	Sales	Certifications	Album
"Blood on Fire"	2005	9	—	—	58,000		Attack
"Friday Party"	2005	17	—	—	17,000		Attack
"Kirei na Sora" (きれいな空; "Beautiful Sky")	2005	17	—	—	13,000		Attack
"Dragon Fire"	2005	20	—	—	21,000		Attack
"Hallelujah" (ハレルヤ)	2006	8	—	—	28,000		All
"Shalala Kibou no Uta" (Shalala キボウの歌; "Shalala Song of Hope")	2006	20	—	—	13,000		All
"Hurricane Riri, Boston Mari" (ハリケーン・リリ，ボストン・マリ)	2006	10	—	—	20,000		All
"Soul Edge Boy" (ソウルエッジボーイ)	2006	12	—	—	23,000		All
"Kimono Jet Girl" (キモノジェットガール)	2006	12	—	—	23,000		All
"Let It Beat!"	2006	7	—	—	21,000		All
"Q"	2006	10	—	—	15,000		All
"Chewing Gum" (チューインガム)	2006	7	—	—	15,000		All
"Black & White"	2006	15	—	—	25,000		All
"Get Chu!" (Getチュー!)	2007	5	—	—	41,000	RIAJ (digital): Gold	Around
"She no Jijitsu" (SHEの事実; "The Truth About She")	2007	5	—	—	41,000		Around
"Kuchibiru Kara Romantica" (唇からロマンチカ; "Romantica from My Lips")	2007	6	—	—	32,000		Around
"That's Right"	2007	6	—	—	32,000		Around
"Natsu Mono" (夏もの; "Summer Things")	2007	5	—	—	33,000		Around
"Red Soul"	2007	15	—	—	9,000		Around
"Mirage"	2008	1	2	—	33,000		Attack All Around
"Beyond (Karada no Kanata)" (Beyond〜カラダノカナタ; "Beyond (The Other Side of the Body)")	2008	6	16	—	21,000		Departure
"Music!!!"	2008	9	19	—	32,000	RIAJ (digital): Gold	Departure
"Zero"	2008	9	—	—	32,000		Departure
"Tabidachi no Uta" (旅ダチノウタ; "Journey's Song")	2009	4	21	—	25,000		Departure
"Break Down"	2009	3	11	30	48,162		Heartful
"Break Your Name"	2009	3	—	—	48,162		Heartful
"Summer Revolution"	2009	3	—	82	48,162		Heartful
"Hide-Away"	2009	2	8	16	52,575		Heartful
"Hide & Seek"	2009	2	—	—	52,575		Heartful
"Find You"	2009	2	—	—	52,575		Heartful

==== 2010s ====
Title	Year	Peak chart positions			Sales	Certifications	Album
Title	Year	Oricon Singles Chart	Billboard Japan Hot 100	RIAJ	Sales	Certifications	Album
"Heart and Soul"	2010	3	15	31	37,214		Heartful
"Aitai Riyū (逢いたい理由; "To Meet with a Reason")	2010	1	13	12	59,833	RIAJ (digital): Gold	Buzz Communication
"Dream After Dream (Yume Kara Sameta Yume)" (Dream After Dream ~夢から醒めた夢~; "Dream After Dream (Waking from a Dream Right into Another Dream)")	2010	1	26	29	59,833		Buzz Communication
"Makenai Kokoro" (負けない心; "Undefeated Heart")	2010	3	5	10	57,707	RIAJ (digital): Gold	Buzz Communication
"Paradise"	2010	5	8	20	57,856		Buzz Communication
"Endless Fighters"	2010	5	—	—	57,856		Buzz Communication
"Daiji na Koto" (ダイジナコト; "Important Things")	2011	5	19	24	31,914		Buzz Communication
"No Cry No More"	2011	3	4	13	57,527	RIAJ (digital): Gold	#AAABEST
"Call"	2011	5	8	18	45,753		#AAABEST
"I4U"	2011	5	—	35	45,753		Another Side of #AAABEST
"Charge & Go!"	2011	5	13	22	57,080		777: Triple Seven
"Lights"	2011	5	—	69	57,080		777: Triple Seven
"Sailing"	2012	4	8	20	48,647		777: Triple Seven
"Still Love You"	2012	3	8	10	58,801		777: Triple Seven
"777 (We Can Sing a Song!)"	2012	4	8	—	44,003	RIAJ (digital): Gold	777: Triple Seven
"Niji" (虹; "Rainbow")	2012	3	6	—	46,466	RIAJ (digital): Gold	Eighth Wonder
"Miss You""	2013	3	7	—	46,146		Eighth Wonder
"Hohoemi no Saku Basho" (ほほえみの咲く場所; "Smile's Blooming Place")	2013	3	—	—	46,146		Eighth Wonder
"Party It Up"	2013	7	14	—	39,175		Eighth Wonder
"Love Is in the Air"	2013	3	8	—	52,206		Eighth Wonder
"Koi Oto to Amazora" (恋音と雨空; "Rainy Skies and Love Sound")	2013	3	5	—	46,180	RIAJ (digital): 2× Platinum; RIAJ (streaming): Platinum	Eighth Wonder
"Love"	2014	4	7	—	31,512		Gold Symphony
"Show Time" (Note: A fan-club-only release; not eligible for charting.)	2014	—	—	—			Non-album single
"Wake Up!"	2014	3	4	—	56,164	RIAJ (digital): Gold	Gold Symphony
"Sayonara no Mae ni" (さよならの前に; "Before Goodbye")	2014	5	3	—	33,557	RIAJ (digital): Platinum; RIAJ (streaming): Platinum	Gold Symphony
"I'll Be There"	2015	4	15	—	58,607		AAA 10th Anniversary Best
"Lil' Infinity"	2015	3	3	—	59,732	RIAJ (digital): Gold	AAA 10th Anniversary Best
"Boku no Yūuutsu to Fukigen na Kanojo" (ぼくの憂鬱と不機嫌な彼女; "My Melancholy and Moody Girlfriend")	2015	4	4	—	55,672	RIAJ (digital): Gold	AAA 10th Anniversary Best
"Game Over?"	2015	5	20	—	51,651		AAA 10th Anniversary Best
"Ashita no Hikari" (アシタノヒカリ; "Light of Tomorrow")	2015	4	15	—	56,122	RIAJ (digital): Gold	AAA 10th Anniversary Best
"Flavor of Kiss"	2015	2	11	—	47,066		AAA 10th Anniversary Best
"Lover"	2015	4	3	—	49,000	RIAJ (digital): Gold	AAA 10th Anniversary Best
"Aishiteru no ni, Aisenai" (愛してるのに、愛せな; "Even Though I Love You, I Can't")	2015	4	—	—	33,738	RIAJ (digital): Gold; RIAJ (streaming): Gold	AAA 10th Anniversary Best
"NEW"	2016	3	3	—	43,903		WAY OF GLORY
Namida no nai Sekai (涙のない世界)	2016	3	—	—	57,104		WAY OF GLORY
"MAGIC"	2017	2	—	—	51,124	RIAJ (digital): Gold	WAY OF GLORY
"No Way Back"	2017	3	—	—	41,573		COLOR A LIFE
"LIFE"	2017	4	—	—	44,093		COLOR A LIFE
"DEJAVU"	2018	—	21	—			COLOR A LIFE
"Egao no Loop"	2018	2	—	—	19,330		AAA 15th Anniversary All Time Best -thanx AAA lot-
"Bad Love"	2019	5	—	—	16,282		AAA 15th Anniversary All Time Best -thanx AAA lot-

=== Other singles ===
Title	Year	Peak chart positions			Sales	Certifications	Album
Title	Year	Oricon Singles Chart	Billboard Japan Hot 100	RIAJ	Sales	Certifications	Album
"Climax Jump" (as AAA Den-O Form)	2007	5	—	—	110,000	RIAJ (physical): Gold; RIAJ (digital): Platinum	Attack All Around
"Izayuke Wakataka Gundan 2007" (いざゆけ若鷹軍団2007) (Fukuoka SoftBank Hawks with AAA)	2007	33	—	—	7,000		Attack All Around

=== Digital singles ===
Title	Year	Peak chart positions		Certifications	Album
Title	Year	Billboard Japan Hot 100	RIAJ	Certifications	Album
Otoko Dake Da to,...Kō Narimashita! (男だけだと、・・・こうなりました!) (Note: Otoko Dake Da to,...Kō Narimashita! is a four-track single featuring the songs "Crash", "Hasta la Vista", "Akireru Kurai Wagamama na Jiyū", and "Bet".)	2007	—	—		Non-album singles
"Aitai Riyuu (Winter Version)"	2010	—	47		Non-album singles
"Thank You"	2011	—	91		Non-album singles
"Charge & Go!"	2011	13	22		777: Triple Seven
"#AAABEST Special Selection"	2011	—	—		Non-album single
"Music!!! (from Buzz Communication Tour 2011 Deluxe Edition)"	2011	—	—		AAA Buzz Communication Tour 2011 Deluxe Edition
"Day by Day (from Buzz Communication Tour 2011 Deluxe Edition)"	2011	—	—		AAA Buzz Communication Tour 2011 Deluxe Edition
"Aitai Riyuu (from Buzz Communication Tour 2011 Deluxe Edition)"	2011	—	—		AAA Buzz Communication Tour 2011 Deluxe Edition
"Paradise (from Buzz Communication Tour 2011 Deluxe Edition)"	2011	—	—		AAA Buzz Communication Tour 2011 Deluxe Edition
"Believe Own Way (from Buzz Communication Tour 2011 Deluxe Edition)"	2011	—	—		AAA Buzz Communication Tour 2011 Deluxe Edition
"Heart and Soul (from Buzz Communication Tour 2011 Deluxe Edition)"	2011	—	—		AAA Buzz Communication Tour 2011 Deluxe Edition
"Charge & Go! (from Buzz Communication Tour 2011 Deluxe Edition)"	2011	—	—		AAA Buzz Communication Tour 2011 Deluxe Edition
"No Cry No More (from Buzz Communication Tour 2011 Deluxe Edition)"	2011	—	—		AAA Buzz Communication Tour 2011 Deluxe Edition
"Daiji na Koto (from Buzz Communication Tour 2011 Deluxe Edition)"	2011	—	—		AAA Buzz Communication Tour 2011 Deluxe Edition
"Lights (Winter Version)"	2011	—	—		Non-album singles
"AAA 2011 Single Sabi Medley (Daiji na Koto - No Cry No More - Call - Charge & Go!!)"	2011	—	—		Non-album singles
"AAA Solo Self Cover Special Medley"	2012	—	48		Non-album singles
"Wake up! (Anime Ver.)"	2014	—	—		Non-album singles
"Hands"	2014	—	—		Gold Symphony
"Kaze ni Kaoru Natsu no Kioku" (風に薫る夏の記憶; "Scent of Summer Memories on the Wind")	2014	—	—		Gold Symphony
"Next Stage (Anime Ver.)"	2014	—	—		"Sayonara no Mae ni"
"Yell"	—	—			

=== Other charted songs ===
Title	Year	Peak chart positions		Certifications	Album
Title	Year	Billboard Japan Hot 100	RIAJ	Certifications	Album
"With You"	2009	—	35		"Hide-Away/Hide & Seek/Find You"
"Wishes"	2012	—	96		777: Triple Seven
"I$M"	2012	—	89		777: Triple Seven
"Next Stage"	2014	74	—		Gold Symphony

== See also ==
- AAA videography
- Discography
