= AAA videography =

AAA video discography
- Music videos: 71
- Video albums: 32

The videography of Japanese pop group AAA includes 71 music videos and 32 video albums.

== Music videos ==
Title	Year	Director(s)
"Blood on Fire"	2005	Shinichi Kudō
"Friday Party"	2005	Shinichi Kudō
"Kirei na Sora" (きれいな空; "Beautiful Sky")	2005	Kenji Sonoda
"Dragon Fire"	2005	Ippei Morita
"Hallelujah" (ハレルヤ)	2006	Ippei Morita
"Shalala Kibou no Uta" (Shalala キボウの歌; "Shalala Song of Hope")	2006	Tomoo Noda
"Hurricane Riri, Boston Mari" (ハリケーン・リリ，ボストン・マリ)	2006	Tetsurō Takeuchi
"Soul Edge Boy" (ソウルエッジボーイ)	2006	Tetsuo Inoue
"Kimono Jet Girl" (キモノジェットガール)	2006	Fūta
"Let It Beat!"	2006	Masaki Ōkita
"Q"	2006	Takuya Tada
"Yume no Kakera" (夢ノカケラ)	2006	
"Chewing Gum" (チューインガム)	2006	Tetsuo Inoue
"Winter Lander!!!"	2006	
"Samurai Heart (Samurai Tamashi)" (Samurai Heart -侍魂-)	2006	Hideaki Sunaga
"Mikansei" (ミカンセイ)	2007	
"Minna Star!" (みんなスター！)	2007	
"Crazy Gonna Crazy"	2007	Ippei Morita
"Wonderful Life"	2007	
"Izayuke Wakataka Gundan 2007" (いざゆけ若鷹軍団2007)	2007	Kazutoshi Fuku
"She no Jijitsu" (SHEの事実; "The Truth About She")	2007	
"Get Chu!" ("Get チュー!")	2007	Ippei Morita
"That's Right"	2007	
"Kuchibiru Kara Romantica" (唇からロマンチカ; "Romantica from My Lips")	2007	Kensuke Kawamura
"Sunshine"	2007	Ukon Uemura
"No End Summer"	2007	
"Hanabi" (花火; "Fireworks")	2007	
"Red Soul"	2007	Ippei Morita
"Mirage"	2008	Ugichin
"Beyond (Karada no Kanata)" (BEYOND~カラダノカナタ; "Beyond (The Other Side of the Body)")	2008	Tarō Okagawa
"Crash"	2008	Ryou Higuchi
"Zero"	2008	Tarō Okagawa
"Music!!!"	2008	Hideaki Sunaga
"Tabidachi no Uta" (旅ダチノウタ; "Journey's Song")	2009	Spicy
"Jamboree!!"	2009	Ippei Morita
"Break Down"	2009	Yasuyuki Hoshi, Shinichi Kudō
"Break Your Name"	2009	
"Summer Revolution"	2009	Shinichi Kudō
"Hide-away"	2009	Nino
"Hide & Seek"	2009	Nino
"Find You"	2009	Nino
"Heart and Soul"	2010	Nino
"Field"	2010	Nino
"Aitai Riyū" (逢いたい理由; "To Meet with a Reason")	2010	Nino
"Dream After Dream (Yume Kara Sameta Yume)" (Dream After Dream ~夢から醒めた夢~; "Dream After Dream (Waking from a Dream Right into Another Dream)")	2010	Nino
"Makenai Kokoro" (負けない心; "Undefeated Heart")	2010	Nino
"Paradise"	2010	Tetsuo Inoue
"Daiji na Koto" (ダイジナコト; "Important Things")	2011	Tetsuo Inoue
"Step"	2011	Tetsuo Inoue
"No Cry No More"	2011	Ryūji Seki
"Call"	2011	Smith
"Charge & Go!"	2011	Hideaki Fukui
"Wishes"	2012	
"Sailing"	2012	
"Still Love You"	2012	
"777 (We Can Sing a Song!)"	2012	
"I$M"	2012	
"Niji" (虹; "Rainbow")	2012	Itakura Ichiro
"Miss You"	2013	Nobu Suekichi
"Party It Up"	2013	
"Love Is in the Air"	2013	Makoto Kokorozashi Mutō
"Koi Oto to Amazora" (恋音と雨空; "Rainy Skies and Love Sound")	2013	
"Love"	2014	Akihisa Takashiro
"Show Time"	2014	Takeshi Maruyama
"Wake Up!"	2014	Ippei Morita
"Kaze ni Kaoru Natsu no Kioku" (風に薫る夏の記憶; "Scent of Summer Memories on the Wind")	2014	Kanji Sutō
"Sayonara no Mae ni" (さよならの前に; "Before Goodbye")	2014	Sayaka Nakane
"Lil' Infinity"	2015	Kanji Sutō
"Ashita no Hikari" (アシタノヒカリ; "Light of Tomorrow")	2015	
"Lover"	2015	
"Aishiteru no ni, Aisenai" (愛してるのに、愛せない; "Even Though I Love You, I Can't")	2015	
"NEW"	2016	
"Namida no nai Sekai" (涙のない世界; "A World Without Tears")	2016	
"Jewel"	2016	
"YELL"	2016	
"Magic"	2017	
"No Way Back"	2017	
"LIFE"	2017	

== Concert tour films ==
Title	Album details	Peak chart positions		Certifications
Title	Album details	Oricon DVD Chart	Oricon Blu-ray Chart	Certifications
1st Attack at Shibuya-AX	Released: March 23, 2006; Label: Avex Trax; Format: DVD	36	—	
2nd Attack at Zepp Tokyo on 29th of June 2006	Released: September 13, 2006; Label: Avex Trax; Format: DVD	10	—	
1st Anniversary Live: 3rd Attack 060913 at Nippon Budokan	Released: January 1, 2007; Label: Avex Trax; Format: DVD	32	—	
AAA Tour 2007 4th Attack at Shibuya-AX on 4th of April	Released: July 18, 2007; Label: Avex Trax; Format: DVD	12	—	
AAA 2nd Anniversary Live: 5th Attack 070922 Nippon Budokan	Released: January 9, 2008; Label: Avex Trax; Format: DVD	4	—	
AAA Tour 2008: Attack All Around at NHK Hall on 4th of April	Released: August 27, 2008; Label: Avex Trax; Format: DVD	6	—	
3rd Anniversary Live 080922-080923 Nippon Budokan	Released: January 14, 2009; Label: Avex Trax; Format: DVD	3	—	
AAA Tour 2009: A Departure Party	Released: August 12, 2009; Label: Avex Trax; Format: DVD	4	—	
AAA 4th Anniversary Live 090922 at Yokohama Arena	Released: March 3, 2010; Label: Avex Trax; Format: DVD	2	—	
AAA Heart to Heart Tour 2010	Released: September 29, 2010; Label: Avex Trax; Format: DVD, Blu-ray	7	—	
AAA 5th Anniversary Live 100912 at Yokohama Arena	Released: March 16, 2011; Label: Avex Trax; Format: DVD, Blu-ray	1	—	
AAA Buzz Communication Tour 2011 Deluxe Edition	Released: November 16, 2011; Label: Avex Trax; Format: DVD, Blu-ray	4	—	
AAA 6th Anniversary Tour 2011.9.28 at Zepp Tokyo	Released: February 22, 2012; Label: Avex Trax; Format: DVD, Blu-ray	4	—	
AAA Tour 2012: 777 Triple Seven	Released: February 13, 2013; Label: Avex Trax; Format: DVD, Blu-ray	1	2	
AAA Tour 2013 Eighth Wonder	Released: January 22, 2014; Label: Avex Trax; Format: DVD, Blu-ray	1	4	
AAA Arena Tour 2014: Gold Symphony	Released: February 25, 2016; Label: Avex Trax; Format: DVD, Blu-ray	2	6	
AAA 10th Anniversary SPECIAL Yagai LIVE in Fuji-Q Highland (AAA 10th Anniversary SPECIAL 野外LIVE in 富士急ハイランド)	Released: January 27, 2015; Label: Avex Trax; Format: DVD, Blu-ray	2		RIAJ: Gold
AAA 10th ANNIVERSARY Documentary ~Road of 10th ANNIVERSARY~	Released: March 16, 2016; Label: Avex Trax; Format: DVD, Blu-ray			

== Video albums ==
Title	Album details	Peak chart positions	Certifications
Title	Album details	JPN	Certifications
Channel@×AAA	Released: March 21, 2007; Label: Avex Trax; Format: DVD	25	
Theater of AAA: Bokura no Te (Theater of AAA ~ボクラノテ~; Theater of AAA: Our Hands)	Released: June 20, 2007; Label: Avex Trax; Format: DVD	54	
Super Battle Live Delicious Gakuin Bangaihen: Delicious 5 Shijō Saidai no Teki (スーパーバトルライブ 美味學院 番外編～デリシャス5 史上最強の敵～)	Released: March 12, 2008; Label: Avex Trax; Format: DVD	39	
PPP: Premium Performance Party (Note: A fan-club-only release; not eligible for charting.)	Released: March 15, 2008; Label: Avex Trax; Format: DVD	—	
AAA Meets Mirai Seiki Shakespeare (AAA meets 未来世紀シェイクスピア ナビゲート)	Released: January 23, 2009; Label: Avex Trax; Format: DVD	58	
Mirai Seiki Shakespeare #01 The Merchant of Venice (未来世紀シェイクスピア #01 ヴェニスの商人)	Released: February 27, 2009; Label: Avex Trax; Format: DVD	112	
Mirai Seiki Shakespeare #02 Romeo and Juliet (未来世紀シェイクスピア #02 ロミオとジュリエット)	Released: February 27, 2009; Label: Avex Trax; Format: DVD	123	
Channel@×AAA Sono 2	Released: March 4, 2009; Label: Avex Trax; Format: DVD	29	
Mirai Seiki Shakespeare #03 Othello (未来世紀シェイクスピア #03 オセロー)	Released: March 27, 2009; Label: Avex Trax; Format: DVD	145	
Mirai Seiki Shakespeare #04 A Midsummer Night's Dream (未来世紀シェイクスピア #04 夏の夜の夢)	Released: March 27, 2009; Label: Avex Trax; Format: DVD	157	
Mirai Seiki Shakespeare #05 King Lear (未来世紀シェイクスピア #05 リア王)	Released: April 24, 2009; Label: Avex Trax; Format: DVD	134	
Mirai Seiki Shakespeare #06 The Tempest (未来世紀シェイクスピア #06 テンペスト)	Released: April 27, 2009; Label: Avex Trax; Format: DVD	136	
Nihikime no Dojō: Daiikkan (二匹目のどじょう -第一巻-)	Released: June 23, 2010; Label: Avex Trax; Format: DVD	74	
Nihikime no Dojō: Dainikan (二匹目のどじょう -第二巻-)	Released: July 14, 2010; Label: Avex Trax; Format: DVD	73	
Nihikime no Dojō: Daisankan (二匹目のどじょう -第三巻-)	Released: August 4, 2010; Label: Avex Trax; Format: DVD	57	
AAA Party Aki no Daiundoukai Tour in Shizuoka 2010.9.25–9.26 (AAA Party 秋の大運動会ツアー in 静岡 2010.9.25〜9.26)	Released: January 12, 2011; Label: Avex Trax; Format: DVD	—	
