= AAA 10th Anniversary Best =

Studio album by AAA
- Released: September 16, 2015
- Recorded: 2015
- Genre: J-pop
- Length: 169:50 (3CD)
- Language: Japanese
- Label: Avex Trax

AAA chronology
Gold Symphony (2014)	AAA 10th Anniversary Best (2015)	Way of Glory (2017)

Singles from AAA 10th Anniversary Best (2015 Singles)
- 1. "I'll Be There" Released: January 28, 2015; 2. "Lil' Infinity" Released: February 25, 2015; 3. "Boku no Yuutsu to Fukigen na Kanojo" Released: March 25, 2015; 4. "Game Over?" Released: April 29, 2015; 5. "Ashita no Hikari" Released: May 27, 2015; 6. "Flavor of Kiss" Released: June 24, 2015; 7. "Lover" Released: July 29, 2015; 8. "Aishiteru no ni, Aisenai" Released: September 16, 2015

AAA 10th Anniversary Best is the tenth studio album by Japanese music group AAA, released on September 16, 2015 alongside their eighth single of 2015 "Aishiteru no ni, Aisenai". The album is divided into three separate discs: the first two discs are a greatest hits compilation of hits songs from debut to 2014, while the third disc consists of new material released in 2015.

Soon after release the album rose to the top of Oricon's daily album rankings, also claiming the top spot on the proceeding 28 September 2015 weekly Oricon Albums Chart.

The album was released in light of commemorating AAA's tenth anniversary. During the first seven months of 2015, AAA released a single per month from January to July, which respectively became the first seven tracks of disc 3.

== Track listing ==
CD 1
No.	Title	Length
1.	"Blood on Fire"	4:27
2.	"Hurricane Lily, Boston Mary (ハリケーン・リリ、ボストン・マリ)"	6:17
3.	"Winter Lander!!"	4:12
4.	"Get Chu! (Get チュー!)"	3:50
5.	"Kuchibiru Kara Romantica (The Romance of Your Lips) (唇からロマンチカ)"	3:43
6.	"Sunshine"	3:55
7.	"Mirage"	3:09
8.	"Music!!!"	5:00
9.	"Horizon"	3:55
10.	"Break Down"	4:47
11.	"Heart and Soul"	4:21
12.	"Believe Own Way"	5:10
Total length:		52:46

CD 2
No.	Title	Length
1.	"Aitai Riyuu (To Meet With a Reason) (逢いたい理由)"	4:34
2.	"Makenai Kokoro (Undefeated Heart) (負けない心)"	4:20
3.	"Paradise"	4:57
4.	"Call"	4:17
5.	"Charge & Go!"	6:22
6.	"Still Love You"	5:19
7.	"777 (We Can Sing a Song!)"	4:58
8.	"Niji (Rainbow) (虹)"	4:55
9.	"Party It Up"	3:53
10.	"Love Is in the Air"	4:31
11.	"Koi Oto to Amazora (Rainy Skies and Love Sound) (恋音と雨空)"	5:16
12.	"Wake Up!"	3:43
13.	"Kaze ni Kaoru Natsu no Kioku (Memory of Summer Fragrant in the Wind) (風に薫る夏の記憶)"	5:05
14.	"Sayonara no Mae ni (Before Goodbye) (さよならの前に)"	5:20
15.	"Next Stage"	4:15
Total length:		71:45

CD 3
No.	Title	Music	Length
1.	"I'll Be There"	M.I, Shun Kusakawa, Kohei Yokono/ lyrics: Mio Aoyama	3:28
2.	"Lil' Infinity"	Toru Watanabe/ lyrics: Komatsu Rena	5:26
3.	"Boku no Yuutsu to Fukigen na Kanojo (My Melancholy and Sullen Girlfriend) (ぼくの憂鬱と不機嫌な彼女)"	Maruyama Mayuko/ lyrics: Kenn Kato	5:20
4.	"Game Over?"	Tomoya Kinoshita/ lyrics: leonn	3:40
5.	"Ashita no Hikari (Light of Tomorrow) (アシタノヒカリ)"	Maruyama Mayuko/ lyrics: Mizoguchi Takanori	3:42
6.	"Flavor of Kiss"	SiZK, Stephen McNair/ lyrics: Mizoguchi Takanori	4:27
7.	"Lover"	Miss-art, APAZZI/ lyrics: Miss-art	4:49
8.	"Distance"	Harada Yuichi, Hasegawa Akira Futoshi/ lyrics: Komatsu Rena	3:35
9.	"Story"	Maruyama Mayuko/ lyrics: Mizoguchi Takanori	5:52
10.	"Aishiteru no ni, Aisenai (Even Though I Love You, I Can't) (愛してるのに、愛せない)"	ArmySlick, Jam9/ lyrics: KAJI KATSURA	5:00
Total length:			45:19

All rap lyrics by Mitsuhiro Hidaka (Sky-Hi).

DVD content (2CD+DVD and 3CD+DVD+GOODs editions)
No.	Title	Length
1.	"Mirage" (music video)
2.	"Music!!!" (music video)
3.	"Break Down" (music video)
4.	"Heart and Soul" (music video)
5.	"Aitai Riyuu (To Meet With a Reason) (逢いたい理由)" (music video)
6.	"Makenai Kokoro (Undefeated Heart) (負けない心)" (music video)
7.	"Call" (music video)
8.	"Charge & Go!" (music video)
9.	"777 (We Can Sing a Song!)" (music video)
10.	"Party It Up" (music video)
11.	"Koi Oto to Amazora (Rainy Skies and Love Sound) (恋音と雨空)" (music video)
12.	"Show Time" (music video)
13.	"Wake up!" (music video)
14.	"Sayonara no Mae ni (Before Goodbye) (さよならの前に)" (music video)
15.	"Lil' Infinity" (music video)
16.	"Lover" (music video)
17.	"Aishiteru no ni, Aisenai (Even Though I Love You, I Can't) (愛してるのに、愛せない)" (music video)
18.	"Lover" (music video making)
19.	"Aishiteru no ni, Aisenai (Even Though I Love You, I Can't) (愛してるのに、愛せない)" (music video making)
20.	"AAA Asia Tour 2015: Attack All Around" (documentary video)

== Charts ==
Chart performance for AAA 10th Anniversary Best
Chart (2015)	Peak position
Oricon Daily Albums Chart	1
Oricon Weekly Albums Chart	1

== Cover images ==
AAA's 2015 single covers between January and July (inclusive); when put side by side, they spell out the group's backronym name "Attack All Around".
