= Takahiro Nishijima discography =

- Studio albums: 4
- Singles: 14
- Video albums: 2
- Music videos: 19
- Promotional singles: 6

The discography of Japanese singer Takahiro Nishijima, also known as Nissy, consists of four studio albums, two video albums, 14 singles and 19 music videos.

== Albums ==
=== Studio albums ===
List of studio albums, with selected chart positions
Title	Album details	Peak positions		Sales (Note: Sales provided by Oricon database and rounded to the nearest thousand.)
Title	Album details	JPN Oricon	JPN Hot	Sales
Hocus Pocus	Released: March 24, 2016; Label: Avex Trax; Formats: CD, (Note: Fan-club and mu-mo only release, ineligible to chart on Oricon.) digital download, streaming	—	9	—
Hocus Pocus 2	Released: December 24, 2017; Label: Avex; Formats: CD, digital download, streaming	—	16	JPN: 11,000 (Note: Digital sales figures for Hocus Pocus 2 (11,369 downloads).)
Hocus Pocus 3	Released: May 24, 2022; Label: Avex; Formats: CD, digital download, streaming	5	5	JPN: 33,274 (Phy.)
Hocus Pocus 4	Released: October 18, 2024; Label: Avex; Formats: CD, digital download, streaming	3	7	JPN: 32,019 (Phy.)

=== Compilation albums ===
List of compilation albums, with selected chart positions
Title	Album details	Peak chart positions		Sales	Certifications
Title	Album details	JPN Oricon	JPN Hot	Sales	Certifications
Nissy Entertainment 5th Anniversary Best	Released: February 4, 2019; Label: Avex Trax; Formats: CD, digital download, streaming	1	1	JPN: 92,000 (Note: Combined sales figures for Nissy Entertainment 5th Anniversary Best: 89,995 (physical sales) + 1,905 (digital sales).)	RIAJ: Gold

=== Live albums ===
List of live albums, with selected chart positions
Title	Album details	Peak positions	Sales
Title	Album details	JPN Hot	Sales
Nissy Entertainment 1st Live: Memorial Photo Book & Live Album	Released: May 24, 2017; Label: Avex Trax; Formats: CD, digital download, streaming	—	—
Nissy Entertainment "5th Anniversary" Best Dome Tour	Released: September 30, 2019; Label: Avex; Formats: digital download, streaming	8	

== Singles ==
List of singles, with selected chart positions
Title	Year	Peak position	Sales (Note: Sales figures for tracks are based on digital downloads.)	Certifications	Album
Title	Year	JPN Hot	Sales	Certifications	Album
"Dōshiyōka?"	2014	—	—		Hocus Pocus
"Wagamama"	2014	—	—		Hocus Pocus
"Gift"	2014	—	—		Hocus Pocus
"Dance Dance Dance"	2015	—	—		Hocus Pocus
"Never Stop"	2015	—	—		Hocus Pocus
"Playing with Fire"	2015	96	—		Hocus Pocus
"Sugar"	2016	87	—		Hocus Pocus 2
"Mada Kimi wa Shiranai My Prettiest Girl"	2016	8	—	RIAJ (digital): Gold	Hocus Pocus 2
"Hanacherie"	2017	1	—		Hocus Pocus 2
"17th Kiss" (Note: "17th Kiss", "Koisuhada", and "Ai Tears" were released as a Triple A-side from the single titled "OK?")	2017	69	—		Hocus Pocus 2
"Koisuhada"	2017	44	—		Hocus Pocus 2
"Ai Tears"	2017	54	—		Hocus Pocus 2
"Don't Let Me Go"	2017	20	—		Nissy Entertainment 5th Anniversary Best
"Toriko"	2018	9	JPN: 69,000		Nissy Entertainment 5th Anniversary Best
"Relax & Chill"	2018	24	JPN: 13,000		Nissy Entertainment 5th Anniversary Best
"NA"	2019	9			Non-album singles
"Oyasumi"	2019	24			Non-album singles
"I Need You"	2022	74			Non-album singles
"Stormy" (with Sky-Hi)	2024	24			Non-album singles
"Sōshiyōka"	2024	58			Non-album singles
"—" denotes items which did not chart.

=== Promotional singles ===
List of promotional singles, with selected chart positions
Title	Year	Peak	Sales	Album
Title	Year	JPN Hot	Sales	Album
"Nothing's Gonna Change My Love for You" (with Nick Carter)	2016	86	—	All American
"Happening"	2016	7	—	Hocus Pocus 2
"Bijo to Yajuu" (with Misako Uno)	2017	31	—	Thank You Disney
"Don't Let Me Go"	2017	20	—	Hocus Pocus 2
"The Eternal Live"	2017	30	JPN: 11,000	Hocus Pocus 2
"The Days"	2017	34	JPN: 5,000	Hocus Pocus 2
"Addicted"	2019	43	JPN: 6,000	Nissy Entertainment 5th Anniversary Best
"Affinity"	2019	45	JPN: 7,000	non-album single
"—" denotes items which did not chart.

== Other charted songs ==
List of other charted songs, with selected chart positions
Title	Year	Peak	Album
Title	Year	JPN Hot	Album
"Beauty and the Beast" (with Misako Uno)	2017	70	non-album song

== Videography ==
=== Video albums ===
List of video albums, with selected chart positions and certifications
Title	Album details	Peak positions		Sales	Certifications
Title	Album details	JPN DVD	JPN Blu-ray	Sales	Certifications
Nissy Entertainment 1st Live	Released: May 24, 2017; Label: Avex Trax; Formats: DVD, Blu-ray	—			
Nissy Entertainment 2nd Live: Final in Tokyo Dome	Released: December 24, 2018; Label: Avex Trax; Formats: DVD, Blu-ray	1	1	JPN: 91,000	RIAJ: Gold
Nissy Entertainment "5th Anniversary" Best Dome Tour	Released: September 30, 2019; Label: Avex; Formats: DVD, Blu-ray	1	1		

=== Music videos ===
Title	Year	Director
"Doushiyouka?"	2013	Ippei Morita
"Wagamama"	2013	Hiroko Ishizuchi
"Gift"	2014	Nozomi Tanaka
"Dance Dance Dance"	2015	Ippei Morita
"Never Stop"	2015	Ippei Morita
"Playing with Fire"	2015	Toshiro Sonoda
"Sugar"	2016	Toshiro Sonoda
"Mada Kimi wa Shiranai My Prettiest Girl"	2016	Toshiro Sonoda
"Happening"	2016	Toshiro Sonoda
"Hanacherie"	2017	Takahiro Miki; Natsuki Seta
"17th Kiss"	2017	Takahiro Nishijima; Toshiro Sonoda
"Ai Tears"	2017	Takahiro Nishijima; Toshiro Sonoda
"Koisuhada"	2017	Toshiro Sonoda
"Don't Let Me Go"	2017	Toshiro Sonoda
"The Eternal Live"	2017	Toshiro Sonoda
"The Days"	2017	Toshiro Sonoda
"Love Gun"	2018	Toshiro Sonoda
"Toriko"	2018	—
"Relax & Chill"	2018	—
"Addicted"	2019	—
"Affinity"	2019	—
"NA"	2019	Tomoo Noda
"Oyasumi"	2019	—

== See also ==
- AAA discography
