= Eighth Wonder (album) =

Studio album by AAA
- Released: September 18, 2013
- Recorded: 2012–13
- Genre: J-pop
- Length: 76:32
- Language: Japanese
- Label: Avex Trax
- Producer: Masato Max Matsuura

AAA chronology
777: Triple Seven (2012)	Eighth Wonder (2013)	Gold Symphony (2014)

Singles from Eighth Wonder
- 1. "Niji" Released: October 31, 2012; 2. "Miss you/Hohoemi No Saku Basho" Released: January 23, 2013; 3. "Party It Up" Released: March 13, 2013; 4. "Love Is In The Air" Released: June 26, 2013; 5. "Koi Oto to Amazora" Released: September 4, 2013

Eighth Wonder is the eighth studio album by Japanese music group AAA, released on September 18, 2013. The album contains five singles that were previously released —"Niji", "Miss you/Hohoemi No Saku Basho", "Party It Up", "Love Is In The Air" and "Koi Oto to Amazora"— all of which made the top 10 on the Oricon weekly singles chart.

Eighth Wonder debuted at the number one spot on the Oricon weekly album chart, selling over 46,000 copies in its first week. The album is AAA's first studio album to achieve number one on the weekly charts, and second album overall, two years after their compilation album #AAABEST.

== Release ==
Eighth Wonder is AAA's eighth album, released approximately 1 year since their previous album 777: Triple Seven. It is the first studio album by the group to contain 2 CDs. Disc 1 contains a total of 10 tracks, with only 1 track being new. Disc 2 contains a total of 6 tracks, composed of 4 new member duets, and 2 bonus tracks.

Group member Chiaki Ito explained the reason behind splitting the album into 2 CDs. She cited the flow of the tracks on the first disc as being too lovely, and thus the group decided to treasure that arrangement of tracks and put the rest of the tracks on a second disc.

The album was released on September 18, 2013, in five editions: a 2 CD-only edition which includes all tracks; a 2 CD and DVD limited edition, which contains all tracks as well as all DVD contents; a 2 CD and DVD first press limited edition which contains the same as the 2 CD and DVD limited edition, but comes with an AAA original lunch bag; a Playbutton edition which is a portable media player with pre-installed music activated by pressing its buttons; and a Music Card edition (in 7 designs) enabling digital download of the Disc 1's tracks which is sold only at tour venues.

== Promotion ==
Prior to release, the new songs on Eighth Wonder were being performed at the group's 2013 tour of the same title, since the opening leg in April. These songs were also cut into short versions, joined in a medley as a special preview, and released on AAA's 37th single "Love Is In The Air" in June.

The singles contained in the album were all released prior. "Niji" was released as the first single on October 31, 2012. It peaked at number three on the Oricon weekly singles chart and sold over 46,400 copies in Japan. The second single "Miss you/Hohoemi no Saku Basho" was released on January 23, 2013, which peaked at number three on the weekly Oricon singles chart, selling over 46,100 copies in Japan. On March 13, "Party It Up" was the third single released from the album. It peaked at number seven on the weekly Oricon singles chart and sold over 34,100 copies in Japan. On June 26, the fourth single "Love Is In The Air" was released. It peaked at number three on the weekly Oricon singles chart and sold over 49,200 copies in Japan. The fifth and final single "Koi Oto to Amazora" was released on September 4 and also peaked at number three on the Oricon weekly singles charts, and sold over 37,700 copies in Japan.

AAA held a release event for Eighth Wonder on September 8, 2013, at Tokyo Dome City's LaQua Garden Stage in Tokyo, Japan. Members Takahiro Nishijima, Misako Uno, and Naoya Urata were there to talk about the album, and people who had preordered the album were entitled to a high five with the members.

The group also held a special Niconico live streaming on September 19, to commemorate the release of the album. The stream included listening to the album's tracks and the appearance of members Mitsuhiro Hidaka, Shinjiro Atae, Shuta Sueyoshi and Chiaki Ito.

== Track listing ==
Disc 1
No.	Title	Lyrics	Music	Length
1.	"Eighth Wonder (Album Version)"	Kenn Kato, Mitsuhiro Hidaka	Daisuke Suzuki	6:00
2.	"Party It Up"	Musoh, Hidaka	Gwen, Stephen McNair	3:53
3.	"I Know You Know"	Bounceback, Hayato Kimura, DJ Another, Hidaka	DJ Another	3:52
4.	"Alive"	Chie Sawaguchi, Hidaka	Gwen, Stephen McNair	4:52
5.	"Love Is In The Air"	Musoh, Hidaka	Star Guitar, Musoh	4:35
6.	"Koi Oto to Amazora (with Intro) (恋音と雨空 (with Intro))"	Yosuke Okamura, Hidaka	Okamura	5:28
7.	"Miss you"	Musoh, Hidaka	Sizk from Star Guitar, Musoh	4:53
8.	"Hohoemi no Saku Basho (ほほえみの咲く場所)"	Yusuke Toriumi, Hidaka	Tetsuya Komuro	4:17
9.	"Good day"	Leonn, Hidaka	Kazuhito Kikuchi	5:32
10.	"Niji (虹)"	Greeeen	Greeeen	4:56

Disc 2
No.	Title	Lyrics	Music	Length
1.	"Memory Lane" (Naoya Urata & Shinjiro Atae duet)	Kenji Kabashima	Kabashima, Kosekibeatz	5:06
2.	"Trap" (Misako Uno & Chiaki Ito duet)	Kamikaoru, Hidaka	Bounceback	3:23
3.	"Believe" (Mitsuhiro Hidaka & Shuta Sueyoshi duet)	Miss-art, Hidaka	Sizk, Miss-art	4:37
4.	"Drama" (Takahiro Nishijima & Misako Uno duet)	Hidaka	Sizk, Musoh	4:31
5.	"Eighth Wonder (Wonder Land Remix)" (bonus track)	Kato, Hidaka	Suzuki	5:21
6.	"Koi Oto to Amazora (Acoustic Version) (恋音と雨空 (Acoustic Version))" (bonus track)	Okamura, Hidaka	Okamura	5:16

DVD Contents for 2CD+DVD+Original Lunch Bag and 2CD+DVD editions
No.	Title	Length
1.	"Niji (虹)" (music video)
2.	"Miss you" (music video)
3.	"Party It Up" (music video)
4.	"Love Is In The Air" (music video)
5.	"Koi Oto to Amazora (恋音と雨空)" (music video)
6.	"Miss you" (music video making)
7.	"Party It Up" (music video making)
8.	"Love Is In The Air" (music video making)
9.	"Koi Oto to Amazora (恋音と雨空)" (music video making)
10.	"Miss you" (music video offshoot)
11.	"Party It Up" (music video offshoot)
12.	"Love Is In The Air" (music video making)
13.	"Party It Up" (silhouette version)

== Charts ==
Chart (2013)	Peak position
Oricon Weekly Albums Chart	1
Billboard Japan Top Albums	1
