= The Choice Is Yours =

The Choice Is Yours or Choice Is Yours may refer to:

- 1980 – The Choice Is Yours, an album by punk rock band The Members
- "The Choice Is Yours (Revisited)", a song by hip hop group Black Sheep
- Choice Is Yours (AAA album), the third mini album by the Japanese entertainers AAA
- The Choice is Yours, a high school open enrollment program coordinated by the Minnesota Department of Education
