= Attack (AAA album) =

Studio album by AAA
- Released: January 1, 2006
- Recorded: 2005
- Genre: J-pop
- Language: Japanese
- Label: Avex Trax
- Producer: Masato Max Matsuura

AAA chronology
Attack (2006)	Remix Attack (2006)

Singles from Attack
- 1. "Blood on Fire" Released: September 14, 2005; 2. "Friday Party" Released: October 05, 2005; 3. "Kirei na Sora" Released: November 16, 2005; 4. "DRAGON FIRE" Released: December 07, 2005

Attack is the first studio album by Japanese music group AAA. The album consists of a total 12 singles.

Attack was released on January 1, 2006 in the Avex Trax label in three editions: a CD and DVD edition, a CD-only edition, and a half album edition.

== Track listing ==
CD
No.	Title	Lyrics	Music	Length
1.	"Blood on Fire"	Sasaki Osamu	Watanabe Miki	4:26
2.	"Dragon Fire"	Akio Shimizu	Akio Shimizu	4:29
3.	"Welcome to This World"	Sotaro & KEN	Sotaro & KEN, H-Wonder	4:16
4.	"Taiyou (太陽)"	Takeshi Kawai	Takeshi Kawai	4:43
5.	"Kirei na Sora (きれいな空)"	Hara Hiroaki	Hara Hiroaki	4:37
6.	"Saikyou Babe (最強 Babe)"	motsu	face 2 fAKE	3:59
7.	"Get or Lose"	Mori Hiromi	Takeshi Hayashida	4:52
8.	"Deai no Chikara (出会いのチカラ)"	Kenn Kato	face 2 fAKE	4:57
9.	"Friday Party"	m.c.A.T	Akio Togashi	3:53
10.	"VIRGIN F"	motsu	Gotô Toshitsugu	4:22
11.	"Chikyuu ni Dakarete (地球に抱かれて)"	Panta	Satoshi Mamoru	4:19
12.	"Bokura no Te (ボクラノテ)"	Takumi Ishidas	Takumi Ishida	4:59

CD (Half Album)
No.	Title	Lyrics	Music	Length
1.	"Blood on Fire"	Sasaki Osamu	Watanabe Miki	4:26
2.	"Dragon Fire"	Akio Shimizu	Akio Shimizu	4:29
3.	"Welcome to This World"	Sotaro & KEN	Sotaro & KEN, H-Wonder	4:16
4.	"Kirei na Sora (きれいな空)"	Hara Hiroaki	Hara Hiroaki	4:37
5.	"Friday Party"	m.c.A.T	Akio Togashi	3:53
6.	"Chikyuu ni Dakarete (地球に抱かれて)"	Panta	Satoshi Mamoru	4:19

DVD "Ashita wa Friday Party!! Mini Live on 2005.11.03"
No.	Title	Length
1.	"Welcome to This World"
2.	"CRAZY GONNA CRAZY"
3.	"Kirei na Sora (きれいな空)"
4.	"Friday Party"
5.	"Chikyuu ni Dakarete (地球に抱かれて)"

== Charts ==
Attack spent 11 weeks on the Japan Oricon Charts, peaking at number 16.
