= Gold Symphony =

Studio album by AAA
- Released: October 1, 2014
- Recorded: 2014
- Genre: J-pop
- Length: 49:29 (CD)
- Language: Japanese
- Label: Avex Trax

AAA chronology
Eighth Wonder (2013)	Gold Symphony (2014)	AAA 10th Anniversary Best (2015)

Singles from Gold Symphony
- 1. "Love" Released: February 26, 2014; 2. "Show Time" Released: March 26, 2014; 3. "HANDs" Released: April 16, 2014; 4. "Wake up!" Released: July 2, 2014; 5. "Sayonara no Mae ni" Released: September 17, 2014

Gold Symphony is the ninth studio album by Japanese music group AAA, released on October 1, 2014. The album includes four singles that were previously released — "Love", "Show Time" (where only the B-side "Circle" was repackaged, not the title track "Show Time" itself), "Wake up!" and "Sayonara no Mae ni", which had all peaked inside the top 5 of the Oricon weekly singles chart.

== Track listing ==
CD 1
No.	Title	Music	Length
1.	"Intro -GOLD SYMPHONY-"		2:31
2.	"Next Stage (TV Size Ver.) (Next Stage(オリジナル))"	Kenji Kabashima/Sugaya Bros.	4:14
3.	"SHOUT & SHAKE"	Kohei Yokono/M.I	4:01
4.	"CIRCLE"	Elizabeth & Jihoo	4:50
5.	"HANDs"	Ryoku Gonohe	5:24
6.	"Love"	Kunio Tago	5:33
7.	"V.O.L (Voice of Love)"	Chris Hardin	3:51
8.	"autumn orange"	APAZZI	5:01
9.	"Kaze ni Kaoru Natsu no Kioku (風に薫る夏の記憶)"	Katsumi Onishi	5:06
10.	"Sayonara no Mae ni (さよならの前に)"	Mayuko Maruyama	5:20
11.	"Wake up!"	Hiroshi Hibino	3:44
Total length:			49:29

DVD Contents for CD+DVD and CD+DVD+GOODs editions
No.	Title	Length
1.	"Love" (music video)	5:37
2.	"Wake up!" (music video)	4:20
3.	"Kaze ni Kaoru Natsu no Kioku (風に薫る夏の記憶)" (music video)	5:06
4.	"Sayonara no Mae ni (さよならの前に)" (music video)	5:37
5.	"Love" (music video making)	13:08
6.	"Wake up!" (music video making)	13:33
7.	"Sayonara no Mae ni (さよならの前に)" (music video making *extended version*)	18:20
Total length:		65:43

== Charts ==
Chart (2014)	Peak position
Oricon Weekly Albums Chart	1
