= 777: Triple Seven =

Studio album by AAA
- Released: August 22, 2012
- Recorded: 2011–12
- Genre: J-pop
- Length: 65:13
- Language: Japanese
- Label: Avex Trax

AAA chronology
Buzz Communication (2011)	777: Triple Seven (2012)	Eighth Wonder (2013)

Singles from 777: Triple Seven
- 1. "Charge & Go! / Lights" Released: November 16, 2011; 2. "Sailing" Released: February 22, 2012; 3. "Still Love You" Released: May 16, 2012; 4. "777 (We Can Sing a Song!)" Released: July 25, 2012

777: Triple Seven (stylized 777 ～TRIPLE SEVEN～) is the seventh studio album by Japanese music group AAA. The album spawned four singles prior to its release—"Charge & Go! / Lights", "Sailing", "Still Love You", and "777 (We Can Sing a Song!)"—which all charted within the top five spots of the Oricon weekly singles chart.

777: Triple Seven was released on August 22, 2012, in six editions: a CD-only edition, a CD and two-DVD limited edition, a CD and Blu-ray limited edition, a CD and DVD edition, a Playbutton edition, and a two-CD Mu-Mo edition. The album debuted at number two on the Oricon weekly albums chart and the Billboard Japan Top Albums.

== Release and promotion ==
"Charge & Go! / Lights" was released as the first single on July 27, 2011. It peaked at number five on the Oricon weekly singles chart and sold over 52,400 copies in Japan.^{a} The second single "Sailing" was released on February 22, 2012, which peaked at number four on the weekly Oricon singles chart, selling over 44,500 copies.^{b} On May 16, "Still Love You" was the third single released from the album. It peaked at number three on the weekly Oricon singles chart and sold over 55,000 copies in Japan.^{c} The fourth and final single "777 (We Can Sing a Song!)" was released on July 25 and debuted at number four on the Oricon weekly singles charts, and went on to sell over 39,400 copies in Japan.^{d}

777: Triple Seven was released on August 22, 2012, in six editions: a CD-only edition which includes the bonus track "Special Summer Medley (Sunshine - No End Summer - Summer Revolution)"; a CD and DVD limited edition, which includes the music videos for "Charge & Go!", "Sailing", "Still Love You", "777 (We Can Sing a Song!)", and "I$M", a music video offshoot of "777 (We Can Sing a Song!)", and the music video making of "I$M"; a CD and two-DVD limited edition which includes the CD and DVD limited edition content, and a second disc which contains the documentary film The Road to AAA Tour 2012 777: Triple Seven; a CD and Blu-ray limited edition which includes the DVD limited edition and the two-DVD limited edition content on one Blu-ray Disc; a Playbutton edition which includes a portable media player with pre-installed music activated by pressing its buttons; and a two-CD Mu-Mo edition which includes seasons 13–21 of Think About AAA 6th Anniversary.

AAA held a release event for 777: Triple Seven on August 23, 2012, in Toyosu Station' Lalaport Toyosu in Tokyo, Japan. The group is scheduled to hold a release for the album on October 5 in Taiwan.

== Chart performance ==
777: Triple Seven debuted at number two on the Oricon weekly albums chart, selling 54,040 copies in its first week. On the Billboard Japan Top Albums, 777: Triple Seven also debuted at number two.

== Track listing ==
All editions:
No.	Title	Lyrics	Music	Length
1.	"777 Opening"		Hirofumi Hibino, Shingo Yasumoto	1:51
2.	"Charge & Go!"	Kenn Kato, Mitsuhiro Hidaka	Tetsuya Komuro	6:22
3.	"777 (We Can Sing a Song!)"	Hidaka, Leonn	Hibino	5:02
4.	"Sailing"	Komuro, Hidaka	Komuro	4:29
5.	"Perfect"	Hidaka, Shirose, Noa	Shimada, Shirose, Ken Matsuoka	3:46
6.	"Lights"	Yusuke Toriumi, Hidaka	Bounceback	4:59
7.	"Last Love"	Gashima, Shirose, Nikki	Shimada, Shirose, Matsuoka, Nikki	3:32
8.	"I$M"	Goro Matsui, Kato, Bounceback, Kenko-p, Leonn, Kyasu Morizuki, Hidaka	Kazuyuki Akita	5:23
9.	"Sorry, I..."	Katsura, Hidaka	Cube Juice	3:40
10.	"Still Love You"	Katsura, Hidaka	Shirose, Heroism, DJ First	5:24
11.	"Wishes"	Shinjiroh Inoue	Inoue	5:52
12.	"Thank You (39 ver.)"	Kyasu Morizuki, Hidaka	Komuro	5:53
13.	"We Are! (ウィーアー!)" (bonus track)	Shoko Fujibayashi	Kohei Tanaka	4:08
14.	"Special Summer Medley (Sunshine - No End Summer - Summer Revolution)" (CD-only, Mu-Mo, and Playbutton editions bonus track)			4:52
Total length:				1:05:13

CD+DVD, CD+2DVD, Blu-ray editions:
No.	Title	Length
1.	"Charge & Go!" (music video)
2.	"Sailing" (music video)
3.	"Still Love You" (music video)
4.	"I$M" (music video)
5.	"I$M" (music video)
6.	"777 (We Can Sing a Song!)" (music video offshoot)
7.	"I$M" (music video making)
8.	"Documentary film The Road to AAA Tour 2012 777: Triple Seven" (CD+2DVD edition, disc 3; Blu-ray edition, disc 2 track 8)

Mu-Mo edition:
No.	Title	Length
1.	"Think about AAA 6th Anniversary: Season 13"
2.	"Think about AAA 6th Anniversary: Season 14"
3.	"Think about AAA 6th Anniversary: Season 15"
4.	"Think about AAA 6th Anniversary: Season 16"
5.	"Think about AAA 6th Anniversary: Season 17"
6.	"Think about AAA 6th Anniversary: Season 18"
7.	"Think about AAA 6th Anniversary: Season 19"
8.	"Think about AAA 6th Anniversary: Season 20"
9.	"Think about AAA 6th Anniversary: Season 21"

== Charts ==
Chart (2012)	Peak position
Billboard Japan Top Albums	2
Oricon Weekly Albums Chart	2

== Notes ==
- ^Note a: The sales figure of 52,400 copies is taken from accumulating the sales of the single during its first two charting weeks on the Oricon weekly singles chart (48,912, 3,564).
- ^Note b: The sales figure of 45,600 copies is taken from accumulating the sales of the single during its first two charting weeks on the Oricon weekly chart (42,056, 3,634).
- ^Note c: The sales figure of 55,000 copies is taken from accumulating the sales of the single during its first three charting weeks on the Oricon weekly chart (48,284, 4,946, 2,129).
- ^Note d: The sales figure of 39,400 copies is taken from accumulating the sales of the single during its first two charting weeks on the Oricon weekly chart (35,806, 3,640).
