= Sailing (AAA song) =

- CD-only cover

Single by AAA

from the album 777: Triple Seven
- Released: February 22, 2012
- Recorded: 2012
- Genre: J-pop
- Length: 4:29
- Label: Avex Trax
- Songwriters: Mitsuhiro Hidaka, Tetsuya Komuro

AAA singles chronology
"Charge & Go! / Lights" (2011)	"Sailing" (2012)	"Still Love You" (2012)

"Sailing" (stylized as "SAILING") is a song by Japanese pop group AAA. It is their 31st single and is included in the group's seventh studio album 777: Triple Seven. The song was written by Mitsuhiro Hidaka and Tetsuya Komuro. The single was released in Japan on February 22, 2012, under Avex Trax in four editions: a CD-only edition, a CD and DVD A edition, a CD and DVD B edition, and a Mu-Mo edition. "Sailing" debuted at number four on the weekly Oricon singles chart. The single charted for six weeks and went on to sell over 45,600 copies in Japan.

== Composition ==
"Sailing" was written by Mitsuhiro Hidaka and Tetsuya Komuro, composed by Komuro, and arranged by ArmySlick. "Wishes" was written and composed by Shinjiroh Inoue, and arranged by Sin.

== Release and promotion ==
"Sailing" was released on February 22, 2012, in four editions: a CD-only edition, which includes "Call (DJ OMKT & MJ Remix)"; a CD and DVD A edition, which includes the music video for the song, the first part of the music video making, and the first part of the AAA 6th Anniversary Tour; a CD and DVD B edition, which includes the second part of the music video making and the second part of the AAA 6th Anniversary Tour; a Mu-Mo edition, which includes the Think About AAA 6th Anniversary clips from seasons 15, 16, and 17 in editions A, B, and C, respectively. The song was used in the "7 Days @ Home" television advertisements for hypermarket Ito-Yokado.

== Chart performance ==
"Sailing" debuted at number four on the weekly Oricon singles charts, selling 42,056 copies in its first week. It went on to chart for six weeks and sold over 45,600 copies in Japan.^{a} On the issue dated March 5, 2012, the song debuted at number eight on the Billboard Japan Hot 100. On the Recording Industry Association of Japan (RIAJ) Digital Track Chart, the song debuted at number 20.

== Track listing ==
CD-only
No.	Title	Lyrics	Music	Length
1.	"Sailing"	Mitsuhiro Hidaka, Tetsuya Komuro	Komuro	4:29
2.	"Wishes"	Shinjiroh Inoue	Inoue	5:52
3.	"Call (DJ OMKT & MJ Remix)"	Kenn Kato, Hidaka	Masanori Takumi, DJ OMKT, MJ	5:58
4.	"Sailing (Instrumental)"		Komuro	4:25
5.	"Wishes (Instrumental)"		Inoue	5:53

CD and DVD A
No.	Title	Length
1.	"Sailing" (music video)
2.	"Sailing" (music video making part 1)
3.	"AAA 6th Anniversary Tour part 1"

CD and DVD B
No.	Title	Length
1.	"Sailing" (music video making part 2)
2.	"AAA 6th Anniversary Tour part 2"

Mu-Mo
No.	Title	Lyrics	Music	Length
1.	"Sailing"	Hidaka, Komuro	Komuro	4:29
2.	"Wishes"			5:52
3.	"Think About AAA 6th Anniversary: Season 15" (Mu-Mo A Edition only)
4.	"Think About AAA 6th Anniversary: Season 16" (Mu-Mo B Edition only)
5.	"Think About AAA 6th Anniversary: Season 17" (Mu-Mo C Edition only)

== Chart history ==
Chart (2012)	Peak position
Billboard Japan Hot 100	8
Oricon Weekly Chart	4
RIAJ Digital Track Chart	20

== Notes ==
- ^Note a: The sales figure of 45,600 copies is taken from accumulating the sales of the single during its first two charting weeks on the Oricon weekly chart (42,056, 3,634).
