= Shuta Sueyoshi =

Japanese singer, actor and dancer (born 1986)

- 末吉 秀太
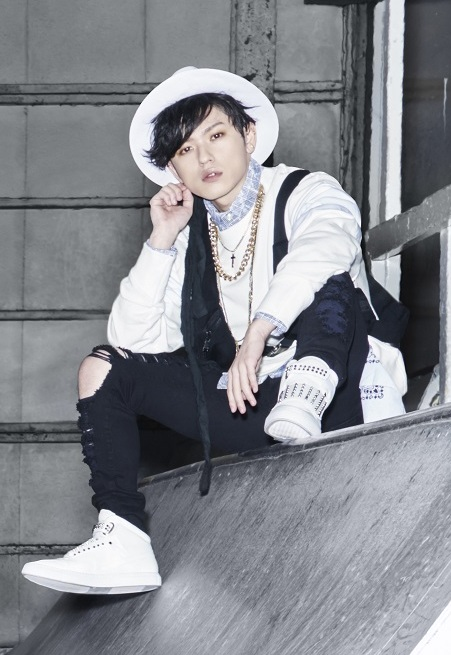
- Sueyoshi in 2015
- Born: December 11, 1986 (age 39)
- Occupations: Singer; actor
- Years active: 2005-present
- Agent: Avex Entertainment
- Musical career
- Genre: J-pop
- Instrument: Vocals
- Label: Avex Trax
- Formerly of: AAA

Shuta Sueyoshi (末吉 秀太, Sueyoshi Shūta; born December 11, 1986) is a Japanese singer, actor and dancer who is a member of the group AAA.

He is from Sasebo, Nagasaki Prefecture.

== Discography ==
=== Albums ===
Title	Details	Peak positions
Title	Details	Oricon Albums Chart
Jack in the Box	Released: January 3, 2018; Label: Avex Trax; Formats: CD, digital download	9
Wonder Hack	Released: January 16, 2019; Label: Avex Trax; Formats: CD, digital download	7
Pret-a-Porter	Released: February 12, 2020; Label: Avex Trax; Formats: CD, digital download	12
Bifrost	Released: August 14, 2024; Label: Avex Trax; Formats: CD, digital download	25

=== Singles ===
Title	Year	Album
"Switch"	2017	Jack in the Box
"Sad Story"	2017	Jack in the Box
"Toricago" (to.ri.ca.go)	2017	Jack in the Box
"Byoushin Re:time"	2017	Jack in the Box
"Run Away"	2017	Jack in the Box
"Over "Quartzer"" (featuring ISSA)	2018	Non-album single
"I'm Your Owner"	2019	Wonder Hack

=== Guest appearances ===
Title	Year	Other artist(s)	Album
"You Love Me"	2015	NIHA-C	BULLMOOSE presents Floatin' Lab II
"BIRI x BIRI"	2017	Takanori Nishikawa	none
"Kimi no Koto ga Suki Dattanda"	2017	Beni, HAN-KUN, Spicy Chocolate	Spicy Chocolate Best of Love Songs
"Kimi no Koto ga Suki Dattanda" (Lovers Remix)	2018	Beni, HAN-KUN, Spicy Chocolate	none

== Filmography ==
=== TV series ===
Year	Title	Role	Network	Notes
2006	Karera no Umi 8		TV Kumamoto (TKU), Fuji Television, ex	Short Drama
2008	Mirai Seiki Shakespeare		Kansai TV (KTV)	
2011	Tousouchu 18 ～ run for money ～ Target Hunters Edition		Fuji Television	

=== Theater plays ===
Year	Title	Network	Notes
2009	starring at musical "Love Musical"		
2013	Shida no Mure 3rd Minato no Onna Kashu Edition		

=== Miscellaneous ===
Year	Title	Network	Notes
2010	Bokura no Natsu!!		Performance guide on Dream5 Single
2012	Dance Holic 1st anniversary		event at shibuya harlem
2014	Shuta Sueyoshi SPECIAL DANCE NUMBER		LIVE & DANCE fes at Yomiuri Land
