= Makenai Kokoro =

Single by AAA

from the album Buzz Communication
- B-side: "Day By Day"; "Wow War Tonight (Toki ni wa Okose yo Movement)"
- Released: August 18, 2010
- Genre: J-pop, Pop, J-Euro
- Length: 4:22
- Label: Avex Trax
- Songwriters: Kenn Kato, Mitsuhiro Hidaka, Tetsuya Komuro
- Producer: Max Matsuura

AAA singles chronology
"Aitai Riyū/Dream After Dream (Yume Kara Sameta Yume)" (2010)	"Makenai Kokoro" (2010)	"Paradise/Endless Fighters" (2010)

"Makenai Kokoro" (負けない心; "Undefeated Heart") is a single by Japanese dance pop band AAA, released on August 18, 2010. It is their second consecutive single produced by Tetsuya Komuro, after "Aitai Riyū/Dream After Dream (Yume Kara Sameta Yume)".

== Promotion ==
The single had two tie-ups: "Makenai Kokoro" was used as the theme song of the television drama Gakeppuchi no Eri: Kono Yo de Ichiban Daichi na 'Kane' no Hanashi, while "Day By Day" was used in commercials for Avex Artist Academy. Band member Takahiro Nishijima featured as an actor in the seventh episode of Gakeppuchi no Eri.

== Single contents ==
Six versions of the single exist: a CD only version, two DVD editions, and three Mu-Mo store exclusive versions. DVD edition A featured the music video for the song, while DVD edition B featured a documentary on the making of the music video for their previous single "Aitai Riyū."

All versions feature "Makenai Kokoro" and "Day By Day", while only the CD only version features the group's cover of H Jungle with T's 1995 number 1 single, "Wow War Tonight (Toki ni wa Okose yo Movement)". The Mu-Mo exclusive versions each feature one of three live talk tracks, where the band members discuss the time since their debut in 2005.

== Track listings ==
CD-only version track listing
No.	Title	Writer(s)	Arranger	Length
1.	"Makenai Kokoro"	Kenn Kato, Mitsuhiro Hidaka, Tetsuya Komuro	Ats-	4:22
2.	"Day By Day"	Komuro, Hidaka	Saito	4:33
3.	"Wow War Tonight (Toki ni wa Okose yo Movement)" (ＷＯＷ ＷＡＲ ＴＯＮＩＧＨＴ ～時には起こせよムーヴメント～ "Wow War Tonight (Time Awakens, Movement)", H Jungle with T cover.)	Komuro	Ats-	5:29
4.	"Makenai Kokoro (Instrumental)"	Kato, Hidaka, Komuro	Ats-	4:22
5.	"Day By Day (Instrumental)"	Komuro, Hidaka	Saito	4:31
Total length:				23:17

CD-DVD versions track listing
No.	Title	Writer(s)	Arranger	Length
1.	"Makenai Kokoro"	Kato, Hidaka, Komuro	Ats-	4:22
2.	"Day By Day"	Komuro, Hidaka	Saito	4:33
3.	"Makenai Kokoro (Instrumental)"	Kato, Hidaka, Komuro	Ats-	4:22
4.	"Day By Day (Instrumental)"	Komuro, Hidaka	Saito	4:31
Total length:				17:49

== Charts and sales ==
Chart (2010)	Peak position
Oricon weekly singles	3
Billboard Adult Contemporary Airplay	14
Billboard Japan Hot 100	5
RIAJ Digital Track Chart Top 100	10

=== Reported sales ===
Chart	Amount
Oricon physical sales	58,000

== Release history ==
Region	Date	Format
Japan	August 18, 2010	CD, rental CD, PC download
Japan	August 25, 2010	Cellphone digital download
