= Heartful =

Studio album by AAA
- Released: February 17, 2010
- Recorded: 2009–2010
- Genre: Eurobeat, pop, techno
- Label: Avex Trax
- Producer: Max Matsuura

AAA chronology
Departure (2009)	Heartful (2010)	Buzz Communication (2011)

Singles from Heartful
- 1. "Break Down/Break Your Name/Summer Revolution/" Released: July 29, 2009; 2. "Hide-away" Released: October 21, 2009; 3. "Heart and Soul" Released: January 27, 2010

Heartful is the fifth studio album by Japanese pop band AAA. It was released on February 17, 2010, by their label Avex Trax. Three singles were released to promote the album, "Break Down/Break Your Name/Summer Revolution/", "Hide-away", and "Heart and Soul".

== Singles ==
The first single released from the album was the triple A-side single, "Break Down/Summer Revolution/Say Your Name". It was released on July 29, 2009. The single charted at No. 3 on the Oricon single charts. The second single was "Hide-away", which was released October 21, 2009 and charted at No. 2. The third and final single from the album was "Heart and Soul", which peaked at No. 3.

== Track listing ==
No.	Title	Lyrics	Music	Length
1.	"Heartful" (♥ ハートフル)
2.	"Overdrive"	Kenn Kato, Mitsuhiro Hidaka	Bounceback
3.	"Break Down"	Leonn, Hidaka	Miki Fujisue
4.	"Brand New World" (sung by Naoya Urata, Mitsuhiro Hidaka, Shinjiro Atae and Chiaki Ito)	Hub, Hidaka	Takeshi Toriume
5.	"Rising Sun" (sung by Takahiro Nishijima, Shuta Sueyoshi, and Misako Uno)	Bounceback	Bounceback
6.	"Summer Revolution" (sung by Uno and Ito)	Leonn	Bounceback
7.	"As I Am" (sung by Uno)	Leonn	Hiroshi Hibino
8.	"One" (sung by Uno, Atae, Sueyoshi and Ito)	Leonn, Hidaka	Hibino
9.	"Get It On" (sung by Nishijima, Urata, Hidaka, Atae and Sueyoshi)	Gorō Matsui, Hidaka	Bounceback
10.	"Heart and Soul"	Leonn, Hidaka	Shinya Saito
11.	"Believe Own Way"	Hub, Hidaka	Daisuke Suzuki
12.	"Field"	Bounceback, Hidaka	Bounceback
13.	"Metamorphose"	Leonn, Hidaka	Bounceback
14.	"Hide-away"	Leonn, Hidaka	Mitsuru Igarashi

== Charts ==
Chart (2010)	Peak position
Japan Oricon Weekly Chart	3
