= Choice Is Yours (AAA EP) =

EP by AAA
- Released: June 18, 2008
- Genre: J-pop
- Label: avex trax

AAA chronology
Around (2007)	Choice Is Yours (2008)	Departure (2009)

Choice Is Yours is the third mini album by the Japanese entertainers AAA. It only features the male members of AAA. It was released on avex trax on June 18, 2008, in three different editions: CD, CD accompanied by a Live DVD and CD accompanied by DVD.

It charted at #10 on the Oricon album chart.

== CD track listing ==
1. Crash
2. Hasta la vista ~アスタ・ラ・ビスタ~
3. ZAPPER (Shuta Sueyoshi and Mitsuhiro Hidaka duet)
4. Crying Freeman (Shinjiro Atae solo)
5. BET
6. あきれるくらいわがままな自由 (Akirerukurai Wagamama na Jiyuu)

== DVD track listing ==
=== Live DVD ===
Winter Special Live~Otoko dakedato ... kounarimashita !~(2007/12/6 Club CITTA Kawasaki)Recorded

=== DVD ===
Winter Special Live~Otoko dakedato ... kounarimashita !~ at Club CITTA on December 6

1. Hasta la vista ~Asuta ra bisuta~
2. Soul Edge Boy
3. Crash
4. Akirerukurai Wagamama na Jiyuu
5. Chewing Gum
6. Saikyou Babe (Chibikko AAA version)
7. Get Chu! (Acoustic version)
8. Bomb A Head!
9. Saikyou Babe
10. -ENCORE-
11. No End Summer
12. BET
13. Winter lander! (AAA men's version)
