= Charge & Go! / Lights =

- CD-only cover

Single by AAA

from the album 777: Triple Seven
- Released: November 16, 2011
- Recorded: 2011
- Genre: J-pop
- Length: 6:22
- Label: Avex Trax
- Songwriters: Kenn Kato, Mitsuhiro Hidaka

AAA singles chronology
"Call / I4U" (2011)	"Charge & Go! / Lights" (2011)	"Sailing" (2012)

"Charge & Go! / Lights" (stylized as "Charge ▶ Go! / Lights") is the 30th single by Japanese pop group AAA. It is included in the group's seventh studio album 777: Triple Seven. "Charge & Go!" was written by Kenn Kato and Mitsuhiro Hidaka. The single was released in Japan on November 16, 2011, under Avex Trax in five editions: a CD-only edition, a CD and DVD A edition, a CD and DVD B edition, a box set edition, and a Mu-Mo edition. "Charge & Go! / Lights" debuted at number five on the weekly Oricon singles chart. The single charted for nine weeks and went on to sell over 52,400 copies in Japan.

== Composition ==
"Charge & Go!" was written by Kenn Kato and Mitsuhiro Hidaka, composed by Tetsuya Komuro, and arranged by ArmySlick. "Lights" was written by Yusuke Toriumi and Hidaka, composed by Bounceback, and arranged by Tohru Watanabe.

== Release and promotion ==
"Charge & Go! / Lights" was released on November 16, 2011, in five editions: a CD-only edition, which includes "6th Anniversary Sabi Medley", a medley of AAA's previous singles "Blood on Fire", "Champagne Gold", "Dragon Fire", "Metamorphose", "Jamboree!!", "That's Right", "Sunshine", and "Hurricane Riri, Boston Mari"; a CD and DVD A edition, which includes the music video for "Charge & Go!" and the first part of the music video making; a CD and DVD B edition, which includes the second part of the music video making; a CD and DVD A edition, which includes the music video for "Charge & Go!" and the first part of the music video making; a CD-only Mu-Mo edition; a Mu-Mo box set edition which includes the Think About AAA 6th Anniversary clips from seasons 13 and 14. "Charge & Go!" was used in television advertisements for Morinaga & Company's energy drink Weider in Jelly. At the end of 2011, a smartphone download version of the single was released.

== Chart performance ==
"Charge & Go! / Lights" debuted at number four on the weekly Oricon singles charts, selling 48,912 copies in its first week. It went on to chart for nine weeks and sold over 52,400 copies in Japan.^{a} On the issue dated March 5, 2012, "Charge & Go!" debuted at number 13 on the Billboard Japan Hot 100. On the Recording Industry Association of Japan (RIAJ) Digital Track Chart, "Charge & Go!" and "Lights" debuted at numbers 22 and 69, respectively.

== Track listing ==
CD-only
No.	Title	Lyrics	Music	Length
1.	"Charge & Go!"	Kenn Kato, Mitsuhiro Hidaka	Tetsuya Komuro	6:22
2.	"Lights"	Yusuke Toriumi, Hidaka	Bounceback	4:59
3.	"6th Anniversary Sabi Medley"			8:55
4.	"Charge & Go! (Instrumental)"		Komuro	6:21
5.	"Lights (Instrumental)"		Bounceback	5:00
Total length:				31:37

CD and DVD A
No.	Title	Length
1.	"Charge & Go!" (music video)
2.	"Charge & Go!" (music video making part 1)

CD and DVD B
No.	Title	Length
1.	"Charge & Go!" (music video making part 2)
2.	"Charge & Go!" (swing video)

Mu-Mo box set
No.	Title	Lyrics	Music	Length
1.	"Charge & Go!"	Kenn Kato, Mitsuhiro Hidaka	Tetsuya Komuro	6:22
2.	"Lights"	Yusuke Toriumi, Hidaka	Bounceback	4:59
3.	"Think About AAA 6th Anniversary: Season 13"
4.	"Think About AAA 6th Anniversary: Season 14"

== Chart history ==
Chart (2011)	Release	Peak position
Billboard Japan Hot 100	"Charge & Go!"	13
Oricon Weekly Singles Chart	"Charge & Go! / Lights"	5
RIAJ Digital Track Chart	"Charge & Go!"	22
RIAJ Digital Track Chart	"Lights"	69

== Notes ==
- ^Note a: The sales figure of 52,400 copies is taken from accumulating the sales of the single during its first two charting weeks on the Oricon weekly singles chart (48,912, 3,564).
