= Misako Uno =

Musical artist (born 1986)

- 宇野 実彩子
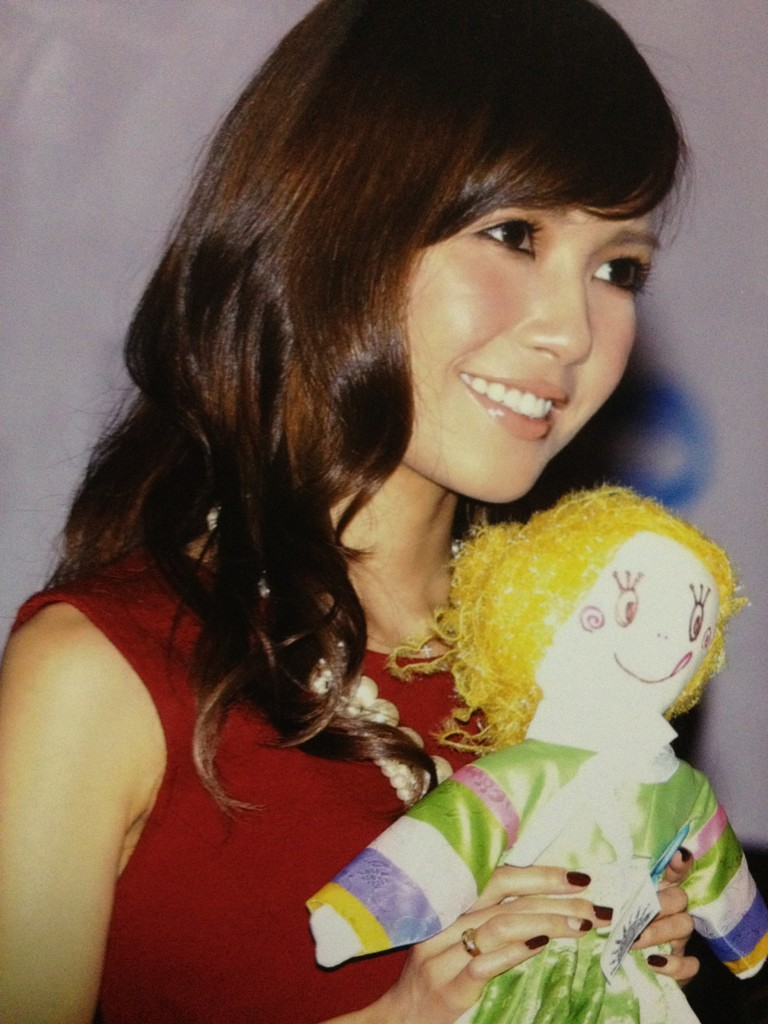
- Misako Uno and Awoo doll 'UNO' at the Asian Music Festival with UNICEF in 2011.
- Born: July 16, 1986 (age 40); Edogawa, Tokyo, Japan
- Other names: Uno-chan ( 宇野ちゃん); Uno Misako (AAA); UNO48; Akane (茜) or Akane Sarasa (茜 さらさ)
- Education: Shirayuri Women's University
- Occupations: Singer; actress; artist; tarento; essayist; talent agent
- Years active: 2005–present
- Employer: Avex Group
- Organization(s): YMCA and Japan Vegetarian Society
- Agents: Avex Entertainment (2005–2009); Avex Management (2009–present)
- Known for: network; magazine; Television; radio
- Notable work: The Grudge 2
- Style: Pop; musical theatre; new-age music
- Height: 1.60 m (5 ft 3 in)
- Spouse: Keiichiro Koyama (m. 2024)
- Children: 1
- Musical career
- Genres: Punk rock; jazz; reggae; j-pop
- Occupations: Vocalist; songwriter
- Instrument: Vocals
- Years active: 2005–present
- Label: Avex Trax
- Member of: AAA; AAA girls; MisaChia
- Website: AAA Official Website; Misako Uno Official Website

Misako Uno (宇野実彩子, Uno Misako; born July 16, 1986) is a Japanese Tarento, artist, actress, essayist and talent agent best known as a lead vocalist and dancer of the performing arts group AAA. She is also the Middle manager of Avex Group, advertising manager of SHUFU TO SEIKATSU SHA (主婦と生活社) and public fasting Consultant of Japan Enzyme Hydrogen Medical Beauty Society (日本酵素・水素医療美容学会). Her feature film debut as an actress was in the 2006 Hollywood horror film, The Grudge 2, as Miyuki.

== Career ==
Uno was born into a wealthy family. Her father was a copywriter and her mother was a social worker. Inspired by London's West End's Cats, Uno, from a young age, had aspirations of becoming a stage artist.

Her childhood was difficult and unsure; she described her primary school years as "dark times", as she was not good at running and jumping. Afflicted with a frail body and slow reflexes, she determined while still young to make herself regain confidence.

She spent fifteen years at Shirayuri Gakuen (白百合学園). At the age of 8, she began to write essays and study dance at this school. At the age of 11, she and two other students left Japan, representing the Ministry of Education, to go Germany's International Summer Camp.

She could not speak with other students because she didn't know any German. She decided to study English hard and resolved on going abroad. She later studied in London during her grade 8 summer vacation.

During her first year of high school Uno auditioned in Avex Group's "Avex Audition 2002,” where she came in second out of tens of thousands of participants. She was then signed onto the Avex Artist Academy. A year later, she set up the dance club of Shirayuri Gakuen. This club is the predecessor of AAA.

She made her debut in the 2005 drama SLOW DANCE, though it was only as background music. Later that year, she appeared as Mai Honda in the art film Their Waters (彼らの海) VIII -Sentimental Journey-. She had her first starring role as Akane Sueyoshi (末吉茜) in the 2006 antiwar drama Bokura no te (ボクラノテ).

In the same year, Columbia Pictures held an audition in search of an actor to be signed under their company. She passed the audition and made her Hollywood debut in the 2006 horror film The Grudge 2, as the Japanese student Miyuki Nazawa.

She had her first starring film role as Taniyama Miguru (谷山めぐる) in the 2010 Japan comedy film rendez-vous (ランデブー!). At the end of the year, she first appeared on NHK’s Kōhaku Uta Gassen.

In 2011, her early experiences were included in the Stepping stone Vol.7 Misako Uno, an English textbook compiled by the MEXT middle school and high school.

== Personal life ==
Keiichiro Koyama of NEWS announced his marriage to Uno on March 12, 2024. They registered their marriage on March 12, which is also the birthday of Uno's beloved father, who died in January 2023. The couple announced the birth of their first child (sex undisclosed) on 6 June 2025.

== Discography ==
=== Albums ===
List of albums, with selected chart positions
Title	Year	Peak positions	Sales (Note: Sales provided by Oricon database and rounded to the nearest thousand.)
Title	Year	JPN Oricon	Sales
Honey Stories	2019	5	17,000

=== Singles ===
==== As lead artist ====
List of singles as lead artist, with selected chart positions
Title	Year	Peak positions		Sales (Note: Sales provided by Oricon database and rounded to the nearest thousand.)
Title	Year	JPN Oricon	JPN Hot (Note: The Japan Hot 100 was established in 2008.)	Sales
"End of this Way"	2007	—N/a	—	
"Narou yo" (with Kazuya Kojima)	2016	—N/a	—	
"Doushite Koishite Konna"	2018	7	17	JPN: 20,000 (Phy.); JPN: 9,300 (Dig.)
"Summer Mermaid"	2018	11	37	JPN: 10,000 (Phy.); JPN: 4,000 (Dig.)
"Mint"	2019	13	65	JPN: 8,800 (Phy.)

==== As featured artist ====
List of singles as featured artist, with selected chart positions
Title	Year	Peak positions	Album
Title	Year	JPN Hot	Album
"Anata to Ashita mo" (Spicy Chocolate feat. Hazzie & Misako Uno)	2015	12	Shibuya Junai Monogatari 2

==== Promotional singles ====
List of promotional singles, with selected chart positions
Title	Year	Peak positions	Album
Title	Year	JPN Hot	Album
"Bijo to Yajuu" (with Takahiro Nishijima)	2017	31	Thank You Disney
"Lullaby" (with Sigala)	2018	— (Note: "Lullaby" did not enter the Japan Hot 100, but peaked at number 37 on the Top Download Songs chart.)	Honey Stories
"Lock on"	2018	— (Note: "Lock on" did not enter the Japan Hot 100, but peaked at number 29 on the Top Download Songs chart.)	Honey Stories
"One Love Pop"	2018	89	Honey Stories
"Yorusora"	2019	32	Honey Stories
"Saita Haru to Tomo ni Anata he Okuru Kotoba"	2019	— (Note: "Saita Haru to Tomo ni Anata he Okuru Kotoba" did not enter the Japan Hot 100, but peaked at number 22 on the Top Download Songs chart.)	Honey Stories

==== Other charted songs ====
List of other charted songs, with selected chart positions
Title	Year	Peak positions	Album
Title	Year	JPN Hot	Album
"Beauty and the Beast" (with Takahiro Nishijima)	2017	70	Non-album song

=== Other appearances ===
Title	Year	Other artist(s)	Album
"Groovin"	2005	Mayu	Slow Dance Original Soundtrack
"Good Time"	2005	Mayu, Eco	Slow Dance Original Soundtrack
"Now Is the Time"	2005		Slow Dance Original Soundtrack
"L.W.R"	2011	Naoya Urata; Wataru Yoshida (Purple Days)	Digitalian Is Eating Breakfast 2

== Filmography ==
=== Movies ===
- 2006: The Grudge 2 ... Miyuki
- 2010: Randebû! (ランデブー！) ... Meguru Taniyama

=== Stage plays ===
- 2006: Theater of AAA-bokura no te- (Theater of AAA〜ボクラノテ〜) … Akane Sueyoshi
- 2007: Super Battle Live Delicious Gakuin Bangaihen ~Delicious 5 Shijō Saidai no Teki~
- 2008: Love Letters
- 2010: Genji Monogatari and Ōguro Maki Songs -Boku wa Jyūnihitoe ni Koi wo Suru- (源氏物語×大黒摩季songs～僕は十二単に恋をする～) … Aoi no Ue (葵の上)
- 2011: Legend of the Galactic Heroes

=== TV drama ===
- 2008: Hitomi (瞳) … supporting role Keiko Endo
- 2010: Massugu na Otoko
- 2012: Umechan Sensei (梅ちゃん先生) … Akane Yabuki
- 2013: Tokyo Toy Box (東京トイボックス) … Hoshino Tsukiyama
- 2014: Big Tokyo Toy Box (大東京トイボックス)

=== Radio ===
- 2006–2007: Uno Misako no English Lyrics Selection
- AAA Uno Misako no Radio Unoccoli (FM Niigata, 2011–2014)

=== Books ===
- 2011: Kizuna Rensa (キズナレンサ)
- 2011: Houkago Gomi Hiro (放課後のゴミヒーロー)

==== Photo Album ====
- 2010: UNO
- 2012: UNO-BON
- 2014: You Know-UNONU-
- 2016: Bloomin'
- 2018: ABOUT TIME
