= Heart and Soul (AAA song) =

Single by AAA

from the album Heartful
- B-side: "Namida no Kizuna"; "Two Roads"
- Released: January 27, 2010
- Genre: Pop, Eurobeat
- Length: 4:24
- Label: Avex Trax
- Songwriters: Leonn, Mitsuhiro Hidaka, Shinya Saitō
- Producer: Ats

AAA singles chronology
"Hide-away" (2009)	"Heart and Soul" (2010)	"Aitai Riyū/Dream After Dream (Yume Kara Sameta Yume)" (2010)

"Heart and Soul" is Japanese band AAA's 23rd single, and the lead single released before their fifth studio album, Heartful. The single was released on January 27, 2010, a month before the album.

== Promotion ==
"Heart and Soul" was given two tie-ups: one as the ending theme song for the TBS Kantō area news show Niusuzansu, as well as being the music.jp TV commercial song. The B-side "Two Roads" (a solo song sung by Mitsuhiro Hidaka) was written by former The Kaleidoscope/Ricken's vocalist Takumi Ishida, and was used as the insert song for the film Sayonara Itsuka.

== Chart performance ==
The song debuted at No. 3 in its first week, selling 33,000 copies. It charted for a total of four weeks, with two more in the top 100 (at No. 30 and No. 87 respectively), before charting at No. 127 and then leaving the top 200. As the single sold a total of 37,000 copies, it was extremely front loaded, selling 90% of copies in its first week.

The song peaked at No. 15 on the Billboard Japan Hot 100, charting for three weeks before the single's release due to low-level airplay. The song peaked at No. 31 on the RIAJ Digital Track Chart and only ranked for a single week in the top 100.

== Track listing ==
No.	Title	Writer(s)	Arranger	Length
1.	"Heart and Soul"	Leonn, Mitsuhiro Hidaka, Shinya Saitō	Ats	4:24
2.	"Namida no Kizuna" (涙のキズナ "Tear Bonds" performed by Misako Uno, Chiaki Ito)	Leonn, Bounceback	Ats	5:44
3.	"Two Roads" (performed by Mitsuhiro Hidaka)	Takumi Ishida	Masaki Iehara	4:26
4.	"Heart and Soul (ArmySlick's Baytronic Mix)"	Leonn, Hidaka, Saitō	ArmySlick	4:49
5.	"Heart and Soul (Instrumental)"	Leonn, Hidaka, Saitō	Ats	4:23
6.	"Namida no Kizuna (Instrumental)"	Leonn, Bounceback	Ats	5:44
Total length:				29:30

DVD version A
No.	Title	Director(s)	Length
1.	"Heart and Soul (Music Clip)"	Nino
2.	"Heart and Soul (Music Making)"

DVD version B
No.	Title	Length
1.	""Break Down" (The Digest of AAA 4th Anniversary Live)"
2.	"Variety Movie: AAA Kokubi Club Sono Yon (VARIETY MOVIE -AAA極秘クラブ-其ノ四-, Variety Movie: AAA Absolute Secrecy Club #4)"

== Charts ==
Chart	Peak position
Oricon Weekly singles	3
Billboard Japan Hot 100	15
RIAJ Digital Track Chart Top 100	31

=== Reported sales ===
Chart	Amount
Oricon physical sales	37,000
