= 47th Japan Record Awards =

2005 Japanese music awards ceremony

- Date: 31 December 2005
- Venue: New National Theatre, Tokyo
- Hosted by: Masaaki Sakai, Haruka Ayase

Television/radio coverage
- Network: TBS

The 47th Annual Japan Record Awards took place at the New National Theatre in Shibuya, Tokyo, on 31 December 2005, starting at 6:00PM JST. The primary ceremonies were televised in Japan on TBS.

== Awards winners ==
- Japan Record Award:
  - Kumi Koda for Butterfly
- Best Vocalist:
  - Kaori Mizumori
- Best New Artist:
  - AAA
- Best Album:
  - Ketsumeishi for Ketsunopolis4

== See also ==
- 56th NHK Kōhaku Uta Gassen
