= Mitsuhiro Hidaka =

Japanese rapper and actor (born 1986)

- 日高 光啓
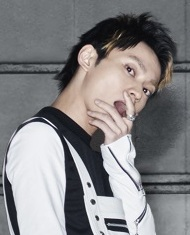
- Hidaka in 2015
- Born: December 12, 1986 (age 39); Chiba, Chiba Prefecture, Japan
- Occupations: Rapper; singer; actor; dancer
- Musical career
- Also known as: Sky-Hi
- Genres: J-pop; hip hop; pop; electronica; alternative rock
- Instruments: Vocals; guitar; piano
- Years active: 2005–present
- Labels: Bullmoose; Avex Trax (2005–2020); BMSG (2020-present)
- Member of: AAA
- Website: avex.jp/skyhi

Mitsuhiro Hidaka (日高 光啓, Hidaka Mitsuhiro; born December 12, 1986) is a Japanese rapper, singer, actor, dancer, and a member of the J-pop group AAA. He is the rapper of the group and also writes rap lyrics for the band. He is also a member of the hip hop trio Mother Ninjas. He also debuted as a solo artist in August 2013 as Sky-Hi.

== Controversies ==
On December 19, 2025, News Post Seven reported that Hidaka had had late-night meetings with a 17–year–old female idol at his home, dating back to around 2023, when she was 15, after Hidaka DM'd her. The idol had reportedly boasted about their connection to her acquaintance. News Post Seven reviewed the LINE messages Hidaka sent her, where he said, "(you are) so cute, I am dying," "(you are) so my type it is painful." News Post Seven quoted the idol's mother saying she didn't allow the meetings and wasn't aware of the recent visits, but later her father reached out to News Post Seven to say the parents gave her/him permission for meetings to seek music-related career advice. In Tokyo, taking a minor under the age of 18 out late at night without parental consent or a legitimate reason may constitute a violation of youth protection and development ordinances.

On December 19, 2025, BMSG, a music agency where Sky-Hi is CEO issued an apology with an official statement addressing recent media reports and announced internal measures for governance reform. On the post, the agency informed that they were aware of consent from the minor's guardian, but that the time of the meeting was inappropriate. They added that they would implement compliance awareness and sincerely work to restore trust so that such a situation did not occur again. Hidaka appeared on his radio program later, but did not talk about the issue.

On December 25, 2025, Sky-Hi/BMSG put out another statement, announcing a fundamental review of the management structure and the strengthening of corporate governance, the introduction of an independent and objective audit function covering all officers and employees, including executive leadership, the re-establishment of a strong compliance culture and the development of robust internal control systems and the restructuring of the management framework as well as cancellation of a live show planned for December 27th and a TV appearance planned for December 29th.

== Discography ==
=== Albums ===
==== Studio albums ====
Title	Album details	Peak positions		Sales
Title	Album details	JPN Oricon	JPN Billboard (Note: Week references for Billboard Japan Hot Albums: Catharsis, Olive, Best Catalyst: Collaboration Best Album, Japrison.)	Sales
Trickster	Released: March 12, 2014; Label: Avex Trax; Formats: CD, digital download	19	—N/a	
Catharsis (カタルシス)	Released: January 20, 2016; Label: Avex Trax; Formats: CD, digital download	5	7	
Olive	Released: January 18, 2017; Label: Avex Trax; Formats: CD, digital download	8	10	
Japrison	Released: December 12, 2018; Label: Avex Trax; Formats: CD, digital download	7	8	
Hachimen Roppi (八面六臂)	Released: October 27, 2021; Label: Avex Trax; Formats: CD, CD+DVD, CD+Blu-ray, digital download	5	—	
The Debut	Released: December 12, 2022; Label: Avex Trax; Formats: CD, digital download	10	—	
Success Is the Best Revenge	Released: December 12, 2026; Label: Avex Trax; Formats: CD, digital download	14	—	JPN: 3,240
"—" denotes releases that did not chart or were not released in that region.

==== Compilation albums ====
Title	Album details	Peak positions		Sales
Title	Album details	JPN Oricon	JPN Billboard	Sales
Best Catalyst: Collaboration Best Album (ベストカタリスト -Collaboration Best Album-)	Released: March 21, 2018; Label: Avex Trax; Formats: CD, digital download	11	22	

=== Singles ===
Title	Year	Peak chart positions		Sales	Album
Title	Year	JPN Oricon	JPN Billboard (Note: Week references for Billboard Japan Hot 100: "Ai Bloom", "Smile Drop", "Kamitsure Velvet", "Seaside Bound", "Iris Light", "Chronograph", "Nanairo Holiday", "Double Down", "Silly Game", "Time Traveling", "Snatchaway", "Super Idol".)	Sales	Album
"Ai Bloom" (愛ブルーム; "Love Bloom")	2013	22	34		
"Rule"	2013	22	—		
"Smile Drop" (スマイルドロップ)	2014	16	41		
Limo	2015	—	—		
"Kamitsure Velvet" (カミツレベルベット; Chamomile Velvet)	2015	12	31		
"Seaside Bound"	2015	11	20		
"Enter the Dungeon"	2015	—	—		
"Iris Light" (アイリスライト)	2016	2	13		
"Chronograph" (クロノグラフ)	2016	15	22		
"Nanairo Holiday" (ナナイロホリデー; "Rainbow Holiday")	2016	17	19		
"Double Down"	2016	15	45		
"Silly Game"	2017	9	42		
"Rapsta" (with SALU)	2017	—	—		
"Time Traveling" (タイムトラベリング) (with Czecho No Republic)	2017	42	57		
"Marble"	2017	—	—		
"Snatchaway"	2018	10	20		
"Diver's High"	2018	10	—		
"Super Idol" (with Nissy)	2023	—	16		Non-album single
"—" denotes releases that did not chart or were not released in that region.
