= Aitai Riyū / Dream After Dream (Yume Kara Sameta Yume) =

"Aitai Riyū/Dream After Dream (Yume Kara Sameta Yume)"
- CD+DVD Version A cover

Single by AAA

from the album Buzz Communication
- A-side: "Aitai Riyū"; "Dream After Dream (Yume Kara Sameta Yume)"
- B-side: "Dream After Dream (Yume Kara Sameta Yume) After the Night Mix"; "Aitai Riyū P-Rhythm Walk Mix"
- Released: May 5, 2010
- Recorded: January 2010
- Genre: Pop; dance-pop
- Label: Avex Trax
- Songwriters: Kyasu Morizuki "Aitai Riyū", Kenn Kato "Dream After Dream (Yume Kara Sameta Yume)"
- Producer: Tetsuya Komuro

AAA singles chronology
"Heart and Soul" (2010)	"Aitai Riyū/Dream After Dream (Yume Kara Sameta Yume)" (2010)	"Makenai Kokoro" (2010)

"Aitai Riyū/Dream After Dream (Yume Kara Sameta Yume)" (逢いたい理由/Dream After Dream ～夢から醒めた夢～; "To Meet with a Reason"/"Dream After Dream (Waking from a Dream Right Into Another Dream)") is a double A-side single by Japanese pop group AAA. It was released on May 5, 2010, via Avex Trax. The former was written by Kyasu Morizuki and the latter was written by Kenn Kato. Both songs were composed and produced by Tetsuya Komuro. "Aitai Riyū" is the theme song for the variety show that the group stars in Nihikime no Dojo (二匹目のどじょう, Nihikime no Dojō; Second Animal Dojo). The single debuted at number-one on the Oricon Weekly Chart becoming their second number-one single and Komuro's forty-third. "Aitai Riyū" was one of 10 songs awarded a Japan Record Award in 2010.

== Background ==
During August 2009 Tetsuya Komuro had composed about 60 demo songs. He was asked by Avex to work with AAA to which he agreed and chose two of the demos that he felt fitted the group perfectly. Recording for the single took place during January 2010. "Aitai Riyū" was written by Kyasu Morizuki, which has been described as mid-tempo ballad; while "Dream After Dream (Yume Kara Sameta Yume)" was written by Kenn Kato and was described as a dance-pop number. This is his comeback to the music scene since he was arrested two years ago for fraud.

== Packaging ==
The single is released in four formats; the regular CD version and two CD+DVD versions. The CD version contains remixes and instrumentals of both songs with "Dream After Dream (Yume Kara Sameta Yume)" placed as track number-one and the title of the cover art is changed to reflect that. CD+DVD version A comes with both songs, instrumentals, a DVD and the title of the cover art reflects that of the actual title of the single. CD+DVD version B contains the same contents as version A, however; like the CD version "Dream After Dream (Yume Kara Sameta Yume)" is track number-one and the cover art is changed to reflect it. The fourth version is a Mu-mo exclusive version that contains posters.

== Chart performance ==
On the Billboard Japan Hot 100 chart, Aiati Riyū debuted at number 58, issue date May 10, 2010. The following week, issue date May 17, 2010, the song moved up on the chart peaking at No. 13. The other A-side, "Dream After Dream (Yume Kara Sameta Yume)" debuted at number 26.

== Live performances ==
AAA appeared on May 9, 2010, episode of Music Japan, where they performed "Aitai Riyū". They appeared on Music Station on May 14, 2010, and performed "AItai Riyū". AAA performed both songs on their AAA Heart to Heart Tour 2010, with Komuro playing the piano during "Aitai Riyū".

== Track listing ==
Confirmed by Avex Trax.

CD only
No.	Title	Lyrics	Music	Length
1.	"Dream After Dream (Yume Kara Sameta Yume)" (Dream After Dream ～夢から醒めた夢～ "Dream After Dream (Waking from a Dream Right Into Another Dream)")	Kenn Kato	Tetsuya Komuro	4:17
2.	"Aitai Riyū" (逢いたい理由 "To Meet with a Reason")	Kyasu Morizuki	T. Komuro	4:36
3.	"Dream After Dream (Yume Kara Sameta Yume) After the Night Mix"			5:41
4.	"Aitai Riyū P-Rhythm Walk Mix"			6:25
5.	"Dream After Dream (Yume Kara Sameta Yume) (Instrumental)"			4:36
6.	"Aitai Riyū (Instrumental)"			4:17

CD+DVD Version A
No.	Title	Length
1.	"Aitai Riyū"	4:36
2.	"Dream After Dream (Yume Kara Sameta Yume)"	4:19
3.	"Aitai Riyū (Instrumental)"	4:36
4.	"Dream After Dream (Yume Kara Sameta Yume) (Instrumental)"	4:16

CD+DVD Version B
No.	Title	Length
1.	"Dream After Dream (Yume Kara Sameta Yume)"	4:17
2.	"Aitai Riyū"	4:37
3.	"Dream After Dream (Yume Kara Sameta Yume) (Instrumental)"	4:17
4.	"Aitai Riyū (Instrumental)"	4:35

== Charts and certifications ==
=== Charts ===
"Aitai Riyū"
A sample of the midtempo song "Aitai Riyū."

"Dream After Dream (Yume Kara Sameta Yume)"
A sample the upbeat song "Dream After Dream (Yume Kara Sameta Yume)."

Chart	Peak position
Aitai Riyū
Billboard Japan Hot 100	13
RIAJ Digital Track Chart	12
Dream After Dream (Yume Kara Sameta Yume)
Billboard Japan Hot 100	26
RIAJ Digital Track Chart	29
Aitai Riyū/Dream After Dream (Yume Kara Sameta Yume)
Oricon Daily Chart	1
Oricon Weekly Chart	1
Oricon Monthly Chart	8

== Release history ==
Region	Date	Format	Label
"Aitai Riyū"
Japan	April 8, 2010	Digital download	Avex Trax
"Dream After Dream (Yume Kara Sameta Yume)"
Japan	April 14, 2010	digital download	Avex Trax
"Aitai Riyū/Dream After Dream (Yume Kara Sameta Yume)"
Japan	May 5, 2010	CD single, digital download	Avex Trax
