= Friday Party =

- CD-only cover

Single by AAA

from the album Attack
- Released: October 5, 2005
- Recorded: 2005
- Genre: J-pop
- Length: 3:56
- Label: Avex Trax
- Songwriter: m.c.A.T

AAA singles chronology
"Blood on Fire" (2005)	"Friday Party" (2005)	"Kirei na Sora" (2005)

"Friday Party" is the second single by Japanese pop group AAA. The song was written by m.c.A.T and was included in the group's first studio album Attack. The single was released in Japan on October 5, 2005, under Avex Trax in two editions: a CD-only edition, and a CD and DVD edition. "Friday Party" debuted at number 17 on the weekly Oricon singles chart. The single charted for 10 weeks and went on to sell over 12,000 copies in Japan.

== Composition ==
"Friday Party" was written, composed and arranged by m.c.A.T.

== Release and promotion ==
"Friday Party" was released on October 5, 2005, in two editions: a CD-only edition, and a CD and DVD edition, which included the music video for the song. In that same month, the song was used as the ending theme song for Nippon Television's music television show Music Fighter. It was also used as the theme song for television series Sports Urugusu and in a television advertisement for music.jp.

== Chart performance ==
"Friday Party" debuted at number 17 on the weekly Oricon singles charts, selling 6,835 copies in its first week. It went on to chart for 10 weeks and sold over 12,000 copies in Japan.^{a}

== Track listing ==
CD-only
No.	Title	Lyrics	Music	Length
1.	"Friday Party"	m.c.A.T	m.c.A.T	3:56
2.	"Friday Party (Instrumental)"		m.c.A.T	3:56
Total length:				7:52

CD and DVD
No.	Title	Length
1.	"Friday Party" (music video)

== Notes ==
- ^Note a: The sales figure of 12,000 copies is taken from accumulating the sales of the single during its first three charting weeks on the Oricon weekly chart (6,835, 3,363, 1,961).
