= Best Hits Kayosai =

Annual Japanese music show

- Awarded for: Achievements in music
- Sponsored by: Yomiuri TV
- Country: Japan
- First award: 1968–2000 as Zen Nihon Yūsen Hōsō Taishō; 2001–2002 as All-Japan Request Awards; 2003–present as Best Hits Kayosai
- Website: www.ytv.co.jp/besthits/index.html

Best Hits Kayosai (ベストヒット歌謡祭, Besuto Hitto Kayōsai; "Best Hit Song Festival") is an annual music show in Japan sponsored by Yomiuri TV. It is broadcast on Yomiuri TV and Nippon Television.

== Details ==
For details of the shows broadcast from 1968 to 2000 see Zen Nihon Yūsen Hōsō Taishō (全日本有線放送大賞), from 2001 to 2002 see All-Japan Request Awards (ALL JAPANリクエストアワード).

== Other winners ==
This is a partial list of artists who have won awards other than a Grand Prix.
