= 777 (We Can Sing a Song!) =

- CD-only cover

Single by AAA

from the album 777: Triple Seven
- Released: July 25, 2012
- Recorded: 2012
- Genre: J-pop
- Length: 5:02
- Label: Avex Trax
- Songwriters: Mitsuhiro Hidaka, Leonn

AAA singles chronology
"Still Love You" (2012)	"777 (We Can Sing a Song!)" (2012)	"Niji" (2012)

"777 (We Can Sing a Song!)" (stylized "777 ～We can sing a song!～") is a song by Japanese pop group AAA. It is their 33rd single and is included in the group's seventh studio album 777: Triple Seven. The song was written by Mitsuhiro Hidaka and Leonn. The single was released in Japan on July 25, 2012, under Avex Trax in three editions: a CD-only edition, a CD and DVD edition, and a Mu-Mo edition. "777 (We Can Sing a Song!)" debuted at number four on the weekly Oricon singles chart. The single has charted for two weeks and went on to sell over 39,400 copies in Japan.

== Composition ==
"777 (We Can Sing a Song!)" was written by Mitsuhiro Hidaka and Leonn, composed by Hirofumi Hibino, and arranged by Blue Birds. "Birthday Song" was written by Kenn Kato, and composed by Jam9 and ArmySlick.

== Release and promotion ==
"777 (We Can Sing a Song!)" was released on July 25, 2012, in three editions: a CD-only edition; a CD and DVD edition, which includes the music video for the song and the music video making; a Mu-Mo edition, which includes the Think About AAA 6th Anniversary clips from season 21. The song was used in television advertisements for hypermarket Ito-Yokado's "Cool Magic" and "Koi Yukata" ads.

== Chart performance ==
"777 (We Can Sing a Song!)" debuted at number four on the weekly Oricon singles charts, selling 35,806 copies in its first week. It has charted for two weeks and sold over 39,400 copies in Japan.^{a} On the issue dated August 6, 2012, the song debuted at number eight on the Billboard Japan Hot 100.

== Track listing ==
CD-only
No.	Title	Lyrics	Music	Length
1.	"777 (We Can Sing a Song!)"	Mitsuhiro Hidaka, Leonn	Hirofumi Hibino	5:02
2.	"Birthday Song"	Kenn Kato	Jam9, ArmySlick	3:58
3.	"777 (We Can Sing a Song!)"		Hirofumi Hibino	5:02
4.	"Birthday Song"		Jam9, ArmySlick	3:58

CD and DVD
No.	Title	Length
1.	"777 (We Can Sing a Song!)" (music video)
2.	"777 (We Can Sing a Song!)" (music video making)

Mu-Mo
No.	Title	Lyrics	Music	Length
1.	"777 (We Can Sing a Song!)"	Mitsuhiro Hidaka, Leonn	Hirofumi Hibino	5:02
2.	"Birthday Song"	Kenn Kato	Jam9, ArmySlick	3:58
3.	"Think About AAA 6th Anniversary: Season 21"

== Chart history ==
Chart (2012)	Peak position
Billboard Japan Hot 100	8
Oricon Weekly Chart	4

== Notes ==
- ^Note a: The sales figure of 39,400 copies is taken from accumulating the sales of the single during its first two charting weeks on the Oricon weekly chart (35,806, 3,640).
