= Niji (AAA song) =

- CD-only cover

Single by AAA
- Released: October 31, 2012
- Recorded: 2012
- Genre: J-pop
- Length: 5:09
- Label: Avex Trax
- Songwriter: Greeeen

AAA singles chronology
"777 (We Can Sing a Song!)" (2012)	"Niji" (2012)	"Miss You" (2013)

"Niji" (虹, Rainbow) is a song by Japanese pop group AAA. It is their 34th single. The single was released in Japan on October 31, 2012, under Avex Trax in three editions: a CD-only edition, a CD and DVD edition, and a Mu-Mo edition. "Niji" debuted at number three on the weekly Oricon singles chart, selling over 40,000 copies in its first week.

A self-cover performed by the writers of the song, Greeeen, would later appear in their 2014 album Imakara Oyayubiga Kieru Tejinashimaasu.

== Composition ==
"Niji" was written and composed by Greeeen, and arranged by Takehito Shimizu and ats. "Good Day" was written by Leonn and composed by Kazuhito Kikuchi.

== Release and promotion ==
"Niji" was first performed on September 22, 2012, at the Yokohama Arena during the AAA 2012 Tour - 777: Triple Seven concert.

"Niji" was released on October 31, 2012, in three editions: a CD-only edition, which includes the Shohei Matsumoto EDM and Remo-con remixes; a CD and DVD edition, which includes the music video for the song and the music video making; and a Mu-Mo edition, which includes the Think About AAA 7th Anniversary clips from season 22. "Niji" was used as the promotional song for the mobile phone game Professional Baseball Dream Nine, and "Good Day" was used in the winter television advertisements for the hypermarket Ito-Yokado.

== Chart performance ==
"Niji" debuted at number three on the weekly Oricon singles charts, selling 40,025 copies in its first week. On the issue dated November 12, 2012, the song debuted at number six on the Billboard Japan Hot 100.

== Track listing ==
CD-only
No.	Title	Lyrics	Music	Length
1.	""Niji" (虹, Rainbow)"	Greeeen	Greeeen	5:09
2.	"Good Day"	Leonn	Kazuhito Kikuchi	5:44
3.	"Good Day (Shohei Matsumoto EDM Remix)"	Leonn	Greeeen	5:51
4.	"Good Day (Remo-con Remix)"	Leonn	Kikuchi	5:11
5.	""Niji" (虹, Rainbow)" (Instrumental)		Greeeen	5:09
6.	"Good Day" (Instrumental)		Kikuchi	5:44

CD and DVD
No.	Title	Length
1.	""Niji" (虹, Rainbow)" (music video)
2.	""Niji" (虹, Rainbow)" (music video making)

Mu-Mo
No.	Title	Length
1.	"Think About AAA 7th Anniversary: Season 22"

== Chart history ==
Chart (2012)	Peak position
Billboard Japan Hot 100	6
Oricon Weekly Chart	3
