= Blood on Fire =

- CD-only cover

Single by AAA

from the album Attack
- Released: September 14, 2005
- Recorded: 2005
- Genre: J-pop
- Length: 4:29
- Label: Avex Trax
- Songwriters: Osamu Sasaki, Mitsuhiro Hidaka
- Producer: Max Matsuura

AAA singles chronology
"Blood on Fire" (2005)	"Friday Party" (2005)

"Blood on Fire" (stylized as "BLOOD on FIRE") is the debut single by Japanese pop group AAA. The song was written by Osamu Sasaki and Mitsuhiro Hidaka, and produced by Max Matsuura. The single was released in Japan on September 14, 2005, under Avex Trax in two editions: a CD-only edition, and a CD and DVD edition. "Blood on Fire" debuted at number nine on the weekly Oricon singles chart. The single charted for 19 weeks and went on to sell over 46,000 copies in Japan.

== Composition ==
"Blood on Fire" was written by Osamu Sasaki and Mitsuhiro Hidaka, composed and arranged by Miki Watanabe, and produced by Max Matsuura.

== Release and promotion ==
"Blood on Fire" was released on September 14, 2005, in two editions: a CD-only edition, and a CD and DVD edition, which included the music video for the song. The song was used as the theme song for the 2005 live action film Initial D. In September 2007, an English-language Eurobeat version of the song by Go 2 and Christine was released on Avex Trax's Super Eurobeat Vol. 181 in September 2007. The AAA version was also included on Super Eurobeat 200 and Avex Trax's 20th anniversary album.

== Chart performance ==
"Blood on Fire" debuted at number nine on the weekly Oricon singles charts, selling 16,053 copies in its first week. It went on to chart for 19 weeks and sold over 46,000 copies in Japan.^{a} The song earned AAA the Best Newcomer Award at the 47th Japan Record Awards.

== Track listing ==
CD-only
No.	Title	Lyrics	Music	Length
1.	"Blood on Fire"	Osamu Sasaki, Mitsuhiro Hidaka	Miki Watabe	4:29
2.	"Blood on Fire (Instrumental)"		Miki Watabe	4:29
Total length:				8:58

CD and DVD
No.	Title	Length
1.	"Blood on Fire (music video)"
2.	"Initial D movie trailer"

== Notes ==
- ^Note a: The sales figure of 46,000 copies is taken from accumulating the sales of the single during its first six charting weeks on the Oricon weekly chart (16,053, 11,017, 7,509, 5,399, 4,014, 2,500).
