= Call / I4U =

"Call" / "I4U"
- CD-only C edition cover

Single by AAA
- Released: August 31, 2011
- Recorded: 2011
- Genre: J-pop
- Length: 5:24
- Label: Avex Trax
- Songwriters: Kenn Kato, Mitsuhiro Hidaka

AAA singles chronology
"No Cry No More" (2011)	"Call" / "I4U" (2011)	"Charge & Go! / Lights" (2011)

"Call" / "I4U" s the 29th single by Japanese pop group AAA. It is included in the group's second best of album AAA Best. The song was written by Kenn Kato and Mitsuhiro Hidaka. The single was released in Japan on August 31, 2011, under Avex Trax in six editions: CD and DVD A and B editions, CD-only C and D editions, and two Mu-Mo editions. "Call" / "I4U" debuted at number five on the weekly Oricon singles chart. The single charted for nine weeks and went on to sell over 42,300 copies in Japan.

== Composition ==
"Call" was written by Kenn Kato and Mitsuhiro Hidaka, composed by Masanori Takumi, and arranged by ats. "I4U" was written by Yusuke Toriumi and Hidaka, composed by Jam9 and ArmySlick, and arranged by ArmySlick. "Crazy Gonna Crazy (2011 Ver.)"—originally by TRF—was written and composed by Tetsuya Komuro, and arranged by Tohru Watanabe.

== Release and promotion ==
"Call" / "I4U" was released on May 16, 2012, in four editions: a CD and DVD A edition, which includes the music video for the song and the first part of the music video making; a CD and DVD B edition, which includes the second part of the music video making and an E~Panda?! video; a CD-only C edition, which includes "Crazy Gonna Crazy (2011 Ver.)" and its instrumental; a CD-only D edition; two Mu-Mo editions, which include the Think About AAA 6th Anniversary clips from seasons 10 and 11 in editions A and B, respectively. "Call" was used in television advertisements for hypermarket Ito-Yokado's brand Body Heater; "I4U" was used as the theme song in the anime film Prince of Tennis: Castle Battle the British.

== Chart performance ==
"Call" / "I4U" debuted at number five on the weekly Oricon singles charts, selling 35,451 copies in its first week. It went on to chart for nine weeks and sold over 42,300 copies in Japan.^{a} On the issue dated May 28, 2012, "Call" debuted at number eight on the Billboard Japan Hot 100. On the Recording Industry Association of Japan (RIAJ) Digital Track Chart, "Call" and "I4U" debuted at numbers 18 and 35, respectively.

== Track listing ==
CD-only
No.	Title	Lyrics	Music	Length
1.	"Call"	Kenn Kato, Mitsuhiro Hidaka	Masanori Takumi	4:18
2.	"I4U"	Yusuke Toriumi, Hidaka	Jam9, ArmySlick	4:42
3.	"Crazy Gonna Crazy (2011 Ver.)"	Tetsuya Komuro	Komuro	5:53
4.	"Call" (Instrumental)		Takumi	4:18
5.	"I4U" (Instrumental)		Jam9, ArmySlick	4:42
6.	"Crazy Gonna Crazy (2011 Ver.)" (Instrumental)		Komuro	5:48

CD and DVD A
No.	Title	Length
1.	"Call" (music video)
2.	"Call" (music video making part 1)

CD and DVD B
No.	Title	Length
1.	"Call" (music video making part 2)
2.	"E~Panda?!"

Mu-Mo
No.	Title	Lyrics	Music	Length
1.	"Call"	Mitsuhiro Hidaka, Kaji Katsura	Shirose from White Jam, Heroism, DJ First from White Jam Beatz	5:24
2.	"I4U"			5:23
3.	"Think About AAA 6th Anniversary: Season 10" (Mu-Mo A Edition only)
4.	"Think About AAA 6th Anniversary: Season 11" (Mu-Mo B Edition only)

== Chart history ==
Chart (2012)	Release	Peak position
Billboard Japan Hot 100	"Call"	8
Oricon Weekly Chart	"Call" / "I4U"	5
RIAJ Digital Track Chart	"Call"	18
RIAJ Digital Track Chart	"I4U"	35

== Notes ==
- ^Note a: The sales figure of 42,300 copies is taken from accumulating the sales of the single during its first three charting weeks on the Oricon weekly chart (35,451, 4,609, 2,260).
