= Still Love You =

- CD-only cover

Single by AAA

from the album 777: Triple Seven
- Released: May 16, 2012
- Recorded: 2012
- Genre: J-pop
- Length: 5:24
- Label: Avex Trax
- Songwriters: Mitsuhiro Hidaka, Kaji Katsura

AAA singles chronology
"Sailing" (2012)	"Still Love You" (2012)	"777 (We Can Sing a Song!)" (2012)

"Still Love You" is a song by Japanese pop group AAA. It is their 32nd single and is included in the group's seventh studio album 777: Triple Seven. The song was written by Mitsuhiro Hidaka and Kaji Katsura. The single was released in Japan on May 16, 2012, under Avex Trax in four editions: a CD-only edition, a CD and DVD A edition, a CD and DVD B edition, and a Mu-Mo edition. "Still Love You" debuted at number three on the weekly Oricon singles chart. The single charted for seven weeks and went on to sell over 55,000 copies in Japan.

== Composition ==
"Still Love You" was written by Mitsuhiro Hidaka and Kaji Katsura, composed by Shirose from White Jam, Heroism, and DJ First from White Jam Beatz, and arranged by ats. "I$M" was written by Goro Matsui, Kenn Kato, Bounceback, Kenko-p, Leonn, Kyasu Morizuki, and Hidaka, composed by Kazuyuki Akita, and arranged by Kazuki Kumagai.

== Release and promotion ==
"Still Love You" was released on May 16, 2012, in four editions: a CD-only edition, which includes "Still Love You (Remo-con Remix)"; a CD and DVD A edition, which includes the music video for the song, the first part of the music video making, and the third part of the AAA 6th Anniversary Tour; a CD and DVD B edition, which includes the second part of the music video making and the fourth part of the AAA 6th Anniversary Tour; a Mu-Mo edition, which includes the Think About AAA 6th Anniversary clips from seasons 18, 19, and 20 in editions A, B, and C, respectively. The song was used in television advertisements for the hypermarket Ito-Yokado.

== Chart performance ==
"Still Love You" debuted at number three on the weekly Oricon singles charts, selling 48,284 copies in its first week. It went on to chart for seven weeks and sold over 55,000 copies in Japan.^{a} On the issue dated May 28, 2012, the song debuted at number eight on the Billboard Japan Hot 100. On the Recording Industry Association of Japan (RIAJ) Digital Track Chart, the song debuted at number 10.

== Track listing ==
CD-only
No.	Title	Lyrics	Music	Length
1.	"Still Love You"	Mitsuhiro Hidaka, Kaji Katsura	Shirose from White Jam, Heroism, DJ First from White Jam Beatz	5:24
2.	"I$M"	Goro Matsui, Kenn Kato, Bounceback, Kenko-p, Leonn, Kyasu Morizuki, Mitsuhiro Hidaka	Kazuyuki Akita	5:23
3.	"Still Love You (Remo-con Remix)"	Hidaka, Katsura	Shirose from White Jam, Heroism, DJ First from White Jam Beatz	8:38
4.	"Still Love You (Instrumental)"		Shirose from White Jam, Heroism, DJ First from White Jam Beatz	5:24
5.	"I$M (Instrumental)"		Akita	5:23

CD and DVD A
No.	Title	Length
1.	"Still Love You" (music video)
2.	"Still Love You" (music video making part 1)
3.	"AAA 6th Anniversary Tour part 3"

CD and DVD B
No.	Title	Length
1.	"Still Love You" (music video making part 2)
2.	"AAA 6th Anniversary Tour part 4"

Mu-Mo
No.	Title	Lyrics	Music	Length
1.	"Still Love You"	Mitsuhiro Hidaka, Kaji Katsura	Shirose from White Jam, Heroism, DJ First from White Jam Beatz	5:24
2.	"ISM"			5:23
3.	"Think About AAA 6th Anniversary: Season 18" (Mu-Mo A Edition only)
4.	"Think About AAA 6th Anniversary: Season 19" (Mu-Mo B Edition only)
5.	"Think About AAA 6th Anniversary: Season 20" (Mu-Mo C Edition only)

== Chart history ==
Chart (2012)	Peak position
Billboard Japan Hot 100	8
Oricon Weekly Chart	3
RIAJ Digital Track Chart	10

== Notes ==
- ^Note a: The sales figure of 55,000 copies is taken from accumulating the sales of the single during its first six charting weeks on the Oricon weekly chart (48,284, 4,946, 2,129).
