= Takahiro Nishijima =

Japanese singer and actor (born 1986)

Takahiro Nishijima 西島 隆弘
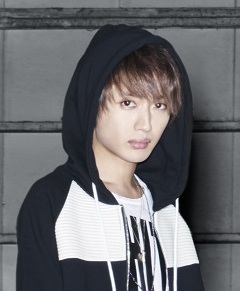
- Nishijima in 2015

Background information
- Born: September 30, 1986 (age 39); Sapporo, Hokkaido, Japan
- Occupations: Singer, actor
- Years active: 2005–present
- Label: Avex Trax
- Website: avex.jp/nissy

Takahiro Nishijima (西島 隆弘, Nishijima Takahiro; born September 30, 1986) is a Japanese singer and actor who was the main vocalist of the group AAA until 11 February 2026. He also performs as a solo singer known as Nissy.

== Filmography ==
=== Television ===
Year	Title	Role	Network	Notes	Ref(s)
2007	Delicious Gakuin	Rouma Kitasaka	TV Tokyo	Lead	
2009	Ghost Friends	Kaito Hayami	NHK		
2010	Tumbling	Tetsuya Hino	TBS		
2011	Diplomat Kosaku Kuroda	Yutaro Kimijima	Fuji TV		
2012	Taira no Kiyomori	Taira no Yorimori	NHK	Taiga drama	
2016	Love That Makes You Cry	Asahi Ibuki	Fuji TV		

=== Film ===
Year	Title	Role	Notes	Ref(s)
2008	Love Exposure	Yu Honda	Lead	
2012	Himizu	You		
2012	Signal	Keisuke Miyase	Lead	

== Discography ==
- Hocus Pocus (2016)
- Hocus Pocus 2 (2017)
- Hocus Pocus 3 (2022)
- Hocus Pocus 4 (2024)
