= AAA (band) =

Japanese pop group

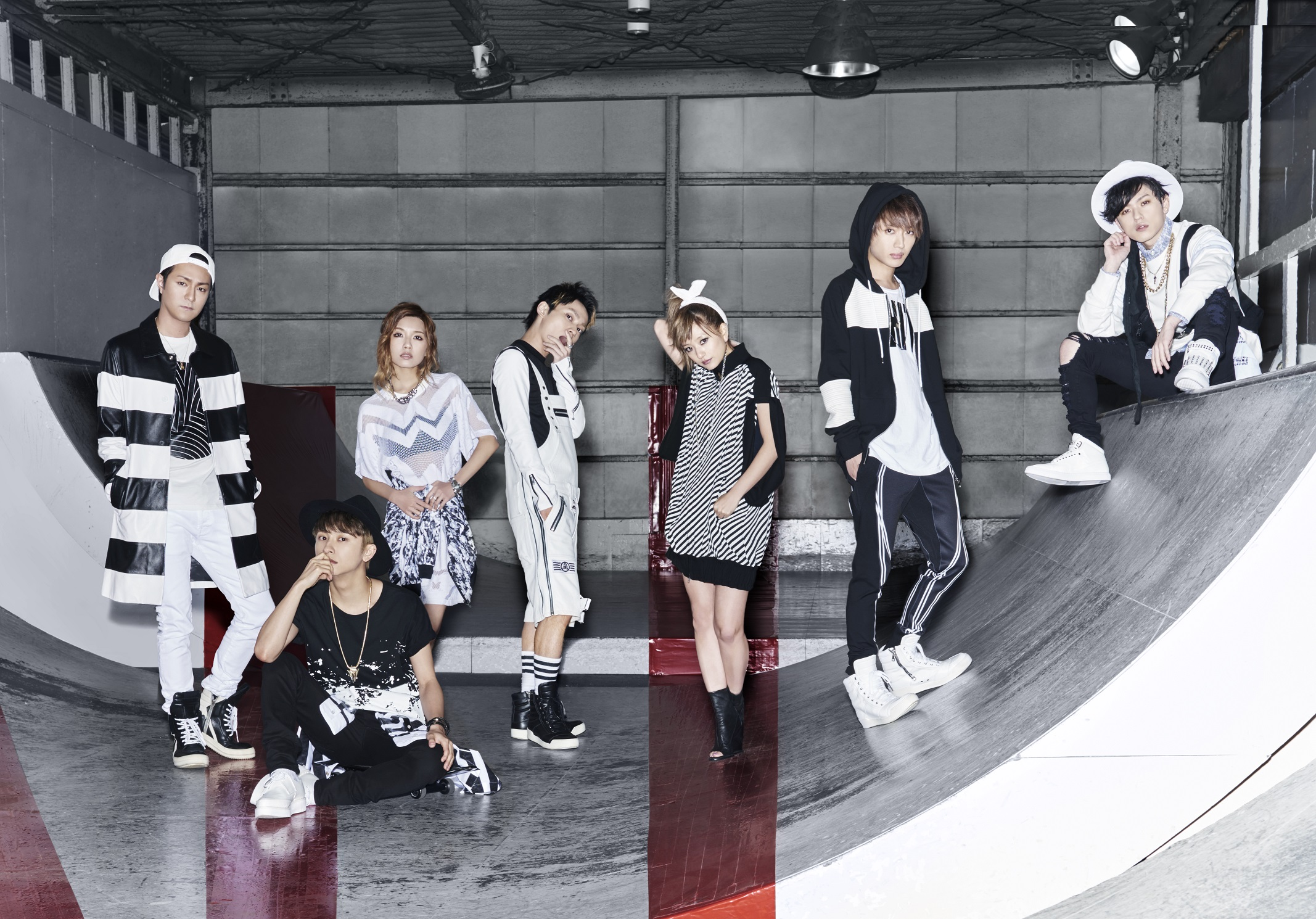
- AAA in 2015; From left to right: Urata, Atae, Uno, Hidaka, Ito, Nishijima and Sueyoshi

Background information
- Origin: Japan
- Genres: J-pop; EDM; Eurobeat
- Years active: 2005–2021
- Label: Avex Trax
- Members: Misako Uno; Mitsuhiro Hidaka; Shinjiro Atae; Shuta Sueyoshi
- Past members: Yukari Goto; Chiaki Ito; Naoya Urata; Takahiro Nishijima
- Website: www.avex.jp/aaa

AAA (pronounced Triple A; also an acronym for Attack All Around) were a Japanese pop group signed to the label Avex Trax which debuted in September 2005. The name has the meaning of "challenging everything" or "against all odds", and the group is marketed by their label as a "super performance unit".

The group was formed through Avex's own auditions, and originally consisted of five young men and three young women who had appeared in commercials and/or had prior experience as backup dancers for other Japanese stars, such as Ayumi Hamasaki and Ami Suzuki.

== History ==
=== 2005–2006: Early days and debut ===
AAA's first logo (2005–2011)

AAA was originally planned to be a six-member group. Initially, it included the five male members Takahiro Nishijima, Naoya Urata, Shuta Sueyoshi, Shinjiro Atae, Mitsuhiro Hidaka, and Misako Uno as the only female member. Avex later decided to add two more female members, Yukari Goto then Chiaki Ito. All eight entered the agency through auditions and underwent training in the Avex Artist Academy, the record label's talent training facility. As the songs "Blood on Fire" and "Friday Party" were prepared before their debut for six members, the two girls are only heard in the refrain.

In April 2005, Avex officially announced the debut of the group with seven members (excluding Ito), and oldest member Urata as the leader. AAA officially started their activities as a group in May. On June 15, Ito was added to the group. AAA debuted on September 14 that year with "Blood on Fire" and were received well due to the song being used as the theme song of the live action Initial-D movie.

In their debut year, they received the "Best Newcomer Award" at the 47th Japan Record Awards. From September to December they released a single each month plus a photobook and their very first album, Attack, in January 2006. With all the releases and promotional activities, the group did not have time to perform their songs live. However, as each of the singles tackled different genres, they did relatively well on the charts.

In June 2006, AAA's official fan club "AAA Party" opened its doors. Uno, the female lead singer, starred alongside Sarah Michelle Gellar in the Hollywood version of The Grudge 2 which opened in theaters October 2006. After releasing mini album "All/2" on September 13, 2006, AAA released their second studio album All on January 1, 2007. With the exception of three new songs, the songs on "All" had been previously released as singles with music videos throughout 2006. The album's sales were a success although less than its predecessor "Attack".

=== 2007–2009: Media mix and acting ===
In 2007, AAA had another theme song tie-up with Kamen Rider Den-O, "Climax Jump", which they released as a single under the temporary name "AAA Den-O Form". The single sold well and was certified Gold by the Recording Industry Association of Japan (RIAJ) for the shipment of 100,000 physical singles and 100,000 full-track ringtone music downloads each, making it their most successful single to date.

The group's members gradually started delving into acting jobs, giving them more mainstream exposure. Their 14th single "Kuchibiru Kara Romantica/That's Right" was tied-up with television drama serial Delicious Gakuin, which starred members Nishijima and Atae.

On 11 June 2007, it was announced that Goto would be leaving the group permanently, citing her health problems and deciding to focus on recovery. With her departure, AAA became a septet. Shortly after, the group made their first venture overseas with an appearance at Otakon 2007 in Baltimore, Maryland. Urata and Ito appeared in a movie for the first time, Heat Island which opened in theaters 20 October 2007.

AAA scored their first Oricon weekly number one single in 2008 with "Mirage", and the group released their first compilation album Attack All Around. They did not release an original studio album as a group for the year, but the five male members recorded a special mini-album, Choice is Yours, and released it under the AAA name on 18 June. In October, the drama serial Mirai Seiki Shakespeare which was a modern retelling of Shakespeare plays, started its broadcast. All members of AAA played main characters in the drama. Nishijima also manifested an interest in acting during the year as he acted in multiple stage plays.

Nishijima received his first starring role in film, playing the lead character in Love Exposure, which released in January 2009. His acting in the film was critically acclaimed, earning him the Sponichi Grand Prix New Face Award of the Year 2009 and was named Best New Male Actor at the 83rd Kinema Junpo Awards.

The group released their fourth album DepArture on 11 February 2009, and the album peaked at number four on the Oricon charts, the first time the group achieved a place within the top five for a studio album.

After a string of moderate hits throughout 2007–2008, AAA started a successful era in 2009 with their album Heartful and all of its preceding singles debuting in the top three. For the first time ever, they were able to guest on the popular music program Music Station, to perform "Hide Away". "Hide Away" also represented a new era of sorts for the group, as Ito started to sing more lines, joining Nishijima, Uno and Urata as lead singers. At the end of the year, they release a single title named "With You" and was used as the first ending theme of Inuyasha: The Final Act.

=== 2010–2015: First Asia tour and tenth anniversary ===
AAA's second logo (2011–2021)

In 2010, AAA's double A-side 24th single "Aitai Riyū/Dream After Dream ~Yume Kara Sameta Yume~" topped the Oricon weekly charts in May 2010, becoming their second number one single on the charts. The single was hyped as the comeback work of composer Tetsuya Komuro, which helped in promoting the single.

Due to the popularity of "Aitai Riyū", they were invited to make their debut appearance on Kōhaku Uta Gassen that year, greatly heightening the group's exposure. In December, member Urata released his own single "Dream On" featuring his good friend and label mate Ayumi Hamasaki. The single reached number one on the Oricon charts, raising his own profile and that of the group.

With the exception of "Call/I4U", Komuro continued to work with AAA through to 31st single "Sailing". All of the songs on their sixth album "Buzz Communication" were composed by Komuro. In 2011, they released their second compilation album #AAABEST and it went on to become their best selling album at the time, as well as becoming their first number one album on the Oricon weekly charts. Starting from "Call/I4U", the group also gradually shifted away from the "lead singer" position and more equal singing opportunities were given to all members.

Their 32nd single "Still Love You" marked a departure from Komuro as they began to work with other composers again. On 22 August 2012, AAA released the album "777 -Triple Seven", so titled to represent the seven members, their seventh album, and the group's seventh anniversary since debut. In October, AAA's brand new variety show titled AAA no Kizuna Gasshuku started airing on TV Asahi and YouTube. At the end of the year, AAA was invited to perform at Kōhaku Uta Gassen for the third year running.

In 2013, the group kicked off a new nationwide tour titled "AAA Tour 2013 Eighth Wonder" on 20 April. It is the largest scale tour the group has attempted to date, taking place at 41 venues with an estimated 150,000 fans attending. In May, it was reported that AAA no Kizuna Gasshuku which had ended, recorded over 10 million plays on YouTube, and the second season began airing. Furthermore, in July, it was announced that there would be a third season of the show and AAA would be shooting the show abroad for the first time, in Singapore.

On 18 September, the group released their eighth album titled Eighth Wonder. The album went on to become AAA's first original studio album to top the Oricon charts. The group's music video for "Koi Oto to Amazora" claimed top spot for most number of views in September on YouTube, for the Japanese music category. AAA closed out the year by performing the song at Kōhaku Uta Gassen. The theme song for the Japanese version of The Fault in Our Stars is "Lil Infinity" by the band.

On 14 January 2014, it was announced that AAA had been appointed the PR ambassadors for the fifteenth anniversary of anime One Piece, and provided a new song titled "Wake up!" for its opening theme. On 17 May, the group began their first all-arena nationwide tour, "AAA ARENA TOUR 2014 -Gold Symphony-", their biggest tour yet with an estimated attendance of 200,000 people. AAA released their ninth studio album, Gold Symphony on 1 October, which became the second original studio album to top the Oricon charts. During the last day of the concert tour on 18 October, it was announced that AAA will be preparing for their first Asia tour in 2015. In 2015, AAA released their 10th Anniversary Best studio album, which contained the singles, "I'll be There", "Lil' Infinity" and "Aishiteru no ni, Aisenai".

=== 2016–2021: First dome concerts, Ito and Urata's departure, hiatus ===
On January 21, 2016, they announced their 22-date concert tour entitled "AAA ARENA TOUR 2016 -LEAP OVER-" in celebration of going beyond their ten years in the industry. It began on May 11, 2016 at MARINE MESSE FUKUOKA.

AAA's first dome performance was announced on June 2, 2016 during their concert at OSAKA-JO HALL. The special live dates were from 12th to 13 November 2016 at KYOCERA DOME OSAKA. They also released their 51st single, "NEW" on June 8, 2016. On their last day of -LEAP OVER- Tour, on July 24 at SEKISUI HEIM SUPER ARENA, they announced their first Tokyo Dome performance which was on November 16, 2016. The concerts, including the ones from Osaka, were entitled "AAA Special Live 2016 in Dome -FANTASTIC OVER-". They also had their second Asia tour on August 12, 2016 in Taiwan and on September 4, 2016 in Singapore.

On January 12, 2017 it was announced that Chiaki Ito would be leaving the group at the end of March because of pregnancy and marriage. Ito is married to 40-year-old non celebrity male in December 2016. "MAGIC", their last single as seven members, was released on February 8, 2017. Following the single, the full-length album entitled "WAY OF GLORY" was released on February 22, 2017.

AAA's first single as six members was released on June 28, 2017, entitled "No Way Back". On June 17, 2017 at Hiroshima Green Arena, they kicked off a new arena concert tour with ten dates promoting the tenth album. AAA also embarked on their first-ever dome tour on four major domes with 320,000 attendees. It began on September 2, 2017 at Nagoya Dome.

AAA had their official fan meetings for the first time, called "AAA FAN MEETING ARENA TOUR 2018-FAN FUN FAN-". It started on May 26, 2018 at OSAKA-JO HALL. On August 22, 2018, AAA released their 11th and last studio album entitled "COLOR A LIFE". They also had their four-major dome tour with 340,000 attendees to promote the album. The second dome tour began on September 1, 2018 at Tokyo Dome.

On April 19, 2019, Urata was arrested for assaulting a 20-year-old woman. Despite the issue, AAA, without Urata, embarked on their scheduled fan meetings and dome tour called "AAA FAN MEETING ARENA TOUR 2019-FAN FUN FAN-" and "AAA DOME TOUR 2019 +PLUS" respectively. They also released their 57th and last single entitled "BAD LOVE" on October 23, 2019. Following the arrest, on December 31, 2019, Urata announced that he would be leaving the group.

On January 15, 2020, AAA announced that they were halting activities on December 31 to focus on individual activities and personal lives, with a 15th anniversary greatest hits album entitled "AAA 15th Anniversary All Time Best -thanx AAA lot-" released on February 19. They also held a six-major dome tour, a first in Japanese history by a gender-mixed performance group. The tour was originally set to begin November 7 at MetLife Dome. On October 2, 2020, it was announced that the dome tour would be postponed to 2021 due to the effects of the COVID-19 pandemic in Japan. However, the group's suspension of activities went on as planned.

On December 26, 2022, AAA announced that AAA Official Fanclub" AAA Party" and AAA Official Mobile Site "AAA mobile" were shut down.

On February 11, 2026, it was announced that Takahiro Nishijima had left the group in order to focus on his ongoing medical treatment after having his fourth throat surgery.

== Members ==
The information listed is according to their profiles.

- Misako Uno
- Mitsuhiro Hidaka
- Shinjiro Atae
- Shuta Sueyoshi

=== Former members ===
- Yukari Goto (2005–2007)
- Chiaki Ito (2005–2017)
- Naoya Urata (2005–2019)
- Takahiro Nishijima (2005-2026)

== Discography ==
- Attack (2006)
- All (2007)
- CCC: Challenge Cover Collection (2007)
- Around (2007)
- Departure (2009)
- Heartful (2010)
- Buzz Communication (2011)
- 777: Triple Seven (2012)
- Eighth Wonder (2013)
- Gold Symphony (2014)
- AAA 10th Anniversary Best (2015)
- Way of Glory (2017)
- Color a Life (2018)

== Photobooks ==
=== Group photobooks ===
Title	Release date
AAA Artistbook / The First Attack	2005-09-01
AAA 5th anniversary Live Original Photo Book	2010-10-08
AAA Buzz Communication Original Photo Book	2011-07-15
AAA Buzz Communication Documentary Extra Book	2011-11-25
AAA Tour 2012 -777- Triple Seven Documentary Book	2012-09-07
AAA 7th Anniversary Book ABC~AAA Book Chronicle~	2012-12-14
AAA 2013 Tour Book Eighth Wonder	2014-02-27
AAA 2013 Tour Eighth Wonder Premium Box	2014-03-27
AAA Attack All Around 10th Anniversary Book	2015-01-07

== Achievements ==
=== Awards ===
- 2005
  - Best Hit Kayousai – Newcomer Award for "Blood on Fire"
  - 38th Japan Cable Awards (Nihon Yusen Taisho) – Yusen Music Award for "Blood on Fire"
  - 47th Japan Record Awards – Best New Artist Award for "Blood on Fire"
- 2006
  - Best Hit Kayousai – Gold Artist Award for "Hurricane Riri, Boston Mari"
- 2009
  - Best Hit Kayousai – Gold Artist Award for "Break Down"
- 2010
  - 52nd Japan Record Awards – Outstanding Work Award for "Aitai Riyu"
- 2011
  - 53rd Japan Record Awards – Outstanding Work Award for "Call"
- 2012
  - 54th Japan Record Awards – Outstanding Work Award for "777 〜We can sing a song!〜"
- 2013
  - 55th Japan Record Awards – Outstanding Work Award for "Koi Oto to Amazora"
- 2014
  - 56th Japan Record Awards – Outstanding Work Award for "Sayonara No Mae Ni"
- 2015
  - 57th Japan Record Awards – Outstanding Work Award for "Aishiteru no ni, Aisenai"
- 2016
  - 58th Japan Record Awards – Outstanding Work Award for "Namida no nai Sekai"

=== RIAJ Gold-certified works ===
- Climax Jump (as AAA DEN-O Form)
- #AAABEST
- Gold Symphony

== Filmography ==
=== Variety ===
- Channel A (TVK, 2005–2006)
- Channel A (TVK, 2008–2009)
- Nihikime no Dōjō (NTV, 2010)
- AAA no Kizuna Gasshuku (TV Asahi and YouTube, 2012–2013)
- AAA no Kizuna Gasshuku 2 (TV Asahi and YouTube, 2013)
- AAA no Kizuna Gasshuku 3 (TV Asahi and YouTube, 2013–2014)
- AAA no Onore Migaki (NTT Docomo Sugotoku Contents, 2014)

=== Drama ===
- Mirai Seiki Shakespeare (KTV, 2008–2009)
- Another Face ~Criminal Affairs Division, Ōtomo Tetsu~ (TV Asahi, 2012)

=== Movies ===
- Akihabara@Deep (2006)

=== Stage plays ===
- Theater of AAA ~Bokura no Te~ (2006)
- Super Battle Live Delicious Gakuin Bangaihen ~Delicious 5 Shijō Saidai no Teki~ (2007)

=== Radio ===
- AAA no A~Ohanashi (NBS, 2005–2007)
- Ikinari! Mokuyoubi: AAA no Radio'n Fire (TBC, 2006–2008)
- Radio Sessions: AAA Talking Attack (JFN, 2007–2009)

Preceded by Ai Otsuka	Japan Record Award for Best New Artist; 2005	Succeeded by Ayaka
