= Avex Trax =

Japanese record label

- Parent company: Avex Inc.
- Founded: September 1988; 37 years ago
- Founder: Max Matsuura
- Distributors: Avex Music Creative (Avex Inc.) (since 1997); Former distributors; SOHBI Corporation (1988–1992); Nippon Crown Co. Ltd. (1992–1997)
- Genre: Various (mostly J-pop and Dance)
- Country of origin: Japan
- Location: Minato, Tokyo
- Official website: avexnet.jp

Avex Trax (Japanese: エイベックス トラックス, Hepburn: Eibekkusu Torakkusu) is a record label owned by Japanese entertainment conglomerate Avex Inc. The label was launched in September 1988, and was the first label by the Group.

== History ==
Two years after Max Matsuura began a career distributing studio albums from other countries, he and his two Avex co-founders, Tom Yoda and Ken Suzuki, decided to found their own label. Aiming to compete with more established labels such as Nippon Columbia, Nippon Crown, BMG Victor, Victor Musical Industries, Toshiba-EMI, CBS/Sony, Teichiku Records, King Records, Nippon Phonogram and PolyGram K.K., they created the Avex Trax label.

The first artist to sign to the label was the band TRF, which became a success. This led to Avex Trax becoming a "house of refuge" for artists who had left their former labels (e.g. Bananarama from Polydor K.K., Ayumi Hamasaki from Nippon Columbia, Namie Amuro from Toshiba-EMI, Ami Suzuki from Sony Music Japan). It also appealed to artists not content with their current labels (e.g. Gackt from Nippon Crown).

Formerly distributed by Sohbi Corporation until 1992 and then by the Nippon Crown label from 1992 on, in 1997 Avex became a self-distributed label together with Cutting Edge, which was formerly distributed by Toshiba-EMI.

== Sub-labels ==
=== Current ===
- B-ME – joint venture with BMSG
- Bluestar Records (Since 2019) – formerly a sub-label of Cutting Edge
- Love Life Records – Hitomi's private label
- motorod (Since 2002) – formerly a sub-label of Cutting Edge
- Frame - joint venture with Level-5
- 影別苦須 虎津苦須 – Kishidan's vanity label

=== Defunct ===
- J-Friends Project (1997–2003) – joint venture with Johnny & Associates

== Notable artists ==
Groups

- @onefive
- Boku ga Mitakatta Aozora
- Bridear
- Chō Tokimeki Sendenbu
- DA-ICE
- Do As Infinity
- Every Little Thing
- Exo (Note: Japanese distribution)
- GENIC
- Kamen Rider Girls
- Ketsumeishi
- kolme
- lol
- Mameshiba no Taigun
- NCT
- Red Velvet
- SKE48
- Super Junior
- TRF
- Tohoshinki
- Tokyo Girls' Style

Soloists

- Aina the End
- Shinjiro Atae
- Beverly
- BoA
- Che'Nelle
- Ayumi Hamasaki
- Chiaki Ito
- Hitomi Kaji
- Keiko
- m.c.A.T
- Michael Fortunati
- Michi/michimemoir
- Nissy
- Seiko Oomori
- Ai Otsuka
- Pikotaro
- Shuta Sueyoshi
- Misako Uno
- Naoya Urata
- Takuro Yoshida

=== Labels ===
==== B-ME ====
- Be First
- Novel Core
- Sky-Hi

==== Bluestar Records ====
- MASH

==== Love Life Records ====
- Hitomi

==== motorod ====
- Nanase Aikawa

==== 影別苦須 虎津苦須 ====
- Kishidan

== Former artists ==
Groups

- AAA
- After School
- SweetS

Soloists

- Sae Ōtsuka
- Hitomi Shimatani
- Namie Amuro

Duos

- Soul Control

=== J-Friends Project ===
- J-Friends

=== motorod ===
- Dead End
- Janne Da Arc
- Oblivion Dust
