= 1967 in Japanese music =

In 1967 (Shōwa 42), Japanese music was released on records, and there were charts, awards, contests and festivals.

== Awards, contests and festivals ==
The 10th Anniversary Osaka International Festival (Japanese: 大阪国際フェスティバル) was held from 7 April to 7 May 1967. The 9th Japan Record Awards were held on 16 December 1967. The 18th NHK Kōhaku Uta Gassen was held on 31 December 1967.

The 16th Otaka prize was won by Akio Yashiro.

== Number one singles ==
=== Billboard ===
The following reached number 1 according to weekly singles charts published in Billboard:

- 7 January, 28 January, 4 February, 11 February, 18 February and 25 February: Yume Wa Yoru Hiraku - Ako Midorikawa (Crown) and Mari Sono (Polydor)
- 4 March and 11 March: Konyawa Odorou (Japanese: 今夜は踊ろう) - Ichiro Araki
- 18 March, 25 March, 1 April, 8 April, 15 April, 22 April, 29 April, 6 May and 20 May: Kimikoso Waga Inochi - Hiroshi Mizuhara
- 13 May, 27 May and 10 June: Yogiriyo Konyamo Arigatou - Yūjirō Ishihara
- 3 June: Balla Balla - Rainbows
- 17 June, 24 June, 1 July, 8 July, 22 July, 29 July and 5 August: Shinjuku Blues (Japanese: 新宿ブルース) - Hiroko Ohgi
- 15 July: Blue Chateau - Jackey Yoshikawa and His Blue Comets
- 12 August, 19 August, 2 September, 9 September, 16 September, 23 September, 30 September, 7 October, 14 October: Makkana Taiyō - Hibari Misora and the Blue Comets
- 4 November: Kiri No Kanatani (Japanese: 霧のかなたに) - Jun Mayuzumi
- 23 December: Love You Tokyo - Akira Kurosawa and Los Primos

Sega Enterprises

The following reached number 1 according to the weekly Sega Enterprises singles chart published in Billboard:

- 14 October: Makkana Taiyō - Hibari Misora and the Blue Comets
- 21 October and 28 October: Kiri No Kanatani (Japanese: 霧のかなたに) - Jun Mayuzumi

Original Confidence

The following reached number 1 according to the weekly Oricon singles chart published in Billboard:

- 18 November and 25 November: Kiri No Kanatani (Japanese: 霧のかなたに) - Jun Mayuzumi
- 2 December, 9 December, 16 December and 30 December: Love You Tokyo - Akira Kurosawa and Los Primos

Original Confidence (Local)

The following reached number 1 according to the weekly Oricon local singles chart published in Billboard:

- 11 November: Kiri No Kanatani (Japanese: 霧のかなたに) - Jun Mayuzumi

Original Confidence (International)

The following reached number 1 according to the weekly Oricon international singles chart published in Billboard:

- 11 November: Kiri No Kanatani (Japanese: 霧のかなたに) - Jun Mayuzumi

=== Oricon ===
The following reached number 1 on the weekly Oricon Singles Chart:

Issue date	Song	Artist(s)
2 November	"Kitaguni no Futari (In a Lonesome City)"	Jackey Yoshikawa and His Blue Comets
9 November	"Kitaguni no Futari (In a Lonesome City)"	Jackey Yoshikawa and His Blue Comets
16 November	"Love You Tokyo"	Los Primos
23 November	"Love You Tokyo"	Los Primos
30 November	"Love You Tokyo"	Los Primos
7 December	"Love You Tokyo"	Los Primos
14 December	"Love You Tokyo"	Los Primos
21 December	"Love You Tokyo"	Los Primos
28 December	"Love You Tokyo"	Los Primos

=== Cash Box ===
International

The following reached number 1 according to the weekly international singles chart published in Cash Box:

- 7 January, 14 January, 21 January, 28 January and 11 February: Yuhi Ga Naiteru - The Spiders
- 18 February and 25 February: Izuko-E - The Blue Comets.
- 4 March and 11 March: Gone The Rainbow - Peter, Paul and Mary
- 18 March and 25 March: Nantonaku Nantonaku - The Spiders
- 1 April, 8 April, 15 April and 22 April: Balla Balla - The Rainbows
- 29 April, 6 May, 13 May and 20 May: Land of a Thousand Dances - The Walker Brothers
- 27 May, 3 June and 10 June: Blue Chateau - The Blue Comets
- 24 June, 1 July and 8 July: Let's Go Shake (Japanese: レッツ・ゴー・シェイク) - The Bunnys
- 15 July, 22 July and 12 August: Seaside Bound - The Tigers
- 19 August, 26 August, 2 September, 9 September, 16 September and 23 September: Maria No Izumi - The Blue Comets
- 30 September and 7 October: "Sukisa Sukisa Sukisa" by The Carnabeats. This single was released in June.
- 14 October, 21 October, 28 October, 4 November and 11 November: Mona Liza's Smile by The Tigers This single was released on 20 August.
- 18 November, 25 November, 2 December, 9 December and 16 December: Kitaguni No Futari - The Blue Comets
- 23 December and 30 December: (Theme From) The Monkees - The Monkees

Local

The following reached number 1 according to the weekly local singles chart published in Cash Box:

- 7 January and 14 January: Yozora-O Aoi De - Yūzō Kayama
- 21 January: Konyawa Odorou - Ichiro Araki
- 28 January and 11 February: Mada-Minu Koibito - Yūzō Kayama
- 18 February: Blue Trumpet - Kazuo Funaki
- 4 March and 11 March: Kaeritakunai-No (Japanese: 帰りたくないの) - Mari Sono
- 18 March: Isshin Tasuke Edokko Matsuri (Japanese: 一心太助 江戸っ子祭り) - Kazuo Funaki
- 25 March, 1 April, 8 April, 15 April, 22 April, 29 April, 6 May and 13 May: Kimikoso Waga Inochi - Hiroshi Mizuhara
- 20 May, 27 May, 3 June and 10 June: Yogiriyo Konyamo Arigatou - Yūjirō Ishihara
- 24 June: Shinjuku Blues (Japanese: 新宿ブルース) - Hiroko Ohgi
- 1 July, 8 July and 15 July: Koyubi No Omoide - Yukari Itō
- 22 July: Shiritakunaino (I Really Don't Want to Know) - Yoh-ichi Sugawara
- 12 August, 19 August, 26 August, 2 September, 9 September, 16 September and 23 September: Makkana Taiyō - Hibari Misora
- 30 September, 7 October, 14 October, 21 October and 28 October: Yubue - Kazuo Funaki
- 4 November, 11 November and 18 November: Kitaguni-No Aoisora (Japanese: 北国の青い空) - Chiyo Okumura
- 25 November and 2 December: Anohito-No Ashioto (Japanese: あの人の足音) - Yukari Itō
- 9 December, 16 December, 23 December and 30 December: Love You Tokyo - Los Primos

== Number one albums ==
The following reached number 1 according to the weekly albums chart published in Cash Box:

- 28 October, 4 November, 11 November, 18 November, 25 November, 2 December, 9 December and 16 December: Let's Go Classics - The Bunnys. The Japanese name of this album is "Let's Go Unmei" (Japanese: レッツゴー「運命」). "Unmei" is a Japanese translation of the name of the Fate Symphony.
- 23 December and 30 December: The Tigers on Stage - The Tigers

== Annual charts ==
Yukio Hashi's Koi No Mexican Rock was number 1 in the Japanese kayokyoku annual singles chart published in Billboard.

== Film and television ==
The music of Chōhen Manga Shōnen Jack to Mahō Tsukai (Japanese: 長編漫画・少年ジャックと魔法使い), by Seiichrō Uno, won the 22nd Mainichi Film Award for Best Music.

Music Fair was broadcast in colour from 1 May 1967 onwards.

== Magazines ==
Oricon's magazine Confidence (Japanese: コンフィデンス) began in 1967.

== Genres ==
There was a group sounds boom. Bourdaghs said it was the leading genre. Honda said that jazz was less popular in 1967 than it had been before.

== Music industry ==
The value of records production was $96 million. For the first time in the post war period, Japanese musicians sold more records than foreigners. Oricon was established.

== Overseas ==
The Yomiuri Nippon Symphony Orchestra did a concert tour the United States. The Spiders toured the United States.

== Other singles released ==
- Tasogare No Akai Tsuki by Judy Ongg
- 5 February: "My Mary" by The Tigers
- 1 June: "Kimi Ni Aitai" by The Jaguars
- 15 July: Kaze Ga Naiteru by The Spiders
- 1 August: Barairo No Kumo by the Village Singers
- 15 September: Koi O Shiyoyo Jenny by The Carnabeats
- 5 October: "Dancing Lonely Night" (ダンシング・ロンリー・ナイト) by The Jaguars
- 10 October: Nijiiro no mizūmi by Akiko Nakamura
- 25 October: "Wasure-Enu Kimi" by The Tempters

== Albums released ==
- 1 February: "The Spiders Album No. 3" by The Spiders

== See also ==
- Timeline of Japanese music
- 1967 in Japan
- 1967 in music
- w:ja:1967年の音楽
