= 1966 in Japanese music =

In 1966 (Shōwa 41), Japanese music was released on records, and there were charts, awards, contests and festivals.

== Awards, contests and festivals ==
The 9th Osaka International Festival (Japanese: 大阪国際フェスティバル) was held from 12 April to 28 April 1966. The 8th Japan Record Awards were held on 24 December 1966. The 17th NHK Kōhaku Uta Gassen was held on 31 December 1966.

The 15th Otaka prize was won by Toshiro Mayuzumi.

== Number one singles ==
=== Billboard ===
The following reached number 1 according to weekly singles charts published in Billboard:

- 7 January and 5 March: Futari No Sekai - Yūjirō Ishihara (Theme song of the film Futari No Sekai)
- 19 March: Aitakute Aitakute - Mari Sono
- 26 March, 2 April, 9 April, 16 April, 23 April, 30 April, 7 May, 14 May and 21 May: Honemade Aishite - Takuya Jyo
- 28 May, 11 June, 18 June, 25 June, 2 July and 9 July: Kimi To Itsumademo - Yūzō Kayama
- 13 August, 20 August, 27 August and 3 September: Yogiri No Bojo - Yūjirō Ishihara (Basis of the film Yogiri No Bojo)
- 10 September, 17 September, 24 September, 1 October and 15 October: Kohkotsu No Blues - Mina Aoe
- 22 October, 29 October, 5 November, 12 November, 19 November, 26 November, 3 December, 10 December, 17 December, 24 December and 31 December: Yume Wa Yoru Hiraku - Ako Midorikawa (Crown) and Mari Sono (Polydor)

=== Cash Box ===
Local

The following reached number 1 according to the weekly local singles chart published in Cash Box:

- 1 January and 8 January: Namida No Renraku-sen - Harumi Miyako
- 15 January, 22 January and 29 January: Sayonara Wa Dance No Atode - Chieko Baisho
- 5 February, 12 February and 19 February: Sakaba Kouta (Japanese: 酒場小唄) - Keiko Matsuyama
- 26 February: Yawara - Hibari Misora
- 5 March: Aitakute Aitakute - Mari Sono
- 12 March, 19 March, 26 March, 2 April, 9 April, 16 April, 23 April, 30 April, 7 May, 14 May, 21 May, 28 May, 4 June, 11 June and 18 June: Kimi To Itsumademo - Yūzō Kayama
- 25 June, 2 July, 9 July and 16 July: Yuhi Wa Akaku (Japanese: 夕陽は赤く) - Yūzō Kayama
- 6 August, 13 August and 20 August: Oyome Ni Oide - Yūzō Kayama
- 27 August, 3 September, 10 September and 17 September: Hoshi No Flamenco - Teruhiko Saigō
- 24 September, 1 October and 8 October: Koi To Namida No Taito - Yukio Hashi
- 15 October: Nandemonai-Wa (Japanese: 何んでもないわ) - Mari Sono This song is the B side of Yasashii Ame
- 22 October: Zesshoh - Kazuo Funaki
- 29 October, 5 November, 12 November, 19 November, 26 November and 3 December: Yume Wa Yoru Hiraku - Mari Sono
- 10 December and 17 December: Yozora-O Aoi-De (Japanese: 夜空を仰いで) - Yūzō Kayama

International

The following reached number 1 according to the weekly international singles chart published in Cash Box:

- 1 January: Namida-Kun Sayonara - Johnny Tillotson (MGM) and Kyu Sakamoto (Toshiba)
- 8 January: Il Silenzio - Nini Rosso (Globe), Jorge Jouvin (Odeon) and Hiroshi Ashino (Toshiba)
- 15 January, 22 January, 29 January, 5 February, 12 February, 19 February, 26 February, 5 March and 12 March: Karelia - Feenades (Phillips) and The Spotnicks (Polydor)
- 19 March, 26 March and 2 April: We Can Work It Out - The Beatles
- 16 April and 23 April: Kungsleden - Soundtrack (of Kungsleden) (Seven Seas); Akira Fuse (King); Mahina Stars (Victor); and Antonio Koga (Colombia)
- 30 April and 7 May: L' Amour, C' Est Pour Rien - Enrico Macias (Odeon); Fubuki Koshiji (Toshiba); Yoko Kishi (King); Yoichi Sugawara (Polydor). The Japanese name of this song is "Koigokoro" (Japanese: 恋心).
- 14 May, 21 May, 28 May and 4 June: The Ballad of the Green Berets - Barry Sadler
- 11 June and 18 June: A Taste of Honey - Tijuana Brass (London) and The Ventures (Liberty)
- 25 June, 2 July, 9 July, 16 July, 6 August, 13 August and 20 August: Bara Ga Saita - Mike Maki (Phillips) and Johnny Tillotson (MGM)
- 27 August: Blue Eyes - Blue Comets
- 3 September: Paperback Writer - The Beatles
- 10 September, 17 September, 1 October and 8 October: Itsumademo, Itsumademo - The Savage
- 15 October, 22 October and 29 October: Wakamonotachi - The Broadside Four
- 5 November: Aoi Nagisa - The Blue Comets
- 12 November, 19 November, 26 November, 3 December, 10 December and 17 December: Yuhi Ga Naiteru - The Spiders

== Annual charts ==
Yukio Hashi's Muhyo was number 1 in the Japanese kayokyoku annual singles chart published in Billboard.

== Classical music ==
The Nagoya Philharmonic Orchestra was founded.

== Film and television ==
The music of The Face of Another, and Akogare (Japanese: あこがれ), by Tōru Takemitsu, won the 21st Mainichi Film Award for Best Music.

== Music industry ==
The value of records production was $88 million.

== Overseas ==
The Spiders toured Europe, departing from Japan on 24 October, and returning there on 14 November.

== Other singles released ==
- 5 November: Omoide No Nagisa by The Wild Ones

== Other albums released ==
- 5 January: Kayama Yuzo no Subete (Japanese: 加山雄三のすべて) by Yūzō Kayama

== See also ==
- Timeline of Japanese music
- 1966 in Japan
- 1966 in music
- w:ja:1966年の音楽
