= 8th Japan Record Awards =

1966 Japanese music awards ceremony

- Date: 24 December 1966
- Venue: Hibiya Public Hall

The 8th Japan Record Awards were held on 24 December 1966. Yukio Hashi became the first singer that get the 2nd JRA.

== Emcee ==
Ayuurou Miki

- 2nd time as the emcee for JRA.

== Award winners ==
Japan Record Award

- Yukio Hashi for "Muhyou"
  - 2nd award after 4 years.
  - Lyricist: Tetsuo Miyagawa
  - Composer: Ichirou Tone
  - Arranger: Yoshitaka Ichinose
  - Record Company: JVC Victor

Vocalist Award

- Kazuo Funaki for "Zesshou"

New Artist Award

- Ichirou Araki for "Sora Ni Hoshi Ga Aruyouni"
- Tokiko Kato for "Akai Fussen"

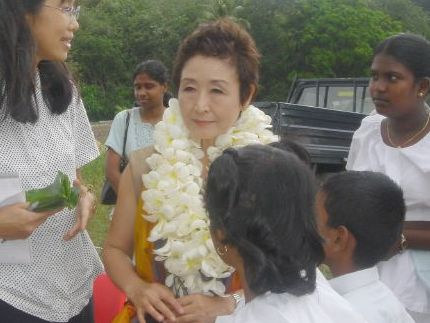
Tokiko Kato, New Artist Award awarder.

Composer Award

- Kuranosuke Hamaguchi for "Hoshi No Flamenco" and "Bara Ga Saita"
  - Singer: Teruhiko Saigō and Mike Maki

Arranger Award

- Kenichirou Morioka for "Kimi To Itsumademo" and "Aitakute Aitakute"
  - Singer: Yūzō Kayama and Mari Sono

Lyricist Award

- Tokiko Iwatani for "Aitakute Aitakute" and "Kimi To Itsumademo"
  - Singer: Mari Sono and Yūzō Kayama
  - 2nd award after 2 years.

Special Award

- Yūzō Kayama

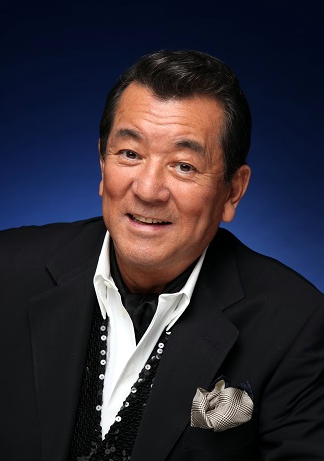
Yūzō Kayama, Special Award awarder.

Planning Award

- EMI Music Japan for "Nihon No Uta"
  - Singer: Duke Aces

Children's Song Award

- Susumu Ishikawa for "Obake No Q-Taro"

== Nominations ==
=== JRA ===
Song	Singer	Votes (1st Round)	Votes (final)
Muhyou	Yukio Hashi	16	23
Kimi To Itsumademo	Yūzō Kayama	12	16
Zusshou	Kazuo Funaki	6	0
Aitakute Aitakute	Mari Sono	Not mentioned.	0
Hoshi No Flamenco	Teruhiko Saigō	Not mentioned.	0
Bara Ga Saita	Mike Maki	Not mentioned.	0

=== Vocalist Award ===
Singer	Votes (1st Round)	Votes (Runner Up)	Votes (final round)
Kazuo Funaki	17	N/A	25
Mari Sono	10	20	14
Sumito Tachikawa	12	19	N/A
Teruhiko Saigō	0	N/A	N/A
Yūzō Kayama	0	N/A	N/A
Frank Nagai	0	N/A	N/A
Hibari Misora	0	N/A	N/A
Saburō Kitajima	0	N/A	N/A
Harumi Miyako	0	N/A	N/A
Teruko Hino	0	N/A	N/A
Yūjirō Ishihara	0	N/A	N/A

=== New Artist Award ===
Male

Singer	Votes
Ichirou Araki	26
Mike Maki	13
Shinichi Mori	N/A
Jackey Yoshikawa and His Blue Comets	N/A
B And B	N/A
Jirō Akagi	N/A
Jin Nakayama	N/A
The Savage	N/A
Henry Drennan	N/A

Female

Singer	Votes (first round)	Votes (final round)
Tokiko Kato	10	23
Mina Aoe	14	16
Ako Midorikawa	9	N/A
Mitsuko Baisho	6	N/A
Linda Yamamoto	0	N/A
Miyuki Kagajyou	0	N/A
Keiko Ōtori	0	N/A
Yoshiko Aki	0	N/A
Kyōko Katsura	0	N/A

=== Composer Award ===
Composer	Votes
Kuranosuke Hamaguchi	26
Yūzō Kayama	Not mentioned
Shousuke Ichikawa	Not mentioned
Hiroshi Miyagawa	Not mentioned
Doumei Suzuki	Not mentioned
Ben Sasaki	Not mentioned
Ichirou Araki	Not mentioned

=== Arranger Award ===
Arranger	Votes
Kenichirou Morioka	23
Norio Maeda	Not mentioned
Jinzou Kosugi	Not mentioned

=== Lyricist Award ===
Lyricist	Votes
Tokiko Iwatani	21
Meiko Nakamura	18
Naoya Uchimura	0
Kuranosuke Hamaguchi	0
Yaso Saijou	0
Tetsu Mizushima	0

=== Special Award ===
Singer	Votes
Yūzō Kayama	39 (All)

=== Planning Award ===
Company	Project	Votes
EMI Music Japan	Nihon No Uta	26
Universal Music Japan	Folk Rosen	13
EMI Music Japan	Roman Enka Rosen	0
JVC	Frank Nagai's Bojou	0

=== Children's Song Award ===
Song	Votes
Susumu Ishikawa's Obake No Q-Taro	21
Oto No Symphony	16
Watashi No Marionette	Not Mentioned
Tondetta Banana	Not Mentioned

== See also ==
- 1966 in Japanese music
