= List of Oricon number-one singles of 1968 =

The highest-selling singles in Japan are ranked in the Oricon Singles Chart, which is published by Oricon Style magazine. The data are compiled by Oricon based on each singles' physical sales. This list includes the singles that reached the number one place on that chart in 1968.

== Oricon Weekly Singles Chart ==
| Issue date | Song | Artist(s) | Ref. |
|---|---|---|---|
| January 4 | "Love You Tokyo" | Los Primos | |
| January 11 | "Love You Tokyo" | Los Primos | |
| January 18 | "Love You Tokyo" | Los Primos | |
| January 25 | "Kaette Kita Yopparai" | The Folk Crusaders | |
| February 1 | "Kaette Kita Yopparai" | The Folk Crusaders | |
| February 8 | "Kaette Kita Yopparai" | The Folk Crusaders | |
| February 15 | "Kaette Kita Yopparai" | The Folk Crusaders | |
| February 22 | "Kaette Kita Yopparai" | The Folk Crusaders | |
| February 26 | "Koi no Shizuku" | Yukari Itō | |
| March 4 | "Koi no Shizuku" | Yukari Itō | |
| March 11 | "Koi no Shizuku" | Yukari Itō | |
| March 18 | "Koi no Shizuku" | Yukari Itō | |
| March 25 | "Yūbe no Himitsu" | Tomoko Ogawa | |
| April 1 | "Massachusetts"; Japanese title: (マサチューセッツ) | Bee Gees | |
| April 8 | "Koi no Shizuku" | Yukari Itō | |
| April 15 | "Hana no Kubikazari / Ginga no Romance" | The Tigers | |
| April 22 | "Hana no Kubikazari / Ginga no Romance" | The Tigers | |
| April 29 | "Hana no Kubikazari / Ginga no Romance" | The Tigers | |
| May 6 | "Hana no Kubikazari / Ginga no Romance" | The Tigers | |
| May 13 | "Hana no Kubikazari / Ginga no Romance" | The Tigers | |
| May 20 | "Hana no Kubikazari / Ginga no Romance" | The Tigers | |
| May 27 | "Hana no Kubikazari / Ginga no Romance" | The Tigers | |
| June 3 | "Hoshikage no Waltz" | Masao Sen | |
| June 10 | "Hoshikage no Waltz" | Masao Sen | |
| June 17 | "Hoshikage no Waltz" | Masao Sen | |
| June 24 | "Hoshikage no Waltz" | Masao Sen | |
| July 1 | "Hoshikage no Waltz" | Masao Sen | |
| July 8 | "Emerald no Densetsu" | The Tempters | |
| July 15 | "Emerald no Densetsu" | The Tempters | |
| July 22 | "C C C" | The Tigers | |
| July 29 | "C C C" | The Tigers | |
| August 5 | "C C C" | The Tigers | |
| August 12 | "C C C" | The Tigers | |
| August 19 | "Hoshikage no Waltz" | Masao Sen | |
| August 26 | "C C C" | The Tigers | |
| September 2 | "C C C" | The Tigers | |
| September 9 | "The Sound of Silence"; Japanese title: (サウンド・オブ・サイレンス) | Simon & Garfunkel | |
| September 16 | "The Sound of Silence"; Japanese title: (サウンド・オブ・サイレンス) | Simon & Garfunkel | |
| September 23 | "Koi no Kisetsu" | Pinky & Killers | |
| September 30 | "Koi no Kisetsu" | Pinky & Killers | |
| October 7 | "Koi no Kisetsu" | Pinky & Killers | |
| October 14 | "Koi no Kisetsu" | Pinky & Killers | |
| October 21 | "Koi no Kisetsu" | Pinky & Killers | |
| October 28 | "Koi no Kisetsu" | Pinky & Killers | |
| November 4 | "Koi no Kisetsu" | Pinky & Killers | |
| November 11 | "Koi no Kisetsu" | Pinky & Killers | |
| November 18 | "Koi no Kisetsu" | Pinky & Killers | |
| November 25 | "Koi no Kisetsu" | Pinky & Killers | |
| December 2 | "Koi no Kisetsu" | Pinky & Killers | |
| December 9 | "Koi no Kisetsu" | Pinky & Killers | |
| December 16 | "Ima wa Shiawasekai" | Mitsuo Sagawa | |
| December 23 | "Koi no Kisetsu" | Pinky & Killers | |
| December 30 | "Koi no Kisetsu" | Pinky & Killers | |

== See also ==
- 1968 in Japanese music
