= 1968 in Japanese music =

In 1968 (Shōwa 43), Japanese music was released on records, and there were charts, awards, contests and festivals.

During that year, Japan had the third largest music market in the world.

== Awards, contests and festivals ==
The Tamla-Motown Festival, which was the first soul music festival, began on 12 February 1968. The 11th Osaka International Festival (Japanese: 大阪国際フェスティバル) was held from 11 April to 27 April 1968. The 10th Japan Record Awards were held on 21 December 1968. The 19th NHK Kōhaku Uta Gassen was held on 31 December 1968.

The 17th Otaka prize was won by Teizo Matsumura.

The Japan Cable Awards were first held in 1968. The Japan Lyricist Awards began in 1968.

== Number one singles ==
=== Oricon ===
The following reached number 1 on the weekly Oricon Singles Chart:

Issue date	Song	Artist(s)
January 4	"Love You Tokyo"	Los Primos
January 11	"Love You Tokyo"	Los Primos
January 18	"Love You Tokyo"	Los Primos
January 25	"Kaette Kita Yopparai"	The Folk Crusaders
February 1	"Kaette Kita Yopparai"	The Folk Crusaders
February 8	"Kaette Kita Yopparai"	The Folk Crusaders
February 15	"Kaette Kita Yopparai"	The Folk Crusaders
February 22	"Kaette Kita Yopparai"	The Folk Crusaders
February 26	"Koi no Shizuku"	Yukari Itō
March 4	"Koi no Shizuku"	Yukari Itō
March 11	"Koi no Shizuku"	Yukari Itō
March 18	"Koi no Shizuku"	Yukari Itō
March 25	"Yūbe no Himitsu"	Tomoko Ogawa
April 1	"Massachusetts"; Japanese title: (マサチューセッツ)	Bee Gees
April 8	"Koi no Shizuku"	Yukari Itō
April 15	"Hana no Kubikazari / Ginga no Romance"	The Tigers
April 22	"Hana no Kubikazari / Ginga no Romance"	The Tigers
April 29	"Hana no Kubikazari / Ginga no Romance"	The Tigers
May 6	"Hana no Kubikazari / Ginga no Romance"	The Tigers
May 13	"Hana no Kubikazari / Ginga no Romance"	The Tigers
May 20	"Hana no Kubikazari / Ginga no Romance"	The Tigers
May 27	"Hana no Kubikazari / Ginga no Romance"	The Tigers
June 3	"Hoshikage no Waltz"	Masao Sen
June 10	"Hoshikage no Waltz"	Masao Sen
June 17	"Hoshikage no Waltz"	Masao Sen
June 24	"Hoshikage no Waltz"	Masao Sen
July 1	"Hoshikage no Waltz"	Masao Sen
July 8	"Emerald no Densetsu"	The Tempters
July 15	"Emerald no Densetsu"	The Tempters
July 22	"C C C"	The Tigers
July 29	"C C C"	The Tigers
August 5	"C C C"	The Tigers
August 12	"C C C"	The Tigers
August 19	"Hoshikage no Waltz"	Masao Sen
August 26	"C C C"	The Tigers
September 2	"C C C"	The Tigers
September 9	"The Sound of Silence"; Japanese title: (サウンド・オブ・サイレンス)	Simon & Garfunkel
September 16	"The Sound of Silence"; Japanese title: (サウンド・オブ・サイレンス)	Simon & Garfunkel
September 23	"Koi no Kisetsu"	Pinky & Killers
September 30	"Koi no Kisetsu"	Pinky & Killers
October 7	"Koi no Kisetsu"	Pinky & Killers
October 14	"Koi no Kisetsu"	Pinky & Killers
October 21	"Koi no Kisetsu"	Pinky & Killers
October 28	"Koi no Kisetsu"	Pinky & Killers
November 4	"Koi no Kisetsu"	Pinky & Killers
November 11	"Koi no Kisetsu"	Pinky & Killers
November 18	"Koi no Kisetsu"	Pinky & Killers
November 25	"Koi no Kisetsu"	Pinky & Killers
December 2	"Koi no Kisetsu"	Pinky & Killers
December 9	"Koi no Kisetsu"	Pinky & Killers
December 16	"Ima wa Shiawasekai" (Japanese: 今は幸せかい)	Mitsuo Sagawa
December 23	"Koi no Kisetsu"	Pinky & Killers
December 30	"Koi no Kisetsu"	Pinky & Killers

=== Cash Box ===
International

The following reached number 1 according to the weekly international singles chart published in Cash Box:

- 6 January, 13 January and 20 January: (Theme From) The Monkees - The Monkees
- 27 January: Itsumademo Dokomademo - The Spiders
- 3 February and 10 February: Kimi Dakeni Ai-O - The Tigers
- 17 February, 24 February, 2 March, 9 March and 16 March: Kaette Kita Yopparai (I Only Live Twice) - The Folk Crusaders
- 23 March, 30 March, 6 April, 13 April, 20 April and 27 April: Massachusetts - Bee Gees
- 4 May, 11 May, 18 May and 25 May: Kamisama Onegai! - The Tempters. This single was released on 5 March 1968.
- 1 June, 8 June, 15 June, 22 June, 29 June, 6 July and 13 July: Hana No Kubikazari - The Tigers
- 3 August and 10 August: Emerald No Densetsu - The Tempters
- 17 August, 24 August, 31 August, 7 September, 14 September and 21 September: C C C - The Tigers
- 28 September and 5 October: The Sound of Silence - Simon & Garfunkel
- 12 October and 19 October: Koi no Kisetsu - Pinky & Killers
- 26 October, 2 November, 9 November, 23 November, 30 November, 7 December, 14 December and 21 December: Yuuzuki - Jun Mayuzumi
- 16 November: Haikyo No Hato - The Tigers

Local

The following reached number 1 according to the weekly local singles chart published in Cash Box:

- 6 January, 13 January, 20 January, 27 January, 3 February, 10 February and 17 February: Love You Tokyo - Los Primos
- 24 February, 2 March and 9 March: Nijiiro No Mizuumi - Akiko Nakamura
- 16 March, 23 March, 18 May and 25 May: Koi No Shizuku - Yukari Itō
- 30 March, 6 April, 13 April, 27 April, 4 May, 11 May: Yube No Himitsu - Tomoko Ogawa
- 1 June, 8 June, 15 June, 22 June, 29 June, 6 July, 13 July, 20 July, 3 August, 10 August, 24 August, 31 August, 7 September, 14 September and 21 September: Hoshikage No Waltz - Masao Sen
- 17 August: Otaru No Hito Yo - Tokyo Romantica
- 28 September: Shianbashi Blues - Colo-Ratinos
- 5 October and 12 October: Kiri Ni Musebu Yoru - Ken Kuroki
- 19 October: Yuuzuki - Jun Mayuzumi
- 26 October, 2 November, 9 November, 16 November, 23 November, 30 November, 7 December, 14 December and 21 December: Koi no Kisetsu - Pinky & Killers

== Number one albums and LPs ==
Cash Box

The following reached number 1 on the Cash Box albums chart:

- 20 July and 27 July: Sekai-Wa Bokura-O Matteiru - The Tigers This album is the soundtrack of the film Sekai-Wa Bokura-O Matteiru.
- 3 August, 10 August, 17 August, 24 August and 31 August: The Tempters First Album (Japanese: ザ・テンプターズ・ファースト・アルバム) - The Tempters
- 7 September: A.D. 2000 (Japanese: 紀元貮阡年) - The Folk Crusaders. This album was released on 10 July 1968.
- 19 October: The Golden Cups Album Vol 2 (Japanese: ザ・ゴールデン・カップス・アルバム第2集) - The Golden Cups
- 21 December: Folk Crusaders in Concert - The Folk Crusaders

== Annual charts ==
Masao Sen's Hoshikage no Waltz was number 1 in the Oricon annual singles chart. Akira Kurosawa & Los Primos' Love You Tokyo was number 1 in the Japanese kayokyoku annual singles chart published in Billboard.

== Film and television ==
The music of The Human Bullet and Gion Matsuri and Judge and Jeopardy, all by Masaru Sato, won the 23rd Mainichi Film Award for Best Music. Yoru no Hit Studio was first broadcast on 4 November 1968.

== Music industry ==
CBS/Sony was founded.

== Other singles released ==
- Swan No Namida by Ox
- Chiisana Snack by Purple Shadows
- 5 March: Anotoki Kimi Wa Wakakatta by The Spiders
- 5 May: Girl Friend by Ox
- 5 June: "Shinju No Namida" (Japanese: 真珠の涙) by The Spiders
- 15 June: Xanadu No Densetsu (Japanese: キサナドゥーの伝説) (The Legend of Xanadu) by The Jaguars
- 20 June: "Ai No Densetsu" (Japanese: 愛の伝説) by The Fingers
- 1 July: "Aisurutte Kowai" (Japanese: 愛するってこわい) by Jun & Nene
- 10 July: Hana No Young Town (Let's Go! Young Town) by The Wild Ones
- 1 September: Aisuru Kimi Ni by The Golden Cups
- 25 September: Hoshizora No Futari (Japanese: 星空の二人) by The Jaguars

== See also ==
- Timeline of Japanese music
- 1968 in Japan
- 1968 in music
- w:ja:1968年の音楽
