= 6th Japan Record Awards =

1964 Japanese music awards ceremony

- Date: 26 December 1964
- Venue: Hibiya Public Hall
- Website: http://www.jacompa.or.jp/reco6.html

The 6th Japan Record Awards were held on 26 December 1964.

== Emcee ==
Takayuki Akutagawa

- 5th time as the emcee of JRA.

== Award winners ==
Japan Record Award

- Kazuko Aoyama for "Ai To Shi O Mitsumete"
  - Lyricist: Hiroko Ōya
  - Composer: Keishirō Tsuchida
  - Arranger: Keishirō Tsuchida
  - Record Company: Nippon Columbia

Vocalist Award

- Youko Kishi for "Yoake No Uta"

New Artist Award

- Teruhiko Saigō for "Kimi Dake Wo" and "17-O No Kono Mune Ni"
- Harumi Miyako for "Anko Tsubaki Wa Koi No Hana"

Composer Award

- Hiroshi Miyagawa for "Una Sera Di Tokyo"
  - Singer: The Peanuts

Arranger Award

- Shinzou Teraoka for "Ozashiki Kouta"
  - Singer: Hiroshi Wada & Mahina Stars

Lyricist Award

- Tokiko Iwatani for "Una Sera Di Tokyo"
  - Singer: The Peanuts

Special Award

- Haruo Minami for "Tokyo Olympic Ondo"

Planning Award

- King Records for "Natsukashi No Asakusa Opera"

Children's Song Award

- Otowa Yurikago Kai for "One Two Three Go"

== Nominations ==
=== JRA ===
Song	Singer	Votes
Ai To Shi O Mitsumete	Kazuko Aoyama	Not mentioned.
Koi Wo Surunara	Yukio Hashi	Not mentioned, had a close vote number in runner-up.
Yoake No Uta	Youko Kishi	Not mentioned, had a close vote number in runner-up.
Una Sera Di Tokyo	The Peanuts	Not mentioned.
Una Sera Di Tokyo	Hiroshi Wada & Mahina Stars	Not mentioned.
Osaka Gurashi	Frank Nagai	Not mentioned.
Tokyo Blues	Sachiko Nishida	Not mentioned.
Ozashiki Kouta	Hiroshi Wada & Mahina Stars	Not mentioned.

=== New Artist Award ===
Male

Singer	Votes
Teruhiko Saigō	Not mentioned
Hachirou Izawa	Not mentioned
Mitsuo Kaji	Not mentioned

Female

Singer	Votes
Harumi Miyako	Not mentioned
Yumiko Kokonoe	Not mentioned
Teruko Hino	Not mentioned

== See also ==
- 1964 in Japanese music
