= 1964 in Japanese music =

In 1964 (Shōwa 39), Japanese music was released on records, and there were charts, awards, contests and festivals.

During that year, Japan had the third largest music market in the world.

== Awards, contests and festivals ==
The 7th Osaka International Festival (Japanese: 大阪国際フェスティバル) was held from 11 April to 4 May 1964. The 6th Japan Record Awards were held on 26 December 1964. The 15th NHK Kōhaku Uta Gassen was held on 31 December 1964.

== Number one singles ==
=== Billboard ===
The following reached number 1 according to weekly singles charts published in Billboard:

- 7 November, 14 November, 21 November, 28 November, 5 December, 12 December, 19 December and 26 December: Ozashiki Kouta - Mahina Stars and Matsuo Kazuko

Utamatic

The following reached number 1 according to the weekly Utamatic singles chart published in Billboard:

- 4 January and 25 January: Yuuhi No Oka - Yūjirō Ishihara and Ruriko Asaoka (Theme song of the film Yuuhi No Oka)
- 1 February, 8 February, 15 February, 22 February, 29 February, 7 March, 14 March, 21 March, 28 March, 4 April, 11 April, 18 April and 25 April: Washington Square - The Village Stompers
- 2 May, 9 May, 16 May, 23 May, 30 May, 6 June, 13 June, 20 June, 27 June, 4 July, 11 July, 18 July, 25 July, 1 August, 8 August, 15 August and 22 August: Tokyo Blues - Sachiko Nishida
- 29 August, 5 September, 12 September and 19 September: Movin' - Astronauts. The Japanese name of this song is Taiyo No Kanatani (Japanese: 太陽の彼方に).
- 26 September, 3 October, 10 October, 17 October, 24 October and 31 October: Ozashiki Kouta - Mahina Stars and Matsuo Kazuko

=== Cash Box ===
Japan's best sellers. Local. Japanese.

The following reached number 1 according to the weekly (non-international) Japan's best sellers singles chart, or local singles chart, or Japanese singles chart, published in Cash Box:

- 4 January: Shiroi Seifuku - Yukio Hashi
- 11 January, 18 January, 25 January and 1 February: Konnichiwa Akachan - Michiyo Azusa
- 8 February, 15 February, 22 February, 29 February and 7 March: Yumeo Sodate-yo (Japanese: 夢を育てよう) - Kyu Sakamoto This song was the B side of Ashita ga Arusa.
- 14 March, 4 April and 11 April: Nakamatachi (Japanese: 仲間たち) - Kazuo Funaki
- 21 March, 28 March and 18 April: Ah Seishun No Mune No Chi Wa (Japanese: あゝ青春の胸の血は) - Kazuo Funaki
- 9 May: Sugata Sanshiro (Japanese: 姿三四郎) - Hideo Murata
- 16 May, 23 May, 30 May and 20 June: Kimitachiga Ite Bokuga Ita (Japanese: 君たちがいて僕がいた) - Kazuo Funaki
- 6 June, 13 June and 27 June: Tokyo Blues - Sachiko Nishida
- 4 July, 11 July and 18 July: Kimidakeo - Teruhiko Saigō
- 25 July, 1 August, 8 August, 15 August, 22 August, 29 August, 5 September, 19 September, 26 September, 3 October, 10 October, 17 October, 24 October, 31 October and 7 November: Tokyo Olympic Ondo - Haruo Minami
- 14 November, 21 November, 28 November, 5 December, 12 December, 19 December and 26 December: Ozashiki Kouta - Mahina Stars and Matsuo Kazuko

International

The following reached number 1 according to the weekly international singles chart published in Cash Box:

- 4 January, 11 January, 18 January and 25 January: Be My Baby - The Ronettes, Johnny Deerfield (Columbia) Mieko Hirota (Toshiba) and Yukari Itō (King)
- 1 February, 8 February, 15 February, 22 February, 29 February and 7 March: Washington Square - The Village Stompers (Epic), Spike Jones (Liberty) and Paradise King (Toshiba)
- 14 March and 18 April: Live Young - Troy Donahue
- 21 March and 28 March. Let's Make a Memory - Cliff Richard
- 4 April and 11 April: Please Please Me - The Beatles
- 9 May, 16 May, 23 May: I Want to Hold Your Hand - The Beatles (Odeon) and Three Funkies (Toshiba)
- 30 May, 6 June and 13 June: She Loves You - The Beatles
- 20 June and 27 June: Hello, Dolly! - Louis Armstrong
- 4 July and 18 July: Navy Blue - Diane Renay (20th Century Fox), Aiko Ito (Victor), Yumiko Kokonoe (Toshiba) and Yukari Itō (King).
- 11 July: Movin' - Astronauts
- 25 July, 1 August, 8 August and 15 August: Viva Las Vegas - Elvis Presley and Blue Jeans
- 22 August, 29 August and 5 September: From Russia With Love - Kenny Ball (Pye), The Village Stompers (Epic) and Matt Monro (Liberty)
- 19 September, 26 September, 3 October and 10 October: Non ho l'età - Gigliola Cinquetti (Seven Seas) and Michiyo Azusa (King)
- 17 October, 24 October, 31 October, 7 November, 14 November and 21 November: A Hard Day's Night - The Beatles
- 28 November and 5 December: I Should Have Known Better - The Beatles
- 12 December, 19 December and 26 December: Soundtrack of La Ragazza Di Bube

== Annual charts ==
Kazuko Aoyama's Ai To Shi O Mitsumete (Japanese: 愛と死をみつめて) was number 1 in the Japanese kayokyoku annual singles chart published in Billboard.

== Film and television ==
The music of Assassination and Woman in the Dunes, by Tōru Takemitsu, won the 19th Mainichi Film Award for Best Music. The first broadcast of Music Fair was on 31 August 1964.

== Music industry ==
The Lon 3000 jukebox was produced.

== Other singles released ==
- 5 August: Koi Wo Suru Nara - Yukio Hashi

== History ==
The Nippon Budokan opened on 3 October 1964.

== See also ==
- Timeline of Japanese music
- 1964 in Japan
- 1964 in music
- w:ja:1964年の音楽
