= 10th Japan Record Awards =

1968 Japanese music awards ceremony

- Date: 21 December 1968
- Venue: Shibuya Public Hall

Television/radio coverage
- Network: TBS

The 10th Annual Japan Record Awards took place at the Shibuya Public Hall in Shibuya, Tokyo, on 21 December 1968, starting at 2:30PM JST. The ceremony were televised in Japan on TBS, and the video are the earliest recordings of JRA that saved by TBS.

== Emcee ==
- Ayurou Miki
  - 4th time as the emcee for JRA.

== Award winners ==
Japan Record Award

- Jun Mayuzumi for "Tenshi No Yuwaku"
  - Lyricist: Rei Nakanishi
  - Composer: Kunihiko Suzuki
  - Arranger: Kunihiko Suzuki
  - Record Company: EMI Music Japan

Vocalist Award

- Youichi Sugawara for "Dare Mo Inai"
- Mina Aoe for "Isezakicho Blues" and other songs.
- Masayoshi Tsuruoka & Tokyo Romantica for "Tabiji No Hito Yo"

New Artist Award

- Ken Yabuki for "Anata No Blues"
- Kaori Kumi for "Kuchizuke Ga Kowai"
- Pinky & Killers for "Koi No Kisetsu"

Lyricist Award

- Tetsurou Hoshino for "Tsuya Uta", "Ougizuka" and other lyrics.
  - Singer: Kiyoko Suizenji, Midori Sasa

Composer Award

- Taku Izumi for "Koi No Kisetsu" and other songs.
  - Singer: Pinky & Killers
  - Awarded again after 5 years, 2nd composer award.

Arranger Award

- Kenichirou Morioka for "Koi No Shizuku" & "Hana To Chou" and other arrangements.
  - Singer: Yukari Itou & Shinichi Mori
  - Awarded again after 2 years, 2nd arranger award.

Planning Award

- JVC for "Kage Wo Shitaite"
  - Awarded again after 3 years, 2nd planning award.
  - Singer: Shinichi Mori

Children's Song Award

- Yoshimi Hasegawa for "Peke No Uta"

Special Award

- Tadashi Yoshida
- Hachiro Kasuga
  - Song: Wakare No Ipponsugi
- Chiyoko Shimakura for "Ai No Sazanami" and other sentimental ballads.
- The Folk Crusaders for "Kaette Kita Yopparai"

10th Anniversary Commemorative Award

- Koga Masao
- Ryōichi Hattori

== See also ==
- 1968 in Japanese music
