= 1962 in Japanese music =

In 1962 (Shōwa 37), Japanese music was released on records, and there were charts, awards, contests and festivals.

== Awards, contests and festivals ==
The 5th Osaka International Festival (Japanese: 大阪国際フェスティバル) was held from 12 April to 5 May 1962. The 4th Japan Record Awards were held on 27 December 1962. The 13th NHK Kōhaku Uta Gassen was held on 31 December 1962.

The 11th Otaka prize was won by Akira Miyoshi.

== Number one singles ==
=== Billboard ===
Utamatic

The following reached number 1 according to the weekly Utamatic singles chart published in Billboard:

- 6 January: Ueo Muite Arukoo - Kyu Sakamoto
- 13 January, 20 January, 27 January, 3 February, 10 February, 17 February and 24 February: Koshu (Japanese: 湖愁) - Akira Matsushima
- 3 March, 10 March, 17 March, 24 March, 31 March, 14 April and 21 April: Ame No Hanazono (Japanese: 雨の花園) - Miki Nakasone (This is the B side of Kawa Wa Nagareru).
- 7 April, 28 April, 5 May, 12 May, 19 May, 26 May and 2 June: Eriko - Yukio Hashi
- 9 June, 16 June, 23 June, 30 June, 7 July and 14 July: Too Many Rules - Connie Francis. The Japanese name of this song is "Otona Ni Naritai" (大人になりたい).
- 21 July, 28 July, 4 August, 11 August, 18 August, 25 August, 1 September, 8 September, 15 September, 22 September, 29 September, 6 October, 13 October, 20 October, 27 October, 3 November, 10 November, 17 November, 24 November, 1 December, 8 December and 22 December: Ousho - Hideo Murata
- 15 December: Vacation - Connie Francis (MGM) and Michi Aoyama (Polydor)
- 29 December: L'Eclisse - Colletto Tempia (Japanese: コレット・テンピア) (Victor) and Mari Sono (Polydor)

=== Cash Box ===
Local

The following reached number 1 according to the weekly local singles chart published in Cash Box:

- 6 January, 20 January, 27 January, 3 February, 17 February, 24 February, 10 March and 17 March: Ueo Muite Arukoo - Kyu Sakamoto
- 3 March: Koshu (Japanese: 湖愁) - Akira Matsushima
- 24 March, 31 March, 7 April, 14 April, 21 April, 28 April, 5 May, 12 May, 19 May, 23 June and 30 June: Eriko - Yukio Hashi
- 26 May and 9 June: Yama Otoko No Uta - Dark Ducks (King) and Mitsuo Sagawa (Victor)
- 16 June: Aizen Katsura (Tabi No Yokaze) - Katsue Takaishi
- 7 July, 21 July, 28 July, 11 August, 18 August, 1 September, 8 September, 29 September, 10 November, 17 November, 24 November, 1 December and 15 December: Ousho - Hideo Murata (Columbia), Ichiro Mayama (King) and Mitsugoro Teppo (Teichiku)
- 14 July and 25 August: Hoshikuzu-no Machi (Japanese: 星屑の町) - Michiya Mihashi
- 4 August: Bungacha-Bushi (Japanese: ブンガチャ節) - Saburō Kitajima (Columbia) and Hiroshi Inuzuka (Teichiku)
- 6 October, 13 October, 20 October and 3 November: Wakai Yatsu - Yukio Hashi
- 8 December and 22 December: Itsudemo Yume O - Yukio Hashi

International

The following reached number 1 according to the weekly international singles chart published in Cash Box:

- 6 January, 13 January, 20 January, 27 January, 3 February and 17 February: Moliendo Café - Sachiko Nishida (Polydor), Hugo Blanco (Polydor), Shoichiro Matsumiya (Japanese: 松宮庄一郎) (Toshiba) and Ray Anthony (Capitol). The Japanese language cover version of this song is called Coffee Rumba.
- 10 February, 24 February, 3 March, 10 March and 17 March: You Don't Know - Helen Shapiro (Columbia), Mieko Hirota (Toshiba) and Midori Tashiro (Teichiku). The Japanese name of this song is "Kanashiki Kataomoi" (悲しき片想い) and it is sometimes the B side of Don't Treat Me Like a Child (Japanese: 子供じゃないの).
- 24 March: (Marie's the Name) His Latest Flame - Elvis Presley
- 31 March, 7 April and 14 April: Oh My Darling, Clementine - The Browns (Victor) and Jimmie Tokita (King)
- 21 April: Going Home To Mary Lou - Neil Sedaka
- 28 April, 5 May, 12 May: Hats Off to Larry - Del Shannon (Atlantic), Kyu Sakamoto (Toshiba) and Hisahiko Iida (Columbia) The Japanese name of this song is "Hanasaku Machikado" (花咲く街角).
- 19 May and 26 May: Tonight - Richard Beymer (Columbia), Ferrante & Teicher (United Artists), Don Mackey, Peggy Hayama (King)
- 9 June, 16 June, 23 June, 30 June, 7 July, 14 July, 21 July, 28 July, 4 August and 11 August: Pretty Little Baby (Too Many Rules) - Connie Francis (MGM), Kayoko Moriyama (Toshiba), Kumiko Goto (Columbia), Yukari Itō (King), Ririko Sawa (Japanese: 沢リリ子) (Teichiku) and Mie Nakao (Victor)
- 18 August, 25 August, 8 September and 20 October: Young World - Ricky Nelson (Imperial), Keijiro Yamashita (Toshiba) and Six Joes (Japanese: シックス・ジョーズ) (Victor)
- 1 September: Blue Hawaii - Elvis Presley (Victor), Kaoru Minami (King) and Masayuki Hori (King)
- 29 September, 6 October and 13 October: Good Luck Charm - Elvis Presley (Victor) and Masayuki Hori (King)
- 3 November, 10 November, 17 November, 24 November, 1 December, 8 December, 15 December and 22 December: I Can't Stop Loving You - Ray Charles (ABC Paramount) Takashi Shikauchi (King) and Frank Akagi (Polydor)

== Annual charts ==
Yukio Hashi and Sayuri Yoshinaga's Itsudemo Yume O (Japanese: いつでも夢を) was number 1 in the Japanese kayokyoku annual singles chart published in Billboard.

== Classical music ==
The Yomiuri Nippon Symphony Orchestra was established.

== Film and television ==
The music of Harakiri and Pitfall, by Tōru Takemitsu, won the 17th Mainichi Film Award for Best Music.

Shichiji ni aimashō was first broadcast on 7 April 1962.

== Other singles released ==
- Furimukanaide by The Peanuts

== See also ==
- Timeline of Japanese music
- 1962 in Japan
- 1962 in music
- w:ja:1962年の音楽
