= Raisonné =

Compilation album by Wink
- Released: December 21, 1992
- Recorded: 1988–1992
- Genre: J-pop; dance-pop
- Length: 66:34
- Language: Japanese
- Label: Polystar
- Producer: Haruo Mizuhashi

Wink chronology
Nocturne (Yasōkyoku) (1992)	Raisonné (1992)	Aphrodite (1993)

Raisonné: Complete Single Collection (レゾネ, Rezone) is the second compilation album by Japanese idol duo Wink, released by Polystar on December 21, 1992. It covers the duo's singles from 1988 to 1992.

The album peaked at No. 18 on Oricon's albums chart and sold over 58,000 copies.

== Track listing ==
All lyrics are written by Neko Oikawa, except where indicated; all music is arranged by Satoshi Kadokura, except where indicated.

No.	Title	Lyrics	Music	Arrangement	Length
1.	"Yoru ni Hagurete (Where Were You Last Night)" ((夜にはぐれて 〜Where Were You Last Night〜))		Norell Oson Bard		4:25
2.	"Manatsu no Tremolo" (Manatsu no Toremoro (真夏のトレモロ, "Midsummer Tremolo"))		Takashi Kudō		4:05
3.	"Ai ga Tomaranai (Turn It into Love)" ((愛が止まらない 〜TURN IT INTO LOVE〜, "Love Doesn't Stop ~Turn It into Love~"))		Mike Stock; Matt Aitken; Pete Waterman	Motoki Funayama	3:31
4.	"One Night in Heaven (Mayonaka no Angel)" ((One Night In Heaven 〜真夜中のエンジェル〜, "One Night in Heaven ~Midnight Angel~"))	Takashi Matsumoto	Steve Lironi; Dan Navarro	Funayama	4:06
5.	"Samishii Nettaigyo" ((淋しい熱帯魚, "Lonely Tropical Fish"))		Masaya Ozeki	Funayama	4:29
6.	"Real na Yume no Jōken" (Riaru na Yume no Jōken (リアルな夢の条件, "Real Dream Conditions"))		Osny S. Melo		4:38
7.	"Sexy Music"		Ben Findon; Mike Myers; Bob Puzey		3:41
8.	"Furimukanaide" ((ふりむかないで, "Don't Look Back"))	Tokiko Iwatani	Hiroshi Miyagawa		4:07
9.	"Namida wo Misenai de (Boys Don't Cry)" ((涙をみせないで～Boys Don't Cry～, "Don't Show Your Tears"))		Matjaž Kosi	Funayama	3:43
10.	"Matenrō Museum" (Matenrō Myūjiamu (摩天楼ミュージアム, "Skyscraper Museum"))		Kudō		4:15
11.	"New Moon ni Aimashou" (Nyū Mūn ni Aimashō (ニュー・ムーンに逢いましょう, "Meet the New Moon"))		Yuki Kadokura		4:23
12.	"Haitoku no Scenario" (Haitoku no Shinario (背徳のシナリオ, "An Immoral Scenario"))		Kudō		4:26
13.	"Amaryllis" (Amaririsu (アマリリス))	Yukinojo Mori	Ken Satō	Shigeru Suzuki	3:55
14.	"Kitto Atsui Kuchibiru (Remain)" (Kitto Atsui Kuchibiru ~Rimein~ (きっと熱いくちびる 〜リメイン〜, "I'm Sure It's Hot (Remain)"))		Anri Sekine		4:39
15.	"Tsuioku no Heroine" (Tsuioku no Hiroin (追憶のヒロイン, "Reminiscent Heroine"))		Y. Kadokura		4:21
16.	"Sugar Baby Love"	Joe Lemon	Wayne Bickerton; Tony Waddington	Shirō Sagisu	3:50
Total length:					66:34

== Charts ==
Chart (1992)	Peak position
Japanese Albums (Oricon)	18
