= Yamaha Popular Song Contest =

Japanese popular music contest

The Yamaha Popular Song Contest (ヤマハポピュラーソングコンテスト, Yamaha Popyurā Songu Kontesuto), generally known as Popcon (ポプコン, Popukon), was a Japanese popular music contest which ran from 1969 to 1986. It was sponsored by the Yamaha Music Foundation and was held annually (later, twice a year) at the Yamaha Resort Tsumagoi in Kakegawa, Shizuoka, Japan.

The grand prix winners were to be qualified for the World Popular Song Festival.

== History ==
- 1969: The first competition, as the '69 Composition Concours ('69作曲コンクール, '69 Sakkyoku Konkūru), took place at the Yamaha Resort Nemu no Sato (ヤマハリゾート合歓の郷, Yamaha Rizōto Nemu no Sato) in Shima, Mie, Japan.
- 1972: The contest was renamed Popular Song Contest (ポピュラーソングコンテスト, Popyurā Songu Kontesuto).
- 1973: From this year, the event was held twice a year.
- May 1974: The contest venue was changed to the Yamaha Resort Tsumagoi (ヤマハリゾートつま恋) from this year.
- May 1984: Due to a gas explosion in Tsumagoi the previous year, the Nakano Sun Plaza temporarily hosted the event.
- September 1986: The 32nd competition was held as the final Popcon event.
- 1987: Teens Music Festival (ティーンズミュージックフェスティバル, Tīnzu Myūjikku Fesutibaru) replaced the Popcon.

== Notable participants ==
The following professional singers have won in some division of awards.

- Junko Yagami (1974)
- Miyuki Nakajima (1975)
- Motoharu Sano (1978)
- Tsuyoshi Nagabuchi (1978)
- Frecuencia Mod (1978)
- Chage and Aska (1979)
- Crystal King (1979)
- Aming (1982)
- Tom Cat (1983)
- Akino Arai (1984)

== Winners ==
=== 1st Composition Concours (1969) ===
At the Nemu no Sato Yamaha Music Hall, on November 23, 1969.

- Grand Prix
  - Jun Mayuzumi

=== 2nd Composition Concours (1970) ===
At the Nemu no Sato Indoor Hall, on November 5, 1970

- Grand Prix
  - Mieko Hirota

=== 3rd Composition Concours (1971) ===
At the Nemu no Sato Outdoor Hall, on October 9, 1971

- Grand Prix
  - Hide and Rosanna

=== 4th Popcon (1972) ===
At the Nemu no Sato Outdoor Hall, on October 8, 1972

- Grand Prix
  - Chewing Gum, folk duo
- Awards
  - Yōsui Inoue
  - Yumiko Kokonoe

=== 5th Popcon (1973) ===
At the Nemu no Sato Outdoor Hall, on May 20, 1973

=== 6th Popcon (1973) ===
At the Nemu no Sato Outdoor Hall, on October 13, 1973

- Awards
  - Akiko Kosaka

=== Popcon Grand Prix '73 (1973) ===
At the Nemu no Sato Outdoor Hall, on October 14, 1973

- Grand Prix
  - Kouichi Ise and Manji
  - Akiko Kosaka

=== 7th Popcon (1974) ===
At the Tsumagoi Exhibition Hall, on May 5, 1974

- Grand Prix
  - Kyoko Kosaka
- Top Prizes
  - Akira Yamazaki
  - Yuki Katsuragi

=== 8th Popcon (1974) ===
At the Tsumagoi Exhibition Hall, on October 13, 1974

- Chewing Gum

=== 9th Popcon (1975) ===
At the Tsumagoi Exhibition Hall, on May 18, 1975

- Grand Prix
  - Shichifukujin
- Best Song Award
  - Shigeru Matsuzaki
- Awards
  - Miyuki Nakajima

=== 10th Popcon (1975) ===
At the Tsumagoi Exhibition Hall, on October 12, 1975

- Grand Prix
  - Miyuki Nakajima
- Best Song Award
  - Akira Inaba (composer)

=== 11th Popcon (1976) ===
At the Tsumagoi Exhibition Hall, on May 16, 1976

- Grand Prix
  - Sandii
- Best Son Award
  - Yukio Sasaki

=== 12th Popcon (1976) ===
At the Tsumagoi Exhibition Hall, on October 3, 1976

- Grand Prix
  - White House II

=== 13th Popcon (1977) ===
At the Tsumagoi Exhibition Hall, on May 8, 1977

=== 14th Popcon (1977) ===
At the Tsumagoi Exhibition Hall, on October 2, 1977

- Grand Prix
  - Masanori Sera & Twist

=== 15th Popcon (1978) ===
At the Tsumagoi Exhibition Hall, on May 7, 1978

- Grand Prix
  - U・U
- Best Song Award
  - Motoharu Sano
- Award
  - Tsuyoshi Nagabuchi and Salty dog

=== 16th Popcon (1978) ===
At the Tsumagoi Exhibition Hall, on October 1, 1978

- Grand Prix
  - Hiroshi Madoka
- Best Song Award
  - Yūko Ōtomo
- Highest Award
  - Monroes
- Awards
  - Chage and Aska
  - Crystal King
  - S.E.N.S.

=== 17th Popcon (1979) ===
At the Tsumagoi Exhibition Hall, on May 6, 1979

- Best Song Award
  - Ippei Suzuki
- Awards
  - Chage and Aska
  - C. W. Nicol and his friends
  - Chizuru Matsunaga (Try-Tone)

=== 18th Popcon (1979) ===
At the Tsumagoi Exhibition Hall, on October 7, 1979

- Grand Prix
  - Crystal King
- Best Song Awards
  - Hironori Kaneko
  - Gypsy and Arere no Re (the current Stardust Revue)

=== 19th Popcon (1980) ===
At the Tsumagoi Exhibition Hall, on May 11, 1980

- Grand Prix
  - Tomoya Itami & Side by Side (Tomoya Itami and Tomoji Sogawa)
- Awards
  - Haruhi Aiso
  - Cutie Panchos

=== 20th Popcon (1980) ===
At the Tsumagoi Exhibition Hall, on October 5, 1980

- Grand Prix
  - Eddy Yamamoto

=== 21st Popcon (1981) ===
At the Tsumagoi Exhibition Hall, on May 10, 1981

- Grand Prix
  - Toshihiro Itoh

=== 22nd Popcon (1981) ===
At the Tsumagoi Exhibition Hall, on October 4, 1981

- Grand Prix
  - Aladdin
- Award
  - Yuiko Tsubokura
- Kawakami Prize
  - Megumi Shiina

=== 23rd Popcon (1982) ===
At the Tsumagoi Exhibition Hall, on May 16, 1982

- Grand Prix
  - Aming
- Best Song Award
  - Asqua
- Kawakami Award
  - Carlos Torres & the Sweet Dreams

=== 24th Popcon (1982) ===
At the Tsumagoi Exhibition Hall, on October 3, 1982

=== 25th Popcon (1983) ===
At the Tsumagoi Exhibition Hall, on May 15, 1983

=== 26th Popcon (1983) ===
At the Tsumagoi Exhibition Hall, on October 2, 1983

- Grand Prix
  - Midori Karashima

=== 27th Popcon (1984) ===
At the Nakano Sun Plaza, on May 13, 1984

=== 28th Popcon (1984) ===
At the Tsumagoi Exhibition Hall, on October 7, 1984

- Grand Prix
  - Tom Cat
- Best Song Award
  - Sway
- Award
  - Akino Arai

=== 29th Popcon (1985) ===
At the Tsumagoi Exhibition Hall, on May 12, 1985

=== 30th Popcon (1985) ===
At the Tsumagoi Exhibition Hall, on October 6, 1985

- Grand Prix
  - Kazuyuki Ozaki & Coastal City
- Best Song Award
  - Rika

=== 31st Popcon (1986) ===
At the Tsumagoi Exhibition Hall, on May 11, 1986

- Award
  - Jinnouchi Taizō

=== 32nd Popcon (1986) ===
At the Tsumagoi Exhibition Hall, on September 29, 1986

== See also ==
- Yamaha Music Festival
