= Osamu Yoshioka =

- Born: February 19, 1934; Yamaguchi Prefecture, Japan
- Died: May 17, 2010 (aged 76)
- Genre: Kayōkyoku
- Occupation: Lyricist
- Years active: 1956–2010

Osamu Yoshioka (吉岡 治, Yoshioka Osamu; February 19, 1934 – May 19, 2010) was a renowned Japanese lyricist. Vice-president of the Japan Lyricists' Association. Earlier he used the pen name "吉岡オサム" (pronounced the same).

== Songs with lyrics by Yoshioka ==
=== Kayōkyoku ===
- Kazuhiko Shima "Etsuraku no Blues" (悦楽のブルース)
- Sayuri Ishikawa "Hatoba Shigure" (波止場しぐれ), "Amagigoe" (天城越え), "Meoto Zenzai" (夫婦善哉), "Taki no Shiraito" (滝の白糸)
- Seri Ishikawa "Hachigatsu no Nureta Suna" (八月の濡れた砂)
- Hiroshi Itsuki "Sasame-yuki" (細雪)
- Eisaku Ōkawa "Sazanka no Yado" (さざんかの宿)
- Miyuki Kawanaka "Hanasaki Minato" (花咲港), "Echizen Misaki" (越前岬), "Shinobu-gawa" (忍ぶ), "Naniwa-akari" (浪花灯り)
- Eiko Segawa "Inochi Kurenai" (命くれない)
- Kaoru Chiga "Mayonaka no Guitar" (真夜中のギター)
- Kenji Niinuma "Nasake-gawa" (情け川)
- Nobue Matsubara "Enka Michi" (演歌みち)
- Hibari Misora "Makkana Taiyō" (真赤な太陽), "Ryōmazan'ei" (龍馬残影)
- Harumi Miyako (さよなら海峡), "Ōsaka Shigure" (大阪しぐれ), Otaru Unga (小樽運河)
- Shin'ichi Mori "Hakusetsu Kusa" (薄雪草)
- George Yamamoto "Toki wa Nagarete mo" (時は流れても)
- The King Tones (Tatsurō Yamashita) "Let's Dance Baby" (LET' S DANCE BABY)
- Cute "Edo no Temari Uta II"
- Hiroyuki Okita "Kimi Ni Sasageru Lullaby" (Captain Tsubasa)

=== Nursery songs ===
- "Omocha no cha-cha-cha" (おもちゃのチャチャチャ), co-lyricist with Akiyuki Nosaka

== Awards ==
- 1989: 31st Japan Record Awards — Lyrics Award — for Akari Uchida's "Kōshoku Ichidai Onna" (好色一代女)
- 1980: 13th Japan Lyrics Award — for Miyako Harumi's "Ōsaka Shigure" (大阪しぐれ)
- 1990: 23rd Japan Versification Award — for Sayuri Ishikawa's "Utakata" (うたかた)
- 2003:
  - 36th Japan Versification Award — for Miyuki Kawanaka's "Onna no Isshō (Ase no Hana)" (おんなの一生～汗の花～)
  - Medal with Purple Ribbon
