= Rei Nakanishi =

Japanese writer (1938–2020)

- なかにし 礼
- Born: 2 September 1938; Mudanjiang, Manchukuo
- Died: 23 December 2020 (aged 82); Tokyo, Japan
- Education: Kudan High School
- Alma mater: Rikkyo University
- Occupations: Novelist and songwriter
- Writing career
- Notable work: Kyōdai
- Notable awards: Naoki Prize
- Website: home page (Japanese)

Rei Nakanishi (なかにし 礼, Nakanishi Rei; 2 September 1938 – 23 December 2020) was a Japanese novelist and songwriter. He won the 122nd Naoki Prize.

== Career ==
Nakanishi was born Reizō Nakanishi (中西 禮三) in Mudanjiang, Manchukuo. He graduated from Kudan High School in Tokyo and received a degree in French literature from Rikkyo University. He lived in Zushi, Kanagawa.

He first worked on translations of French chanson songs, but while on honeymoon, he made the acquaintance of Yujiro Ishihara and became a Japanese popular song (kayōkyoku) writer. He is one of the main lyricists in the world of post-World War II kayōkyoku. He gave the world an extensive collection of works—songs such as "Kyou de owakare" and "Kita sakaba", which became big hits, but also a large proportion of unusual songs. In 1969, his total sales exceeded 10 million records. He has displayed talent in many fields, including concert and stage production, movie performance, singing, composing, translation, novel and essay writing, and cultural broadcasting (as a personality on "Sei! Yangu!" and as a regular on NHK's "N-kyō").

However, behind his showy life, he suffered from difficulties such as heart disease, divorce, and having to repay his elder brother's extensive debts. From those personal experiences came novels such as Kyōdai and Sakura no densetsu. He was a pacifist and desired reconciliation with China and Korea, and this shows in his writing style and speech.

He gave up songwriting at the end of the Shōwa era, and concentrated on opera production and performance and novel and essay writing. Kyōdai was nominated in 1998 for the 119th Naoki Prize. Nagasaki burabura-setsu won the 122nd Naoki Prize in 2000.

Recently, Nakanishi appeared as a commentator on the Japanese "wide show" Wide! Scramble! on the Asahi Television Network.

Nakanishi died in Tokyo on 23 December 2020, at the age of 82, after suffering a heart attack.

== Awarded Songs ==
Year	Award	Song	Category	Singer
1967 (Showa 42)	9th Japan Record Awards	Kiri No Kanatani	Lyricist Award	Jun Mayuzumi
1967 (Showa 42)	9th Japan Record Awards	Koi No Fugue	Lyricist Award	The Peanuts
1968 (Showa 43)	10th Japan Record Awards	Tenshi No Yuwaku	Japan Record Award	Jun Mayuzumi
1968 (Showa 43)	10th Japan Record Awards	Dare Mo Inai	Vocalist Award	Sugawara Yoichi
1968 (Showa 43)	10th Japan Record Awards	Kuchitsuke Ga Kowai	New Artist Award	Kaori Kumi
1968 (Showa 43)	10th Japan Record Awards	Ai No Sazanami	Special Award	Chiyoko Shimakura
1969 (Showa 44)	11th Japan Record Awards	Minatomachi Blues	Best Vocalist	Shinichi Mori
1969 (Showa 44)	11th Japan Record Awards	Yoru To Asa No Aida Ni	Best New Artist	Peter
1969 (Showa 44)	11th Japan Record Awards	Ningyō No Ie	Vocalist Award	Mieko Hirota
1970 (Showa 45)	12th Japan Record Awards	Kyou De Owakare	Japan Record Award	Sugawara Yoichi
1970 (Showa 45)	12th Japan Record Awards	Tegami	Vocalist Award	Saori Yuki
1970 (Showa 45)	12th Japan Record Awards	Hatoba Onna No Blues	Vocalist Award	Shinichi Mori
1970 (Showa 45)	12th Japan Record Awards	Drift No Zundokobushi	General Public Award	The Drifters
1970 (Showa 45)	12th Japan Record Awards	Showa Onna Blues	Lyricist Award	Mina Aoe
1971 (Showa 46)	13th Japan Record Awards	Ame Ga Yandara	Composer Award	Yukiji Asaoka
1975 (Showa 50)	17th Japan Record Awards	Kokoro No Kori	Best New Artist	Takashi Hosokawa
1980 (Showa 55)	22nd Japan Record Awards	Santa Maria No Inori	Gold Award	Hideki Saijo
1980 (Showa 55)	22nd Japan Record Awards	Anata Iro No Manon	New Artist Award	Yoshimi Iwasaki
1982 (Showa 57)	24th Japan Record Awards	Kita Sakaba	Japan Record Award	Takashi Hosokawa
1982 (Showa 57)	24th Japan Record Awards	Kita Sakaba	Gold Award	Takashi Hosokawa
1989 (Heisei 1)	22nd Japan Lyricist Awards	Kaze No Bon Koi Uta	Grand Prix	Sayuri Ishikawa
