= Ōsaka Shigure =

1980 single by Harumi Miyako

Single by Harumi Miyako
- Language: Japanese
- B-side: "Onna Koiuta"
- Released: February 1, 1980
- Genre: Enka
- Label: Nippon Columbia
- Composer: Shōsuke Ichikawa
- Lyricist: Osamu Yoshioka

"Ōsaka Shigure" (大阪しぐれ; autumn rain in Osaka) is the 82nd single released by Japanese singer Harumi Miyako through the record label Nippon Columbia. The single was released on 1 February 1980 and is considered one of Miyako's most famous songs, selling over one million copies.

== Composition ==
"Ōsaka Shigure" is written in Miyako's signature enka style, and the lyrics are about a melancholic woman after a heartbreak. The title is a combination of the city Osaka and "shigure" (時雨), which refers to light rain showers in late autumn and early winter. The lyrics reference Kitashinchi (北新地), Dōjima (堂島), and Sonezaki (曽根崎), which are all neighborhoods in Kita-ku, Osaka that are known for their bars and nightlife.

== Chart performance ==
This song reached number 2 on the Oricon Singles Chart.

== Impact ==
"Ōsaka Shigure" performed well on the Oricon Singles Chart. The single was the 49th best-selling single in 1980, and then outperformed itself by ranking 6th in 1981. "Ōsaka Shigure" also saw positive reviews from critics. The song was the winner of the "Best Vocal Performance" category at the 22nd Japan Record Awards. The lyricist of the song, Osamu Yoshioka, won the 13th Japan Lyricist Awards for this song. Miyako was also invited to the 31st Kōhaku Uta Gassen to perform this song, a television show on New Year's Eve which is considered a major honor for a Japanese musician. This performance was Miyako's 16th time appearing on the show. The single is one of the six singles by Miyako that have sold over a million copies, at 1.14 million sold.

Many other artists have included cover versions of "Ōsaka Shigure" in their own albums. Notable examples include Hibari Misora in her 1982 album Hitokoizake (人恋酒) and Kaori Kozai in her 1995 album Tsuzureori Hyakei Vol. 5: Ōsaka Monogatari (綴織百景 Vol.5 大阪物語). Miyuki Hatakeyama also sang this song in the 2020 album Miyako Harumi o Sukininatta Hito (都はるみを好きになった人), an album released as a tribute to Miyako.

== Track listing ==
| No. | Title | Lyrics | Music | Arrangement | Length |
|---|---|---|---|---|---|
| 1. | "Ōsaka Shigure" (大阪しぐれ) | Osamu Yoshioka | Shōsuke Ichikawa | Tsuneō Saitō |
| 2. | "Onna Koiuta" (おんな恋唄) | Keiko Yūki | Jun Suzuki | Makoto Saeki |

== See also ==
- 1980 in Japanese music
