= 1960 in Japanese music =

In 1960 (Shōwa 35), Japanese music was released on records and included in films, and there were awards, contests and festivals.

== Awards, contests and festivals ==
The 3rd Osaka International Festival (Japanese: 大阪国際フェスティバル) was held from 6 April to 8 May 1960. The 2nd Japan Record Awards were held on 28 December 1960. The 11th NHK Kōhaku Uta Gassen was held on 31 December 1960.

The 9th Otaka prize was won by Akio Yashiro for his cello concerto.

== Annual charts ==
Yukio Hashi's Itako Gasa was number 1 in the Japanese kayokyoku annual singles chart published in Billboard. The Peanuts' Kanashiki 16 Sai and Kikue Hanamura's Itako Hanayome San were respectively numbers 4 and 5.

== Classical music ==
The Tokyo Kosei Wind Orchestra was founded.

== Film ==
The music of The Bad Sleep Well and Chikuhō no Kodomo Tachi and Dokuritsu Gurentai Nishi e, all by Masaru Sato, won the 15th Mainichi Film Award for Best Music.

Film musicals included Alakazam the Great, Taiyo Dake (太陽を抱け), Utamatsuri Romansu Dochu (唄祭ロマンス道中) and Arashi O Yobu Gakudan (嵐を呼ぶ楽団).

== Theatre ==
Musicals included "Miagete Goran Yoru no Hoshi o". (The theme song is Miagete Goran Yoru no Hoshi o).

== Jukeboxes ==
The Sega 1000 jukebox appeared.

== Music industry ==
There were 5,616 new record releases.

== Other singles released ==
- Aishū Hatoba by Hibari Misora
- Okesa Utaeba and Kenka Fuji by Yukio Hashi

== Songs ==
- Inu No Omawarisan

== See also ==
- Timeline of Japanese music
- 1960 in Japan
- 1960 in music
- w:ja:1960年の音楽
