= 22nd Japan Record Awards =

1980 Japanese music awards ceremony

- Date: 31 December 1980
- Location: Imperial Theatre, Tokyo, Japan
- Hosted by: Keizō Takahashi
- Website: http://www.tbs.co.jp/recordaward/

Television/radio coverage
- Network: Tokyo Broadcasting System Television

The 22nd Japan Record Awards ceremony was held on 31 December 1980 at the Imperial Theatre, Tokyo, and was broadcast live in Japan through the Tokyo Broadcasting System Television network. The broadcast ran from 19:00 (JST) to 20:55 (JST).

The 22nd Japan Record Award went to Aki Yashiro for "Ame no Bojō", and Best Vocal Performance went to Harumi Miyako for "Ōsaka Shigure".

The audience rating was 34.3%.

== Presenters ==
Main host

- Keizō Takahashi

Progress announcers

- Kentaro Watanabe (TBS announcer)
- Yoshiko Nakada

== Nominees and winners ==
=== Japan Record Award ===
- "Ame no Bojō"
  - Artist: Aki Yashiro
  - Lyricist: Yū Aku
  - Composer: Keisuke Hama
  - Arranger: Koji Ryuzaki

=== Best Vocal Performance Award ===
- Harumi Miyako – "Ōsaka Shigure"

=== Best New Artist Award ===
- Toshihiko Tahara – "Hattoshite! Good"

=== New Artist Award ===
Best New Artist Award nominations.

- Yoshimi Iwasaki – "Anata Iro no Manon"
- Naoko Kawai – "Young Boy"
- Toshihiko Tahara – "Hattoshite! Good"
- Seiko Matsuda – "Aoi Sangoshou"
- Kazuko Matsumura – "Kaettekoi yo"

=== Special General Public Award ===
- Momoe Yamaguchi

=== Best Song Award ===
Japan Record Award nominations.

- Aki Yashiro – "Ame no Bojō"
- Sachiko Kobayashi – "Are kara Ichinen Tachimashita"
- Harumi Miyako – "Ōsaka Shigure"
- Hiromi Iwasaki – "Ginga Densetsu"
- Mayumi Itsuwa – "Koibito yo"
- Kenji Sawada – "Sakaba de Dabada"
- Hideki Saijo – "Santa Maria no Inori"
- Monta & Brothers – "Dancing All Night"
- Hiroshi Itsuki – "Futari no Yoake"
- Mizue Takada – "Watashi wa Piano"

=== Best Album Award ===
- Tsuyoshi Nagabuchi – Gyakuryū
- Yellow Magic Orchestra – Solid State Survivor
- Tatsuro Yamashita – Moonglow

=== Lyricist Award ===
Also known as the Yaso Saijō Award.

- Tetsuya Takeda – "Okuru Kotoba" (singer: Kaientai)

=== Composer Award ===
Also known as the Shinpei Nakayama Award.

- Yoshinori Monta – "Dancing All Night" (singer: Monta & Brothers)

=== Arranger Award ===
- Tsugutoshi Gotō – "TOKIO" (singer: Kenji Sawada)

=== Special Award ===
- Ichimaru
- Takao Saeki
- Ichirō Fujiyama

=== Planning Award ===
- Nippon Columbia
- King Records
- EMI Music Japan

=== Long Seller Award ===
- Los Indios & Silvia – "Wakaretemo Suki na Hito"

=== Achievement Award ===
Awarded by the Japan Composer's Association

- Player Award
  - Tasuku Sano (saxophonist and clarinetist)
  - Kazuo Tanaka (drummer)
  - Raymond Conde (clarinetist)
  - Kiichi Tazawa (pianist)
- Achievement Award
  - Sō Nishizawa (lyricist)

=== TBS Award ===
Awarded by the sponsoring organization.

- Kaientai

== Nominations ==
=== Best 10 JRA Nominations ===
Song	Singer	Votes (1st Round)	Votes (Final Round)
Ame no Bojō	Aki Yashiro	28	36
Futari no Yoake	Hiroshi Itsuki	21	23
Koibito yo	Mayumi Itsuwa	6	0
Dancing All Night	Monta & Brothers	3	0
Ōsaka Shigure	Harumi Miyako	1	0
Are kara Ichinen Tachimashita	Sachiko Kobayashi	0	0
Ginga Densetsu	Hiromi Iwasaki	0	0
Sakaba de Dabada	Kenji Sawada	0	0
Watashi wa Piano	Mizue Takada	0	0
Santa Maria no Inori	Hideki Saijo	0	0

=== Best Vocalist Nominations ===
Singer	Song
Michiyo Azusa	Shōshin Mono
Mayumi Itsuwa	Koibito yo
Hiromi Iwasaki	Ginga Densetsu
Saburō Kitajima	Fuusetsunagare Tabi
Hideki Saijo	Santa Maria no Inori
Mizue Takada	Watashi wa Piano
Goro Noguchi	Shurai
Jun Mayuzumi	Otoko wa Minna Hana ni nare
Akemi Misawa	Koishikute
Harumi Miyako	Ōsaka Shigure
Monta & Brothers	Dancing All Night
Junko Yagami	Purple Town 〜You Oughta Know By Now〜

== See also ==
- 1980 in Japanese music
