= Nocturne (Yasōkyoku) =

Studio album by Wink
- Released: November 26, 1992
- Recorded: 1992
- Genre: J-pop; dance-pop
- Language: Japanese
- Label: Polystar
- Producer: Haruo Mizuhashi

Wink chronology
Each Side of Screen (1992)	Nocturne (Yasōkyoku) (1992)	Raisonné (1992)

Singles from Nocturne (Yasōkyoku)
- 1. "Furimukanaide" Released: July 22, 1992; 2. "Real na Yume no Jōken" Released: October 21, 1992

Nocturne (Yasōkyoku) (Nocturne 〜夜想曲〜) is the ninth studio album by Japanese idol duo Wink, released by Polystar on November 26, 1992. It features the singles "Furimukanaide" (a cover of The Peanuts' song) and "Real na Yume no Jōken". Also included in the album are Japanese-language covers of Vanessa Williams' "Save the Best for Last", Pat Benatar's Invincible, and Mr. Zivago's "Little Russian".

The album peaked at No. 19 on Oricon's albums chart and sold over 26,000 copies.

== Track listing ==
All lyrics are written by Neko Oikawa, except where indicated; all music is arranged by Satoshi Kadokura, except where indicated.

No.	Title	Lyrics	Music	Arrangement	Length
1.	"Real na Yume no Jōken" (Riaru na Yume no Jōken (リアルな夢の条件; "Real Dream Conditions"))		Osny S. Melo		4:37
2.	"Anata ni Himitsu na Yoru" ((あなたに秘密な夜; "A Secret Night for You"))		Masahiro Takatsuki	Ryō Yonemitsu	3:37
3.	"Fuyu Gensō" ((冬幻想; "Winter Illusion"))		Takashi Kudō		4:58
4.	"Celebration"	Rui Serizawa	Phil Galdston; Wendy Waldman; Jon Lind		3:54
5.	"Setsuna Version" (Setsuna Vājon (刹那ヴァージョン; "Momentary Version"))		Milk Rie	Yonemitsu	4:42
6.	"Only One"		Yuki Kadokura		5:03
7.	"Mujitsu no Object" (Mujitsu no Obuje (無実のオブジェ; "An Innocent Object"))		Simon Climie; Holly Knight	Takao Sugiyama	4:31
8.	"Romance no Hakobune (Note: Cover of Mr. Zivago's "Little Russian".)" (Romansu no Hakobune (ロマンスの方舟; "Romance's Ark"))		Setolosi Alessandro Degl'innocenti; Marco Masini	Motoki Funayama	3:53
9.	"Furimukanaide" ((ふりむかないで; "Don't Look Back"))	Tokiko Iwatani	Hiroshi Miyagawa		4:07
10.	"Tokei wo Tomete" ((時計をとめて; "Stop the Clock"))	Ken Horishita	Horishita		4:43

== Charts ==
Chart (1992)	Peak position
Japanese Albums (Oricon)	19
