= Crystal King =

Crystal King may refer to:

- Crystal King (band), Japanese rock band
- Crystal King (Ninjago), fictional character in Ninjago
- A fictional character in Paper Mario
