= Aiso =

Aiso (written: 相曽 or 相磯) is a Japanese surname. Notable people with the surname include:

- Haruhi Aiso (相曽 晴日, born 1964), Japanese musician
- John F. Aiso (1909–1987), American lawyer and judge
