= Mayuzumi =

Mayuzumi (written: 黛) is a Japanese surname. Notable people with the surname include:

- Jun Mayuzumi (黛 ジュン, born 1948), Japanese singer
- Toshiro Mayuzumi (黛 敏郎, 1929–1997), Japanese composer

== Fictional characters ==
- Yukie Mayuzumi (黛 由紀江), a character in the visual novel Maji de Watashi ni Koi Shinasai!
