= Japan Lyricist Awards =

Awards ceremony in Japan

- Awarded for: Awarded to lyricists (mainly enka, kayokyoku)
- Sponsored by: Japan Lyricists' Association
- Location: TV Tokyo, First Studio
- Country: Japan
- First award: 1968; 58 years ago
- Website: www.jla-official.com/n_taisho.html

Japan Lyricist Awards (日本作詩大賞, Nihon Sakushi Taishō; lit. "Japan Versification Grand Prix") is an annual set of awards sponsored by the Japan Lyricists' Association. Awarded since 1968. Over the years the award ceremony has been produced by NHK and NTV and now, since the 27th Awards, by TV Tokyo.

== Grand Prix winning songs ==
This is a list of songs that have won the Grand Prix. For details on awards in other categories, visit the official website of the Japan Lyricists' Association. The audience share data are from Video Research, for Kanto area.

No.	Date	Song title	Lyricist	Singer	Broadcasting station	TV rating	Notes
1	June 27, 1968	"Itsudemo Kimi wa" (いつでも君は)	Tetsurō Hoshino (星野哲郎)	Kiyoko Suizenji	no broadcast		
2	May 22, 1969	"Hana to Chō" (花と蝶)	Kōhan Kawauchi	Shinichi Mori	no broadcast		
3	October 15, 1970	"Koi Hitosuji" (恋ひとすじ)	Masato Fujita	Shinichi Mori	no broadcast		
4	October 23, 1971	"Onna no Asa" (おんなの朝)	Sō Nishizawa (西沢 爽)	Kenichi Mikawa	no broadcast		
5	November 11, 1972	"Shūchakueki" (終着駅)	Kazuya Senke (千家和也)	Chiyo Okumura	no broadcast		
6	October 11, 1973	"Onna no Kaikyō" (おんなの海峡)	Miyuki Ishimoto (石本美由起)	Harumi Miyako	no broadcast		
7	December 7, 1974	"Saraba Tomo yo" (さらば友よ)	Yū Aku	Shinichi Mori	no broadcast		
8	December 8, 1975	"Shikuramen no Kahori" (シクラメンのかほり)	Kei Ogura	Akira Fuse	no broadcast		
9	December 4, 1976	"Kita no Yadokara" (北の宿から)	Yū Aku	Harumi Miyako	no broadcast		
10	December 2, 1977	"Katte ni Shiyagare" (勝手にしやがれ)	Yū Aku	Kenji Sawada	no broadcast		First successive Grand Prix win
11	November 30, 1978	"Aobajō Koi Uta" (青葉城恋唄)	Funaichi Hoshima (星間船一)	Muneyuki Satō (さとう宗幸)	NHK General TV		
12	November 15, 1979	"Miserarete" (魅せられて)	Yoko Aki	Judy Ongg	NHK General TV		
13	October 28, 1980	"Ōsaka Shigure" (大阪しぐれ)	Osamu Yoshioka	Harumi Miyako	NHK General TV		
14	October 27, 1981	"Moshimo Piano ga Hiketanara" (もしもピアノが弾けたなら)	Yū Aku	Toshiyuki Nishida	NHK General TV		
15	October 19, 1982	"Chigiri" (契り)	Yū Aku	Hiroshi Itsuki	NHK General TV	23.4%	Yū Aku registers second successive win
16	October 18, 1983	"Fuyu no Riviera" (冬のリヴィエラ)	Takashi Matsumoto	Shinichi Mori	NHK General TV	20.8%	
17	October 23, 1984	"Kita no Hotaru" (北の螢)	Yū Aku	Shinichi Mori	NHK General TV		
18	October 22, 1985	"Bōkyō jon kara" (望郷じょんから)	Ryūichi Satomura (里村龍一)	Takashi Hosokawa	NHK General TV	19.1%	
19	October 14, 1986	"Yūsuge no Koi" (ゆうすげの恋)	Daizaburō Nakayama (中山大三郎)	Shinichi Mori	NHK General TV	19.3%	
20	October 13, 1987	"Jinsei Iroiro" (人生いろいろ)	Daizaburō Nakayama (中山大三郎)	Chiyoko Shimakura	NHK General TV	20.3%	Second person to achieve a successive win
21	October 18, 1988	"Minato no Goban-chō" (港の五番町)	Yū Aku	Hiroshi Itsuki	NHK General TV	17.2%	
22	October 17, 1989	"Kaze no Bon Koi Uta" (風の盆恋歌)	Rei Nakanishi	Sayuri Ishikawa	NHK General TV		
23	October 14, 1990	"Utakata" (うたかた)	Osamu Yoshioka	Sayuri Ishikawa	NTV		
24	November 17, 1991	"Kita no Daichi" (北の大地)	Tetsurō Hoshino (星野哲郎)	Saburō Kitajima	NTV		
25	November 15, 1992	"Sakaba Hitori" (酒場ひとり)	Miyuki Ishimoto (石本美由起)	Mitsuko Nakamura (中村美律子)	NTV		
26	November 14, 1993	"Murasaki Ujō" (むらさき雨情)	Yasuteru Miura (三浦康照)	Ayako Fuji	NTV		
27	November 27, 1994	"Tsuki" (蒼月)	Koyomi Asa (麻こよみ)	Yōko Nagayama	TV Tokyo		
28	November 26, 1995	"Momo to Ringo no Monogatari" (桃と林檎の物語)	Mutsuki Ichikawa (市川睦月)	Junko Miyama (美山純子)	TV Tokyo		
29	November 24, 1996	"Chindō Monogatari" (珍島物語)	Daizaburō Nakayama (中山大三郎)	Yoshimi Tendo	TV Tokyo	9.7%	
30	November 23, 1997	"Ningyō (Omocha)" (人形（おもちゃ）)	Toyohisa Araki (荒木とよひさ)	Kaori Kozai	TV Tokyo	10.7%	
31	November 29, 1998	"Amerika Hashi" (アメリカ橋)	Yoko Yamaguchi	Yutaka Yamakawa (山川豊)	TV Tokyo	10.8%	
32	November 28, 1999	"Tabiji no Hana" (旅路の花)	Mitsuo Ikeda (池田充男)	Hiroko Hattori (服部浩子)	TV Tokyo		
33	November 26, 2000	"Hakone Hachiri no Hanjirō" (箱根八里の半次郎)	Yurio Matsui (松井由利夫)	Kiyoshi Hikawa	TV Tokyo		First ever Grand Prix for a debut song
34	November 26, 2001	"Rinto Shite" (凛として)	Taka Takashi (たかたかし)	Fuyumi Sakamoto	TV Tokyo	10.2%	
35	November 24, 2002	"Kasannaka" (傘ん中)	Yū Aku	Hiroshi Itsuki	TV Tokyo	8.2%	
36	November 28, 2003	"Onna no Isshō (Ase no Hana)" (おんなの一生〜汗の花〜)	Osamu Yoshioka	Miyuki Kawanaka	TV Tokyo	10.7%	
37	November 28, 2004	"Kushiro Shitsugen" (釧路湿原)	Ryūtarō Kinoshita (木下龍太郎)	Kaori Mizumori	TV Tokyo	12.1%	
38	November 27, 2005	"Taiki Bansei" (大器晩成)	Tetsurō Hoshino (星野哲郎)	Aya Shimazu (島津亜矢)	TV Tokyo	9.8%	
39	November 26, 2006	"Saihoku Kōro" (最北航路)	Mitsuo Ikeda (池田充男)	Kaori Kozai	TV Tokyo	7.4%	
40th	November 25, 2007	"Danjiri" (だんじり)	Yurio Matsui (松井由利夫)	Mitsuko Nakamura (中村美律子)	TV Tokyo	9.5%	
41	November 30, 2008	"Umiyuki" (海雪)	Yasushi Akimoto	Jero	TV Tokyo	10.0%	Second time a debut song wins the Grand Prix
42	November 29, 2009	"Tokimeki no Rumba" (ときめきのルンバ)	Reiji Mizuki (水木れいじ)	Kiyoshi Hikawa	TV Tokyo	5.1%	
43	November 28, 2010	"Jinsei Michizure" (人生みちづれ)	Reiji Mizuki (水木れいじ)	Yoshimi Tendo	TV Tokyo	7.8%	Third person to achieve a successful Grand Prix win
44	November 27, 2011	"Ikutabi no Sakura" (いくたびの櫻)	Michio Yamagami (山上路夫)	Mai Fukui	TV Tokyo	6.9%	
45	December 6, 2012	"Sakura" (櫻)	Rei Nakanishi	Kiyoshi Hikawa	TV Tokyo	11.1%	
46	December 5, 2013	"Hakata a la Mode" (博多ア・ラ・モード)	Raymond Matsuya (レーモンド松屋)	Hiroshi Itsuki	TV Tokyo	7.7%	Special TV Tokyo Award goes to Yoshio Tabata
47	December 4, 2014	"Choi to Kimagure Wataridori" (ちょいときまぐれ渡り鳥)	Toshiya Nishitani (仁井谷俊也)	Kiyoshi Hikawa	TV Tokyo	6.3%	
48	December 3, 2015	"Koma" (独楽)	Kyōsuke Kuni (久仁京介)	Aya Shimazu (島津亜矢)	TV Tokyo	8.1%	
49	December 1, 2016	"Utsusemi no Ie" (空蝉の家)	Mami Takubo (田久保真見)	Takao Horiuchi	TV Tokyo	4.5%	
50	December 3, 2017	"Hijikawa Arashi" (肱川あらし)	Makoto Kitajō (喜多條忠)	Natsuko Godai (伍代夏子)	TV Tokyo	5.7%	
51	December 8, 2018	"Tenryū Nagashi" (天竜流し)	Takashi Manjō (万城たかし)	Kōhei Fukuda (福田こうへい)	BS TV Tokyo		
