= Japan Lyricists Association =

The Japan Lyricists Association (日本作詩家協会; Nihon Sakushi Kakyōkai) abbr. as JLA is an organization of Japanese lyricists, established in June 1965. Since 1968 it holds the annual Japan Lyricist Awards.

== Presidents ==
- Hachirō Satō (1967–1975)
- Kō Fujiura (1975–1984)
- Sō Nishizawa (1984–1988)
- Miyuki Ishimoto (1988–1996)
- Tetsurō Hoshino (1996–2008)
- Reiko Yukawa (2008–2012)
- Ryūichi Satomura (2012–)

Between 1965 and 1967, Tetsurō Fujima was the organization's representative.

=== Selected list of vice presidents ===
- Osamu Yoshioka

== See also ==
- Japan Lyricist Award
- Japan Composer's Association
