= Koi no Kisetsu =

1968 debut single by Pinky & Killers

Single by Pinky & Killers

from the album Pinkira Double Deluxe
- Language: Japanese
- English title: The Season of Love
- B-side: "Tsumetai Ame"
- Released: July 20, 1968
- Recorded: 1968
- Genre: Kayōkyoku
- Length: 3:23
- Label: King Records
- Composer: Taku Izumi
- Lyricist: Tokiko Iwatani

Pinky & Killers singles chronology
"Koi no Kisetsu" (1968)	"Ore to Kanojo" (1968)

Audio video
- "Koi no Kisetsu" on YouTube

"Koi no Kisetsu" (恋の季節; lit. "The Season of Love") is the debut single by the Japanese band Pinky & Killers. Written by Tokiko Iwatani and Taku Izumi, the single was released through King Records on July 20, 1968. A musical film based on the song was released by Shochiku in 1969.

== Background ==
"Koi no Kisetsu" earned Pinky & Killers the New Artist Award at the 10th Japan Record Awards in December 1968. The band also performed the song on the 19th Kōhaku Uta Gassen that year, making them the first mixed group to perform on NHK's New Year's Eve special. After much deliberation, the show's producers assigned the band to the female-oriented Red team, as vocalist Yōko Kon ("Pinky") was the band leader.

The song was featured in the soundtrack of the 2009 anime film Evangelion: 2.0 You Can (Not) Advance.

== Commercial performance ==
The single stayed at No. 1 on Oricon's weekly singles chart for 17 combined weeks from September 23, 1968 to January 20, 1969 and landed at No. 3 on Oricon's 1968 year-ending chart and at No. 4 on Oricon's 1969 year-ending chart, selling over 2.7 million copies. The song was ranked at No. 18 on Oricon's historical singles chart.

== Track listing ==
All lyrics are written by Tokiko Iwatani; all music is composed and arranged by Taku Izumi.

7-inch vinyl
No.	Title	Length
1.	"Koi no Kisetsu" ((恋の季節; "The Season of Love"))	3:23
2.	"Tsumetai Ame" ((つめたい雨; "Heavy Rain"))	2:56
Total length:		6:19

== Personnel ==
- Yōko Kon – lead vocals
- George Hamano – backing vocals
- Louis Takano – guitar
- Endy Yamaguchi – bass
- Pancho Kagami – drums

== Charts ==
=== Weekly charts ===
Chart (1968)	Peak position
Japan (Oricon)	1

=== Year-end charts ===
Chart (1968)	Peak position
Japan (Oricon)	3

Chart (1969)	Peak position
Japan (Oricon)	4

== Cover versions ==
- Sachiko Nishida covered the song on her 2007 CD box set Nishida Sachiko Kayōdaizenshū.
- GO!GO!7188 covered the song on their 2008 cover album Tora no Ana 2.
- Akina Nakamori covered the song on her 2009 cover album Mood Kayō: Utahime Shōwa Meikyoku Shū.
- Naomi Sagara covered the song on her 2010 compilation Golden Best: Naomi Sagara Complete Singles + Hit Cover Collection.
- Kiyomi Suzuki covered the song on her 2011 cover album Woman Sings the Blues.
- Hideaki Tokunaga covered the song on his 2012 cover album Vocalist Vintage.
- Yutaka Mizutani covered the song on his 2015 cover album Toki no Tabibito 2015.
- Begin covered the song on their 2017 album Begin no Marcha Chora 2.

== Film ==
A Japanese musical film of the same name, based on the song, was released by Shochiku on February 21, 1969.

The film was an overseas box office hit in the Soviet Union when it released there in 1970, selling a total of 27.6 million tickets.

== See also ==
- 1968 in Japanese music
