= 2nd Japan Record Awards =

1960 Japanese music awards ceremony

- Date: 30 December 1960
- Venue: Kyouritsu Jyoshigakuen Hall

The 2nd Japan Record Awards were held on 30 December 1960. They recognized musical accomplishments by performers for the year 1960. Kazuko Matsuo, Hiroshi Wada & Mahina Stars won the Japan Record Award, being the first duet that achieve the award. This is also the first time that the new artist award was given.

== Emcee ==
Takayuki Akutagawa

== Award winners ==
Japan Record Award

- Kazuko Matsuo, Hiroshi Wada & Mahina Stars for "Dare Yorimo Kimi Wo Aisu"
  - Lyricist: Kōhan Kawauchi
  - Composer: Tadashi Yoshida
  - Arranger: Hiroshi Wada
  - Record Company: JVC Victor

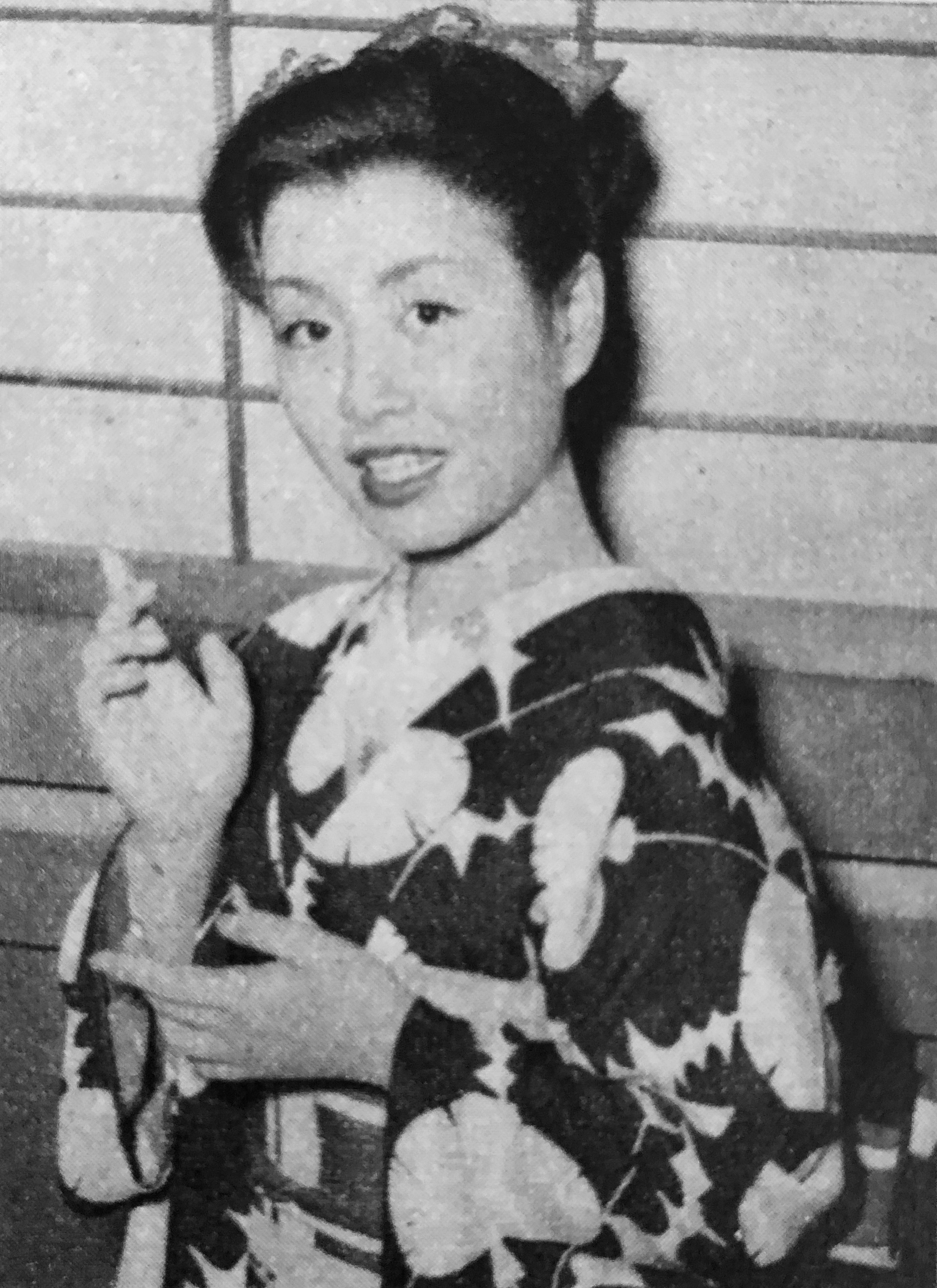
Hibari Misora, Vocalist Award awarder.

Vocalist Award

- Hibari Misora for "Aishuu Hatoba"

New Artist Award

- Yukio Hashi for "Itakogasa"

Composer Award

- Koga Masao for "Shiroi Koyubi No Uta"
  - Singer: Chiyoko Shimakura

Planning Award

- Nippon Columbia for "Zundoko Bushi" & "Danchone Bushi"
  - Singer: Akira Kobayashi

Children's Song Award

- Minakami Fusako & Kingu Kobatokai for "Yuuran Bus"

== See also ==
- 1960 in Japanese music
