= Tora-san's Song of Love =

- Theatrical poster
- Directed by: Yoji Yamada
- Written by: Yoji Yamada; Yoshitaka Asama
- Starring: Kiyoshi Atsumi; Harumi Miyako
- Cinematography: Tetsuo Takaba
- Edited by: Iwao Ishii
- Music by: Naozumi Yamamoto
- Distributed by: Shochiku
- Release date: August 6, 1983
- Running time: 101 minutes
- Country: Japan
- Language: Japanese

Tora-san's Song of Love (男はつらいよ 旅と女と寅次郎, Otoko wa Tsurai yo: Tabi to Onna to Torajirō) aka Torasan's Journey with a Lady is a 1983 Japanese comedy film directed by Yoji Yamada. It stars Kiyoshi Atsumi as Torajirō Kuruma (Tora-san), and Harumi Miyako as his love interest or "Madonna". Tora-san's Song of Love is the thirty-first entry in the popular, long-running Otoko wa Tsurai yo series.

== Synopsis ==
Tora-san returns to his family home to learn that his brother-in-law cannot go to Mitsuo's (Tora-san's nephew) athletic event. Tora-san volunteers to take his place, but gets into an argument with his brother-in-law's boss and returns to the road. He meets a young woman in Niigata who, unbeknownst to him, is a popular enka singer.

== Cast ==
- Kiyoshi Atsumi as Torajirō
- Chieko Baisho as Sakura
- Harumi Miyako as Harumi Kyo
- Shimojo Masami as Kuruma Tatsuzō
- Chieko Misaki as Tsune Kuruma (Torajiro's aunt)
- Gin Maeda as Hiroshi Suwa
- Hisao Dazai as Boss (Umetarō Katsura)
- Gajirō Satō as Genkō
- Hidetaka Yoshioka as Mitsuo Suwa
- Chishū Ryū as Gozen-sama
- Takuya Fujioka as Kitamura
- Senri Sakurai as Mita
- Bengal as Yoshioka
- Noko Konoha as Tomiko
- Chieko Nakakita as Hisako Shōji

== Critical appraisal ==
Stuart Galbraith IV considers Tora-san's Song of Love to be a minor entry in the Otoko wa Tsurai yo series. The German-language site molodezhnaja gives Tora-san's Song of Love three and a half out of five stars.

== Availability ==
Tora-san's Song of Love was released theatrically on August 6, 1983. In Japan, the film was released on videotape in 1996, and in DVD format in 2002 and 2008.

== Bibliography ==
=== English ===
- "OTOKO WA TSURAI YO KUCHIBUE O FUKU TORAJIRO (1983)". British Film Institute. Archived from the original on 2012-10-17.
- "OTOKO WA TSURAIYO -TABI TO ONNA TO TORAJIRO". Complete Index to World Film.
- Otoko wa tsurai yo: Tabi to onna to Torajirô (1983) at IMDb
- Galbraith IV, Stuart (2007-01-24). "Tora-san 31: Tora-san's Song of Love (Region 3)". DVD Talk.

=== German ===
- "Tora-San's Song of Love" (in German). www.molodezhnaja.ch.

=== Japanese ===
- 男はつらいよ 旅と女と寅次郎 (1983) (in Japanese). allcinema.net.
- "男はつらいよ 旅と女と寅次郎". Japanese Cinema Database (Agency for Cultural Affairs). Archived from the original on 2014-03-18.
- 男はつらいよ 旅と女と寅次郎 (in Japanese). Japanese Movie Database.
- 男はつらいよ 旅と女と寅次郎 (in Japanese). Kinema Junpo. Archived from the original on 2012-03-09.
