= Furimukanaide =

1962 single by The Peanuts

Single by The Peanuts
- Language: Japanese
- English title: Don't Look Back
- B-side: "Atene no Koiuta"
- Released: February 10, 1962
- Recorded: 1961
- Genre: Kayōkyoku
- Label: King Records
- Composer: Hiroshi Miyagawa
- Lyricist: Tokiko Iwatani

The Peanuts singles chronology
"Itsumo Kokoro ni Taiyō wo" (1962)	"Furimukanaide" (1962)	"Kimi Sarishi Yoru" (1962)

"Furimukanaide" (ふりむかないで; lit. "Don't Look Back") is a single by Japanese music duo The Peanuts. Composed by Hiroshi Miyagawa with lyrics by Tokiko Iwatani, the single was released on February 10, 1962, by King Records. The song was written in the style of American pop music at the time. It stood out in the Japanese music scene, as it was an original composition in contrast to the "cover pops" that were translations of western pop songs. In addition, it was one of the earliest Japanese songs recorded in stereo. The Peanuts performed the song on the 13th Kōhaku Uta Gassen.

"Furimukanaide" was featured in the film Watashi to Watashi (私と私; Me and Myself), which also starred the Peanuts. It was also used in the 2009 anime film Evangelion: 2.0 You Can (Not) Advance, as well as the 2015 Fuji TV drama series Date: Koi to wa Donna Mono Kashira (デート〜恋とはどんなものかしら〜; Dating: I Wonder What Love Is Like).

== Track listing ==
All lyrics are written by Tokiko Iwatani.

No.	Title	Music	Length
1.	"Furimukunaide" ((ふりむかないで; "Don't Look Back"))	Hiroshi Miyagawa
2.	"Atene no Koiuta" ((アテネの恋唄; "Athens Love Song"))	Manos Hatzidakis

== Wink version ==
"Furimukanaide"

Single by Wink

from the album Nocturne (Yasōkyoku)
- Language: Japanese
- English title: Don't Look Back
- B-side: "Romance no Hakobune"
- Released: July 22, 1992
- Recorded: 1992
- Genre: J-pop; dance-pop
- Length: 4:07
- Label: Polystar
- Composer: Hiroshi Miyagawa
- Lyricist: Tokiko Iwatani
- Producer: Haruo Mizuhashi

Wink singles chronology
"Matenrō Museum" (1992)	"Furimukanaide" (1992)	"Real na Yume no Jōken" (1992)

Music video
- "Furimukanaide" on YouTube

"Furimukanaide" was covered by the idol duo Wink as their 15th single, released on July 22, 1992, by Polystar Records. This version was used as the ending theme of the Fuji TV quiz show Naruhodo! The World. The B-side, "Romance no Hakobune", is a Japanese-language cover of Italian singer Mr. Zivago's "Little Russian".

This version peaked at No. 7 on the Oricon's weekly charts and sold over 132,000 copies.

=== Track listing ===
No.	Title	Lyrics	Music	Arrangement	Length
1.	"Furimukunaide" ((ふりむかないで; "Don't Look Back"))	Tokiko Iwatani	Hiroshi Miyagawa	Satoshi Kadokura	4:07
2.	"Romance no Hakobune" (Romansu no Hakobune (ロマンスの方舟; "Romance's Ark"))	Neko Oikawa	Setolosi Alessandro Degl'innocenti; Marco Masini	Motoki Funayama	3:54

=== Charts ===
Weekly charts

Chart (1992)	Peak position
Japanese Oricon Singles Chart	7

Year-end charts

Chart (1992)	Peak position
Japanese Oricon Singles Chart	141

== Other cover versions ==
- Candies covered the song on their 1977 album Candy Label.
- Juicy Fruits covered the song on their 1981 album Pajama Date.
- Harumi Inoue covered the song in 1991.
- The Nolans covered the song in English as "Please Don't" on their 1992 cover album Please Don't.
- Yasuko Matsuyuki covered the song in 1997.
- W covered the song as the B-side of their 2003 single "Koi no Fuga".
- Russian duo Arahis covered the song in 2006.
- The Lilies covered the song on their 2014 cover album The Lilies Sing the Peanuts.
- Sasa Handa covered the song on her 2015 album Double S.
- Manaka and Asahi of Little Glee Monster covered the song on the 2016 various artists album The Peanuts Tribute Songs.

== See also ==
- 1962 in Japanese music
