= Crystal King (band) =

Japanese pop rock and kayōkyoku band

- Origin: Japan
- Genres: Pop rock, kayōkyoku
- Years active: 1971–1998-present
- Labels: Pony Canyon
- Members: Monsieur Yoshisaki
- Past members: Masayuki Tanaka; Michio Yamashita; Kimiharu Nakamura; Hiromi Imakiire; Ken Kanefuku; Hidetoshi Nomoto; Others

Crystal King (クリスタルキング, Kurisutaru Kingu) is a Japanese pop rock and kayōkyoku band.

== History ==
Crystal King originally consisted of vocalists Monsieur Yoshisaki (ムッシュ吉崎, Musshu Yoshisaki) and Masayuki Tanaka, guitarist Michio Yamashita (山下 三智夫, Yamashita Michio), pianist Kimiharu Namakura (中村 公晴, Nakamura Kimiharu), keyboardist Hiromi Imakiire (今給黎 博美, Imakiire Hiromi), drummer Ken Kanefuku (金福 健, Kanefuku Ken), and bassist Hidetoshi Nomoto (野元 英俊, Nomoto Hidetoshi). The band saw its first commercial success at the end of 1979 with debut single "Daitokai", which sold 1.5 million copies, winning two popular song festivals, (18th Yamaha Popular Song Contest and 10th World Popular Song Festival in Tokyo). Other successful singles included "Shinkirō" in 1980 (750,000 copies sold), "Shojo Kōkai" (1980), "Passion-Lady" (1981), "Ceccile" (1982) and "Setouchi kōshinkyoku (IN THE MOOD)" (1984).

Internationally, the band are best known for writing and performing the first two songs of the anime Fist of the North Star, "Ai o Torimodose!!" and "Yuria ... Eien ni". The original single of 1984 sold more than 500,000 copies, rising to over 1 million copies including later versions and re-releases.

In 1986, Tanaka left Crystal King to launch a solo career. However, in June 1989 he lost his voice after being struck in the throat by a baseball, and never regained his original three-octave vocal range. The rest of the band performs as Cross Road (クロスロード, Kurosu Rōdo), reuniting with Tanaka on occasion.

The band broke up in 1995, and vocalist Yoshisaki continued performing as Crystal King as a solo project.

== Albums ==
- 5 May 1980 - Crystal King
- 21 December 1980 - Locus
- 21 September 1981 - Eleven Carats
- 21 April 1983 - City Adventure
- 21 June 1985 - Moon
- 25 July 1987 - 1968・夏・東京
- 6 June 1996 - Bear Away
