= Real na Yume no Jōken =

Single by Wink

from the album Nocturne (Yasōkyoku)
- Language: Japanese
- English title: Real Dream Conditions
- B-side: "Mujitsu no Object"
- Released: October 21, 1992
- Recorded: 1992
- Genre: J-pop; dance-pop
- Length: 4:39
- Label: Polystar
- Composer: Osny S. Melo
- Lyricist: Neko Oikawa
- Producer: Haruo Mizuhashi

Wink singles chronology
"Furimukanaide" (1992)	"Real na Yume no Jōken" (1992)	"Eien no Ladydoll (Voyage, voyage)" (1993)

Music video
- "Real na Yume no Jōken" on YouTube

"Real na Yume no Jōken" (リアルな夢の条件, Riaru na Yume no Jōken; lit. "Real Dream Conditions") is the 16th single by Japanese idol duo Wink. Written by Neko Oikawa and Osny S. Melo, the single was released on October 21, 1992, by Polystar Records.

== Background and release ==
The B-side, "Mujitsu no Object" is a Japanese-language cover of Pat Benatar's "Invincible".

"Real na Yume no Jōken" peaked at No. 10 on the Oricon's weekly charts and sold over 90,000 copies.

== Track listing ==
All lyrics are written by Neko Oikawa.

No.	Title	Music	Arrangement	Length
1.	"Real na Yume no Jōken" (Riaru na Yume no Jōken (摩リアルな夢の条件; "Real Dream Conditions"))	Osny S. Melo	Satoshi Kadokura	4:39
2.	"Mujitsu no Object" (Mujitsu no Obuje (無実のオブジェ; "An Innocent Object"))	Simon Climie; Holly Knight	Takao Sugiyama	4:31

== Charts ==
Weekly charts

Chart (1992)	Peak position
Japanese Oricon Singles Chart	10

Year-end charts

Chart (1992)	Peak position
Japanese Oricon Singles Chart	203
