= Makkana Taiyō =

Japanese song written by Nobuo Hara

"Makkana Taiyō" (Japanese: 真赤な太陽) is a song performed by Hibari Misora and the Blue Comets, and released as a single in 1967. It reached number 1 on the Japanese singles chart according to Billboard, and sold 1.4 million copies. The song has been called "Red Hot Sun" in English. It was written by Nobuo Hara. It has been covered many times, by artists such as The Ventures, King Curtis, and the Tokyo Ska Paradise Orchestra. The song uses a pentatonic scale.

== See also ==
- 1967 in Japanese music
