= Tom Cat (band) =

Japanese band

Tom Cat (トム・キャット, Tomu Kyatto; TOM★CAT) were a 1980s Japanese band. They are best known for their song "TOUGH BOY", used as the opening theme for Fist of the North Star 2.

== Original members ==
- TOM: Vocals and keyboard
  - Real name: Atsumi Matsuzaki (松崎 淳美, MATSUZAKI Atsumi)
- Akio Hinago, Seiji Nagayoshi: Guitars
- Fusahiko Ishikawa, Tadashi Hori: Bass
- Kaoru Takagaki: Drums
- Keisuke Kikuchi, Tsuru Suzuki: Keyboards

=== Current members ===
- TOM: Vocals and keyboard
- Keiji Sasaki: Guitar
- Seiji Nagayoshi: Guitar
- Hiroaki Naruke: Bass
- Akira Ōtaka: Drums
- Tsuru Suzuki: Keyboards

== Discography ==
=== Singles ===
- "Furare Kibun Rock'n'Roll" - November 14, 1984
- "Summertime Graffiti" - April 5, 1985
- "Umare Tsuite no CRAZY" - August 21, 1985
- "Hitori Bocchino Hanrangun" - April 5, 1986
- "LADY BLUE" - October 1986
- "TOUGH BOY" c/w "LOVE SONG" - March 1987
  - Fist of the North Star 2 opening/ending theme single

=== Albums ===
- TOM★CAT - June 21, 1985
- FENCE - May 1986
- My Recommend: TOM☆CAT - December 21, 2006
