= Fubuki Koshiji =

Japanese singer and actress (1924-1980)

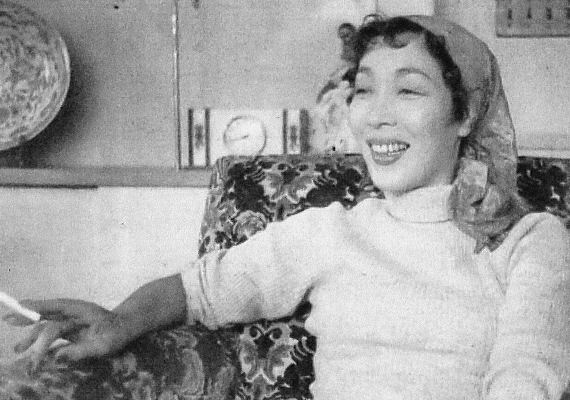
- Koshiji in 1954
- Born: Mihoko Kouno; February 18, 1924
- Died: November 7, 1980 (aged 56)
- Spouse: Tsunemi Naitō

Fubuki Koshiji (越路 吹雪; 18 February 1924 – 7 November 1980), real name Mihoko Kouno (内藤 美保子), was a Japanese singer and actress.

She joined the Takarazuka Revue in 1939. Though she was recognized as a star at Takarazuka, she left in 1951. When she chose to leave the troupe, Koshiji's friend, Tokiko Iwatani, also quit to manage Koshiji's budding career in film, made possible by the liberalization that took place during and after the occupation of Japan. Throughout the 1950s, Koshiji appeared in productions that merged the arts of shinpa, shingeki, and kabuki.

Known as the "Queen of Chanson" (シャンソンの女王, Shanson no Joō), Koshiji was influenced by French singer Édith Piaf. She released Japanese-language covers of Piaf's "Hymne à l'amour" in 1951, "Tombe la neige" by Salvatore Adamo, and "C'est si bon".

Koshiji was married to composer Tsunemi Naitō. She died in Tokyo of stomach cancer at the age of 56. Koshiji's final words, addressed to her husband, were "Tsunemi-san, black coffee and milk."

She is the subject of "Koshiji Fubuki Monogatari", a television production of TV Asahi in Japan with Takimoto Miori playing the role of Fubuki Koshiji.

== Selected filmography ==
- A Night Without Stars (1951)
- Wedding March (1951)
- Ah, Tears of Youth (1952)
- The Woman Who Touched Legs (1952)
- Gozen Reiji (1953)
- The Lover (1953)
- Mr. Pu (1953)
- With All My Heart (1953)
- Jirocho's New Year (1954)
- Last of the Wild One (1954)
- Love Express (1954)
- A Man Among Men (1955)
- That Crazy Adventure (1965)
