= Masao Sen =

Masao Sen 千昌夫
- Born: 8 April 1947
- Origin: Rikuzentakata, Iwate, Iwate Prefecture, Japan
- Genres: Enka
- Occupation: Singer
- Years active: 1965-

Masao Sen (千昌夫, Sen Masao, born 8 April 1947) is a Japanese Enka singer and businessman, of Iwate Prefecture, known for the song 'Kitaguni no Haru' ('North Country Spring'). He is affiliated with the talent agency NoReason Inc.

== Career ==
In 1977, he released his greatest hit, Kitaguni no haru ('North Country Spring'). It won the "Long Seller Award" at the 21st Japan Record Awards, sold 3 million copies, and was covered by notable artists such as Aki Yashiro, Teresa Teng, and Misora Hibari.

== Personal life ==
Masao is the second son in a rural agricultural household and deliberately stressed his poor country origins as part of his image.

He reportedly had a taste for blondes, and in 1972 married American jazz singer Joan Shepard.

During the Bubble era, he became extremely wealthy, owning a Rolls-Royce and living in a luxurious, 13-room home.
