= Haruhi Aiso =

Japanese popular music artist (born 1964)

Aiso Haruhi (相曽 晴日, Aiso Haruhi; born February 13, 1964 in Hamamatsu, Shizuoka Prefecture, Japan) is a female Japanese popular music artist. She has also written songs for Iwao Junko and Iwasaki Hiromi.

== Discography ==
=== Singles ===
- "Mai" (21 August 1982)
- "Kohihausu nite" (5 March 1983)
- "Suisaiga" (21 July 1983)
- "Ichigo no Kaze" (21 April 1984)
- "Otoko to Onna de" (5 March 1985)
- "Yume no mama no Yutopia" (5 June 1985) - A duet with Matsuzaki Makoto

=== Albums ===
- Towairaito no Kaze (LP:5 November 1982) (CD:21 April 1985) - Re-released by Yamaha Music Communications on December 12, 2001
- Kaze ha Kimagure (LP:21 August 1983) (CD:22 October 2003)
- Akai Pedhikyua (LP:5 June 1984) (CD:22 October 2003)
- Intrigue (LP:25 April 1985) (CD:5 November 1985) - Re-released by King Records on October 22, 2003
- High noon High moon (5 September 1987)
- TRICTRAC - Aiso Haruhi Best Selection (21 November 1987)
- Taiyō no Gochiso (21 April 1988)
- Uchu no Kioku (5 November 1988)
- Aiso Haruhi Collection (26 November 1999)
- Tsuki no Kodomo (24 December 2000)
- Shiawase ni Narou (25 December 2002)
- Aiso Haruhi Best (26 March 2003)
