= Jackey Yoshikawa and His Blue Comets =

Japanese musical group

Background information
- Origin: Japan
- Genre: GS
- Years active: 1957 – 2021

Jackey Yoshikawa and His Blue Comets ( Japanese: ジャッキー吉川とブルー・コメッツ) is a Japanese GS band, active from 1957.

== History of the band ==
The band formed in 1957 just as The Blue Comets. In 1963 they renamed "Jackie Yoshikawa and the Blue Comets" with Jackie Yoshikawa serving as the leader of the group. Their debut single "Aoi Hitomi" ("Blue Eyes") was an immediate success, selling over 100,000 copies in its English-language version and over 500,000 copies in its Japanese-language version. They appeared on The Ed Sullivan Show performing their major hit song of 1967 "Blue Chateau" (ブルー・シャトウ, "Burū shatō"), which won a Japan Record Award and sold over one million copies The song was covered by The Ventures later that year to include in their Pops in Japan album, gaining the song overseas recognition. Thanks to their popularity, they were the first musical group invited to participate in a Kōhaku Uta Gassen contest. Their last song to chart was "Ame no Hymn", which was released in January 1971 and reached the No. 65 on the Oricon Chart.

In October 1971 Tadao Inoue, Kenji Takahashi, and Tsunaki Mihara left the group, replaced by new members. Tadao Inoue committed suicide by hanging in May 2000. The surviving members of the original line-up reunited in October 2001. The leader of the band Jackey Yoshikawa died in May 2020.

The song "Makkana Taiyō" (1967) is by the Blue Comets and Hibari Misora.
