= Yumiko Kokonoe =

Japanese actress and singer

- 九重佑三子
- Born: 21 March 1946 (age 80); Tokyo, Japan
- Occupations: Singer; actress
- Spouse: Yasuo Tanabe (m. 1974)
- Musical career
- Years active: 1963–present

Yumiko Kokonoe (九重佑三子, born 21 March 1946) is a Japanese actress and singer. Her most notable role was the protagonist of the series Comet-san filmed by Tokyo Broadcasting Corporation (TBS). 79 episodes of Comet-san were produced during 1967 and 1968 by TBS.
