= The Folk Crusaders =

- Also known as: Fōkuru (フォークル)
- Origin: Kyoto, Japan
- Genres: Folk
- Years active: 1965–1967, 1967–1968; 2002 and 2013 (reunions)
- Labels: Toshiba
- Past members: Osamu Kitayama; Kazuhiko Katō (deceased); Yoshio Hiranuma; Masaki Ashida; Mikio Imura; Norihiko Hashida (deceased)

The Folk Crusaders (Japanese: ザ・フォーク・クルセダーズ, Hepburn: Za Fōku Kurusedāzu), also known as simply Fōkuru (フォークル), was a Japanese folk group, popular in Japan in the later half of the 1960s.

== Career ==
The band was formed in 1965 by the five university students Kazuhiko Katō, Osamu Kitayama, Yoshio Hiranuma, Mikio Imura and Masaki Ashida, but Ashida and Imura left the band at an early stage. The three-man band were active in the Kansai underground scene for some time, but in 1967 the band decided to split up, and to commemorate the split up they released the self-produced album Harenchi in only 300 copies. The same year, the album was picked up by radio stations in Kyoto and Kobe, where the songs "Imujingawa" and "Kaette Kita Yopparai" were played frequently. "Kaette Kita Yopparai" ("Drunkard Returns") sold over one and a quarter million copies, and was awarded a gold disc. The band starred in a 1968 movie with the same title as the song, Three Resurrected Drunkards, directed by Nagisa Oshima. The members continued their musical careers in different bands but had two reunions as The Folk Crusaders and released some more albums.

The band's song "Imujingawa", a song about the Imjin River and the splitting of Korea, played a role in the 2004 movie, Pacchigi!.

== Members ==
- Osamu Kitayama (きたやまおさむ) (1965–1967, 1967–1968, 2002, 2013): Also known as a psychoanalyst, who served as a professor of psychoanalysis and medicine at Kyushu University, a vice president of Hakuoh University, and the chairman of the Japan Psychoanalytical Association. He currently serves as a professor emeritus at Kyushu University.
- Kazuhiko Katō (加藤和彦) (1965–1967, 1967–1968, 2002, died 2009)
- Yoshio Hiranuma (平沼義男) (1965–1967)
- Mikio Imura (井村幹生) (1965)
- Masaki Ashida (芦田雅喜) (1965, 1966–1967)
- Norihiko Hashida (はしだのりひこ) (1967–1968, died 2017)
- Konosuke Sakazaki (坂崎幸之助) (2002, 2013)
