= Yukari Itō =

Yukari Itō 伊東ゆかり
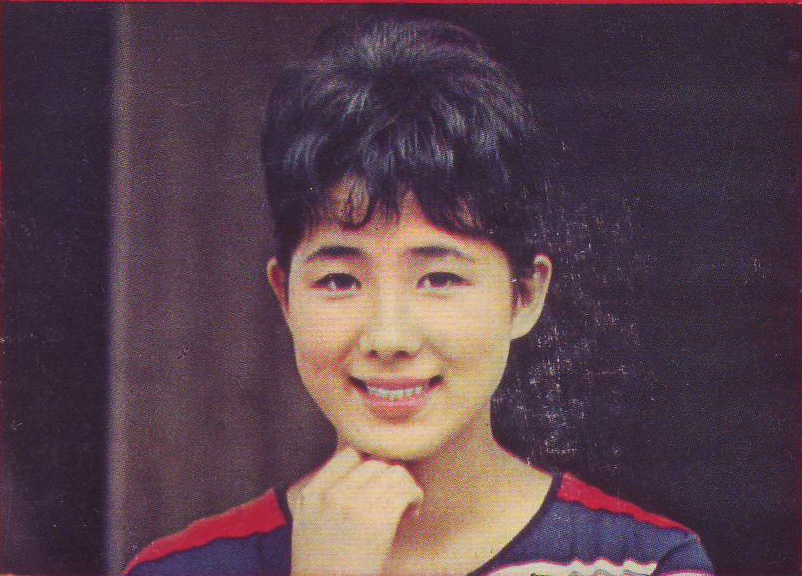
- Yukari Itō in 1963

Background information
- Born: 伊東 信子 (Nobuko Itō); April 6, 1947 (age 79); Shinagawa, Tokyo, Japan
- Genres: Japanese pop, Kayōkyoku, Chanson
- Occupations: Singer, actress
- Years active: 1958-present
- Label: King Records (Japan)
- Spouse: Mitsuo Sagawa (1971-1975)

Yukari Itō (Japanese: 伊東 ゆかり, born 6 April 1947) is a Japanese singer and actress.

She was born in Shinagawa, Tokyo, and her father was from Okinawa. She was one of the Japanese pop singers who took the nation by storm during the 1960s and 1970s. In addition to appearing on music programs and performing in concerts as a singer, she also worked as an actress.

== Career ==
=== Early career ===
Yukari Itō began singing at US military camps as a child. In June 1958, she made her official debut with King Records at the age of 11 with the single "かたみの十字架／クワイ河マーチ" (Japanese theme song from the movie The Bridge on the River Kwai).

=== Rise to fame (1960s) ===
After taking a temporary break from her entertainment career, she resumed her activities after transferring to Watanabe Publications. Together with Mie Nakao and Mari Sono, both known for their pop music performances, she became a member of the trio Spark Sannin Musume (スパーク3人娘) in 1962. They performed on television programs such as Shabondama Holiday (シャボン玉ホリデー, Nippon Television) and Utae! Ichioku (歌え!一億, Fuji Television), gaining nationwide recognition.

In 1965, Yukari Itō became the first Japanese artist to perform at the Sanremo Music Festival in Italy. She performed "L'amore ha i tuoi occhi" with Italian singer Bruno Filippini and the song reached the final of the competition. She also participated in the Mostra internazionale di musica leggera with the song "Poco dopo".

Her 1967 single "Koyubi no Omoide" (小指の想い出) became a major hit and has been well-known for many years. She then went on to release a string of hit singles in quick succession, including "Koi no Shizuku" (恋のしずく), "Hoshi o Minaide" (星を見ないで), "Asa no Kuchizuke" (朝のくちづけ), and "Shiranakatta no" (知らなかったの).

At that time, her relationship with Yomiuri Giants player Isao Shibata gathered considerable public attention. There were even rumors that the couple would marry.

In 1969, she starred in the film Aisuru Ashita (愛するあした) and served as the host for the 20th Kōhaku Uta Gassen, broadcast on NHK General TV and NHK Radio 1.

=== Later career (1970-) ===
In 1970, following the release of her single "Kekkon" (結婚, lit. 'marriage'), she left Watanabe Publications. Although her 1971 single "Dare mo Shiranai" (誰も知らない) was successful, she faced a difficult period due to the loss of backing from a major agency, as well as her personal life with marriage, childbirth and divorce. Meanwhile, the gradual dissolution of the trio "Spark Sannin Musume" and the rise of younger artists such as "Shin Sannin Musume" (Rumiko Koyanagi, Saori Minami and Mari Amachi) and "Hana no Chūsan" (Masako Mori, Junko Sakurada, and Momoe Yamaguchi) led to a temporary decline in her career.

A turning point occurred when she became the principal host of TBS music program Sound in "S" (サウンド・イン"S") from 1977 to 1981. The program helped her regain recognition as a "mature vocalist". Focusing on Western music, a genre in which she excelled, the program occasionally featured her performing duets with guest artists. She also regularly closed the music program by singing classic standard songs by pianist Yuzuru Sera (世良 譲).

In addition to her solo performances, she has reunited with other members of "Spark Sannin Musume" for concert tours and joint television appearances.

With David Matthews of the Manhattan Jazz Quintet serving as producer, she released her 60th-anniversary album, Memories of Me, on 3 April 2013. Marking the 60th anniversary of her singing career, she held a concert at the Ōwada Sakura Hall in Shibuya, on 20 April 2013.

On 13 October 2010, she appeared alongside her daughter Hiromi (宙美), on TV Asahi series Tetsuko no Heya (徹子の部屋), and they performed a duet. Seven years later, on 25 August 2017, she appeared with her ex-husband Mitsuo Sagawa (佐川 満男) and Hiromi as a trio. On 16 July 2018, the three of them made a friendly reappearance together.

On 5 August 2019, she appeared alongside Mari Sono of "Spark Sannin Musume". On 13 May 2022, Mari Sono, Mie Nakao and Yukari Itō appeared together. On 11 October 2023, she appeared solo on a TV program; on 31 January 2024, she appeared with Mie Nakao. During the COVID-19 pandemic, she performed concerts alongside her daughter Hiromi, at locations such as Nagashima Onsen.

On 18 July 2024, she held a dinner show with Mie Nakao at Shikisai in Hamana Lake Lakeside Plaza.

== Personal life ==
Yukari Itō was married to singer and actor Mitsuo Sagawa from 1971 to 1975. Their daughter Hiromi (宙美) is also a singer. Yukari Itō retained custody of their daughter following the divorce.

Her ex-husband Mitsuo Sagawa passed away at the age of 84 on 12 April 2024.
