= Kazuo Funaki =

Japanese Enka singer (born 1944)

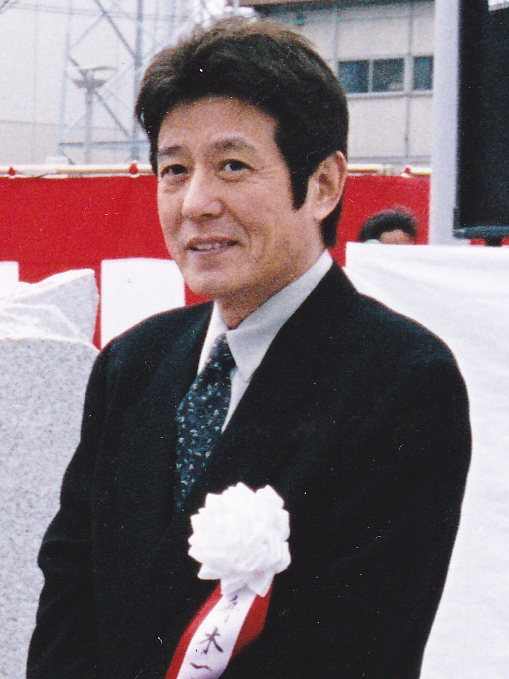
April 2002

Kazuo Funaki (舟木 一夫, born 12 December 1944 in Ichinomiya, Aichi) is a Japanese Enka singer. Kazuo also has a career as a stage actor, film actor, and TV actor.

His real name is Shigeyuki Ueda (上田 成幸).

== Discography ==
- Koukou San Nen Sei (高校三年生, High School Senior) : the singer's debut in 1963
- Zessyo (絶唱, The soulful singer) : 1966
- Hatsukoi (初恋, First Love)

== Filmography ==
- Koukou San Nen Sei
- Gakuen hiroba (学園広場, School playground)

== TV actor ==
- Taiga drama
  - Akō Rōshi (1964), Yatō Emoshichi
  - Minamoto no Yoshitsune (1966), Taira no Atsumori
  - Haru no Sakamichi (1971), Tokugawa Tadanaga
  - Motonari Mori (1997), Mukunashi Kagekatsu
- Audrey (2000–01), Kintarō Kuribe
- Mito Kōmon (2000–02), Yoichi, Tokugawa Mitsusada
