= Mari Sono =

Japanese singer and actress

Mariko Sonobe (1944–2024), known as Mari Sono (Japanese: 園まり), was a Japanese singer and actress.

== Discography ==
=== Singles ===
She released the following singles, amongst others:

- Nanimo Iwanaide (Japanese: 何も云わないで) (1964) This song reached number 3 on the weekly Japanese local singles chart published in Cash Box. It reached number 7 on the weekly Japanese singles chart published in Billboard. It reached number 8 in the 1965 Japanese kayokyoku annual singles chart published in Billboard.
- Aitakute Aitakute (Japanese: 逢いたくて逢いたくて) (1966). This song reached number 1 on the weekly Japanese singles chart published in Billboard, and the weekly Japanese local singles chart published in Cash Box. It reached number 10 in the 1966 Japanese kayokyoku annual singles chart published in Billboard.
- Yasashii Ame (1966). The song on the B side is "Nandemonai-Wa" (Japanese: 何んでもないわ). The song "Nandemonai-Wa" reached number 1 on the weekly Japanese local singles chart published in Cash Box.
- Yume Wa Yoru Hiraku (Japanese: 夢は夜ひらく) (1966). This song reached number 1 on the weekly Japanese singles chart published in Billboard, and the weekly Japanese local singles chart published in Cash Box. It reached number 5 in the 1966 Japanese kayokyoku annual singles chart published in Billboard.
- Kaeritaku Naino (Japanese: 帰りたくないの) (1967). This song reached number 5 on the weekly Japanese singles chart published in Billboard. It reached number 1 on the weekly Japanese local singles chart published in Cash Box.
- Ai Wa Oshiminaku (Japanese: 愛は惜しみなく) (1967). This song reached number 4 on the weekly Japanese singles chart published in Billboard on 4 November 1967. It reached number 5 according to the weekly Oricon local singles chart published in Billboard on 11 November 1967. It reached number 19 on the weekly Oricon singles chart published in Billboard on 18 November 1967. According to the Oricon website, this song reached number 36 on the weekly Oricon Singles Chart that officially began on 4 January 1968. This is the theme song of the film Ai Wa Oshiminaku.
- Aijo (Japanese: 愛情) (1967). This song reached number 25 on the weekly Oricon singles chart.
- Anata No Toriko (Japanese: あなたのとりこ) (1968). This song reached number 36 on the weekly Oricon singles chart.

=== Albums ===
Her albums include, amongst others:

- Yume Wa Yoru Hiraku (Japanese: 夢は夜ひらく) (1993)
- Super Best 3: Yume Wa Yoru Hiraku (Japanese: スーパー・ベスト3～夢は夜ひらく) (1993)
- Mari-chan No Hit Album (Japanese: まりちゃんのヒット・アルバム) (1997)
- Hit Collection (Japanese: ヒット・コレクション) (1998)
- Sono Mari Deluxe . . . (Japanese: 園まりデラックス～まりちゃんとデート～) (2007)

== Film ==
She starred in Hai Hai Sannin Musume (1963). She also appeared in the film Crazy Ogon Sakusen (Kureizi Ogon Sakusen) (1967), released in the United States as "Las Vegas Free-for-All" (1968).

== Awards ==
She received an award (kōrōshō, 功労賞) at the 61st Japan Record Awards in 2019.
