= Jun Mayuzumi =

Japanese singer (born 1948)

Jun Mayuzumi (黛ジュン; born 26 May 1948, in Chōfu, Tokyo) is a Japanese singer. Her best known songs include "Tenshi-no Yūwaku" (Angel's Temptation 1968). She won a Japan Record Award in 1969, and won the inaugural Yamaha Popular Song Contest Grand Prix at the Nemu no Sato Indoor Hall, on November 5, 1970. She appeared on the New Year's Eve Kōhaku Uta Gassen show for four years, 1967-1970.

== Discography ==
Singles

- Koi no Hallelujah (1967. 2. 15) Sold over a million units, but was released before the Oricon charts were established. Covered by Yoko Oginome in 1994.
- Otome no Inori (1968. 1. 5) Oricon position: 2
- Tenshi no Yūwaku (1968. 5. 1) Oricon position: 3
- Yūdzuki (1968. 9. 10) Oricon position: 2
- Fushigina Taiyō (1969. 2. 21) Oricon position: 12
- Kumoni noritai (1969. 6. 1) Oricon position: 4
- Doyō no Yoru Nanika ga Okiru (1969. 12. 20) Oricon position: 15
- Jiyū no Megami (1970. 5. 25) Oricon position: 6
- Ji wa Nagareru (1970. 9. 5) Oricon position: 17
- Yūshū (1971. 3. 1) Oricon position: 32
- Totemo Fukōna Asa ga Kita (1971. 7. 25) Oricon position: 54
- Yuki ga Furunoni (1971. 12)
- Hadashi no Yōsei (1972. 3. 25) Oricon position: 67
- To wa Hitotsu (1972. 8. 5) Oricon position: 58
- Basu wo Oritara (1972. 12)
- Kawagishi (1973. 5)
- Rorie no Kizuato (1973. 11)
- Fuyu Keshō (1974. 10. 10) Oricon position: 58
- Kanpai (1975. 3. 10)
- Kaze no Daichi no Komoriuta (Africa no Theme)/African Night (1980. 2. 25) Oricon position: 32
- etc.

== Kōhaku Uta Gassen Appearances ==
Year	#	Song	No.	VS	Remarks
1967 (Showa 42)/18th	1	Kiri No Kanatani (霧のかなたに, Beyond The Fog)	18/23	Akira Ichirou	
1968 (Showa 43)/19th	2	Tenshi No Yuwaku (天使の誘惑, Angel Love)	22/23	Shinichi Mori	Second Finale
1969 (Showa 44)/20th	3	Kumoninoritai (雲にのりたい, Among The Clouds)	14/23	Sagawa Mitsuo	
1970 (Showa 45)/21st	4	Doyō No Yoru Nanikagaokiru (土曜の夜何かが起きる, Something Feelin' And It's A Saturday Night)	6/24	Yukio Hashi	
