= Tokiko Iwatani =

Japanese lyricist, poet and translator

Tokiko Iwatani (岩谷時子, Iwatani Tokiko; March 28, 1916 – October 25, 2013) was a Japanese lyricist, poet, and translator.

Born Tokiko Iwatani (岩谷トキ子, Iwatani Tokiko) in Seoul, Korea, she moved with her family to Japan at the age of 5, where they settled in Nishinomiya, Hyogo Prefecture. After attending schools in her hometown she entered the English Literature Department of Kobe College, and graduated in 1939. She then joined the publishing department of the Takarazuka Revue, where she became acquainted with the future star Fubuki Koshiji. When Koshiji decided to leave the revue in 1951 to join Tōei and become an actress and singer, Iwatani also quit the company, and moved to Tokyo with Koshiji, whose manager she was for about 30 years, until Koshiji died in 1980.

After becoming a full-time independent lyricist in 1963, she wrote the lyrics to or translated over 3000 songs, for singers or groups including The Peanuts, Yūzō Kayama, Frank Nagai, Hiromi Go, and translated the lyrics of, among others, Hymne à l'amour, Save the Last Dance for Me, Million Roses, My Way, and the musicals Kiss Me, Kate, Anne of Green Gables – The Musical, Me and My Girl, and Les Misérables.

In 2010 she established the Iwatani Tokiko Foundation, which awards the annual ¥3,000,000 yen Iwatani Tokiko Award.

She died in October 2013 from pneumonia.

== Awards ==
- Kazuo Kikuta Drama Award, Special Prize (1979)
- Order of the Sacred Treasure, 4th Class (1993)
- Shin Watanabe Award, Special Prize (2006)
- Person of Cultural Merit, 2009
