= Harumi Miyako =

Japanese singer and actress

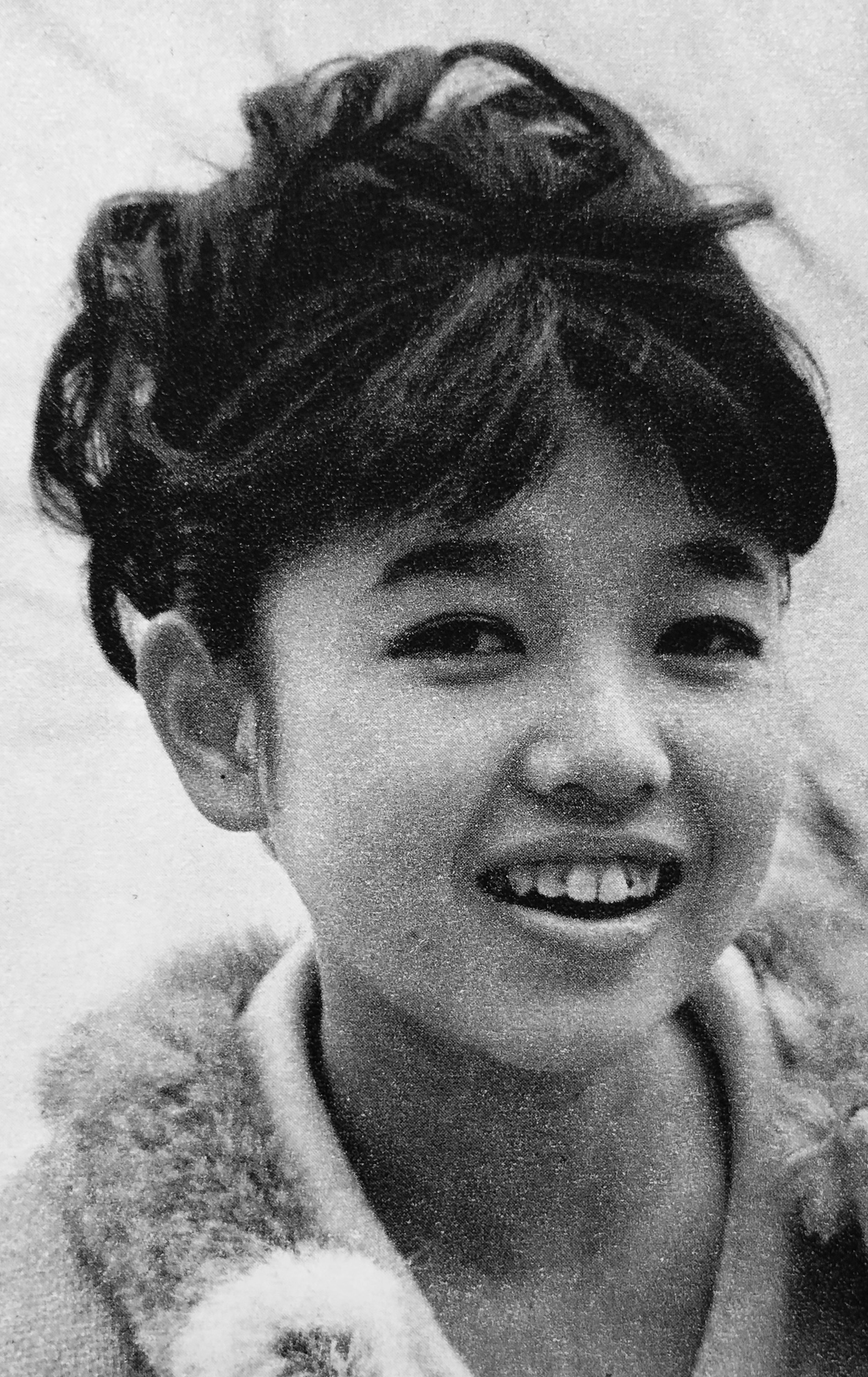

Background information
- Born: Kitamura Harumi (北村春美); Lee Chun-mi (이춘미); 22 February 1948 (age 77); Kyoto, Japan

Harumi Miyako (都 はるみ, Miyako Harumi; born 22 February 1948), born Harumi Kitamura (北村春美, Kitamura Harumi) in Kyoto, is a Japanese enka singer. She made her debut in 1964. She has appeared on the annual television special Kōhaku Uta Gassen.

== Retirement and return to singing ==
In 1984, Miyako announced that she would retire. Three years later, she returned to the music industry as a producer, conducting nationwide auditions and launching the short-lived career of her protégé Sakura Yamato. In 1989, Miyako appeared on the 40th edition of Kōhaku Uta Gassen, and in 1990, she officially resumed her singing career.

== Filmography ==
- Tora-san's Song of Love (Yoji Yamada, 1983): Harumi Kyo, a popular enka singer
