= Yukio Hashi =

Japanese enka singer and actor (1943–2025)

Yukio Hashi 橋 幸夫
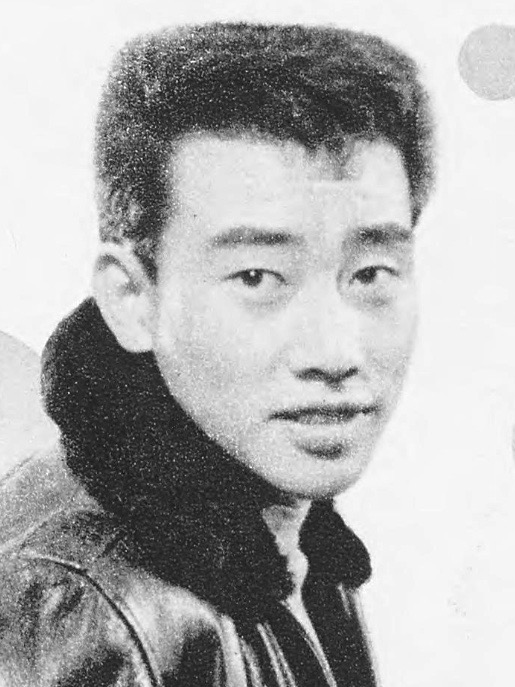
- Hashi, 1963

Background information
- Birth name: 橋 幸男
- Born: 3 May 1943 Arakawa, Tokyo, Japan
- Died: 4 September 2025 (aged 82)
- Genres: Enka
- Occupations: Singer; actor
- Years active: 1960–2024
- Labels: JVC Entertainment

Japanese name
- Kanji: 橋 幸夫
Transcriptions
- Romanization: Hashi Yukio

Yukio Hashi (Japanese: 橋 幸夫; 3 May 1943 – 4 September 2025) was a Japanese enka singer and actor. His real name is Yukio Hashi (橋 幸男), using a different kanji. He died on 4 September 2025, at the age of 82.

== Discography ==
- Itsudemo yume wo (いつでも夢を, Our continuing dreams) : Co-starring with Sayuri Yoshinaga (1962)
- Itako Gasa (潮来笠, Conical Asian hat wearers in Itako)

== Filmography ==
=== Film ===
His filmography includes 36 films:

- Itakogasa (1961)
- Okese utaeba (1961)
- Tsukiyo no wataridori (1963)
- Itsudemo yume o (1963)
- Koi to namida no taiyô (1966)
- Yoake no futari (1968)

=== Television ===
- Mito Komon (????)
- No Side Manager (2019)

Preceded by	Japan Record Award for Best New Artist; 1960	Succeeded by Miki Nakasone; Miyuki Yamanaka; Kōji Hirano; Akira Matsushima; Tatsumi Fujino; Utako Yanagi
