= Japan Record Award for Best Album =

Japanese music award

- Country: Japan
- Presented by: Japan Composers' Association
- First award: 1980
- Final award: 2019

The Japan Record Award for Best Album ("最優秀アルバム賞") is awarded annually, but was suspended in 2006, 2007, 2020 to 2022. The top honor for albums was named the Album Grand Prix Award ("アルバム大賞") until 2001, when it was replaced by the Best Album award ("ベストアルバム賞"), and underwent another Japanese name change in 2008.

== 1980s ==
Year	Artist	Album	Ref.
1980	Tsuyoshi Nagabuchi; Yellow Magic Orchestra; Tatsuro Yamashita	Gyakuryū; Solid State Survivor; Moonglow	
1981	Off Course; Yumi Matsutoya; Eiichi Ohtaki	We Are; Mizu no Naka no Asia e A Long Vacation	
1982	Miyuki Nakajima; Southern All Stars; Yumi Matsutoya	Kansuigyo; Nude Man; Pearl Pierce	
1983	Southern All Stars; Seiko Matsuda; Yumi Matsutoya	Kirei; Utopia; Reincarnation	
1984	Mariko Takahashi	Triad	
1985	Yōsui Inoue	9.5 Karat	
1986	Seiko Matsuda	Supreme	
1987	Tsuyoshi Nagabuchi	License	
1988	Kyosuke Himuro	Flowers for Algernon	
1989	Anri	Circuit of Rainbow	

== 1990s ==
Year	Artist	Album	Ref.
1990	Gye Eun-Suk (Kayōkyoku/Enka); Unicorn (Pop/Rock)	Mayonaka no Shower (Kayōkyoku/Enka); Kedamono no Arashi (Pop/Rock)	
1991	Takao Horiuchi (Kayōkyoku/Enka); Tatsuro Yamashita (Pop/Rock)	Gents (Kayōkyoku/Enka); Artisan (Pop/Rock)	
1992	Fuyumi Sakamoto (Kayōkyoku/Enka); Southern All Stars (Pop/Rock)	Otokobore (Kayōkyoku/Enka); Yo ni Manyō no Hana ga Sakunari (Pop/Rock)	
1993	Mariya Takeuchi	Quiet Life	
1994	Keisuke Kuwata	Kodoku no Taiyō	
1995	Eiichi Arai	Kiyokawa no Michi: 48-ban	
1996	Globe	Globe	
1997	Glay	Beloved	
1998	Every Little Thing	Time to Destination	
1999	Hikaru Utada	First Love	

== 2000s ==
Year	Artist	Album	Ref.
2000	Ayumi Hamasaki	Duty	
2001	Gospellers	Love Notes	
2002	Chitose Hajime	Hummingbird (ハミングバード)	
2003	Mika Nakashima	Love	
2004	Hiroshi Itsuki	Onna no Ehon (おんなの絵本)	
2005	Ketsumeishi	Ketsunopolis4 (ケツノポリス4)	
2006	—	—	
2007	—	—	
2008	Namie Amuro	Best Fiction	
2009	GReeeeN	Shio, Koshō (塩、コショウ "Salt & Pepper")	

== 2010s ==
Year	Artist	Album	Ref.
2010	Ikimonogakari	Hajimari no Uta (ハジマリノウタ First Song)	
2011	Kazumasa Oda	Domo (どーも)	
2012	Kana Nishino	Love Place	
2013	Yuzu	Land	
2014	Mariya Takeuchi	Trad	
2015	Southern All Stars	Budou (葡萄, Grape)	
2016	Hikaru Utada	Fantôme	
2017	Suchmos	The Kids	
2018	Kenshi Yonezu	Bootleg	
2019	The Yellow Monkey	9999	

== 2020s ==
Due to the COVID-19 pandemic, the Best Album award was not presented from 2020 to 2022.

Year	Artist	Album	Ref.
2020	—	—	
2021	—	—	
2022	—	—	
