= Kazumasa Oda discography =

Recordings by Japanese singer-songwriter

- Studio albums: 10
- Live albums: 1
- Compilation albums: 6
- Singles: 30
- Video albums: 3
- Cover albums: 2

The discography of Japanese singer-songwriter Kazumasa Oda consists of ten studio albums, one love album, six compilation albums, two cover albums, three video albums, and thirty solo singles. Oda began his career as a performer of the folk-rock band Off Course. He began releasing solo material in 1985. His 1991 single "Oh! Yeah!" / "Love Story wa Totsuzen ni" topped the Oricon Singles Chart and was certified two-times million by the Recording Industry Association of Japan (RIAJ). When his 2016 compilation album Ano Hi Ano Toki topped the Oricon Albums Chart, Oda became the oldest artist in the country to achieve the accomplishment.

== Studio albums ==
Title	Album details	Peak chart positions	Sales (JPN)	Certifications
Title	Album details	JPN	Sales (JPN)	Certifications
K. Oda	Released: December 4, 1986; Label: Fun House; Format(s): LP, CD, cassette	4	59,000	
Between the Word & the Heart	Released: March 5, 1988; Label: Fun House; Format(s): LP, CD	3	119,000	
Far East Café	Released: May 9, 1990; Label: Fun House, Little Tokyo; Format(s): CD	1	320,000	JPN: Gold
Sometime Somewhere	Released: January 25, 1992; Label: Fun House, Little Tokyo; Format(s): CD	1	656,000	JPN: Gold
My Home Town	Released: October 27, 1993; Label: Fun House, Little Tokyo; Format(s): CD	2	175,000	
Kojinshugi (個人主義; "Individualism")	Released: April 19, 2000; Label: Fun House, Little Tokyo; Format(s): CD	4	293,000	JPN: Gold
Sō kana (そうかな; "Is That Right")	Released: June 15, 2005; Label: BMG Fun House, Little Tokyo; Format(s): CD	1	573,000	JPN: 2× Platinum
Dōmo (どーも; "Hi")	Released: April 20, 2011; Label: Little Tokyo, Ariola Japan; Format(s): CD	1	192,000	JPN: Platinum
Oda Biyori (小田日和; "Oda Weather")	Released: July 2, 2014; Label: Little Tokyo, Ariola Japan; Format(s): CD	3	155,000	JPN: Gold
Early Summer 2022	Released: June 15, 2022; Label: Ariola Japan; Format(s): CD	3	45,560	

== Live albums ==
Title	Album details	Peak chart positions	Sales (JPN)
Title	Album details	JPN	Sales (JPN)
Kitto! (きっと!)	Released: September 30, 2026; Label: Ariola Japan; Format(s): 2×CD	2	32,640

== Compilation albums ==
Title	Album details	Peak chart positions	Sales (JPN)	Certifications
Title	Album details	JPN	Sales (JPN)	Certifications
Oh! Yeah!	Released: May 18, 1991; Label: Little Tokyo, Fun House; Format(s): CD	1	1,258,000	JPN: 3× Platinum
Tsutaetai Koto ga Aru n da (伝えたいことがあるんだ; "I Have Something to Tell You")	Released: November 21, 1997; Label: Little Tokyo, Fun House; Format(s): CD	7	224,000	JPN: Gold
Jiko Best (自己ベスト; "Personal Best")	Released: April 24, 2002; Label: Little Tokyo, BMG Fun House; Format(s): CD	1	2,339,000	JPN: 2× Million
Jiko Best-2 (自己ベスト-2; "Personal Best 2")	Released: November 28, 2007; Label: Little Tokyo, BMG Japan; Format(s): CD	1	478,000	JPN: 2× Platinum
Ano Hi Ano Toki (あの日 あの時; "That Day, That Time")	Released: April 20, 2016; Label: Ariola Japan; Format(s): CD	1	395,000	JPN: Platinum
Jiko Best-3 (自己ベスト-3; "Personal Best 3")	Released: November 27, 2024; Label: Ariola Japan; Format(s): CD	2	51,149	

== Cover albums ==
Title	Album details	Peak chart positions	Sales (JPN)	Certifications
Title	Album details	JPN	Sales (JPN)	Certifications
Looking Back	Released: February 1, 1996; Label: Little Tokyo, Fun House; Format(s): CD	1	597,000	JPN: Platinum
Looking Back 2	Released: May 16, 2001; Label: Little Tokyo, BMG Fun House; Format(s): CD	1	606,000	JPN: Platinum

== Singles ==
=== As lead artist ===
List of singles, with selected chart positions
Title	Year	Peak chart positions		Sales (JPN)	Certifications	Album
Title	Year	JPN Oricon	JPN Hot 100 (Note: The Japan Hot 100 was established in 2008.) (Note: Sources for chart positions are as follows: "Kyō mo Dokoka de", "Sayonara wa Iwanai", "Goodbye", "Tashika na Koto", and "Sono Hi ga Kuru made".)	Sales (JPN)	Certifications	Album
"1985"	1986	15	—	42,000		K. Oda
"Boku no Okurimono" (僕の贈りもの; "My Present")	1988	37	—	14,000		Between the Word & the Heart
"Little Tokyo"	1989	3	—	220,000		Far East Café
"Kimi ni Merry Xmas" (君にMerry Xmas; "Merry Christmas to You")	1989	6	—	160,000		—N/a
"Koi wa Ōsawagi" (恋は大騒ぎ; "Love Is an Uproar")	1990	5	—	96,000		Far East Café
"Oh! Yeah!"	1991	1	—	2,588,000	JPN (physical): 2× Million	Oh! Yeah!
"Love Story wa Totsuzen ni" (ラブ・ストーリーは突然に; "Love Stories Are Sudden")	1991	1	— (Note: Charted at number 92 on the Radio Songs Chart in 2013 and at number 44 on the Japan Adult Contemporary Airplay Chart in 2014.)	2,588,000	JPN (cellphone): Gold; JPN (download): Platinum	Oh! Yeah!
"Anata o Mistumete" (あなたを見つめて; "I'm Staring at You")	1991	6	—	209,000		Sometime Somewhere
"Itsuka Dokoka de" (いつか どこかで; "Sometime Somewhere")	1992	5	—	360,000		Sometime Somewhere
"Sono Mama no Kimi ga Suki" (そのままの君が好き; "I Like You As You Are")	1992	14	—	158,000		My Home Town
"Midori no Hibi" (緑の日々; "Green Days")	1993	19	—	91,000		—N/a
"Kaze no Sakamichi" (風の坂道; "Windy Hill Path")	1993	9	—	91,000		My Home Town
"Manatsu no Koi" (真夏の恋; "Midsummer Love")	1994	10	—	169,000		—N/a
"So Long My Love"	1995	10	—	88,000		—N/a
"Kimi to no Omoide" (君との思い出; "Memories with You")	1995	23	—	79,000		—N/a
"Tōi Umibe" (遠い海辺; "Distant Seaside")	1997	24	—	27,000		Tsutaetai Koto ga Aru n da
"Tsutaetai Koto ga Arunda"	1997	8	—	280,000	JPN (physical): Gold	Tsutaetai Koto ga Aru n da
"Midori no Machi" (緑の街; "Green Town")	1997	30	—	48,000		Tsutaetai Koto ga Aru n da
"Konna Hi datta ne" (こんな日だったね; "It Was This Day, Wasn't It")	1999	23	—	28,000		Kojinshugi
"Woh Woh"	2000	18	—	52,000		Kojinshugi
"Kaze no Michi" (風の街; "Wind Path")	2001	22	—	32,000		Looking Back 2
"Kira Kira" (キラキラ; "Sparkling")	2002	3	— (Note: Charted at number 89 on the Japan Adult Contemporary Airplay Chart in 2015.)	299,000	JPN (physical): Gold; JPN (download): Gold	—N/a
"Masshiro" (まっ白; "Pure White")	2004	4	— (Note: Charted at number 74 on the Japan Adult Contemporary Airplay Chart in 2014.)	84,000	JPN (physical): Gold	Sō kana
"Tashika na Koto" (たしかなこと; "Sure Thing")	2005	8	65 (Note: Charted in 2011.)	62,000	JPN (physical): Gold; JPN (ringtone): 2× Platinum; JPN (cellphone): Gold; JPN (download): 2× Platinum; JPN (streaming): Gold	Sō kana
"Daijōbu" (ダイジョウブ; "Okay")	2007	6	—	58,000	JPN (physical): Gold	—N/a
"Kokoro" (こころ; "Heart")	2007	1	—	103,000	JPN (physical): Gold; JPN (ringtone): 2× Platinum; JPN (cellphone): Gold	Jiko Best-2
"Kyō mo Dokoka de" (今日も どこかで; "Somewhere Today")	2008	4	4	37,000		Dōmo
"Sayonara wa Iwanai" (さよならは 言わない; "Don't Say Goodbye")	2009	5	11	33,000		Dōmo
"Goodbye" (グッバイ, Gubbai)	2010	15	5	15,000		Dōmo
"Sono Hi ga Kuru made" (その日が来るまで; "Until That Day Comes")	2013	10	19	11,000		Oda Biyori
"Yasashii Kaze ga Fuitara" (やさしい風が吹いたら; "When the Gentle Wind Blows")	2013	10	— (Note: Charted at number 24 on the Japan Radio Songs Chart.)	11,000		Oda Biyori
"Kono Michi Wo / Ai ni Iku / Sakamichi wo Agatte / CHiisana Fuukei" (この道を / 会いに行く / 坂道を上って / 小さな風景)	2018	4	—	—	—	early summer 2022
"—" denotes items which were released before the creation of the Billboard Japan Hot 100, or items that did not chart.

==== Digital singles ====
Year	Single	Reference
2021	"Kaze wo Matte" (風を待って)	
2021	"Kondo Kimi to" (こんど、君と)	
2022	"So far so good"	
2023	"What's your message"	

=== As a featured artist ===
List of singles, with selected chart positions
Title	Year	Peak chart positions		Sales (JPN)	Certifications	Album
Title	Year	JPN Oricon	JPN Hot 100 (Note: Sources for chart positions are as follows: "Dear Mama", "Waratte Misete Kure", "Koi Bus", "Kimi Sae Ireba", and "A Christmas Song".)	Sales (JPN)	Certifications	Album
"Ima Dakara" (今だから; "Because It's Now") (Yumi Matsutoya with Kazumasa Oda and Kazuo Zaitsu)	1985	1	—	367,000		—N/a
"Bokura ga Umareta Ano Hi no Yō ni" (僕らが生まれたあの日のように; "Like Those Days We Were Born") (as a part of Used to Be a Child)	1993	2	—	652,000		—N/a
"Christmas ga Sugite mo" (クリスマスが過ぎても; "Even Though Christmas Has Already Passed") (as a part of Plus One)	1996	14	—	98,000		—N/a
"Christmas no Yakusoku" (クリスマスの約束; "Christmas Promise") (as Yuzu Oda)	2006	2	—	120,000	JPN (physical): Gold	—N/a
"Red Ribbon Spiritual Song (Umarekuru Kodomotachi no Tame ni)" (生まれ来る子供たちのために; "For Children Who Are Yet to Be Born") (as a part of Aids Charity Project)	2007	4	—	56,000		—N/a
"Dear Mama" (LGYankees featuring Kazumasa Oda)	2008	12	43	13,000		No Doubt!!! (No Limit)
"Waratte Misete Kure" (笑ってみせてくれ; "Give Laughing a Go") (with Band for "Sanka")	2008	35	82	6,000		—N/a
"Koi Bus" (恋バス; "Love Bus") (Hitomi Yaida and Koi Bus Band with Kazumasa Oda)	2008	26	27	5,000		Colorhythm
"Kimi Sae Ireba" (君さえいれば; "If I Have Just You") (Shota Shimizu featuring Kazumasa Oda)	2012	15	39	9,000		Naturally
"A Christmas Song" (Monkey Majik with Kazumasa Oda)	2012	22	8	5,000		DNA
"—" denotes items which were released before the creation of the Billboard Japan Hot 100, or items that did not chart.

=== Other charted songs ===
List of songs not released as singles or promotional singles, with selected chart positions and certifications
Title	Year	Peak chart positions			Certifications	Album
Title	Year	JPN Hot 100 (Note: Sources for chart positions are as follows: "Kotae", "Ai ni Naru", "Sonna Koto yori Shiawase ni Narō", and "Kaze wa Yanda".)	RIAJ monthly ringtones (Note: The RIAJ "Reco-kyō" monthly ringtone chart is a deprecated chart that ran from 2006 until 2009.) (Note: Sources for chart positions are as follows: "Kotoba ni Dekinai".)	RIAJ Digital Track Chart (Note: The RIAJ Digital Track Chart is a deprecated chart that ran from 2009 until early 2012 and tracked full-length cellphone downloads.) (Note: Sources for chart positions as follows: "Kotoba ni Dekinai" and "Tokyo no Sora",)	Certifications	Album
"Kotoba ni Dekinai" (言葉にできない; "Indescribable")	1982	—	30	62 (Note: Charted in 2010.)	JPN (download): 2× Platinum; JPN (cellphone): Gold	"Kotoba ni Dekinai" (single) / Looking Back 2
"Kotae" (こたえ; "Answer")	2011	67	—	—		Domo
"Tokyo no Sora" (東京の空; "Tokyo Sky")	2011	—	—	65		Domo
"Ai ni Naru" (愛になる; "Becoming Love")	2014	51	—	—		Oda Biyori
"Sonna Koto yori Shiawase ni Narō" (そんなことより幸せになろう; "Instead of That, Let's Be Happy")	2014	91	—	—		Oda Biyori
"Kaze wa Yanda" (風は止んだ; "The Wind Has Stopped")	2016	75	—	—		Ano Hi Ano Toki
"—" denotes items which were released before the creation of the Billboard Japan Hot 100, the RIAJ Charts, or items that did not chart.

== Videography ==
=== Video albums ===
List of media, with selected chart positions
Title	Album details	Peak positions	
Title	Album details	JPN DVD	JPN Blu-ray
K. Oda Tour 1997–1998 Thru the Window Live	Released: June 24, 1998; Label: Fun House; Format(s): VHS, DVD	200 (Note: Charted in 2003.)	—
Oda Kazumasa Countdown Live Chotto Samuikedo Minna de Same Moon!! (小田和正カウントダウン・ライブ ちょっと寒いけど みんなでＳＡＭＥ ＭＯＯＮ！！)	Released: May 16, 2001; Label: BMG Fun House; Format(s): VHS, DVD	15	—
Oda Kazumasa Concert "Domo Domo" Sono Hi ga Kuru made in Tokyo Dome (小田和正コンサート "どーもどーも"その日が来るまでin東京ドーム)	Released: November 21, 2012; Label: Ariola Japan, Little Tokyo; Format(s): DVD, Blu-ray	2	4
Oda Kazumasa Concert "Domo Domo" Sono Hi ga Kuru made in Tokyo Dome	Released: February 3, 2016; Label: Ariola Japan, Little Tokyo; Format(s): Blu-ray	-	-
K.ODA TOUR 1997-1998 THRU THE WINDOW	Released: February 3, 2016; Label: Ariola Japan; Format(s): Blu-ray	-	-
Kaze no Youni Uta ga Nagareteita (Kanzenban) (風のようにうたが流れていた (完全版))	Released: December 21, 2016; Label: Ariola Japan; Format(s): Blu-ray	-	-
Kazumasa Oda Tour 2019: Encore Encore in Saitama Super Arena	Released: November 27, 2019; Label: Ariola Japan; Format(s): DVD, Blu-ray	2	4
"—" denotes items that did not chart
