= Love Place =

Studio album by Kana Nishino
- Released: September 5, 2012
- Recorded: 2011–2012
- Genre: J-pop
- Length: 65:39
- Label: SME

Kana Nishino chronology
Thank You, Love (2011)	Love Place (2012)	With Love (2014)

Singles from Love Place
- 1. "Tatoe Donnani..." Released: November 9, 2011; 2. "Sakura, I Love You?" Released: March 7, 2012; 3. "Watashitachi" Released: March 23, 2012; 4. "Go For It!!" Released: July 25, 2012

Love Place is the fourth album by Japanese singer and songwriter Kana Nishino. It was released on September 5, 2012. It won Best Album at the 54th Japan Record Awards. It debuted and peaked at number two on the Oricon Albums Chart.

== Track listing ==
No.	Title	Length
1.	"*Prologue* 〜Welcome〜"	1:42
2.	"We (私たち)"	5:46
3.	"Day 7"	5:05
4.	"GO FOR IT!!"	3:34
5.	"Be Strong"	4:43
6.	"Happy Half Year!"	4:33
7.	"Love Song"	4:31
8.	"FANTASY"	3:25
9.	"Is this love?"	4:52
10.	"Honey"	4:22
11.	"SAKURA, I love you?"	4:39
12.	"no matter how (たとえ どんなに…)"	5:32
13.	"kiss & hug"	4:58
14.	"My Place"	5:56
15.	"*Epilogue* 〜Love Place〜"	1:41
Total length:		65:39

=== Limited edition DVD ===
Video Clips Vol.4

DVD
No.	Title	Length
1.	"Alright -Video Clip-"	5:30
2.	"Alright -Video Clip Making-"	3:45
3.	"たとえ どんなに… -Video Clip-"	5:58
4.	"たとえ どんなに… -Video Clip Making-"	4:02
5.	"SAKURA, I love you? -Video Clip-"	4:52
6.	"SAKURA, I love you? -Video Clip Making-"	3:32
7.	"私たち -Video Clip-"	6:43
8.	"私たち -Video Clip Making-"	3:34
9.	"GO FOR IT!! -Video Clip-"	4:02
10.	"GO FOR IT!! -Video Clip Making-"	3:45
Total length:		45:43

== Charts ==
Chart (2012)	Peak position
Japanese Albums (Oricon)	2

Preceded by Domo (Kazumasa Oda)	Japan Record Award for the Best Album; 2012	Succeeded by Land (Yuzu)
