= A Flood of Circle =

Japanese rock band

- Origin: Tokyo, Japan
- Genre: Blues rock
- Years active: 2006–present
- Labels: Crux; Speedstar; Imperial
- Members: Ryosuke Sasaki; Kazutaka Watanabe; Hisayo; Tetsu Aoki
- Past members: Masashi Okaniwa; Yasutaka Ishii; Duran
- Website: afloodofcircle.com

A Flood of Circle (Japanese: ア フラッド オブ サークル, Hepburn: A Furaddo obu Sākuru), abbreviated AFOC or Flood (フラッド, Furaddo), is a Japanese rock band formed in Tokyo in 2006 by vocalist and guitarist Ryosuke Sasaki and drummer Kazutaka Watanabe. Since 2018, the lineup has consisted of co-founders Sasaki and Watanabe, bassist Hisayo, and guitarist Tetsu Aoki. The band's sound mixes blues and rock and roll, and is easily identified by Sasaki's powerful vocals.

== History ==
A Flood of Circle was formed in Tokyo in 2006 with a lineup of vocalist and guitarist Ryosuke Sasaki, drummer Kazutaka Watanabe, guitarist Masashi Okaniwa, and bassist Yasutaka Ishii. The following year, they released their self-titled first mini-album on July 11. The band released the single "Buffalo Dance/Thunderbolt" only at Tower Records stores on March 4, 2009. They also contributed "Electric Stone" to the omnibus album Under Construction ~Rock'n'Roll Revival from Tokyo!!!~, which was released on the same day. On April 22, they made their major label debut on Speedstar Records with their first full-length album, Buffalo Soul produced by Junji Ishiwatari. In July, Okaniwa disappeared before the final concert of the band's nationwide tour. Although they were eventually able to confirm he was safe, the other members were unable to contact him for over three months and therefore announced his departure from A Flood of Circle on October 14. They released Paradox Parade, their second album, on November 18. It features guest guitarists Dai Okumura of Wash?, Eijun Suganami of The Back Horn, Takeo Noriaki of FoZZtone, and Takuro Yasutaka of Tsubakiya Quartette.

2010 saw the release of their first proper single "Human License" on July 21, and the release of their third album Zoomanity on September 15. On December 14, it was revealed that Ishii had informed the band that he wanted to leave on October 14 due to chronic tendonitis, which left him unable to play to his own satisfaction. The message also announced his replacement, female bassist Hisayo of the Tokyo Pinsalocks. The band's fourth album, Love is Like a Rock'n'Roll, was released on November 23, 2011. A Flood of Circle switched to Imperial Records on September 20, 2012, and released the mini-album Fuck Forever on December 5.

Former Rootless guitarist Duran joined the band in September 2014, and they released the album Golden Time on November 5. However, he left the group less than a year later on March 31, 2015. In an interview conducted with Natalie to explain the situation, Sasaki and Duran revealed it was due to the latter's commitments to his other band, Made in Asia, conflicting with those of Flood. In February 2016, A Flood of Circle traveled to the United Kingdom to record, and also performed their first three overseas concerts in London, where Sasaki lived as a child. They released their first compilation album, The Blue, on February 24. In June, the band held open auditions for a new guitarist. Tetsu Aoki was selected from the audition as a support member in September 2016, and the album New Tribe was released on January 18, 2017. Aoki became an official member of A Flood of Circle on February 17, 2018. Three days later, the band released their self-titled eighth studio album.

In 2019, A Flood of Circle released the album Center of the Earth on March 6, and the mini-album Heart on November 6. The former's single, "The Key", was used as the ending theme song for the Japanese anime adaptation of the Chinese manhua Ultramarine Magmell. The band's tenth album, 2020, was released on October 21, 2020.

As part of their 20th anniversary celebrations, A Flood of Circle held a tour from January 11 to April 28, 2026, where they performed with another act each night. The other acts included Nothing's Carved in Stone, Hitorie and Alexandros. Flood then held their first solo concert at the Nippon Budokan on May 6. The compilation album Kakumei Misui no Chō ga Miru Yume was released on August 5, and the tribute album Heartmark Shishū Shite Yaru yo, Chotto Wasureppoi Tamashī ni was released on November 4. The latter features artists such as 9mm Parabellum Bullet, Glim Spanky and Lisa covering Flood's songs.

== Members ==
Current members

- Ryosuke Sasaki (佐々木亮介) – vocals, guitar (2006–present)
- Kazutaka Watanabe (渡邊一丘) – drums (2006–present)
- Hisayo – bass (2010–present)
- Tetsu Aoki (アオキテツ) – guitar (2018–present; support member since 2016)

Former members

- Masashi Okaniwa (岡庭匡志) – guitar (2006–2009)
- Yasutaka Ishii (石井康崇) – bass (2006–2010)
- Duran – guitar (2014–2015)

== Discography ==
=== Studio albums ===
Title	Album details	Peak chart positions		
Title	Album details	JPN Oricon	JPN Billboard Hot	JPN Billboard Top
Buffalo Soul	Released: April 22, 2009; Label: Speedstar	103	—	86
Paradox Parade	Released: November 18, 2009; Label: Speedstar	81	—	71
Zoomanity	Released: September 15, 2010; Label: Speedstar	62	—	62
Love is Like a Rock'n'Roll	Released: November 23, 2011; Label: Speedstar	41	—	39
I'm Free	Released: July 17, 2013; Label: Imperial	35	—	31
Golden Time	Released: November 5, 2014; Label: Imperial	19	—	31
New Tribe	Released: January 18, 2017; Label: Imperial	37	52	30
A Flood of Circle	Released: February 21, 2018; Label: Imperial	16	32	16
Center of the Earth	Released: March 6, 2019; Label: Imperial	46	63	36
2020	Released: October 21, 2020; Label: Imperial	41	43	38
Densetsu no Yoru o Kimi to 伝説の夜を君と	Released: December 22, 2021; Label: Imperial	72	73	60
Hana Furu Sora ni Fumetsu no Uta o 花降る空に不滅の歌を	Released: February 15, 2023; Label: Imperial	35	31	29
Wild Bunny Blues / No Usagi no Blues WILD BUNNY BLUES / のうさぎのブルース	Released: November 6, 2024; Label: Imperial	38	40	32
Yozora ni Kakaru Niji 夜空に架かる虹	Released: November 6, 2025; Label: Imperial	38	—	36
"—" denotes a recording released before the creation of the Hot Albums chart, or that did not chart.

=== Mini-albums ===
Title	Album details	Peak chart positions		
Title	Album details	JPN Oricon	JPN Billboard Hot	JPN Billboard Top
A Flood of Circle	Released: July 11, 2007; Label: Crux	—	—	—
Doromizu no Melody 泥水のメロディー	Released: May 14, 2008; Label: Crux	—	—	—
Fuck Forever	Released: December 5, 2012; Label: Imperial	61	—	—
Best Ride ベストライド	Released: June 17, 2015; Label: Imperial	28	53	33
Heart	Released: November 6, 2019; Label: Imperial	45	66	37
Candle Songs	Released: March 13, 2024; Label: Imperial	35	34	26
"—" denotes a recording released before the creation of the Billboard chart, or that did not chart.

=== Live albums ===
Title	Album details	Peak chart positions		
Title	Album details	JPN Oricon	JPN Billboard Hot	JPN Billboard Top
Before the Flood Three	Released: December 3, 2008; Label: Crux	—	—	—
Live! for All the Young Rock'n'Rollers	Released: October 5, 2013; Label: Tsutaya	—	—	—
"—" denotes a recording released before the creation of the Hot albums chart, or that did not chart.

=== Compilation albums ===
Title	Album details	Peak chart positions		
Title	Album details	JPN Oricon	JPN Billboard Hot	JPN Billboard Top
The Blue	Released: February 24, 2016; Label: Imperial	30	46	25
Kakumei Misui no Chō ga Miru Yume 革命未遂の蝶が見る夢	Released: August 5, 2026; Label: Imperial	19	—	19
"—" denotes a recording that did not chart.
