= Rootless =

Rootless may refer to:

- System Integrity Protection, a security feature of the operating system macOS, sometimes referred to as rootless.
- Rootless, a mode of operation of an X Window System server.

== Music ==
- Rootless (band), a Japanese rock band.
- "Rootless", a song by Marina and the Diamonds from The Family Jewels.
