= Duran (Japanese musician) =

Japanese musician and songwriter (born 1984)

Duran 内藤デュラン晴久
- Born: Haruhisa Duran Naito; Yamanashi, Japan
- Genre: Rock
- Occupations: Guitarist, Singer, Songwriter
- Instruments: Vocals, Guitar, Piano, Bass, Drums
- Years active: 2006–present
- Labels: Electric Gospel Records; Friendship Records
- Member of: DURAN
- Formerly of: Rootless, a flood of circle, Made in Asia
- Website: duranofficial.com

Duran (Japanese: 内藤デュラン晴久, Hepburn: Naito Duran Haruhisa) (stylized as DURAN) is a guitarist, singer, songwriter of Japanese, Filipino and Spanish heritage, member of a 3–member band under his name.

== Early life ==
Duran, born of a Japanese mother and Spanish-Filipino father, influenced by his bassist father and musicians such as Jimi Hendrix, Led Zeppelin, Prince and Michael Jackson, began playing piano at the age of three and the guitar at fourteen.

== Career ==
By 2009, Duran was member of a band of street musicians known as Rootless, performing with them until 2013. He was also member of the bands a flood of circle and Made in Asia.

Duran has also worked with artists such as Koshi Inaba (B’z), Shikao Suga, Kiyoharu, Nariaki Obukuro and Exile Atsushi. Together with Atsushi, Fuyu and Phekoo, he is part of the band Red Diamond Dogs.

In 2017 he began solo activities, debuting officially in 2018 with the release of his first album, "Face", which features artists Shikao Suga, Kiyoharu and Katsuma (coldrain) as guests.

Duran has performed live shows in various countries including the Philippines, Singapore, Taiwan, Hong Kong, France, United States. He has also been featured on the American Blues Scene website, covering the American blues scene. His music is featured on radio and web news outlets in various countries that cover the indie rock scene, demonstrating his active engagement not only in Japan but also overseas.

In 2025, Duran continued activities as part of a three–member rock band led by Duran, including members Masae (bass) and Shiho (drums), under his name.

== Discography ==
=== Albums ===
- Face (2018)
- Kaleido Garden (2021)
- Electric Man (2023)
- 30 Scratchy Backroad Blues (2024)
- Tokyo Blues (2024)
- Live from FEVER Board Tapes (2025)

=== Singles ===
- Ride 4 me (2019, digital)
- Black & White / The World Is A Gimmick (2019, venue-limited physical CD)
- Sampaguita (March 23, 2020)
- Echo (Electric Gospel) (June 29, 2020)
- No In Between (feat. Mars Daniel, Southeast!) (August 16, 2020)
- TWIAG_2 (feat. 906) (November 8, 2020)
- Phantasmagoria (December 22, 2020)
- Revive feat. Katsuma (coldrain) (August 25, 2021)
- No In Between (It's Time to Do or Die) (September 22, 2021)
- Leavin' It All Behind feat. 906 (October 20, 2021)
- Shades Of Night (June 15, 2022)
- Zankon (Devil Talkin' Blues) (July 12, 2022)
- Real Eyes (December 29, 2022, 7 inch vinyl)
- Moldy Chips (August 16, 2023)
- Jojo's Echo Blues (September 20, 2023)
- Sapient Creature (October 25, 2023)
- Beep Beep (February 26, 2025)

=== Other Recordings ===
- TRICK DISC (2008), album - 藤岡幹大 (Mikio Fujioka) of TRICK BOX
- GLORIA from the VISIONALUX (2015) - EXILE TAKAHIRO
- theme from K5(Kの異乗) (2015), EP - シシド・カフカ (Kavka Shishido)
- Beautiful Gorgeous Love / First Liners (2016), single - RED DIAMOND DOGS
- Calling Dr Love from KISS & MAKEUP (album) (2016) - シシド・カフカ (Kavka Shishido)
- YELLOW (2016), single - 稲葉浩志 (Koshi Inaba)
- Stand By Me (2017), single - RED DIAMOND DOGS
- Zutto Issho (ずっと一緒, 2017), single - JAY'ED
- Yoru, Carmen no Shishuu (夜、カルメンの詩集, 2018), album - 清春 (Kiyoharu)
- Suddenly / RED SOUL BLUE DRAGON (2018), single - RED DIAMOND DOGS
- Covers (2019), album - 清春 (Kiyoharu)
- Roudonannkashinaide Kougouseidakede Ikitai (労働なんかしないで光合成だけで生きたい, 2019), album - スガ シカオ (Suga Shikao)
- GOOD VIBES (2019), single - RED DIAMOND DOGS
- Piercing (2019), album - 小袋成彬 (Nariaki Obukuro)
- Okay (2020), single - collaboration with Yoshito Tanaka
- Hedemoneyo (へでもねーよ, 2020), single - 藤井風 (Fujii Kaze)
- Seishunbyou (青春病, 2020), single - 藤井風 (Fujii Kaze)
- JAPANESE MENU/DISTORTION 10 (2020), album - 清春 (Kiyoharu)
- Strides (2021), album - 小袋成彬 (Nariaki Obukuro)
- First of all (2022), album - RED DIAMOND DOGS
- the love letter feat. DURAN (2022) - 達瑯 (Tatsuro) produced by Ken
- Regret (リグレット, 2022), single - 清春 (Kiyoharu)
- Komazawa Kouen (駒沢公園, 2022) - 矢井田瞳 (Hitomi Yaida)
- Wine (ワイン, 2022) - adieu
- Ashes (2023), single - Superfly
- ETERNAL (2024), album - 清春 (Kiyoharu)
- Fujin (風神, 2024), single - Vaundy
- Somebody help us (2024), single - Vaundy
- Tadamono (只者, 2024), album - 稲葉浩志 (Koshi Inaba)
- Toumeini Naritai (透明になりたい, 2024), single - Number_i
- Cloudy (2024), single - King & Prince
- plum (2024), single - にしな (Nishina)
- Prema (2025), single - 藤井風 (Fujii Kaze)

== Stage ==
- Hedwig and the Angry Inch (musical) (August 31 till September 29, 2019, several venues), as part of the band "The angry inch".
- John Cameron Mitchell "Midnight Radio - The History of Hedwig" (July 19–21, 2025)
