= Land (Yuzu album) =

Studio album by Yuzu
- Released: May 1, 2013
- Genre: J-pop
- Length: 61:08
- Language: Japanese
- Label: Senha & Co.

Yuzu albums chronology
2-NI- (2011)	Land (2013)	Shinsekai (2014)

Singles from Land
- 1. "Love & Peach" Released: July 20, 2011; 2. "Sho" Released: November 30, 2011; 3. "With You" Released: May 23, 2012; 4. "See You Tomorrow" Released: August 8, 2012; 5. "Reason" Released: January 9, 2013; 6. "Black Bird" Released: January 30, 2013

Land is the eleventh studio album by Japanese pop rock duo Yuzu, released through Senha & Co on May 1, 2013 after 2011 Tōhoku earthquake. Some songs of the album encourage people to overcome the disaster. The album debuted at number one on both Oricon's and Billboard Japan's weekly album rankings, with 89,334 copies sold in its first week. It is certified Gold by the Recording Industry Association of Japan for sales of 100,000. Land was ranked number 33 on Billboard Japan's Top 100 Albums of 2013. It won the Japan Record Awards for Best Album in 2013.

== Singles ==
Yuzu released singles from Land for over a year, including "Love & Peach", "Sho", "With You", "See You Tomorrow", "Reason", and "Black Bird". The single "Reason" and another song of the album, "Nagareboshi Kirari" (流れ星キラリ Shooting Star), were used as ending themes for the 2011 anime Hunter × Hunter. "Reason" was ranked number two on the Billboard Japan Hot 100, and received a digital download song certification of Gold from the RIAJ for sales of 100,000.

== Track listing ==
No.	Title	Lyrics	Music	Length
1.	"Reason"	Yūjin Kitagawa; Kōji Iwasawa; Kenichi Maeyamada	Kitagawa; Iwasawa; Maeyamada	5:07
2.	"Land"	Kitagawa	Kitagawa	5:51
3.	"Black Bird" (イロトリドリ)	Kitagawa	Kitagawa; Jin	3:27
4.	"Merry-go-round in the Desert" (砂漠のメリーゴーランド)	Kitagawa	Kitagawa	3:44
5.	"With You"	Kitagawa	Kitagawa	5:30
6.	"Geranium" (ゼラニウム)	Kitagawa	Kitagawa	4:34
7.	"Interlude "Ohanashi""			1:16
8.	"Love & Peach"	Kitagawa	Kitagawa	4:20
9.	"Nagareboshi Kirari" (流れ星キラリ)	Kitagawa; Iwasawa	Kitagawa	5:03
10.	"See You Tomorrow" (また明日)	Iwasawa	Iwasawa	4:55
11.	"Sho" (翔)	Kitagawa	Kitagawa	5:40
12.	"Lantern" (灯影)	Iwasawa	Iwasawa	4:34
13.	"Moonlight Parade" (ムーンライトパレード)	Kitagawa	Kitagawa	4:18
Total length:				61:08

== Charts ==
=== Weekly charts ===
Chart (2013)	Peak position
Japanese Top Albums (Billboard)	1
Japanese Albums (Oricon)	1

=== Year-end charts ===
Chart (2013)	Peak position
Japanese Top Albums (Billboard)	33
Japanese Albums (Oricon)	32

== Certifications ==
Region	Certification	Certified units/sales
Japan (RIAJ)	Gold	100,000^{^}
^{^} Shipments figures based on certification alone.

== Awards ==
Year	Award	Category	Work/Nominee	Result
2013	55th Japan Record Awards	Best Album	Land	Won

Preceded by Love Place (Kana Nishino)	Japan Record Award for the Best Album; 2013	Succeeded by Trad (Mariya Takeuchi)
