= 55th Japan Record Awards =

2013 Japanese music awards ceremony

- Date: December 30, 2013
- Venue: New National Theater, Tokyo
- Country: Japan

Television/radio coverage
- Network: TBS

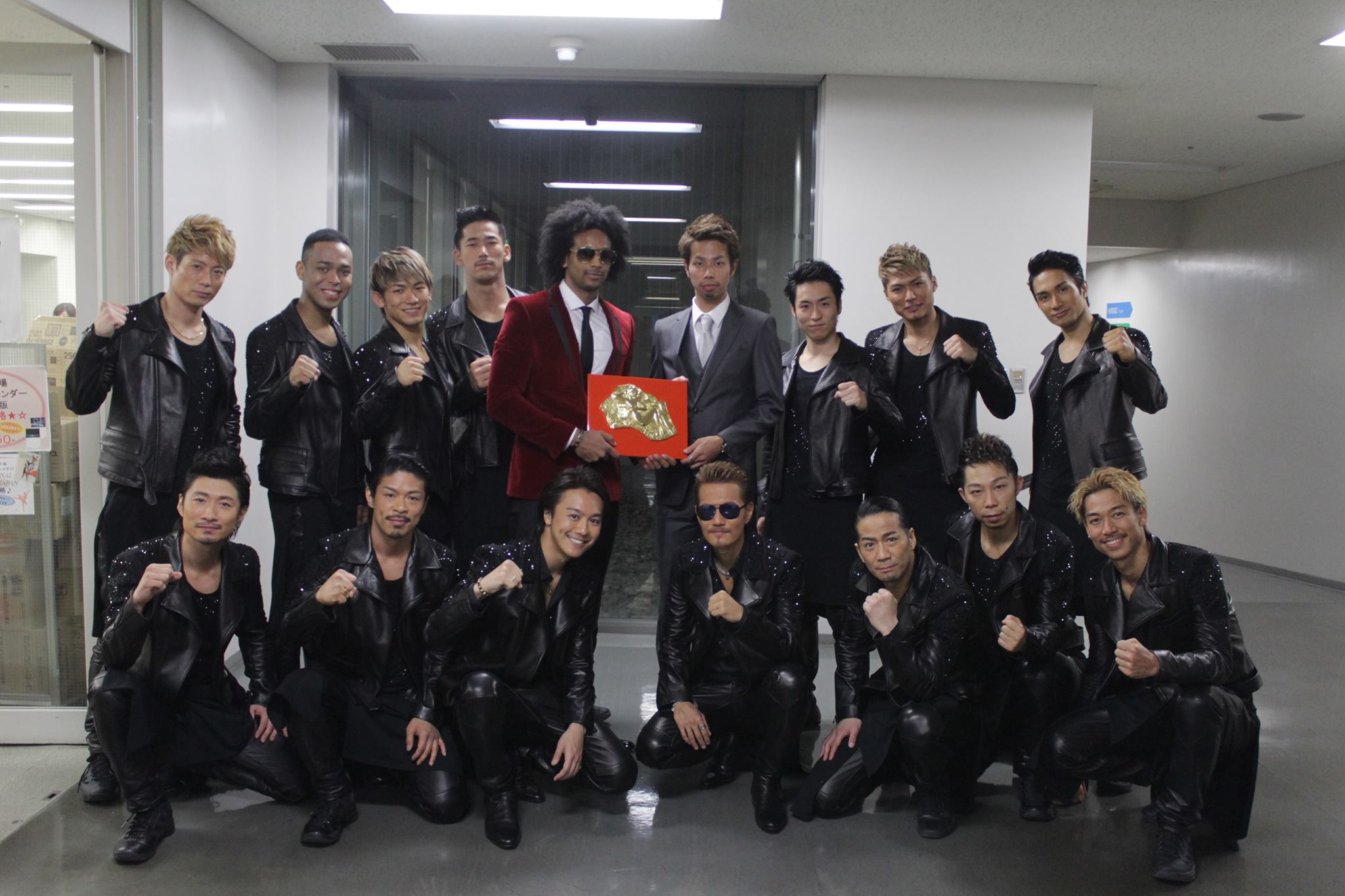
Phekoo with Exile Backstage at the 55th Japan Record Award Show

The 55th Japan Record Awards (第55回日本レコード大賞) took place at the New National Theater in Tokyo on December 30, 2013. The ceremony was televised in Japan on TBS.

== Presenters ==
- Shin'ichirō Azumi (TBS commentator)
- Aya Ueto
- Akiyo Yoshida (TBS commentator)
- Erina Masuda (TBS commentator)

Radio

- Kengo Komada (TBS commentator)

== Winners and winning works ==
=== Grand Prix ===
- "Exile Pride (Konna Sekai o Ai Suru Tame)" (EXILE PRIDE ～こんな世界を愛するため～) — Exile

=== Best Singer Award ===
- Miyako Ōtsuki (大月 みやこ)

=== Best New Artist Award ===
- Kōta Shinzato (新里 宏太)

=== Best Album Award ===
- Land — Yuzu

=== New Artist Award ===
The artists who are awarded the New Artist Award are nominated for the Best New Artist Award.

- Kōta Shinzato (新里 宏太)
- Kōhei Fukuda (福田 こうへい)
- Konomi Mori (杜 このみ)
- Juice=Juice
