= Phekoo =

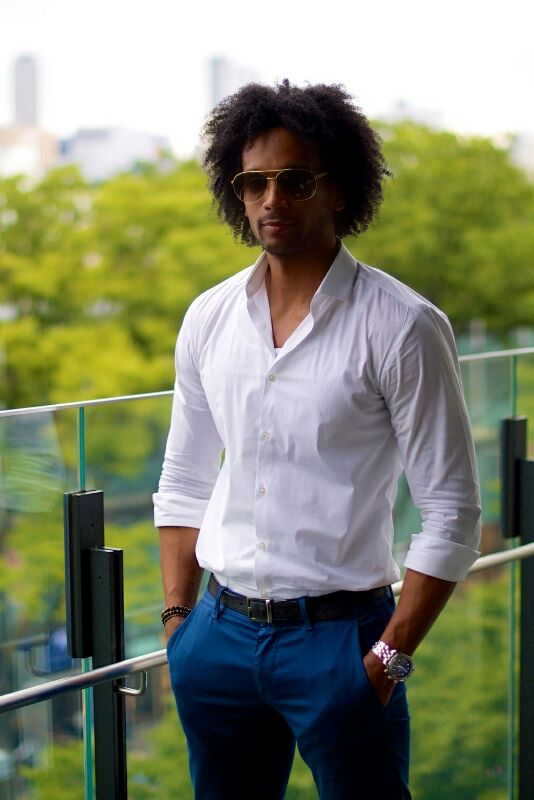
- Phekoo in Tokyo, Japan, 2014
- Born: Sean Phekoo; February 13, 1981 (age 45); Bronx, New York, U.S.
- Occupations: Composer; Record producer; Songwriter; Musician
- Years active: 2012–present
- Musical career
- Genres: Jpop; Pop; R&B; Hip hop; EDM
- Instruments: Drums, keyboard

Sean Phekoo (born February 13, 1981), known by his stage name/surname Phekoo (pronounced Fāy-Ko͞o, stylized as PHEKOO) is an American composer, musician and record producer. In 2013 Phekoo became the first foreigner ever to win the Japan Record Award Grand Prize (JRA) for "Song of the Year". Phekoo is a member of the band Red Diamond Dogs (RDD).

== Career ==
Phekoo is the composer for the multi-platinum single "Exile Pride" by male vocal-dance group Exile.

The official music video for Exile Pride won Video of the Year at the 2014 MTV Video Music Awards Japan.

Phekoo composed the song Angel Heart, from album Love Ballade, by male vocalist Exile Atsushi. On December 3, 2012 Love Ballade debuted at #1 on the Oricon charts. Angel Heart was the "theme song" for the Japanese Red Cross Society's "Cross Now!" campaign in 2014 and 2015.

Phekoo is a member of Japan-based pop band Red Diamond Dogs (RDD), featuring singer-songerwriter Exile Atsushi. In 2016, RDD made their debut on the "Exile Atsushi It's Showtime!!" Japan tour, performing 11 shows.

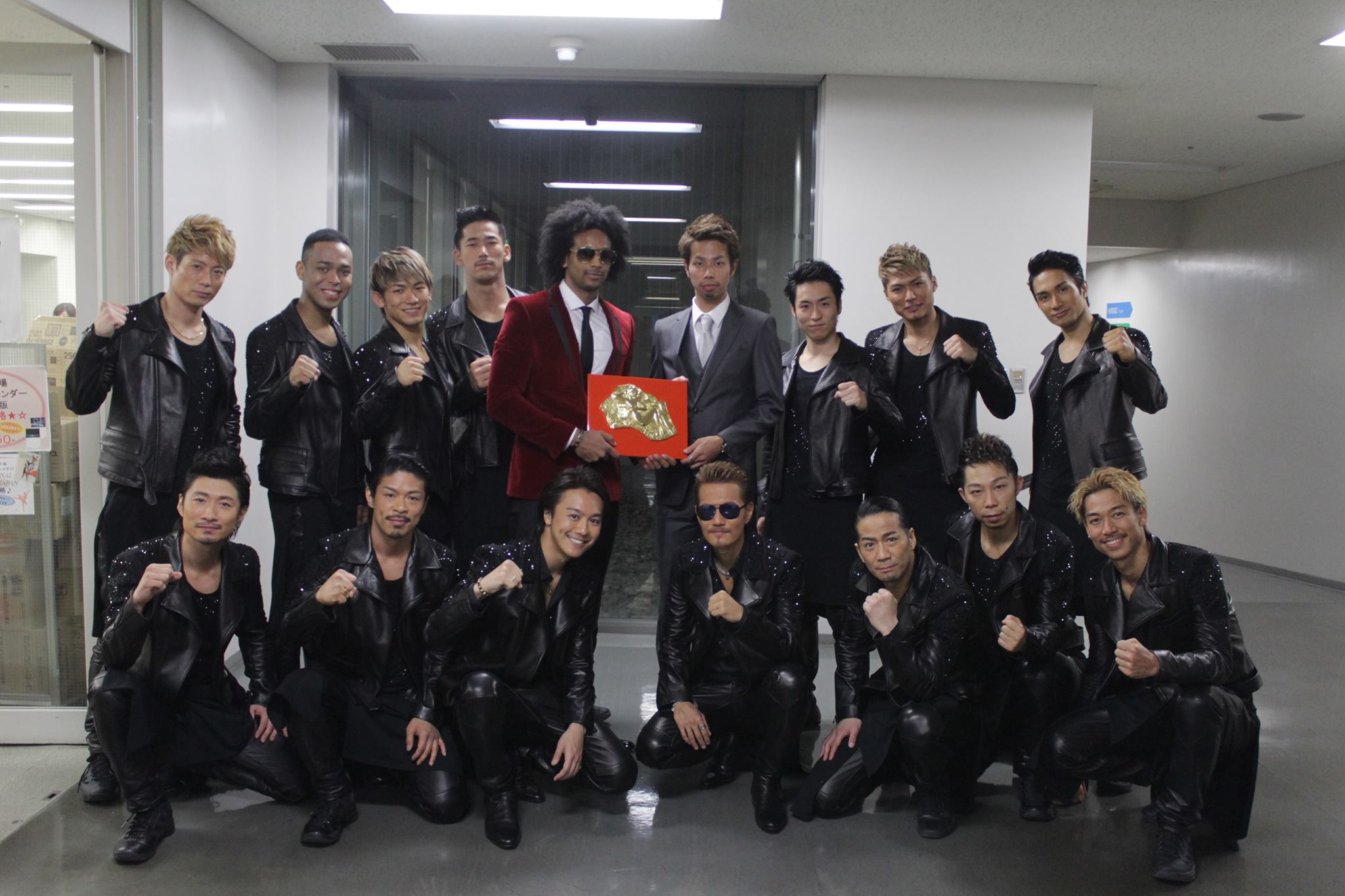
Phekoo with Exile Backstage at the 55th Japan Record Award Show, December 30, 2013

== Discography ==
=== Compositions ===
Title	Album details	Peak chart positions	Sales	Awards/Certifications
Exile Pride ~Konna Sekai wo Aisuru Tame~ (〜こんな世界を愛するため〜)	Artist: Exile; Album: (Single); Release date: 2013-04-03	1 (2x)	1,012,407	Japan Record Award
Angel Heart	Artsist: Exile Atsushi; Album: Love Ballade; Release date: 2014-12-03	1	100,000+	RIAJ: Gold

=== Singles ===
Title	Artist	Release date
Future Break Out	Red Diamond Dogs	July 6, 2016
First Liners	Red Diamond Dogs	July 6, 2016
Stand By Me	Red Diamond Dogs	February 15, 2017
Red Soul Blue Dragon	Red Diamond Dogs	July 11, 2018
Memory Rain	Red Diamond Dogs	July 11, 2018
Good Vibes	Red Diamond Dogs	September 4, 2019
