= Domo (album) =

2011 studio album by Kazumasa Oda

Domo (どーも) is the eighth original album by Kazumasa Oda, released on April 20, 2011.

Oda was 63 years old when he released this album; the album reached No. 1 on Oricon Album Chart, which made Kazumasa the oldest singer in Japanese chart history to achieve a No.1 album. The album was certified Platinum in Japan in July 2011.

== Track listing ==
All musics and lyrics are produced by Kazumasa Oda.

- Of you (君のこと)
- Goodbye (グッバイ)
- Wakaba no Hito (若葉のひと)
- hello hello
- Anyone can do anything (誰れも どんなことも)
- answer (こたえ)
- Gentle rain (やさしい雨)
- Don't say goodbye (さよならは 言わない)
- Somewhere today (今日も どこかで)
- Tokyo sky (東京の空)

Preceded by Hajimari no Uta (Ikimonogakari)	Japan Record Award for the Best Album; 2011	Succeeded by Love Place (Kana Nishino)
