= 54th Japan Record Awards =

2012 Japanese music awards ceremony

- Date: December 30, 2012
- Venue: New National Theater, Tokyo
- Country: Japan

Television/radio coverage
- Network: TBS

The 54th Japan Record Awards (第54回日本レコード大賞) took place at the New National Theater in Tokyo on December 30, 2012. The ceremony was televised in Japan on TBS.

== Presenters ==
- Shin'ichirō Azumi (TBS commentator)
- Yui Aragaki (actress)
- Erina Masuda (TBS commentator)
- Akiyo Yoshida (TBS commentator)

Radio

- Kengo Komada (TBS commentator)

== Winners and winning works ==
=== Grand Prix ===
- AKB48 — "Manatsu no Sounds Good!"

=== Best Singer Award ===
- Yoshimi Tendō

=== Best New Artist Award ===
- Leo Ieiri

=== Best Album Award ===
- Kana Nishino — Love Place

=== New Artist Award ===
The artists who are awarded the New Artist Award are nominated for the Best New Artist Award.

- Leo Ieiri
- Misaki Usuzawa
- Erena Ono
- Tīna Karīna

=== Composer Award ===
Raymond Matsuya - Dawn Blues (Singer: Hiroshi Itsuki)

=== Lyricist Award ===
Yasushi Akimoto - UZA, Gingham Check, Manatsu no Sounds Good!, etc. (Singer: AKB48)

=== Arranger Award ===
Yasutaka Nakata - Spice (Singer: Perfume), Tsukematsukeru (Singer: Kyary Pamyu Pamyu), etc.
