= Off Course =

Japanese folk rock band

- Origin: Yokohama, Kanagawa, Japan
- Genres: Pop rock, soft rock, folk rock, folk pop, baroque pop, chamber pop, new wave, yacht rock, sophisti-pop, city pop
- Years active: 1969–1989
- Labels: EMI Music Japan, Express
- Past members: Kazumasa Oda; Yasuhiro Suzuki; Hitoshi Shimizu; Kazuhiko Matsuo; Hitose Oma "Jiro"

Off Course was a Japanese folk rock band formed by Kazumasa Oda and Yasuhiro Suzuki. They broke up after a farewell performance at the Tokyo Dome on February 26, 1989.

Their most famous songs are "Sayonara" (さよなら), "YES-YES-YES", "Setsunakute"(せつなくて), "Love is Determination", and "Kaze ni Fukarete"（風に吹かれて）

== Members ==
- Kazumasa Oda (小田 和正): Vocals and Keyboards
- Yasuhiro Suzuki (鈴木 康博): Vocals and Guitars
- Hitoshi Shimizu (清水 仁): Vocals and Bass
- Kazuhiko Matsuo (松尾 一彦): Vocal, Guitar and Harmonica
- Hitose "Jiro" Oma (大間 "ジロー" 仁世): Drums and Percussion

== Discography ==
=== Albums ===
1. [1973.06.05] Off Course 1 / Boku no Okurimono (オフ・コース1 / 僕の贈りもの)
2. [1974.05.05] Kono Machi wo Yukeba / Off Course Round 2 (この道をゆけば / オフ・コース・ラウンド2)
3. [1975.12.20] Wine no Nioi (ワインの匂い)
4. [1976.11.05] Song is Love
5. [1977.09.05] Junktion
6. [1978.10.05] Fairway
7. [1979.10.20] Three and Two
8. [1980.11.21] We are
9. [1981.12.01] Over
10. [1982.07.01] I Love You
11. [1982.09.21] Next Sound Track
12. [1984.06.21] The Best Year of My Life
13. [1985.08.01] Back Streets of Tokyo
14. [1987.03.28] As Close as Possible
15. [1988.06.09] Still a long way to go

=== Singles ===
1. Gunshuu no Naka de / Hi wa Mata Noboru (April 5, 1970)
2. Yoake wo Tsuge ni / Utsukushii Sekai (October 5, 1971)
3. Osaraba / Kanashiki Akogare (April 25, 1972)
4. Boku no Okurimono / Meguriau Ima (February 20, 1973)
5. Mou Uta wo Tsukurenai / Hatachi no Koro (April 5, 1974)
6. Wasureyuki / Mizu Irazu no Gogo (October 20, 1974)
7. Nemurenu Yoru / Kinou e no Tegami (December 20, 1975)
8. Hitori de Ikiteyukereba / Aitsu no Nokoshita Mono wa (May 5, 1976)
9. Meguru Kisetsu / Runaway (October 5, 1976)
10. Kokoro wa Kimagure / Anata ga Ireba (February 5, 1977)
11. Aki no Kihai / Koibito yo Sono Mama de (August 5, 1977)
12. Rondo / Omoide wo Nusunde (November 20, 1977)
13. Yasashisa ni Sayonara / Toorisugita Yoru (April 5, 1978)
14. Anata no Subete / Umi wo Mitsumete (July 20, 1978)
15. Ai wo Tomenaide / Utsukushii Omoide ni (January 20, 1979)
16. Kaze ni Fukarete / Koi wo Dakishimeyou (June 5, 1979)
17. Sayonara / Shiokaze no Naka de (December 1, 1979)
18. Umarekuru Kodomotachi no Tameni / Kono Umi ni Chikatte (March 5, 1980)
19. Yes-No / Ai no Owaru Toki (June 21, 1980)
20. Toki ni Ai wa / Bokura no Jidai (December 1, 1980)
21. I LOVE YOU / Yoru wa Futari de (June 21, 1981)
22. Ai no Naka e / Christmas Day (December 1, 1981)
23. Kotoba ni Dekinai* / Kimi ni Okuru Uta (February 1, 1982)
24. YES-YES-YES / Main Street wo Tsuhare (June 10, 1982)
25. Kimi ga, Uso wo, Tsuita / Ai Yori mo (April 21, 1984)
26. Natsu no Hi* / Kimi no Shiawase wo Inorenai (July 18, 1984)
27. Midori no Hibi* / CITY NIGHTS (September 21, 1984)
28. Call / 2dome no Natsu (February 21, 1985)
29. Tasogare / LAST NIGHT (May 22, 1985)
30. Natsu Kara Natsu Made / Zenmai Jikake no Uso (September 21, 1985)
31. ENDLESS NIGHTS / EYES IN THE BACK OF MY HEART (November 30, 1985)
32. IT'S ALL RIGHT-ANYTHING FOR YOU / IT'S QUITE ALL RIGHT-INSTRUMENTAL- (March 4, 1986)
33. Motto Chikaku ni as close as possible / Tiny Pretty Girl (May 25, 1987)
34. Kimi Sumu Machi e / Kimi Sumu Machi e -INSTRUMENTAL- (January 25, 1988)
35. She's so wonderful / Hizashi no Naka de (July 25, 1988)
36. Natsu no Wakare / Aitai (October 25, 1989)

*Also in the anime series Sonic X.
