= Rootless (band) =

Japanese band

- Origin: Tokyo
- Genre: Alternative rock
- Years active: 2009 - 2015
- Labels: LDH (2009-2012); Being Inc. (2014-2015)
- Past members: Shin Nohata (vocals); Yūsuke Ōtsubo (drums); Takuya Ihara (bass); Duran (guitar)

Rootless, stylized as rootless, was a Japanese alternative rock band active from 2009 to 2015. They were affiliated with LDH and Being Inc.

== History ==
The band was formed in 2009 as The ROOTLESS performing in live houses and on the streets in the Tokyo area. On October 20, 2010, their single "One Day" was used as the opening theme for the anime One Piece. Earlier that year on August 8, "One Day" became available through music distributor RecoChoku, where it debuted at number three. The song also debuted at number three on Oricon's weekly ranking for the week of November 1.

On January 1, 2013, the band announced they were separating from their agent at LDH as well as their record label Rhythm Zone. They also announced at the same time that their bassist, Takuya Ihara, had left the band. On December 3, 2013, it was announced that their guitarist, Duran, had also left the band.

On January 10, 2014, they changed their name to Rootless. In the same year, they became affiliated with Being Inc. On December 28, 2015, the band announced their dissolution.

== Discography ==
=== Singles ===
Number	Release date	Titles	Ranking
Indie
1st	December 1, 2009	Rabu e (ラヴへ)	
Major Label
1st	October 20, 2010	One day	3
2nd	August 24, 2011	Kawaritai to, Tsuyoku Nozome. Sore Igai ha, Iranai (変わりたいと、強く望め。それ以外は、いらない)	83
Indies
	March 10, 2013	Black	
	March 10, 2013	White	

=== Mini albums ===
Number	Release date	Title	Ranking
Indie
1st	1 September 2009	Essence	

=== Album ===
Number	Release date	Title	Ranking
Major Label
1st - EP	September 28, 2011	The Rootless	52

== In media ==
Title	Media	Album
Kumo no Ue no Sekai ~ Byakuya ~ (雲の上の世界～白夜～)	Theme song for the movie Byakuya (白夜)	Essence
Kumo no Ue no Sekai ~ Byakuya ~ (雲の上の世界～白夜～)	Ending theme for Nippon TV's EXILE GENERATION	Essence
Rabu e (ラヴへ)	Theme song for BeeTV's drama Genryō Bokusā (減量ボクサー)	Single "Rabu e" (ラヴへ)
Kage (影)	Soundtrack for BeeTV's drama Genryō Bokusā (減量ボクサー)	Single "Rabu e" (ラヴへ)
One Day	Opening theme for Fuji Television's One Piece	Single "One day"
Kawaritai to, Tsuyoku Nozome. Sore Igai ha, Iranai (変わりたいと、強く望め。それ以外は、いらない)	Commercial song for the academic organization HAL (Tokyo, Osaka, Nagoya)	Single "Kawaritai to, Tsuyoku Nozome. Sore Igai ha, Iranai"
Yumemi-ka-Oka (夢見ヶ丘)	Commercial song for Meiji's Meiji Essel Super Cup ice cream	Single "Kawaritai to, Tsuyoku Nozome. Sore Igai ha, Iranai"
Road	Theme song for BeeTV's Megami no Itazura: Kimi ni Natta Boku (女神のイタズラ ～キミになったボク～)	The ROOTLESS
Erefanto (エレファント)	Theme song for BeeTV drama Sanmaime no Bodīgādo: Boku wa Kimi dake o Mamorinuku (3枚目のボディーガード ～ボクはキミだけを守りぬく～)	The ROOTLESS
STAND UP	Commercial song for Achilles's Shunsoku (瞬足) shoe line	The ROOTLESS
