= Yuzu (band) =

Japanese pop rock duo

Yuzu ゆず
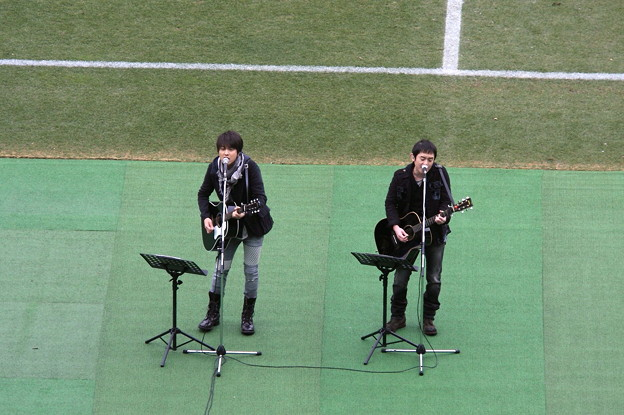
- Yuzu performing in 2012: Yūjin Kitagawa (left), and Kōji Iwasawa.

Background information
- Origin: Yokohama, Japan
- Genres: Pop rock; folk-pop
- Years active: 1996–present
- Labels: SENHA&Co; Toy's Factory
- Members: Yūjin Kitagawa; Kōji Iwasawa
- Website: yuzu-official.com

Yuzu (ゆず) is a Japanese pop rock duo who debuted in 1997. Its members are Yūjin Kitagawa (北川悠仁, Kitagawa Yūjin) and Kōji Iwasawa (岩沢厚治, Iwasawa Kōji). Both of the band members come from Yokohama in Kanagawa Prefecture, and attended Okamura Junior High School. Their songs "Hyōri Ittai" (表裏一体; "Two Sides of the Same Coin"), "Reason", and "Nagareboshi Kirari" (流れ星キラリ; "Shooting Star") were used as ending themes of the anime series Hunter × Hunter (2011).

Yuzu started out as street musicians. At first, the band's name was "Light's", but Kitagawa disliked it, so they changed the name to "Yuzu". At that time, Kitagawa was eating a yuzu sherbet, so he named the band after the fruit.

The fans of Yuzu are called "Yuzukko" (ゆずっ子), and the name of the official Yuzu fan club is "Yuzunowa" (ゆずの輪).

In 2004, their song "Bridge of Glory" (栄光の架橋) was used by NHK as the official theme song for the Olympic Games.

The story-driven ice show "Hyoen 2024 – The Miracle of the Cross Star" – starring Japanese figure skater, Olympic bronze medallist and former world champion Daisuke Takahashi – which was loosely based on the classic philosophical fantasy novel Night on the Galactic Railroad by Kenji Miyazawa, was entirely told through pre-existing Yuzu songs, which were rearranged by soundtrack composer Kenji Kawai. The band also wrote a theme song specifically for Hyoen, titled Jyujisei (engl.: Cross Star), which was subsequently released on the album Zukan (図鑑). They performed a short set at the end of each show.

In 2011, Yuzu were scheduled to perform in Tohoku, but their show was canceled due to the 2011 Tōhoku earthquake and tsunami. Two months later, they visited the devastated area and witnessed the power of music to help those in need. In 2026, after traveling to Fukushima Prefecture, they composed the song "Ikue" for NHK, aiming to remember the earthquake and encourage people to move forward. Marihiko Hara also collaborated on the song. In June, as part of the same project, Yuzu collaborated with figure skater and two-time Olympic champion Yuzuru Hanyu, who performed a new program to the music of "Ikue".

== Members ==
- Yūjin Kitagawa (born January 14, 1977) – vocals, guitar, leader
- Kōji Iwasawa (born October 14, 1976) – vocals, guitar

== Discography ==
Yuzu discography
- Studio albums: 19
- Live albums: 8
- Compilation albums: 5
- Singles: 46

=== Albums ===
==== Studio albums ====
List of studio albums, with selected chart positions
Title	Album details	Peak positions	Sales	Certifications
Title	Album details	JPN Oricon	Sales	Certifications
Yuzu Ikka (ゆず一家)	Released: July 23, 1998; Label: SENHA&Co; Formats: CD, digital download	6	JPN: 1,000,000+	RIAJ: Million
Yuzuen (ゆずえん)	Released: October 14, 1999; Label: SENHA&Co; Formats: CD, digital download	1	JPN: 1,200,000+	RIAJ: 3× Platinum
Tobira (トビラ, "Opening")	Released: November 1, 2000; Label: SENHA&Co; Formats: CD, digital download	1	JPN: 1,000,000+	RIAJ: Million
Yuzu Moa (ユズモア)	Released: March 6, 2002; Label: SENHA&Co; Formats: CD, digital download	2	JPN: 400,000+	RIAJ: Platinum
Sumire (すみれ)	Released: March 19, 2003; Label: SENHA&Co; Formats: CD, digital download	1	JPN: 250,000+	RIAJ: Platinum
1 〜One〜	Released: September 15, 2004; Label: SENHA&Co; Formats: CD, digital download	1	JPN: 250,000+	RIAJ: Platinum
Ribbon (リボン)	Released: January 18, 2006; Label: SENHA&Co; Formats: CD, digital download	1	JPN: 250,000+	RIAJ: Platinum
Wonderful World	Released: January 16, 2008; Label: SENHA&Co; Formats: CD, digital download	3	JPN: 100,000+	RIAJ: Gold
Furusato(故郷, "Hometown")	Released: October 7, 2009; Label: SENHA&Co; Formats: CD, digital download	1	JPN: 250,000+	RIAJ: Platinum
2-NI-	Released: February 16, 2011; Label: SENHA&Co; Formats: CD, digital download	1	JPN: 100,000+	RIAJ: Gold
Land	Released: May 1, 2013; Label: SENHA&Co; Formats: CD, digital download	1	JPN: 100,000+	RIAJ: Gold
Shinsekai (新世界, "New World")	Released: February 19, 2014; Label: SENHA&Co; Formats: CD, digital download	2	JPN: 250,000+	RIAJ: Platinum
Towa	Released: January 13, 2016; Label: SENHA&Co; Formats: CD, digital download	2	JPN: 100,000+	RIAJ: Gold
Big Yell	Released: April 4, 2018; Label: SENHA&Co; Formats: CD, digital download	2	JPN: 100,000+	RIAJ: Gold
Yuzutown	Released: March 4, 2020; Label: SENHA&Co; Formats: CD, digital download	2	JPN: 100,000+	RIAJ: Gold
People	Released: March 23, 2022; Label: SENHA&Co; Formats: CD, digital download	2	JPN: 35,125	
Sees	Released: June 29, 2022; Label: SENHA&Co; Formats: CD, digital download	4	JPN: 30,272	
Zukan (図鑑 "Illustration")	Released: July 31, 2024; Label: SENHA&Co; Formats: CD, digital download	3	JPN: 30,233	
Shinon (心音)	Released: March 11, 2026; Label: SENHA&Co; Formats: CD, digital download	3	JPN: 26,561	

==== Mini albums ====
List of mini albums, with selected chart positions
Title	Album details	Peak positions	Sales	Certifications
Title	Album details	JPN Oricon	Sales	Certifications
Yuzu no Moto (ゆずの素)	Released: October 25, 1997; July 14, 2010 (re-issue); Label: SENHA&Co; Formats: CD, digital download	8	—N/a	
Yuzuman (ゆずマン)	Released: February 21, 1998; Label: SENHA&Co; Formats: CD, digital download	29	JPN: 200,000+	RIAJ: Gold
Yuzuman no Natsu (ゆずマンの夏)	Released: July 12, 2000; Label: SENHA&Co; Formats: CD, digital download	1	JPN: 400,000+	RIAJ: Platinum
Yuzu Smile (ゆずスマイル)	Released: July 30, 2003; Label: SENHA&Co; Formats: CD, digital download	1	JPN: 100,000+	RIAJ: Gold

==== Live albums ====
List of live albums, with selected chart positions
Title	Album details	Peak positions	Sales	Certifications
Title	Album details	JPN Oricon	Sales	Certifications
Kajiki ~ Sakura Saku-hen~ (歌時記 〜サクラサク篇〜)	Released: June 23, 1999; Label: SENHA&Co; Format: CD	2	JPN: 200,000+	RIAJ: Gold
Kajiki: Futari no Biggu (Eggu) Shō-hen (歌時記～ふたりのビッグ（エッグ）ショー篇～)	Released: July 18, 2001; Label: SENHA&Co; Format: CD	3	JPN: 200,000+	RIAJ: Gold
Futari Sankaku 2015.8.15 〜 Midori no hi 〜 (二人参客 2015.8.15〜緑の日〜)	Released: September 9, 2015; Label: SENHA&Co; Format: CD	1	—N/a	
Futari Sankaku 2015.8.16 〜 Kiiro no hi 〜 (二人参客 2015.8.16〜黄色の日〜)	Released: September 9, 2015; Label: SENHA&Co; Format: CD	2	—N/a	
Ninin Sankyaku Yuzu Mega Mix	Released: September 30, 2015; Label: SENHA&Co; Format: LP	44	—N/a	
Yuzu Nomi 〜 Hakushu Kassai 〜 Higawari Zenkyoku-shū + 1 (ゆずのみ〜拍手喝祭〜 日替わり全曲集+1)	Released: August 8, 2019; Label: SENHA&Co; Format: CD	—	—N/a	
YUZU ARENA TOUR 2022 SEES -ALWAYS with you-	Released: September 17, 2022; Label: SENHA&Co; Format: Streaming/Digital Download	2	—N/a	
YUZU ARENA TOUR 2022 PEOPLE -ALWAYS with you-	Released: October 25, 2022; Label: SENHA&Co; Format: Streaming/Digital Download	1	—N/a	
"—" denotes items which did not chart.

==== Blu-ray / DVD discs ====
List of blu-ray disc / DVD disc
Title	Album details	Peak positions	
Title	Album details	JPN Oricon (DVD)	JPN Oricon (Blu-ray)
Yuzu Live Films "TOBIRA TOUR 2000 - 2001"	Released: May 16, 2001; Label: SENHA&Co; Format: DVD	7	—N/a
Futari no Big (egg) Show ~ 2-jikan 53-bu Tokyo Dome Kanzen Nōkatto-ban ~	Released: December 26, 2001; Label: SENHA&Co; Format: DVD	14	—N/a
Stadium Tour Man'in-on (raku) Rei ~ Nettō! Bomb odori	Released: January 23, 2002; Label: SENHA&Co; Format: DVD	9	—N/a
Live Flims Futari Akiaji	Released: January 23, 2002; Label: SENHA&Co; Format: DVD	—N/a	—N/a
Live Films Sumire	Released: October 22, 2003; Label: SENHA&Co; Format: DVD	5	—N/a
Live Films "1~ONE"	Released: June 4, 2005; Label: SENHA&Co; Format: DVD	3	—N/a
Live Films GO HOME	Released: November 16, 2005; Label: SENHA&Co; Format: DVD	6	—N/a
Yuzu no Ne	Released: February 6, 2008; Label: SENHA&Co; Format: DVD	1	—N/a
Live Films Wonderful World	Released: November 5, 2008; Label: SENHA&Co; Format: DVD	2	—N/a
Live Films Furusato	Released: July 14, 2010; Label: SENHA&Co; Format: DVD	3	—N/a
Live Films 2~NI	Released: November 30, 2011; Label: SENHA&Co; Format: DVD	2	—N/a
Yuzu You Dome DAY 1 Futari de, Domo Arigatō	Released: October 24, 2012; Label: SENHA&Co; Format: DVD + BD	1	6
Yuzu You Dome DAY 2 Minna, Domo Arigatō	Released: October 24, 2012; Label: SENHA&Co; Format: DVD + BD	2	5
Live Films Yuzu You Arena ~ Minna to, Doko Made mo	Released: June, 2013; Label: SENHA&Co; Format: DVD	—N/a	—N/a
Live Films GO LAND	Released: December 25, 2013; Label: SENHA&Co; Format: DVD + BD	5	13
Live Films Shin-Sekai	Released: November 26, 2014; Label: SENHA&Co; Format: DVD + BD	1	6
Live Films Towa ~ episode zero	Released: April 27, 2016; Label: SENHA&Co; Format: DVD + BD	3	7
Live Films Yuzu no Mi	Released: December 6, 2017; Label: SENHA&Co; Format: DVD + BD	5	5
Live Films Yuzu Iroha	Released: December 6, 2017; Label: SENHA&Co; Format: DVD + BD	2	3
Live Films BIG YELL	Released: December 19, 2018; Label: SENHA&Co; Format: DVD + BD	4	10
Live Films Yuzu no Mi ~ Hakushu Kassai ~	Released: January 15, 2020; Label: SENHA&Co; Format: DVD + BD	4	6
Yuzu All Time Best Live Again 1997 - 2007	Released: September 16, 2020; Label: SENHA&Co; Format: DVD + BD	2	3
Yuzu All Time Best Live Again 2008 - 2020	Released: September 16, 2020; Label: SENHA&Co; Format: DVD + BD	1	2
Live Films YUZU ONLINE TOUR 2020 AGAIN	Released: January 27, 2021; Label: SENHA&Co; Format: DVD + BD	—N/a	—N/a
Live Films Ni Ninjin Kyaku	Released: August 25, 2021; Label: SENHA&Co; Format: DVD + BD	—N/a	—N/a
Live Films Utao 2021	Released: November 24, 2021; Label: SENHA&Co; Format: DVD + BD	—N/a	—N/a
Live Films Yuzutown / Always Yuzutown	Released: December 21, 2021; Label: SENHA&Co; Format: DVD + BD	5	12
Live Films PEOPLE ~ always with you	Released: March 15, 2022; Label: SENHA&Co; Format: DVD + BD	3	5
Live Films SEES ~ always with you	Released: March 15, 2022; Label: SENHA&Co; Format: DVD + BD	4	9
Live Films Hibiki Day 1 Blue x Futari	Released: April 17, 2024; Label: SENHA&Co; Format: DVD + BD	3	6
Live Films Hibiki Day 2 Red x All Stars	Released: April 17, 2024; Label: SENHA&Co; Format: DVD + BD	2	5
Hibiki Complete Box	Released: April 17, 2024; Label: SENHA&Co; Format: DVD + BD	—N/a	—N/a
Live Films Again Again	Released: June 25, 2025; Label: SENHA&Co; Format: DVD + BD	—N/a	—N/a
Live Films Yuzu Misoka	Released: June 25, 2025; Label: SENHA&Co; Format: DVD + BD	—N/a	—N/a
Live Films Zukan	Released: February 25, 2026; Label: SENHA&Co; Format: DVD + BD		

==== Compilation albums ====
List of compilation albums, with selected chart positions
Title	Album details	Peak positions	Sales	Certifications
Title	Album details	JPN Oricon	Sales	Certifications
Home [1997–2000]	Released: June 8, 2005; Label: SENHA&Co; Format: CD	1	JPN: 500,000+	RIAJ: 2× Platinum
Going [2001–2005]	Released: June 8, 2005; Label: SENHA&Co; Format: CD	2	JPN: 500,000+	RIAJ: 2× Platinum
Yuzu no Ne [1997–2007] (ゆずのね1997–2007)	Released: October 3, 2007; Label: SENHA&Co; Format: CD	2	JPN: 100,000+	RIAJ: Gold
Yuzu You [2006–2011]	Released: April 25, 2012; Label: SENHA&Co; Format: CD	1	JPN: 250,000+	RIAJ: Platinum
Yuzu Iroha [1997–2017] (ゆずイロハ1997–2017)	Released: April 26, 2017; Label: SENHA&Co; Format: CD	1	JPN: 250,000+	RIAJ: Platinum

=== Singles ===
==== As lead artist ====
- "—" denotes releases that did not chart or were not released in that region.
- "×" denotes periods where charts did not exist or were not archived.

List of singles, with selected chart positions
Title	Year	Peak chart positions		Sales	Certifications	Album
Title	Year	JPN Oricon	JPN Billboard	Sales	Certifications	Album
"Summer Color" (夏色)	1998	17	×	JPN: 200,000+	RIAJ: Gold; RIAJ: Platinum (Note: Certification for streaming)	Yuzu Ikka
"Boy" (少年)	1998	10	×	—N/a		Yuzu Ikka
"Empty" (からっぽ)	1998	4	×	JPN: 200,000+	RIAJ: Gold	Yuzuen
"Someday" (いつか)	1999	4	×	JPN: 400,000+	RIAJ: Platinum	Yuzuen
"Goodbye Bus" (サヨナラバス)	1999	4	×	JPN: 200,000+	RIAJ: Gold	Yuzuen
"Sentimental" (センチメンタル)	1999	3	×	JPN: 200,000+	RIAJ: Gold	Yuzuen
"Friend's Song" (友達の唄)	1999	2	×	JPN: 200,000+	RIAJ: Gold	Yuzuen
"Outta Mind / Garbage Star" (心のままに/くず星)	1999	2	×	—N/a		Tobira
"Ah, The Days of Youth" (嗚呼、青春の日々)	2000	1	×	JPN: 400,000+	RIAJ: Platinum	Tobira
"Flightless Bird" (飛べない鳥)	2000	1	×	JPN: 200,000+	RIAJ: Gold	Tobira
"3 Count" (3カウント)	2001	2	×	JPN: 200,000+	RIAJ: Gold	Yuzu Moa
"Again 2" (アゲイン2)	2002	1	×	JPN: 200,000+	RIAJ: Gold	Yuzu Moa
"Songs of Love" (恋の歌謡日)	2002	3	×	JPN: 200,000+	RIAJ: Gold	Yuzu Iroha [1997–2017]
"Until We Meet Again" (またあえる日まで)	2002	2	×	JPN: 200,000+	RIAJ: Gold	Sumire
"Blue" (青)	2003	4	×	JPN: 100,000+	RIAJ: Gold	Sumire
"Breathing" (呼吸)	2003	5	×	JPN: 100,000+	RIAJ: Gold	Sumire
"3 Lines / Horizontal Line" (3番線/水平線)	2003	5	×	JPN: 100,000+	RIAJ: Gold	Sumire
"Violet" (スミレ)	2003	4	×	JPN: 100,000+	RIAJ: Gold	Sumire
"Priority to Pedestrians / Dark" (歩行者優先/濃)	2003	1	×	JPN: 200,000+	RIAJ: Gold	1 〜One〜
"Sakuragichō / Hobby's Width / Map of Dreams" (桜木町/シュミのハバ/夢の地図)	2004	3	×	JPN: 100,000+	RIAJ: Gold	1 〜One〜
"Bridge of Glory" (栄光の架橋)	2004	2	×	JPN: 250,000+	RIAJ: Platinum; RIAJ: Platinum (Note: Certification for streaming)	1 〜One〜
"We Are F. Marinos" (ウィーアー エフ・マリノス)	2005	x	x	—N/a		Non-album single
"Super Express / The Sun Will Rise Again" (超特急/陽はまた昇る)	2005	2	×	JPN: 100,000+	RIAJ: Gold	Ribbon
"Spring Breeze" (春風)	2007	3	×	—N/a		Wonderful World
"Story" (ストーリー)	2008	2	3	JPN: 100,000+	RIAJ: Gold	Wonderful World
"Yesterday and Tomorrow"	2008	4	4	—N/a		Furusato
"Shish Kebab" (シシカバブー)	2008	2	2	—N/a		Furusato
"I Wanna See You" (逢いたい)	2009	3	1	JPN: 100,000+	RIAJ: Gold	Furusato
"Strawberry" (いちご)	2009	2	2	—N/a		Furusato
"Rainbow" (虹)	2009	2	1	—N/a		Furusato
"Cherry Blossom Encounter / My Life" (桜会/マイライフ)	2010	2	2	—N/a		2-NI-
"Journey to Love" (慈愛への旅路)	2010	5	4	—N/a		2-NI-
"From"	2010	2	2	—N/a		2-NI-
"Hey-Peace" (Hey和)	2011	3	18	—N/a		2-NI-
"Fly" (翔)	2011	5	3	—N/a		Land
"With You"	2012	5	3	—N/a		Land
"See Ya Tomorrow" (また明日)	2012	7	5	—N/a		Land
"Reason"	2013	3	2	—N/a		Land
"Friend: Time of Departure" (友 ～旅立ちの時～)	2013	5	3	—N/a		Shinsekai
"The Rain Will Turn to Hallelujah / I Want to Protect You" (雨のち晴レルヤ/守ってあげたい)	2013	3	2	—N/a		Shinsekai
"Hyori Ittai" (表裏一体)	2013	4	2	—N/a		Shinsekai
"Charm" (ヒカレ)	2014	8	3	—N/a		Shinsekai
"OLA!!"	2015	6	—	—N/a		Towa
"Owaranaiuta" (終わらない歌)	2015	5	—	—N/a		Towa
"Muscat" (マスカット)	2018	10	—	—N/a		Non-album singles
"Get Back"	2025	—	—	—N/a		Non-album singles
"Ikue" (幾重)	2026	—	92	—N/a		Shin-On

==== Collaboration singles ====
Release date	Title	Japanese	Artists
November 29, 2006	"Christmas no Yakusoku"	クリスマスの約束	Yuzuoda (Yuzu, Kazumasa Oda)
May 23, 2007	"Original Soundtrack Single Eiga 「Syaberedomo Syaberedomo」"	Original Soundtrack Single 映画「しゃべれども しゃべれども」	
July 11, 2007	"Music"	ミュージック	Golden Circle feat. Yohito Teraoka/Yumi Matsutoya/Yuzu
May 13, 2009	"Two You"	two友	Yuzuguren (Yuzu, Kimaguren)

== Asia Tours ==
- YUZU ASIA TOUR 2016 Summer 「NATSUIRO」 supported by WAKUWAKU JAPAN (2016)
- YUZU ASIA TOUR 2017 (2017)
- YUZU ASIA LIVE 2019 (2019)

== Awards ==
Japan Record Awards

The Japan Record Awards is a major music awards show held annually in Japan by the Japan Composer's Association.

Year	Nominee / work	Award	Result
2013	Land	Best Album Award	Won
2017	Yuzu	Special Award	Won

Space Shower Music Video Awards

Year	Nominee / work	Award	Result
1998	Natsuiro (夏色)	Best Your Choice	Won
1999	Sentimental (センチメンタル)	Best Your Choice	Won
2000	Tobenai Tori (飛べない鳥)	Best Your Choice	Won
2014	Yuzu	Best Artist	Won
2016	Owaranai Uta (終わらない歌)	Best Video of the Year	Won
2018	Yuzu	Artist of the Year	Won
