= Kazumasa Oda =

Japanese singer-songwriter (born 1947)

Kazumasa Oda 小田 和正
- Born: September 20, 1947 (age 78)
- Origin: Kanazawa-ku, Yokohama, Japan
- Genres: Folk rock adult contemporary
- Occupations: Singer-songwriter, singer, composer
- Years active: 1970–present
- Labels: Funhouse, BMG Japan, Ariola Japan/Little Tokyo
- Formerly of: Off Course
- Website: fareastcafe.co.jp

Kazumasa Oda (小田 和正, Oda Kazumasa; born September 20, 1947) is a Japanese singer-songwriter, and composer. He was the leader of folk rock band Off Course from 1969 to 1989, and has done solo work since 1985.

As the vocalist of Off Course, Oda wrote many Japanese standard numbers in the 1970s and 1980s. The group's most successful singles—"Sayonara" (1979), "Yes-No" (1980), and "Kimi ga Uso o Tsuita" (1984)—were written by Oda.

In 1985 he began work as a solo musician. He produced many hit singles as singer-songwriter, such as "Little Tokyo" (1989), "Itsuka Dokokade" (1992), "Tsutaetai Koto ga Arunda" (1997) and "Kirakira" (2002). His most successful single was "Love Story wa Totsuzen ni" (1991), the theme song of a Japanese TV drama called Tokyo Love Story. It sold over 2,580,000 copies and became the ninth best-selling single in Japan.

== Musical career ==
=== Off Course ===
Kazumasa Oda and Yasuhiro Suzuki began performing together in 1964 while the two were in Seiko Gakuin Junior High School. In 1969, they formed the band The Off Course, which they later renamed to Off Course. The pair worked as a duo for their first six albums. Oda primarily played keyboards and Suzuki played guitars, with the two sharing songwriting and vocals.

For their seventh album, in 1979, Off Course added three new permanent members and moved to more of a pop/rock sound. Oda and Suzuki continued to provide the vast majority of the songwriting and lead vocals. After five albums as a five-man band, Suzuki left the group in 1982 to pursue a solo career. The remaining members continued on for four more albums. Off Course officially came to an end after their final concert on February 26, 1989.

=== Solo career ===
In 1985, Oda collaborated with Yumi Matsutoya and Kazuo Zaitsu and released the No. 1 hit single "Imadakara". It was mostly written by Matsutoya and Oda, and played by the former Sadistic Mika Band members. In the same year, Oda began his own solo career. His first solo album K.Oda (1986) was produced by Oda and Grammy Award-winning recording engineer Bill Schnee, who was known for his work with Steely Dan, Olivia Newton-John, Boz Scaggs, Pablo Cruise, and Huey Lewis and the News. Schnee was one of Oda's friends, and had also worked on the Off Course albums. Oda's solo debut album was recorded by many influential musicians; Jeff Porcaro on drums, David Hungate on bass, Dann Huff on guitar and others.

Three years later from release of K.Oda, he released self-produced studio album Between the Word and Heart. Around that year, the work as Off Course was getting destroyed. He released third studio album Far East Cafe in 1989. In this album, Nathan East performed bass guitar, but other instruments and chorus were mainly recorded by several Japanese musicians. The title of the album was also his management office name. In later year, he has run same-titled café.

In 1991, he wrote the theme song for Tokyo Love Story, the drama series which was broadcast by Fuji Television. At first, he wrote the song called "Far East Club Band Song", but the producer Akira Ota refused that song and ordered Oda to write another song. Eventually, "Far East Club Band Song" was featured as theme song on another program, and instead of "Far East", he wrote "Love Story wa Totsuzen ni". On February 6 of same year, it was released as the double A-side single with "Oh! Yeah!" (It was used as the background music on TV advertisement of The Dai-ichi Mutual Life Insurance Company.) The single sold nearly 2,600,000 copies and became best-selling compact disc in Japan at that time. At the stage now, it is ninth best-selling singles in Japan. Because of these succeeded tie-up, a lot of his songs were used as theme songs for advertisements, movies, and TV dramas in later years. After the hit of "Oh! Yeah!", Oda released same-titled first compilation album. Following the success of the single, this album sold over 1.5 million copies.

In the 21st century, he released three albums and all of them reached number one on the official Japanese music chart, Oricon. Above all, compilation album Jiko Best (2002) sold over 2,200,000 copies. With the release of his album Soukana in 2005, he became the oldest solo music artist to reach number one on Oricon's album chart. His 2007 single "Kokoro" also made him the oldest solo music artist to reach number one on Oricon's single's chart. (This record has since been surpassed by Junko Akimoto, in 2009).

In 2018 he released a single which included the song "Kono michi o", theme song for TBS drama Black Pean. Oda returns with "Sono saki ni aru mono", theme song for season 2 (2024).

== Discography ==
=== Studio albums ===
- K.Oda (1986)
- Between the Word and the Heart (1988)
- Far East Café (1990)
- Sometime Somewhere (1992)
- My Home Town (1993)
- Looking Back (1996)
- Kojin Shugi (個人主義; "Individualism") (2000)
- Looking Back 2 (2001)
- Soukana (そうかな) (2005)
- Domo (どーも) (2011)
- Oda Biyori (小田日和) (2014)
- Early Summer 2022 (2022)

=== Compilation albums ===
- Oh! Yeah! (1991)
- Tsutaetai Koto ga Arunda (伝えたいことがあるんだ) (1997)
- Jiko Best (自己ベスト) (2002)
- Jiko Best 2 (自己ベスト-2) (2007)
- Ano Hi Ano Toki (あの日 あの時, That Day, That Time) (2016)

== Awards and nominations ==
=== Japan Record Awards ===
The Japan Record Awards is a major music awards show held annually in Japan by the Japan Composer's Association.

Year	Nominee / work	Award	Result
2011	Dōmo	Best Album Award	

=== The Television Drama Academy Awards ===
Year	Nominee / work	Award	Result
1997	I have something to tell(伝えたいことがあるんだ)	Best Theme song Award	Won
