= Jimsaku =

Japanese jazz duo

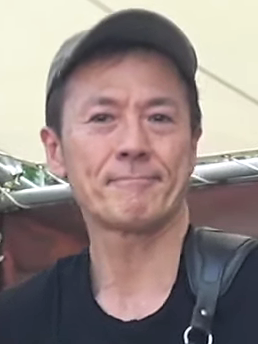
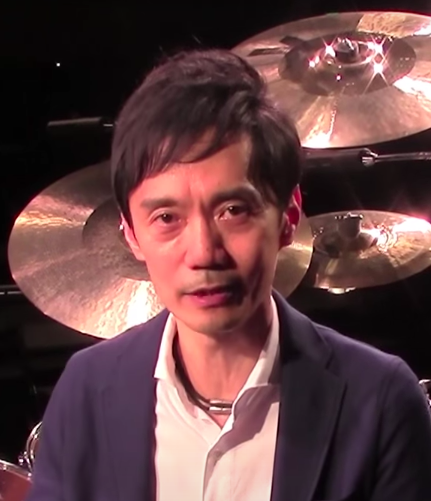
- Tetsuo Sakurai (left, 2019) and Akira Jimbo (right, 2015)

Background information
- Origin: Japan
- Genres: Jazz, fusion, rock
- Years active: 1990–1998; 2019; 2020–present
- Members: Akira Jimbo; Tetsuo Sakurai

Jimsaku (ジンサク, Jinsaku) is a Japanese drum and bass duo formed by Akira Jimbo and Tetsuo Sakurai in 1990, after they left the jazz/fusion band Casiopea. They released 10 albums and one "Best of" collection, and disbanded in 1998. The name is a portmanteau of the two band members' last names, Jimbo and Sakurai.

== Founding and Early Jimsaku ==
In 1989, Sakurai and Jimbo formed a band with members other than Casiopea, Shambara. Issei Noro called for Shambara to be disbanded, Sakurai and Jimbo refused and quit Casiopea, dissolving the original Casiopea. The two formed Jimsaku after this, wanting to be in an instrumental band again. Shambara fell apart, after Sakurai and Jimbo focused on Jimsaku instead.

Jimsaku's early discography was heavily influenced by Latin / Samba music after Sakurai's trip to Brazil in the early 80s influenced his style of music. Although this kind of music was different from main-stream fusion, Jimsaku remained popular. Jimsaku stuck to a two album annual release schedule, which put a strain on the quality of Jimsaku's compositions, forcing the two away from Latin music by the mid 90s. To try to fix this issue, any and all support members of the group were removed, leaving just Sakurai and Jimbo. They instead invited singular artists to play with them on select tracks.

== Late Jimsaku and Disbandment ==
Jimsaku has been featured on the "Mint Sessions" in 1997, a show where Sakurai and Jimbo talked with guests like the Members of Casiopea Second about the founding and early years of the original Casiopea.

Both of them played at the Casiopea 20th Anniversary Concert as "Support Drums" and "Support Bass".

Around this time, live performances shifted, after the support members left, concerts became just Sakurai and Jimbo on stage. With albums like "MEGA db", the band became very drum & bass heavy. in February 1998, Sakurai and Jimbo played a concert together not under the name Jimsaku, and announced the disbandment.

== Post Breakup, Reunion, Katsushika Trio ==
The two focused on their solo work, Jimbo focused on his "One Man Orchestra", and played with Casiopea Second as "Support Drums". Sakurai did a domestic tour with Issei Noro, as an acoustic duo, Pegasus. It took until Akira Jimbo's 60th birthday to see the two perform under the name Jimsaku again.

Jimsaku has been signed to four record labels over its history: Polydor, BMG, Fun House, and King Records, under which they regrouped for their 30th anniversary, and in 2021 recorded a new album.

After Jimsaku's 30th anniversary, and their new album, the band started playing shows with fellow ex-Casiopea member, Minoru Mukaiya, who was not allowed back into the group after Casiopea's reunion in 2012. The three formed Katsushika Trio in 2022, which at first was dedicated to playing Casiopea songs from the 80s, but has released 4 singles, an EP, and 2 LPs.

== Discography ==
=== Albums ===
- Jimsaku (1990)
- 45°C (1991)
- Jade (1992)
- Wind Loves Us (1993)
- Navel (1994)
- Blaze of Passion (1995)
- Dispensation (1996)
- Mega db (1997)
- Jimsaku Beyond (2021)

=== Live albums ===
- Viva! (1992)
- 100% (1993)

=== Compilations ===
- Best Selection (1995)
