= DTX =

DTX may refer to:

== Arts and entertainment ==
- DTX (drum set), electronic percussion kits by Yamaha
- DTX (TV channel), of Discovery Networks (2015–2024)
- Delta Tau Chi, a fictional fraternity in 1978 film Animal House

== Government ==
- State Security Service (Azerbaijan) (Azerbaijani: Dövlət Təhlükəsizlik Xidməti)

== Places in the United States ==
- Dallas, Texas
- Downtown Crossing (MBTA station), Boston, Massachusetts
- Downtown Rail Extension, San Francisco, California
- McKinney National Airport, which has been assigned the IATA airport code of DTX

== Science and technology ==
- DTX (form factor), a personal computer size
- Dendrotoxin, in mamba venom
- Discontinuous Transmission, in mobile communications
- Yamaha DTX series, electronic percussion kits
- Docetaxel, in chemotherapy
- .dtx, documented LaTeX files for DocStrip
