= Yamaha Rock Tour Custom =

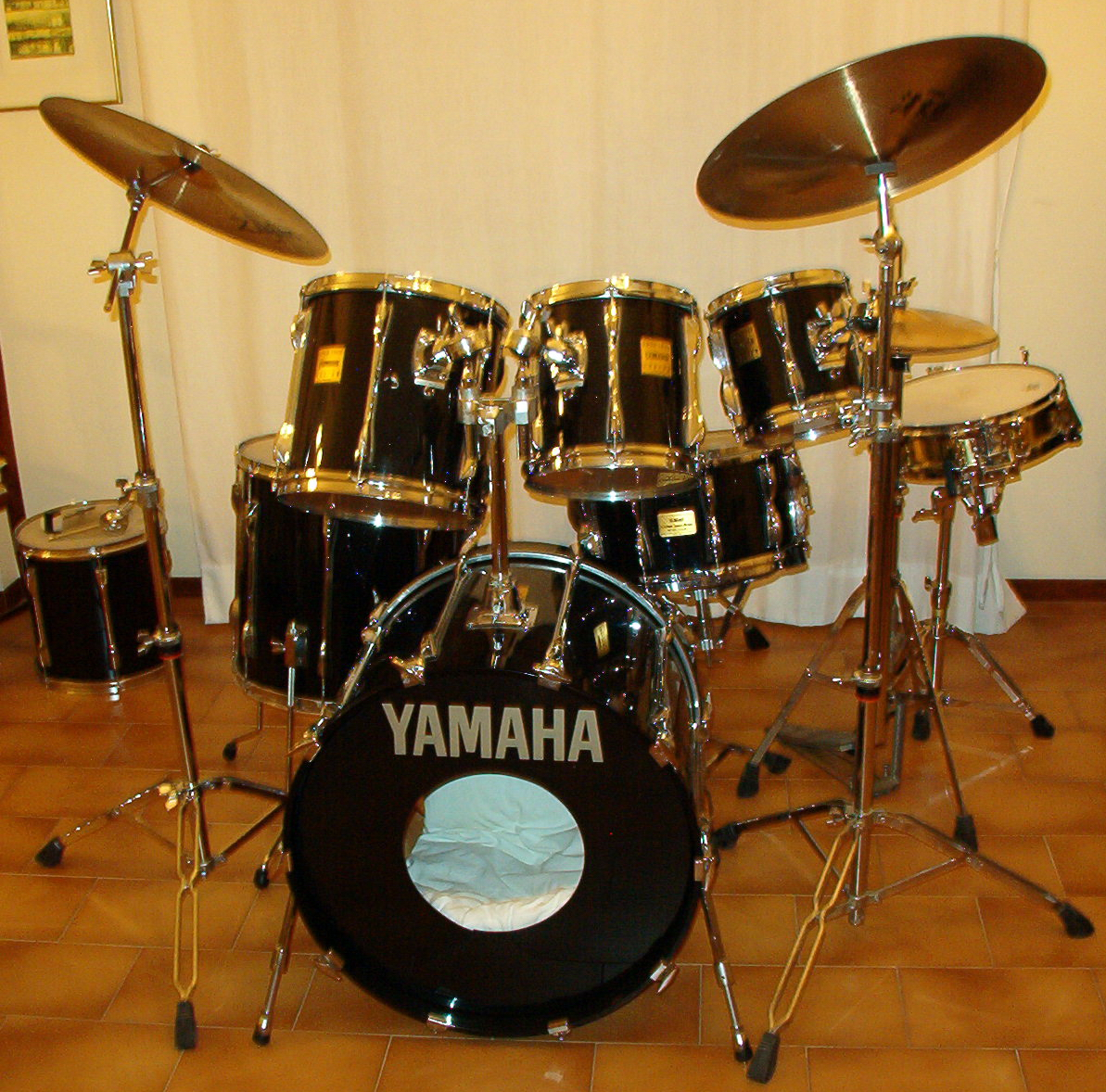
Yamaha Rock Tour Custom

The Yamaha Rock Tour Custom was a professional line of drums first manufactured by Yamaha Drums in 1990. They were built at their factories in Japan and England.

The range was fairly short lived with production stopping in 1998. They should not be confused with the lower quality "Rock Tour" range produced in 2010.

The shells were constructed of Birch and Philippine Mahogany and were then wrapped in a "tough resin sheath" to give an "aggressive driving sound".

Bass drums and floor toms were constructed of 11 ply shells. Tom toms and the RTC snare drum were 8 ply shells. Bearing edges were single 45 degree, and Yamaha's high tension lugs were used across the range.

The drums were available in power sizes and turbo sizes as was the fashion of the time.

== Rock Tour Custom Components ==
=== Power Size Model Numbers (dimensions in brackets) ===
| Tom Toms | Floor Toms | Bass Drums |
|---|---|---|
| RTT-808 (8x8); RTT-810 (10x10); RTT-812 (12x10); RTT-813 (13x11); RTT-814 (14x12); RTT-815 (15x13); RTT-816 (16x14) | RFT-816 (16x16); RFT-818 (18x16) | RBD-822 (22x16); RBD-824 (24x16) |

=== Turbo Size Model Numbers (dimensions in brackets) ===
| Tom Toms | Bass Drums |
|---|---|
| RTT-812T (12x12); RTT-813T (13x13); RTT-814T (14x14) | RBD-822T (22x18); RBD-824T (24x18); RBD-826T (26x18) |

=== Snare Drums ===
Snare Drum

RSD-086 (14x6.5)
RSD-088 (14x8)

== Notable Endorsers ==
Gary Husband
Manu Katché
Matt Sorum
Tommy Aldridge
Nick Menza
Cozy Powell
Akira Jimbo
Eric Kretz
Mike Bordin

== Finishes Offered ==
Solid Black
Hot red
Stage White
Mellow Yellow
Cobalt Blue
Black Sparkle

== Gallery ==
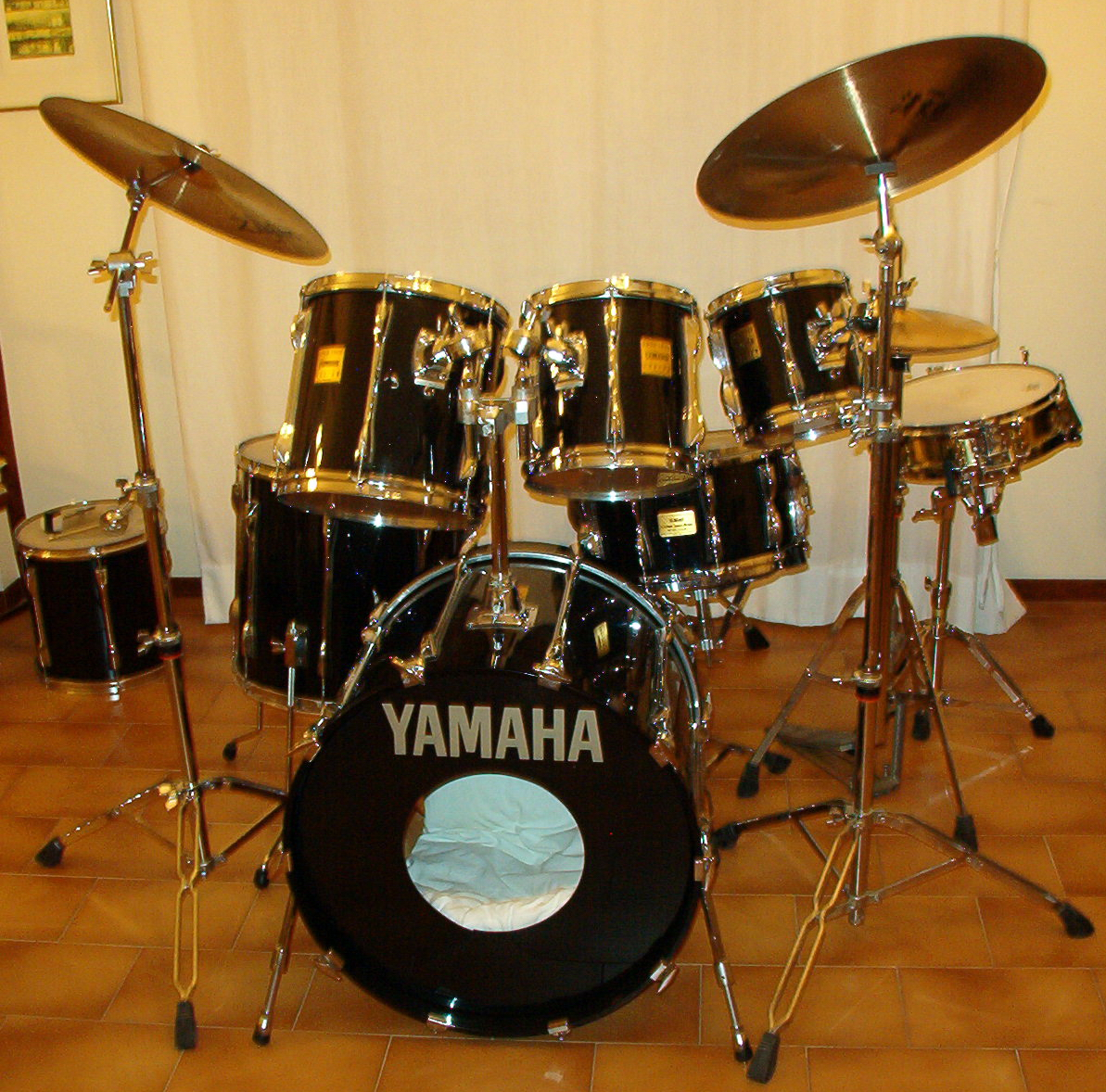
Rock Tour Custom Set Up in Black Sparkle.

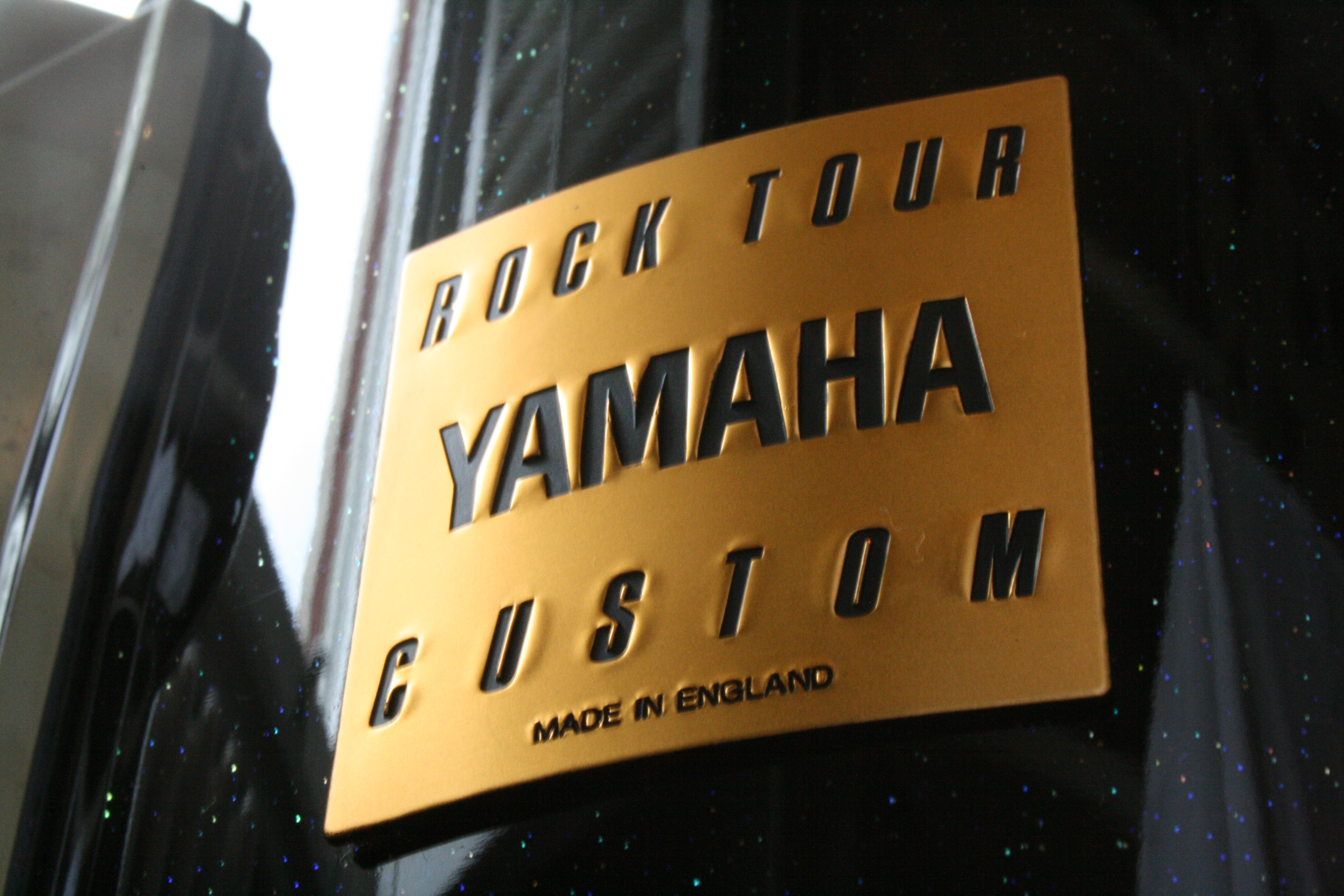
Rock Tour Custom Badge.

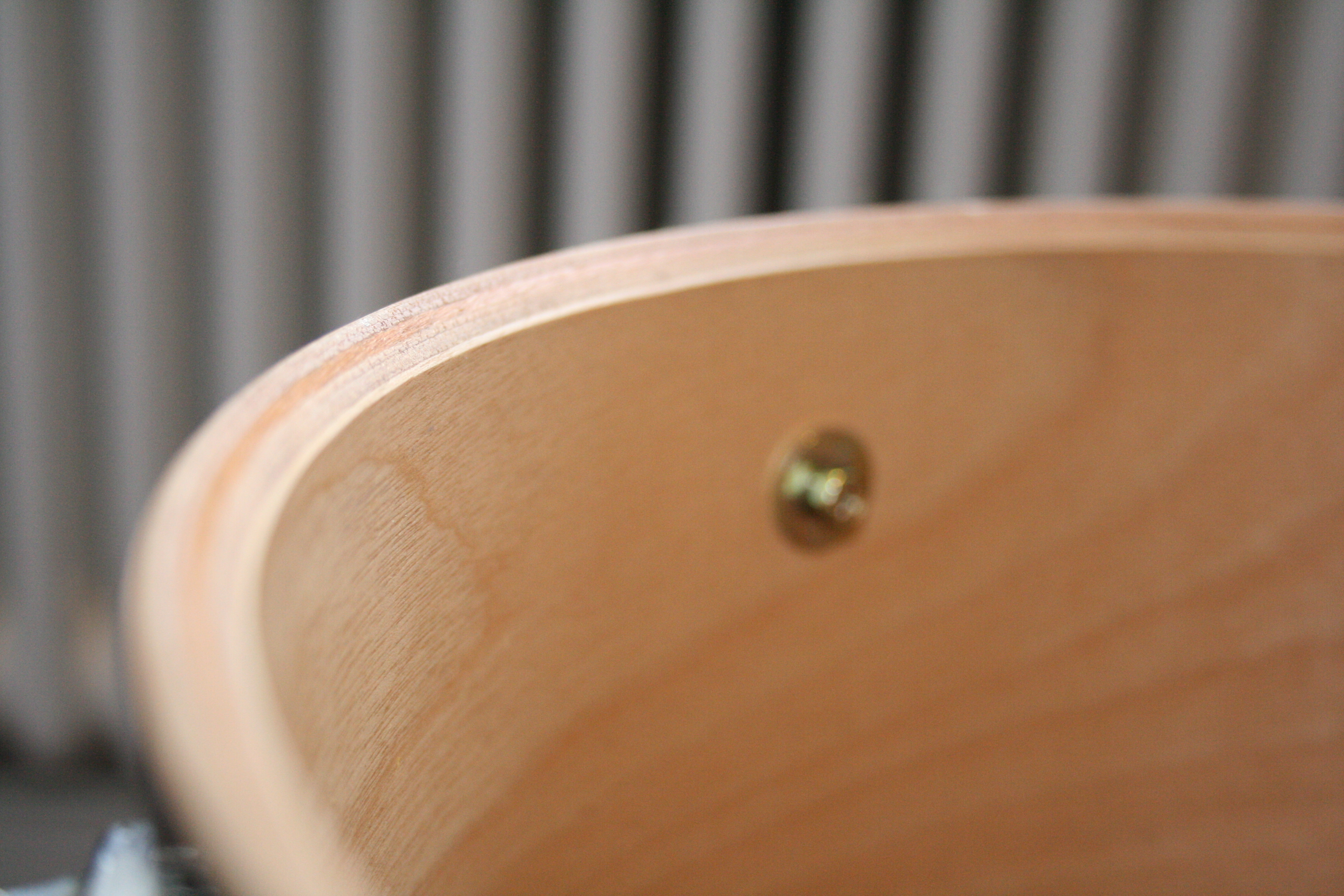
Rock Tour Custom bearing edge and shell interior.

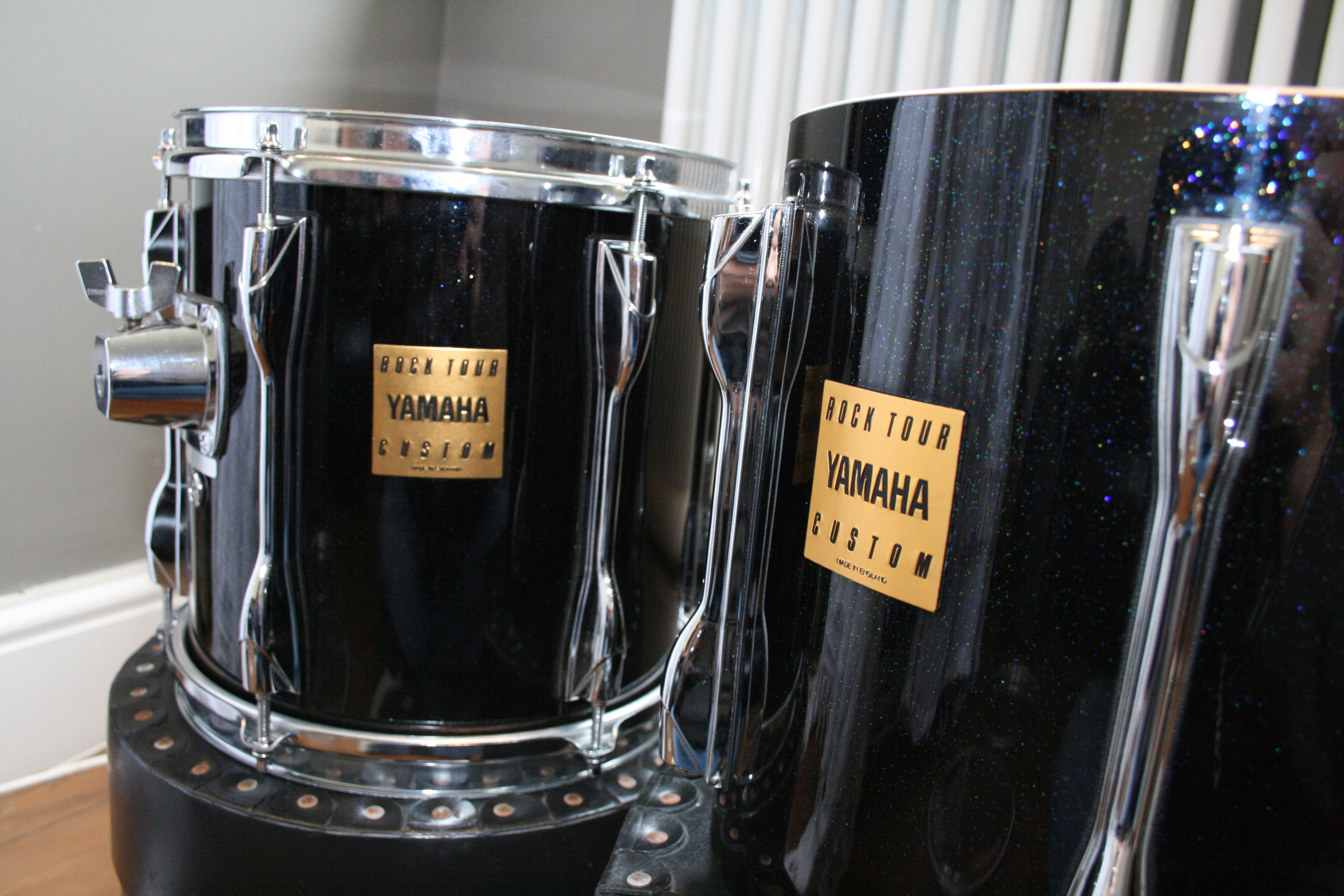
Black Sparkle Rock Tour Custom tom toms.

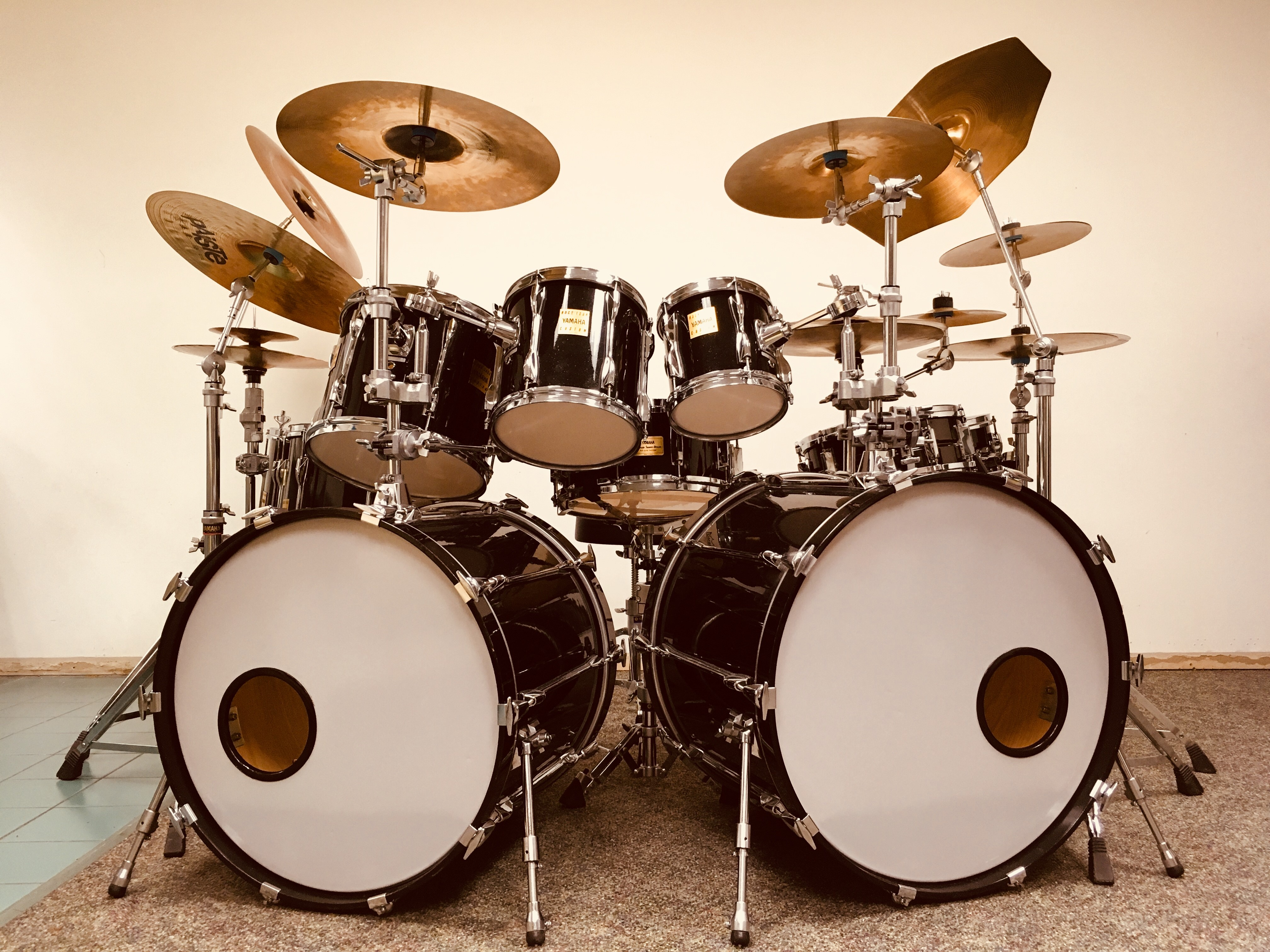
