= Seibu 4000 series =

Electric multiple unit train type operated by Seibu Railway in Japan

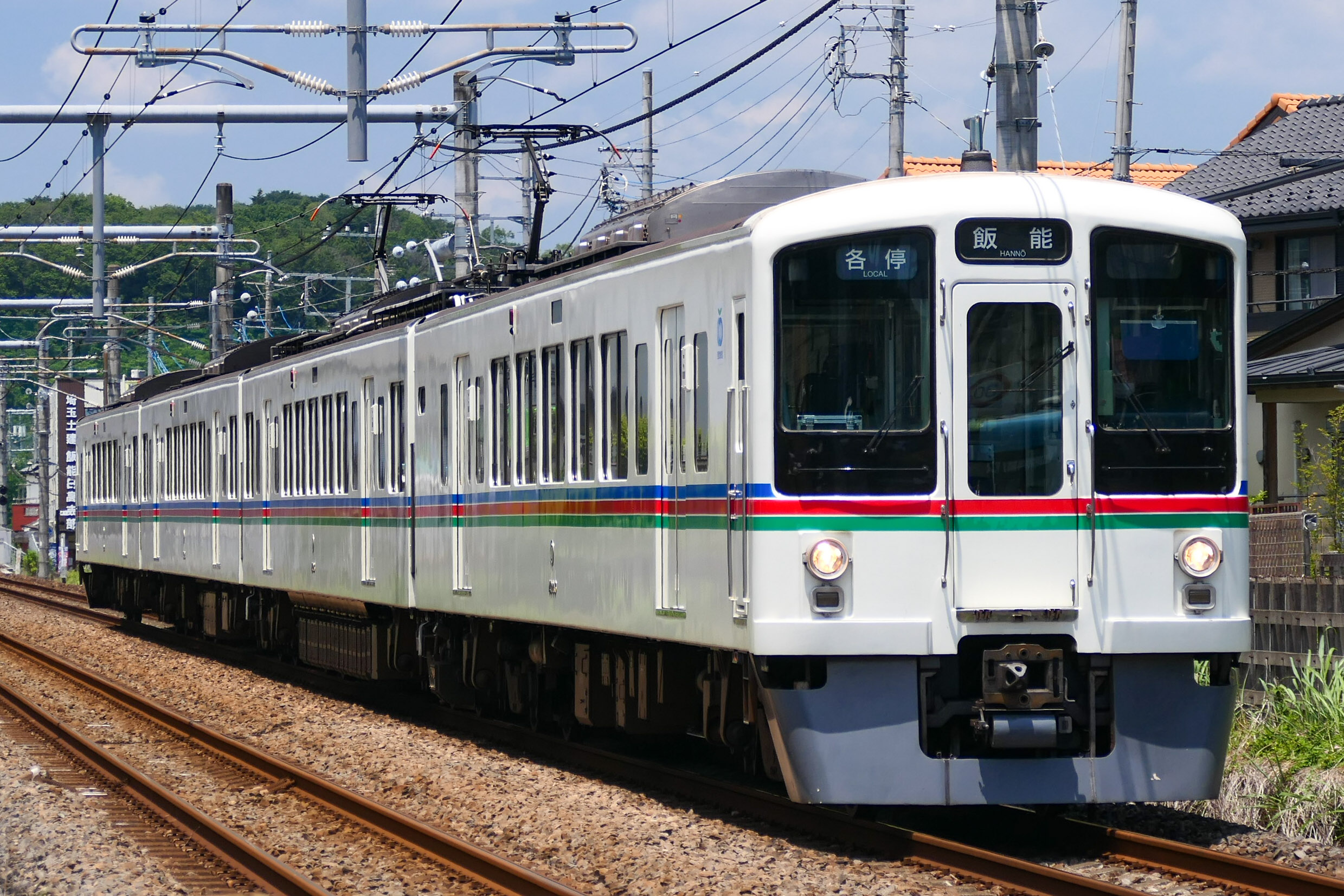
- A 4000 series set on the Seibu Ikebukuro Line in June 2024
- In service: 1988–present
- Manufacturer: Tokyu Car Corporation
- Constructed: 1988-1992
- Refurbished: 2002
- Number built: 48 vehicles (12 sets)
- Number in service: 48 vehicles (12 sets)
- Formation: 4 cars per trainset
- Fleet numbers: 4001–4023 (odd numbers only)
- Operator: Seibu Railway
- Depot: Musashigaoka
- Lines served: Seibu Ikebukuro Line, Seibu Chichibu Line, Chichibu Main Line

Specifications
- Car body construction: Steel
- Car length: 20 m (65 ft 7 in)
- Doors: 2 pairs per side
- Maximum speed: 105 km/h (65 mph)
- Traction system: Resistor control
- Traction motors: HS-836-Nrb; HS-836-Prb
- Power output: 150 kW
- Acceleration: 2.3 km/(h⋅s) (1.4 mph/s)
- Electric system: 1,500 V DC
- Current collection: overhead catenary
- Track gauge: 1,067 mm (3 ft 6 in)

The Seibu 4000 series (西武4000系) is an electric multiple unit (EMU) train type operated by the private railway operator Seibu Railway mainly on Seibu Chichibu Line services in Saitama Prefecture, Japan since 1988.

== Design ==
The 4000 series trains were built between 1988 and 1992 by combining electrical equipment from former 101 series EMUs with new steel bodies. The trains are finished in a livery of ivory white with blue, red, and green stripes along the waist line, the team colours of the Saitama Seibu Lions baseball team. The driving cabs have a similar configuration to the earlier 101 series and 2000 series EMUs, with a left-hand master controller and right-hand brake control.

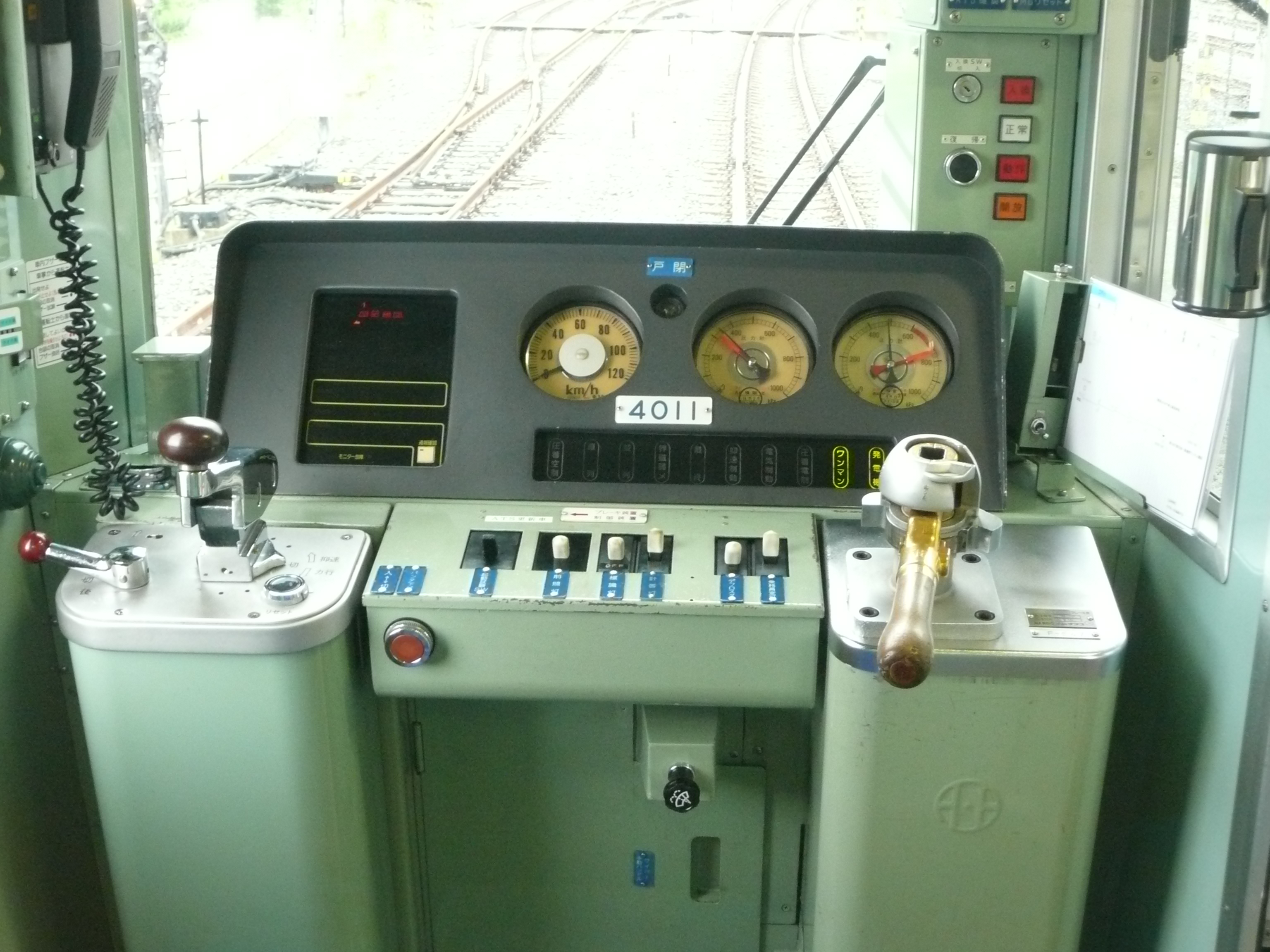
The driving cab console

== Operations ==
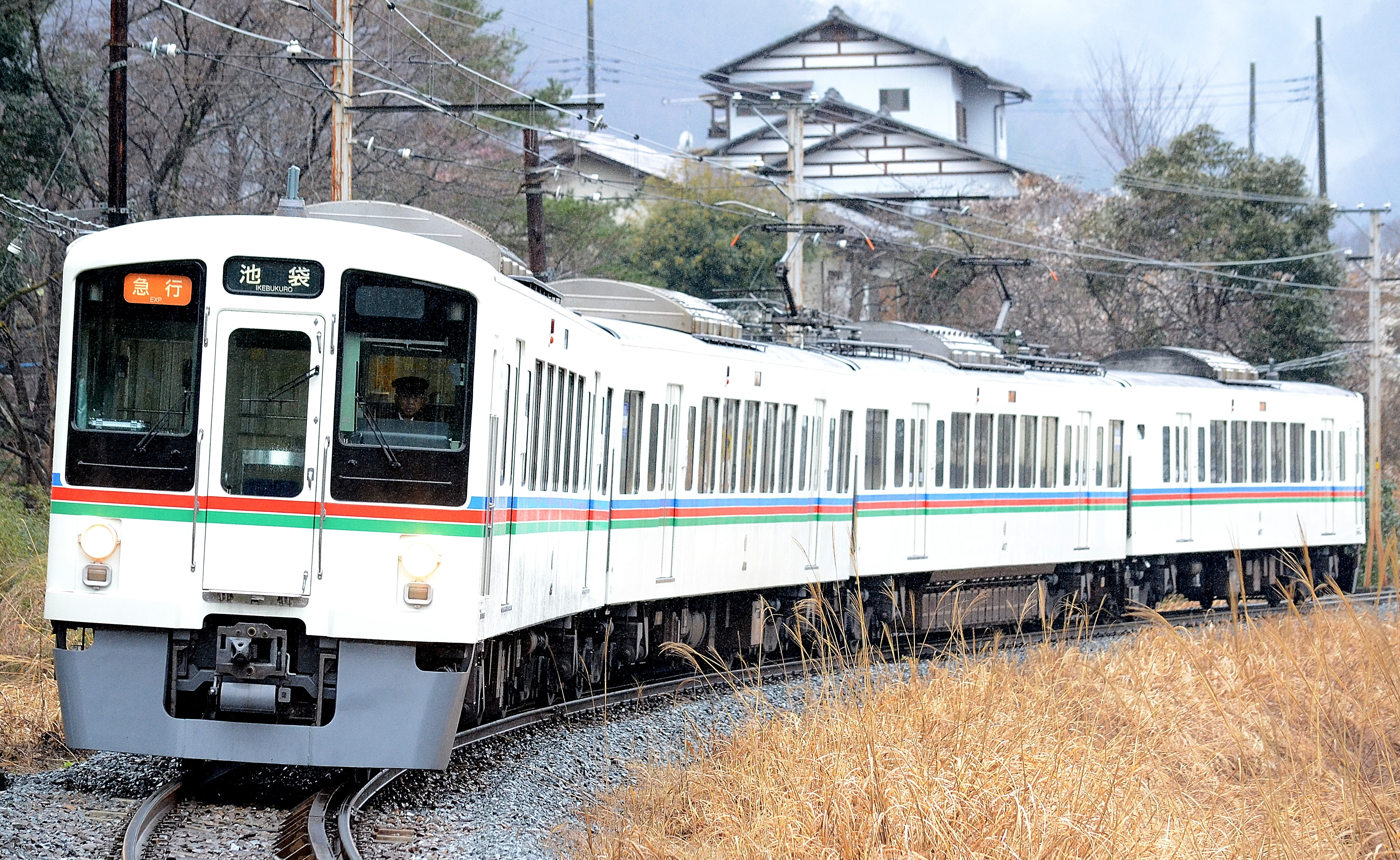
A 4000 series set on the Chichibu Main Line, March 2017

The fleet of four-car trains is primarily used on all-stations driver only operation "Local" services on the Seibu Chichibu Line between Hannō and Seibu Chichibu, but the trains are also used as eight-car formations on through "Rapid Express" train services from Ikebukuro on the Seibu Ikebukuro Line to Mitsumineguchi and Nagatoro on the Chichibu Main Line. These trains divide and couple at Yokoze, with separate portions for Mitsumineguchi and Nagatoro.

== Fleet ==
As of 1 April 2016, the fleet consists of twelve four-car sets, numbered 4001 to 4023, based at Musashigaoka depot.

== Formations ==
Sets are formed as shown below with two motored ("M") cars and two non-powered driving trailer ("Tc") cars, and the Tc1 car at the southern (Ikebukuro) end.

Designation	Tc1	M1	M2	Tc2
Numbering	40xx	41xx	41xx	40xx

The M1 car is fitted with two single-arm pantographs (originally lozenge-type pantographs).

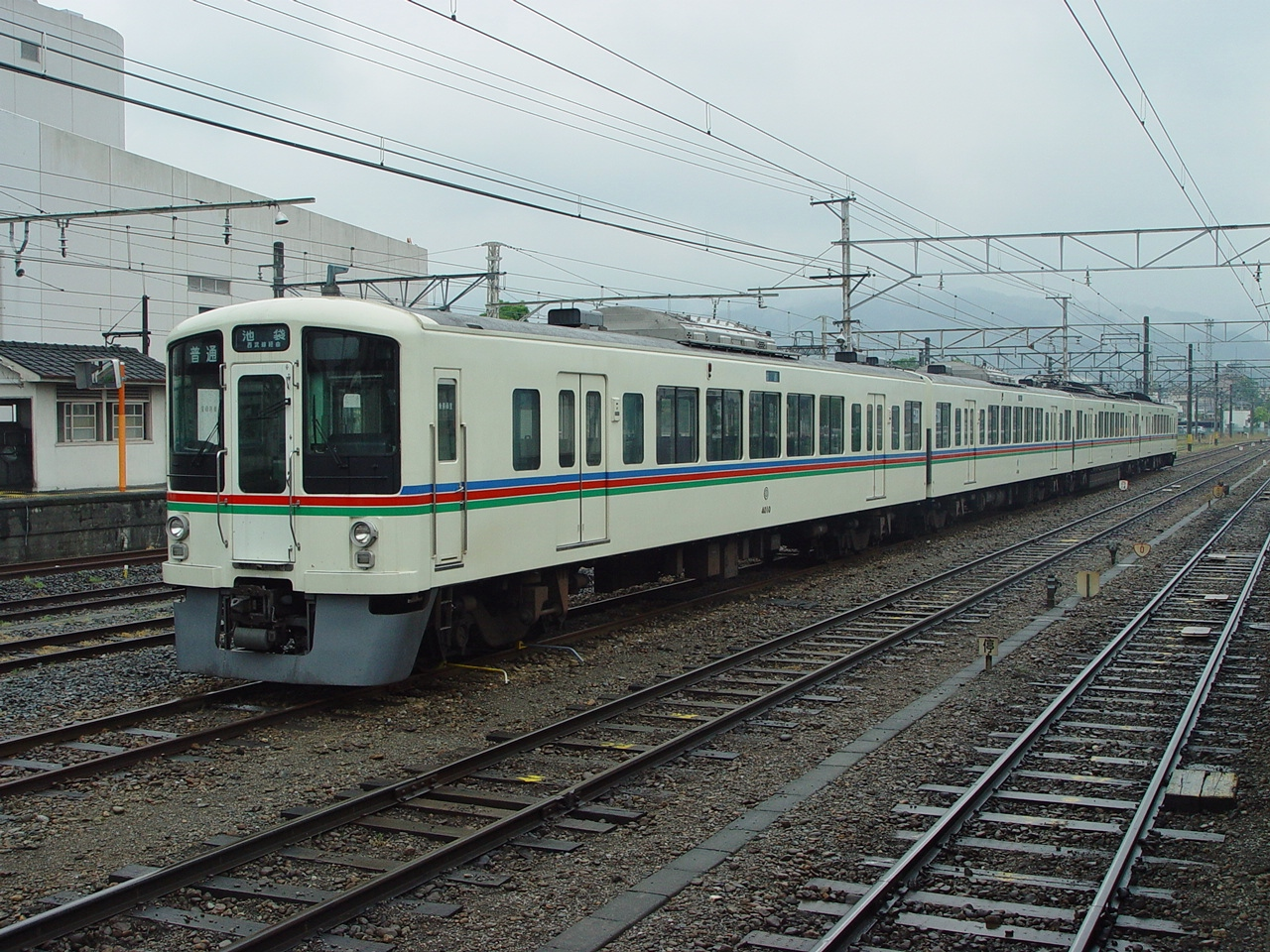
Car 4002 of set 4001 in May 2006

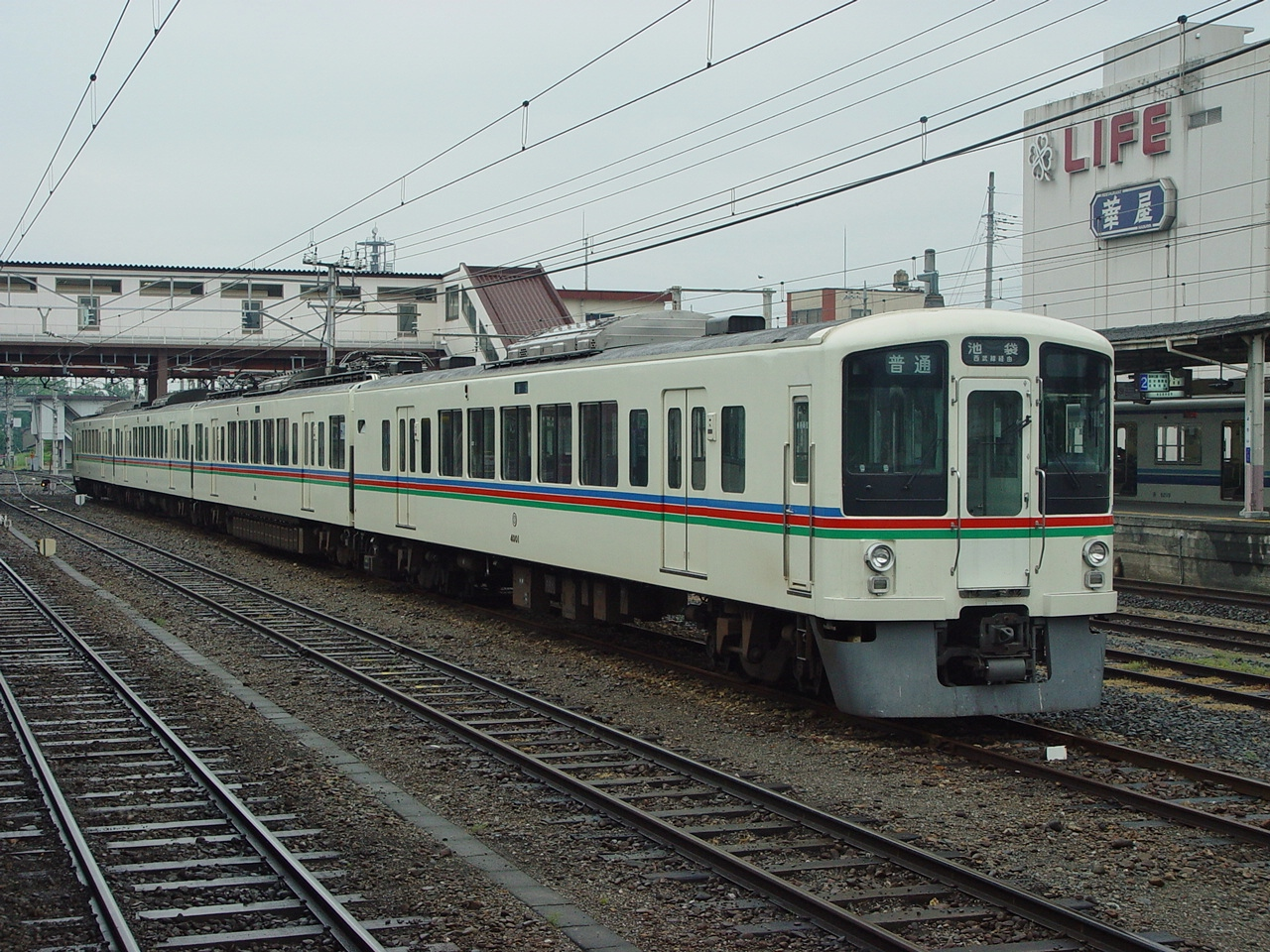
Car 4001 of set 4001 in May 2006

== Interior ==
Seating mainly consists of fixed 4-person facing seating bays, with longitudinal bench seating next to the doorways. The Tc1 car has a toilet.

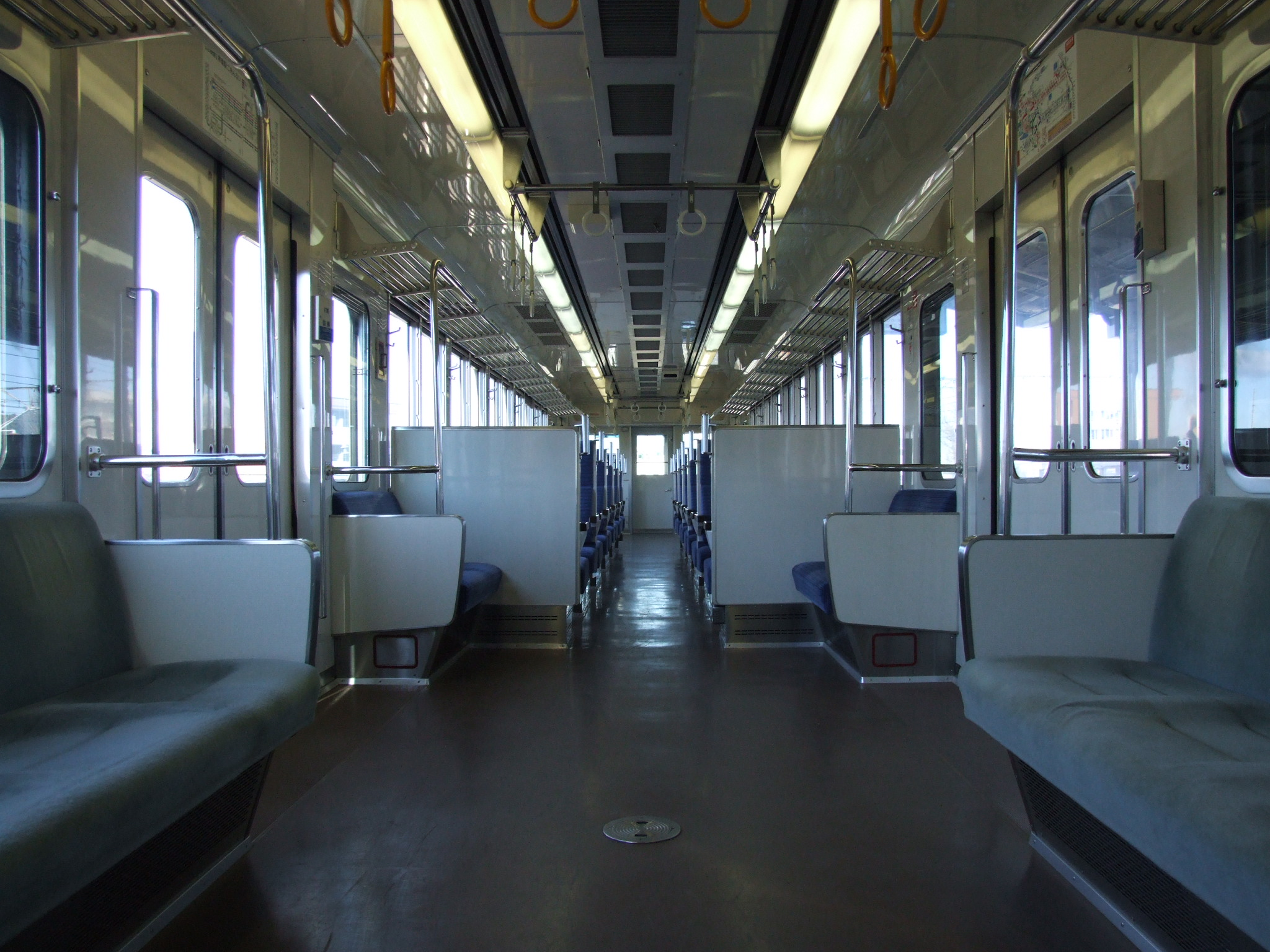
Train interior view

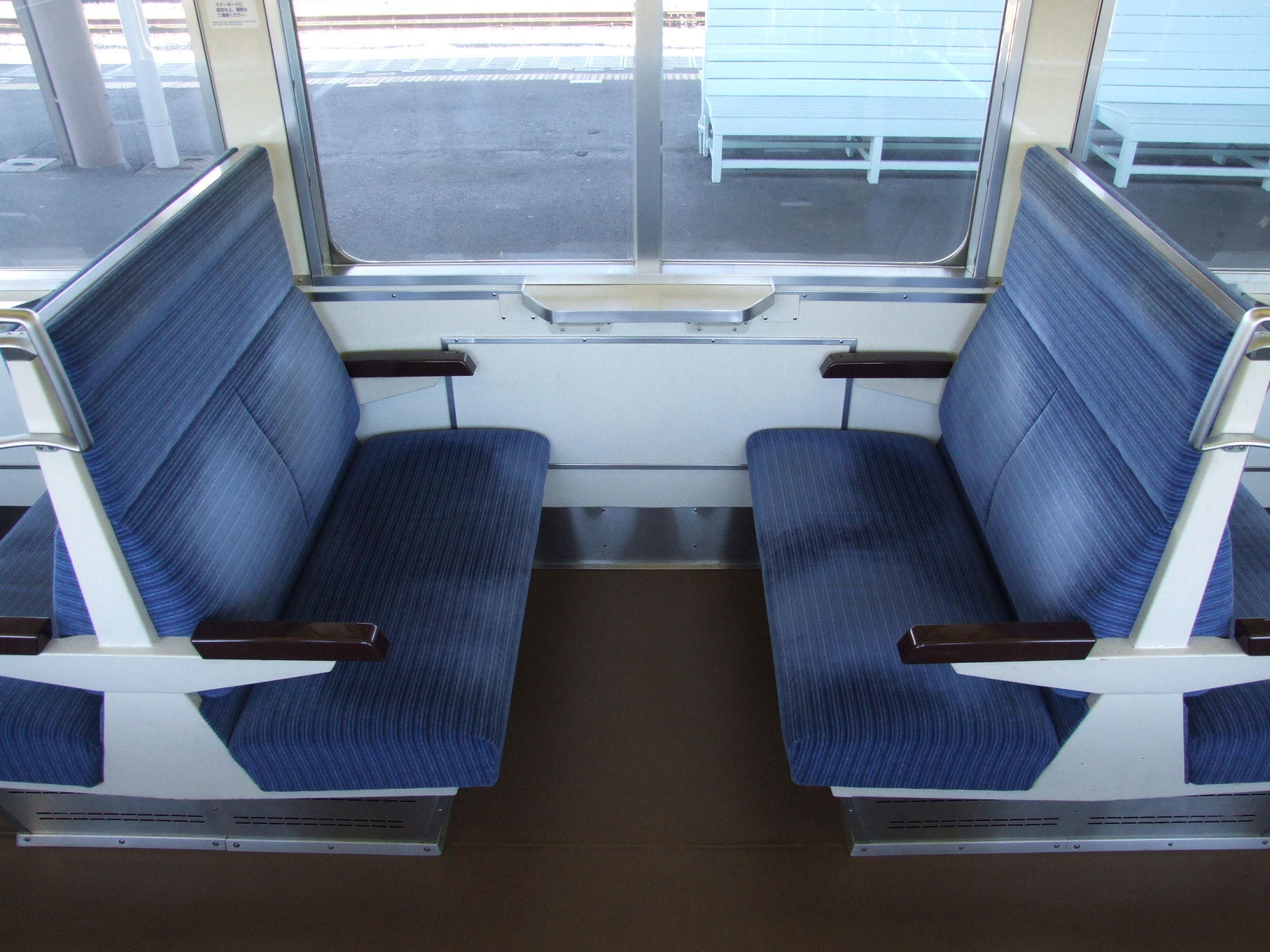
4-person seating bay

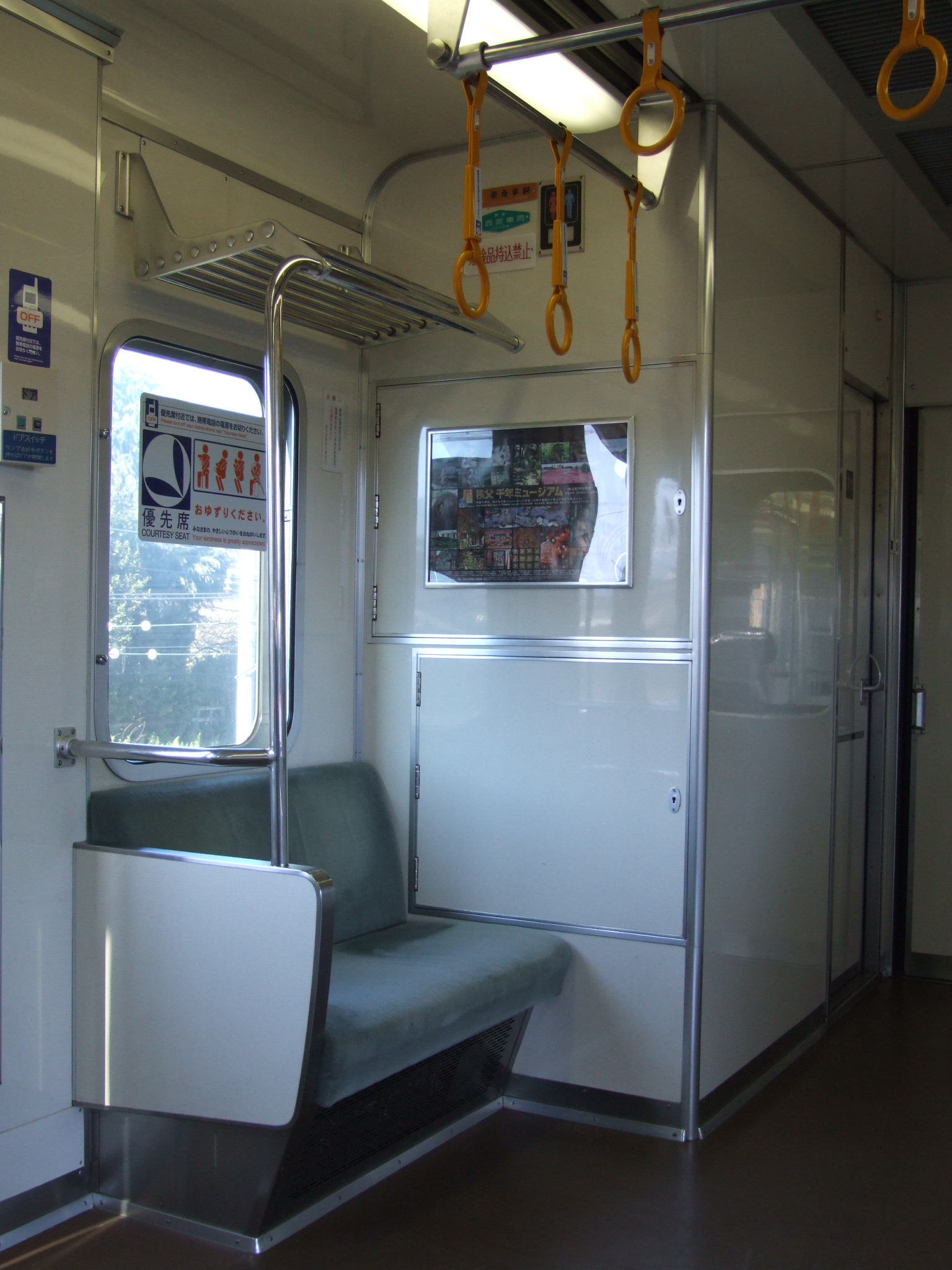
Toilet and priority seating

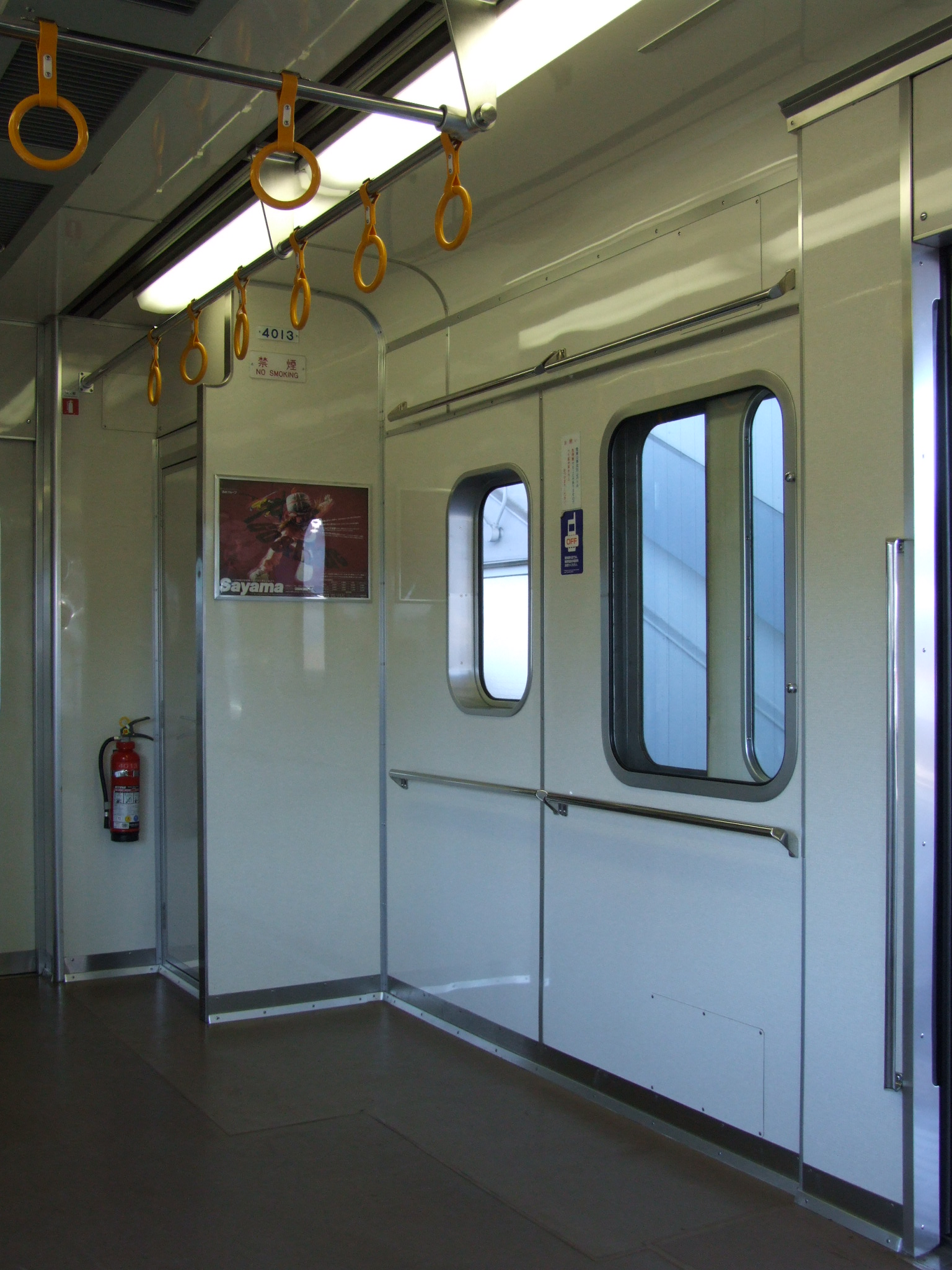
Wheelchair space

== History ==
The first train entered service in 1988, with twelve four-car sets built by 1992. The fleet was refurbished in 2002 for use on wanman driver only operation services on the Seibu Chichibu Line. Modifications included the addition of automatic passenger announcements.

== Fifty-two Seats of Happiness ==
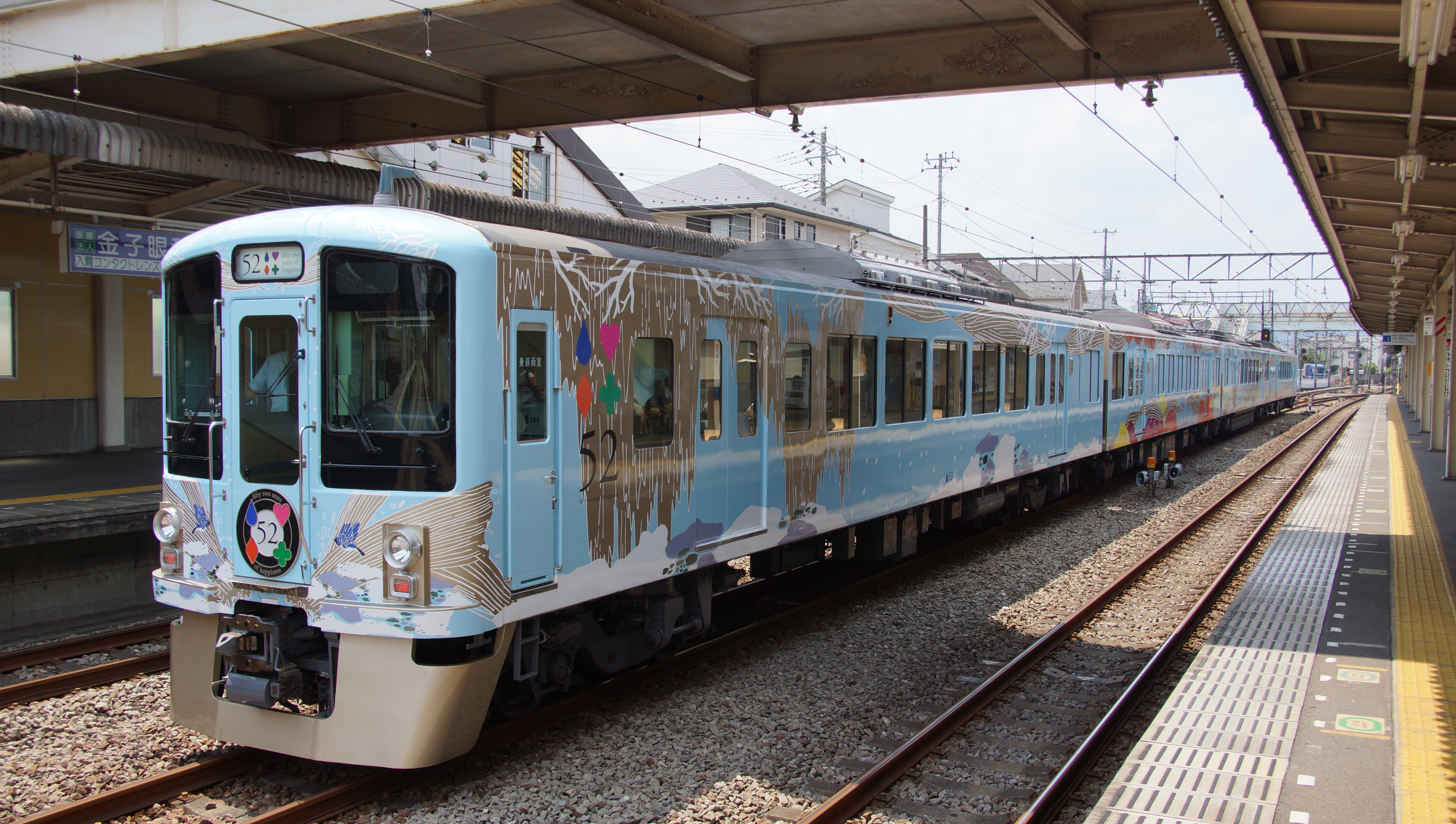
The Fifty-two Seats of Happiness set in August 2016

One four-car set was modified from set 4009 into a tourist train called the Fifty-two Seats of Happiness (52席の至福, Gojūni seki no shifuku) for use on services operating between Seibu Shinjuku and Ikebukuro in Tokyo and Seibu Chichibu and Hon-Kawagoe in Saitama Prefecture, entering service from 17 April 2016. The interior and exterior design of the train was overseen by architect Kengo Kuma.

The automated on-board passenger announcements in Japanese use the voice of TV presenter Tomomi Kuno, and the melody chimes accompanying the announcements were created by musician Minoru Mukaiya, who was formerly the keyboard player in the group Casiopea.

The train is formed as shown below, with car 1 at the Tokyo (southern) end.

Car No.	1	2	3	4
Numbering	4009	4109	4110	4010
Seating capacity	-	26	-	26
Facilities	Multipurpose space, toilets	Dining seating	Open kitchen	Dining seating

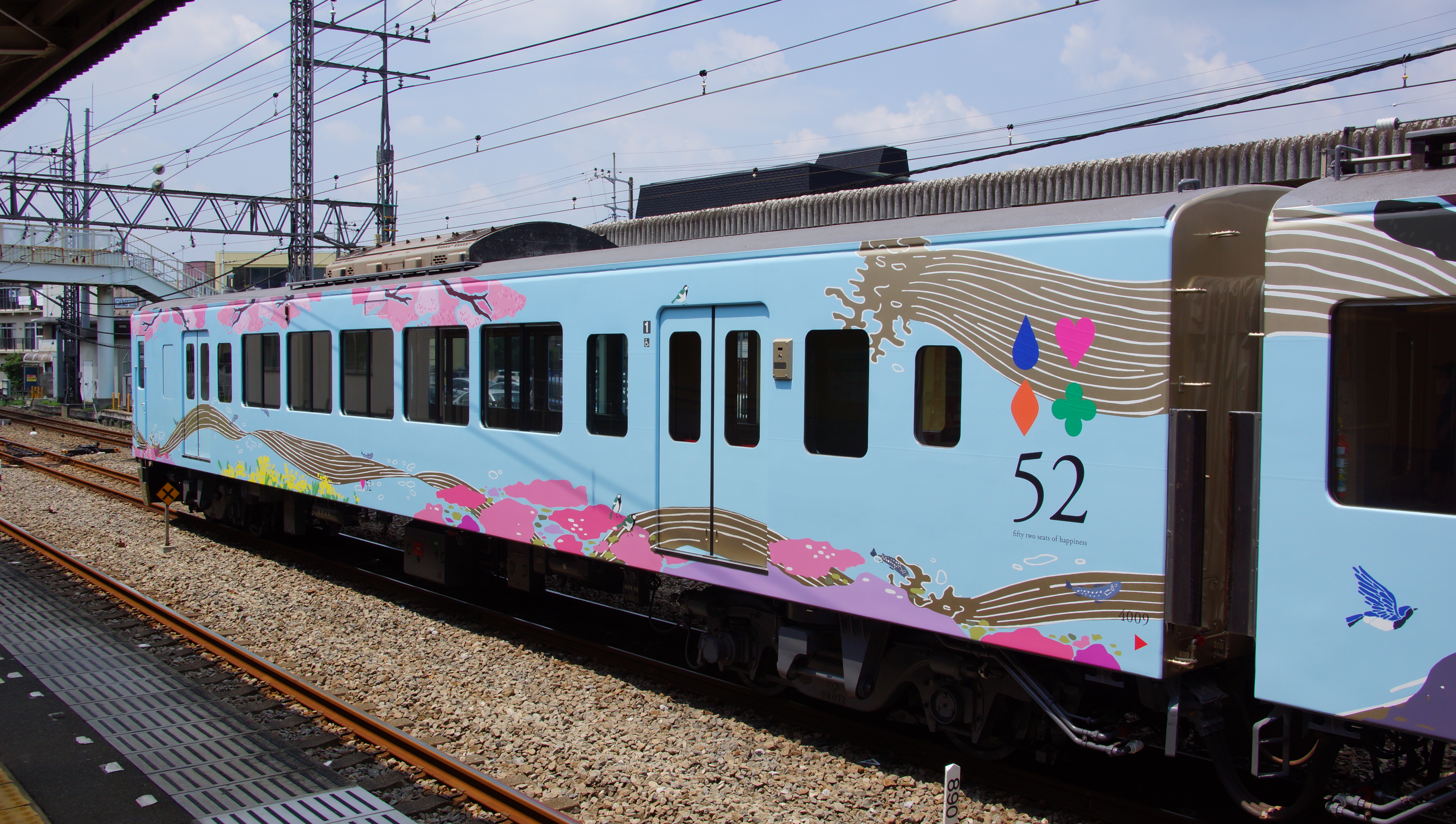
Car 4009 (car 1) with spring motif

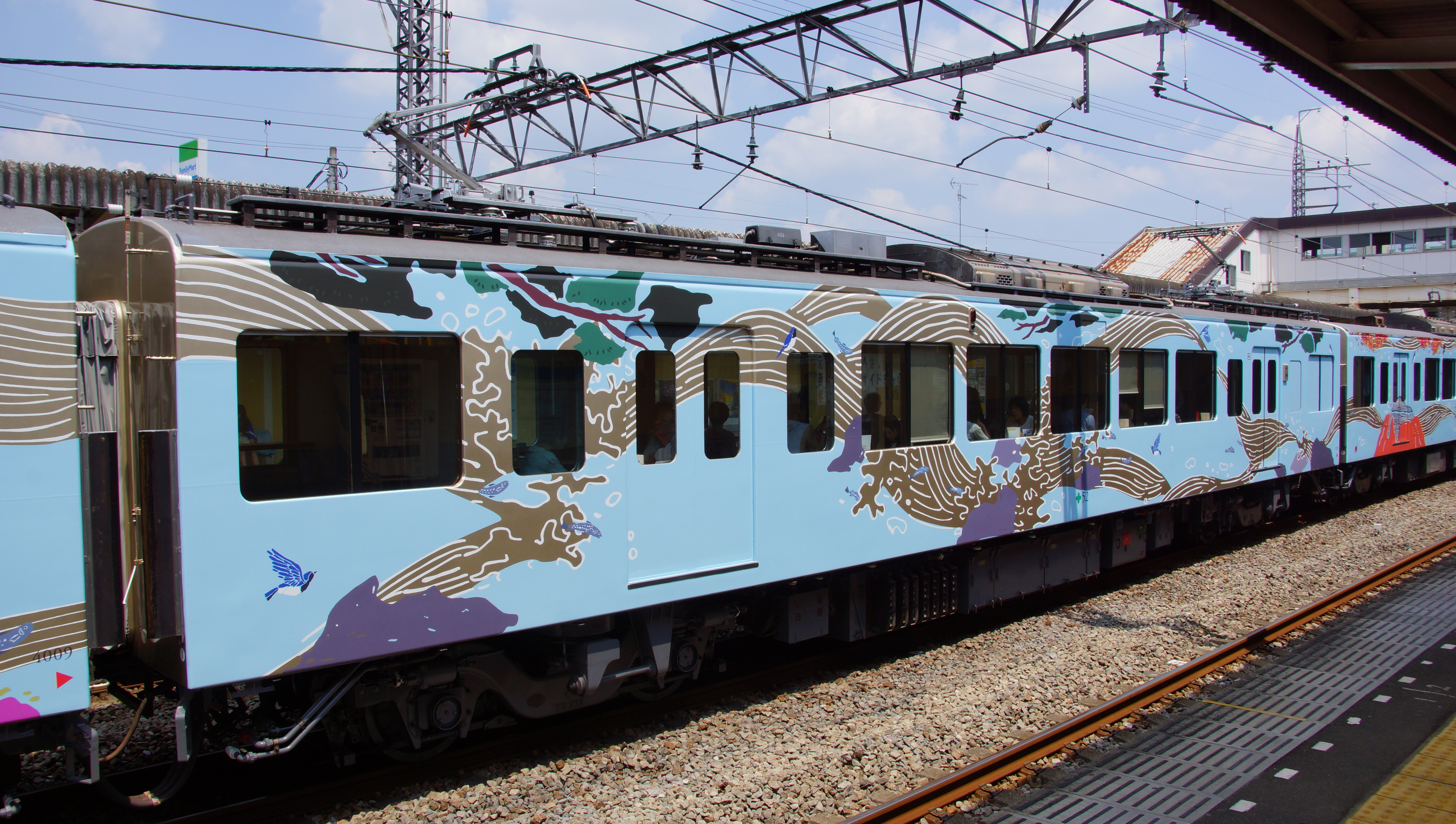
Car 4109 (car 2) with summer motif

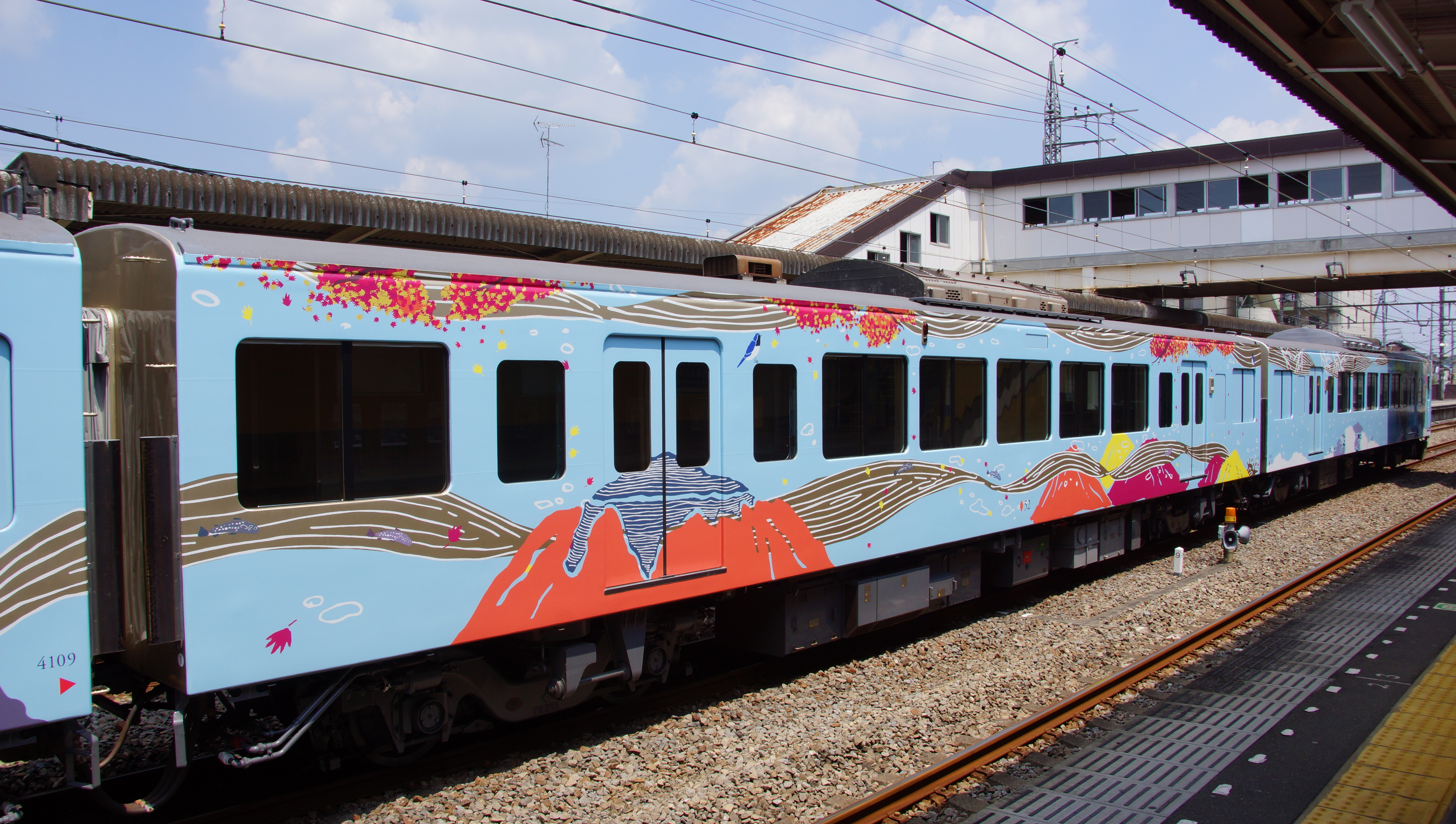
Car 4110 (car 3) with autumn motif

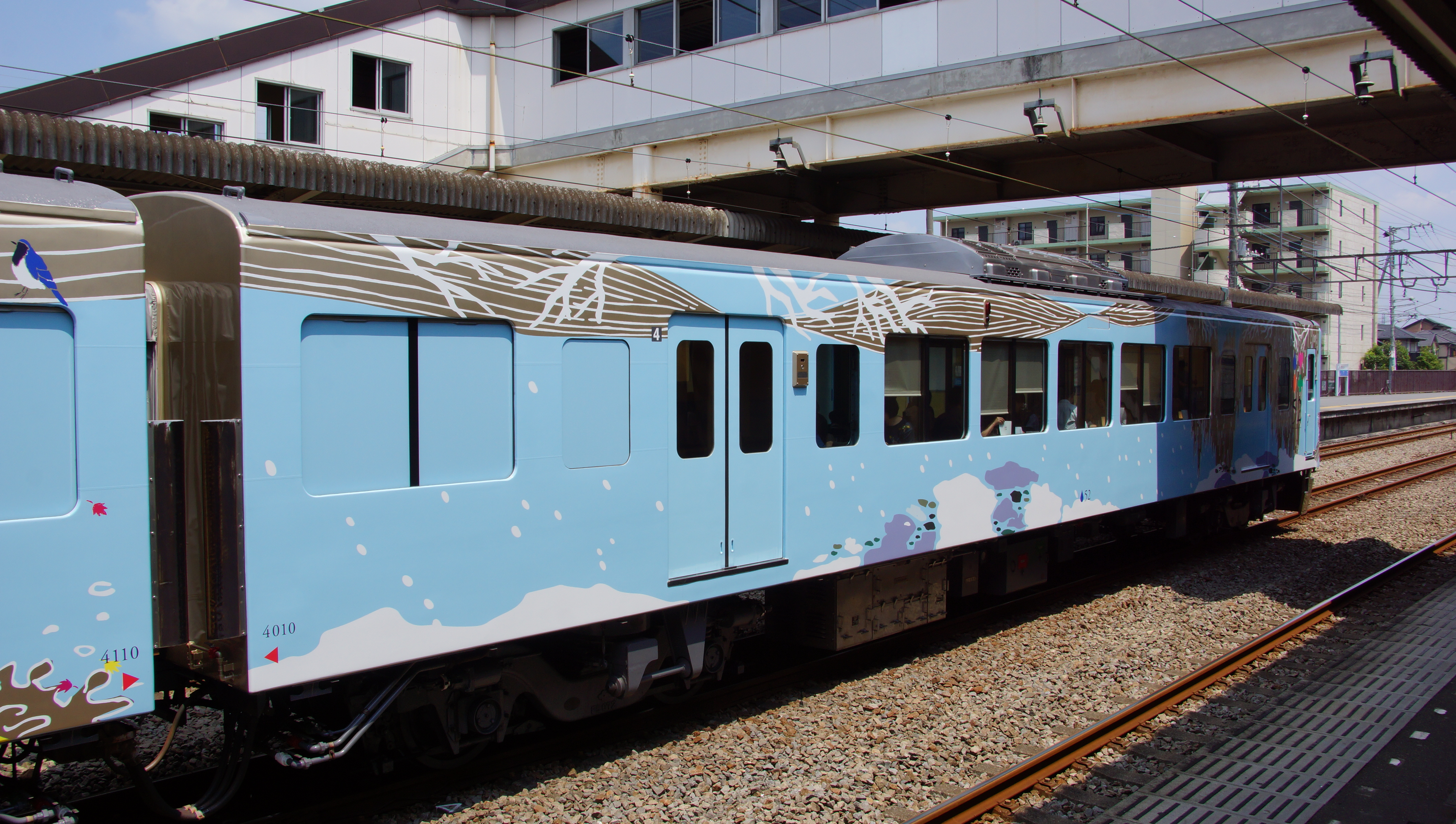
Car 4010 (car 4) with winter motif

== Special liveries ==
From 16 January 2016, set 4015 received a special Hello Kitty livery as part of a campaign to promote tourism to the Chichibu area. It is scheduled to operate in this livery until 27 March 2016.
