= Cotton (album) =

Studio album by Akira Jimbo
- Released: 1986
- Recorded: January 13-February 2, 1986
- Studio: Studio Sound Recorders
- Genre: Jazz
- Length: 39:09
- Producer: Akira Jimbo

Akira Jimbo chronology
Cotton (1986)	Palette (1989)

Cotton is a 1986 debut studio album released in 1986 by the Japanese freelance jazz fusion drummer Akira Jimbo.

== Track listing ==
1. "Red Lotus Man" – 3:36
2. "Twilight Eyes" – 4:21
3. "The Silent Road "Hellen"" – 4:29
4. "After Midnight" – 4:54
5. "The Light Around Us "Chris"" – 4:41
6. "It's a Holiday" – 4:07
7. "Blue Imagination" – 4:09
8. "The Mood in the Melody" – 4:26
9. "Hot Winter Night in the Valley" – 4:26

== Personnel ==
- Akira Jimbo — Composer, Arrangement, Drums (all tracks)
- Abraham Laboriel — Bass
- Carlos Rios, Paul Jackson Jr. — Guitar
- Paulinho Da Costa — Percussion
- Don Freeman, Greg Phillinganes — Piano
- Brandon Fields — Saxophone, Flute
- Bryan Ferry — Steel Drums
- Bruce Fowler — Trombone
- Rick Braun, Walt Fowler — Trumpet
