= Flower (Akira Jimbo album) =

Studio album by Akira Jimbo
- Released: January 28, 1997
- Genre: Jazz
- Length: 46:08
- Producer: Akira Jimbo, Kazu Matsui

Akira Jimbo chronology
Panama Man (1995)	Flower (1997)	Stone Butterfly (1997)

Flower is the eighth solo album by drummer Akira Jimbo and was released on January 28, 1997. It features several guest musicians, such as longtime collaborators Gary Stockdale and Keiko Matsui.

== Track listing ==
1. "Blooming Forest" – 4:27
2. "Let the Breeze" – 4:55
3. "Violet" – 4:21
4. "Rouge" – 4:27
5. "Sloppy Joe" – 5:02
6. "Trial Root" – 4:26
7. "Rosary – 4:42
8. "Red Soil" – 4:27
9. "Cactus" – 4:32
10. "Windflower" – 4:45
