= Tetsuo Sakurai =

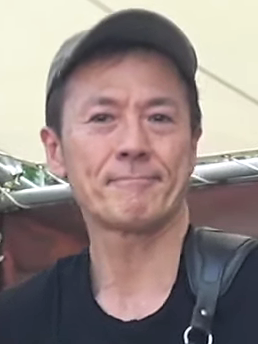
- Sakurai in 2019

Background information
- Born: November 13, 1957 (age 68)
- Genres: Jazz fusion
- Occupations: Bassist, songwriter, producer
- Instrument: Bass guitar
- Years active: 1976–present
- Website: www.tetsuosakurai.com

Tetsuo Sakurai (櫻井(桜井) 哲夫, Sakurai Tetsuo; born 13 November 1957) is a Japanese bassist. To date, he has released a total of 37 albums as a member of Casiopea and Jimsaku and as a solo artist, and has also made 3 bass instructional videos.

== History ==
Tetsuo Sakurai started playing bass when he was 13 years old.

In 1976, Sakurai, with Issei Noro, founded jazz fusion band Casiopea. He released 19 albums while in Casiopea but later left the band with Akira Jimbo in 1989 over musical differences. Both of them then went on to form a new jazz fusion supergroup, Jimsaku. Earlier, while Sakurai was in Casiopea, in 1983, he took a trip to Brazil and discovered Samba and Brazilian music, this heavily influenced his work with late Casiopea, Shambara, and early Jimsaku.

Jimsaku was active for nine years, until 1998, when it was disbanded and both Sakurai and Jimbo went on to pursue individual solo careers. While Jimbo rejoined Casiopea, Sakurai never did. Both Sakurai and Jimbo now form part of a group with ex-Casiopea keyboardist Minoru Mukaiya called Katsushika Trio founded in 2021. The three formed part of the same Casiopea cast except Jimbo which entered Casiopea after Casiopea's first drummer Takashi Sasaki left, during the 80s.

=== Solo ===
Sakurai's third solo album TLM20, released in 2000, was recorded live in a concert with Casiopea members Issei Noro and Minoru Mukaiya, Akira Jimbo, and Kazuki Katsuta of Dimension. The fourth solo album Gentle Hearts, released in 2001, was recorded with Greg Howe & Dennis Chambers. The fifth solo album Cartas do Brasil was released in 2003 and was a vocal ballad cover album recorded in Rio de Janeiro with Djavan, Ivan Lins, and Rosa Passos. In 2004, Tetsuo toured with Greg & Dennis. The following year, the tour live performances was released on DVD titled Gentle Hearts Tour 2004.

Sakurai is currently composing and playing his own music as a solo artist with domestic and foreign musicians.

== Discography ==
=== Casiopea ===
- Casiopea (1979)
- Super Flight (1979)
- Thunder Live (1980)
- Make Up City (1980)
- Eyes of the Mind (1981)
- Cross Point (1981)
- Mint Jams (1982)
- 4x4 (1982)
- Photographs (1983)
- Jive Jive (1983)
- The Soundgraphy (1984)
- Down Upbeat (1984)
- Halle (1985)
- Casiopea Live (1985)
- Sun Sun (1986)
- Casiopea Perfect Live II (1987)
- Platinum (1987)
- Euphony (1988)
- Casiopea World Live '88 (1988)

=== Shambara ===
- Shambara (1989)

=== Jimsaku ===
- Jimsaku (1990)
- 45°C (1991)
- Jade (1992)
- Viva! (1992)
- 100% (1993)
- Wind Loves Us (1993)
- Navel (1994)
- Blaze of Passion (1995)
- Best Selection (1995)
- Dispensation (1996)
- MEGA db (1997)
- JIMSAKU BEYOND (2021)

=== Katsushika Trio ===
- M.R.I_Mirai (2023)
- Wild Guys In The Universe (2024)
- "Organic" (2025)

=== Solo ===
- Dewdrops (1986)
- A Gate of the 21st Century (1999)
- TLM 20 ~ Live Memories of 20 years ~ (2000)
- Gentle Hearts (2001)
- Cartas do Brasil ~ブラジルからの手紙~ (2003)
- Gentle Hearts Tour 2004 (2004)
- My Dear Music Life (2009)
- Vital World (2010)
- Talking Bass (2012)
- Nothin But the Bass (2015)
