= Issei Noro =

Japanese jazz fusion guitarist (born 1957)

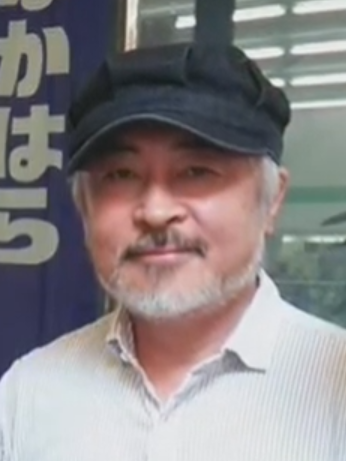
- Noro in 2017

Background information
- Born: 1 January 1957 (age 69); Meguro, Tokyo, Japan
- Genres: Jazz fusion; hard rock; jazz funk; smooth jazz
- Occupations: Guitarist; songwriter; producer; composer
- Years active: 1976–present
- Labels: Alfa; Hats Unlimited
- Member of: Casiopea; Inspirits
- Website: isseinoro.com

Issei Noro (野呂 一生, Noro Issei; born 1 January 1957) is a Japanese guitarist, songwriter, producer, and composer, best known as a founding member of the jazz fusion band Casiopea.

Noro began his musical career in 1976 with Casiopea, serving as the group's guitarist. Casiopea made its recording debut in 1979 with their self-titled album, and Noro remained with his band until 2006, when activities were suspended. He returned when Casiopea restarted in 2012 following the 2011 earthquake, tsunami, and subsequent nuclear disaster, and continues to perform with his group. Outside Casiopea, Noro formed the band Inspirits in 2008 and has collaborated with other jazz fusion musicians. He is an endorsed artist of Yamaha, which has provided him with custom-made guitars, and is noted for his guitar-playing techniques.

== Early and personal life ==
Noro was born on Japanese New Year's Day, 1 January 1957 in a Meguro ward of Tokyo, Japan. Because he was born on Japanese New Year, he was given his name, "Issei" (一生), meaning "lifetime". His father passed away when he was one year old, and then, he was raised by his single mother, who worked as a schoolteacher. His grandparents moved from Aomori to Tokyo to live nearby and help raise him and his older sister. During his childhood, he aspired to be a painter and developed a strong appreciation for art.

As a junior high student, Noro began playing guitar after seeing a friend's steel-string acoustic guitar, later switching to electric guitar and seeing an American band Grand Funk Railroad on tour. Then, he attended Tokyo Metropolitan Tamagawa High School, where he became obsessed with hard rock and became influenced by Jimmy Page and Jeff Beck. During this time, he joined a rock community, where he met bassist Tetsuo Sakurai, and began rehearsing with him in sessions that led to the formation of Casiopea. He also started learning jazz, studying theory from books by Joe Pass and Sadao Watanabe. After graduating senior high school, he enrolled at Meisei University and joined a band Fancy House, a band made up of the university's light music club members. He dropped out after one year to pursue music full time.

Since 1990, Noro has served as a visiting professor at Tokyo College of Music, where he teaches guitar, ensemble, and arrangement; his instruction has included remote lessons. In recent years, he moved to a suburb of Tokyo and has been described as a living semi‑retired life, during which he watches science fiction films on streaming services, as well as YouTube videos. In an interview with Encount, he said that he practices guitar daily and would considered retirement if he were no longer able to realize his musical ideas. Noro is also a painter, having continued to paint in his later years and providing artwork for the cover arts of bands, where he involved in. He published his autobiography, Watashi Jidai Watakushi-Jidai, on 20 December 2016.

== Bands ==
=== Casiopea ===
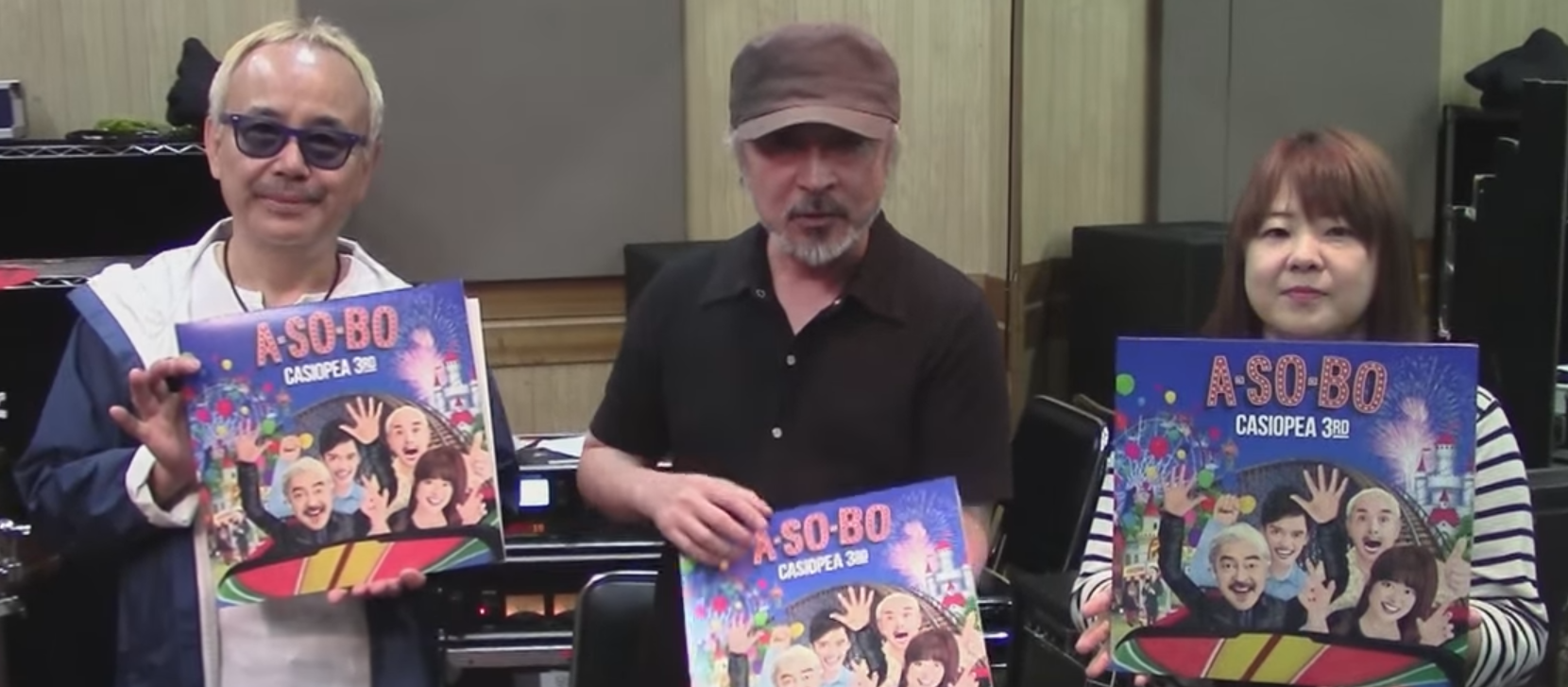
Noro (center) promoting the album A•So•Bo with other members of Casiopea, 2015.

In 1974, Noro and Sakurai formed a live‑house group as the only steady members. Lacking a name, a magazine refused to publish an interview until they chose one. Following his mother's suggestion, Noro adopted Casiopea from the constellation Cassiopeia. With keyboardist Hidehiko Koike and drummer Tohru "Rika" Suzuki, the group entered Yamaha's 1976 EastWest amateur contest, where Noro won Best Guitarist and the band reached the finals. After lineup changes brought in keyboardist Minoru Mukaiya and drummer Takashi Sasaki, they reentered the contest the following year; Noro again won Best Guitarist and the band took Best Group. Their success caught the attention of Alfa Records, leading to Casiopea's 1979 self-titled debut album. After Sasaki left, the band recruited Akira Jimbo to be on drums in 1980.

In 1989, Sakurai and Jimbo formed the band Shambara with other musicians, with Noro objecting to them doing so and told them to disband Shambara. Sakurai and Jimbo instead left Casiopea, and Noro's acquaintances, bassist Yoshihiro Naruse and drummer Masaaki Hiyama, joined the next year. Noro continued with the band until 2006, when he put Casiopea on hiatus, wanting to stop playing with Casiopea. He returned to Casiopea in 2012, motivated to help lift spirits after the 2011 Tōhoku earthquake and tsunami, and recruited organist Kiyomi Otaka after Mukaiya did not rejoin. Since his 2012 return from hiatus, he has continued to perform and record with the band, which was renamed Casiopea 3rd in 2012, Casiopea‑P4 in 2022, and reverted to Casiopea in 2025.

=== Inspirits ===
After Casiopea went on hiatus in 2006, Noro, believing the band had effectively disbanded, began composing more relaxed, sonically distinct material. For the album Inner Times, he enlisted various session musicians, including Casiopea drummer Akira Jimbo and keyboardist Kento Ohgiya. While seeking a bassist he was introduced to Yuji Yajima, and keyboardist Ryo Hayashi, who had been assisting Noro, joined as a second keyboardist. Noro decided that instead of putting his work under his name, he would form the band Issei Noro Inspirits in 2008, with the session musicians becoming full members. He named it using the initials of his name along with the word "spirits."

== Other activities ==
=== Solo career ===
In 1985, Noro released his debut solo album Sweet Sphere, having grown tired of touring with Casiopea and wanting to explore new creative avenues. He collaborated with American musicians Patrice Rushen, Nathan East, John Robinson, Phillip Ingram, Jerry Hey, and the band Seawind on the album. In 1996, he released his third album, Top Secret, which was the first CD-Extra album in Japan. He followed this with his fourth album, Under The Sky, in 2001, which was entirely created using a fretless guitar. In April 2020, during the COVID-19 pandemic in Japan, Noro published a series of YouTube videos on the Casiopea YouTube channel, providing guitar lectures for music fans who were struggling during the lockdown.

=== Musical collaborations ===
In 1987, Noro formed the group Ottottorio with fellow guitarists Masahiro Andoh of T-Square and Hirokuni Korekata. The trio performed live in 1988, released two live albums, and released the studio album Triptych in 1998. For T-Square's 35th anniversary concert in 2014, Andoh invited Noro and Korekata to perform with the band.

In 2009, Noro collaborated with Tetsuo Sakurai, his former bandmate in Casiopea, to form an acoustic duo in commemoration of the 30th anniversary of their debut. They performed self-covers of their works as well as other famous songs. In December 2012, Noro participated in the Live in Tokyo Crossover Night concert alongside Casiopea, following that band's resumption of activities. He has also took part in the Guitar☆Man charity concerts in 2013 and 2014.

== Artistry ==
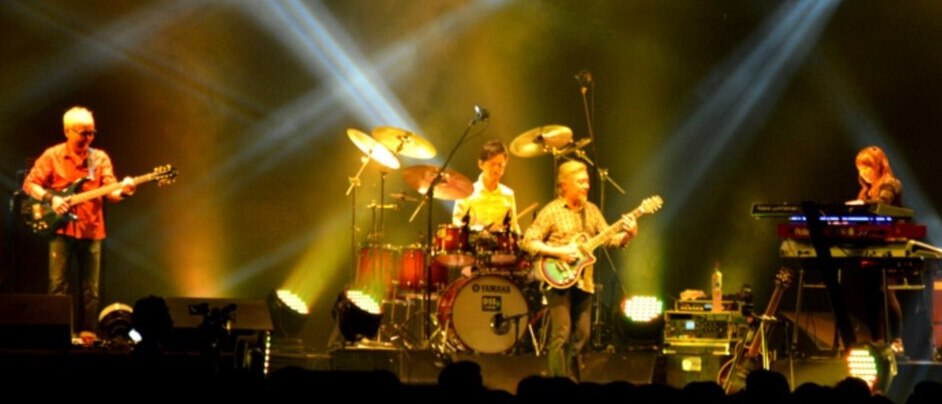
Noro (center-right) playing with Casiopea in 2015.

During his early years with Casiopea, Noro utilized all the guitar-playing techniques he had learned, creating a packed sound. However, as he got older, he reduced the complexity of his playing to pursue more musicality. In Casiopea, Noro prepares the score that he hands to the members for practice, as they do not create demos beforehand. In an interview with The Nikkei, Noro stated that demos limited the band's musicality and that he preferred ideas made during group performance.

Noro currently uses three types of custom Yamaha guitars: an IN-DX, an SG-Mellow, and an SG-Mellow Fretless. His main guitar, the IN-DX, standing for "Issei Noro Deluxe", was made and revealed in 2017 as a gift for his 60th birthday, serving as an upgrade from his earlier signature Yamaha IN-1. The SG-Mellow has been part of Noro's collection since 2007, being a lighter, carved instrument. The SG-Mellow Fretless is a fretless version of the SG-Mellow, introduced a year later in 2008.

Masayoshi Kondo of Mikiki noted that in his album Sweet Sphere, Noro's use of the fretless guitar led the song "Sweet Sphere (A Light Blue Lullabye)" and emphasized that his most significant characteristic was his approach to songs as a composer and arranger.

== Discography ==
Studio albums

- Sweet Sphere (1985)
- Vida (1989)
- Top Secret (1996)
- Under The Sky (2001)
- Light Up (2002)

== Awards and nominations ==
Year	Association	Category	Result	Ref.
1976	EastWest (Yamaha)	Best Guitarist	Won	
1977	EastWest (Yamaha)	Best Guitarist	Won	
