= Tropical Jazz Big Band =

Japanese latin jazz big band

Tropical Jazz Big Band (Japanese: 熱帯JAZZ楽団, Nettai Jazz Gakudan); incorrectly referred to in the United States as Nettai Tropical Jazz Big Band, is a Japanese latin jazz big band.

Led by Carlos Kanno from Orquesta de la Luz, the Tropical Jazz Big Band started out as a group of friends playing for fun and evolved into an 18-piece ensemble. Boasting four percussionists, a three-piece rhythm section, and powerful horns, the band released their first album Live in Yokohama in 1998. That year the band also played in United States. They have played at various jazz festivals and venues, including Carnegie Hall in New York City, United States.

== Members ==
- Shirō Sasaki, Trumpet
- Masanori Suzuki, Trumpet
- Kenji Matsushima, Trumpet
- Sho Okumura, Trumpet
- Hideaki Nakaji, Trombone
- Dairo Miyamoto, Bass Saxophone
- Taisei Aoki, Trombone
- Kan Nishida, Bass Trombone
- Kazuhiko Kondo, Alto Saxophone
- Masahiro Fujioka, Alto Saxophone
- Manteru Nonoda, Tenor Saxophone
- Salt Shionoya, Piano
- Getao Takahashi, Bass
- Akira Jimbo, Drums
- Carlos Kanno, Percussion
- Michiaki Tanaka, Percussion
- Cosmos Kapitza, Percussion
- Gen Ogimi, Percussion
- Yoshi Iba, Percussion

== Discography ==
- Nettai I - Live in Yokohama (1998)
  - First Live Concert Recording and first overall album
- Nettai II - September (1999)
- Nettai III - My Favorite (2000)
- Nettai IV - La Rumba (2000)
- Nettai V - La Noche Tropical (2001)
- Nettai VI - En Vivo (2002)
  - Second Live Concert Recording
- Nettai VII - Spain (2003)
- Nettai VIII - The Covers (2004)
  - First Compilation of their Cover-songs from the previous albums
- Nettai IX - Mas Tropical (2005)
- Nettai X - Swing con Clave (2006)
- Nettai XI - Let's Groove (2007)
- Nettai XII - The Originals (2008)
  - Compilation of Original Compositions from the previous albums
- Nettai XIII - Fantasy (2009)
- Nettai XIV - Liberty (2010)
- Nettai XV - Covers 2 (2012)
  - Second Compilation of their Cover-songs from the previous albums
- Nettai XVI - Easy Lover (2014)
- Nettai XVII - The Best from Movies (2015)
  - Compilation of their Cover-songs that were originally used in movies.
- Nettai XVIII - 25th Anniversary (2020)

== See also ==
- Latin music
- Latin jazz
