= Yamaha Drums =

Japanese drum manufacturer

- Company type: Subsidiary
- Industry: Musical instruments
- Founded: 1967; 59 years ago in Japan
- Headquarters: Hamamatsu, Japan
- Number of locations: 3 (Japan, Indonesia, China)
- Area served: Worldwide
- Products: Acoustic and electronic drum kits, hardware
- Parent: Yamaha Corporation
- Website: yamahadrums

Yamaha Drums is a subsidiary of the Yamaha Corporation founded in 1967. The company manufactures acoustic and electronic drum kits as well as percussion instruments, marching band equipment, and drum hardware.

== Production ==
Most of Yamaha's drums are manufactured at two different locations in Asia. Their factory in Osaka produces their high-end professional drums as well as all of their marching percussion. The research and development of new products also takes place there. Marketing is managed from the Yamaha Corp. headquarters in Hamamatsu. The factory in China produced the entry-level GigMaker kit and the intermediate-kit Stage Custom Birch. Their factory in Indonesia produces the Tour Custom series. The Indonesian factory uses the same machinery and techniques in their drum shells and all of the craftsmen working there are trained by Japanese craftsmen from the Osaka site. The only difference between these two plants is that the Osaka plant uses the more exclusive woods (maple, birch and oak)

== Acquisition of Premier ==
In 1987, Yamaha acquired the Premier Percussion factory in England in an attempt to establish the Yamaha name in the tougher European market. Yamaha placed machinery and trained the Premier craftsmen in the "Yamaha-way" of making drums, resulting in Premier producing a large number of Yamaha drums "made in England." In 1992, Yamaha withdrew and sold their stock shares back to Premier.

== See also ==
- John B. Riley
- Yamaha DTX series Wikipedia listing of Yamaha's electronic drum and percussion sets.
