= Akira Jimbo =

Japanese drummer

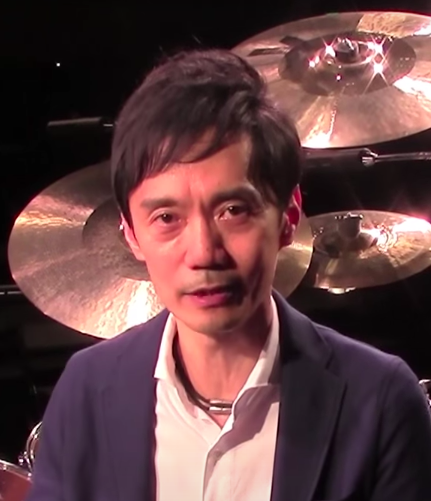
- Jimbo in 2015

Background information
- Born: February 27, 1959 (age 67); Tokyo, Japan
- Genres: Jazz fusion, electronic
- Occupation: Drummer
- Years active: 1979–present
- Spouse: Undisclosed (m. 1984)
- Website: akira-jimbo.uh-oh.jp

Akira Jimbo, also transliterated as Akira Jinbo (神保 彰, Jinbo Akira; born February 27, 1959), is a Japanese jazz fusion drummer, best known as the drummer for the Japanese jazz fusion band Casiopea in 3 separate stints (1980-1989, 1997-2006 and 2012-2022). Aside from his work with Casiopea, Jimbo has also participated in side projects with Keiko Matsui, Shambara, and Brian Bromberg.

== Background ==
Akira Jimbo began drumming at the age of 18 when he joined the Keio University Light Music Society Big Band alongside future T-Square's keyboardist Hirotaka Izumi. He became a member of Casiopea in 1980. During his solo career, he formed Jimsaku, a duo consisting of himself and Casiopea's bassist Tetsuo Sakurai in 1989. He has also worked with Hiroyuki Noritake from T-Square in the drum duo Synchronized DNA.

Jimbo uses a hybrid drumming style, combining elements of acoustic and electronic percussion, which is best demonstrated in his drum videos and at his drum clinics. By using the DTX drum triggering system, he is able to play fully orchestrated songs without a backing track. Prior to implementing that, his orchestrations had been arranged by American composer Gary Stockdale. Jimbo has assisted in the design of K Custom Hybrid Series of cymbals by Zildjian. His drum hero is Steve Gadd.

In 1999, he won second place in the British drum magazine RHYTHM for most popular drummer. In June 2000, he became the first Asian drummer to be featured on the cover of Modern Drummer magazine. He appeared in the Modern Drummers Festival in 2000.

== Drum setup ==
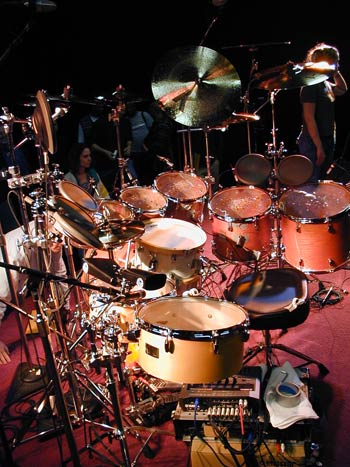
One of Akira Jimbo's many Yamaha drumsets, with his 2nd signature 13"x7" beech snare drum

One unique aspect of Jimbo's drumming is the setup of his drums. Using acoustic drums together with Yamaha electronic drum triggers, Jimbo is able to create a live performance with an array of different sounds. Apart from endorsing Yamaha drums and Zildjian cymbals, he also endorses Vic Firth drumsticks.

=== MIDI Drum Trigger System ===
Jimbo has claimed that every sound is triggered by himself as part of a live performance, which was true in the past, due to the limitations of the trigger system technology. As his career has progressed, however, he now uses various sequencing programs during some portions of his performances, such as during intense drum solos or particularly difficult arrangements.

=== Main Drum Kit Setup ===
Acoustic Drums

- Yamaha WSD13AJ (13"×7") Beech Custom Akira Jimbo Signature Snare Drum
- Yamaha YD9000AJ (8",10",12",14",16",22") Recording Custom Akira Jimbo debut 30th Anniversary Kit

Cymbals

- Zildjian K Custom Hybrid Series
  - 13.25" Hi-Hat
  - 17" Crash
  - 19" Trash Smash
  - 19" China
  - 21" Ride
  - 9" Splash
  - 13" Trash Splash/15" Trash Crash (stack)

Electronic Drum Trigger

- Yamaha DTX900

=== Past Equipment ===
Drum Sets

- 1980 – YD9000R
- 1983 to 1986 – Simmons SDSV
- 1990 – Yamaha Rock Tour Custom
- 1992 – Maple Custom
- 1995 – Yamaha Rock Tour Custom
- 1997 – Beech Custom
- 2001 – Beech Custom Absolute
- 2004 – Oak Custom Absolute
- 2005 – Oak Custom Akira Jimbo 25th anniversary
- 2010 – YD9000AJ Akira Jimbo 30th anniversary

Signature Snare Drums

- 1992 – MSD13AJ Maple 7ply Power Hoop (Limited)
- 1997 – WSD13AJ Beech 8ply Wood Hoop
- 2004 – NSD13AJ Oak 6ply Wood Hoop (Limited)
- 2012 – BSD1450AJ Old Birch 6ply Steel Hoop (Limited)

== Discography ==
=== Studio Albums - Solo ===
Year	Albums
1986	Cotton
1989	Palette
1990	Jimbo
1991	Slow Boat
1992	Penguin Parasol
1993	Lime Pie
1994	Panama Man
1995	Rooms by the Sea
1996	Flower
1997	Stone Butterfly
2007	Four Colors
2008	Get Up!
2009-09-02	Jimbomba
2010-02-10	Jimbo Gumbo
2011-01-12	Jimbo Jamboree
2012-01-17	Smile Smile
2013-01-09	Mind Scope
2014-01-08	Crossover the World
2014-01-14	Groove of Life
2016-01-01	Munity
2017-01-13	21
2018-01-01	22 South Bound
2018-01-01	23 West Bound
2019	24th Street NY Duo
2019	25th Avenue LA Trio
2019	26th Street NY Duo
2020	27th Avenue LA Trio

=== Cover albums ===
Year	Albums
2012-01-14	Jimbo de Cover
2013-01-09	Jimbo de Cover 2
2014-01-08	Jimbo de Cover 3
2015-01-07	Jimbo de CTI
2016-01-01	Jimbo de Jimbo 80's

=== Collaborations ===
Year	Albums
1994	Navel - as Jimsaku, with Tetsuo Sakurai
2000	Intelligent Jazz #1 - with Kay Nakayama

=== Compilations ===
Year	Albums
1994-06-25	Beach Picnics Vol.1 Instrumental
2010-02-10	Jimbest

=== Unit albums ===
Year	Albums			
	CASIOPEA			
1980	Thunder Live; Make Up City			
1981	Eyes of the Mind; Cross Point			
1982	Mint Jams; Four by Four			
1983	Photographs; Jive Jive			
1984	The Soundgraphy; Down Upbeat			
1985	Halle; Casiopea Live			
1986	Sun Sun			
1987	Casiopea Perfect Live II; Platinum			
1988	Euphony; Casiopea World Live '88			
	Shambara			
1989	Shambara			
	Jimsaku			
1990	Jimsaku			
1991	45 °C			
1992	Jade; Viva!			
1993	100%; Wind Loves Us			
1994	Navel			
1995	Blaze of Passion; Best Selection			
1996	Dispensation			
1997	Mega db			
	Casiopea	Nettai Tropical Jazz Big Band		
1997	Light and Shadows	Live in Yokohama		
1998	Be	II ~September~		
1999	Material	III ~My Favourite~		
			Intelligent JAZZ	
2000	20th(live); Bitter Sweet	IV ~La Rumba~	Intellijent Jazz #1	
2001	Main Gate	V ~La Noche Tropical~		
				ヒダじんぼ
2002	Inspire	VI ~En Vivo~; Live 2002 (DVD)	SkyandGround	Bridge
				JB Project
2003	Places	VII ~Spain~		Brombo!
2004	Marble; Live and More	VII ~The Covers~	Stevie is wonderful	Brombo! 2
				Synchronized DNA (DVDs)
2005	Gig25; Signal	IX ~Mas Tropical!~	Jazz Only Lives Twice	Double Drum Performance; Live Tour 2005
	Pyramid			
2005	Pyramid			
2006	Telepath	X ~Swing con Clave~; 10th Anniversary Live (DVD)	Stevie is wonderful More	Double Drum Performance 2
2007		XI ~Let's Groove~		Are You Synchronized?
2008		XII ~The Originals~		
2009		XII ~Fantasy~		
2010		XIII ~Liberty City~		
2011	Pyramid3			

=== Drums Lesson Series ===
Year	Title	Media
1992	Metamorphosis	VHS
1995	Pulse	VHS
1997	Independence	VHS
1999	Evolution	VHS
2003	Wasabi	DVD
2003	Fujiyama	DVD
2004	Solo Drum Performance ~One Man Orchestra~	DVD
2005	Solo Drum Performance 2 ~One Man Orchestra~	DVD
2006	Solo Drum Performance 3 ~One Man Orchestra~	DVD
2007	Solo Drum Performance 4 ~神保彰の作り方~	DVD
2008	Solo Drum Performance 5 ~Circuit Exercises~	DVD
2009	Solo Drum Performance 6 ~Offset Exercises~	DVD
2010	Solo Drum Performance 7 ~Shadow Exercises~	DVD
2011	Solo Drum Performance 8 ~Dotted Exercises~	DVD
