= Minoru Mukaiya =

Japanese musician (born 1956)

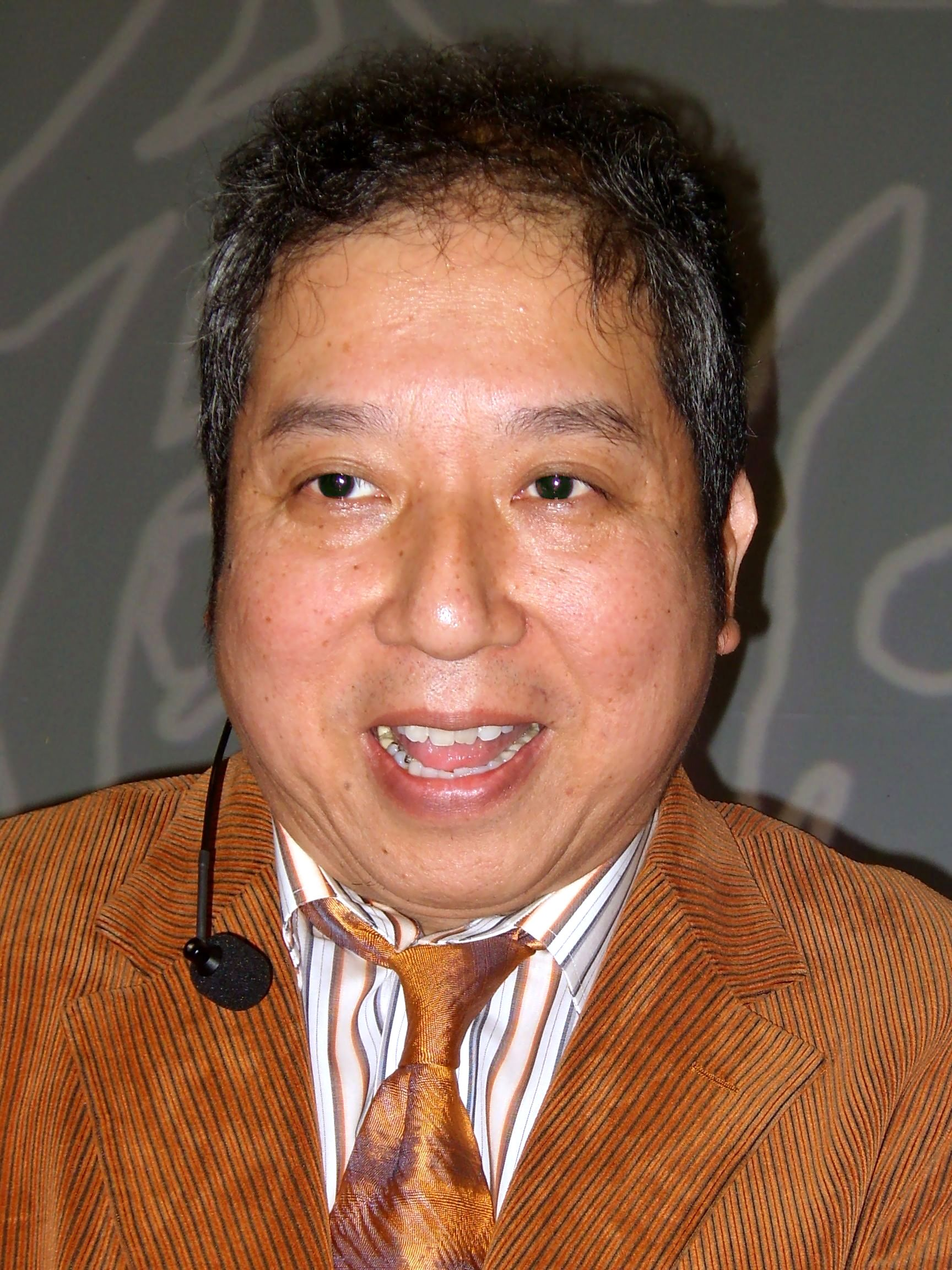
- Mukaiya in 2008

Background information
- Born: 20 October 1956 (age 69)
- Origin: Tokyo, Japan
- Genres: Jazz fusion, funk
- Occupations: Musician, businessman
- Instrument: Keyboards
- Years active: 1977—Present

Minoru Mukaiya (向谷 実, Mukaiya Minoru; born 20 October 1956) is a Japanese musician best known as the former keyboardist of the jazz fusion band Casiopea and producer of the Train Simulator series of Japanese video games.

Mukaiya joined Casiopea during its formation in 1977 (with guitarist Issei Noro, drummer Takashi Sasaki and bassist Tetsuo Sakurai) and remained in the group until their hiatus in 2006. Since leaving the band he has created his own musical production team, "Mukaiya Club." He also serves as the president and CEO of the company Ongakukan, which produces professional train simulators for Japanese transit systems and has distributed video games to the general public.

Mukaiya has also appeared in the event of Nico Nico Douga.

Mukaiya has composed around 200 distinct melodies for over 110 subway stations in Japan. In 2019, British television presenter James May interviewed Mukaiya for episode 3 of James May: Our Man in Japan, discussing Mukaiya's involvement in composing melodies for train stations. In episode 11 of Great Japanese Railway Journeys, broadcast in April 2026, Mukaiya was interviewed by Michael Portillo and a figure of about 300 melodies was given by Mukaiya.

== Discography ==
=== Solo works ===
- Welcome to The Minoru's Land (1985)
- Tickle The Ivory (1993)
- Sega Rally 2: Rearrange Album (1999)

== Other ==
- Announcement chime in the trains of the Kyushu Shinkansen (2004)
- Departure music at the major stations operated by Keihan Electric Railway in the Kansai region (June 2007)
- Approaching music and departure music at the major stations operated by Hanshin Electric Railway in the Kansai region (January 2009)
- Announcement chime and horn melody of the new Keisei AE trains being built for Keisei Electric Railway's Skyliner (2009)
- Announcement chime for the Tokyu Toyoko Line Shibuya Terminal's last two weeks of operation from 1 March 2013 until 15 March 2013, "Final Approach".
- Departure melody for the Tokyu Toyoko Line shared terminal with the Tokyo Metro Fukutoshin Line starting from 16 March 2013, "Departing from New Shibuya Terminal".
- On-board announcement chime for the Seibu Railway Fifty-two Seats of Happiness train operating since April 2016
