= Casiopea =

Japanese jazz fusion band

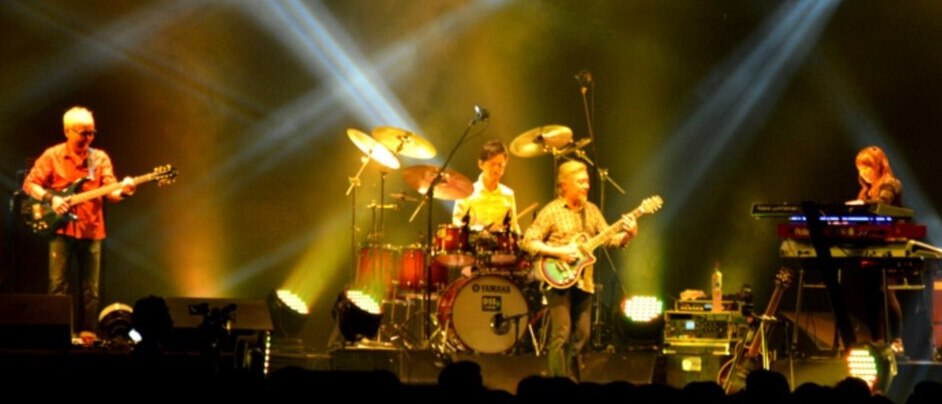
- Casiopea (as Casiopea 3rd) performing at the 21st Economics Jazz in Indonesia, 2015

Background information
- Also known as: Casiopea 3rd (2012–2022); Casiopea-P4 (2022–2025)
- Origin: Tokyo, Japan
- Genres: Jazz fusion; jazz-funk; smooth jazz; city pop
- Years active: 1976–2006; 2012–present
- Labels: Alfa; Polydor; Pioneer; Pony Canyon; Hats Unlimited
- Members: Issei Noro; Yoshihiro Naruse; Yoshinori Imai; Jun Abe
- Past members: Hidehiko Koike; Tetsuo Sakurai; Toru Suzuki; Minoru Mukaiya; Takashi Sasaki; Akira Jimbo; Masaaki Hiyama; Noriaki Kumagai; Kiyomi Otaka
- Website: casiopea.co.jp

Casiopea (カシオペア, Kashiopea) is a Japanese jazz fusion band formed in 1976 by guitarist Issei Noro and bassist Tetsuo Sakurai. After lineup changes the following year that added keyboardist Minoru Mukaiya, Casiopea made their major‑label debut with their self‑titled album in 1979, and drummer Akira Jimbo joined in 1980.

During this period, they released more than a dozen albums before Sakurai and Jimbo left the band amid disputes over concurrent band memberships. In 1990, bassist Yoshihro Naruse and drummer Masaaki Hiyama joined, resulting in a second era marked by multiple drummer changes, with Jimbo returning as a supporting member in 1997. Noro suspended all band activities in 2006, leading to a six-year hiatus.

In 2012, the band resumed activities with Mukaiya not rejoining and Kiyomi Otaka replacing him on keyboards. Renamed Casiopea 3rd for its third period, the group recorded its first album in eight years. After Jimbo left again in 2022, he was replaced by drummer Yoshinori Imai and the band entered its fourth period as Casiopea‑P4. Otaka left in 2025 and was replaced by keyboardist Jun Abe, and the band reverted to its original name.

== History ==
=== 1976–1989: First period ===
==== 1974–1976: Early activities ====
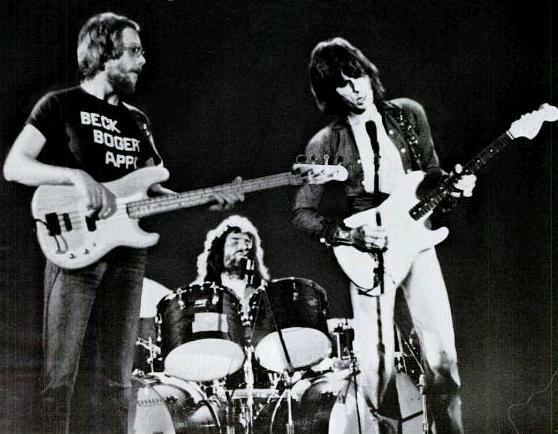
The band was formed attempting to emulate Beck, Bogert & Appice (pictured in 1973), before transitioning to an instrumental sound.

In 1974, guitarist Issei Noro, a third-year student at Tokyo Metropolitan Tamagawa High School, and bassist Tetsuo Sakurai, a second-year at Keio Shiki Senior High School, met through a mutual friend and quickly became friends. The three began rehearsing together at a studio in Tokyo, aiming to emulate Beck, Bogert & Appice with a hard rock and funk-based sound. Occasionally, they included a vocalist in their band, but the core members, Noro and Sakurai, were flexible in their musical approach, causing the band's direction to gradually shift towards instrumental music with jazz elements.

==== 1976–1980: Debut and first albums ====
Even though the band had been formed, the only two consistent members were Noro and Sakurai, leading them to use different names for each live show they performed. However, during an interview with a magazine, they were informed that the interview could not be published unless they had an official band name. Upon returning home, Noro consulted his mother, who suggested they choose a constellation. After opening a book on constellations, he selected Cassiopeia. However, when the band decided to adopt the name, the English version differed from the formal romanization. After being renamed Casiopea, Noro and Sakurai were joined by keyboardist Hidehiko Koike and drummer Tohru "Rika" Suzuki. In 1976, the band entered the amateur band contest EastWest, sponsored by the Yamaha Corporation. In that contest, Noro won the Best Guitarist award, and the band advanced to the finals. However, after their first contest, Koike and Suzuki left the band to pursue commitments with other bands.

To replace Koike, Noro recruited Minoru Mukaiya, who was studying at Nemun Music Academy (now Yamaha Conservatory of Music) who was connected through a mutual friend. To fill the drummer position left by Suzuki, the band held auditions, resulting in the recruitment of Takashi Sasaki. They entered EastWest the following year, where the band won the Best Group award and Noro again won Best Guitarist. Yoshihiro Naruse, who would later join the band, was a judge during the contest and praised them, even asking for an encore despite it being a competition. As a result of their popularity, their demo tape caught the attention of Alfa Records, leading to Casiopea's debut in 1979.

Casiopea debuted with their self-titled album on May 25, 1979. Noro was able to participate in the recording and production, with American recording engineer Al Schmitt, who had just arrived in Japan, serving as the engineer. Composer Jun Fukamachi, who was with Alfa and working on the album, went to New York City for the recording of Jun Fukamachi & The New York All Stars Live. Through this connection, they were able to have the Brecker Brothers and David Sanborn contribute to the album.

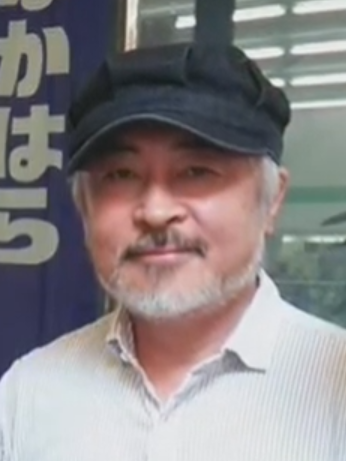
Guitarist Issei Noro

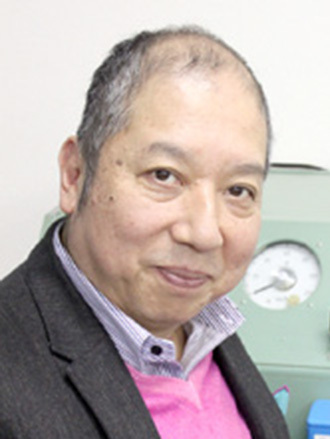
Keyboardist Minoru Mukaiya

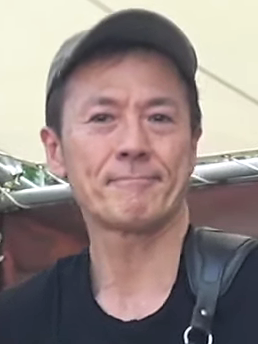
Bassist Tetsuo Sakurai

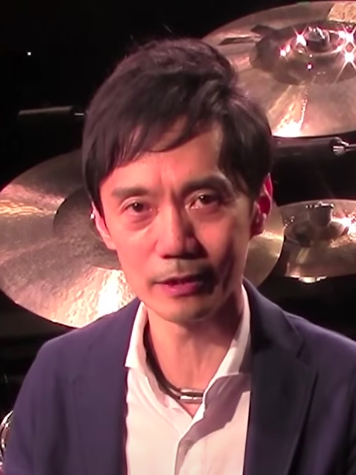
Drummer Akira Jimbo

The lineup of Casiopea from 1980 to 1989, during the band's heyday; Sakurai and Jimbo left in 1989 to form Jimsaku due to creative differences.

Later that same year, on 15 November 1979, they released their first single, "I Love New York," which was used by Japan Airlines for their New York campaign at the request of Alfa Records. They followed this with their second album, Super Flight, released on 25 November 1979, showcasing strong performances in both the single and the album. Their signature songs "Take Me" and "Asayake" were introduced for the first time in this album. However, due to differences in musical direction, Takashi Sasaki decided to leave the band, although he stayed on during the ensuing tour as they met drummer Akira Jimbo, a university student at Keio University.

==== 1980–1989: Lineup changes and heyday ====
Akira Jimbo met Tetsuo Sakurai when Sakurai stood in for Keio University's big band. Impressed by his talent, Sakurai recommended him as Casiopea's next drummer, with Jimbo's first recording with the group being the 1980 live album Thunder Live. Over approximately a decade, the band were successful both domestically and internationally while maintaining a stable lineup. Overseas audiences noted the group's incorporation of Japanese‑style melodies, and although the band initially targeted the U.S. market, songs made in Japan proved to resonate more strongly with international listeners.

In 1981, the band released Eyes of the Mind, produced by American drummer Harvey Mason, his first collaboration with the group, and it was their first album recorded in the United States. On 21 May 1982, they released Mint Jams, a live album compiled from performances recorded at Central Hall in Tokyo in February of that year. The album was selected as best album of 1982 by the Japanese jazz magazines Adlib and Jazzlife, with Tower Records Japan describing Mint Jams as a landmark in Japan's jazz‑fusion history and one of the band's career‑defining works. The band's albums began to attract attention overseas, prompting tours in the United States and Europe; guitarist Issei Noro credited Mint Jams with making their European tour possible. The members toured internationally and returned to Japan later that year to record 4×4 with international musicians including Lee Ritenour, Don Grusin, Nathan East, and Harvey Mason.

In 1989, Casiopea's contract with their record label ended and the band prepared to transfer to a new label, prompting a stop to band activities, including album production and national touring, as members pursued side projects. During the hiatus, Tetsuo Sakurai and Akira Jimbo formed Shambara, recording and touring with other musicians. Issei Noro and Minoru Mukaiya objected to their simultaneous membership in Shambara and Casiopea, arguing it would hinder Casiopea's planned restart. Sakurai and Jimbo insisted they could balance both bands, but after the dispute remained unresolved they left Casiopea and formed the duo Jimsaku.

=== 1990–2006: Second period and hiatus ===
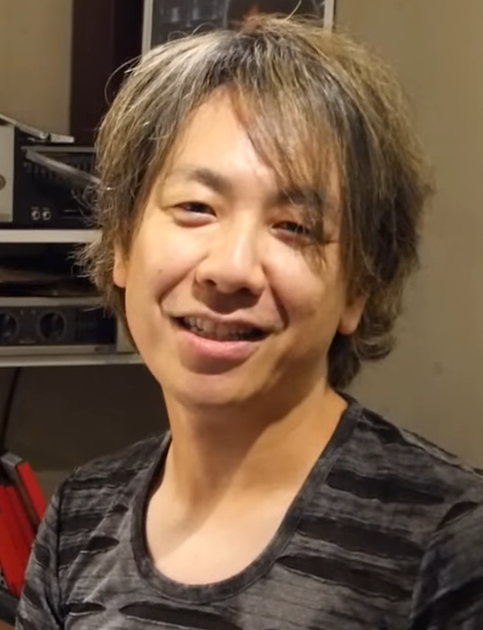
Noriaki Kumagai replaced Masaaki Hiyama as drummer from 1993 to 1996.

With only Issei Noro and Minoru Mukaiya remaining from Casiopea's original lineup, bassist Yoshihiro Naruse and drummer Masaaki Hiyama joined the group, replacing Sakurai and Jimbo, respectively. The band's second period became more experimental as the band sought to avoid stagnation, with Noro crediting Naruse's arrival with transforming the sound of the rhythm section. The band resumed live performances and touring in 1990, though Hiyama left two years later due to illness and was replaced by drummer Noriaki Kumagai. The band continued with this lineup from 1992 until 1996, when Kumagai departed and the band became a trio. Drummer Kozo Suganuma played with them for a time, but in 1997, Akira Jimbo returned as a supporting member, and by the following year, Jimbo had performed at all of their scheduled performances.

By the late 1990s, the members had begun pursuing solo projects. Mukaiya began producing a railway simulator as part of his train hobbies, Naruse worked as a member of the band Beast Kingdom, and Noro recorded his first solo album. Noro and Naruse discussed taking a hiatus from the music college where they both taught, due to the overwhelming demands on their time. In 2006, wanting to stop touring and play less with Casiopea, Noro decided to suspend all group activities, effectively putting the band on hiatus. He later commented that his activity in Casiopea had begun to take a toll on him because of the pressure to produce a large volume of songs in diverse styles. Although he considered disbanding the group, his management advised presenting the break as a hiatus in case of the band's resumption of activities.

=== 2012–2022: Return and third period (Casiopea 3rd) ===
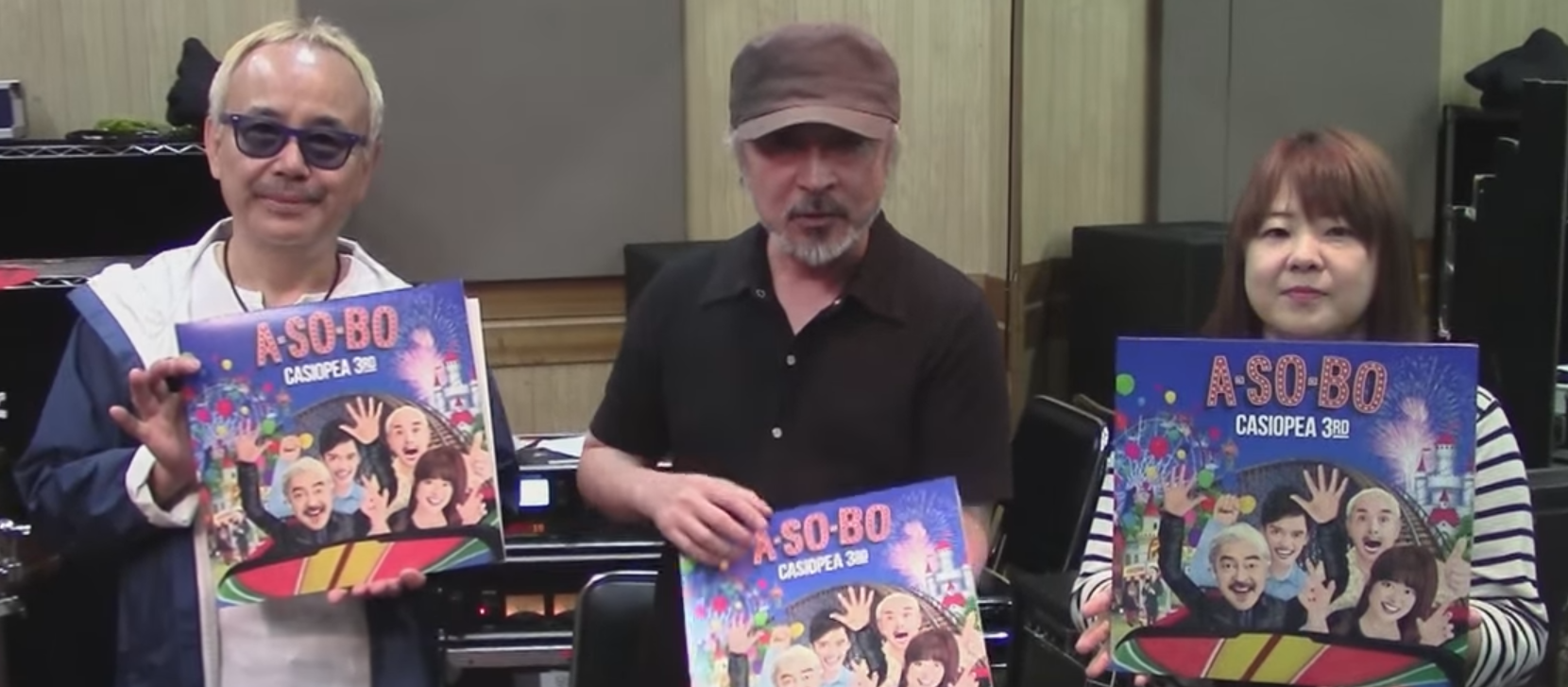
Casiopea 3rd members (Naruse, Noro, and Otaka) promoting the album A・So・Bo in 2015.

Although all the members were pursuing their own paths and Noro believed that the disbandment marked the end of Casiopea, the 2011 Tōhoku earthquake and tsunami inspired him to restart the band to uplift people's spirits through music in the wake of the disaster. In April 2012, Noro announced that Casiopea would be active again, although Minoru Mukaiya had left the band and was replaced by keyboardist Kiyomi Otaka. Alongside Noro and Otaka, bassist Yoshihiro Naruse and drummer Akira Jimbo rejoined the band; Jimbo was credited as a supporting member but treated as a full member. The band adopted the name Casiopea 3rd and also announced that they would perform for the first time since their hiatus at Tokyo Jazz 2012 and would be releasing their first best-of album. On 9 October 2013, they were appointed by the Japan Audio Society as an Ototen ambassador, the association’s first time naming one in recognition of its long-running contribution to the audio industry.

Throughout the 2010s, Casiopea 3rd resumed releasing albums, releasing Ta・Ma・Te・Box in 2013, their first in eight years, which reached number 18 on the Oricon Albums Chart and topped the jazz & classical chart. They released their second album, A・So・Bo, two years later. They would continue with I・Bu・Ki in 2016 and A・Ka・Ri in 2018. On 15 April 2020, Casiopea released the Blu-ray/DVD Celebrate 40th for their 40th anniversary, later embarking on the Casiopea 3rd Heartful Tour in October while also broadcasting online. In February 2022, Akira Jimbo announced that he would leave Casiopea 3rd; his final appearances were on the April and May 2022 Billboard Tour.

=== 2022–2025: Fourth period (Casiopea-P4) ===
In July 2022, Issei Noro announced that drummer Yoshinori Imai would replace Akira Jimbo and the band would be renamed from Casiopea 3rd to Casiopea-P4. They released their 35th album, New Topics, soon after, with Imai's younger age motivating the band to record for the first time in three years. They released their 36th album, Right Now, in 2024 to mark the band's 45th anniversary, with all members contributing compositions to the album, including an unreleased piece. In December 2024, prior to performances in Osaka and Tokyo, the band announced that they would be holding their final concert with Kiyomi Otaka as their keyboardist, as she chose to leave the band. A month prior to the final concert, the band had contacted pianist Jun Abe to see if he wanted to join as a replacement, which he accepted prior to the announcement.

=== 2025–present: Fifth period ===
In May 2025, Casiopea, now using their original first name, introduced Jun Abe as a member during a series of performances. Noro said in an interview with Daily Sports that he reverted to his original name after Otaka's decision to leave and to refresh the band's image. They released their 37th album, True Blue, under their original name on 27 August 2025.

== Musical style and influence ==
Upon the release of their self-titled album, the band was assigned the catchphrase "thrills, speed, super technique," which later became synonymous with their musicality and playing style. As the years progressed, Noro began incorporating more musicality into the band's pieces and reduced the emphasis on technique compared to their early years, largely due to the introduction of accurate music programs on computers. The band does not record demos, as Noro writes the charts and the members rehearse for a few weeks before recording. Final ideas are developed on the day of recording, as Noro felt demos constrained the music and preferred ideas made during group performance. According to The Nikkei, although many bands competed for attention during the fusion boom in Japan, Casiopea managed to secure lasting popularity through their technique and dynamic performances.

In Indonesia, Casiopea’s influence helped spark a brief jazz fusion boom marked by the formation of several jazz-rock and fusion groups, including Krakatau, Karimata, and Emerald Band. The wave of fusion music played a key a role in shaping Indonesia’s burgeoning Pop Kreatif genre (referred to colloquially as Indonesian city pop) in the mid-1980s. Krakatau and Casiopea once matched at the same stage at the 21st Economics Jazz at Gadjah Mada University. Another example of Casiopea’s impact was the formation of the jazz-fusion ensemble Indonesia 6, which drew extensively from the band’s musical style.

== Band members ==
=== Current members ===
- Issei Noro (野呂 一生) – guitar (1976–2006; 2012–present)
- Yoshihiro Naruse (鳴瀬 喜博) – bass (supporting 1977–1979; 1990–2006; 2012–present)
- Yoshinori Imai (今井 義頼) – drums (2022–present)
- Jun Abe (安部 潤) – keyboards (2025–present)

=== Former members ===
- Hidehiko Koike (小池 秀彦) – keyboards (1976)
- Tetsuo Sakurai (櫻井 哲夫) – bass (1976–1989)
- Toru Suzuki (鈴木 徹) – drums (1976)
- Minoru Mukaiya (向谷 実) – keyboards (1977–2006)
- Takashi Sasaki (佐々木 隆) – drums (1977–1979)
- Akira Jimbo (神保 彰) – drums (1980–1989; supporting 1997–2006; supporting 2012–2022)
- Masaaki Hiyama (日山 正明) – drums (1990–1992)
- Noriaki Kumagai (熊谷 徳明) – drums (1992–1996)
- Kiyomi Otaka (大髙 清美) – keyboards (2012–2024)

=== Supporting members ===
- Yukoh Kusunoki (楠木 勇有行) – vocals (1986–1987)
- Kozo Suganuma (菅沼 孝三) – drums (1996–1997; died 2021)

== Discography ==
- Casiopea (1979)
- Super Flight (1979)
- Make Up City (1980)
- Eyes of the Mind (1981)
- Cross Point (1981)
- 4x4 (1982)
- Photographs (1983)
- Jive Jive (1983)
- Down Upbeat (1984)
- Halle (1985)
- Sun Sun (1986)
- Platinum (1987)
- Euphony (1988)
- The Party (1990)
- Full Colors (1991)
- Active (1992)
- Dramatic (1993)
- Answers (1994)
- Freshness (1995)
- Flowers (1996)
- Light and Shadows (1997)
- Be (1998)
- Material (1999)
- Bitter Sweet (2000)
- Main Gate (2001)
- Inspire (2002)
- Places (2003)
- Marble (2004)
- Signal (2005)
- Ta・Ma・Te・Box (2013)
- A・So・Bo (2015)
- I・Bu・Ki (2016)
- A・ka・ri (2018)
- Panspermia (2019)
- New Topics (2022)
- Right Now (2024)
- True Blue (2025)
