= Yamaha DTX series =

Electronic drum and percussion kits

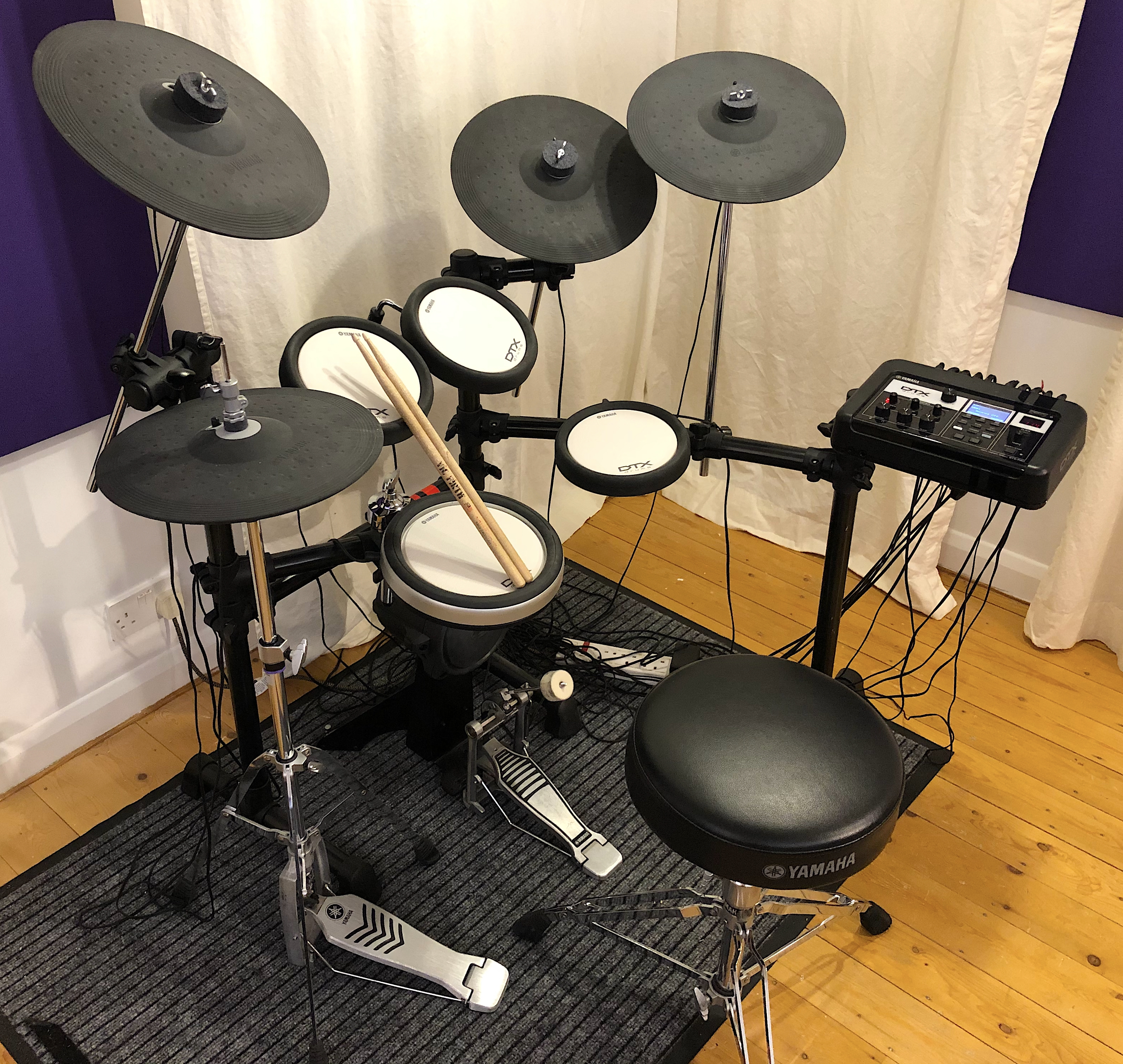
Yamaha DTX6K3-X kit with DTX PRO module

The Yamaha DTX series is a range of electronic drum kits and percussion controllers manufactured by the Yamaha Corporation. They currently cover levels from beginner to professional. DTX kits use sampling for their sounds, meaning each kit has built-in digital recordings of real drums, and cymbals. When the drum or cymbal pads are hit, the digital recordings (or samples) are played back to replicate what is being played.

On all kits, the sounds are editable – the pitch can be made higher or lower (tuned) and many other features. The higher the range of the DTX, the more functions there are editable.

== Products ==
- DTX hybrid pack including sound module, triggers, pads, cables, mounting hardware
- DTXTREME III drum trigger module
- DTX-MULTI12 electronic percussion pad, a split-level multi-pad with built-in sounds that allows users to add new digital sounds and samples; can be played using sticks, hands, or fingers, and used to program MIDI drums
- DTX-502 drum trigger module with an iOS app, sample import, and 250 more sounds than the previous version from Yamaha; the first to include drum and cymbal samples that VST developers optimized for DTX
- DTX-400K, the quietest kit made by Yamaha as of 2015
- DTX-80 drum pad
