= Wave (T-Square album) =

Studio album by T-Square
- Released: March 21, 1989
- Genre: Jazz fusion
- Length: 57:32

T-Square chronology
Yes, No (1988)	Wave (1989)	Natural (1990)

Wave is the fourteenth studio album by Japanese jazz fusion band T-Square. It was released on March 21, 1989.

== Name of the Band ==
From 1978 to 1986, their music would strictly be released domestically, to their home country of Japan, under the band name, The Square.

In December 1987, The Square opened for Hiroshima during their tour, supporting the Go album. This caught the ear of an Epic Records executive, and Truth was the first to release in the United States and United Kingdom. To avoid confusion with other bands with similar names, only the U.S. and U.K. release refers to the band as T-Square.

Their 1988 release, Yes, No, had only been released in Japan, and thus retained their old name of The Square, though they performed and toured in the United States as T-Square that same year.

At some point between this tour and the release of Wave, the decision was made to fully change the name of the band. As a result, Wave was the first studio album by the band to be released under the name T-Square, in no uncertain terms.

== Track listing ==
All music is composed by Masahiro Andoh, except where noted.

No.	Title	Music	Length
1.	"Morning Star"		6:20
2.	"Love for Spy"		5:10
3.	"Jealousy"		5:43
4.	"Your Christmas"		4:48
5.	"Route 405"	Hirotaka Izumi	5:19
6.	"Dooba Wooba!!"	Hiroyuki Noritake & Mitsuru Sutoh (ja)	2:07
7.	"Big City"		5:37
8.	"Still I Love You"		6:22
9.	"Hard-Boiled"		4:55
10.	"Arcadia"		4:47
11.	"Rachael"	Hirotaka Izumi	6:24

== See also ==
- 1989 in Japanese music
