= Adventures (album) =

Studio album by T-Square
- Released: April 1, 1984
- Genre: Jazz fusion
- Length: 39:49
- Label: Sony Music Entertainment Japan

T-Square chronology
The Water of the Rainbow (1983)	Adventures (1984)	Stars and the Moon (1984)

Adventures is the eighth studio album by Japanese jazz fusion band T-Square, then known as The Square. It was released on April 1, 1984.

Released before T-Square would have some of its members, themselves, go on to write and record music for video games (such as Mario Kart 8, both the Arc The Lad and Gran Turismo franchises), this album served as inspiration for game composers at the time of its release. It features the track "Sister Marian", which has been noted for its similarities to the Super Mario Bros. theme composed by Koji Kondo for the 1985 video game Super Mario Bros.; in a 2001 interview, Kondo cited T-Square as an influence on his compositions. The album also features "Travelers", which inspired Guile's Theme from the 1991 game, Street Fighter II. While this album set the tone for video-game music then-to-come, it also drew inspiration from western pop music, with "Jubilee" sharing a similar groove to The Jacksons' "Shake Your Body (Down to the Ground)".

== Track listing ==
No.	Title	Music	Length
1.	"Adventures (Prologue)"	Masahiro Andoh	1:33
2.	"All About You"	Masahiro Andoh	3:32
3.	"Night Dreamer"	Masahiro Andoh	6:08
4.	"Sister Marian"	Masahiro Andoh	4:44
5.	"Rodan"	Toyoyuki Tanaka	3:26
6.	"Jubilee"	Masahiro Andoh	4:51
7.	"Cape Light"	Hirotaka Izumi	6:38
8.	"Travelers"	Hirotaka Izumi	5:07
9.	"Adventures (Epilogue)"	Masahiro Andoh	3:50

== Personnel ==
=== The Square ===
- Masahiro Andoh: Electric and acoustic guitars
- Takeshi Itoh: Alto saxophone, Lyricon
- Hirotaka Izumi: Piano, synthesizers
- Toyoyuki Tanaka: Electric bass and Synth-bass (on Jubilee)
- Tohru Hasebe: Drums

=== Additional personnel ===
- Keiko Yamakawa: Harp
- Kanesaki Group: Horns
- Strings by the Nakanishi Ensemble

== See also ==
- 1984 in Japanese music
