= Yes, No =

Studio album by T-Square
- Released: February 26, 1988
- Recorded: Los Angeles · Mad Hatter Studios; Tokyo · CBS Sony Shinanomachi Studio
- Genre: Jazz fusion
- Length: 49:17
- Label: Columbia Records

T-Square chronology
Truth (1987)	Yes, No (1988)	Wave (1989)

Yes, No is the thirteenth studio album by Japanese Jazz fusion band T-Square. It was released on February 26, 1988 through Columbia Records and was the last studio album by the band released under the name The Square, though by this point they were already Touring the United States as T-Square.

== Background ==
The first track on this album, Dans Sa Chambre, was used as the theme song for the Japanese talk show Time 3, aired on Fuji TV and its affiliates. It was also used as the opening theme for the news show Businessman News, shown on TV Tokyo. The second track on the album, Go For It was used to advertise for the 1990 Toyota Sera.

== Rerelease and live recordings ==
On November 21, 2001, Village Records rereleased Yes, No on CD and DSD formats.

The album was included in the T-Square 35th Anniversary THE BOX 2013 box set.

Mr. Mellow was performed on the Megalith live album. Miss You was included in the Wordless Anthology V compilation album and performed live on the Megalith, Miss You In New York and T-Square Live (Featuring F-1 Grand Prix Theme) live albums. Crisis and Go For It was included on the F-1 Grand Prix compilation album. Papillon was rearranged and performed on the Miss You In New York live album.

== Track listing ==
All music is composed by Masahiro Andoh, except where noted.

No.	Title	Music	Length
1.	"Dans Sa Chambre"		5:26
2.	"Go For It"		4:53
3.	"Miss You"		5:02
4.	"El Mirage"	Hirotaka Izumi	5:19
5.	"Shadow"	Mitsuru Sutoh (ja)	5:51
6.	"Mr. Mellow"	Hirotaka Izumi	5:03
7.	"Kiss"		4:14
8.	"Papillon"		3:46
9.	"Crisis"		4:45
10.	"Catcher In The Rye"	Hirotaka Izumi	4:58

== Personnel ==
The Square

- Hirotaka Izumi - keyboards, synthesizer and programmable synthesizer
- Hiroyuki Noritake - drums
- Masahiro Andoh - guitar and programmable synthesizer
- Mitsuru Sutoh - bass
- Takeshi Itoh - alto saxophone and EWI

Additional Musicians

- Tatsuji Yokoyama - percussion (4,5)
- Toshihiro Nakanishi Group - strings (1,10)
- Charles Loper - trombone (1,2,3,4)
- Daniel Higgins - tenor saxophone, flute (1,2,3,4)
- Gary Grant - trumpets, flugelhorn (1,2,3,4)
- Jerry Hey - trumpets, flugelhorn (1,2,3,4)

== See also ==
- 1988 in Japanese music
