= R.E.S.O.R.T. =

Studio album by T-Square
- Released: April 1, 1985
- Genre: Jazz fusion
- Length: 39:44
- Label: Columbia Records

T-Square chronology
Stars and the Moon (1984)	R.E.S.O.R.T. (1985)	S.P.O.R.T.S. (1986)

R.E.S.O.R.T. (stylized as R•E•S•O•R•T) is the tenth studio album by Japanese Jazz fusion band T-Square, who was then called The Square. It was released on April 1, 1985 under Columbia Records. This was the last studio album with drummer Tohru Hasebe, who would leave the band after the tour (and the band's second live video album The Square Live that same year). Hiroyuki Noritake would replace him in the next album. The album has also been released on Laserdisc.

== Track listing ==
No.	Title	Music	Length
1.	"Omens of Love"	Hirotaka Izumi	4:07
2.	"Feel Alright"	Masahiro Andoh	4:32
3.	"Chances"	Masahiro Andoh	4:06
4.	"Stimulator"	Toyoyuki Tanaka	1:23
5.	"We'll Never Have A Trouble"	Masahiro Andoh	5:21
6.	"In the Grid"	Masahiro Andoh	4:34
7.	"Merylu"	Hirotaka Izumi	5:02
8.	"Prime"	Masahiro Andoh	4:19
9.	"Forgotten Saga"	Hirotaka Izumi	6:20

== Personnel ==
T-Square

- Hirotaka Izumi - Keyboards
- Masahiro Andoh - Guitars
- Takeshi Itoh - Alto Saxophone, Lyricon
- Tohru Hasebe - Drums and Percussion
- Toyoyuki Tanaka - Electric and Synthesizer Bass

Additional musicians (on "Feel Alright", "Stimulator" and "In the Grid")

- Bill Reichenbach - Trombone, Bass Trombone
- Gary Grant - Trumpet, Flugelhorn
- Jerry Hey - Trumpet, Flugelhorn
- Larry Williams - Tenor Saxophone

== See also ==
- 1985 in Japanese music
