= S.P.O.R.T.S. =

Studio album by T-Square
- Released: March 5, 1986
- Recorded: October–December 1985
- Studio: CBS/Sony Shinanomachi Studio
- Genre: Jazz fusion
- Length: 45:11
- Producers: Yasohachi Itoh, Taku Kanazawa

T-Square chronology
R.E.S.O.R.T. (1985)	S.P.O.R.T.S. (1986)	Truth (1987)

S.P.O.R.T.S. (stylized as S•P•O•R•T•S) is the eleventh studio album by Japanese jazz fusion band T-Square, who was then known as The Square. It was released on March 5, 1986. This album is the first appearance of one of their most popular songs, "Takarajima" ("Treasure Island"), composed by Hirotaka Izumi, and is also the first studio appearance of first long-term drummer, Hiroyuki Noritake. Bassist Toyoyuki Tanaka later left the band after this album's tour, and would be replaced by Mitsuru Sutoh starting from the next album Truth. This is their first album to win a Japan Gold Disc Award.

== Track listing ==
Sources

- All songs published by CBS/Sony Music.

No.	Title	Music	Length
1.	"Love Is In My Sight"	Masahiro Andoh	4:09
2.	"Love All"	Takeshi Itoh	4:24
3.	"Hit And Run"	Masahiro Andoh	3:57
4.	"Leave Me Alone"	Hirotaka Izumi	5:35
5.	"Overhead Kick"	Toyoyuki Tanaka	4:50
6.	"Drop Goal"	Masahiro Andoh	5:18
7.	"Takarajima"	Hirotaka Izumi	4:58
8.	"Camel Land"	Masahiro Andoh	5:23
9.	"Passage of Clouds (雲路)"	Takeshi Itoh	6:37

== Personnel ==
=== T-Square ===
- Masahiro Andoh: Electric and acoustic guitars
- Takeshi Itoh: Alto saxophone, Lyricon and Digital Takecon-1
- Hirotaka Izumi: Keyboards and synthesizers
- Toyoyuki Tanaka: Electric and synthesized bass
- Hiroyuki Noritake: Drums

=== Additional personnel ===
- Jake H. Concepcion: Saxophone on track 2
- Sumio Okada: Bass trombone on track 2
- Eiji Arai: Trombone on track 2
- Kenichiro Hayshi and Susumu Kazuhara: Trumpet on track 2

== Production ==
- Arranged by T-Square
- Produced by Yasohachi Itoh; assisted by Taku Kanazawa
- Recording engineers: Seigen Ono, Shingo Miyata
- Assisted by Hiroshi Irie, Yashuhiko Ohta and Yohji Kawanishi
- Mixed by Seigen Ono

== See also ==
- 1986 in Japanese music
