= Lucky Summer Lady =

Studio album by The Square
- Released: September 21, 1978
- Recorded: 1978
- Genre: Jazz fusion
- Length: 37:50
- Label: Sony Music Entertainment Japan

The Square chronology
Lucky Summer Lady (1978)	Midnight Lover (1978)

Lucky Summer Lady is the debut studio album by the Japanese jazz fusion group T-Square, who were then known as The Square. It was released on September 21, 1978.

== Track listing ==
All music is composed by Masahiro Andoh, except where noted.

No.	Title	Length
1.	"A Feel Deep Inside"	6:04
2.	"Lucky Summer Lady"	7:35
3.	"The Number"	5:08
4.	"Future Fly"	7:25
5.	"Love in a Dream (I Won't Last A Day Without You)" (music: Paul Williams/R. Nicols)	5:57
6.	"Before It's Gone Too Far"	6:22

== Recording personnel ==
Sources

- Masahiro Andoh - lead guitar
- Takeshi Itoh - alto and tenor saxophone, flute
- Junko Miyagi - piano, keyboards, vocals
- Akihiko Miyasaka - keyboards, vocals
- Shirō Sagisu - keyboards
- Kiyohiko Semba - percussion and vocals
- Yuhji Mikuriya - rhythm guitar
- Yuhji Nakamura - bass and Yamaha Synthesizer
- Michael S. Kawai - drums and percussion

== See also ==
- 1978 in Japanese music
