= Stars and the Moon =

Studio album by T-Square
- Released: December 1, 1984
- Genre: Jazz fusion
- Length: 42:49
- Label: Sony Music Entertainment Japan

T-Square chronology
Adventures (1984)	Stars and the Moon (1984)	R.E.S.O.R.T. (1985)

Stars and the Moon is the ninth studio album by Japanese jazz fusion band T-Square, who were then known as The Square. It was released on December 1, 1984.

== Track listing ==
No.	Title	Music	Length
1.	"Itoshi no Unaji"	Daisaku Kume	5:05
2.	"Maybe I'm Wrong"	Takeshi Itoh	4:45
3.	"Cry For The Moon"	Hirotaka Izumi	6:48
4.	"Mistral"	Hirotaka Izumi	4:47
5.	"Destination"	Masahiro Andoh	5:36
6.	"Overnight Sensation"	Masahiro Andoh	4:55
7.	"Mist of Time"	Masahiro Andoh	5:45
8.	"Enrai (遠雷)"	Hirotaka Izumi	5:08

== See also ==
- 1984 in Japanese music
