= Truth (T-Square album) =

Studio album by T-Square
- Released: April 1, 1987
- Genre: Jazz fusion

T-Square chronology
S.P.O.R.T.S. (1986)	Truth (1987)	Yes, No (1988)

Truth is the twelfth studio album by Japanese jazz fusion band T-Square, known at the time of the album's release as The Square. It was released on April 1, 1987.

Following the success and Japan Gold Disc Award win of their previous album, S.P.O.R.T.S., Truth marked the debut of their group's new bassist, Mitsuru Sutoh. Fuji TV used the title song as the theme for their Formula One broadcasts in Japan from 1987 to 1998.

This was the band's first album to release in the United States and Canada under the Sony sublabel, Portrait Records, and in the United Kingdom under Epic Records. Another band in the U.S. had named themselves The Square or The Squares or something similar, leading this album to be released by "T-Square" - complete with their logo of a red square with a capital T.

== Tracks ==
All music is composed by Masahiro Andoh, except where noted.

No.	Title	Music	Length
1.	"Grand Prix"		2:39
2.	"Celebration"		4:44
3.	"Beat In Beat"		5:00
4.	"Unexpected Lover"		5:25
5.	"Truth"		4:17
6.	"Breeze And You"	Hirotaka Izumi	4:42
7.	"Giant Side Steps"	Takeshi Itoh	5:32
8.	"Because"		4:51
9.	"Twilight In Upper West"	Hirotaka Izumi	5:21

== See also ==
- 1987 in Japanese music
