= Temptation of Shapely Legs =

Studio album by T-Square
- Released: November 21, 1982
- Genre: Jazz fusion
- Length: 39:24

T-Square chronology
Magic (1981)	Temptation of Shapely Legs (1982)	The Water of the Rainbow (1983)

Temptation of Shapely Legs (脚線美の誘惑, Kyakusenbi no Yuhwaku) is the sixth studio album by Japanese jazz fusion band T-Square, who was then known as The Square. It was released on November 21, 1982. This is also the first T-Square album to have a Japanese name, whereas the previous names were in English.

This was the first album from The Square to feature keyboardist Hirotaka Izumi, and drummer Tohru Hasebe, taking over from Daisaku Kume and Eiji Shimizu respectively. This lineup would remain until 1985.

== Track listing ==
All music is composed by Masahiro Andoh, except where noted.

No.	Title	Length
1.	"ハワイへ行きたい (Hawaii e Ikitai/I want to go to Hawaii)"	4:38
2.	"The Rest Of A Romance"	4:45
3.	"脚線美の誘惑 (Kyakusenbi no Yuwaku)"	4:27
4.	"Hearts"	6:02
5.	"Love's Still Burnin'"	4:44
6.	"Change Your Mind" (Music: Daisaku Kume)	4:12
7.	"Between" (Music: Toyoyuki Tanaka)	1:20
8.	"Full Circle"	4:31
9.	"Memories Of Alice" (Music: Hirotaka Izumi & Takeshi Itoh)	4:45

== See also ==
- 1982 in Japanese music
