= T-Square (band) =

Japanese jazz fusion band

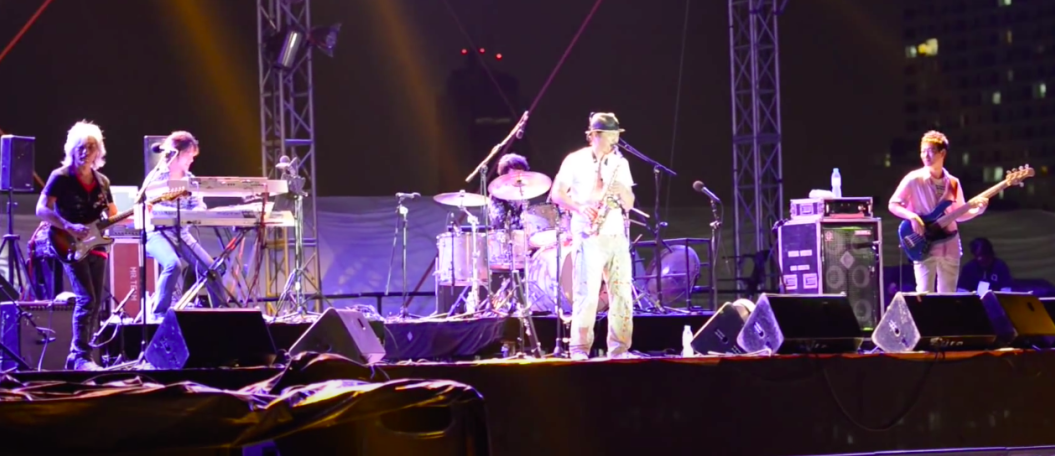
- T-Square performing at Asiatique in 2012.

Background information
- Origin: Tokyo, Japan
- Genres: Jazz fusion; instrumental rock; smooth jazz; pop rock; city pop
- Years active: 1976–present
- Labels: CBS/Sony (1978–1991); Sony Records (1991–2000); Village Music (2000–2015); Orange Lady (2015–present); T-Square Music Entertainment (2016–present)
- Members: Takeshi Itoh; Satoshi Bandoh (ja); Shingo Tanaka (ja); Yuichi Hasegawa (ja); Shuya Kameyama (ja)
- Past members: Masahiro Andoh; Yuhji Nakamura; Junko Miyagi (ja); Michael S. Kawai (ja); Yuhji Mikuriya; Kiyohiko Semba (ja); Daisaku Kume (ja); Jun Aoyama (ja); Toyoyuki Tanaka (ja); Eiji Shimizu; Hirotaka Izumi; Tohru Hasebe (ja); Hiroyuki Noritake; Mitsuru Sutoh (ja); Masato Honda; Takahiro Miyazaki (ja); Tadashi Namba (ja); Keiji Matsumoto (ja); Keizoh Kawano
- Website: tsquare.jp

T-Square (stylized in all caps, formerly known as The Square) is a Japanese jazz fusion band formed in 1976. They became famous in the late 1970s and the 1980s alongside other Japanese jazz fusion bands such as Casiopea, Prism, and Naniwa Express, and are known for songs such as "Truth", "Japanese Soul Brothers", "Takarajima", and "Omens of Love", among others.

The band's initial name, "The Square", was printed on the front cover of their albums. After the renaming of the band to T-Square the imprint changed respectively (in all caps) and their typical logo became a capital letter "T" printed over a red square. The logo has been modified several times, reflecting the change of band names such as T-Square Alpha (where an α symbol was added to the logo) and T-Square Plus (where the text "plus" was added, centered next to the T in smaller letters).

"Truth" was used as the theme for Fuji Television's Formula One coverage from 1987 to 1998 and starting in 2012. Special arrangements of this song were used as the theme for Japan's F1 2001 to 2006. (Note: "Truth 21c" (2001–2002), "Truth Resonance-T Mix" (2003–2005), "Truth (20th Anniversary Version)" (2006).)

The band has won 12 Japan Gold Disc Awards. In the 1980s, S.P.O.R.T.S., Truth, Yes, No, and their F-1 Grand Prix World compilation album won Gold Discs in the "Jazz-Fusion" category. In the 1990s, Natural, Impressive, Human, Natsu no Wakusei, B.C. A.D., and Gravity all won Gold Discs. After more than two decades without Gold Discs, the band won back-to-back awards for 2021's Fly! Fly! Fly! and 2022's Wish as part of the "Instrumental Album of the Year" category.

== History ==
=== The Square (1976–1988) ===
In 1976, the Square started as a small jazz fusion group in Meiji University with a very basic line-up, made of bassist Yuhji Nakamura, guitarist Masahiro Andoh, pianist Jun Hakamazuka and drummer Shunichi Harada. According to Masahiro Andoh, the band's name was inspired by Madison Square Garden. Hakamazuka was replaced by Junko Miyagi on piano.

Meanwhile, in the Nihon University of the Arts, saxophonist Takeshi Itoh and Drummer Michael S. Kawai played in a few other college bands together. When those disbanded, Kawai became fast friends with Andoh, replacing Harada on drums within the Square, and Takeshi Itoh made many guest appearances with the band, officially joining on saxophone and flutes, in 1977.

With backing guitarist Yuhji Mikuriya, auxiliary-keyboardist Shiro Sagisu, and percussionist Kiyohiko Senba joining in 1978, the band was signed to CBS/Sony and released their first studio album, Lucky Summer Lady. It had a semi-generic, disco-type sound. The follow-up album, "Midnight Lover" was more melody-centric and its title track taking more of a Bossa-Nova approach. Their third album, "Make Me a Star", was their first album to count with guest musicians and saxophonist Takeshi Itoh adopted the Lyricon as a side instrument. The Square would then begin a tradition of writing one to three songs with the Lyricon in every new album thereafter. As the years progressed, the number of members had dwindled from eight members (two keyboardists, two guitarists, a drummer, a Percussionist, a sax player and a bassist) to five (a drummer, a keyboardist, a guitarist, a sax player and a bassist). The group's sound had also evolved to a more rock-oriented music when Junko Miyagi was replaced by Prism (ja) keyboardist Daisaku Kume and Michael S. Kawai was replaced by drummer Jun Aoyama (better known as Tatsuro Yamashita's support drummer from 1979 to 2003). The band would also have vocalists, with Rockoon being the first of two albums to prominently feature one. Jun Aoyama was later replaced by Eiji Shimizu on drums and Yuhji Nakamura was replaced by bassist Toyoyuki Tanaka in 1981. Tanaka's slap-bass influenced a tonal shift to the band.

In 1982, Tohru Hasebe replaced Shimizu and Hirotaka Izumi replaced Kume. Izumi eventually became the second longest-tenured keyboardist over 15 years in the band (1982–97). This would be the band's first consistent line-up, lasting until late 1985. Hiroyuki Noritake would then replace Hasebe on drums that same year as their first long-term drummer. By the end of 1986, Mitsuru Sutoh replaced Toyoyuki Tanaka on bass, being the first long-term bassist in the group. Takeshi Itoh would go on to swap his Lyricon – an instrument crafted in the 1970s with not many people to repair it – for a mass-produced Yamaha WX7, which he would further swap out for an EWI instead.

In an attempt to not confuse the Western Audience with a name that sounds too close to "The Squares", "Truth" was released in the United States and Canada through Portrait Records, a sister imprint of Columbia and Epic Records and a subsidiary of Sony Records. While this album's Japanese release still refers to the band as "the Square", Portrait Records' reprint would be the first to refer to them as "T-Square", and included the logo of a T and a Red Square later used in their albums.

Their first performance in the United States was at the Cat Club in New York City in December 1987 and it was released on Laserdisc early 1988, still as "the Square".

=== T-Square (1988–2000) ===
Their 1988 album, Yes, No was released in Japan only, with no Western reprint, and thus still referred to them as "the Square", but they performed at the Roxy in Los Angeles on November 3 that same year as "T-Square". This is the first concert to use the now-established T-Square logo onstage. In 1989, they released their first studio album, in no uncertain terms, now as "T-SQUARE", Wave. The band would also appear alongside Ottottrio (with guitarist Hirokuni Korekata) and Casiopea in The Super Fusion that same year. In 1990, saxophonist Masato Honda debuted with them as a backing saxophonist on the album T-Square Live (featuring F-1 Grand Prix Theme). By the end of 1990, Takeshi Itoh left the group to pursue a solo career in the US, and Honda replaced him in 1991. Honda also composed the opening track from T-Square's New-S album, "Megalith". Their second album with Honda, Impressive, begins with the song "Faces", which, like "Truth", came to be closely associated with Fuji TV broadcasts of Formula 1, more specifically, with Ayrton Senna's victories. After the release of the Blue in Red album in 1997, Honda left the group to pursue his solo career. Takahiro Miyazaki would replace him. At the same time, Hirotaka Izumi left T-Square and was replaced by Tadashi Namba. Namba played keyboards on the theme song from Gran Turismo, "Moon Over The Castle" (from Masahiro's solo album Andy's, released in 1996) as well as the T-Square arrangement of the song, called "Knight's Song", from Blue in Red. The group and all former and (at the time) current members played at Yaon de Asobu (Note: Yaon de Asobu (野音であそぶ) is the name used for T-Square live shows at the Hibiya Open-Air Concert Hall that began in 1991.) for their 20th anniversary that same year. At the end of 1998, Tadashi Namba was replaced by Keiji Matsumoto. The new line-up of Miyazaki, Noritake, Sutoh, Matsumoto and Andoh was kept until the group's brief disbandment in mid-2000.

=== Unit era (2000–2004) ===
In mid-2000, T-Square were split into two separate groups. The rhythm section of Sutoh, Noritake and Matsumoto performed as "Trio the Square". With Takahiro Miyazaki leaving his role as a sax player, Takeshi Itoh performed and recorded with Masahiro Andoh for the first time in a decade. The songs they wrote became their album, Friendship. This album wasn't released under Sony Records proper, but instead, under Village Records, a Sony Music imprint whose focus is on Jazz-Fusion. The album was recorded with Session players, but the Friendship Live performance had ex long-term drummer, Hiroyuki Noritake, along with support bassist Kiyoshi Murakami and keyboardist Keizoh Kawano, the latter of whom started in the band as a supporting member, eventually to become the longest tenured keyboardist over 20 years with T-Square. In 2001, T-Square formed a side project that pursued hard rock sounds, T-Square Plus. Fence of Defense guitarist Kenji Kitajima, former Seikima-II bassist Shunsuke "Xenon" Ishikawa and session keyboardist Takehiro Kawabe joined them briefly in 2002. After that, the band no longer used session musicians.

In 2003, T-Square released the album Spirits under their original name of "the Square", and retained some of their original members (partly due to T-Square's 25th anniversary that year) and kept their newcomer, Keizoh Kawano. The line-up was Itoh, Noritake, Sutoh, Kawano, Izumi and Andoh. They released another album, T Comes Back, that featured new arrangements of some of their best known songs.

=== Return to the band form (2004–2019) ===
In 2004, Keizoh Kawano became an official keyboardist, and Katsuji Morioka joined and replaced Mitsuru Sutoh on bass. Only a few months after the release of their album, "Groove Globe", Satoshi Bandoh replaced Hiroyuki Noritake on Drums. At the end of 2004, the group made a band form for the second time. In 2005, not long after the release of "Passion Flower", Morioka was replaced by Shingo Tanaka as support bassist, and they continued to turn with this lineup, seen in the "Passion Flower Live" DVD. T-Square's original drummer, Michael S. Kawai, returned as a behind-the-scenes percussionist and producer from 2004 to 2008. (Note: Percussionist in Groove Globe, Passion Flower, Blood Music, and Wonderful Days; producer in all five albums including 33.)

In order to promote their 30th anniversary, the band formed T-Square Super Band that combined their former and (at the time) current members. The line-up was Andoh, Itoh, Miyazaki, Tanaka, Sutoh, Izumi, Kawano, Noritake, and Bandoh. After the end of the Wonderful Days tour, the group added even more former members to form T-Square Super Special Band and played on Yaon de Asobu for their 30th anniversary show. This show was released in February 2009 as The Square ~ T-Square since 1978: 30th Anniversary Festival. Their 2009 album Discoveries was sold with a DVD which chronicled T-Square performing and rehearsing in 2008.

In 2010, T-Square released a brand new album, Jikan Ryoko (時間旅行). This album was meant to showcase more of the songwriting abilities of the younger members of the group. In the summer of that same year, T-Square rerecorded some of their older songs and released them in October as an album called Takara no Uta (宝曲), with T-Square Plays the Square as a subtitle.

T-Square released another album, Nine Stories, in April 2011. Some current and former T-Square members would tour with Satoshi Bandoh to promote his solo album, Happy Life!, in late 2011. T-Square recorded another T-Square Plays the Square album, Yume no Uta (夢曲) released in October 2011, much like the year prior. Keizoh Kawano recorded and released his own solo album, Dreams, in November. At the end of 2011, they performed a new song, "Bird of Wonder", which was released with their 2012 album Wings. The group later released another cover album in 2012, Niji no Uta (虹曲), this time employing the help of special guest musicians, such as jazz pianist Yosuke Yamashita.

T-Square again formed "T-Square Super Band" in promotion of their 35th anniversary. They retained all members of the Super Band from 2008, including percussionist Kiyohiko Semba and excluding pianist Hirotaka Izumi. A picture was included upon the release of the album Smile, reading something related to "Itoh's resignation", making fans believe that Takeshi Itoh would once again leave the band. Itoh only performed on two tracks of another 2013 album, History, but did not leave the band.

T-Square's 35th Anniversary Festival show (recorded at the Hibiya Open-Air Concert Hall on October 13, 2013, and the Festival Hall on October 15, 2013) was released on Blu-ray and DVD in May 2014. Nearly a month later, their album was released, Next.

The 40th T-Square album, Paradise, was released in July 2015, being one of ten T-Square albums (along with Lucky Summer Lady, Midnight Lover, Make Me a Star, Magic, Kyakusenbi no Yuuwaku (脚線美の誘惑), Stars and the Moon, S.P.O.R.T.S., Yes, No, and Friendship) not to be released in the spring. Paradise was the first T-Square album to be released on iTunes and Spotify in the United States, along with their following album from 2016, Treasure Hunter.

T-Square's 1982–1985 lineup continued a single concert after performing almost the year prior.

In 2017, T-Square performed two separate concerts at Blue Note Tokyo under the name "The Square Reunion". The first one included their 1982–1985 lineup of Masahiro Andoh, Takeshi Itoh, Tohru Hasebe, Toyoyouki Tanaka, and Hirotaka Izumi with Keizoh Kawano playing backing synth; the second one included their 1987–1990 lineup of Masahiro Andoh, Takeshi Itoh, Hiroyuki Noritake, Mitsuru Sutoh, and Hirotaka Izumi with Keizoh Kawano playing backing synth.

T-Square released the album REBIRTH in April 2017.

In 2018, T-Square released two albums, City Coaster in April and It's a Wonderful Life! in November, the latter under the name "T-Square and the Square Reunion". "It's a Wonderful Life!" was also the name of their 40th anniversary concert. This particular concert included a special guest appearance by the Nishiarai Junior High School Brass Band Club, who performed "Takarajima". This concert also included Daisaku Kume, who hadn't played with T-Square since their 20th anniversary in 1998.

=== Kawano and Andoh leave (2019–2021) ===
T-Square had planned to record their next album Horizon in Los Angeles, but on February 6, 2019, their keyboardist Keizoh Kawano was hospitalized due to an intracerebral hemorrhage which paralyzed the left side of his body. Due to the abrupt changes, the T-Square members were not free to travel to the U.S. to stay and record the album, so Philippe Saisse, who hadn't played with T-Square since the T-Square and Friends album Miss You in New York from 1995, but played on Satoshi Bandoh's album Step by Step! from 2016, offered to finish the keyboard parts. They managed to release Horizon in April 2019. The new formation, with Saisse replacing Kawano temporarily, was then called T-Square Alpha, indicating the name change also by adding an alpha sign to their logo, and they used this name while touring to promote Horizon in concerts.

T-Square scouted Akito Shirai as a session keyboardist. With both Shirai and Kawano providing synthesizer parts, the band recorded and released AI Factory to a two-month delay as a result of the COVID-19 pandemic. On October 28, 2020, T-Square released a new self-cover album titled Crème de la Crème, part of which includes a hand-picked collection of Keizoh Kawano's best songs. This was T-Square's last album with Kawano, who would continue activities such as working as a composer.

At some point during the end of 2020, T-Square's albums released prior to 2015 became available to all streaming services.

On February 1, 2021, Masahiro Andoh announced that he would leave T-Square after releasing their upcoming album (not yet named at the time) and completing their 2021 tour, wishing to continue activities as a solo guitarist. At the same time, after Masahiro Andoh's departure, Takeshi Itoh and Satoshi Bandoh announced they would form T-Square Alpha.

T-Square released the album Fly! Fly! Fly! in April 2021, which was awarded the Golden Disc Award 2022 for the instrumental album of the year by the Recording Industry Association of Japan (RIAJ).

On April 26, 2021, Hirotaka Izumi died suddenly due to acute heart failure. Accordingly, T-Square performed concerts of mostly Izumi-penned T-Square songs that month. They would continue to hold Izumi memorial concerts throughout 2022 until 2024. (Note: See T-Square news.)

T-Square toured to honor Masahiro Andoh's farewell in two concerts.

=== T-Square Alpha (2021–2024) ===
Guitarist Yuma Hara took Masahiro Andoh's spot at Blue Note Tokyo in October 2021.

T-Square's 2021 Year-End Special live shows saw Keiji Matsumoto perform for the first time since 2000.

On May 18, 2022, T-Square's 49th Album, Wish was released. This album marked the first time in close to 25 years that Masato Honda and Keiji Matsumoto recorded Studio Parts with T-Square. This album was also awarded the RIAJ's Golden Disc Award 2023 for Best Instrumental Album.

Masato Honda and Takahiro Miyazaki performed together in September 2022. With T-Square's "Year End" shows in December 2022, Masato Honda performed with the T-Square Alpha Lineup, herein referred to as T-Square Alpha X. This new formation indicated the name change also with the X in its name referring to the last letter in the term "Double Sax", and they used this name to promote their 45th anniversary.

On January 18, 2023, T-Square released a digital album of their live concert from December 31, 2021, and, on March 1, 2023, a digital album of their Concert Tour from July 3, 2022.

Their 50th studio album Vento de Felicidade was released on May 31, 2023. This album contains the song "Rooms with a View", the last T-Square song that Hirotaka Izumi wrote and participated in. This release was also commemorated with two concerts at Blue Note Tokyo in June.

The T-Square Alpha X Lineup performed on a Blue Note Tokyo special event titled Jazz Fusion Summit 2023 on July 17.

T-Square's 45th Anniversary Concert, held on October 21, 2023, in the Tokyo International Forum Hall A, included Kazumi Watanabe, Yuji Toriyama, the Nishiarai Junior High School Brass Band Club, and the Masato Honda Big Band Station as special guest performers. This concert also included Masato Honda, who, unlike Takeshi Itoh and Takahiro Miyazaki, hadn't participated in the anniversary concerts in 2003, 2008, 2013, and 2018. The booklet inside the Blu-ray/DVD release of this concert erroneously lists Miyazaki's instrument as an EWI instead of a Lyricon played in his actual performance.

T-Square's 2023 Year-End Special live shows saw two saxophonists (Itoh and Miyazaki or Honda) perform together in five days of concerts at Chicken George, and three saxophonists (Itoh, Honda, and Miyazaki) perform together in two days of concerts at the Nihonbashi Mitsui Hall, both for a second consecutive year.

Blue Note Tokyo's Jazz Fusion Summit continued in 2024, when Masato Honda and Kiyohiko Semba guest-performed with T-Square.

=== New T-Square (2023–present) ===
After their 45th anniversary concert, in an attempt to prolong the activities of the band, the T-Square Fans and Staff Facebook page made a post announcing that, in order to create more music and potentially celebrate a 50th anniversary and beyond, they were opening online auditions, seeking new band members and/or composers. The deadline was December 31, 2023.

Guitarist Shuya Kameyama and keyboardist Yuichi Hasegawa were elected as finalists. T-Square's audition was commemorated with two concerts at the Marunouchi Cotton Club in August 2024.

T-Square's 2024 Year-End Special live shows saw saxophonists Itoh and Honda perform together for a third consecutive year. When Shuya Kameyama was announced as the replacement of Kazuma Sotozono for five days of concerts at Chicken George, Sotozono reported feeling unwell; following a medical examination, he tested positive for influenza.

T-Square and the New Japan Philharmonic Orchestra performed together in March 2025. This joint concert, titled "Classics & Harmony", continued since 2026.

T-Square's 51st studio album Turn the Page was released on June 4, 2025. Yuichi Hasegawa and Shuya Kameyama became official members upon this release. Shingo Tanaka became an official member as well, after 20 years as a Support Bassist. Their former keyboardist, Keizoh Kawano, helped produce this album. It is the first T-Square album in which Takeshi Itoh played all his Windsynth parts on a NuRad instead of an EWI, though he already used the new instrument in several live performances prior to the release of the album.

T-Square's special project held at Blues Alley Japan, titled "The Square/T-Square Old Days Project", began in August 2025. This series of projects featured current members Yuichi Hasegawa and Shuya Kameyama alongside legacy members from various past lineups of the band. (Note: See T-Square news.)

Blue Note Tokyo's Jazz Fusion Summit continued again in 2025, when T-Square kept the lineup from the aforementioned album.

Each of the seven days of T-Square's 2025 Year-End Special live shows at Chicken George had different combinations of current and legacy members, and two days of concerts at the Nihonbashi Mitsui Hall also featured the lineup of all current members alongside Honda.

Blue Note Tokyo's Jazz Fusion Summit continued yet again in 2026, when T-Square kept the lineup from their album Voyage.

"Crossover Japan" will return in 2026 with Blue Note Tokyo as its sponsor, when Mitsuru Sutoh will be filling in for Shingo Tanaka. When this event was announced, Tanaka cited "various circumstances".

T-Square's 2026 Year-End Special live shows will feature a similar format to the previous year, with eight days of concerts at Chicken George featuring various combinations of current and legacy members, and two days of concerts at the Nihonbashi Mitsui Hall also featuring the lineup of all current members alongside Honda.

== Influence ==
T-Square's music, as well as the jazz fusion genre as a whole, heavily influenced video game music in the 1980s and 1990s. Most notably, Nintendo composer Koji Kondo would take inspiration from T-Square's "Sister Marian" from the 1984 album Adventures when composing "Ground Theme" for the 1985 platformer game Super Mario Bros. Many other video game series would later be rumored to have taken inspiration from T-Square music, including Street Fighter, Sonic the Hedgehog, and more.

Members of T-Square have also worked on video game music directly: Masahiro Andoh and Keizoh Kawano composed the soundtrack of Arc the Lad; Andoh and other T-Square members recorded songs for the Gran Turismo series for many years, including "Moon Over The Castle", the series' main theme; and in the 2010s and 2020s, T-Square members worked on the soundtracks for Mario Kart 8, Mario Kart 8 Deluxe and Mario Kart World.

== Members ==
=== Current members ===
- Takeshi Itoh – saxophones, EWI, NuRAD, flute (1977–1990, 2000–present)
- Satoshi Bandoh – drums (2004–present)
- Shingo Tanaka – basses (2025–present; supporting member 2005–2025)
- Yuichi Hasegawa – keyboards (2025–present; supporting member 2024–2025)
- Shuya Kameyama – guitars (2025–present; supporting member 2024–2025)

=== Saxophone ===
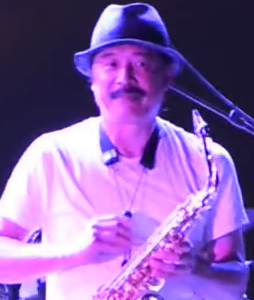
Takeshi Itoh

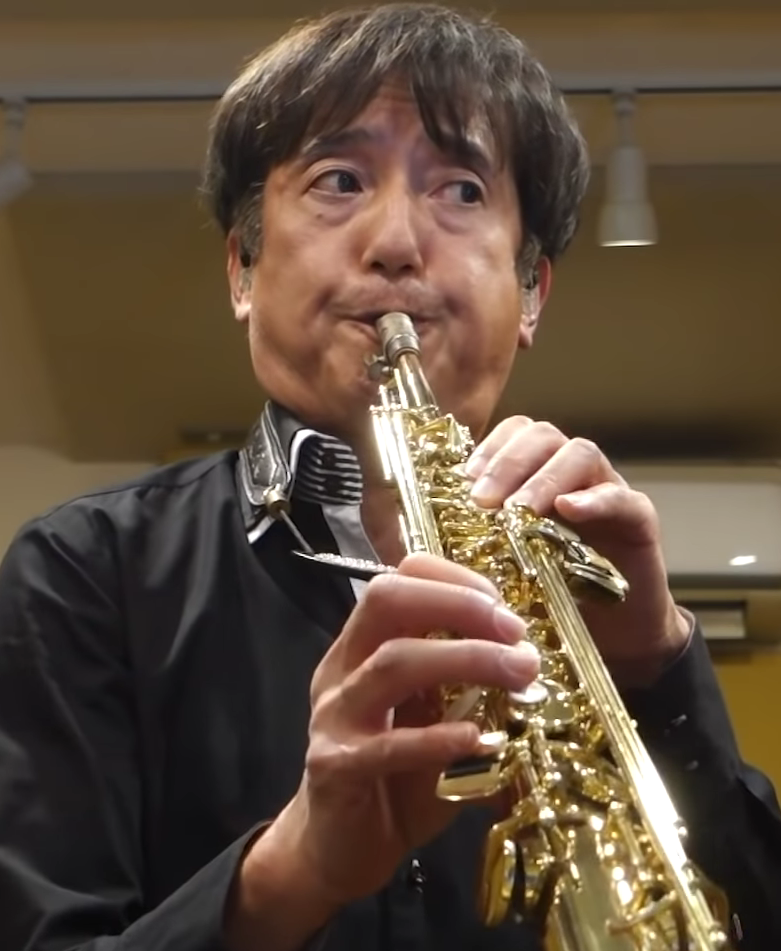
Masato Honda

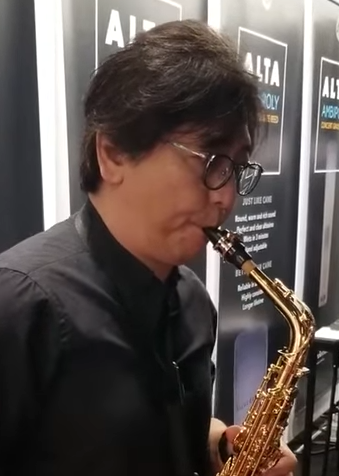
Takahiro Miyazaki
- Takeshi Itoh (1977–1990, 2000–present)
  - The original saxophonist and second longest-running member of T-Square overall. He left the group at the end of 1990 to pursue his solo career and returned to the group in late 2000, starting with the album Friendship. As Masahiro Andoh resigned from T-Square in 2021, Itoh is essentially the Bandleader.
- Masato Honda (1991–1998 as full-time member; 2022–present as supporting member)
  - The second saxophonist of T-Square. He first recorded with the band in 1990 and was welcomed in the original Farewell & Welcome concert in early 1991, replacing Takeshi Itoh. He is best known for songs like Megalith, Little League Star, Traffic Jam, Summer Mirage (夏の蜃気楼, Natsu no Shinkirou), Bad Moon, Samurai Metropolis, etc. He left T-Square after the release of Blue in Red in 1997 to begin his solo career as well, having only attended their 20th Anniversary Concert in 1998. However, he composed one song, A Distancia on the band's 27th album, Brasil, despite being no longer part of the band (he would later self-cover the song in his solo album Cross Hearts). After leaving, he would work with musicians such as bassist Tomohito Aoki, trumpeter Eric Miyashiro, guitarist Jun Kajiwara, etc., and form Voice of Elements with former T-Square members Keiji Matsumoto, Mitsuru Sutoh, and Hiroyuki Noritake. Masato contributed brass arrangements and recorded saxophone parts (and even recorded trading solos with his predecessor, Itoh, on the title track, "As You Wish") for T-Square's 2022 album Wish, 24 years after leaving the band. Honda returned as a member of the newly renamed T-Square Alpha X after a run of "Welcome Back" concerts in December 2022. Consequently, he would appear on T-Square's 50th studio album Vento de Felicidade and the 45th anniversary concert that would come soon after.
  - Due to his capabilities as a multi-instrumentalist, the studio recordings of Human and Welcome to the Rose Garden had the brass section being all played by himself. This was emphasized in the credit of those two albums and many live performances, in which he was credited simply as playing "Woodwind & Brass Instruments". This concept was taken even further when Honda released and produced his second solo album, Carry Out, entirely on his own. On this album, Honda played woodwind and brass instruments, as usual, but additionally programmed synthesizers, played piano, guitar, bass, drums and provided vocals.
- Takahiro Miyazaki (ja) (1998–2000)
  - The band's third, and shortest-tenured full-time saxophonist, being welcomed in the second Farewell & Welcome concert in 1998 as the replacement of Masato Honda. He appeared as the sole leading saxophonist in the studio album Gravity in 1998, Sweet & Gentle in 1999, and finally, their album T-Square in early 2000. However, the album Vocal^{2} in 2002 was his first recording with the band since his departure. Furthermore, he has maintained his solo career and appeared in all anniversary concerts since the 20th anniversary special (being the first overall) in 1998. (Note: 20th, 25th, 30th, 35th, 40th, and 45th anniversary concerts.)

All three saxophonists worked together for one album, Four Nine.

=== Guitar ===
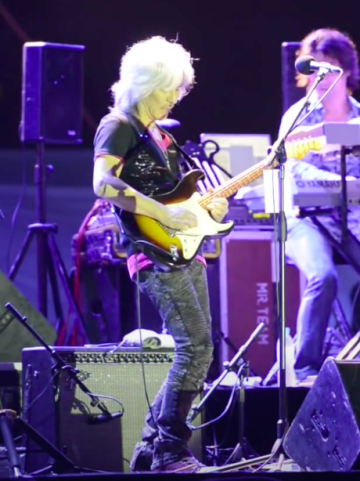
Masahiro Andoh
- Masahiro Andoh (ja) (1976–2021)
  - The founding guitarist, main composer and leader of T-Square. He is one of three guitarists (alongside Casiopea guitarist Issei Noro and guitarist Hirokuni Korekata) in the supergroup Ottottrio and has also been well known for songs such as "Moon Over the Castle" in the Gran Turismo series. Briefly disbanded the group shortly after the release of their self-titled album in 2000, as he initially left the band and wanted to find a new guitarist to continue the band's activities, but returned with saxophonist Takeshi Itoh later that year. He left the band in 2021 after the release of the album Fly, Fly, Fly!
- Yuhji Mikuriya (1977–1978)
  - Appeared in the band's debut albums Lucky Summer Lady and Midnight Lover in 1978. He also formed a guitar duo with Masahiro Andoh called anmi2. His role is more of a rhythm guitarist, in contrast to Andoh playing lead.
- Yuma Hara (2021–2023, supporting member)
  - A guitarist with only 2 solo studio albums to his name, but also an Arranger for several J-Pop artists, who began performing with T-Square alpha on a concert at Blue Note Tokyo on October 23, 2021. His first album alongside T-Square was their 2022 album "Wish".
- Kazuma Sotozono (ja) (2022–2025, supporting member)
  - Began recording on T-Square's 2022 album Wish, accompanied the band as a supporting member at a number of their Year-End live shows of that year, and continued to perform with the group throughout 2023, including recording on their 45th anniversary album Vento de Felicidade and performing on the 45th Anniversary concert.
- Shuya Kameyama (ja) (2024–2025 as supporting member; 2025–present as full member)
  - One of two musicians introduced as an audition finalist in August 2024. His first album alongside T-Square was their 2025 album "Turn the Page".

=== Keyboards ===
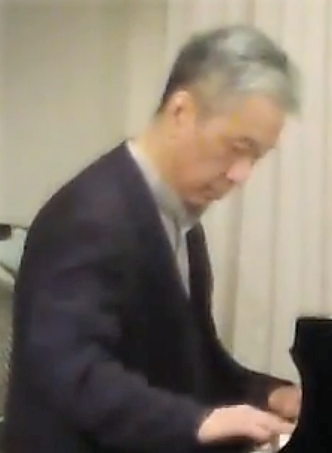
Jun Hakamazuka

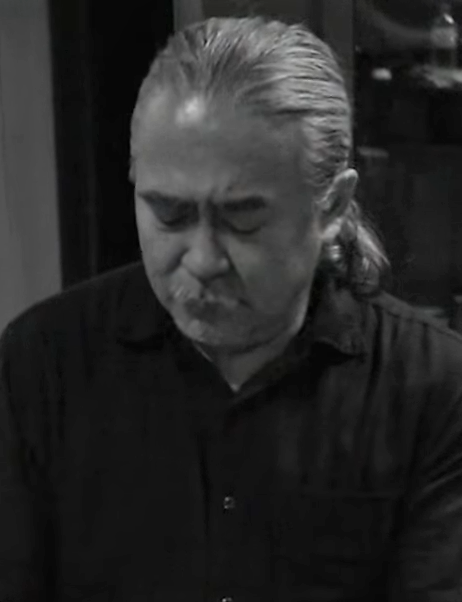
Hirotaka Izumi

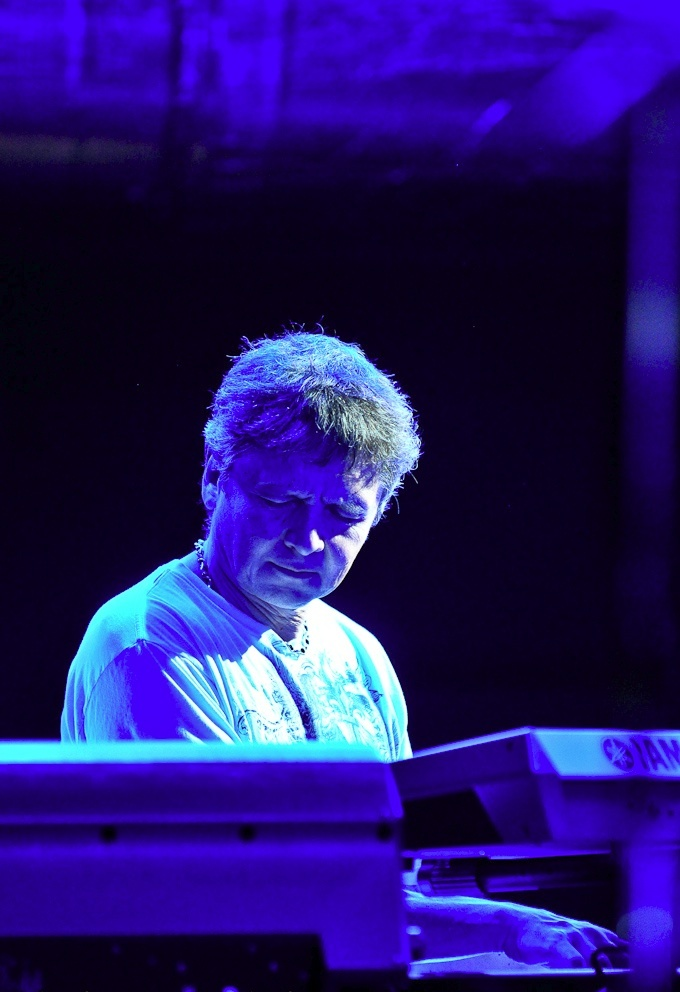
Philippe Saisse (guest)

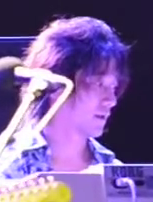
Keizoh Kawano
- Jun Hakamazuka (ja) (1976–1977)
  - The band's pianist during the formation. He left the group and became a professional jazz pianist.
- Junko Miyagi (ja) (1978–1979)
  - Replaced Jun Hakamazuka on keyboards in 1977 and has also worked in the band's first three studio albums, also leaving in 1979. Her role was briefly filled by keyboardist and songwriter Izumi Kobayashi in mid-1979 only.
- Shiro Sagisu (1978)
  - Was a Support Keyboardist in The Square's first studio albums. He left between early and mid-1979.
- Daisaku Kume (ja) (1979–1981)
  - Was part of Prism before joining The Square at the end of 1979. His first studio appearance was in 1980. He left in 1982, but would appear in the 20th, 40th, and 45th Anniversary concerts.
- Hirotaka Izumi (1982–1998 as Full Member; 2003 and onward as Occasional Support-Member) (died April 26, 2021)
  - Replaced Daisaku Kume and joined at the same time as Tohru Hasebe. He was the first long-term keyboardist of the band. He composed songs with examples consisting of Omens of Love, Forgotten Saga, Takarajima, Cape Light, Cry for the Moon, Twilight in Upper West, etc. He officially departed from the band in 1997, but he would sometimes be called in as a guest musician for T-Square Anniversary/Classic Lineup Reunion concerts for the 2000s and 2010s until his death due to acute heart failure on April 26, 2021. Two of the songs that were composed by him, Omens of Love and Takarajima had a brass version rearranged by Toshio Mashima and became famous as the standard songs for many brass bands in Japan.
  - In addition to playing Piano, Izumi originally handled Auxiliary Synthesizer work (Brass Parts, String Parts, sometimes even going as far as to actually help write parts for Brass and String Sections in the Studio Version of their songs), but since 1997, expressed a want to simply play piano.
  - T-Square hosted concerts between 2022 and 2024 with the setlist mainly consisting of Izumi songs as a show of respect for his tenure in the band, punctuated by his Classically inclined, Jazz & Pop-friendly style of songwriting that has become a trademark of not only his own sound but that of The Square in the 1980s and 90s. (Note: See Blue Note Tokyo live reports.)
- Tadashi Namba (ja) (1998)
  - Joined the band during Farewell & Welcome Live 1998 as the replacement of Hirotaka Izumi. He would then appear in Gravity and the 20th anniversary reunion. He left T-Square a few months later. (Note: Originally, Namba was scheduled to produce the new album, but was not scheduled to join. He was suddenly welcomed as a member after Izumi left the band, but it seems that it was difficult for Namba (who is based in the United States) to join.)
- Keiji Matsumoto (ja) (1998–1999, 2021–present as "Special Support"; 1999–2000)
  - Replaced Tadashi Namba and joined T-Square at the end of 1998 as a supporting member. He became an official member of T-Square after the release of Sweet & Gentle in 1999. He left the group after its dissolution to work as a session pianist. Notably, he has recorded and performed with the likes of Masato Honda, Masayoshi Takanaka and The Super Mario Players. In December 2021, Matsumoto made a full return to T-Square as a supporting member, marking his first activities with the band since the album Vocal^{2} in 2002.
- Keizoh Kawano (2000–2004, 2020–present (as "Special Support"); 2004–2020 (as Full-Time Member); 2025–Present (as Producer))
  - The longest-tenured keyboardist of T-Square (with 4 years as a supporting member and 16 years as an official keyboardist), who joined in late 2000 as a support keyboardist. His first documented appearance with T-Square is in their "Friendship Live" concert video. Kawano's predecessor, Hirotaka Izumi, would sometimes play grand piano as a guest in T-Square concerts, while Kawano would perform Auxiliary Synth work. Kawano became the main keyboardist of T-Square in 2004, a role he held for 15 years until he became hospitalized with a stroke in 2019, leaving him unable to use the left side of his body. His role was filled by keyboardist Philippe Saisse, Yudai Satoh, and Akito Shirai. Crème de la Crème was his last album with T-Square as an official member. However, he intends to continue activities like contributing to some of the compositions for T-Square's future music.
  - He is credited as a producer on their newest album, Turn the Page!.
- Philippe Saisse (1995, 2019, supporting member)
  - Performed on the T-Square and Friends album Miss You in New York in 1995, and replaced Keizoh Kawano during his medical recovery. This was during the Special Tour supporting their 2019 album Horizon.
  - In addition to his brief stints as a Session Player in a select few T-Square albums, Philippe Saisse provided keyboard work on many of Takeshi Itoh's solo albums and Satoshi Bandoh's solo album Step by Step! in 2016.
- Akito Shirai (ja) (2019–present, supporting member)
  - Joined during the 2019 tour in Seoul. His first album with T-Square was AI Factory in 2020.
- Yudai Satoh (ja) (2019–2022, supporting member)
  - Before performing with T-Square itself, he performed with Hirotaka Izumi, Kiyoshi Murakami and Masami Itagaki in 2008, for Izumi's "Live 0801" Concert Video. Little more than a decade later, he performed on their Live Tour to promote their 2019 album Horizon. He also appeared in one of Masahiro Andoh's "Farewell Tour" performances alongside T-Square, with his first studio recording in T-Square being 2022's Wish.
- Yuichi Hasegawa (ja) (2024–2025 as supporting member; 2025–present as full member)
  - One of two musicians introduced as an audition finalist in August 2024. His first studio recording in T-Square was 2025's Turn the Page.

=== Bass ===
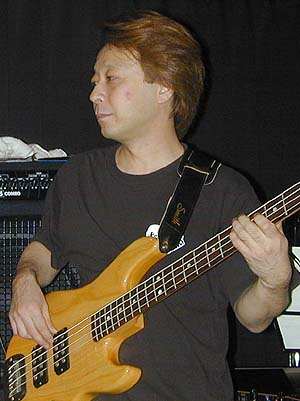
Toyoyuki Tanaka

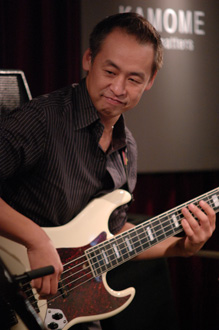
Mitsuru Sutoh

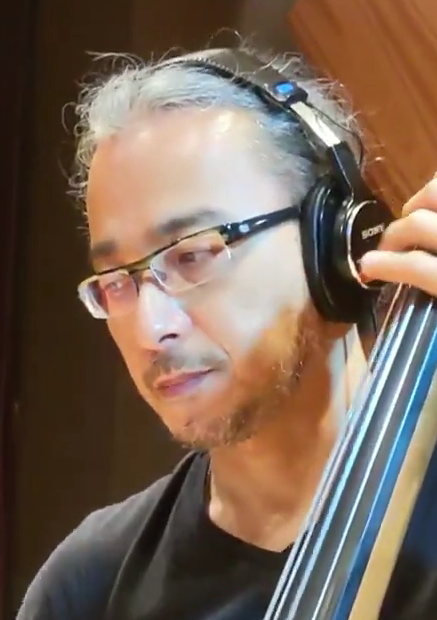
Kiichiro Komobuchi (tour support)

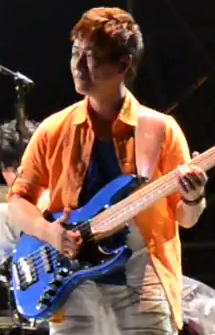
Shingo Tanaka

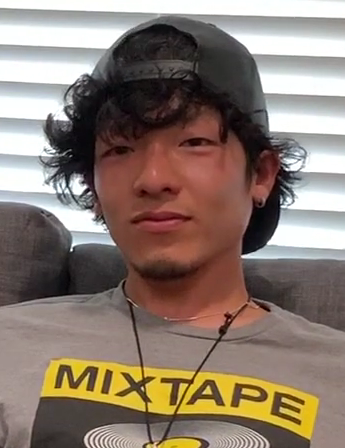
Taiki Tsuyama (album support)
- Yuhji Nakamura (1976–1980)
  - The Square's original bassist. He appeared in the first four albums and was replaced by Toyoyuki Tanaka in 1981.
- Toyoyuki Tanaka (ja) (1981–1986)
  - Replaced Yuhji Nakamura and first appeared in the studio album Magic, adding slap-bass to give the band a more rock and funk sound, as well as composing songs such as Rodan, Between, Stingray, Stimulator, and Overhead Kick. He left the band after the release of S.P.O.R.T.S. in 1986.
- Mitsuru Sutoh (ja) (1986–2000 as full member; 2003 and onward as an occasional supporting member)
  - The first long-term bassist of T-Square, though not the longest-tenured. He joined the group at the end of 1986 and debuted in one of their most famous albums, Truth in 1987. He composed songs such as "Nab That Chap", "Dooba Wooba" (alongside Hiroyuki Noritake), "Sunnyside Cruise", "Pioggia Di Capri", "From the Bottom of My Heart", "Explorer", "Ms. Bracing", "Scrambling", "Our Fortress", and "An Evening Glow". He left after the group disbanded in 2000, and returned for the band's 25th anniversary in 2003 with Hirotaka Izumi. He also formed the band TRIX alongside former Casiopea drummer Noriaki Kumagai.
- Kiyoshi Murakami (ja) (2000, supporting member)
  - One of the session bassists during the unit era. He appeared in the live performances in 2000.
- Shunsuke "Xenon" Ishikawa (ja) (2001–2002)
  - Joined the band as a session bassist during a live performance as the "Japan version" of T-Square Plus in 2001.
  - He is the Bassist for Seikima-II. In accordance with the name of his band, Seikima II derived from Seikimatsu (世紀末, the end of the century), Ishikawa's brief stint in T-Square was shortly after Seikima-II originally broke up.
- Katsuji Morioka (ja) (2004–2005)
  - First appeared in the Year-End performance in 2003. He also appeared in the studio albums Groove Globe in 2004 and Passion Flower in 2005.
- Shingo Tanaka (ja) (2005–2025 as supporting member; 2025–present as full member)
  - Debuted with T-Square during their live performance of the album Passion Flower in 2005 as a "Special Support" member. He is the band's longest-tenured bassist and, after 20 years, became an official member in 2025.
- Sohta Morimitsu (2021–2022, supporting member)
  - Played on T-Square albums Fly! Fly! Fly! in 2021 and Wish in 2022.

=== Drums ===
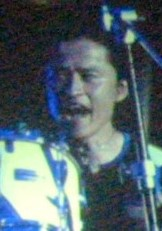
Hiroyuki Noritake

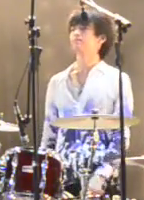
Satoshi Bandoh
- Shunichi Harada (ja) (1976)
  - Played during the Square's earliest stages. He left the band shortly after to work in other jazz-related groups.
- Michael S. Kawai (ja) (1977–1979 as full-time drummer, 2005-08 as Producer)
  - The replacement of Shunichi Harada. He appeared in the band's first three studio albums, and has worked with T-Square after, with his latest appearance being in the 40th Anniversary concert in 2018.
  - He also is credited as a producer for 5 consecutive studio albums, from "Groove Globe" through "Wonderful Days", and helped with producing the first "T-Square Plays the Square" cover album.
- Jun Aoyama (ja) (1979–1980) (died December 3, 2013)
  - Replaced Michael Kawai and joined at the end of 1979, appearing in the album Rockoon released in 1980. He was best known as Tatsuro Yamashita's support drummer from 1979 to 2003. He was also in another band after leaving the Square, known as Prism.
- Eiji Shimizu (1981)
  - Replaced Aoyama on Drums and joined the band alongside bassist Toyoyuki Tanaka in 1981, appearing in the album Magic. He would leave the band with keyboardist Daisaku Kume in mid-1982.
- Tohru Hasebe (ja) (1982–1985)
  - Before joining the Square in 1982, he was in ANKH that formed in 1980. His first appearance with the Square was in the album Temptation of Shapely Legs. He left the Square in late 1985, but is one of many past members who have appeared in multiple reunion concerts.
- Hiroyuki Noritake (ja) (1985–2000 as Full Member; 2000–2004 and after as Occasional Support)
  - Replaced Tohru Hasebe on drums at the end of 1985. He is T-Square's second longest-tenured drummer (for 15 years as an official member and, subsequently, as a supporting member for 4), also being a co-composer of the track Dooba Wooba! from the album Wave in 1989, with his first individual composition of the band being No More Tears from Natsu no Wakusei (夏の惑星) in 1994. He has also composed tracks such as One Step Beyond, Yuh-Ja, Tooi Taiko, Eurostar etc. He became a "Special Support" member during the band's return in late 2000. He would leave T-Square in mid-2004 after nearly 20 years with the band. Following the Casiopea vs. the Square concert in 2003, he also formed a drummer duo with Casiopea drummer Akira Jimbo in 2004 known as Synchronized DNA (which would also collaborate with Casiopea that same year).
- Satoshi Bandoh (ja) (2004–present)
  - T-Square's current and longest-tenured drummer (with 20 years as an official member), who joined in the summer of 2004. Aside from T-Square, he has maintained a solo career with 3 albums to his name, he has appeared as a Support drummer for Dimension albums, (Note: See Dimension discography.) and has also contributed to some famous video game soundtracks, including the Mario Kart series (Mario Kart 8 and Mario Kart World) and the Gran Turismo series. Due to his busy schedule, his role was filled by Maoki Yamamoto and Senri Kawaguchi.

=== Percussion ===
- Kiyohiko Semba (ja) (1978–1980)
  - The Square's original percussionist. He was an official member since the group's debut up to Rockoon in 1980. However, he would continue to work in most future albums as a guest musician.

== Offshoot bands ==
=== The Square Reunion/T-Square Family ===
In order to differentiate from the current/ongoing group known as "T-Square" (who are officially Itoh, Bandoh, Tanaka, Hasegawa, and Kameyama as of 2025), Since September 2000 (beginning, specifically, with the live album Moment – Memorial Live at Chicken George (Note: Ryoh Hayashi supported the Square on keyboards.)), the band has occasionally held throwback concerts, going under their old name of "the Square" (with the word Reunion added in 2017), with their classic lineups from the 80s and 90s, performing almost-exclusively their songs from that era. Most-recently, this idea has expanded to where other members, who joined and left after 1989, appear as part of these concerts. Thus, the name "T-Square Family" refers to any random lineup of those who were formerly officially in the band, or were at the very least supporting members, and are appearing for one-off concerts.

=== AnMi2/AnMitsuru ===
AnMi2, named after Anmitsu, are a guitar duo comprising the first two guitarists of T-Square, Masahiro Andoh and Yuhji Mikuriya. For their 10th anniversary, the duo performed with fellow ex-T-Square Bassist Mitsuru Sutoh and was renamed "AnMitsuru".

=== Trio the Square/The Masato Honda Band/Voice of Elements ===
This trio first appeared in the T-Square albums Sweet & Gentle in 1999 and T-SQUARE in 2000 with keyboardist Keiji Matsumoto, drummer Hiroyuki Noritake and bassist Mitsuru Sutoh as Trio the Square. They became a standalone group around the time Andoh initially left T-Square, resulting in the dissolution of the band form.

Later in 2000, Hiroyuki Noritake and Keiji Matsumoto, along with bassist Tomohito Aoki and guitarist Jun Kajiwara, would become the backing band of former T-Square saxophonist, Masato Honda. The group didn't have an official name, but it was collectively dubbed by fans as "The Masato Honda Band".

The backing band was put on hold in 2005, then fully deactivated in early mid-2006 to make way for Voice of Elements, which also featured T-Square alumni Hiroyuki Noritake, Mitsuru Sutoh and Keiji Matsumoto. Tomohito Aoki, the original bassist of the Masato Honda Band, died of acute heart failure in June that year, and was replaced by Sutoh for following Masato Honda Band activities. Voice of Elements, as the band was called when they returned in 2006, continued their occasional performances since 2007. Both Keiji Matsumoto and Masato Honda are credited as guest performers on the 2022 T-Square album, "WISH", while both Hiroyuki Noritake and Mitsuru Sutoh are credited as guest performers on the 2023 T-Square album, "VENTO DE FELICIDADE" alongside Matsumoto and Honda.

=== Ottottrio ===
This group was a fusion supergroup led by 3 guitarists: Masahiro Andoh of T-Square, Issei Noro of Casiopea and Hirokuni Korekata with many side projects. Along with Masahiro Andoh, drummer Hiroyuki Noritake was another T-Square musician who was part of this group since 1988. Also, T-Square bassist Mitsuru Sutoh (who would leave T-Square in their brief disbandment two years later) and keyboardist Keiji Matsumoto (who would join T-Square a few months later) recorded with them at the end of 1998. Noro and Korekata appeared in T-Square's 35th Anniversary concert in 2013.

=== KoreNoS/Rocket Jam ===
Stylized as KoreNoS, this band was formed in 1998 by Hirokuni Korekata, Hiroyuki Noritake and Mitsuru Sutoh. They released two studio albums, "Asian Street Style" (2004) and "Abracadabra" (2005). They also released a live album in 2007. Hirokuni Korekata also created a new band named Rocket Jam with bassist Shingo Tanaka and drummer Satoshi Bandoh in 2013.

=== Casiopea vs. the Square ===
Although "Casiopea vs. the Square" was performed as a one-off event in 2003 (the DVD and the CD have different audio sources, suggesting that there may have been 2 shows), this extension of 2 different jazz fusion bands goes back to 1989. All members of T-Square, Casiopea, and Ottottrio played in The Super Fusion in 1989 and Kiyohiko Semba, former percussionist of the Square, played on one of the songs from Casiopea's 1993 album, "Dramatic". A year later, both groups played an arrangement of The Beatles' "Get Back" on a Japanese Broadcast. 3 years after that, Casiopea, T-Square and Jimsaku played at Tokyo Jam 1997, with the same song. In 2003, both groups played (with some of the players replaced) at the event called Casiopea vs. the Square. (Note: The joint concert is not the first time Casiopea and T-Square have performed together; they have performed together many times before, at events such as Crossover Japan.) Both groups still have somewhat of an alliance, seeing as Casiopea's 1993 – 1997 drummer, Noriaki Kumagai and former T-Square bassist, Mitsuru Sutoh are both in TRIX. And Sax player Takeshi Itoh performed with Casiopea's Keyboardist, Minoru Mukaiya in 2006.

=== Synchronized DNA ===
Drummers Hiroyuki Noritake of T-Square and Akira Jimbo of Casiopea formed a duo in 2003, after the "Casiopea vs. the Square" concert. They were later featured in Casiopea's 2005 album "Signal", the aforementioned band's last album before their hiatus the year after.

=== Pyramid ===
A group that features pianist Hirotaka Izumi (who would die in 2021), drummer Akira Jimbo and guitarist Yuji Toriyama, along with other studio musicians. They have released four studio albums and one digital album.

=== Akasaka Trio ===
Guitarist Masahiro Andoh, Drummer Hiroyuki Noritake and Bassist Mitsuru Sutoh, all former T-Square members from Classic Lineups of the mid-80s to 2000, formed the Akasaka Trio in 2022, following Andoh's exit from T-Square.

=== As supporting members for other artists ===
After the dissolution of Trio the Square, Mitsuru Sutoh and Keiji Matsumoto would later become backing musicians for Japanese a cappella pop group, 'The Gospellers'. Sutoh also plays for TRIX (since that band's formation in 2004), led by Noriaki Kumagai (Casiopea drummer from 1993 – 1996).

Drummer Hiroyuki Noritake, keyboardist Keizoh Kawano, and bassist Ko Shimizu (from Naniwa Express) would record as supporting members for Japanese fusion/rock guitarist Kumi Adachi in 2007–2008.

T-Square's current bassist Shingo Tanaka is a former member of the 39's/the Thank You's (39 in Japanese can be pronounced as san kyū (サンキュー), which resembles Thank You). The 39's were a band that accompanied concerts performed by Vocaloids, specifically the "39's Giving Day" concert series (it being another pun, this time on "Thanksgiving Day"), although the concerts themselves wouldn't necessarily be held on said day. During the final 39's Giving Day Concert in March 2012, the band were also accompanied by Takahiro Miyazaki.

== Discography ==
=== Studio albums ===
- Lucky Summer Lady (1978)
- Midnight Lover (1978)
- Make Me a Star (1979)
- Rockoon (1980)
- Magic (1981)
- Temptation of Shapely Legs (脚線美の誘惑, Kyakusenbi no Yuhwaku) (1982)
  - First album with Hirotaka Izumi on keyboards.
- The Water of the Rainbow (うち水にRainbow, Uchi Mizu ni Rainbow) (1983)
- Adventures (1984)
- Stars and the Moon (1984)
- R.E.S.O.R.T. (1985)
  - Final album with Tohru Hasebe on drums.
- S.P.O.R.T.S. (1986)
  - First album with Hiroyuki Noritake on drums.
  - Final album with Toyoyuki Tanaka on bass.
  - First album to win a Japan Gold Disc Award.
- Truth (1987)
  - First album with Mitsuru Sutoh on bass.
- Yes, No (1988)
- Wave (1989)
- Natural (1990)
  - The Final Album with Takeshi Itoh as Leading Saxophonist, at least at the time.
- New-S (1991)
  - First album with Masato Honda as leading saxophonist.
- Impressive (1992)
- Human (1993)
- Summer Planet (夏の惑星, Natsu no Wakusei) (1994)
- Welcome to the Rose Garden (1995)
- B.C.A.D. (1996)
- Blue in Red (1997)
  - Final album with Masato Honda as leading saxophonist.
  - Final album with Hirotaka Izumi on keyboards.
- Gravity (1998)
  - First album with Takahiro Miyazaki as leading saxophonist.
  - Only album with Tadashi Namba on keyboards.
- Sweet and Gentle (1999)
  - First album with Keiji Matsumoto on keyboards.
- T-Square (2000)
  - The cover art of this album is a brick wall, setting the tone for a possible break-up to this band.
  - Final album with Takahiro Miyazaki as leading saxophonist.
  - Trio the Square was formed after this album. The trio was composed of Mitsuru Sutoh, Hiroyuki Noritake and Keiji Matsumoto.
  - Masahiro Andoh, the band's only member who hadn't left his role since 1976, believed the band has reached its limit and couldn't go much farther. He composed more music which became the next album.
- Friendship (2000)
  - Takeshi Itoh returns as leading saxophonist for the first time since 1990. At this point, only he and Andoh are considered T-Square members, and much of the album consists of overseas musicians as session players.
- Brasil (2001)
- New Road, Old Way (2002)
- Spirits (2003) (as the Square)
  - For a brief moment, Andoh and Itoh are joined by their 1987–1997 rhythm section, drummer Hiroyuki Noritake, bassist Mitsuru Sutoh and Hirotaka Izumi, though Izumi now strictly plays piano, and newcomer Keizoh Kawano adds auxiliary synthesizers.
- Groove Globe (2004)
  - Final album with Hiroyuki Noritake on drums.
  - First album to include Keizoh Kawano as a full-time keyboardist.
- Passion Flower (2005)
  - First album with Satoshi Bandoh on drums.
- Blood Music (2006)
  - First album with Shingo Tanaka on bass.
- 33 (2007)
- Wonderful Days (2008) (as T-Square Super Band)
  - For their 30th Anniversary, T-Square worked with their 80s/90s lineup musicians, so Shingo Tanaka is absent from the recordings/tour. (Note: Andoh said that Tanaka is not counted as a member because if he were officially added, it would interfere with his work outside of the band due to his contract with the agency.)
- Discoveries (2009)
  - Shingo Tanaka returns for session work.
- Time Travel (時間旅行, Jikan Ryoko) (2010)
- Nine Stories (2011)
- Wings (2012)
- Smile (2013) (as T-Square Super Band)
- Next (2014)
- Paradise (2015)
- Treasure Hunter (2016)
- Rebirth (2017)
- City Coaster (2018)
- It's a Wonderful Life! (2018) (as T-Square and the Square Reunion)
- Horizon (2019)
- AI Factory (2020)
  - Final album with Keizoh Kawano on keyboards.
- Fly! Fly! Fly! (2021)
  - Final album with Masahiro Andoh, the longest-tenured T-Square guitarist since 1976.
- Wish (2022)
  - First album to include Masato Honda in 24 years.
  - First album to include Keiji Matsumoto in 22 years.
- Vento de Felicidade (しあわせの風, Shiawase no Kaze; lit. 'Wind of Happiness') (2023)
- Turn the Page! (2025)
  - First album with Yuichi Hasegawa on keyboards.
  - First album with Shuya Kameyama on guitar.
  - First album with Shingo Tanaka as an official member (he previously worked as a support member for 20 years)
- Voyage (2026)

=== Collaboration albums ===
- F-1 Grand Prix World (1992)
- Solitude – Dedicated to Senna (1994) (as T-Square and Friends)

=== Live albums ===
- The Square Live (Vinyl/CD) (1985)
  - This was recorded from June 21–24, 1985, while a separate video under the same name was recorded shortly after on July 2.
- T-Square Live – Featuring F-1 Grand Prix Theme (1990)
  - Although this was Masato Honda's first appearance with T-Square, he was not yet considered a leading saxophonist.
- T-Square Live – Farewell & Welcome (1991)
- Yaon de Asobu – 20th Anniversary Special (1998)
  - Technically, not an album, but a concert that aired on Japanese Cable Channel Viewsic in July 1998.
- Moment (2001)
- Casiopea vs. the Square Live (2004)
- Year End Live 20151219–24 Best Take Complete Selection (2016)
- Year End Special 2021 at Nihonbashi Mitsui Hall (2023)
- Hall Concert Tour 2022 "Wish" at Namba Hatch (2023)

=== Rearrange albums ===
- Natural (U.S. Version) (1990)
- Refreshest (1991) (as T-Square and Friends)
- Classics (1992) (with Royal Philharmonic Orchestra)
- Harmony (1993) (with Royal Philharmonic Orchestra)
- Takarajima (1995) (with Munich Symphony Orchestra and City of London Wind Ensemble)
- Miss you in New York (1995) (as T-Square and Friends)
- Truth 21 Century (2001) (as T-Square Plus)
- Music Voyage from The Scene (2001)
  - This album was composed of songs used in a DVD series, The Scene (ザ・シーン), which only has footage of scenery.
  - Some of the songs are simple arrangements of older T-Square songs.
  - This album only has the participation of Takeshi Itoh, Masahiro Andoh and Keizoh Kawano. In fact, this is the First Album to include Keizoh Kawano as an Auxiliary Synth Keyboardist.
- Vocal^{2} (or Vocal Square) (2002) (as T-Square and Friends)
- T Comes Back (2003)
- History (2013) (as T-Square Plus)

=== Self-cover albums ===
- Treasure Songs – T-Square Plays the Square (宝曲(たからのうた), Takara no Uta) (2010)
- Dream Songs – T-Square Plays the Square (夢曲(ゆめのうた), Yume no Uta) (2011)
- Rainbow Songs – T-Square Plays T & the Square Special (虹曲(にじのうた), Niji no Uta) (2012)
- Crème de la Crème (2020)

== Unofficial singles ==
- "Japanese Soul Brothers" (1979) (NHK broadcast)
  - The first official recording of this song not from a radio or TV broadcast was in their 1985 live album The Square Live.
  - The first official studio recording of this song is from their 1998 album Gravity as a bonus track, thanking fans for supporting T-Square for 20 years.
- "Jungle Strut" (1982)

== Compilations ==
- Light Up (1983)
- The Best of the Square (1983)
- All About Us (1984)
- Color Palette (1987) (as the Square and Friends)
- F-1 Grand Prix (1989)
- Megalith (1992)
- Exciting Peace (1998)
- Wordless Anthology I (1999)
- Wordless Anthology II (1999)
- Wordless Anthology III (1999)
- Single Collection (2001)
- 25th Anniversary (2004)
- Wordless Anthology IV (2006)
- Wordless Anthology V (2006)
- The Box (2008)
- 35th Anniversary The Box More (2013)
- 35th Anniversary The Box 2013 (2013)
- Dolphin Through (2015)
- Crème de la Crème – Édition spéciale (2021)

== Videography ==
=== Music videos ===
- Truth (1987)
- Truth 1991 Version (1991)

=== Live videos ===
- Concert Live Adventures (1984)
- R.E.S.O.R.T. (1985)
- The Square Live (VHS/LaserDisc) (1985)
- Live in New York (1988)
- Live At Roxy (1989)
- Live "Natural" (1990)
- Megalith (1991)
- Club Circuit Human '93 (1993)
- Harmony (1994)
- T-Square and Friends Live In Tokyo (1995)
- Farewell & Welcome Live 1998 (1998)
- Friendship Live (2001)
- Casiopea vs. The Square – The Live (2004)
- Live Passion Flower (2005)
- Visual Anthology Vol. 1 (2005)
- Visual Anthology Vol. 2 (2005)
- Visual Anthology Vol. 3 (2005)
- T-Square Super Band Concert Tour 2008 Final Wonderful Days (2008)
- 30th Anniversary Festival (2009)
- 35th Anniversary Festival (2014)
- Fantastic Square Live (2015)
- Concert Tour "Treasure Hunter" (2016)
- The Legend – The Square at Yokohama Live for the first time in 31 years (2016)
- "The Legend" / The Square Reunion Live at Blue Note Tokyo (2017)
- "Fantastic History" / The Square Reunion Live at Blue Note Tokyo (2017)
- 40th Anniversary Celebration Concert "It's A Wonderful Life" Complete Edition (2018)
- Horizon Special Tour at Blue Note Tokyo (2020)
- 2020 Live Streaming Concert at Zepp Tokyo (2020)
- Masahiro Ando Farewell Tour (2021)
- Concert Tour "Fly! Fly! Fly!" (2021)
- In Memoriam Hirotaka Izumi (2022)
- Welcome Back, Masato Honda! (2023)
- 45th Anniversary Celebration Concert (2024)
- Concert Tour 2025 "Turn the Page!" – Live & Document (2025)
- Classics & Harmony (2026)
