= Keizoh Kawano =

Keizoh Kawano 河野啓三
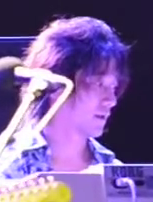
- Kawano in 2012

Background information
- Born: February 4, 1971 (age 55); Tokyo, Japan
- Genres: Jazz fusion
- Occupations: Keyboardist; pianist; composer
- Instruments: Keyboard; piano
- Years active: 2000–present

Keizoh Kawano (河野啓三, Kawano Keizō; born February 4, 1971) is a Japanese pianist, keyboardist, and composer who served as keyboardist and pianist for the band T-Square until August 2020.

== Biography ==
=== Early life ===
Kawano was born in Tokyo. He started playing the electone when he was 6 years old . While attending Kitazono High School in Tokyo, he started playing piano and synthesizer under the influence of his older brother. After graduating, he started working as a professional musician and as a support musician for singers and artists regardless of their music genre.

=== 2000–2019: T-Square ===
In 2000, bassist Toyoyuki Tanaka introduced Kawano to T-Square, a jazz fusion band he was a part of from 1981 to 1986. At this time, T-Square's official members were only their Guitarist, Masahiro Andoh, and their sax player who rejoined after pursuing his own solo Career, Takeshi Itoh.

During this time, T-Square toured with a few Session Players but Kawano joined the band as a support member during the tour supporting their recent album, 'Friendship' in the Autumn of 2000. He continued on as a Support Member, even showing he can perform with top players in Jazz-Fusion when he appeared as a support member during T-Square's well-known co-headline concert with Casiopea in the Summer of 2003.

In 2004, during the tour supporting another album, 'Groove Globe', Kawano became an official member of T-Square, the same year drummer Satoshi Bandoh joined the band. In 2005, he joined the Kumi Adachi Club Pangea, which was formed by former T-Square drummer Hiroyuki Noritake.

In 2011, he announced that he would be releasing his first solo album, Dreams, going on tour to commemorate the release. The album released on November 23, 2011, and charted at No. 211 on the Oricon charts.

=== 2019–present: Hospitalization, withdrawal from touring, and becoming a producer ===
On February 6, 2019, Kawano was urgently hospitalized due to cerebral hemorrhage. Because of this, he took a break from musical activities and was replaced by Philippe Saisse. On August 27, 2019, through their official website, he reported that he was going to be discharged after being hospitalized for more than half a year. The update also mentioned the pathology and course of onset with moderate bleeding in his right putamen, but with treatment performed without the need of surgery. There was no hematoma, but he was paralyzed on his left side of the body and is now unable to play the piano as he had before. He continued with outpatient treatment and rehabilitation, but still played with the band in live performances and song production for the band's next album.

On August 27, 2020, Kawano announced that he would withdraw from T-Square as he was concerned about the prognosis and rehabilitation after treatment for the cerebral hemorrhage that developed in 2019. He judged that sufficient performance activity for the band would be difficult in his current state of recovery. When asked about his withdrawal, he had decided that he would do so before the spring of 2019, but his decision was opposed by Andoh who wanted him to stay. He participated in the production of AI Factory, released in 2020. On October 28, 2020, the album Crème de la Crème was released, making it his last album with T-Square as an official member. He appeared as a special guest at the T-Square Year-End Special 2020 held at the Nihonbashi Mitsui Hall in Tokyo on December 30 and 31, 2020, and continues to perform with T-Square in live concerts and write songs for them to record in Studio Albums. He released his second solo album, "Best Friends" on November 23, 2022.

Kawano helped produce T-Square's most recent album, Turn the Page, in Spring of 2025.

== Discography ==
Title	Album details	Peak chart positions
Title	Album details	Oricon
Dreams	Released: November 23, 2011; Label: Sony Music; Format: CD, digital streaming	211
Best Friends	Released: November 23, 2022; Label: Sony Music; Format: CD, digital streaming	-
