= Midnight Lover (The Square album) =

Studio album by T-Square
- Released: December 21, 1978
- Genre: Jazz fusion
- Length: 29:04
- Label: Sony Music Entertainment Japan

T-Square chronology
Lucky Summer Lady (1978)	Midnight Lover (1978)	Make Me a Star (1979)

Midnight Lover is the second studio album of the Japanese jazz fusion group T-Square, who were then known as The Square. It was released on December 21, 1978.

== Track listing ==
All music is composed by Masahiro Andoh, except where noted.

No.	Title	Length
1.	"Lickin' It"	5:54
2.	"Wrapped Around Your Soul"	5:05
3.	"Show Dance"	3:48
4.	"Take The Long Road" (music: Junko Miyagi)	4:26
5.	"Midnight Lover"	5:00
6.	"This Song"	5:05

== Personnel ==
- Masahiro Andoh - guitar
- Takeshi Itoh - alto saxophone
- Junko Miyagi - Fender Rhodes Electric Piano, Korg MS-20 synthesizer, acoustic piano
- Yuhji Nakamura - bass
- Michael S. Kawai - drums, synthesizer drums
- Kiyohiko Semba - percussion, synthesizer
- Shirō Sagisu - ARP String Ensemble
- Yuhji Mikuriya - Additional guitars, acoustic guitar

== See also ==
- 1978 in Japanese music
