= New-S =

Studio album by T-Square
- Released: March 21, 1991
- Genre: Jazz fusion
- Length: 54:32

T-Square chronology
Natural (1990)	New-S (1991)	Impressive (1992)

New-S is the sixteenth studio album by Japanese Jazz fusion band T-Square, released in 1991. This album marks the introduction of saxophonist Masato Honda to the band, after Takeshi Itoh left the group.

According to Masato Honda's Twitter, the Merchandise sold at the concerts supporting this album, were a Leather CD Case resembling a map and a pocket watch that looks like a Compass (as in NEWS, North, East, West, South) further underscoring the subtitle on the album cover: "The way we have stepped comes to our music. And the way we're stepping will also come to our music".

Later revisions and re-releases of this album give the subtitle as "The path we have followed led us to our music. And the path we are following will also lead us to our music."

== Track listing ==
No.	Title	Music	Length
1.	"Megalith"	Masato Honda	5:20
2.	"ガーティの夢" (Gerty's Dream)	Masahiro Andoh	5:30
3.	"真夏のためいき" (Midsummer Sigh)	Masahiro Andoh	4:52
4.	"Little League Star"	Masato Honda	5:40
5.	"Your Restless Eyes"	Masahiro Andoh	5:47
6.	"Midnight Circle"	Hirotaka Izumi	5:39
7.	"The Summer of '68"	Hirotaka Izumi	5:50
8.	"Nab That Chap!!"	Mitsuru Sutoh	5:30
9.	"Romantic City"	Masahiro Andoh	4:58
10.	"When I Think Of You"	Masato Honda	6:26
