= The Water of the Rainbow =

Studio album by T-Square
- Released: May 21, 1983
- Genre: Jazz fusion
- Length: 40:41

T-Square chronology
Temptation of Shapely Legs (1982)	The Water of the Rainbow (1983)	Adventures (1984)

The Water of the Rainbow (うち水にRainbow, Uchi Mizu ni Rainbow, lit. "Rainbow in Water") is the seventh studio album by Japanese jazz fusion band T-Square, who was then known as The Square. It was released on May 21, 1983.

== Track listing ==
No.	Title	Music	Length
1.	"Hello Goodbye"	John Lennon & Paul McCartney	2:31
2.	"君はハリケーン" (Kimi wa Hurricane/You're a Hurricane)	Masahiro Andoh	5:32
3.	"Sabana Hotel"	Masahiro Andoh	5:02
4.	"Stingray"	Toyoyuki Tanaka	1:26
5.	"Hank & Cliff"	Masahiro Andoh	5:19
6.	"黄昏で見えない" (Tasogare de Mienai/Invisible in the Twilight)	Matsutoya Yumi	4:24
7.	"From 03 To 06 (Receivers)"	Hirotaka Izumi	5:08
8.	"カピオラニの通り雨" (Kapiolani no Tōriame/Kapiolani Rain Shower)	Masahiro Andoh	5:27
9.	"Barbarian"	Masahiro Andoh	4:32
10.	"Hello Goodbye (Reprise)"	John Lennon & Paul McCartney	1:20

== See also ==
- 1983 in Japanese music
