= Natural (T-Square album) =

Studio album by T-Square
- Released: April 21, 1990
- Recorded: 1989
- Studios: Burnish Stone Studio & Recording Studio Tokyo Fun, Tokyo The Slam Shack Studio, North Hollywood
- Genre: Jazz fusion
- Length: 50:36

T-Square chronology
Wave (1989)	Natural (1990)	New-S (1991)

Natural is the fifteenth studio album by Japanese Jazz fusion band T-Square. It was released on April 21, 1990. It was the last to feature Takeshi Itoh on saxophone and EWI, during his initial run with the band (from the formation to 1990). He returned to T-Square in mid-2000 and has been performing with the group ever since. Russ Freeman, who formed and lead the band Rippingtons, produced this album and has composed four tracks. Another Rippingtons member and percussionist Steve Reid worked on this album for three tracks.

== Track listing ==
No.	Title	Music	Length
1.	"Control"	Masahiro Andoh	5:16
2.	"Daisy Field"	Masahiro Andoh	5:16
3.	"Wind Song"	Hirotaka Izumi, Russ Freeman	4:55
4.	"White Mane"	Hirotaka Izumi	5:40
5.	"Happy Song"	Takeshi Itoh	5:03
6.	"Snow Bird"	Masahiro Andoh, Russ Freeman	5:09
7.	"Labyrinth of Love"	Hirotaka Izumi, Russ Freeman	4:53
8.	"Up Town"	Takeshi Itoh	3:37
9.	"Radio Star"	Masahiro Andoh	5:15
10.	"Last Raindrops"	Masahiro Andoh	5:32

== See also ==
- 1990 in Japanese music
