= Western influences in modern Japanese music =

Due to the effects of westernization, western music has influenced many musical cultures around the world. Japan's unique music styles were impacted by this phenomenon prior to the Second World War. Japan's traditional melodic and instrumental music is now less popular than the emergent genres, such as J-Rock and J-Pop. The westernization of Japan has also included the increase of the English language and guitars in musical composition.

== Traditional Japanese music ==
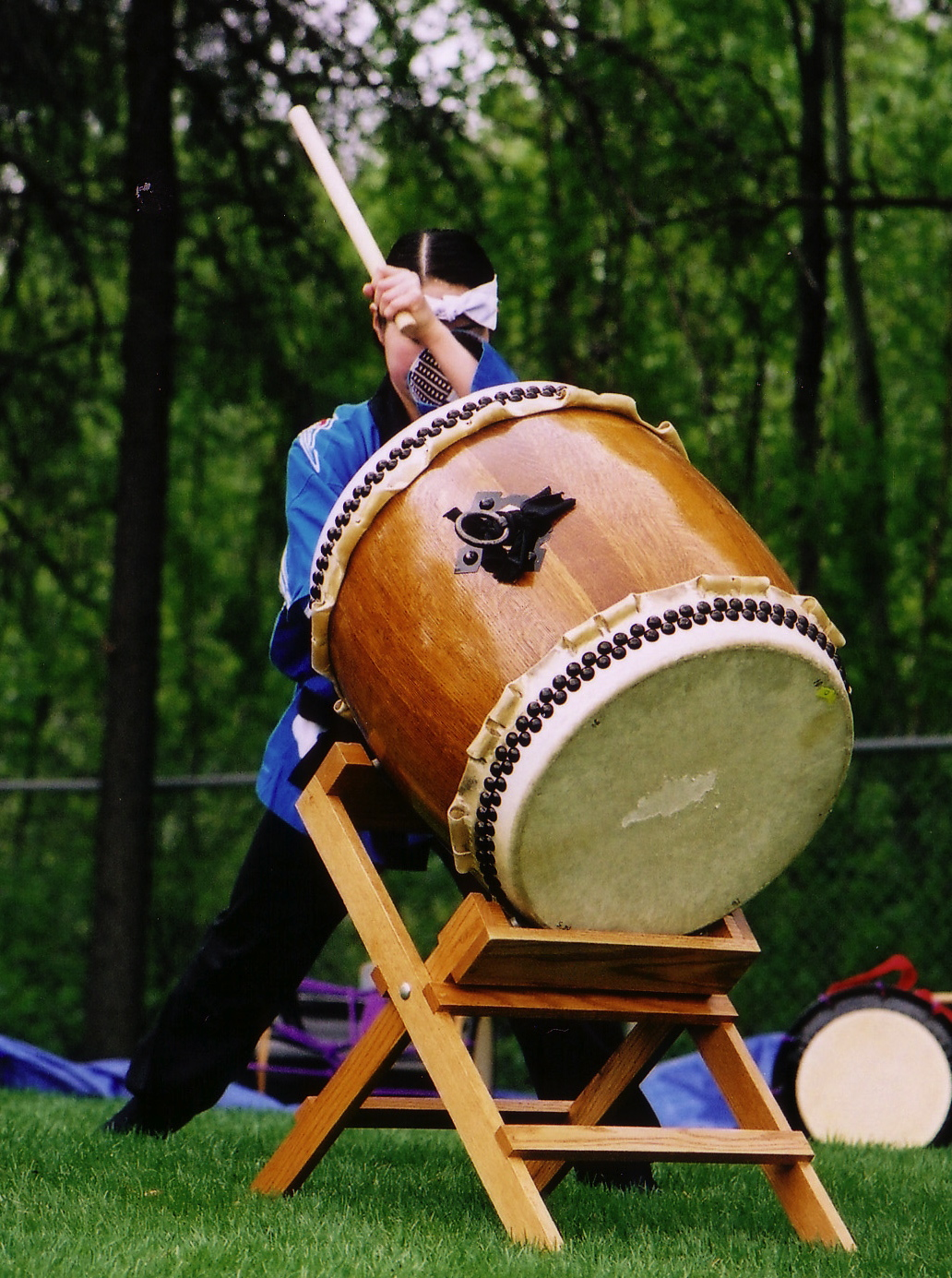
Japanese instrument: Taiko

=== Types of music ===
In traditional Japanese music, there are three types, instrumental music, court music, and theatrical music. From these three music types, many different styles were created. Some of them include Kabuki, Gagaku, and Soukyoku.

==== Kabuki ====
Kabuki is a style of Japanese theatre. It is a mixture of many different live performers before live audiences. The performances include gesture combinations, speech, song, music, and dance. There are three types of Kabuki. Gidayubushi, a type of Japanese narrative music, Shimoza Ongaku, music played in the lower seats of the stage, and Debayashi, incidental music.

==== Gagaku ====
Gagaku, court music, is the oldest musical tradition in Japan. It includes songs, dances, and a mixture of other Asian music. There are two styles of Gagaku, instrumental and vocal.

==== Soukyoku ====
Soukyoku uses the Chinese koto instead of the traditional Japanese koto, a large rectangular floor instrument with thirteen strings. There are two types of Soukyoku, Ikuta ryu, from Eastern Japan, and Yamada ryu, from Western Japan.

=== Instruments ===
In traditional Japanese music, a large range of instruments were widely used, such as Koto, Hyoushigi, Kane, Taiko, Ichigenkin, Shamisen, Hocchiku, Shakuhachi, Hichiriki, and Horagai. Each of these instruments have unique sounds and ways of playing them.

==== Koto ====
The Japanese koto has thirteen strings and requires the player to use three finger picks to pluck the strings to create a vibrant melody. The instrument is usually placed on the floor because of its large rectangular size.

==== Hyoushigi ====
The Hyoushigi is a simple instrument. It consists of two wood blocks, or bamboo, connected by a thin rope. The blocks are played together to create a clapping melody.

==== Taiko ====
The Taiko, in traditional Japanese, refers to any drum. Taiko performances usually use more than one taiko.

== Modern influences ==
=== Before the Second World War ===
(Bi-Musicality In Modern Japanese Culture) Japan's music styles had shifted from their traditional and unique style to a more western approach during the 1870s to 1920s. This resulted in "parallel music cultures", the mixture of both traditional Japanese and Modern western cultures. (Alison Tokita 1).

=== English and Japanese lyrics (bi-Musicality in modern Japanese culture) ===
With westernization taking its toll on modern Japanese culture, the use of the English language has also found it way becoming a part of everyday Japanese speech. With westernized music, the listener must become bilingual in both Japanese and English in order to both understand and appreciate modern Japanese music.

=== Modern Western instruments in Japan ===
Many Japanese artists are well known for the instruments that they play and many of the instruments come from the western world. Masahiro Ando, A Japanese guitarist, is well known for his talent in playing the guitar. Abingdon Boys School, a popular J-Rock boy band, is also popular for their western-style music in Japan.

==== J-Rock ====
J-Rock, or Japanese Rock music, gives a new meaning to modern Japanese music. J-Rock mixes heavy guitar playing and fast-paced drumming along with many English words and phrases thrown around to create a unique new sound. It takes the "western idea of rock" and uses the adrenaline of the Japanese to create this new age of Japanese music.

==== J-Pop ====
J-Pop, or Japanese Pop music, has also grown quite popular in modern Japan. It takes the western idea of pop and mixes it with Japanese style and culture. Along with its singing and dancing, J-Pop shares a lot of the Pop-like qualities in western style music.

== Other ==
"Japan's domestic record industry started in 1927. It was closely tied with the importation of western records." This has heavily influenced the development of modern Japanese music.

In modern Japan, many musicians who use traditional instruments tend to mix traditional Japanese styles with western music, creating new styles of Japanese music. In modern Japanese society, the use of western style music using traditional Japanese instruments is quite popular. ("Traditional Japanese Music"). The band Wagakki Bando is well known for their mixture of traditional instruments with modern western instruments.
