= Cry for the Moon =

Cry for the Moon may refer to:

== Music ==
- "Cry for the Moon" (song), a 1993 song by Mari Hamada
- "Cry for the Moon" (Epica song), a 2003 demo and 2004 single by Epica
- "Cry for the Moon", a song written by Hirō Ooyagi, recorded by Tokio on Advance/Mata Asa ga Kuru in 2010
- "Cry for the Moon", a song written by Hirotaka Izumi, recorded by T-Square on Stars and the Moon in 1984

== Literature ==
- Cry for the Moon, a 1988 novel by Anne Stuart
- Cry for the Moon, a 1970 play by Betty Quin
