= Farewell and Welcome Live 1998 =

Live album by T-Square
- Released: July 18, 1998
- Recorded: April 28, 1998 - Chicken George, Kobe, Japan
- Genre: Jazz Fusion
- Length: 53:33

T-Square chronology
20th Anniversary Special (1998)	Farewell and Welcome Live 1998 (1998)	Sweet & Gentle (1999)

Farewell and Welcome Live 1998 is a live recording by the Japanese Jazz fusion band T-Square released on July 18, 1998 and made available on VHS. The concert was held to bid farewell to Masato Honda and Hirotaka Izumi who were leaving the band, and to welcome their replacements Takahiro Miyazaki and Tadashi Namba.

The Live Concert took place at Chicken George in Kobe, Japan, on April 28, 1998. Many songs were performed on this setlist that were not included on the VHS release.

== Track listing ==
=== VHS ===
No.	Title	Music	Length
1.	"Romantic City"	Masahiro Andoh	6:03
2.	"Bad Moon"	Masato Honda	12:01
3.	"Omens of Love"	Hirotaka Izumi	5:02
4.	"Sailing the Ocean"	Masahiro Andoh	5:47
5.	"Explorer"	Mitsuru Sutoh	5:55
6.	"Jubilee"	Masahiro Andoh	6:44
7.	"Forgotten Saga"	Hirotaka Izumi	12:01

=== Full Performance ===
==== Part 1 ====
1. Megalith
2. Romantic City
3. Play For You
4. Takarajima
5. Bad Moon
6. Omens of Love

==== Part 2 ====
1. The Seven Wonders
2. Sailing The Ocean
3. One Step Beyond
4. Explorer

==== Part 3 ====
1. Miss You
2. Jubilee
3. Truth

==== First Encore ====
1. Forgotten Saga
2. Japanese Soul Brothers

==== Second Encore ====
1. Knight's Song
2. Little Mermaid

== Personnel ==
- Hirotaka Izumi - Keyboards, Acoustic Piano
- Hiroyuki Noritake - Drums
- Masahiro Andoh - Acoustic & Electric guitars
- Masato Honda - Saxophone, EWI
- Mitsuru Sutoh - Bass guitar
- Tadashi Namba - Keyboards
- Takahiro Miyazaki - Saxophone
