= Magic (T-Square album) =

Studio album by T-Square
- Released: November 1, 1981
- Genre: Jazz fusion
- Length: 43:08

T-Square chronology
Rockoon (1980)	Magic (1981)	Temptation of Shapely Legs (1982)

Magic is the fifth studio album by Japanese Jazz fusion band T-Square, who were then known as The Square. It was released on November 1, 1981.

== Track listing ==
All music is composed by Masahiro Andoh, except where noted.

No.	Title	Length
1.	"It's Magic" (lyrics: Linda Hennrick)	5:15
2.	"Chou Chow"	4:09
3.	"I'll Never Forget You" (lyrics: Linda Hennrick)	3:36
4.	"Little Mermaid"	4:15
5.	"Larisa" (music: Daisaku Kume)	4:13
6.	"Chase"	3:06
7.	"Sunshine Sunshine" (music: Daisaku Kume, lyrics: Linda Hennrick)	4:12
8.	"Wandering Soldier"	4:28
9.	"I LUV U" (music: Daisaku Kume, lyrics: Linda Hennrick)	4:18
10.	"Kawaii Techno" (music: Daisaku Kume)	5:36

== See also ==
- 1981 in Japanese music
