= Rockoon (T-Square album) =

Studio album by T-Square
- Released: April 1, 1980
- Genre: Jazz fusion
- Length: 39:04

T-Square chronology
Make Me a Star (1979)	Rockoon (1980)	Magic (1981)

Rockoon is the fourth studio album by Japanese Jazz fusion band T-Square (then known as The Square). It was released on April 1, 1980.

Takeshi Itoh (saxophone player) had begun to use the Lyricon (a Woodwind Synthesizer) in their albums from 1980 until 1987. He switched to Yamaha WX11 and finally to AKAI EWIs in 1988 and has since been using EWIs as a secondary wind instrument.

== Track listing ==
All music is composed by Masahiro Andoh, except where noted

No.	Title	Length
1.	"Rockoon" (music: Masahiro Andoh, Daisaku Kume & Jun Aoyama)	3:14
2.	"Really Love" (lyrics: Linda Hennrick)	4:46
3.	"Tomorrow's Affair"	4:44
4.	"Banana"	4:34
5.	"The Way I Feel" (music: Kiyohiko Semba)	1:53
6.	"Little Pop Sugar"	6:54
7.	"Come Back" (lyrics: Linda Hennrick)	3:51
8.	"It's Happening Again" (lyrics: Linda Hennrick)	3:32
9.	"Good Night"	5:36

== Personnel ==
- Masahiro Andoh – guitars
- Takeshi Itoh – alto saxophone, flute, Lyricon and vocoder
- Daisaku Kume – keyboards and synthesizer arrangements
- Yuhji Nakamura – bass guitar and Moog bass
- Jun Aoyama – drums
- Kiyohiko Semba – percussion and vocals
- Masato Kohara – vocals on "Really Love", "Come Back", and "It's Happening Again"

== See also ==
- 1980 in Japanese music
