= Make Me a Star =

Make Me a Star may refer to:

- Make Me a Star (film), a 1932 American pre-Code romantic comedy film
- Make Me a Star (album), a 1979 album by The Square
- Make Me a Star (song), a song by KC and the Sunshine Band
