= Jungle Strut =

Single by T-Square
- Released: 1982
- Genre: Jazz fusion
- Length: 3:30
- Composer(s): Daisaku Kume & Kiyohiko Semba

"Jungle Strut" is a single by Japanese jazz fusion band T-Square, who were then known as the Square. The single was released in 1982 and included as a demonstration tape in newly purchased Sony Walkman cassette players.
