= Jun Fukamachi =

Jun Fukamachi 深町純
- Born: May 21, 1946; Tokyo, Japan
- Died: November 22, 2010 (aged 64)
- Genres: Jazz fusion, J-pop, Progressive Rock
- Occupations: Composer, musician
- Instruments: Piano, keyboards
- Years active: 1971–2010
- Label: Alfa
- Website: fukamachijun.jp

Jun Fukamachi (深町 純, Fukamachi Jun; May 21, 1946 – November 22, 2010) was a Japanese jazz fusion composer, arranger, and keyboardist. He played with The Brecker Brothers and Steve Gadd and released albums for Polydor and Toshiba in the 1970s.

== Early life and career ==
At the age of 3, Fukamachi began to learn piano. After attending Izumi High School, he began landing production deals. He dropped out of Tokyo National University of Fine Arts and Music just prior to graduating.

In 1971, he signed to Polydor Records for the release of his debut album, A Portrait of a Young Man. Following this, he worked as composer and keyboard player of jazz fusion.

Since the early 1970s he began to use synthesizers to create numerous albums such as Quark (1980), in particular using the Yamaha CS-01 breath controller technique.

In 1989, he was appointed Professor of Scooter Gakuen University Music School and founded Japan's first synthesizer major.

== Death ==
On November 22, 2010, he died of a pericardial hematoma due to aortic dissection.

== Discography ==
=== As leader ===
- A Portrait of a Young Man (Polydor, 1971)
- Piano Solo Best of Beatles (Polydor, 1972)
- Hello (Polydor, 1972)
- Now Sound Christmas (Polydor, 1972)
- Piano Solo Screen Music 10 (Polydor, 1973)
- Rokuyu (Express, 1975)
- Silver Fish (Polydor, 1975)
- Introducing Jun Fukamachi (Toshiba, 1975)
- Spiral Steps (Kitty, 1976)
- Jun Fukamachi at Steinway (Toshiba, 1976)
- Jun Fukamachi at the Steinway (Take 2) (Toshiba, 1976)
- Together with Jun/Martha Miyake (Toshiba, 1976)
- Sgt. Pepper's Lonely Hearts Club Band (Toshiba, 1977)
- Crystal City (Philips, 1977)
- The Sea of Dirac (Kitty, 1977)
- Triangle Session (Kitty, 1977)
- Second Phase (Toshiba, 1977)
- Evening Star (Kitty, 1978)
- Live (Alfa, 1978)
- On the Move (Alfa, 1978)
- Fantastic Suite: A Dream On a Spring Night (Toshiba, 1978)
- Riverside (Alfa, 1979)
- Wonderland (Alfa, 1980)
- Quark (Alfa, 1980)
- Fusion Synthesizer (Express, 1980)
- The Soundtrack Mishione (Columbia, 1980)
- Solo Vol. 1 (Vap, 1983)
- Remember to Remember (Kitty, 1983)
- Yamato Final Synthesizer Fantasy (Columbia, 1983)
- Queen Emeraldus Synthesizer Fantasy (Columbia, 1983)
- Daisy Chain (Climax, 1983)
- Digital Trip Urusei Yatsura (Animex, 1984)
- Yellow Moon (TDK, 1984)
- Jun Fukamachi Meets Takashi Sato (Eastworld, 1986)
- Spiral Steps (Kitty, 1992)
- Variation of Variation (Kosei, 1996)
- Midnight Dive (J-one, 1998)
- Civilization (J-one, 1999)
- Winter (Network, 2001)
- Autumn (Network, 2001)
- Summer (Network, 2001)
- Spring (Network, 2002)
- Calm (Network, 2002)
- Piano World (GT Music, 2003)
- Marriage (GT Music, 2004)
- Taizo (Finger, 2004)
- Last Nocturne (Universal, 2012)
- Recital at Suntory Hall (Jun Fukamachi, 2017)

=== As sideman ===
With Prism

- Nothin' Unusual (TDK, 1985)
- Dreamin (SMS, 1986)
- The Silence of the Motion (SMS, 1987)
- Live Alive Vol. 2 (SMS, 1987)

With others

- Casiopea, Super Flight (Alfa, 1979)
- Benard Ighner, Little Dreamer (Alfa, 1978)
- Tatsuya Nakamura, Locus (Sea Horse, 1984)
- Masayoshi Takanaka, Takanaka (Kitty, 1977)
- Masayoshi Takanaka, An Insatiable High (Kitty, 1977)
- Kyohei Tsutsumi, Hit Machine (Toshiba, 1976)
- Kazumi Watanabe, Mermaid Boulevard (Alfa, 1978)
