= Make Me a Star (album) =

Studio album by T-Square
- Released: June 21, 1979
- Recorded: March–April 1979
- Studio: CBS Studios
- Genre: Jazz fusion
- Length: 37:14

T-Square chronology
Midnight Lover (1978)	Make Me a Star (1979)	Rockoon (1980)

Make Me A Star is the third album by Japanese jazz fusion band "The Square" (which changed its name to T-Square in 1989), recorded and released in 1979. This is also the first album on which saxophonist Takeshi Itoh used the Lyricon.

== Track listing ==
All music is composed by Masahiro Andoh

No.	Title	Length
1.	"Mr Coco's One"	7:12
2.	"Make Me A Star"	5:35
3.	"Life Is A Music"	6:33
4.	"Stiff Nails"	3:23
5.	"Love Forever"	3:26
6.	"I Will Sing A Lullaby"	4:15
7.	"Texas Kid"	6:50

== Personnel ==
- Masahiro Andoh – guitars
- Takeshi Itoh – alto saxophone, Lyricon
- Junko Miyagi – acoustic piano, Rhodes piano, Korg MS-20, PS-3100, Hohner D6 Clavinet, Oberheim, Minimoog, ARP Odyssey, Yamaha CS-80
- Yuhji Nakamura – bass
- Michael S. Kawai – drums, percussion, voice
- Kiyohiko Senba – percussion, congas, tsuzumi, ōtsuzumi, shime-daiko, synthesizer percussion, glockenspiel
- Shirō Sagisu – conductor, music arrangement (strings and brass section), Oberheim, Yamaha CS-80
- Kayoko Ishu Group – vocals on "Mr. Coco's One", "Make Me A Star" and "Life is a Music"
- Shin Kazuhara Group – trumpet on "Make Me A Star"
- Eiji Arai Group – trombone on "Make Me A Star"
- Tadaaki Obuo Strings – strings on "Make Me A Star" and "I Will Sing A Lullaby"

== See also ==
- 1979 in Japanese music
