= Impressive (album) =

Studio album by T-Square
- Released: April 22, 1992
- Genre: Jazz fusion
- Length: 53:40

T-Square chronology
New-S (1991)	Impressive (1992)	Human (1993)

Rerelease cover

Impressive is the seventeenth studio album by Japanese jazz fusion band T-Square, released on April 22, 1992. The album was released with 2 different cover versions, both shown in the info box.

== Track listing ==
No.	Title	Music	Length
1.	"Faces"	Masahiro Andoh	5:12
2.	"11月の雨" (November Rain)	Hirotaka Izumi	6:55
3.	"Rise"	Masahiro Andoh	6:04
4.	"Mac's Back"	Masahiro Andoh	5:42
5.	"Broken Promise"	Masato Honda	6:33
6.	"Dandelion Hill"	Hirotaka Izumi	5:18
7.	"Traffic Jam"	Masato Honda	6:06
8.	"Amaranth"	Masahiro Andoh	6:23
9.	"待ちぼうけの午後" (Afternoon Waiting in Vain)	Masato Honda	5:31
