= Prism (Japanese band) =

Japanese jazz fusion band

- Origin: Japan
- Genres: Jazz fusion; jazz rock; progressive rock
- Years active: 1975–2018 (Note: De facto hiatus)
- Labels: Polydor; Warner Bros. Records; Moon Records; TDK Records; Sounds Marketing System, Inc.; Bandai; MELDAC; UMG; Beat On Beat
- Past members: Akira Wada (ja); Ken Watanabe (ja); Toru "Rika" Suzuki; Katsutoshi Morizono; Daisaku Kume (ja); Koki "Corky" Ito (ja); Masahiro Sayama (ja); Shuichi "Ponta" Murakami (ja); Jun Aoyama (ja); Satoshi Nakamura (ja); Jun Fukamachi (ja); Yoshikazu Matsuura; Satoshi "Mansaku" Kimura (ja); Jiro Okada; Tatsuya "Cheru" Watanabe (ja)
- Website: prismjapan.com

Prism (プリズム, Purizumu) was a Japanese jazz fusion band formed in 1975.

== History ==
Prism was formed in 1975 by Akira Wada and Ken Watanabe. In 1976, the group were signed to Polydor Records and toured nationwide. Prism released their debut album in 1977, Prism, which ran out of stock after its release. Shortly after, the band went on to support Eric Clapton at the Budokan. Their 1986 song 'Take Off' was featured in a Mild Seven commercial.

== Members ==
The band's final line-up was composed of Jiro Okada (bass), Satoshi "Mansaku" Kimura (drums), Akira Wada (guitar) and Tatsuya "Cheru" Watanabe (keyboards, vocals) as of their suspension of activities in 2018. On March 28, 2021, Wada died at the age of 64.

== Discography ==
Prism have released a total of 25 studio albums and 10 live albums since 1977. The band was signed to Universal Music Group in 2003, which re-released the band's first four albums, and remained their record publisher.

- Prism (1977)
- Second Thoughts/Second Move (1978)
- Prism III (1979)
- Prism Live (1979)
- Surprise (1980)
- Community Illusion (1981)
- Live Alive (Absolutely) (1981)
- Visions (1982)
- ∞（永久機関） (1983)
- Nothin' Unusual (1985)
- Dreamin (1986)
- Live Alive Vol. 2 (1987)
- The Silence of the Motion (1987)
- Mother Earth (1990)
- Rejuvenation (1991)
- A Personal Change (1992)
- Prism Jam (1995)
- Uncovered (1995)
- Prismania (1997)
- Whiter (1997)
- In the Last Resort (2001)
- Present I (2003)
- Present II (2003)
- 【Mju:】 (2003)
- 1977 Live at Sugino Kodo (2004)
- Homecoming 2004 (2004)
- 三位一体 (2005)
- Blue... (2007)
- Prism 30th Anniversary Live! [Homecoming] (2007)
- Prism Homecoming Vol. 3 (2008)
- Invite (2009)
- Palace in the Sky (2011)
- Mode:Odd (2013)
- Celebrate (2017)
- What You See (2017)
