= Masato Honda =

Japanese musician and composer

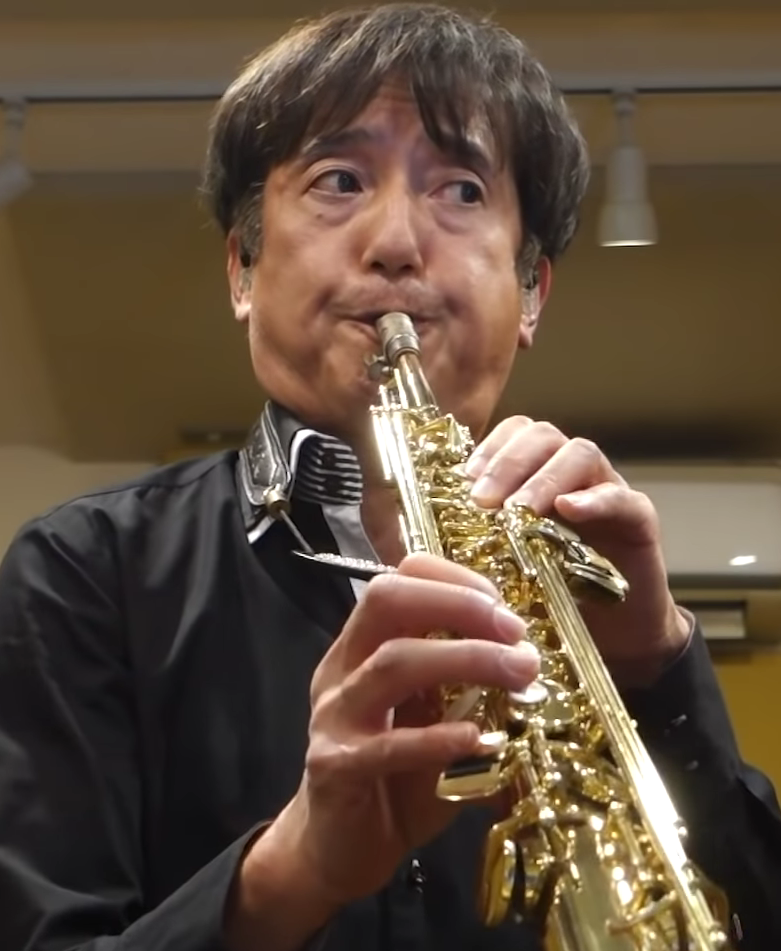
- Honda performing in 2020

Background information
- Born: November 13, 1962 (age 63); Nakamura, Kōchi (now Shimanto, Kōchi), Japan
- Genre: Jazz fusion
- Occupation: Musician
- Instrument: Saxophone
- Member of: T-Square
- Website: http://www.ciao-ciao-ciao.com/

Masato Honda (本田 雅人, Honda Masato; born November 13, 1962) is a Japanese saxophone player, composer, and multi-instrumentalist. Born in Nakamura City, Kochi Prefecture (now Shimanto City), he graduated from Kunitachi College of Music. He is most well known for being a member of the band T-Square and appearing on Cowboy Bebop's soundtrack with The Seatbelts.

== Biography ==
=== Early life and career ===
Masato Honda started playing the saxophone in the 3rd grade under the influence of his father, after trying out both the flute and clarinet. During his high school years at the Kochi Prefectural Nakamura High School he participated in a pop band where he played guitar and sang. Afterwards, he went to Kunitachi College of Music, where he studied classical saxophone until he won the 14th Yamano Big Band Jazz Contest in 1983. Afterwards, he turned his focus to jazz and fusion styles. In 1985, he graduated from Kunitachi College of Music at the top of his class and joined Nobuo Hara's Sharps and Flats. Afterwards, he worked as a session musician, notably working with Toshiki Kadomatsu, Hiroshi Sato, and the Katsumi Horii Project, and formed the group WITNESS with Masaharu Ishikawa and Jun Kajiwara.

=== T-Square ===
The 1990 live, T-Square Live (featuring F1 Grand Prix Theme) was Honda's first time working with T-Square as a session musician. The then-current saxophonist Takeshi Itoh stepped down from the group to pursue a solo career soon after.

Honda debuted as an official member in T-Square Live – "Farewell & Welcome" in 1991, which was Itoh's official send-off from the group. Prior to this, Honda began recording his first studio album with T-Square in January 1991, New-S, where he composed the opening track, Megalith. It would release on March 21 that same year. Also in 1991, the group recorded the album Refreshest, the first album under the name "T-Square and Friends". It was composedly mainly of arrangements of previous songs, one of which was a version of It's Magic. Following the death of racing legend Ayrton Senna in 1994, T-Square released SOLITUDE, also as T-Square and Friends. Overseas musicians such as David Liebman, Michael Brecker, and Mike Stern joined T-Square and Friends for the album Miss you in New York in 1995.

After the album Blue in Red, Honda left T-Square for unknown reasons and pursued a solo career. He participated before leaving T-Square in Farewell & Welcome Live 1998, which was recorded on April 28, 1998 and released on VHS the following July, and he also participated after leaving T-Square in Yaon de Asobu – 20th Anniversary Special. Berklee alum Takahiro Miyazaki replaced him starting with the album Gravity, however Honda still contributed to it, playing on the song Japanese Soul Brothers.

T-Square's 2022 album Wish marked his first activity with the band since he contributed a composition in their 2001 album Brasil, and T-Square's 2022 year-end special live shows saw his return to the band's stage for the first time since he guest performed in 2000.

=== Other work ===
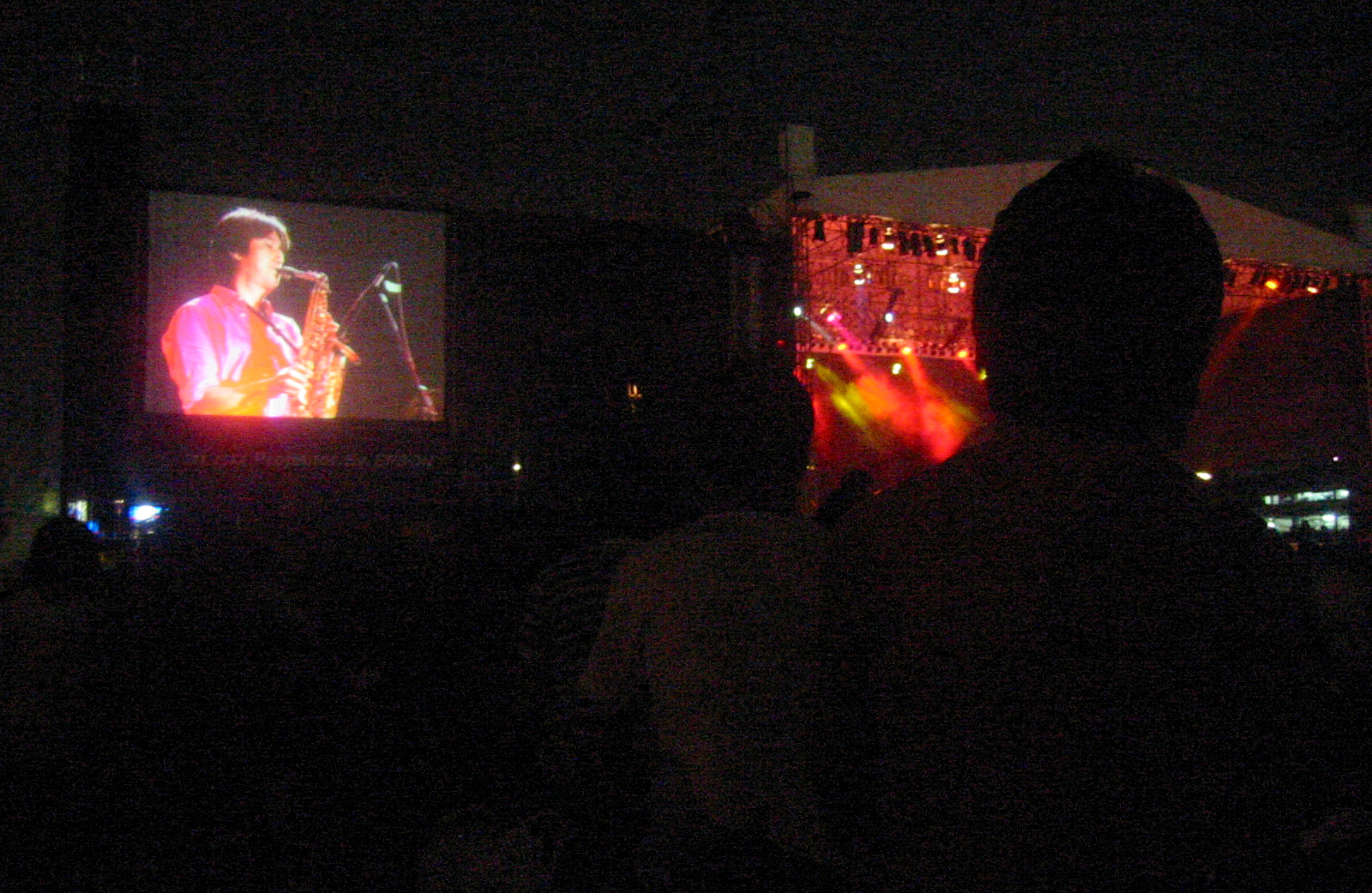
Honda performing at Bangkok Jazz Festival, 2005.

Honda has participated in the works of Shiro Sagisu, Ringo Sheena, Hiroshi Sato, Toshiki Kadomatsu, L'Arc-en-Ciel, Kukeiha Club, FictionJunction, Kohei Tanaka, Motoaki Furukawa, SunSet Swish, Nana Mizuki, Aiko, Yuji Toriyama, Masayuki Suzuki, Yui Makino, Sumire Uesaka, Junna, Ryo Takahashi, and Round Table

He has also recorded for the soundtracks of Cowboy Bebop, Souryuden, Gunstar Heroes, Tenchi-Muyo! Ryo-Ohki, Mega Man X, Arc the Lad, F-Zero X, Shenmue, Napple Tale, Gensō Suikogaiden, Ghost in the Shell: Stand Alone Complex, Detective Conan: Strategy Above the Depths, Detective Conan: The Private Eyes' Requiem, Angel Heart, Wild Arms, Detective Conan: Jolly Roger in the Deep Azure, Hayate the Combat Butler, Dengeki Gakuen RPG: Cross of Venus, Pandora Hearts, Evangelion Wind Symphony, One Piece, Cute High Earth Defense Club Love!, Cat Planet Cuties, Negima! Magister Negi Magi, Heaven's Memo Pad, Listen to Me, Girls. I Am Your Father!, Kids on the Slope, Nyaruko: Crawling with Love, The Third, Sound! Euphonium, Showa Genroku Rakugo Shinju, Wake Up, Girls!, Prison School, Active Raid: Special Public Security Fifth Division Third Mobile Assault Eighth Unit, Journey of Midgard/Michiko Naruke Ragnarok Online, ACCA 13-ku Kansatsu-ka, Square Enix Jazz Final Fantasy, City Hunter: Shinjuku Private Eyes, Code Geass Lelouch of the Rebellion Orchestra Concert, and Arifureta: From Commonplace to World's Strongest.

Since his work with T-Square, he has led and been a part of several other bands. Honda founded the group B.B.Station as a "train station" between the styles of jazz fusion and swing music. Trumpeter Eric Miyashiro is part of this group. Honda has also been a member of the Blue Note Tokyo All-Star Jazz Orchestra that Miyashiro leads. Honda has been in a number of other fusion acts besides T-Square such as Four of a Kind, which participated in the 2004 JVC Jazz Festival in Seoul, and Voice of Elements, which live-streamed performances because of the COVID-19 pandemic. In his 2008 solo album, Across the Groove, he featured jazz keyboardist Bob James. Also significant is his second solo album, Carry Out, in which he played every instrument and composed every song on the record.

Honda is a visiting professor at Showa University of Music. He was previously employed by Kunitachi College of Music as a professor of saxophone and jazz. His name was removed from the faculty list in 2020.

== Instruments ==
Honda has experience on a variety of instruments. Aside from the four main soprano, alto, tenor and baritone saxophones he has been observed playing the clarinet, flute, EWI, guitar, bass guitar, keyboards, trumpet, flugelhorn, trombone, and recorder. He also has ability as a jazz scat singer. He even played all instruments from his second solo album, Carry Out.

On the alto saxophone he uses a refaced 7* Yanagisawa mouthpiece, as well as a model made specifically for him by the brand Saxz, and a Meyer 5M. He used a Selmer Mark VII saxophone for most of his career, but switched to the more renowned Mark VI at some point in the 2010s and currently uses a Yamaha YAS-875EX. For his time in T-Square during the 90s, he primarily used a synthetic Fibracell reed, but now uses Vandoren's Green Java reeds. On the EWI he started using an Akai EWI during his run with T-Square, and switched to a Berglund NuRAD after three decades of usage.

== Discography ==
=== As leader ===
- Shimanto-gawa moyō (四万十川もよう; 1996)
- Growin (A-Pro C&C, 1998)
- Carry Out (JVC, 1999)
- Real-Fusion (JVC, 2000)
- Illusion (Note: Collaboration album with Ponta Box) (JVC, 2000)
- Cross Hearts (JVC, 2001)
- What is Fusion (JVC, 2001)
- The Best and More (2002)
- Crowded Colors (JVC, 2003)
- Assemble a Crew (JVC, 2004)
- Masato Honda with Voice of Elements (Kang & Music, 2006)
- Across the Groove (RCA, 2008)
- Solid State Funk (Sony, 2009)
- Saxes Street (GRP, 2015)

=== With T-Square ===
- T-Square Live – Featuring F-1 Grand Prix Theme (Note: Album in which Masato Honda performs as a Session Player and not as a Lead Saxophonist within T-Square.) (1990)
- New-S (1991)
- T-Square Live – Farewell & Welcome (1991)
- Megalith (1991)
- Refreshest (1991)
- F-1 Grand Prix World (1992)
- Impressive (1992)
- Classics (1992)
- Human (1993)
- Club Circuit "Human" (1993)
- Harmony (1993)
- Summer Planet (1994)
- Harmony (Live) (1994)
- SOLITUDE (1994)
- Takarajima (1995)
- Welcome to the Rose Garden (1995)
- Miss you in New York (1995)
- T-Square and Friends Live in Tokyo (1995)
- B.C.A.D. (1996)
- Blue in Red (1997)
- Gravity (1998)
- Farewell & Welcome Live 1998 (1998)
- Yaon de Asobu – 20th Anniversary Special (1998)
- WISH (2022)
- Welcome Back, Masato Honda! (2023)
- VENTO DE FELICIDADE (2023)
- T-Square 45th Anniversary Celebration Concert (2024)

=== With Four of a Kind ===
- Introducing Four of a Kind (2002)
- Four of a Kind (2002)
- Four of a Kind Live At Blue Note Tokyo And Osaka Blue Note (2002)
- Four of a Kind II (2004)

=== With Witness ===
- Witness (1988)
- Witness Live (2005)

=== With B.B. Station ===
- B.B. Station Live at Roppongi Pit Inn (2000)
- Jazz'n Out Marlene Meets Masato Honda (2007)

== See also ==
- T-Square (band)
- Casiopea
- Eric Marienthal
