= Hiroyuki Noritake =

Japanese drummer and lecturer

Hiroyuki Noritake 則竹裕之
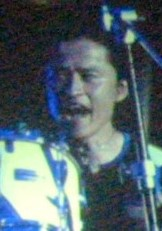
- Noritake performing in Bangkok, 2005

Background information
- Born: August 27, 1964 (age 62); Kawanishi, Hyōgo, Japan
- Genres: Jazz fusion
- Occupations: Drummer; lecturer at the Showa Academia Musicae
- Instrument: Drums
- Years active: 1985–present
- Education: Kobe University

Hiroyuki Noritake (則竹裕之, Noritake Hiroyuki; born August 27, 1964) is a Japanese jazz fusion drummer and a lecturer at the Showa Academia Musicae.

== Career ==
Noritake started playing drums under the influence of his father, who was a jazz drummer, and joined jazz-fusion band T-Square after being scouted in 1985 while attending Kobe University. He has appeared in the Playboy Jazz Festival and has won the Japan Gold Disc Award for the Jazz category ten times.

Noritake left T-Square with bassist Mitsuru Sutoh, saxophonist Takahiro Miyazaki, and keyboardist Keiji Matsumoto when the group disbanded temporarily in 2000. He has participated in live performances and recordings as a support member for the band as well as for former member Masato Honda's band and solo career. Noritake is active in other sessions such as Aonori with Tomohito Aoki, who became familiar with Honda's support. In addition, he learned how to compose during his time as a drummer for T-Square and provided tracks like "Yuh-Ja."

In 2004, he formed Synchronized DNA, a twin drum unit with former Casiopea drummer Akira Jimbo. At the end of the same year, he participated in Casiopea's tour, in which Jimbo was now a supporting member, as Synchronized DNA. In 2005, he released the DVD "Double Drum Performance" and went on a live house tour to commemorate it. In July, he rejoined the Casiopea tour. The unit toured in Canada and performed at the Montreal Drum Festival. In 2006, along with Honda on saxophone, Keiji Matsumoto on keyboard, and Mitsuru Sutoh on bass, they formed Masato Honda with Voice of Elements, a band in which all members were former T-Square members.

In addition to leading the Japanese jazz fusion world as a regular member of the Sadao Watanabe Quintet, Kazumi Watanabe Jazz Return Project, and Dimension, he has been a supporting member of pop singer Ayaka Hirahara's backing band since 2010.

Noritake, along with fellow T-Square drummer Satoshi Bandoh, are both featured on several tracks of the Mario Kart 8 soundtrack.
