= Hirotaka Izumi =

Japanese musical artist (1958–2021)

Hirotaka Izumi 和泉宏隆
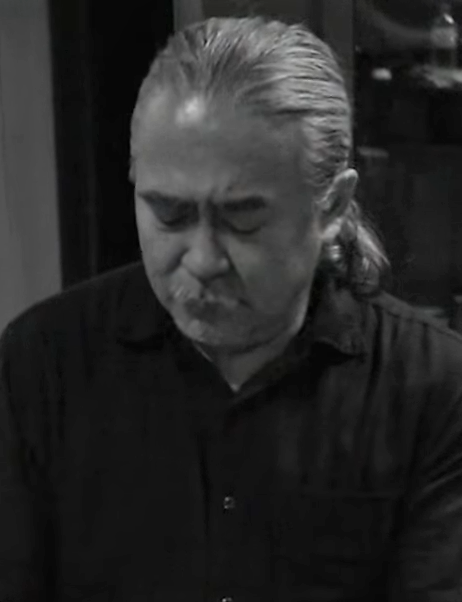
- Izumi performing in 2018

Background information
- Born: September 28, 1958; Tokyo, Japan
- Died: April 26, 2021 (aged 62)
- Genres: Jazz; jazz fusion
- Occupations: Keyboardist; pianist; composer
- Instruments: Piano; electric piano; synthesizer
- Years active: 1982–2021
- Labels: MistyFountain (Solo Career), CBS/Sony (1982-97, as a member of T-Square)
- Education: Keio University

Hirotaka Izumi (和泉宏隆, Izumi Hirotaka; September 28, 1958 – April 26, 2021) was a Japanese keyboardist, pianist, and composer who was a former member of the jazz fusion band T-Square. Besides T-Square, he was also active in the bands Pyramid (ピラミッド) and Voyage (ヴォヤージュ).

== Early life and education ==
Izumi was born in Tokyo, Japan on September 28, 1958. He started playing the piano at the age of four and, after listening to Bill Evans, aspired to become a jazz pianist. He attended Keio Senior High School where he was a part of the Jazz Circle of the school's Keio Light Music Society along with drummer Akira Jimbo. After graduating, he attended Keio University and graduated from the Faculty of Law, Department of Law.

== Career ==
Throughout 1981, Hirotaka Izumi appeared as a session keyboardist in J-Pop albums by singers Junko Mihara, Mayuki Masaka and Naomi Akimoto, to name a few. In 1982, he joined the jazz fusion band The Square, later known as T-Square. He became their keyboardist and made his debut with their sixth studio album Temptation of Shapely Legs. At the same time of his debut, he was working on the Fuji TV show Waratte Iitomo!. He stayed in the band until departing in 1998, and during his 16 years he was in charge of piano, synthesizer, composition, arrangement, horn arrangement, and strings arrangement, playing a central role in the band's sound.

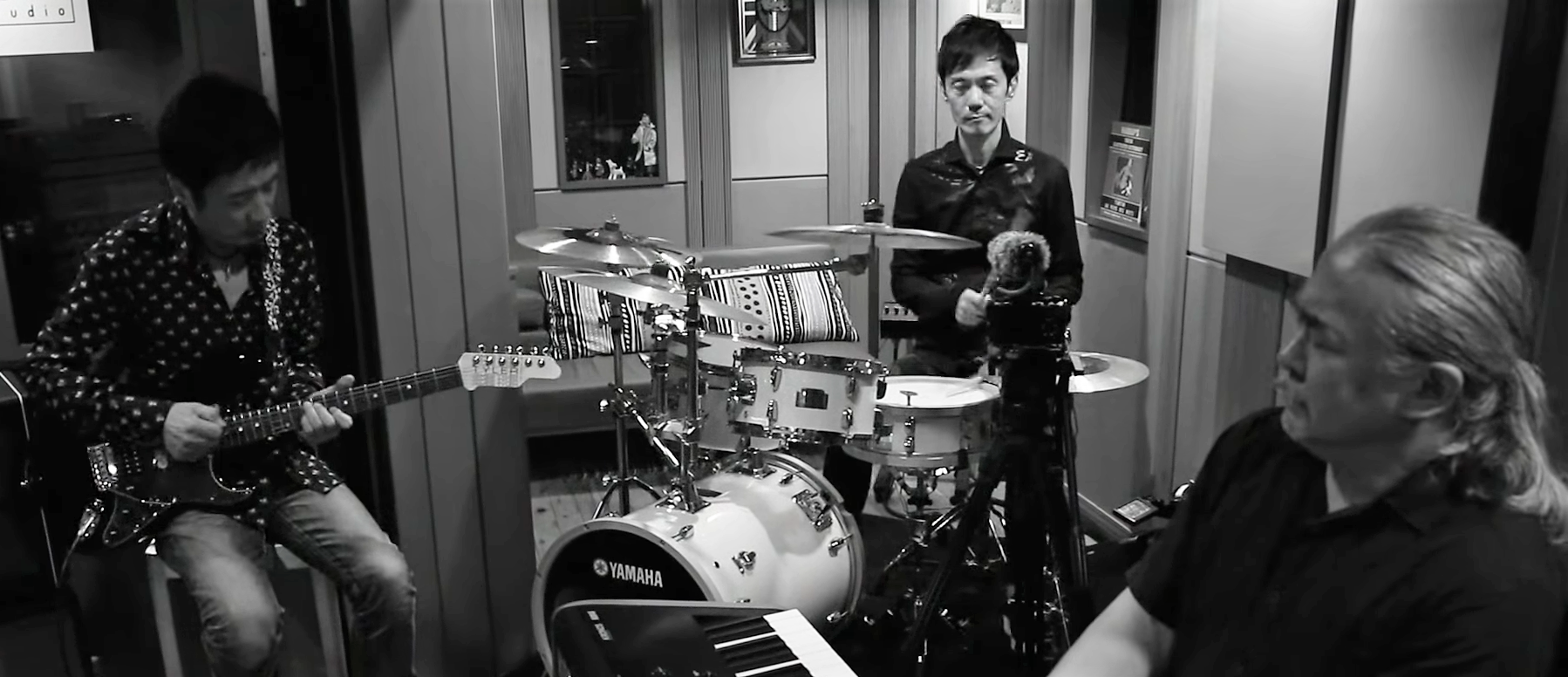
Izumi (right) performing with Akira Jimbo (center) and Yuji Toriyama (left) in 2018.

In 1997, he released his first solo album Forgotten Saga, and with it, became concentrated on playing piano, and left the group with the "Farewell & Welcome" tour the following year. After that, he continued to produce solo albums up until 2005 with the album Hirotaka Izumi Covers Love Songs. In the same year, guitarist Yuji Toriyama formed a band with drummer Akira Jimbo and Izumi, calling themselves Pyramid. He also started playing in a band called Voyage with guitarist Issei Noro and percussionist Saori Sendō.

Even after leaving T-Square, he continued to work with the members and occasionally participated in their recording sessions.

His 16-year tenure in the band (1982 to 1998) is the second longest regarding keyboardists (with Keizoh Kawano in T-Square from 2000 to 2020) and 5th-longest overall, with drummer Satoshi Bandoh being in the band from 2004 to the present day, saxophonist Takeshi Itoh being in the band on two separate stints (1977-1990 and 2000–Present Day) and Guitarist Masahiro Andoh being a member of the band since its creation (1976 to 2021).

In 2007, he formed a trio with bassist Kiyoshi Murakami and drummer Masami Itagaki. Since then, the focus of his activities had been shifted to this trio, releasing four albums by 2009 starting with the album Lights in a Distance and also touring nationwide while continuing as a solo artist. According to the Misty Fountain Hirotaka Izumi blog, the trio disbanded in the summer of 2010 and was restarted in October with bassist Komobuchi Kiichirou and drummer Masaharu Ishikawa.

In 2012, he formed the group The Water Colors with bassist Keisuke Torigoe and drummer Masaharu Ishikawa, with Torigoe being replaced by bassist Hiroshi Yoshino in 2016. He also formed a duo with guitarist Kazuhiko Iwami called the Twilight Express Duo. In 2017, he and former T-Square members Andoh, Itoh, Toyoyuki Tanaka, Toru Hasebe reunited as The Square Reunion 1982–1985 "The Legend" and Andoh, Ito, Izumi, Mitsuru Sutoh, and Hiroyuki Noritake reunited as The Square Reunion 1987–1990 "Fantastic History." In 2019, he announced the album Complete Solo Piano Works, a comprehensive project of his works produced through all musical activities as a pianist in a solo arrangement. In August 2020, he opened a YouTube channel.

On April 28, 2021, it was announced on the official website that he died of acute heart failure, with his funeral held only by close relatives. Because of many inquiries, it was announced on May 2 of the same year that videos including unreleased live video would be distributed for free via YouTube premiere.
