= Takeshi Itoh =

Takeshi Itō 伊東 たけし
- Itō in 2026.

Background information
- Born: March 15, 1954 (age 72); Fukuoka, Fukuoka Prefecture, Japan
- Genre: Jazz fusion
- Instruments: Saxophone; Lyricon; EWI; NuRAD; Flute
- Years active: 1976–present
- Member of: T-Square

Takeshi Itō (伊東 毅, Itō Takeshi; born March 15, 1954) is a Japanese jazz fusion saxophonist and flute player. He is currently a part of the jazz fusion band T-Square.

== Biography ==
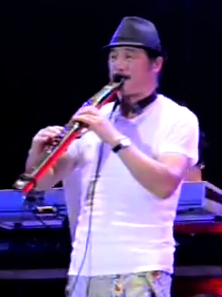
Itō performing with a wind controller in 2012.

=== Early life and career ===
Itō had been interested in music since he was a child, leaning how to play piano and violin. At Momochi Junior High School, he joined a brass band with a euphonium and tuba. He entered Seinan Gakuin High School and chose to become a flute player, but after reading Sadao Watanabe 's autobiography, Boku Jishin no Tame no Jazz, he turned to alto saxophone.

He entered the Nihon University College of Art and belonged to the Rhythm Society Orchestra. At the same time, he joined the bands Witch Hunt and Last Day. The drummer of Witch Hunt, Michael Seiichi Kawai, was also the drummer for a band called The Square, led by guitarist Masahiro Andō, and Itō made guest appearances due to this connection. After the disbandment of Witch Hunt, he joined The Square in 1977.

=== Debut and The Square ===
Ater joining The Square in 1977, Itō appeared in various commercials, including for the Japanese whiskey Suntory White, as the band gained popularity.

In 1984, he released his debut solo album, Dear Hearts. In 1985, he released his second album L7. In 1988, he released his third album T.K. This album marked his first use of the stage name Takeshi "T.K." Itō. He chose this name because he thought his first name, Takeshi, would be difficult for people in English-speaking countries to pronounce. In each of these three albums, he collaborated with French composer and keyboardist Philippe Saisse. Although these solo albums were published separately from his work with The Square, he remained an active member of the band for several years.

=== Solo career ===
In 1990, he left T-Square (formerly The Square) to pursue a solo career. From the years 1992-2000, he published eight studio albums, continuing under his "T.K." stage name. During this solo career, he worked with various American jazz and hip-hop musicians.

=== Return to T-Square ===
Itō returned as saxophonist and EWI player for T-Square in late 2000. Around the time of his return, T-Square had split into two separate groups: Trio The Square (with bassist Mitsuru Sutō, drummer Hiroyuki Noritake and keyboardist Keiji Matsumoto) and T-Square (with Itō, guitarist Masahiro Andō and session musicians). From 2004 and onward, T-Square relied on newer, now full-time band members.

In 2007, he released the album Mellow Madness, his first solo album in seven years. The album was produced by Japanese keyboardist Jun Abe. Itō did not reprise the "T.K." stage name for this album or any other solo projects after this point.

In 2014, after another seven years, he released the album Favorites, with Jun Abe returning as producer.

In 2021, Masahiro Ando left T-Square, making Itō and drummer Satoshi Bandoh the only full-time members. They both would take over management of the band going forward. In 2025, keyboardist Yuichi Hasegawa, guitarist Shuya Kameyama, and longtime session bassist Shingo Tanaka were made full-time members alongside Itō and Bandoh.

In November 2026, it was announced that Itō would be releasing his first new solo album in fourteen years, Sapé. This album features several LA-based musicians, including Itō's past collaborator Philippe Saisse, who is the album's producer.

== Discography ==
=== Studio albums ===
Year	Album	Label
1984	Dear Hearts	CBS/Sony
1985	L7	CBS/Sony
1988	T.K.	Columbia
1992	Visions	Atlantic
1993	T.K. LA	Atlantic
1994	Groove Island	Atlantic
1995	T.K. Covers	Atlantic
1996	T.K. Breeze	EastWest
1997	Scare Headline	EastWest
1999	Double Circle	Kitty
2000	Turn Over	Kitty
2007	Mellow Madness	Village
2014	Favorites	Sony
2026	Sapé	Orange lady
