= Masahiro Andoh =

Japanese guitarist, composer

Masahiro Andō 安藤 正容
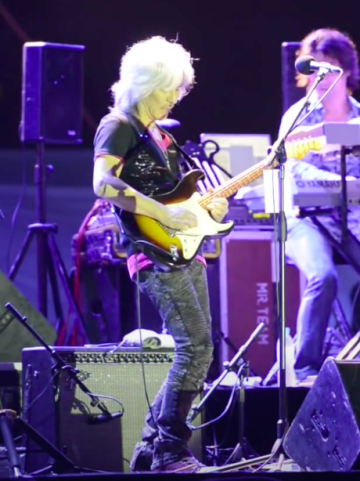

Background information
- Also known as: Andō-san
- Born: September 16, 1954 (age 71); Nagoya, Aichi, Japan
- Genres: Jazz fusion
- Occupations: Composer, guitarist
- Instrument: Guitar
- Years active: 1976–present
- Labels: Sony Music Japan, Orange Lady (also a Subsidiary of SMJ)

Masahiro Andō (安藤 正容, Andō Masahiro; born September 16, 1954) is a Japanese composer and guitarist from Chikusa-ku, Nagoya, Aichi Prefecture, Japan. From 1976 to 2021, he was the guitarist and leader of the Japanese jazz-fusion band T-Square. He was also one-third of Ottottrio, a supergroup led by three Japanese guitarists: himself, Hirokuni Korekata of Rocket Jam and Issei Noro of Casiopea.

Andō was also commissioned to create the music for Arc the Lad: Twilight of the Spirits and Gran Turismo. He is one of the performers for the band's composition, "Truth", the theme tune for Fuji Television's Formula One World Championship coverage (which started in use in 1987) and the F-1 Grand Prix video game series.

On February 1, 2021, Andō announced that he would leave T-Square following the release of their next album and tour.

== Discography ==
=== As a member of The Square/T-Square ===
- Lucky Summer Lady (1978)
- Midnight Lover (1978)
- Make Me a Star (1979)
- Rockoon (1980)
- Magic (1981)
- Temptation of Legs (1982)
- The Water of the Rainbow (1983)
  - Both Temptation of Legs and The Water of the Rainbow were marketed under their native Japanese names.
- Adventures (1984)
- Stars and the Moon (1984)
- RESORT (1985)
- SPORTS (1986)
- Truth (1987)
  - The song from which this album gets its name, "Truth", and its various remixes, such as "Truth 1991" (with Masato Honda instead of Takeshi Itoh), "Truth 21c" (2001, with Takeshi Itoh, as T-Square Plus), "Truth" (Drum and Bass Remix featuring Resonance-T, 2003), "Truth" (20th Anniversary Version, featuring Evolution-K, 2006), were used as opening themes for Japan's F1 races from 1987 to 1998, from 2001 to 2006, and starting in 2012.
- Yes, No (1988)
- Wave (1989)
- Natural (1990)
- NEW-S (1991)
- Refreshest (1991)
- F-1 Grand Prix World (1992)
- Impressive (1992)
- Classics (1992)
- Human (1993)
- Harmony (1993)
- Summer Planet (1994)
  - Marketed under its Japanese name.
- Solitude (1994)
- Takarajima (1995)
- Welcome to the Rose Garden (1995)
- Miss You In New York (1995)
- B.C. A.D. (1996)
- Blue in Red (1997)
- Gravity (1998)
- Sweet & Gentle (1999)
- T-Square (2000)
- Friendship (2000)
- Brasil (2001)
  - This album featured a song named A Distancia, a song originally written by ex-T-Square Saxophonist Masato Honda, however Takeshi Itoh played on this Track. Masato Honda released his own version on Cross Hearts, which was his Fifth Solo album.
- Truth 21 Century (2001)
  - This album includes an arrangement of the song "Truth" from the 1987 album of the same name. It also includes arrangements of other well-known T-Square songs.
- New Road, Old Way (2002)
- Vocal^{2} (2002)
- Spirits (2003)
- T Comes Back (2003)
- Groove Globe (2004)
- Passion Flower (2005)
- Blood Music (2006)
- 33 (2007)
- Wonderful Days (2008)
- Discoveries (2009)
- Time Travel (2010)
  - Marketed under its Japanese name.
- Treasure Songs – T-Square plays The Square (Original Title, たからのうた/Takara no Uta, 2010)*
  - This album became its own separate Series of Re-recordings of Vintage tracks from the era when T-Square was known as The Square (1978 to 1988).
- Nine Stories (2011)
  - This album contains 9 tracks, 2 tracks written by each Current Official Member of T-Square, with 3 tracks written by drummer Satoshi Bandoh.)
- Dream Songs – T-Square plays The Square (Original Title, 夢曲 (ゆめのうた)/Yume Kyoku (Yume no Uta), 2011)
  - This is the Second album in a series of albums in which T-Square would cover their songs which were originally released with the band known as The Square.
- Wings (2012)
- Rainbow Songs – T-Square plays T- and The Square Special (Original Title, 虹曲 (にじのうた)/ Niji Kyoku (Niji no Uta), 2012)
  - This is the Third and Final album in a series of albums in which T-Square would also cover their songs other than The Square era, and it employs the help of special guest musicians.
- Smile (2013)
- History (2013)
- NEXT (2014)
- Paradise (2015)
- Treasure Hunter (2016)
- REBIRTH (2017)
- CITY COASTER (2018)
- Horizon (2019)
- AI Factory (2020)
- Crème de la Crème (2020)
- FLY! FLY! FLY! (2021)

=== As a member of Ottottrio ===
- Super Guitar Session Hot Live! (1989)
- Super Guitar Session Red Live! (1989)
- Triptytch (1998)
- T Comes Back (2003) (Note: Although Ottottrio has nothing to do with a Recording, Issei Noro played on it.)
- T-Square 25th Anniversary (2003 DVD) (Note: Although Ottottrio has nothing to do with a Recording, Hirokuni Korekata played on it.)
- Casiopea vs. The Square – The Live (2004 DVD)
- T-Square 35th Anniversary Festival (2013)

=== As a Solo Artist ===
- Melody Book (1986)
- Melody-go-Round (1990)
- Andy's (1996)
  - This album is the basis of Gran Turismo Original Game Soundtrack.
  - Includes the original version of Moon over the Castle.
- Winter Songs (2011)
  - This collection of songs was possibly recorded within October 2010 to February 2011 and released in early March 2011. Also includes a cover of David Foster's Winter Games (Can't you feel it?).

=== As a member of AKASAKATRIO ===
- First Edition Live (2023)

=== As a video game composer ===
- Arc the Lad (1995)
- Arc the Lad II (1996)
- Gran Turismo (1997)
- Arc the Lad III (1999)
- Gran Turismo 2 (1999)
- Arc the Lad Collection (2002)
- Arc the Lad: Twilight of the Spirits (2003)
- Arc the Lad: End of Darkness (2004)
- Gran Turismo 4 (2004)
- Gran Turismo 5 Prologue (2007)
- Gran Turismo (2009 video game) (2009)
- Gran Turismo 5 (2010)
- Gran Turismo 6 (2013)
- Gran Turismo 7 (2022)
