= Teasing Master Takagi-san season 3 =

2022 Japanese anime series

Teasing Master Takagi-san
- Season 3
- Key visual of the season.
- No. of episodes: 12

Release
- Original network: MBS TV
- Original release: January 8 – March 26, 2022

Season chronology
- ← Previous season 2

Teasing Master Takagi-san is an anime series adapted from the manga of the same title by Sōichirō Yamamoto. The third season was officially announced in September 2021 after it was first teased with the release of the sixteenth volume of the manga, alongside an animated film. The third season aired on the Super Animeism block on MBS and TBS, and other networks from January 8 to March 26, 2022. (Note: MBS listed the season premiere at 25:25 on January 7, 2022, which is effectively January 8 at 1:25 a.m. JST.)

The opening theme is "Straight Ahead" (まっすぐ, Massugu) performed by Yuiko Ōhara. Like the first two seasons, the ending themes consist of covers by Rie Takahashi: "Yume de Aetara" (夢で逢えたら) by Eiichi Ohtaki (ep. 1), "Over Drive" by Judy and Mary (ep. 2–3), "Himawari no Yakusoku" (ひまわりの約束) by Motohiro Hata (ep. 4–5), "Gakuen Tengoku" (学園天国) by Finger 5 (ep. 6), "Joyful" (じょいふる) by Ikimonogakari (ep. 7–8), "Santa Claus Is Comin' to Town" (サンタが町にやってくる) (ep. 9), "Snow Magic Fantasy" (スノーマジックファンタジー) by Sekai no Owari (ep. 10–11), and "Hana" (花) by Orange Range (ep. 12).

Muse Communication secured the distribution rights for the third season in Southeast Asia. On December 28, 2021, Sentai Filmworks announced it had acquired the rights to the third season and the film for worldwide distribution excluding Asia, and is streaming it on Hidive.

== Episodes ==
Story	Episode	Title (Note: All English titles are taken from Hidive.)	Directed by	Written by	Storyboarded by	Original release date
26	1	"The Grip Strength Thingy"; Transcription: "Akuryoku no Yatsu" (Japanese: 握力のやつ)	Yasuaki Fujii	Hiroko Fukuda	Yasuaki Fujii	January 8, 2022 (Note: This episode aired at 1:55 a.m. JST, 30 minutes after the original air time.)
26	1	"Tan"; Transcription: "Hiyake" (Japanese: 日焼け)	Yasuaki Fujii	Hiroko Fukuda	Yasuaki Fujii	January 8, 2022
26	1	"New Semester"; Transcription: "Shin Gakki" (Japanese: 新学期)	Yasuaki Fujii	Hiroko Fukuda	Yasuaki Fujii	January 8, 2022
Nishikata uses some grippers while he is in the classroom. When he grabs Takagi's hand, Nishikata suddenly imagines different scenarios and flashbacks involving Takagi before he realizes he was only dreaming. After they show off their suntans to each other, Takagi challenges Nishikata to figure out why she called him or get a pat on his sunburned back if he guesses wrong. He eventually comes to the conclusion she wanted to spend time with him, but is too embarrassed to say it out loud. Elsewhere, Takao and Kimura are hanging out at the river, while Yukari tries and fails to make homemade facial masks with Mina and Sanae. Nishikata and Takagi are on their way to school when Nishikata shows Takagi another jack-in-the-box he made. When she opens it, they have a romantic encounter before she realizes she was only dreaming. Takagi later meets up with Nishikata where he attempts to show her the jack-in-the-box. When she goes to retrieve it, she whispers to herself about the dream she had.
27	2	"Presence"; Transcription: "Kehai" (Japanese: 気配)	Shin'ya Une	Aki Itami	Shin'ya Une	January 15, 2022
27	2	"Presence, Continued"; Transcription: "Zoku Kehai" (Japanese: 続・気配)	Shin'ya Une	Aki Itami	Shin'ya Une	January 15, 2022
27	2	"Desk Check"; Transcription: "Mochimono Kensa" (Japanese: 持ち物検査)	Shin'ya Une	Aki Itami	Shin'ya Une	January 15, 2022
27	2	"Library Duty"; Transcription: "Tosho Iin" (Japanese: 図書委員)	Shin'ya Une	Aki Itami	Shin'ya Une	January 15, 2022
27	2	"Sunset"; Transcription: "Yūhi" (Japanese: 夕日)	Shin'ya Une	Aki Itami	Shin'ya Une	January 15, 2022
Takagi and Nishikata try to follow each other without getting spotted. After a while, Nishikata comes across a marble, but is later shocked when Takagi correctly guesses this. While she is heading to school, Yukari sees Mina and she decides to follow her without getting spotted. After a while, Yukari is spotted by Mina. When Mina wonders where Sanae is, it is revealed Sanae is secretly nearby. In the classroom, Nishikata and Takagi agree to perform a mock desk check. However, when Nishikata becomes too embarrassed to check Takagi's items, Takagi reveals the class is not scheduled to have a desk check that day. While on library duty, Nishikata and Takagi agree to pick out books for each other. Takagi says "I love you" out loud while she is reading. When they leave, Takagi whispers to herself she will not recommend the book she read to Nishikata since the line is not in it. Takagi is running an errand when she sees Nishikata jogging. When she expresses skepticism about him going as far as the beach, a motivated Nishikata decides to head there. When he finally does, they ultimately watch the sunset together.
28	3	"Fan"; Transcription: "Uchiwa" (Japanese: うちわ)	Bak Gyeong-sun	Kan'ichi Katō	Bak Gyeong-sun	January 22, 2022 (Note: This episode aired at 1:40 a.m. JST, 15 minutes after the original air time.)
28	3	"Bewilder Ball"; Transcription: "Makyū" (Japanese: 魔球)	Bak Gyeong-sun	Kan'ichi Katō	Bak Gyeong-sun	January 22, 2022
28	3	"Cat Rescue"; Transcription: "Neko Kyūshutsu" (Japanese: ネコ救出)	Bak Gyeong-sun	Kan'ichi Katō	Hiroaki Sakurai	January 22, 2022
28	3	"Rain"; Transcription: "Ame" (Japanese: 雨)	Bak Gyeong-sun	Kan'ichi Katō	Bak Gyeong-sun	January 22, 2022
When Nishikata brings out a fan in the classroom, Takagi challenges him to a contest to see who can move an eraser the farthest, which she wins. She then stands next to him while he is fanning her. Nishikata has a conversation with Takao and Kimura about a baseball manga, which Takagi overhears while she in the hallway. Later that day, when Takagi catches Nishikata re-enacting a scene from the manga, she proposes a contest to see if he can strike her out. However, he ultimately loses when he becomes distracted. Yukari, Mina, and Sanae are walking together when they see a cat that is seemingly stuck. They then attempt to rescue it without success. When they take shelter from the rain, they discover the cat was not stuck after all. Just as school is about to end for the day, it starts raining, which causes Nishikata to run to the lost and found to a grab an umbrella. While he is walking home, he starts to feel guilty for leaving Takagi behind. He later returns to the classroom so they can walk home together.
29	4	"Uniform Change"; Transcription: "Koromogae" (Japanese: 衣替え)	Naoki Murata	Aki Itami	Hiroki Imamura	January 29, 2022
29	4	"Winter Uniform"; Transcription: "Fuyufuku" (Japanese: 冬服)	Naoki Murata	Aki Itami	Hiroki Imamura	January 29, 2022
29	4	"Lunch"; Transcription: "Obentō" (Japanese: お弁当)	Naoki Murata	Aki Itami	Hiroki Imamura	January 29, 2022
29	4	"UFO"	Naoki Murata	Aki Itami	Juria Matsumura	January 29, 2022
29	4	"Night"; Transcription: "Yoru" (Japanese: 夜)	Naoki Murata	Aki Itami	Juria Matsumura	January 29, 2022
In the classroom, Nishikata proposes a bet where Takagi will lose if she says "cold". He later tries to trick her into saying it, but she thwarts his plan. She then asks him a romantic question, much to his chagrin. Sanae is annoyed with Mina when she sees Mina and Yukari wearing their winter uniforms. Mina then attempts to reassure her that it is warm that day. After school, however, Sanae becomes annoyed again due to the cool weather. Nishikata is eating lunch alone when Takagi joins him. They then have a contest where the winner gets a particular piece of the loser's lunch, which Nishikata ultimately loses. Afterward, he begrudgingly thanks her for joining him. After seeing a picture of a fake UFO Takao took, an inspired Nishikata decides to do the same thing with a skeptical Takagi. When Nishikata later captures an image on his phone, Takagi realizes the UFO is real. Nishikata is at the public bathhouse when he runs into Takagi. When they leave, a flustered Takagi runs off when Nishikata offers to walk her home due to it being dark.
30	5	"Dislikes"; Transcription: "Nigate na Mono" (Japanese: 苦手なもの)	Hiroki Imamura	Kan'ichi Katō	Hiroki Imamura	February 5, 2022 (Note: This episode aired at 1:35 a.m. JST, 10 minutes after the original air time.)
30	5	"Gyoza"; Transcription: "Gyōza" (Japanese: ギョーザ)	Dali Chen	Kan'ichi Katō	Hiroki Imamura	February 5, 2022
30	5	"Audition"; Transcription: "Yaku Gime" (Japanese: 役決め)	Hiroki Imamura	Kan'ichi Katō	Yōko Kuno	February 5, 2022
30	5	"Fishing"; Transcription: "Tsuri" (Japanese: 釣り)	Dali Chen	Kan'ichi Katō	Hideki Okamoto	February 5, 2022
In school, a girl complains about green peppers in her lunchbox when her seatmate eats them. Her friend tells her that he is teasing her because he likes her. It is then revealed that the girl is actually Nishikata and Takagi's future daughter. In the present, Nishikata arrives in class feeling nauseous as he ate green peppers for breakfast. After he incorrectly guesses what Takagi dislikes, she tells him she would like to cook for him in the future. Yukari, Mina, and Sanae are eating lunch together when Sanae eats Mina's gyoza. Sanae later apologizes by buying Mina some melon bread. In the classroom, it is announced they will perform a play for the culture festival and Takagi is given the role of the princess. An audition is then held for the role of the prince. When it is Nishikata's turn, Kimura inadvertently wins the role instead. After school, Takagi and Nishikata visit a nearby pond where Nishikata challenges Takagi to a fishing contest. When a large fish snags Nishikata's line, Takagi holds him to prevent him from falling. When they head home, Takagi teases Nishikata about the exact feeling he is experiencing.
31	6	"Culture Fest"; Transcription: "Bunkasai" (Japanese: 文化祭)	Yasuaki Fujii; Bak Gyeong-sun	Hiroko Fukuda	Yasuaki Fujii	February 12, 2022
The class is preparing for the play when Takagi is unveiled in her princess costume, stunning Nishikata. He invites her to the rooftop, but becomes flustered when he realizes he did not tell her they were going to rehearse their lines. Takagi teases Nishikata about the situation before their rehearsal commences. On the day of the culture festival, they visit the haunted house where Nishikata challenges Takagi to go in and out as fast as possible. Elsewhere, Yukari and Kimura participate in an eating contest, while Hojo discovers Hamaguchi's class is running a maid café. During the play, Nishikata performs his role as a dumpling. However, near the end of it, Kimura begins feeling sick, and he has Nishikata take over as the prince. When Takagi trips during the final scene, Nishikata races out to catch her. Once he realizes his mask fell off, Nishikata improvises his lines to look like a love confession to Takagi, much to her delight, and receives a standing ovation from the audience. Later that night, they attend a karaoke bar with their class, where Takagi lauds Nishikata's performance, and hints heavily that she loves him.
32	7	"On a Walk"; Transcription: "Sanpo" (Japanese: 散歩)	Bak Gyeong-sun	Aki Itami	Bak Gyeong-sun	February 19, 2022
32	7	"Left at School"; Transcription: "Wasuremono" (Japanese: 忘れもの)	Bak Gyeong-sun	Aki Itami	Bak Gyeong-sun	February 19, 2022
32	7	"Santa Claus?"; Transcription: "Santa-san?" (Japanese: サンタさん？)	Bak Gyeong-sun	Aki Itami	Bak Gyeong-sun	February 19, 2022
32	7	"Knitting"; Transcription: "Amimono" (Japanese: 編み物)	Bak Gyeong-sun	Aki Itami	Bak Gyeong-sun	February 19, 2022
Nishikata meets up with Takagi to walk a dog. She then allows him to walk the dog by himself before they return it to its owner. As they head home, Takagi reveals she took a picture of Nishikata with the dog. Nishikata and Takagi are walking home together when Nishikata realizes he left his homework at school. When they return there, Nishikata ditches Takagi so his friends will not see them. Along the way, he runs into Mano and Nakai before he arrives in the classroom, where Takagi is waiting for him. Yukari, Mina, and Sanae are in the classroom talking about what they asked Santa Claus for Christmas. When Sanae reveals her family does not do Christmas presents at her house, Mina freaks out. Sanae attempts to tell Mina that Santa is not real, but Yukari stops her. During library duty, Nishikata is astounded when he learns Takagi knows how to knit. When Takagi claims she is knitting an item for a 15-year-old boy, Nishikata becomes agitated. She then reveals the item is for an elderly woman's dog.
33	8	"Side Trip Part 1"; Transcription: "Yorimichi Ichi" (Japanese: 寄り道①)	Naoki Murata	Aki Itami	Shōji Nishida	February 26, 2022
33	8	"Side Trip Part 2"; Transcription: "Yorimichi Ni" (Japanese: 寄り道②)	Naoki Murata	Aki Itami	Shōji Nishida	February 26, 2022
33	8	"Side Trip Part 3"; Transcription: "Yorimichi San" (Japanese: 寄り道③)	Naoki Murata	Aki Itami	Shōji Nishida	February 26, 2022
33	8	"Side Trip Part 4"; Transcription: "Yorimichi Yon" (Japanese: 寄り道④)	Naoki Murata	Aki Itami	Shōji Nishida	February 26, 2022
33	8	"Renting DVDs"; Transcription: "Rentaru Dī Bui Dī" (Japanese: レンタルDVD)	Naoki Murata	Aki Itami	Shōji Nishida	February 26, 2022
After school, Nishikata takes Takagi to some outdoor steps. When they finally reach the top, he is shocked when she mentions a legend that states boys and girls who climb the steps together will become a couple. While Hamaguchi and Hojo are climbing the steps, Hojo wonders if Hamaguchi is going to mention the legend. However, when he claims the view has really fresh air, she tries to bring it up herself, much to their embarrassment. Mano is excited to climb the steps with Nakai. However, she becomes concerned about how casual he is acting. When she wants to write their names in the notebook, he reveals he already did so during his last visit. Yukari thinks Mina and Sanae took her to the steps so they can have a meaningful conversation about romance. However, she is disappointed when she realizes they do not know about the legend. Nishikata and Takagi head to the bookstore where they exchange a couple of DVDs they rented. After they part ways, Nishikata realizes later on that Takagi knew he wanted to see the upcoming 100% Unrequited Love movie.
34	9	"Christmas"; Transcription: "Kurisumasu" (Japanese: クリスマス)	Hiroki Imamura	Aki Itami	Juria Matsumura; Hiroki Imamura	March 5, 2022
Nishikata has a dream where Takagi visits his room as Santa Claus. Later on, he meets up with her at the ferry so they can head to the mall to watch the 100% Unrequited Love movie. When they arrive there, they go to the arcade first, where Nishikata challenges Takagi to a contest involving the claw machine. They then arrive at the cinema, agreeing to pose as a couple to receive a promotional gift. After they finish watching the movie, Takagi asks Nishikata what type of girl he likes before she starts acting strange and clumsy. When they arrive at a plaza, Takagi reveals she was imitating Kyunko, the female lead of 100% Unrequited Love, as she wanted him to believe she was cute. As the lights of the Christmas tree come on, Nishikata hands her a present; a pair of mittens to keep her hands warm. Delighted by her present, Takagi gives him a present of his own, which turns out to be a scarf she knitted. When they return home, Nishikata and Takagi exchange Christmas cards.
35	10	"First Shrine Visit"; Transcription: "Hatsumōde" (Japanese: 初詣で)	Marie Watanabe	Kan'ichi Katō	Yūya Fukuda	March 12, 2022
35	10	"Snowman"; Transcription: "Yukidaruma" (Japanese: 雪だるま)	Marie Watanabe	Kan'ichi Katō	Yūya Fukuda	March 12, 2022
35	10	"New Years"; Transcription: "Oshōgatsu" (Japanese: お正月)	Marie Watanabe	Kan'ichi Katō	Yūya Fukuda	March 12, 2022
35	10	"Advice"; Transcription: "Sōdan" (Japanese: 相談)	Marie Watanabe	Kan'ichi Katō	Akitarō Daichi	March 12, 2022
On New Year's Day, Nishikata is at the shrine when he runs into Takagi. After they make their wish, they have a contest to see who will have the luckier fortune, which Takagi wins. When Nishikata tells Takagi they will do this again next year, she reveals her wish came true. When Nishikata meets up with Takagi, they have a contest to see who can make a better snowman in thirty minutes. Takagi makes a small snowman, while Nishikata attempts to make a large one. However, he ends up running out of time. Despite this, she helps him finish his. Takao catches up with Kimura at the school entrance, while Yukari, Mina, and Sanae discuss what they did during the holiday in the classroom. Once Nishikata tells Hojo what Hamaguchi would like for his birthday, she asks that he keep their conversation a secret. After school, when Nishikata refuses to divulge what he and Hojo talked about, Takagi claims she is going to give a present to a 15-year-old boy. When he wonders who, she reveals she was referring to his birthday next year. They then apologize to each other.
36	11	"February 14th" Transcription: "Nigatsu Jūyokka" (Japanese: 2月14日)	Dali Chen	Hiroko Fukuda	Shin'ya Une	March 19, 2022
On Valentine's Day, Nishikata arrives at school where he discovers three underclassmen have placed chocolate in his shoe locker. When he attempts to reveal this to Takagi in the classroom, he notices she is acting uncharacteristic. Elsewhere, Mina, Yukari and Sanae exchange chocolate, Mano gives her chocolate to Nakai, and Hojo gives Hamaguchi a chocolate bar, much to his disappointment. Later, Nishikata is concerned when Takagi continues to act uncharacteristically. In the hallway, he is approached by the three underclassmen and when he returns their chocolate, they reveal they actually meant to give to it a classmate of his named Shibasaki. After school, as Hojo and Hamaguchi walk home together, Hojo reveals the reason why she gave him a chocolate bar was due to her burning the homemade chocolate she made for him. Meanwhile, Nishikata locates Takagi at the shrine and she admits that she knew about the situation and she felt jealous. She then gives him her chocolate. The next day, Hamaguchi tells Nishikata they are going to confess their feelings to Hojo and Takagi, respectively, on White Day.
37	12	"March 14th" Transcription: "Sangatsu Jūyokka" (Japanese: 3月14日)	Yūki Bessho	Hiroko Fukuda	Hiroaki Yoshikawa	March 26, 2022
Nishikata is distracted thinking about what Hamaguchi said while he and Takagi are walking home together. The next day, as Nishikata prepares an elaborate White Day contest, Takagi tells him that she will be going to a relative's wedding ceremony on March 13. On White Day, after he sets the contest in motion, Nishikata receives a text message from Takagi saying she might not be back until the following day. Meanwhile in the classroom, Mina finds one of the boxes for the contest after Takao and Kimura inadvertently displace it. As such, she, Yukari and Sanae end up doing the contest instead. During library duty, Kimura gives Nishikata a book, which is the same one Takagi previously read. After school, Hamaguchi meets up with Hojo where he chickens out of confessing his feelings to her, much to her disappointment. Later that day, when Nishikata realizes all the times Takagi was being honest with him while reading the book, he runs out of his house to find her. When he finally does following a long chase, he tells her he wanted to see her, much to her delight.
