= 1974 in Japanese music =

Japanese music accounted for sixty percent of record sales in the Japanese music market in 1974 (Shōwa 49), the rest being sales of foreign music. During that year, Japan continued to have the second largest music market in the world.

== Awards, contests and festivals ==
The 17th Osaka International Festival (Japanese: 大阪国際フェスティバル) was held from 5 April to 24 April 1974. The 7th Yamaha Popular Song Contest was held on 5 May 1974. The 3rd Tokyo Music Festival was held on 30 June 1974. The final of the 1st FNS Music Festival was held on 18 July 1974. The 8th Yamaha Popular Song Contest was held on 13 October 1974. The final of the 5th World Popular Song Festival was held on 17 November 1974. The final of the 2nd FNS Music Festival was held on 19 December 1975. The 16th Japan Record Awards were held on 31 December 1974. The 25th NHK Kōhaku Uta Gassen was held on 31 December 1974.

The 23rd Otaka prize was won by Akira Miyoshi.

== Number one singles ==
Oricon

The following reached number 1 on the weekly Oricon Singles Chart:

| Issue date | Song | Artist(s) |
|---|---|---|
| 7 January | "Koi no Dial 6700" | Finger 5 |
| 14 January | "Koi no Dial 6700" | Finger 5 |
| 21 January | "Koi no Dial 6700" | Finger 5 |
| 28 January | "Anata" | Akiko Kosaka |
| 4 February | "Anata" | Akiko Kosaka |
| 11 February | "Anata" | Akiko Kosaka |
| 18 February | "Anata" | Akiko Kosaka |
| 25 February | "Anata" | Akiko Kosaka |
| 4 March | "Anata" | Akiko Kosaka |
| 11 March | "Anata" | Akiko Kosaka |
| 18 March | "Namida no Misao" | Tonosama Kings |
| 25 March | "Namida no Misao" | Tonosama Kings |
| 1 April | "Namida no Misao" | Tonosama Kings |
| 8 April | "Namida no Misao" | Tonosama Kings |
| 15 April | "Namida no Misao" | Tonosama Kings |
| 22 April | "Namida no Misao" | Tonosama Kings |
| 29 April | "Namida no Misao" | Tonosama Kings |
| 6 May | "Namida no Misao" | Tonosama Kings |
| 13 May | "Namida no Misao" | Tonosama Kings |
| 20 May | "Uso" | Kiyoshi Nakajo |
| 27 May | "Uso" | Kiyoshi Nakajo |
| 3 June | "Uso" | Kiyoshi Nakajo |
| 10 June | "Uso" | Kiyoshi Nakajo |
| 17 June | "Uso" | Kiyoshi Nakajo |
| 24 June | "Uso" | Kiyoshi Nakajo |
| 1 July | "Uso" | Kiyoshi Nakajo |
| 8 July | "Uso" | Kiyoshi Nakajo |
| 15 July | "Meoto Kagami" | Tonosama Kings |
| 22 July | "Meoto Kagami" | Tonosama Kings |
| 29 July | "Meoto Kagami" | Tonosama Kings |
| 5 August | "Meoto Kagami" | Tonosama Kings |
| 12 August | "Tsuioku" | Kenji Sawada |
| 19 August | "Fureai" | Masatoshi Nakamura |
| 26 August | "Fureai" | Masatoshi Nakamura |
| 2 September | "Fureai" | Masatoshi Nakamura |
| 9 September | "Fureai" | Masatoshi Nakamura |
| 16 September | "Fureai" | Masatoshi Nakamura |
| 23 September | "Fureai" | Masatoshi Nakamura |
| 30 September | "Fureai" | Masatoshi Nakamura |
| 7 October | "Fureai" | Masatoshi Nakamura |
| 14 October | "Fureai" | Masatoshi Nakamura |
| 21 October | "Fureai" | Masatoshi Nakamura |
| 28 October | "Yoroshiku Aishū" | Hiromi Go |
| 4 November | "Yoroshiku Aishū" | Hiromi Go |
| 11 November | "Yoroshiku Aishū" | Hiromi Go |
| 18 November | "Fuyu no Eki" | Rumiko Koyanagi |
| 25 November | "Amai Seikatsu" | Goro Noguchi |
| 2 December | "Amai Seikatsu" | Goro Noguchi |
| 9 December | "Fuyu no Eki" | Rumiko Koyanagi |
| 16 December | "Anata ni Ageru" | Mineko Nishikawa |
| 23 December | "Fuyu no Iro" | Momoe Yamaguchi |
| 30 December | "Fuyu no Iro" | Momoe Yamaguchi |

== Number one albums and LPs ==
Cash Box

The following reached number 1 on the Cash Box LPs chart:

- 5 January, 12 January, 19 January, 26 January, 2 February, 9 February, 16 February, 23 February, 2 March, 9 March, 16 March, 23 March, 30 March, 6 April, 27 April, 4 May, 11 May, 28 September, 5 October, 12 October and 19 October: Kōri no Sekai - Yōsui Inoue
- 20 April: Kaguyahime Vol 4 Sangayidate No Shi - Kaguyahime
- 25 May, 1 June, 8 June, 15 June, 22 June, 29 June, 6 July, 13 July, 20 July, 27 July, 3 August, 10 August, 17 August, 24 August, 31 August, 7 September, 14 September and 21 September: Golden Prize Vol 2 (Japanese: ゴールデン・プライズ第2集) - The Carpenters
- 26 October, 2 November, 9 November, 16 November, 23 November, 7 December, 14 December, 21 December: Nishoku no Koma - Yōsui Inoue

Oricon

The following reached number 1 on the Oricon LP chart:

- 21 January, 28 January, 4 February, 11 February, 18 February, 25 February, 4 March, 11 March, 25 March, 8 April, 15 April, 22 April, 2 September, 9 September, 16 September and 23 September: Kōri no Sekai - Yōsui Inoue
- 18 March and 1 April: Kaguyahime Vol 4 Sangayidate No Shi - Kaguyahime
- 29 April, 6 May, 13 May, 20 May, 27 May, 3 June, 10 June, 17 June, 24 June, 1 July, 8 July, 15 July, 22 July, 29 July, 5 August, 12 August, 19 August and 26 August: Golden Prize Vol 2 (Japanese: ゴールデン・プライズ第2集) - The Carpenters
- 30 September and 7 October: Kaguyahime Live - Kaguyahime
- 14 October, 21 October, 28 October, 4 November, 11 November, 18 November, 25 November, 2 December, 9 December and 16 December: Nishoku no Koma - Yōsui Inoue
- 23 December: Imawa Mada Jinsei Wo Katarazu - Takuro Yoshida

== Annual charts ==
Tonosama Kings' Namida no Misao was number 1 in the Oricon annual singles chart.

== Film and television ==
The music of Castle of Sand, by Yasushi Akutagawa and Mitsuaki Kanno, won the 29th Mainichi Film Award for Best Music. The music of Great Mazinger is by Chumei Watanabe and includes songs by Mitsuko Horie. The music of Space Battleship Yamato includes songs by Isao Sasaki.

== Classical music ==
The Japanese conductor Seiji Ozawa conducted the New Japan Philharmonic in a Concert for Peace at the United Nations General Assembly in New York City.

== Debuts ==
- Chieko Matsumoto

== Other singles released ==
- Soyokaze no Kuchizuke, Abunai Doyōbi and Namida no Kisetsu by Candies
- Hajimete no Dekigoto by Junko Sakurada
- Gakuen Tengoku by Finger 5
- 25 February: Bara No Kusari by Hideki Saijo
- 21 March: Koi Wa Jamamono by Kenji Sawada
- 20 April: Himawari Musume by Sakiko Ito
- 10 June: Pocket Ippai No Himitsu by Agnes Chan

== Other albums released ==
- Abunai Doyōbi: Candies no Sekai and Namida no Kisetsu by Candies
- Snowflakes Are Dancing by Isao Tomita
- Kuko / Yukigesho by Teresa Teng
- 25 June: Ishoku-Sokuhatsu by Yonin Bayashi
- 5 October: Misslim by Yumi Arai

== See also ==
- Timeline of Japanese music
- 1974 in Japan
- 1974 in music
- w:ja:1974年の音楽
