= Gakuen Tengoku =

1974 song by Finger 5

Single by Finger 5

from the album Second Album
- B-side: "Finger 5 Theme"
- Released: March 5, 1974
- Genre: Kayōkyoku; Funk; Pop
- Length: 5:04 (Side A & B)
- Label: Philips

Finger 5 singles chronology
"Koi no Dial 6700" (1973)	"Gakuen Tengoku" (1974)	"Koi no American Football" (1974)

Gakuen Tengoku (学園天国, School Heaven) is the fifth single by Japanese pop group Finger 5, released in March 1974. The single sold over 1.05 million copies.

== Overview ==
"Gakuen Tengoku" is the lead single from their studio album Second Album. It peaked at number two on the Oricon Weekly Singles Chart. The theme of the song is school life. The song is about students wanting to sit next to the prettiest girl in class during seating arrangement. In the beginning of the song, the shout "Are You Ready?!" was spoken by Akira Tamamoto, the fourth son of the Tamamoto siblings. The second shout "Hey Hey Hey..." was based on the Gary U.S. Bonds song New Orleans.

In baseball, Konan High School & Akashi Commercial High School used the melody of the song as one of their cheering songs.

== In popular culture ==
The first cover of this song was in 1988, Kyoko Koizumi covered the song in her studio album "Natsumero" and was made into a single in 1989. The single would reach at number three on the Oricon Weekly Singles Chart. It was used as the ending theme for the 1989 Japanese drama series Aishiatteru Kai!. In 2006, a cover by Wonder☆5 was used as the ending theme for the anime Twin Princess of Wonder Planet Gyu!. A musical ensemble of the song was featured in the anime Sound! Euphonium. In 2022, a cover by Rie Takahashi was used as the ending theme for episode six of Teasing Master Takagi-san season three. Around 27 seconds in the credits, the caption "ヤングの祭典" (Young Festival) can be seen on the blackboard which is a direct reference to the caption for the 3rd Tokyo Music Festival (Silver Canary Award category) held on May 16, 1974, at Hibiya Public Hall in which the group also performed and competed live. In 2024, a cover by Sumire Uesaka was used as the ending theme for episode one of Alya Sometimes Hides Her Feelings in Russian anime series.

== Track listing ==
Side 1
No.	Title	Lyrics	Music	Arrangement	Length
1.	"Gakuen Tengoku [学園天国]"	Yū Aku	Tadao Inoue	Tadao Inoue	2:34

Side 2
No.	Title	Lyrics	Music	Arrangement	Length
1.	"Finger 5 Theme [フィンガー5のテーマ]"	Mitsuo Tamamoto	Kazuo Tamamoto	Shin Saegusa	2:30

== Chart positions ==
=== Weekly charts ===
Year	Country	Chart	Position	Sales
1974	Japan	Oricon Weekly Singles Chart	2	540,000

=== Year-end charts ===
Year	Country	Chart	Position	Sales
1974	Japan	Oricon Yearly Singles Chart (top 50)	10	540,000

== Release history ==
Date	Single	B-side	Country	Label	Format	Catalog number
March 5, 1974	Gakuen Tengoku	Finger 5 Theme	Japan	Philips	7" Single	FS-1785
2003	Gakuen Tengoku	N/A	Japan	Glico (Time Slip Glico)	CD	AR-G008

== See also ==
- 1974 in Japanese music
