= Aki Yashiro =

Aki Yashiro 八代亜紀
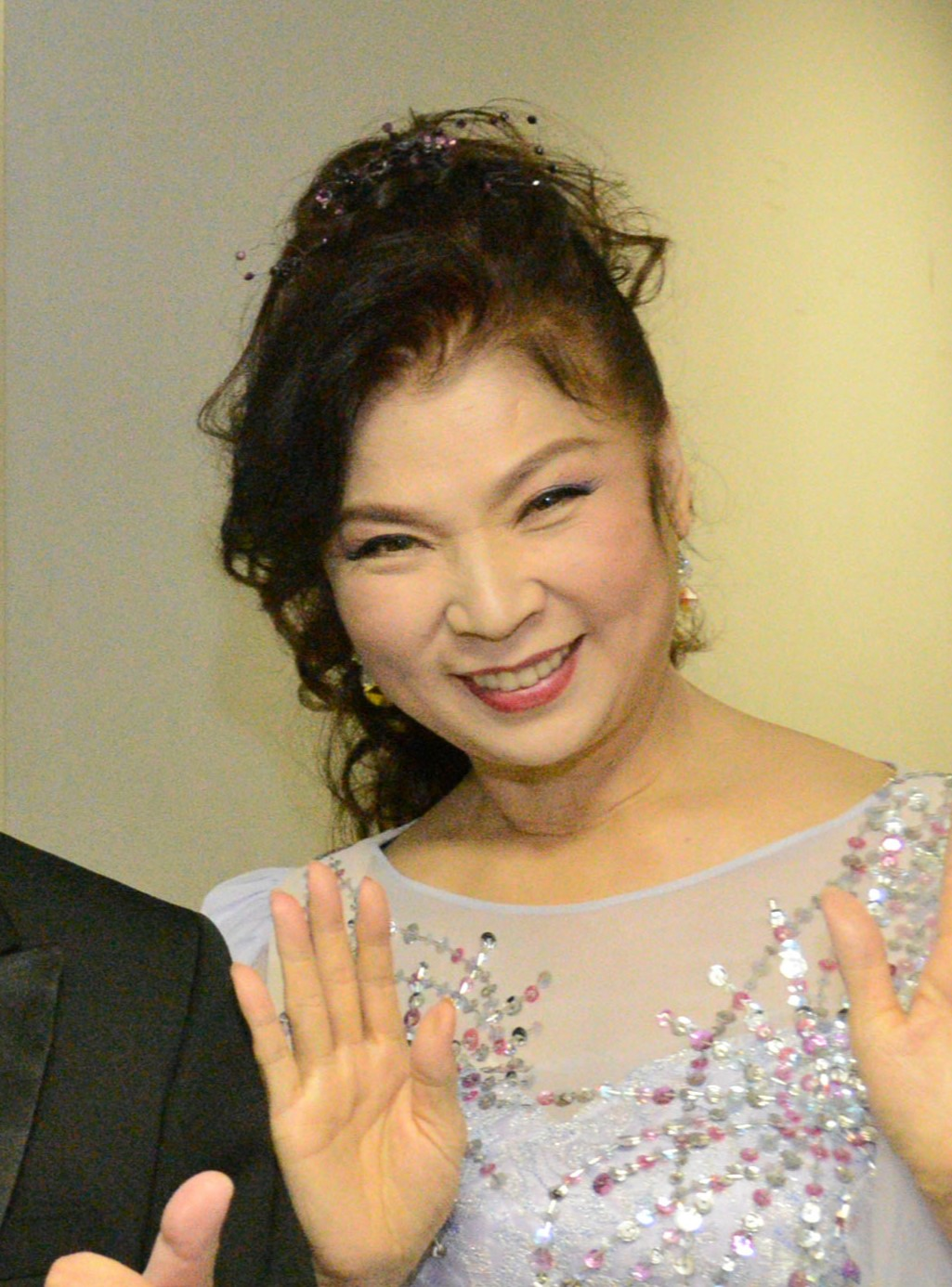
- Yashiro in 2016

Background information
- Born: Akiyo Hashimoto 橋本明代; August 29, 1950; Yatsushiro, Kumamoto, Japan
- Died: December 30, 2023 (aged 73) Tokyo, Japan
- Genres: Enka, Kayōkyoku
- Occupation: Singer
- Years active: 1971–2023
- Spouse: Noboru Masuda (m. 1994–2021)
- Website: yashiro.mirion.co.jp

Aki Yashiro (八代亜紀, Yashiro Aki; August 29, 1950 – December 30, 2023), real name Akiyo Masuda (増田明代, Masuda Akiyo), née Hashimoto (橋本明代, Hashimoto Akiyo), was a Japanese enka singer and painter. Her stage name "Yashiro" was adopted from her hometown Yatsushiro.

== Life and career ==
Yashiro originally sang jazz standards in hostess clubs, but made her debut as an enka singer in 1971, with the single "Ai wa Shindemo (愛は死んでも)", under the label of Teichiku Records. Seeing the single's lack of success, she appeared on the YTV's Zen Nihon Kayō Senshuken (全日本歌謡選手権) audition, winning it for 10 consecutive weeks. In 1973, her single and album "Namida Koi" (なみだ恋) sold up to 1.2 million copies. Since then, her songs like "Shinobigoi" (しのび恋), "Ai Hitosuji" (愛ひとすじ), "Onna no Yume" (おんなの夢), "Mō Ichidō Aitai" (もう一度逢いたい), "Onna Minatomachi" (おんな港町), and "Ai no Shūchakueki" (愛の終着駅), that dealt with women's emotions, also became great hits at the time. In 1979, her single "Funauta" (舟唄) also became a great hit, followed by "Ame no Bojō" (雨の慕情) in 1980. "Ame no Bojō" won the 22nd Japan Record Award of the year. She continued collaborating with Teichiku until 1981, before turning to Century Records, where she released singles like "Umineko" (海猫), "Nihonkai" (日本海), and "Koisegawa" (恋瀬川), until 1986. She had been recording under the Nippon Columbia label since 1986 until her death.

Yashiro was the first female enka singer to have seven top 10 singles on the main Oricon chart, as well as being listed as the fourth enka singer behind male singers Kiyoshi Hikawa, Hiroshi Itsuki and Shinichi Mori. She also achieved top 10 on the Oricon album charts for three consecutive years (1974–1976).

Her occasional acting appearances included the role of main character Natsume's mother Yoko Hyakuta in the 2020 streaming series Followers.

Yashiro announced a hiatus in September 2023 to treat a collagen disease. On January 9, 2024, it was reported that she had died on December 30, 2023 after a bout with anti-MDA5 dermatomyositis and rapidly progressing interstitial lung disease in a hospital in Tokyo.

== Appearances at Kōhaku Uta Gassen ==
Yashiro performed 23 times in the Kōhaku Uta Gassen. She performed consecutively for 15 years (1973–1987), but was not invited to perform in 1988. She was qualified again in 1989. Thereafter, she performed for the next consecutive 5 years (until 1993) and lost the qualification again in 1994, and returned to participate again for 3 consecutive years since 1999. She last performed in the prestigious annual show in 2001. She was invited but declined to perform in 2005 with the popularity poll "Sukiuta" (スキウタ).

Yashiro had three singles which have been sung more than once, which are "Namida Koi" (twice, in 1973 & 2000), "Mō Ichidō Aitai" (twice, 1976 & 1993), and "Funauta" (3 times, 1979, 1991, and 1999).

== Discography ==
=== Collaborations ===
- Unagitani (鰻谷) – Eigo Kawashima
- Sayonara Anta (さよならあんた) – Eigo Kawashima
- Tsuki no Hanamatsuri (月の花まつり) – Eigo Kawashima
