= Abunai Doyōbi =

Single by Candies

from the album Abunai Doyōbi: Candies no Sekai
- Language: Japanese
- English title: Perilous Saturday
- B-side: "Seishun no Mannaka"
- Released: April 21, 1974
- Recorded: 1974
- Genre: kayōkyoku; teen pop
- Length: 3:10
- Label: CBS Sony
- Composer: Kōichi Morita
- Lyricist: Kazumi Yasui
- Producers: Sumio Matsuzaki; Masatoshi Sakai

Candies singles chronology
| "Soyokaze no Kuchizuke" (1974) | "Abunai Doyōbi" (1974) | "Namida no Kisetsu" (1974) |

Music video
- "Abunai Doyōbi" on YouTube

"Abunai Doyōbi" (危い土曜日; "Perilous Saturday") is the third single by Japanese music trio Candies. Written by Kazumi Yasui and Kōichi Morita, the single was released on April 21, 1974.

The song peaked at No. 46 on Oricon's singles chart and spent 9 weeks in that chart. It sold over 38,000 copies while in the Oricon chart. It had sold over 90,000 copies by 5 April 1978.

== Track listing ==
All lyrics are written by Kazumi Yasui; all music is written by Kōichi Morita; all music is arranged by Kōji Ryūzaki.

| No. | Title | Length |
|---|---|---|
| 1. | "Abunai Doyōbi" ((危い土曜日; "Perilous Saturday")) | 3:10 |
| 2. | "Seishun no Mannaka" ((青春の真中; "In the Midst of Youth")) | 2:44 |

== Charts ==
| Chart (1974) | Peak position |
|---|---|
| Japanese Oricon Singles Chart | 46 |

== Cover versions ==
- Michie Tomizawa, Yūko Mizutani, and Megumi Hayashibara covered the song as the ending theme of the 1990 anime OVA Ariel Sesshoku-hen: The Beginning.
- Utahime Gakudan covered the song in their 2006 album Saishokusenringiku.
- The Possible covered the song in their 2007 debut album 1 Be Possible!.

== See also ==
- 1974 in Japanese music
