= Teasing Master Takagi-san season 2 =

2019 Japanese anime series

Teasing Master Takagi-san
- Season 2
- Key visual of the season.
- No. of episodes: 12

Release
- Original network: Tokyo MX
- Original release: July 7 – September 22, 2019

Season chronology
- ← Previous season 1 Next → season 3

Teasing Master Takagi-san is an anime series adapted from the manga of the same title by Sōichirō Yamamoto. The second season was announced on January 10, 2019. The staff and cast reprised their respective roles. It aired from July 7 to September 22, 2019, on Tokyo MX and other channels, with episodes being exclusively streamed on Netflix Japan.

The opening theme for the second season is "Zero Centimeters" (ゼロセンチメートル, Zero Senchimētoru) performed by Yuiko Ōhara. Like the first season, the ending themes consist of covers by Rie Takahashi: "Kanade" (奏（かなで）) by Sukima Switch (ep. 1), "Konayuki" (粉雪) by Remioromen (ep. 2), "Kiseki" (キセキ) by Greeeen (ep. 3–4), "Arigatō" (ありがとう) by Ikimonogakari (ep. 5–6), "STARS" by Mika Nakashima (ep. 7), "Anata ni" (あなたに) by Mongol800 (ep. 8–9), "Iwanai Kedo ne." by Ōhara (ep. 10–11), and "Yasashii Kimochi" (やさしい気持ち) by Chara (ep. 12). Ōhara also performed the insert song for episode 12, which is "Kimi to Hikari" (君と光).

A worldwide release on Netflix took place on December 6, 2019. The worldwide release was removed from Netflix on December 6, 2024.

== Episodes ==
Story	Episode	Title (Note: All English titles are taken from Netflix.)	Directed by	Written by	Storyboarded by	Original release date	Worldwide release date
14	1	"Textbook"; Transcription: "Kyōkasho" (Japanese: 教科書)	Yumeko Iwaoka	Kan'ichi Katō	Hiroaki Akagi	July 7, 2019	December 6, 2019
14	1	"Hypnosis"; Transcription: "Saiminjutsu" (Japanese: 催眠術)	Yumeko Iwaoka	Kan'ichi Katō	Hiroaki Akagi	July 7, 2019	December 6, 2019
14	1	"Waking Up"; Transcription: "Neoki" (Japanese: 寝起き)	Yumeko Iwaoka	Kan'ichi Katō	Hiroaki Akagi	July 7, 2019	December 6, 2019
14	1	"Stone Skipping"; Transcription: "Mizukiri" (Japanese: 水切り)	Yumeko Iwaoka	Kan'ichi Katō	Hiroaki Akagi	July 7, 2019	December 6, 2019
Nishikata is in class when he realizes that he does not have his English textbook. After a while, he reluctantly moves his desk next to Takagi's. Later, they exchange letters that contain hidden messages to each other. When Takagi walks in the classroom and sees Nishikata with a hypno coin, she asks him to try it on her. After being surprised that it seemingly worked, he eventually tells her to pick her nose. Just as she is about to do it, Nishikata has second thoughts and tries to stop her. Once this happens, Takagi reveals that she only pretended to be hypnotized. A tired Mina is in the hallway talking to Yukari and Sanae where she tells them that she watched a hypnotism show. As a result, she got hypnotized. Afterward, they find out that Mina is still hypnotized. As they are walking home together, Nishikata proposes he and Takagi have a stone skipping contest. During his second attempt, Nishikata prevents Takagi from falling into the river after he inadvertently bumps into her. When they decide to go home, Takagi asks Nishikata if they held hands, which he denies.
15	2	"Ice"; Transcription: "Kōri" (Japanese: 氷)	Shigeru Fukase	Aki Itami	Shigeru Fukase	July 14, 2019	December 6, 2019
15	2	"Appearance"; Transcription: "Gaiken" (Japanese: 外見)	Shigeru Fukase	Aki Itami	Shigeru Fukase	July 14, 2019	December 6, 2019
15	2	"Bangs"; Transcription: "Maegami" (Japanese: 前髪)	Shigeru Fukase	Aki Itami	Shigeru Fukase	July 14, 2019	December 6, 2019
15	2	"Valentine's Day"; Transcription: "Barentain Dē" (Japanese: バレンタインデー)	Shigeru Fukase	Aki Itami	Shigeru Fukase	July 14, 2019	December 6, 2019
Walking to school together, Takagi proposes a contest to Nishikata where the one who carries the biggest piece of ice to school wins. When Nishikata drops his, he offers his hand to warm hers up. However, she asks for his hand warmer instead. When Takagi meets Nishikata on the way to school, the latter tells the former that there is something different about his appearance from the day before and challenges her to figure it out. After a while, Takagi correctly guesses that it is his hair. She tells him that she will change her appearance the next day and he has to figure out what said change will be. At school, Mina teases Yukari about her messed up bangs until Yukari snaps. Yukari ends up apologizing to a despondent Mina. Nishikata is disappointed he has not received any chocolate on Valentine's Day. Elsewhere, just as Mano is about to hand her chocolate to Nakai while they are finally alone, Mr. Tanabe shows up, though he decides to not confiscate them. After school, Nishikata sees some chocolate in his shoe locker and Takagi teases him about it while they are walking home together.
16	3	"April Fools' Day"; Transcription: "Eipuriru Fūru" (Japanese: エイプリルフール)	Juria Matsumura	Kan'ichi Katō	Juria Matsumura	July 21, 2019	December 6, 2019
16	3	"Blossom Watching"; Transcription: "Ohanami" (Japanese: お花見)	Juria Matsumura	Kan'ichi Katō	Juria Matsumura	July 21, 2019	December 6, 2019
16	3	"Forms of Address"; Transcription: "Yobikata" (Japanese: 呼び方)	Juria Matsumura	Kan'ichi Katō	Yumeko Iwaoka	July 21, 2019	December 6, 2019
16	3	"New School Year"; Transcription: "Shinkyū" (Japanese: 進級)	Juria Matsumura	Kan'ichi Katō	Yumeko Iwaoka	July 21, 2019	December 6, 2019
On April Fools' Day, Nishikata and Takagi head to the candy store. Inside, Takagi urges Nishikata to try a grass-based candy, which he actually enjoys. Later, she tells him the upcoming school year may result in seats being shuffled. This shocks him until she reveals it only applies to the third-year students. With the new school year arriving, Mina tries to diet in order to emulate the slim bodies of models and television stars. However, when Takagi and Nishikata arrive with candy, she quickly abandons her regimen. A week after starting their first year, Sanae began addressing Kimura without an honorific, an act he found intimidating. Nishikata tried to take advantage of this by dropping "-san" from Takagi's name, but panicked and re-added it. In response, Takagi, who had been calling him Nishikata-kun, decided to remove the suffix. Now a second-year, Nishikata once again attempts to drop Takagi's honorific, but instinctively says it anyway. He tries to copy the upperclassman role in 100% Unrequited Love, which prompts Takagi to address him as Nishikata-senpai. Embarrassed, a struggling Nishikata gives up.
17	4	"Arm Wrestling"; Transcription: "Udezumō" (Japanese: 腕ずもう)	Kazuhiro Ōmame	Hiroko Fukuda	Yoshie Yoshi	July 28, 2019	December 6, 2019
17	4	"Grown-Up"; Transcription: "Otonappoku" (Japanese: 大人っぽく)	Kazuhiro Ōmame	Hiroko Fukuda	Yoshie Yoshi	July 28, 2019	December 6, 2019
17	4	"Bitter Taste"; Transcription: "Nigami" (Japanese: にがみ)	Kazuhiro Ōmame	Hiroko Fukuda	Yoshie Yoshi	July 28, 2019	December 6, 2019
17	4	"Bicycle"; Transcription: "Jitensha" (Japanese: 自転車)	Kazuhiro Ōmame	Hiroko Fukuda	Yoshie Yoshi	July 28, 2019	December 6, 2019
As a result of his push-up routine, Nishikata easily defeats his friends in arm wrestling. Takagi challenges him to a match, during which she lowers his guard by feigning weakness and joking about them holding hands. Staring out her classroom window, Mina philosophizes about how short youth can be. When she starts comparing it to expiration dates on food, Yukari and Sanae point out her thinking does not make her as grown up as she believes, but retract their statements when she starts to cry. Due to his loss in arm wrestling, Nishikata buys juice for Takagi. Remembering a conversation he had with his friends about maturity, he buys coffee for himself, but struggles with its strong flavor. Takagi tells him drinking coffee does not change her perception of him. Nishikata encounters Takagi walking to school without her bike, to which she asks him to figure out why. As they are hanging out, Nishikata eventually reveals his answer, which proves to be incorrect. While Takagi reveals one of the answers out loud, she whispers to herself that she had already told him the other answer earlier that she wanted to hold hands.
18	5	"Questions"; Transcription: "Shitsumon" (Japanese: 質問)	Shin'ya Une	Aki Itami	Shin'ya Une	August 4, 2019	December 6, 2019
18	5	"Eyebrows"; Transcription: "Mayuge" (Japanese: まゆ毛)	Shin'ya Une	Aki Itami	Shin'ya Une	August 4, 2019	December 6, 2019
18	5	"After School"; Transcription: "Hōkago" (Japanese: 放課後)	Shin'ya Une	Aki Itami	Shin'ya Une	August 4, 2019	December 6, 2019
18	5	"Happy Birthday"; Transcription: "Happī Bāsudē" (Japanese: ハッピーバースデー)	Shin'ya Une	Aki Itami	Shin'ya Une	August 4, 2019	December 6, 2019
18	5	"Sneeze"; Transcription: "Kushami" (Japanese: くしゃみ)	Shin'ya Une	Aki Itami	Shin'ya Une	August 4, 2019	December 6, 2019
After watching Dandy of the Old West, Nishikata tries to copy the titular character's mannerisms while he and Takagi engage in asking a series of questions. However, Takagi's prompts cause him to panic, which enables her to tickle him. When Mina misinterprets Yukari and Sanae's conversation about eyebrows, she insults Yukari's bangs. Although Sanae clarifies what they were talking about, Yukari is too hurt by Mina's remark. Nishikata and Yukari are members of the field trip planning committee, which forces them to stay after school. Unaware of his thoughts, Yukari observes Nishikata's behavior and assumes he is lamenting not going home with Takagi. On his birthday, Nishikata visits a bakery to pick up his cake when he encounters Takagi. Not wanting her to know his intentions, he challenges her to guess his destination and vice versa, only to learn she is also going to the bakery. Inside, Takagi picks up her items first before giving them to Nishikata as a prize for winning the challenge. In addition to sweets, he receives a 100% Unrequited Love keychain. Various students begin to sneeze, prompting them to theorize as to why they are being discussed.
19	6	"Revenge"; Transcription: "Ribenji" (Japanese: リベンジ)	Shigeru Fukase	Aki Itami	Sekijū Sekino	August 11, 2019	December 6, 2019
19	6	"Dodgeball"; Transcription: "Dojjibōru" (Japanese: ドッジボール)	Shigeru Fukase	Aki Itami	Sekijū Sekino	August 11, 2019	December 6, 2019
19	6	"Buy and Eat"; Transcription: "Kaigui" (Japanese: 買い食い)	Shigeru Fukase	Aki Itami	Shigeru Fukase	August 11, 2019	December 6, 2019
19	6	"Date"; Transcription: "Dēto" (Japanese: デート)	Shigeru Fukase	Aki Itami	Hiroaki Yoshikawa	August 11, 2019	December 6, 2019
As they are getting ready to take the sports test, Nishikata proposes a contest to Takagi where the winner is the one who receives the higher score. After a few tests are completed, the final one is the grip strength. During his second attempt, Nishikata becomes distracted when he thinks about holding Takagi's hand. When he concedes defeat, Takagi reveals that her score was lower than his. After school, Nishikata challenges Takagi to a game of dodgeball, which the latter easily wins. During the next game, Takagi asks Nishikata a loaded question with romantic intentions. Although Nishikata does not catch it, Takagi is glad he went after it. After buying some snacks at the candy store, a cat takes Yukari's candy bar. Giving chase, Sanae eventually discovers why the cat took it. As they are walking, Yukari, Mina and Sanae realize that they left their bags and snacks at the candy store. At the candy store, Nishikata and Takagi decide to buy some ramen. While they are eating, Takagi teases Nishikata about how it looks like they are on a date just before Takao and Kimura walk in.
20	7	"Camping Field Trip"; Transcription: "Rinkan Gakkō" (Japanese: 林間学校)	Yumeko Iwaoka	Kan'ichi Katō	Hiroaki Akagi	August 18, 2019	December 6, 2019
On the class camping trip, Nishikata, Takagi, Mano, and Nakai split up as Mano wants to be alone with Nakai. While Nishikata and Takagi are in a cabin, Nishikata challenges Takagi to guess a candy he feeds her. At dinnertime, the class is making curry when Yukari cuts her hand. As such, Sanae and Mina offer to help her. A folk dance is held later that night, during which the students discuss a rumor that two people with romantic feelings for each other will fall in love if they were to hold hands once the song ends. However, the music concludes just before Nishikata and Takagi are about to join hands. Although much of the class goes to sleep afterward, Mina, Sanae and Yukari attempt to use flashlights to communicate with each other via Morse code until Sanae and Mina are caught by Mr. Tanabe. Nishikata leaves his tent and spots Takagi stargazing; after she tells him she had made a wish on the stars, the two hide under a rock until Mr. Tanabe leaves. Once he is gone, Takagi reveals she had wished to watch the stars with Nishikata.
21	8	"Storage Closet"; Transcription: "Taiiku Sōko" (Japanese: 体育倉庫)	Naoki Murata	Hiroko Fukuda	Bak Gyeong-sun	August 25, 2019	December 6, 2019
21	8	"Nurse's Office"; Transcription: "Hokenshitsu" (Japanese: 保健室)	Naoki Murata	Hiroko Fukuda	Yumeko Iwaoka	August 25, 2019	December 6, 2019
21	8	"Lottery"; Transcription: "Takarakuji" (Japanese: 宝くじ)	Naoki Murata	Hiroko Fukuda	Bak Gyeong-sun	August 25, 2019	December 6, 2019
Nishikata is on cleaning duty for the day following PE class. Takagi joins him and they head to the storage closet. Inside, Takagi teases a flustered Nishikata about the situation. Meanwhile, Mina, Yukari and Sanae are in the hallway talking about the supernatural. Leaving the storage closet, Takagi notices that Nishikata has blood on his pants. When they head to the nurse's office, Takagi grabs the antiseptic and proposes a bet where Nishikata will lose if he says "ouch". Letting his guard down, he loses when he indirectly says it. In the hallway, Kimura shows his friends a winning lottery ticket. Elsewhere, Mina, Yukari and Sanae are walking home when Sanae finds a lottery ticket on the ground. After a while, they ultimately decide to take it to the station. Later, Nishikata and Takagi are heading home when they talk about what they would do if they won the lottery. After Nishikata goes first, Takagi reveals that she would go on vacation with the person she loves before she asks him if there is any place that he would like to go.
22	9	"Made You Look"; Transcription: "Atchi Muite Hoi" (Japanese: あっちむいてほい)	Bak Gyeong-sun	Hiroko Fukuda	Juria Matsumura	September 1, 2019	December 6, 2019
22	9	"Talents"; Transcription: "Tokugi" (Japanese: 特技)	Bak Gyeong-sun	Hiroko Fukuda	Juria Matsumura	September 1, 2019	December 6, 2019
22	9	"Worries"; Transcription: "Onayami" (Japanese: お悩み)	Bak Gyeong-sun	Hiroko Fukuda	Juria Matsumura	September 1, 2019	December 6, 2019
22	9	"Messages"; Transcription: "Mēru" (Japanese: メール)	Bak Gyeong-sun	Hiroko Fukuda	Juria Matsumura	September 1, 2019	December 6, 2019
In the classroom, Nishikata challenges Takagi to a game of acchi muite hoi. During one of the rounds, Takagi asks Nishikata if he has a crush on her. A flustered Nishikata realizes he lost when he sees Takagi pointing up. As the class is enjoying their time in the pool, a despondent Yukari does not join them as she cannot swim. After Mina and Sanae asks a bunch of questions, Mina tells Yukari that her talent is that she does not have one. In the classroom, Nishikata notices something is off with Takagi. After school, he finds her at the shrine, who reveals she had a fight with her mother. Feeling better, Takagi asks Nishikata to stay with her. She then asks if she can tease him again, much to his chagrin. At his house, Nishikata sends Takagi a text message. After a while, he becomes flustered when he nearly sent a couple of replies that could have been interpreted as being romantic. Nishikata then attempts to trick her, but he admits she got him with her reply. After they finish messaging each other, Takagi reveals she is blushing.
23	10	"Eye Drops"; Transcription: "Megusuri" (Japanese: 目薬)	Kakushi Ifuku	Hiroko Fukuda	Hiroaki Yoshikawa	September 8, 2019	December 6, 2019
23	10	"Scoop"; Transcription: "Sukūpu" (Japanese: スクープ)	Kakushi Ifuku	Hiroko Fukuda	Hiroaki Yoshikawa	September 8, 2019	December 6, 2019
23	10	"Hide-and-Seek"; Transcription: "Kakurenbo" (Japanese: かくれんぼ)	Kakushi Ifuku	Hiroko Fukuda	Hiroaki Yoshikawa	September 8, 2019	December 6, 2019
23	10	"Treasure Hunting"; Transcription: "Takara Sagashi" (Japanese: 宝探し)	Kakushi Ifuku	Hiroko Fukuda	Hiroaki Yoshikawa	September 8, 2019	December 6, 2019
After Takagi successfully applies Nishikata some eye drops, the two swap turns. In a panic, Nishikata attempts to force her eyes open with his hands as Yukari enters the classroom. Having misconstrued Takagi and Nishikata's eye drop challenge as kissing, Yukari asks Hojo to peek through the classroom door to investigate. Yukari later tells Mina and Sanae what she believes is a scoop, only to be frustrated when they provide childish examples. Nishikata challenges Takagi to a game of hide-and-seek, which the latter wins when she finds the former behind a set of barrels. Hamaguchi and Hojo then sit near their location. Nishikata accidentally exposes himself when Takagi comes closer to him. When he tries to explain they were playing hide-and-seek, Takagi describes their experience in a sensual light, embarrassing him and Hamaguchi. Walking home, Takagi finds a map that presumably leads to treasure. While following it, she and Nishikata reach a tree with the names of a couple carved into the trunk. The two then sit underneath it and listen to some music.
24	11	"Steps"; Transcription: "Hosū" (Japanese: 歩数)	Juria Matsumura	Kan'ichi Katō	Yumeko Iwaoka	September 15, 2019	December 6, 2019
24	11	"Fireworks"; Transcription: "Hanabi" (Japanese: 花火)	Juria Matsumura	Kan'ichi Katō	Hiroaki Sakurai	September 15, 2019	December 6, 2019
24	11	"Souvenirs"; Transcription: "Omiyage" (Japanese: お土産)	Juria Matsumura	Kan'ichi Katō	Shinichi Omata	September 15, 2019	December 6, 2019
24	11	"Promises"; Transcription: "Yakusoku" (Japanese: 約束)	Juria Matsumura	Kan'ichi Katō	Akitaro Daichi	September 15, 2019	December 6, 2019
Running into each other outside, Nishikata challenges Takagi to a guessing game in which they have to guess the number of steps they have to take. After she teases him about the situation, they agree to give up. Yukari sees that Mina and Sanae are sending text messages to each other. When she sees a message about the summer festival, Yukari remembers when she went with her sister a year prior and she obliges her sister's wish to shoot fireworks. At the library, Nishikata and Takagi exchange souvenirs. When Takagi later tells Nishikata how happy she is, the latter admits that he tried to prank her. At the shrine, Takagi heavily implies that she would like Nishikata to invite her to the summer festival. Riding his bike, Nishikata runs into Takagi and he offers to help her as he is on his way to meet his friends. As they are talking, Nishikata attempts to invite Takagi to the summer festival, but he is too nervous. When they arrive at her house, he rides away. Just as Takagi is about to head inside, Nishikata rides back and invites her to the festival, much to her elation.
25	12	"Summer Festival"; Transcription: "Natsumatsuri" (Japanese: 夏祭り)	Shin'ya Une	Aki Itami	Shin'ya Une	September 22, 2019	December 6, 2019
Nishikata and Takagi meet up to go to the summer festival where Takagi mentions she is looking forward to seeing the fireworks with him. Meanwhile, Yukari, Sanae and Mina prepare to go to the festival dressed in traditional yukatas. When they arrive, Yukari describes it as a perfect location for a couple to confess their love. Elsewhere, Nishikata sees various couples at the festival and feels uneasy about behaving the same way with Takagi. As the festival starts getting more crowded, Nishikata tries to hide from his friends, which causes him and Takagi to be separated from each other. Once the fireworks start, Kimura spots Takagi and realizes that she is looking for Nishikata. He then notifies Nishikata where she is located. As the fireworks end, Takagi spots Nishikata running to meet her and he grabs her hand. Later in the evening at the beach, they light up a pair of sparklers that Nishikata brought in hopes of winning at least once. Seeing it as a romantic gesture, Takagi tells him that he has not been losing at all. As Nishikata's sparkler extinguishes first, she declares it her win.
