= Soyokaze no Kuchizuke =

Single by Candies

from the album Abunai Doyōbi: Candies no Sekai
- Language: Japanese
- English title: Kiss of the Gentle Breeze
- B-side: Sakurasō no Kanashimi (LP); Hagureta Kobato (EP)
- Released: January 21, 1974
- Recorded: 1973
- Genre: kayōkyoku; teen pop
- Length: 3:09
- Label: CBS Sony
- Composer: Kōichi Morita
- Lyricist: Michio Yamagami
- Producers: Sumio Matsuzaki; Masatoshi Sakai

Candies singles chronology
| "Anata ni Muchū" (1973) | "Soyokaze no Kuchizuke" (1974) | "Abunai Doyōbi" (1974) |

"Soyokaze no Kuchizuke" (そよ風のくちづけ; "Kiss of the Gentle Breeze") is the second single by Japanese music trio Candies. Written by Michio Yamagami and Kōichi Morita, the single was released on January 21, 1974. It is the third track on their second album Abunai Doyōbi: Candies no Sekai, with a different mix.

The song peaked at No. 39 on Oricon's singles chart and spent 13 weeks in that chart. It sold over 63,000 copies.

== Track listing ==
All lyrics are written by Michio Yamagami; all music is written by Kōichi Morita, except where indicated; all music is arranged by Yūsuke Hoguchi, except where indicated.

7-inch LP
| No. | Title | Length |
|---|---|---|
| 1. | "Soyokaze no Kuchizuke" ((そよ風のくちづけ; "Kiss of the Gentle Breeze")) | 3:09 |
| 2. | "Sakurasō no Kanashimi" ((桜草のかなしみ; "Sad Primrose")) | 2:52 |

7-inch EP
| No. | Title | Music | Arrangement | Length |
|---|---|---|---|---|
| 1. | "Soyokaze no Kuchizuke" ((そよ風のくちづけ; "Kiss of the Gentle Breeze")) | | | 3:09 |
| 2. | "Hagureta Kobato" ((はぐれた小鳩; "Peeled Kobato")) |
| 3. | "Anata ni Muchū" ((あなたに夢中; "Crazy For You")) | | | 3:13 |
| 4. | "Candies" (Kyandīzu (キャンディーズ)) | Hiroshi Miyagawa | Miyagawa | 2:45 |

== Chart positions ==
| Chart (1974) | Peak position |
|---|---|
| Japanese Oricon Singles Chart | 39 |

== Cover versions ==
- The Possible covered the song as the B-side of their 2007 single "Shushoku = Gohan no Uta".

== See also ==
- 1974 in Japanese music
