= Teasing Master Takagi-san season 1 =

2018 Japanese anime series

Teasing Master Takagi-san
- Season 1
- Key visual of the season.
- No. of episodes: 13 (12 + OVA)

Release
- Original network: Tokyo MX
- Original release: January 8 – July 12, 2018

Season chronology
- Next → season 2

Teasing Master Takagi-san is an anime series adapted from the manga of the same title by Sōichirō Yamamoto. The first season was directed by Hiroaki Akagi and animated by Shin-Ei Animation, with scripts written by Michiko Yokote and character designs by Aya Takano. It aired from January 8 to March 26, 2018, on Tokyo MX and other channels. It ran for 12 episodes.

The opening theme is "Iwanai Kedo ne." (言わないけどね。) performed by Yuiko Ōhara. The series featured several ending themes covered by Rie Takahashi: "Kimagure Romantic" (気まぐれロマンティック) by Ikimonogakari (episodes 1–2), "AM11:00" by HY (ep. 3–4), "Bicycle" (自転車, Jitensha) by Judy and Mary (ep. 5–6), "Kaze Fukeba Koi" (風吹けば恋) by Chatmonchy (ep. 7–8), "Chiisana Koi no Uta" (小さな恋のうた) by Mongol800 (ep. 9–10), "Ai Uta" (愛唄) by Greeeen (ep. 11), and "Deatta Koro no Yō ni" (出逢った頃のように) by Every Little Thing (ep. 12). An OVA episode was bundled with the manga's ninth volume, which was released on July 12, 2018.

Crunchyroll simulcasted the series, while Funimation streamed the series with an English dub.

== Episodes ==
Story	Episode	Title (Note: All English titles are taken from Crunchyroll.)	Directed by	Written by	Storyboarded by	Original release date
1	1	"Eraser"; Transcription: "Keshigomu" (Japanese: 消しゴム)	Hiroyuki Ōshima	Michiko Yokote	Hiroaki Akagi	January 8, 2018
1	1	"Day Duty"; Transcription: "Nitchoku" (Japanese: 日直)	Hiroyuki Ōshima	Michiko Yokote	Hiroyuki Ōshima	January 8, 2018
1	1	"Funny Face"; Transcription: "Hengao" (Japanese: 変顔)	Hiroyuki Ōshima	Michiko Yokote	Hiroyuki Ōshima	January 8, 2018
1	1	"One Hundred Yen"; Transcription: "Hyaku-en" (Japanese: 百円)	Hiroyuki Ōshima	Michiko Yokote	Hiroyuki Ōshima	January 8, 2018
Nishikata attempts and fails to prank his seatmate Takagi using an improvised jack-in-a-box. Later, Takagi borrows his eraser, reminding him of a childish tale that used to be popular, stating how if one writes their crush's name on their eraser and finish using it, their love will be mutual. While she is away, Nishikata takes her eraser to write a name on it. However, he sees a message that says, "Look at the hallway" where Takagi is there giggling. Secretly though, Nishikata's name is written on the other side. Nishikata goes to school and sees Takagi on the window. When he cannot find her, Takagi pops out from the curtain besides him. Yet again, Nishikata fumbles in humiliation. As Nishikata tries to make a funny face to Takagi, she gives him tips for a much improved and even funnier face. However, as he turns his head, he faces Mr. Tanabe and gets scolded. Mina, Sanae, and Yukari are walking home when Mina suddenly stops and steps on what she believes is a one hundred yen coin. After some investigating, Yukari and Sanae tell Mina it is actually a token.
2	2	"Calligraphy"; Transcription: "Shūji" (Japanese: 習字)	Daiji Suzuki	Michiko Yokote	Daiji Suzuki	January 15, 2018
2	2	"Seasonal Change of Clothing"; Transcription: "Koromogae" (Japanese: 衣替え)	Daiji Suzuki	Michiko Yokote	Daiji Suzuki	January 15, 2018
2	2	"English Translation"; Transcription: "Eiyaku" (Japanese: 英訳)	Daiji Suzuki	Michiko Yokote	Daiji Suzuki	January 15, 2018
2	2	"Pool"; Transcription: "Pūru" (Japanese: プール)	Daiji Suzuki	Michiko Yokote	Daiji Suzuki	January 15, 2018
Nishikata and Takagi's class is having calligraphy lessons when Takagi proposes writing a word of what they want from each other. Nishikata's second attempt backfires when Takagi uncharacteristically shows kindness to him. As it turns out, she had rubbed ink on his face, as her second calligraphy depicts. Mina and Yukari mope about the heat when they notice Sanae wearing a short-sleeved uniform. Later, Mina and Yukari switch to shorter sleeves, but Sanae is in a longer uniform. During English class, Nishikata plans to distract Takagi long enough so she cannot answer the teacher when it is her turn to read aloud. To his disappointment, although she is caught by surprise, she easily finds the assigned line and answers it. Nishikata is unable to participate in the pool with the class due to a hand injury. As he sits on the bench, Takagi tests him to solve why she is not swimming. In a panic, he goes with his initial guess that she is undergoing menstruation. In reality, she did not have any problem and feigned a condition to join him.
3	3	"Coffee"; Transcription: "Kōhī" (Japanese: コーヒー)	Bak Gyeong-sun	Tōko Machida	Bak Gyeong-sun	January 22, 2018
3	3	"Empty Can"; Transcription: "Akikan" (Japanese: 空き缶)	Bak Gyeong-sun	Tōko Machida	Bak Gyeong-sun	January 22, 2018
3	3	"Soda"; Transcription: "Tansan" (Japanese: 炭酸)	Bak Gyeong-sun	Tōko Machida	Bak Gyeong-sun	January 22, 2018
3	3	"Muscle Training"; Transcription: "Kintore" (Japanese: 筋トレ)	Bak Gyeong-sun	Tōko Machida	Bak Gyeong-sun	January 22, 2018
3	3	"Dubbing"; Transcription: "Afureko" (Japanese: アフレコ)	Bak Gyeong-sun	Tōko Machida	Bak Gyeong-sun	January 22, 2018
3	3	"Umbrella"; Transcription: "Kasa" (Japanese: 傘)	Bak Gyeong-sun	Tōko Machida	Bak Gyeong-sun	January 22, 2018
Mina tries to drink a can of coffee, but struggles with its strong taste. Sanae offers her juice, which Mina graciously accepts before Sanae clarifies such a drink is childish. On the way to school, Takagi suggests a contest to see who can throw their respective cans in, with the loser forced to obey the victor. After she successfully makes her toss, she distracts Nishikata enough on his attempt to miss. Mina drinks a bottle of soda, though its fizz is too discomforting for her. Yukari drinks it without problem until she feels the urge to burp. She then lets one out while Mina talks loudly, which Sanae notices. Nishikata decides to form an exercise regimen based on Takagi's teasing. After she comments that he looks more muscular, a motivated Nishikata strives to continue his training. Mina, Sanae, and Yukari see two cats outside and pretend that they are having a conversation as a couple. Just as school is over with for the day, it starts raining. Takagi then suggests that she and Nishikata walk home together. As they do so under an umbrella, Takagi teases Nishikata about the situation, much to his chagrin.
4	4	"Cleaning Duty"; Transcription: "Sōji Tōban" (Japanese: 掃除当番)	Kyōhei Suzuki	Fumi Tsubota	Kyōhei Suzuki	January 29, 2018
4	4	"Kickover"; Transcription: "Sakaagari" (Japanese: 逆上がり)	Masato Satō	Fumi Tsubota	Daiji Suzuki	January 29, 2018
4	4	"Cold"; Transcription: "Kaze" (Japanese: 風邪)	Kyōhei Suzuki	Fumi Tsubota	Kyōhei Suzuki	January 29, 2018
4	4	"Tailing"; Transcription: "Bikō" (Japanese: 尾行)	Masato Satō	Fumi Tsubota	Daiji Suzuki	January 29, 2018
Nishikata is ordered to clean the science room. Before doing so, he discovers Takagi hiding in a closet, after which she convinces him to play four rounds of rock-paper-scissors, with the loser cleaning a quarter of the room. Nishikata ultimately loses all four. When Nishikata notices a jungle gym, he assumes Takagi will be reluctant to kickover the high bar. However, she orders him to look away during her first attempt. When Takagi goes again, Nishikata, who believes she is cheating, looks and realizes she is wearing shorts underneath her skirt, but concedes defeat as he broke the no-look rule. After spending the night watching the anime 100% Unrequited Love with the air conditioner on, a sick Nishikata arrives to class late. Concerned for his health, Takagi does not tease him throughout the day. After his attempts to instigate her fail, he tells her he is not actually ill and had simply overslept. While visiting the candy store, Mina, Sanae, and Yukari spot Takagi and Nishikata together. Inferring they are dating, the three begin to follow the pair. Noticing their presence, Takagi hides herself and Nishikata in a bush until they leave.
5	5	"Studying for the Test"; Transcription: "Tesuto Benkyō" (Japanese: テスト勉強)	Yasuaki Fujii	Michiko Yokote	Yoshie Yoshi	February 5, 2018
5	5	"Test"; Transcription: "Tesuto" (Japanese: テスト)	Yasuaki Fujii	Michiko Yokote	Yoshie Yoshi	February 5, 2018
5	5	"Test Results"; Transcription: "Tesuto Henkyaku" (Japanese: テスト返却)	Yasuaki Fujii	Michiko Yokote	Yoshie Yoshi	February 5, 2018
5	5	"Bookstore"; Transcription: "Hon'ya" (Japanese: 本屋)	Yasuaki Fujii	Michiko Yokote	Yoshie Yoshi	February 5, 2018
5	5	"Shelter from the Rain"; Transcription: "Amayadori" (Japanese: 雨宿り)	Yasuaki Fujii	Michiko Yokote	Yoshie Yoshi	February 5, 2018
Nishikata is busy studying for exams when Takagi joins him and decides to help. As they head home in the evening, Takagi reveals the study problems they were doing will not be on the test. Yukari stresses the need to get at least ninety percent on her exams to earn any video game she wants. As she begins to study the category, she discovers the next test subject is math, to her disbelief. After getting their test results back, Nishikata and Takagi try guessing each other's scores. When Nishikata overthinks his answer, Takagi reveals his initial guess was actually correct. At the bookstore, Nishikata buys the latest volume of 100% Unrequited Love. As he is leaving, he runs into Takagi. Not wanting her to know this, Nishikata lies until Takagi reveals she saw him buy it. Nishikata and Takagi takes shelter at the shrine during a rainstorm. A soaked Takagi begins to change out of her uniform and asks if she may wear Nishikata's PE shirt. After making a bet on if the rain will stop, Takagi allows him to wear her PE shirt.
6	6	"Tandem Riding"; Transcription: "Futarinori" (Japanese: 二人乗り)	Shin'ya Une	Tōko Machida	Shin'ya Une	February 12, 2018
6	6	"First Day of Summer Vacation"; Transcription: "Natsuyasumi Shonichi" (Japanese: 夏休み初日)	Shin'ya Une	Tōko Machida	Shin'ya Une	February 12, 2018
6	6	"Test of Courage"; Transcription: "Kimodameshi" (Japanese: 肝試し)	Shin'ya Une	Tōko Machida	Shin'ya Une	February 12, 2018
6	6	"Summer Science Project"; Transcription: "Jiyū Kenkyū" (Japanese: 自由研究)	Shin'ya Une	Tōko Machida	Shin'ya Une	February 12, 2018
6	6	"Water Tap"; Transcription: "Suidō" (Japanese: 水道)	Shin'ya Une	Tōko Machida	Shin'ya Une	February 12, 2018
After seeing their classmates Mano and Nakai riding a bike together, Takagi suggests doing the same with Nishikata, which he reluctantly agrees. When they begin practicing, Takagi agitates Nishikata. Upon failing, he gets her a can of juice but does not have enough money for himself, prompting Takagi to buy one for him. At Yukari's house, she is working on her summer homework while Mina and Sanae chide her for not enjoying the break. Unable to practice tandem, Takagi challenges Nishikata to a test of courage. Inside a tunnel, Takagi begins to play pranks on Nishikata. At home, Nishikata continues his workouts. While walking and eating popsicles, Mina and Sanae tell an annoyed Yukari that she will help them with their assignments due to her being the class president. Nishikata finds Takagi and follows her around before she hides in a bush, where she pops out and scares him. When a cicada surprises her enough to stumble, Nishikata scrapes his knee trying to catch her. The two go to a faucet to clean his wound, while Takagi gives him her handkerchief to wrap it.
7	7	"Shopping"; Transcription: "Kaimono" (Japanese: 買い物)	Hiroyuki Ōshima; Takeshi Ushigusa	Fumi Tsubota	Hiroyuki Ōshima; Takeshi Ushigusa	February 19, 2018
7	7	"Swimsuit"; Transcription: "Mizugi" (Japanese: 水着)	Hiroyuki Ōshima	Fumi Tsubota	Hiroyuki Ōshima	February 19, 2018
7	7	"Ocean"; Transcription: "Umi" (Japanese: 海)	Hiroyuki Ōshima	Fumi Tsubota	Hiroyuki Ōshima	February 19, 2018
7	7	"Room"; Transcription: "Heya" (Japanese: 部屋)	Hiroyuki Ōshima	Fumi Tsubota	Hiroyuki Ōshima	February 19, 2018
At the mall's bookstore, Nishikata purchases the latest volume of 100% Unrequited Love, but encounters Takagi outside, and she makes a bet saying she knows what he bought. To deceive her, Nishikata copies the characters' actions. Despite this, however, she still guesses correctly. Having lost the bet, Nishikata has to help Takagi select a swimsuit, a task that proves too embarrassing for him. When he sees Mano and Nakai in the store, he hides in the dressing room until they leave upon greeting Takagi. At the beach, Mina and Sanae prepare to swim when they notice Yukari pumping air into a life preserver as she cannot swim. Deciding to leave her, the two enjoy their day until they return to find an exhausted Yukari, who had to exhale into the inflatable as the pump broke. Discussing their summer homework, Takagi agrees to let Nishikata copy her answers and proposes working together at his house. Inside, she says she likes his room, prompting him to ask if they should study. As he only has one desk, they study together on his bed, during which she shows the assignments in question are kana writing drills, much to his dismay.
8	8	"Typhoon"; Transcription: "Taifū" (Japanese: 台風)	Hirofumi Ogura	Michiko Yokote	Bak Gyeong-sun	February 26, 2018
8	8	"Marathon"; Transcription: "Marason" (Japanese: マラソン)	Hirofumi Ogura	Michiko Yokote	Bak Gyeong-sun	February 26, 2018
8	8	"Ribs"; Transcription: "Wakibara" (Japanese: わき腹)	Hirofumi Ogura	Michiko Yokote	Bak Gyeong-sun	February 26, 2018
8	8	"Regret"; Transcription: "Miren" (Japanese: 未練)	Hirofumi Ogura	Michiko Yokote	Bak Gyeong-sun	February 26, 2018
Embracing the typhoon's severe winds, Nishikata role-plays as a wind-controlling character when Takagi overhears him. She copies his behavior, which he vehemently denies ever happened. Noticing she does not have her bike with her, Nishikata is quizzed on why, but cannot provide an answer in time. The school participates in a marathon, with Nishikata and Takagi creating a competition over who would be faster. They eventually agree to see if he can keep within a certain distance of her, a deal that ultimately leads to Nishikata's defeat as the girls are only required to run half the distance. On the walk home, Takagi pokes Nishikata's ribs, tickling him. Peeved, he considers responding in kind when she proclaims her ribs cannot be tickled. Nishikata plots various distraction strategies, all of which do not come to fruition, before Takagi allows him to poke her to prove her point. Mina, Sanae, and Yukari visit the tunnel, where Mina and Sanae begin to run around and examine every surrounding. The three eventually exit the tunnel, with Mina proclaiming her satisfaction.
9	9	"Cell Phone"; Transcription: "Kētai" (Japanese: ケータイ)	Naoki Murata	Michiko Yokote	Osamu Matsumoto	March 5, 2018
9	9	"Horror"; Transcription: "Horā" (Japanese: ホラー)	Naoki Murata	Michiko Yokote	Osamu Matsumoto	March 5, 2018
9	9	"Picture"; Transcription: "Shashin" (Japanese: 写真)	Naoki Murata	Michiko Yokote	Osamu Matsumoto	March 5, 2018
Nishikata gets a new cell phone and exchanges emails with his friends. Interested, Takagi asks to see it, which Nishikata prepares to exploit until she hands it back. Meanwhile, Mina and Yukari consider getting cell phones of their own and ask Sanae if she wants one, but she declines until she reveals she already has one. During cleanup duty, Nishikata and Takagi talk about their cell phone activities when the former decides to send the latter a scary video. Takagi eventually watches it, but is unfazed as horror does not have the same impact in the morning. At home, Nishikata considers his next move until Takagi calls him, and the two converse for the evening. Nishikata wants to take a photo of Takagi making a funny face as he is competing with his friends. She obliges, but does so when he is not ready. When he tries to convince her again, she scares him and captures his reaction. Worried about it being used as blackmail, he unsuccessfully asks her to delete it. Annoyed by Takagi's laughter, Nishikata tries to retaliate by taking her photo, though she quickly reacts and shifts to a normal expression.
10	10	"Who's Taller?"; Transcription: "Seikurabe" (Japanese: 背比べ)	Shin'ya Une	Fumi Tsubota	Daiji Suzuki	March 12, 2018
10	10	"I Hate the Cold"; Transcription: "Samugari" (Japanese: 寒がり)	Shin'ya Une	Fumi Tsubota	Yoshie Yoshi	March 12, 2018
10	10	"Invitation"; Transcription: "Osasoi" (Japanese: お誘い)	Shin'ya Une	Fumi Tsubota	Shin'ya Une	March 12, 2018
10	10	"Two-Choice Question"; Transcription: "Nitaku Kuizu" (Japanese: 二択クイズ)	Shin'ya Une	Fumi Tsubota	Daiji Suzuki	March 12, 2018
As they walk to school together, Takagi notices Nishikata has grown, leading to a height comparing contest. When Nishikata becomes skeptical of Takagi's measurement, she faces him directly before she admits she had been standing on her toes while their backs were turned. With winter arriving, Mina and Sanae decide to place their cold hands on Yukari's skin to elicit a reaction. When Yukari tries to do the same, she gets no response as her hands are too warm. Takagi does the same to Nishikata, which the trio notices as Yukari starts to assume they are indeed dating. Besides Yukari, Nishikata's friends infer he is dating Takagi when he declines their invitation to play video games. After asking Takagi directly, Mina discloses they are not going out, while Nishikata also denies it. As Takagi is usually the one who asks Nishikata to walk her home, she asks for his thoughts on the matter, but he is too nervous to give an answer. While buying juice, Nishikata asks Takagi a two-choice question. When it is her turn, Takagi eventually asks Nishikata loaded questions with romantic intentions, which he hesitantly answers.
11	11	"Cat"; Transcription: "Neko" (Japanese: ネコ)	Masato Satō	Tōko Machida	Hirofumi Ogura	March 19, 2018
11	11	"Taste"; Transcription: "Konomi" (Japanese: 好み)	Masato Satō	Tōko Machida	Hirofumi Ogura	March 19, 2018
11	11	"Portrait"; Transcription: "Nigaoe" (Japanese: 似顔絵)	Masato Satō	Tōko Machida	Hirofumi Ogura	March 19, 2018
11	11	"Fortune Telling"; Transcription: "Uranai" (Japanese: 占い)	Masato Satō	Tōko Machida	Hirofumi Ogura	March 19, 2018
11	11	"Critical Hit"; Transcription: "Kuritikaru" (Japanese: クリティカル)	Masato Satō	Tōko Machida	Hirofumi Ogura	March 19, 2018
Nishikata tries to pet a cat until Takagi's calls distract him. While she is petting another one, she tricks him into admitting his desire to do the same thing. However, the cat runs off. While seemingly having a conversation about boys, Yukari eventually realizes Mina and Sanae are actually talking about their favorite dog characteristics. In art class, Takagi and Nishikata are tasked with painting portraits of each other. Nishikata tries to draw a demonized image of Takagi, but he feels guilty about it. Takagi then shows him hers, which he incredulously questions. Takagi has her fortune told via tarot when Nishikata walks by for room cleanup. She then challenges him to rock-paper-scissors, which he unexpectedly wins. Takagi later tells him the fortunes regarding their crushes and the game. After getting a positive outlook for his horoscope and blood type, a confident Nishikata arrives in class. Later that day, when Takagi asks him why did he turn down an invitation from his friends, Nishikata says he wanted to walk home with her. Realizing what he said, he runs away, unaware that Takagi has finally blushed and conceded defeat.
12	12	"Letter"; Transcription: "Tegami" (Japanese: 手紙)	Shigeru Fukase	Michiko Yokote	Shigeru Fukase	March 26, 2018
12	12	"First Day of School"; Transcription: "Nyūgakushiki" (Japanese: 入学式)	Shigeru Fukase	Michiko Yokote	Yoshie Yoshi	March 26, 2018
12	12	"Seating Arrangement"; Transcription: "Sekigae" (Japanese: 席替え)	Shigeru Fukase	Michiko Yokote	Takeshi Ushigusa	March 26, 2018
The class has been secretly writing love letters to one another. After a while, Takagi affirms to Nishikata she wrote him a letter. When he reads it, it is just an invitation to walk home with her. In a flashback to their inaugural day of middle school, Takagi was worried after losing an unknown item when Nishikata arrived to class late. After getting their seat assignments, an annoyed Nishikata complained to his seatmate about how a "Takagi" was responsible for him being late. After the entrance ceremony, Takagi revealed she was the one he had helped, while the lost object was her handkerchief. After hurting his knee, Nishikata remembers he still has Takagi's handkerchief. The next day, the class changes seats. The new arrangement separates Takagi, Nishikata, Mano, and Nakai. After his effort to switch with his friend Kimura fails, Nishikata places his head on his desk in resignation. Upon waking up, he discovers Takagi had switched with Mano and Nakai with Kimura. Nishikata eventually returns the handkerchief; that night, Takagi unfurls it to find a thank you note from Nishikata, which causes her to happily squirm in her bed.
13 (OVA)	13 (OVA)	"Water Slide"; Transcription: "Wōtā Suraidā" (Japanese: ウォータースライダー)	Yumeko Iwaoka	Michiko Yokote	Hiroaki Akagi; Yumeko Iwaoka	July 12, 2018
Nishikata and Takagi join Nakai and Mano at the water park, where the boys quickly head for the water slide, to Mano's disappointment. She explains to Takagi that she is too nervous to be alone with Nakai and the two had agreed to ride the slide together, following a legend that couples who do so will fall in love. Wanting to support them, Takagi and Nishikata separately leave on their own to find each other. The two pairs eventually meet up at the slide, where Nakai and Mano ride together, while Takagi challenges Nishikata to catch her on the way down; although he accepts and nearly reaches her, she tells him the slide's legend, causing him to intentionally slow himself down before crash landing at the exit.
