= Abunai Doyōbi: Candies no Sekai =

Studio album by Candies
- Released: June 21, 1974
- Recorded: 1974
- Genres: kayōkyoku; teen pop
- Length: 38:11
- Languages: Japanese; English
- Label: CBS Sony
- Producers: Sumio Matsuzaki; Masatoshi Sakai

Candies chronology
Anata ni Muchū: Uchiki na Candies (1973)	Abunai Doyōbi: Candies no Sekai (1974)	Candies Best Hits (1974)

Singles from Abunai Doyōbi: Candies no Sekai
- 1. "Soyokaze no Kuchizuke" Released: January 21, 1974; 2. "Abunai Doyōbi" Released: April 21, 1974

Abunai Doyōbi: Candies no Sekai (危い土曜日〜キャンディーズの世界〜, Abunai Doyōbi: Kyandīzu no Sekai; lit. Perilous Saturday: The World of Candies) is the second studio album by Japanese idol trio Candies, released through CBS Sony on June 21, 1974. It contains the singles "Soyokaze no Kuchizuke" and "Abunai Doyōbi". Side A consists of original recordings while side B features English and Japanese-language covers of popular western songs.

== Track listing ==
All music is arranged by Kōji Ryūzaki, except where indicated.

Side A
No.	Title	Lyrics	Music	Arrangement	Length
1.	"Abunai Doyōbi" ((危い土曜日; "Perilous Saturday"))	Kazumi Yasui	Kōichi Morita		3:13
2.	"Sakurasō no Kanashimi" ((桜草のかなしみ; "Sad Primrose"))	Michio Yamagami	Morita	Yūsuke Hoguchi	2:52
3.	"Soyokaze no Kuchizuke" ((そよ風のくちづけ; "Kiss of the Gentle Breeze"))	Yamagami	Morita	Hoguchi	3:07
4.	"Seishun no Mannaka" ((青春の真中) "In the Midst of Youth")	Yasui	Morita		2:46
5.	"Kiiroi Bikini" ((黄色いビキニ; "Yellow Bikini"))	Yamagami	Morita	Hoguchi	3:21
6.	"Anata ni Muchū" ((あなたに夢中; "Crazy for You"))	Yamagami	Morita		3:13

Side B
No.	Title	Lyrics	Music	Arrangement	Length
1.	"Stupid Cupid" (Manuke na Kyūpitto (まぬけなキューピット))	Howard Greenfield; Candies	Neil Sedaka	Hoguchi	3:12
2.	"Ticket to Ride" (Namida no Jōshaken (涙の乗車券))	Lennon–McCartney	Lennon–McCartney		3:53
3.	"Yesterday Once More" (Iesutadei Wansu Moa (イエスタデイ・ワンス・モア))	Richard Carpenter; John Bettis	Carpenter; Bettis		3:46
4.	"California Dreamin'" (Yume no Kariforunia (夢のカリフォルニア))	John Phillips; Michelle Phillips	J. Phillips; M. Phillips		2:25
5.	"Bus Stop" (Basu Sutoppu (バス・ストップ))	Graham Gouldman; Kazuko Katagiri	Gouldman	Hoguchi	3:09
6.	"Little Devil" (Chīsana Akuma (小さな悪魔))	Greenfield; Kenji Sazanami	Sedaka		3:13

== See also ==
- 1974 in Japanese music
