= List of Twin Princess of Wonder Planet episodes =

no
- No. of episodes: 51

Release
- Original network: TV Tokyo
- Original release: April 2, 2005 – March 25, 2006

Series chronology
- Next → Twin Princess of Wonder Planet Gyu!

Twin Princess of Wonder Planet is a 2005 Japanese anime television series based on Birthday's concept. The anime series was produced by Nihon Ad Systems under the direction of Junichi Sato and consists of 51 episodes. The story follows the adventures of the twin princesses of Wonder Planet (a mysterious planet shaped like a hollow earth).

Three pieces of theme music are used for the first Season 1 opening themes and two closing themes. The opening theme is "Princess wa Akiramenai" (プリンセスはあきらめない) performed by Flip-Flap. The ending theme for episodes 1-28 is "Oshare Fantasy" (おしゃれファンタジー), while from episodes 29-51 is "Patatata Run" (パタタタ・ルン♪), both performed by Fine Rein.

== Episode list ==
No.	Title	Directed by	Written by	Original release date
1	"Sweetest Smiles: Twin Princesses"; Transliteration: "Tobikiri sumairu ☆ Futago no purinsesu" (Japanese: とびきりスマイル☆ふたごのプリンセス)	Shōgo Kōmoto	Rika Nakase	April 2, 2005
During the Best Princess, Princess Fine and Rein meet Princess Grace, the princess who died saving the seven countries from darkness. They also learn how to use the Prominence. Prince Bright of the Jewelry Kingdom is also introduced, along with The Flame Princess, Lione.
2	"Flame Kingdom: Prominence on Empty Stomach"; Transliteration: "Meramera no kuni ☆ Harapeko de purominensu" (Japanese: メラメラの国☆はらぺこでプロミネンス)	Kōta Okuno	Rika Nakase	April 9, 2005
Fine and Rein go to the Flame country, where Fine wants to eat the flame fried rice. They go to the restaurant, only to find it closed. It turns out that the owner of the restaurant cannot make the Flame fried rice anymore because the volcano, where the spice is gathered, has not erupted in a long time.
3	"Get Rid of the Dragon: Totally Impossible?"; Transliteration: "Doragon taiji ☆ Sonna no muri muri?" (Japanese: ドラゴン退治☆そんなのむりむり？)	Masayuki Matsumoto	Hiro Masaki	April 16, 2005
For the second time, Fine and Rein go to the Flame Country to visit Lione in the Flame Kingdom's castle. They have to awaken the dragon that heats the land before the Flame Kingdom ices over.
4	"Lovely Décor: Let's Do Our Best"; Transliteration: "Sutekina dekōru ☆ Ganbacchaō" (Japanese: すてきなデコール☆がんばっちゃおう)	Tatsufumi Itō	Yoshifumi Fukushima	April 23, 2005
Fine and Rein's mother gives them a décor maker. While looking for decorations, they found a cat who has shiny things so they follow her.
5	"First Place This Time: Princess Party"; Transliteration: "Kondo wa yūshō ☆ Purinsesu pāti" (Japanese: 今度は優勝☆プリンセスパーティ)	Kiyotaka Itani	Natsuko Takahashi	April 30, 2005
Today's Princess Party is Best Décor Princess.
6	"Ask the Fortune Teller: The Secret of Eclipse"; Transliteration: "Uranai de shiritai ☆ Ekuripusu no himitsu" (Japanese: 占いで知りたい☆エクリプスの秘密)	Katsumi Ono	Rika Nakase	May 7, 2005
The princesses go to the Moon Kingdom to learn more about Eclipse.
7	"We Can't Return to the Castle! Dig Here-rabirabi"; Transliteration: "Ojō ni Kaerenai! ☆ Kokohore Rabi-rabi" (Japanese: お城に帰れな～い！☆ここほれラビラビ)	Kōta Okuno	Michihiro Tsuchiya	May 14, 2005
As Fine and Rein hear about the star spring in the Moon Kingdom, they decide to go to it the next day without Poomo knowing. The twins are lent a sand boat as they get to the spring. When the princesses falls from tower into the ground, the rabbits were being pestered by scorpions, while Rein and Fine use prominence to stop the scorpions from attacking. Suddenly, water came out of the ground, giving them water.
8	"Make it Gorgeous: Battle of the Décor"; Transliteration: "Gōjasu ga kimete ☆ Dekōru no tatakai" (Japanese: ゴージャスが決め手☆デコールの戦い)	Daisuke Tsukushi	Natsuko Takahashi	May 21, 2005
The twins head to the Jewelry Kingdom to learn the ways of making beautiful décor like their mother. When they get there, the teacher they searched for has to make the gorgeous jewelry complete. The loser must leave Décor Plaza.
9	"Jewelry Kingdom: Come to the Town of Toys"; Transliteration: "Hōseki no kuni ☆ Omocha no machi ni oide yo" (Japanese: 宝石の国☆おもちゃの町においでよ)	Tatsufumi Itō	Yoshifumi Fukushima	May 28, 2005
The princesses visit the Jewelry Kingdom and find a doll called Puppet.
10	"Let's Make Sweets: Princess Party"; Transliteration: "Okashi o tsukurou ☆ Purinsesu pātī" (Japanese: お菓子を作ろう☆プリンセスパーティ)	Kōta Okuno	Hiro Masaki	June 4, 2005
The princesses are baking sweets for another princess party.
11	"Training is Really Hard: Become More Wonderful Princesses"; Transliteration: "Maji shugyō ☆ Motto suteki ni purinsesu" (Japanese: マジ修行☆もっとすてきにプリンセス)	Shigeru Ueda	Michihiro Tsuchiya	June 11, 2005
Disheartened by hurting Altezza's feelings, the twins work hard to become better princesses.
12	"Seeds Kingdom: Being Small is Hard"; Transliteration: "Tane-tane no kuni ☆ Chicchai tte taihen" (Japanese: タネタネの国☆ちっちゃいって大変)	Katsumi Ono	Yoshifumi Fukushima	June 18, 2005
The princesses go to the Seed Kingdom where Fine is turned into a monkey.
13	"Scary Forest: A Wee Bit Exciting Experience"; Transliteration: "Kowa~i mori ☆ Choppiri dokidoki no taiken" (Japanese: こわ～い森☆ちょっぴりドキドキの体験)	Tatsufumi Itō	Rika Nakase	June 25, 2005
Moments of jealousy and love are flying everywhere for the princesses.
14	"Poomo's Training: Argument Between the Twins"; Transliteration: "Pūmo no shugyō ☆ Kenka shichatta futa go" (Japanese: プーモの修行☆ケンカしちゃったふたご)	Daisuke Tsukushi	Hiro Masaki	July 2, 2005
Continuing from the previous episode, Poomo, thinking the reason the twins will not stop fighting is because of his lack of strength, decides to leave to find a master of kung fu. The girls find out and rush to the island fighting the whole way there, and even longer. With Poomo in trouble, the girls reunite and save the day.
15	"Moon Kingdom: The Mysterious Invitation"; Transliteration: "Tsuki no kuni ☆ Nazo no shōtaijō" (Japanese: 月の国☆謎の招待状)	Kōta Okuno	Natsuko Takahashi	July 9, 2005
Fine and Rein go to the moon festival and find out a Moon God will not wake up, so they save the day by using the prominence. The duo also meets Prince Shade for the first time.
16	"Milky in Big Trouble: The True Identity of Eclipse"; Transliteration: "Mirukī dai pinchi ☆ Ekuripusu no shōtai" (Japanese: ミルキー大ピンチ☆エクリプスの正体)	Yasushi Muroya	Rika Nakase	July 16, 2005
The princesses discover the true identity of Eclipse.
17	"Athletes, Be Passionate! Princess Party"; Transliteration: "Moero supōtsu! ☆ Purinsesu pāti" (Japanese: 燃えろスポーツ！☆プリンセスパーティ)	Katsumi Ono	Michihiro Tsuchiya	July 23, 2005
The Seed Kingdom hosts the next Princess Party for sports.
18	"Windmill Kingdom vs. Jewelry Kingdom: Balloon Battle"; Transliteration: "Kazaguruma no kuni VS Hōseki no kuni ☆ Kikyū de batoru" (Japanese: かざぐるまの国VS宝石の国☆気球でバトル)	Daisuke Tsukushi	Yoshifumi Fukushima	July 30, 2005
A balloon race takes place between the Jewelry Kingdom and the Windmill Kingdom.
19	"Waterdrop Kingdom: Mirlo Will Marry?"; Transliteration: "Shizuku no kuni ☆ Miruro kekkon ka?" (Japanese: しずくの国☆ミルロ結婚か？)	Tatsufumi Itō	Hiro Masaki	August 6, 2005
The Minister of the Moon Kingdom shows his true nature as the twins try to help Mirlo out of an engagement.
20	"Shooting Stars in the Sea: Another Country That No One Knows"; Transliteration: "Umi no nagareboshi ☆ Daremo shiranai mō hitotsu no kuni" (Japanese: 海の流れ星☆誰も知らないもうひとつの国)	Kōta Okuno	Natsuko Takahashi	August 13, 2005
Fine and Rein visit the Sea Kingdom.
21	"The Haunted House: Screamed Prominence"; Transliteration: "Obake yashiki ☆ Zekkyō purominensu" (Japanese: おばけやしき☆絶叫プロミネンス)	Yoshio Mukainakano	Michihiro Tsuchiya	August 20, 2005
The twins help a ghost scare Prince Bright and Auler, and Princess Altessa and Sophie.
22	"Haughty Altezza: We're in a Pinch! I Hate It!"; Transliteration: "Namaiki arutessa ☆ Pinchi de iyaiya~n" (Japanese: 生意気アルテッサ☆ピンチでいやいや～ん)	Yasushi Muroya	Rika Nakase	August 27, 2005
Rein, Fine, Prince Aluer, Princess Sophie travel to the Diamond Kingdom for the tea party Prince Bright invited them to. Altessa is not happy to have them there and leaves the party. After Bright tells them of her secret room, they discover that Altessa is harder working then they thought. A fire then breaks out in the castle and Altessa gets stuck in her secret room.
23	"Seeds of Destiny: The Princesses Are Good Friends?!"; Transliteration: "Unmei no tane ☆ Nakayoshi purinsesu!?" (Japanese: 運命の種☆なかよしプリンセス!?)	Daisuke Tsukushi	Yoshifumi Fukushima	September 3, 2005
24	"Windmill Kingdom: Don't Take Our Luchés!"; Transliteration: "Kazaguruma no kuni ☆ Rūche totcha dame dame~n" (Japanese: かざぐるまの国☆ルーチェとっちゃだめだめ～ん)	Yoshitaka Fujimoto	Hiro Masaki	September 10, 2005
While visiting Sophie, Fine Rein and the Bird People have a conflict.
25	"Surprised by Locusts: Princess Party"; Transliteration: "Inago de bikkuri ☆ Purinsesu pāti" (Japanese: いなごでびっくり☆プリンセスパーティ)	Kōta Okuno	Kiyoko Yoshimura	September 17, 2005
At the Flower Arranging Party, the Minister's workers appear and somehow manage to get Locusts released.
26	"Oh My God, We Can't Prominence!"; Transliteration: "Taihen taihen ☆ Purominensu dekina~i" (Japanese: 大変大変☆プロミネンスできな～い)	Tatsufumi Itō	Yoshifumi Fukushima	September 24, 2005
The Twin Princesses sneak into the Moon Kingdom's castle to figure out Eclipse' true identity, but they lose their ability to Prominence.
27	"Dark Poomo: Fortune Princesses"; Transliteration: "Kuroi pūmo ☆ Fōchun purinsesu" (Japanese: 黒いプーモ☆フォーチュンプリンセス)	Yasushi Muroya	Rika Nakase	October 1, 2005
As the twins are sad after being able to lose their ability to Prominence, they are reminded to smile by their parents and think positive again. In the same time, Altezza comes to them telling that Bright is sad as well. They visit the Jewelry Kingdom and everything is fine on a trip to town with Bright, but a machine acts up. Princess Grace awards the twins with the power to Prominence again.
28	"Fortune Princesses at Last (This Sounds Awesome)"; Transliteration: "Tsuini fōchun ☆ Kore tte sugoi kamo" (Japanese: ついにフォーチュン☆これってすごいかも)	Daisuke Tsukushi	Hiro Masaki	October 8, 2005
The girls have leveled up to Fortune Princesses and defeat the machine. They find out Boomo is with Bright. Bright is convinced by the Moon Minister that he has been chosen to become king and save the Mysterious Star. Meanwhile, Altezza is looking for Bright and does the "I Hate it" dance. When the three princesses eavesdrop, the twins manage to cheer her up by saying Bright may be at the castle, and he appears later to talk to his parents about the machine incident. Fine and Rein go looking in the forest and find Boomo in a cave and he runs away from the two. While looking for a book in Bright's room, Altezza finds Boomo and runs away with him from Bright. The twins find them and turn into Fortune Princesses and help Altezza escape from Bright. He leaves with Boomo and the girls resolve to save him from darkness.
29	"Cheer Up, Altezza!"; Transliteration: "Genki o dashite ☆ Arutessa" (Japanese: 元気を出して☆アルテッサ)	Takayuki Fukuda	Rika Nakase	October 15, 2005
The three princesses follow Bright and Boomo and try to turn him back to normal by being Fortune Princesses but the power of darkness shields Bright. Back in Sunny Kingdom, they tell the King and Queen about the situation. The three search for Princess Grace' book that may contain a spell to help Bright. As the three princesses find the book in a book store much to Shade's help, they see Bright in a hot air balloon, but he ignores them. The three then leave to find a way to save Bright.
30	"Waterdrop Kingdom: Fake Twin Princesses?!"; Transliteration: "Shizuku no kuni ☆ Nise futago hime!?" (Japanese: しずくの国☆ニセふたご姫!?)	Kōta Okuno	Michihiro Tsuchiya	October 22, 2005
Two young girls impersonate Fine and Rein after being tricked by Bright and Boomo.
31	"The Treasure Map: Dig, Dig, and Dig Some More"; Transliteration: "Takara no chizu ☆ Hotte hotte horimakure" (Japanese: 宝の地図☆掘って掘って掘りまくれ)	Makoto Sokuza	Natsuko Takahashi	October 29, 2005
In the Windmill Kingdom, a baker family gets tricked by a fake treasure map from Bright and Boomo.
32	"Do Your Best, Tio! The Flame Country's Samba Festival"; Transliteration: "Ganbare Tio ☆ Meramera Sanba matsuri" (Japanese: がんばれティオ☆メラメラサンバ祭り)	Tatsufumi Itō	Kiyoko Yoshimura	November 5, 2005
The Flame Country's Samba Festival has finally arrived, but Bright has a different idea.
33	"Bumo Bumo Boomo, Pumo Pumo Poomo"; Transliteration: "Bumo Bumo Buumo ☆ Pumo Pumo Pūmo" (Japanese: ブモブモブウモ☆プモプモプーモ)	Daisuke Tsukushi	Yoshifumi Fukushima	November 12, 2005
34	"Shine, Rainbow Springs! Mirlo's Wish"; Transliteration: "Kagayake! Niji no izumi ☆ Miruro no negai" (Japanese: 輝け！虹の泉☆ミルロの願い)	Katsumi Ono	Hiro Masaki	November 19, 2005
In the Waterdrop Kingdom, the Rainbow Springs were all combined and turned black by Bright.
35	"Close Call: Princess Summit"; Transliteration: "Kikiippatsu ☆ Purinsesu samitto" (Japanese: 危機一髪☆プリンセスサミット)	Kōta Okuno	Michihiro Tsuchiya	November 26, 2005
The princesses call a Princess/Prince Summit to discuss the future of the Star.
36	"Dark Bright: Stormy Princess Party"; Transliteration: "Dāku na buraito ☆ Arashi no purinsesu pāti" (Japanese: ダークなブライト☆嵐のプリンセスパーティ)	Takayuki Fukuda	Kiyoko Yoshimura	December 3, 2005
37	"Find the Seven Treasures! The Secret of the Grace Stones"; Transliteration: "Nanatsu no takara o sagase ☆ Gureisu sutōn no himitsu" (Japanese: 7つの宝を探せ☆グレイス・ストーンの秘密)	Makoto Nagao	Rika Nakase	December 10, 2005
An old friend appears and reveals himself as Princess Grace' messenger.
38	"The Secret Valley of the Winds: Sophie's Treasure"; Transliteration: "Kaze no tani no himitsu ☆ Sofī no takaramono" (Japanese: 風の谷の秘密☆ソフィーの宝物)	Kōta Okuno	Yoshifumi Fukushima	December 17, 2005
In search of the grace stone, Sophie helps them with her treasure that she found.
39	"Pearl's Wish: The Christmas Miracle"; Transliteration: "Pāru-chan no inori ☆ Kurisumasu no kiseki" (Japanese: パールちゃんの祈り☆クリスマスの奇跡)	Daisuke Tsukushi	Natsuko Takahashi	December 24, 2005
As Bright returns to the Sea Kingdom while looking for the grace stone, he is doing something to the Mother Coral.
40	"Year's First Laugh: Flaming Variety Show"; Transliteration: "Hatsu warai ☆ Meramera engeikai" (Japanese: 初笑い☆メラメラ演芸会)	Makoto Sokuza	Michihiro Tsuchiya	January 7, 2006
The next Stone Grace was in Flame Kingdom. Lione tries to help Fine and Rein to get the grace stone on the mouth of the Dragon.
41	"Hyperactive Baby: Parenting Diary"; Transliteration: "Bakuretsu beibī ☆ Kosodate nikki" (Japanese: 爆裂ベイビー☆子育て日記)	Tatsufumi Itō	Hiro Masaki	January 14, 2006
The next Grace Stone is in the Water Drop Kingdom when Fine and Rein are helped by Milro to get the grace stone. Bright interrupts and asks to take care of Narlo.
42	"Get the Grass Full Moon: Rescue Moon Malia"; Transliteration: "Getto da mangetsusō ☆ Mūn Maria o sukue!" (Japanese: ゲットだ満月草☆ムーンマリアを救え！)	Takayuki Fukuda	Kiyoko Yoshimura	January 21, 2006
The princesses head to the Moon Kingdom for the next Grace Stone, but only to find out Moon Malia has fallen into a deep slumber. A brief moment of jealousy is shown on Fine's side, as it appears Shade finds Rein more reliable than her.
43	"The Miraculous Circus: Fly, Nacchi!"; Transliteration: "Mirakuru sākasu ☆ Tobe! Natchi" (Japanese: ミラクルサーカス☆とべ！ナッチ)	Kōta Okuno	Yoshifumi Fukushima	January 28, 2006
When the princesses visit the Seed Kingdom to obtain another Grace Stone, Rein and Fine are attacked by the King out of the blue. Afterwards, the princesses and the gang stumble upon a circus and a very discouraged trapeze performer, Nacchi.
44	"Aim for Victory: Shall We Dance?"; Transliteration: "Mezase yūshō ☆ Sharu wi dansu?" (Japanese: めざせ優勝☆シャル・ウィ・ダンス？)	Takechika Narikawa	Michihiro Tsuchiya	February 4, 2006
The Last Princess Party will be held in the Windmill Kingdom where the participants must dance.
45	"The Last Party: Who Will Win?!"; Transliteration: "Saigo no pāti ☆ Shōri wa dare no te ni!?" (Japanese: 最後のパーティ☆勝利は誰の手に！？)	Katsumi Ono	Rika Nakase	February 11, 2006
A rumor spreads that the Sunny Kingdoms treasure is hidden deep within the Windmill Kingdoms maze, where the princesses and princes go to investigate and get lost because of Bright's dirty tricks.
46	"Go? Won't Go? Invitation From Bright"; Transliteration: "Iku? Ikanai? ☆ Buraito kara no shōtaijō" (Japanese: 行く？行かない？☆ブライトからの招待状)	Hazuki Mizumoto	Kiyoko Yoshimura	February 18, 2006
Bright takes over the Sunny Kingdom and sends an invitation out to everyone, including the princesses, to celebrate his rising as King. Everyone agrees to not attend but Fine goes back on her own and tries to convince Bright to stop hurting his friends. Doing so, Fine realizes that the good side of Bright still exists. Boomo manages to convince Bright to take control of Fine, but before he could the rest of the gang arrive. They leave Sunny Kingdom which is now engulfed in darkness as Fine receives a scolding from Shade.
47	"Tables Turned: The Prince of Darkness"; Transliteration: "Gyakuten ☆ Yami no purinsu" (Japanese: 逆転☆闇のプリンス)	Daisuke Tsukushi	Hiro Masaki	February 25, 2006
The princesses head to the Moon Kingdom to find the Grace stone to stop Bright and help Moon Malia.
48	"The Final Treasure: Boomo is in Love?!"; Transliteration: "Saigo no takara ☆ Koisuru buumo!?" (Japanese: 最後の宝☆恋するブウモ!?)	Kōta Okuno	Michihiro Tsuchiya	March 4, 2006
The Princesses go back to the Sunny Kingdom without Shade, only to discover a diary belonged to a previous Sunny Kingdom Princess years ago, which contains information on where the last Grace Stone is in the Sea Kingdom. While the Princesses go to the Sea Kingdom, Boomo and Pearl try find the Grace Stone together where Boomo fails in love.
49	"May Our Hearts Reach Bright!"; Transliteration: "Min'na no kokoro ☆ Todoke, Buraito ni!" (Japanese: みんなの心☆届け、ブライトに！)	Takechika Narikawa	Yoshifumi Fukushima	March 11, 2006
Bright returns to the Jewelry Kingdom to find out even his home has become a saddened place.
50	"Black Crystal On a Rampage"; Transliteration: "Daibōsō! ☆ Burakku kurisutaru" (Japanese: 大暴走！☆ブラッククリスタル)	Katsumi Ono	Kiyoko Yoshimura	March 18, 2006
Bright falls in love with Rein and releases the anger away from himself.
51	"The Final Prominence: The Princesses Won't Give Up!"; Transliteration: "Fainaru purominensu ☆ Purinsesu wa akiramenai!" (Japanese: ファイナルプロミネンス☆プリンセスはあきらめない！)	Kōta Okuno	Kiyoko Yoshimura	March 25, 2006
The princesses defeat the Black Crystal as Poomo disappears.

== See also ==
- List of Twin Princess of Wonder Planet Gyu! episodes
