= Eigo Kawashima =

Japanese singer

Kawashima Eigo 河島英五
- Born: 23 April 1952; Higashiōsaka, Osaka Prefecture, Japan
- Died: 16 April 2001 (aged 48) Higashiōsaka, Osaka Prefecture, Japan
- Genres: Kayōkyoku, folk
- Occupations: Singer, songwriter
- Years active: 1971–2001

Eigo Kawashima (河島英五, Kawashima Eigo; 23 April 1952 – 16 April 2001) was a Japanese singer-songwriter.

== Career ==
In 1969, Kawashima began singing folk songs as a student at Osaka Prefectural Hanazono High School in Higashiōsaka, Osaka Prefecture. After graduating, Kawashima was active in a group called Homo Sapiens and then debuted with the Kyoto indie record label Kyoto Record. His looks and vocal style led some to call him the second coming of Takuro Yoshida.

In 1973, Kawashima began his solo career and released his debut solo album Jinrui in 1975 . In 1976, Kawashima released his first hit single "Sake to Namida to Otoko to Onna" ("Drinks, Tears, a Man and a Woman"). Kawashima wrote "Sake to Namida to Otoko to Onna" at the age of 19, inspired by the figure of his uncle. The song became known nationwide after it was used in a TV commercial for Kizakura, a Kyoto brewery, and is considered one of his greatest hits. In 1984, Kawashima released the hit single "Nofuuzo", a cover of a 1980 song composed by Hiroyuki Yamamoto. The song title "Nofuuzo" is a word from the Chūgoku dialect of Japanese roughly meaning "rebellious" or "cheeky". In 1986, Kawashima released another hit single "Jidai Okure" ("Old-fashioned"), a song which saw numerous covers and remains a popular karaoke choice to this day among older men.

On 16 April 2001, Kawashima died of liver disease at a hospital in Higashiōsaka, a week before his 49th birthday. Kawashima was buried at a Shingon Buddhist temple in Nara.

== Discography ==
=== Original albums ===
- Jinrui – 1975
- Unmei – 1976 (Up until this point, albums were sold under "Eigo Kawashima and Homo Sapiens".)
- Shinbō – 1977
- Jinsei – 1978
- Collected Works of Eigo Kawashima – 1979
- Homo Sapiens Mongai Fu Shutsu – 1979
- Bunmei I – 1980
- Bunmei II – 1980
- Bunmei III – 1980
- Hakkan – 1985
- Jidai Okure – 1986
- Romantist – 1987
- Kisetsu – 1988
- Ikutsu Ka No Bamen – 1991

=== Live albums ===
- Live Tenbin Bakari – 1975
- Eigo Kawashima Last Live ~ Kyou wa Hontou ni Arigato – 1975

=== Collaborations ===
- Unagitani (鰻谷) – Aki Yashiro
- Sayonara Anta (さよならあんた) – Aki Yashiro
- Tsuki no Hanamatsuri (月の花まつり) – Aki Yashiro
