= List of Twin Princess of Wonder Planet Gyu! episodes =

no
- No. of episodes: 52

Release
- Original network: TV Tokyo
- Original release: April 1, 2006 – March 31, 2007

Season chronology
- ← Previous; Twin Princess of Wonder Planet

Twin Princess of Wonder Planet Gyu! is a 2006 Japanese sequel to the anime television series Twin Princess of Wonder Planet. The anime series was produced by Nihon Ad Systems under the direction of Junichi Sato and consists of fifty-two episodes. The series was first broadcast on TV Tokyo in Japan between April 1, 2006, and March 31, 2007.

Three pieces of theme music are used for the first season—one opening theme and two closing themes. The opening theme is "Kimi no Ashita" (キミのアシタ) performed by Flip-Flap. The first closing theme is "Gakuen Tengoku" (学園天国) performed by Fine☆Rein and the second closing theme is "Churuchu Rock!" (チュルッチュ☆ロック!) performed by Wonder☆5.

== Episode list ==
No.	Title	Directed by	Written by	Original release date
1	"A New School ☆ Aim For a Million Friends"; Transliteration: "Atarashī gakkō ☆ Mezase tomodachi 100-man'nin" (Japanese: 新しい学校☆目指せ友だち100万人)	Takayuki Fukuda	Rika Nakase	April 1, 2006
Fine and Rein, along with other princesses, leave Fushigi-boshi to attend the Royal Wonder Academy of Education. This prestigious institution is the school where Princes and Princesses from all of the planets come to receive their certification to become Kings and Queens. Upon arrival at the school, When Fine and Rein Rang the bell they become the Universal Princesses.
2	"The Making Friends at the Academy Plan ☆ The Kigurumi Dance"; Transliteration: "Gakuen nakayoshi keikaku☆Kigurumi dance" (Japanese: 学園仲良し計画☆着ぐるみダンス)	Daisuke Tsukushi	Rika Nakase	April 8, 2006
Fine and Rein had touched the Soleil Bell, and obtained the power of the Universal Princesses. Contrary to praise and surrounding, the Head Teacher took their Bell Badges and the Angels as well. Not only that, because Rein and Fine learned that the school rule says that it was forbidden to have friends. Countless students have been caught up, but they still tried to open a party for them to be all friends.
3	"The Smiling Older Brother and Younger Sister ☆ Lemon and Melon"; Transliteration: "Owarai Kyōdai ☆ Remon to Meron" (Japanese: お笑い兄妹☆レモンとメロン)	Kōta Okuno	Michihiro Tsuchiya	April 15, 2006
School life has finally started. Fine and Rein is in the same class. Tamba Rin's their homeroom teacher, and takes place on the group lesson. Then, the female students stare intensely at Rein and Fine. They met a girl named Lemon, the Princess of Planet Naniwan. Lemon does not work quite with Fine and Rein's talent in comedy, but she decides to partner with them and make a comic dialogue. While practicing, however, Lemon seems to suffer from a trauma brought about his brother, Melon.
4	"Suddenly Dropping Out of School!? ☆ The First Lesson"; Transliteration: "Ikinari taigaku ~!?☆ Hajimete no jugyō" (Japanese: いきなり退学～!?☆初めての授業)	Tatsufumi Itō	Yoshifumi Fukushima	April 22, 2006
The two Angels, Pyupyu and Kyukyu creates mischief, and interferes the class of Fine and Rein. At this rate they'll have to drop out very quickly if their points turned to -100 points. Also, If they will use magic in class hours, it will deduct 5 points. But defying the afternoon classes, the twins will caught up in unexpected trouble...
5	"Academy News ☆ Rein's Becoming a Lady Announcer"; Transliteration: "Gakuen Nyūsu ☆ Rein no Joshi-ana dai sakusen" (Japanese: 学園ニュース☆レインの女子アナ大作戦)	Yoshitaka Fujimoto	Natsuko Takahashi	April 29, 2006
Rein wants to make more friends and saw Toma do a report and got a brilliant idea. She made broadcasting her club. She reported about the trees getting cut down and the dangers it brings upon the birds.
6	"Club Activity ☆ Fine's Big Fart Experiment"; Transliteration: "Kurabu Katsudō ☆ Fain no Onara Dai Jikken" (Japanese: クラブ活動☆ファインのおなら大実験)	Shunji Yoshida	Hiro Masaki	May 6, 2006
Fine look around the club activities in school, since Rein became busy with the School News. Our field staff have to encountered odds with the Science Club. Fine have heard that it ceased because everyone wants to do different experiments, each member is not helping the director of the Science. The director said to Fine that it was an experiment using fart.
7	"Mischievous Angels ☆ The Town's in an Uproar!?"; Transliteration: "Itazura tenshi ☆ Machi wa ōsawagi!?" (Japanese: いたずら天使☆街は大騒ぎ!?)	Daisuke Tsukushi	Kiyoko Yoshimura	May 13, 2006
The Angels are causing mischief everywhere and suddenly Toma appears and summons. Fine and Rein save us again.
8	"Small Solo's ☆ Huge Determination"; Transliteration: "Chīsana Soro no ☆ Dekkai ketsui" (Japanese: 小さなソロの☆でっかい決意)	Kei Oikawa	Rika Nakase	May 20, 2006
Solo attempts to join the fencing club later he gets help from Fine and Rein. As usual Toma summons a bunch of evil things, As always Fine and Rein save the day.
9	"Crossing Over the Cosmos ☆ Field Trip Survival"; Transliteration: "Uchū o koete ☆ Ensoku sabaibaru" (Japanese: 宇宙をこえて☆遠足サバイバル)	Kōta Okuno	Michihiro Tsuchiya	May 27, 2006
10	"Cut Off Friendship ☆ Lione's Sincerity"; Transliteration: "Todaeta yūjō ☆ riōne no ma-gokoro" (Japanese: 途絶えた友情☆リオーネのまごころ)	Takayuki Fukuda	Yoshifumi Fukushima	June 3, 2006
11	"Heating Up! ☆ The Décor of First Love"; Transliteration: "Atsui ze! ☆ Hatsukoi no dekōru" (Japanese: 熱いぜ!☆初恋のデコール)	Yoshitaka Fujimoto	Natsuko Takahashi	June 10, 2006
The twins helps Caroline make decor that was filled of her burning emotions for Taori.
12	"The Twins in a Pinch! ☆ Heart-Pounding Presentation to the Public Lesson"; Transliteration: "Futa go pinchi! ☆ Dokidoki no kōkai jugyō" (Japanese: ふたごピンチ！☆ドキドキの公開授業)	Shunji Yoshida	Hiro Masaki	June 17, 2006
13	"The Angels and the Quarrel ☆ Pyupyu's Running Away From Home"; Transliteration: "Tenshi to kenka ☆ Pyupyu no iede" (Japanese: 天使とケンカ☆ピュピュの家出)	Hazuki Mizumoto	Kiyoko Yoshimura	June 24, 2006
The teachers and the twins friends (except for Shade & bright) got sick because of the cold, rainy weather, as Fine got medicine from Shade, Pyupyu broke it and lt led to their quarrel, causing Pyupyu to run away from home.
14	"Mystery Tour ☆ The Puzzle of the Non-Opening Door"; Transliteration: "Misuterī tsuā ☆ Akazu no tobira no nazo" (Japanese: ミステリーツアー☆開かずの扉のナゾ)	Daisuke Tsukushi	Yoshifumi Fukushima	July 1, 2006
15	"Toma's Conspiracy ☆ The Stage's Sweet Trap!"; Transliteration: "Tōma no inbō ☆ Sutēji no amai wana!" (Japanese: トーマの陰謀☆ステージの甘い罠！)	Takayuki Fukuda	Rika Nakase	July 8, 2006
16	"The Truth About Toma ☆ True Companion"; Transliteration: "Tōma no shinsō ☆ Hontō no nakama" (Japanese: トーマの真相☆本当の仲間)	Kōta Okuno	Michihiro Tsuchiya	July 15, 2006
17	"Finally Summer Vacation! ☆ Panic Over a Test?"; Transliteration: "Iyoiyo natsuyasumi! ☆ Tesuto de dai panikku?" (Japanese: いよいよ夏休み！☆テストで大パニック？)	Yoshitaka Fujimoto	Kiyoko Yoshimura	July 22, 2006
18	"It's Summer! Take Care in Camp"; Transliteration: "Natsu da! ☆ Kyanpu ni goyōjin" (Japanese: 夏だ！☆キャンプにご用心)	Shunji Yoshida	Natsuko Takahashi	July 29, 2006
19	"We're Home! ☆ The Mysterious Planet"; Transliteration: "Tadaima! ☆ Fushigi hoshi" (Japanese: ただいま！☆ふしぎ星)	Tatsufumi Itō	Yoshifumi Fukushima	August 5, 2006
Fine and Rein arrive at Fushigi-Boshi along with Elizabeth and Fango.
20	"Rein In a Pinch! ☆ Uproar Over Empty Love"; Transliteration: "Rein, pinchi! ☆ Koi no karasawagi" (Japanese: レイン、ピンチ！☆恋のから騒ぎ)	Yoshitaka Fujimoto	Hiro Masaki	August 12, 2006
21	"Holidays at the Beach ☆ Fango and the Making Friends Plan"; Transliteration: "Umi de bakansu ☆ fango to nakayoshi keikaku" (Japanese: 海でバカンス☆ファンゴと仲良し計画)	Takayuki Fukuda	Michihiro Tsuchiya	August 19, 2006
22	"New School Term Soon ☆ Chiffon In the Crossfire"; Transliteration: "Mōsugu shingakki ☆ Nerawareta shifon" (Japanese: もうすぐ新学期☆狙われたシフォン)	Satoshi Ōsedo	Rika Nkase	August 26, 2006
23	"No Choice But to Do It! ☆ The Point Up Strategy"; Transliteration: "Yaru kkya nai! ☆ Pointo appu daisakusen" (Japanese: やるっきゃない！☆ポイントアップ大作戦)	Yoshitaka Fujimoto	Kiyoko Yoshimura	September 2, 2005
24	"Jump, Fine! ☆ The Sweat and Tears of Puribauaa"; Transliteration: "Tobe Fain! ☆ Ase to namida no puribauā" (Japanese: 跳べファイン！☆汗と涙のプリバウアー)	Shunji Yoshida	Yoshifumi Fukushima	September 9, 2006
25	"Aim for Victory! ☆ The Dance Contest"; Transliteration: "Mezase yūshō! ☆ Dansu kontesuto" (Japanese: 目指せ優勝！☆ダンスコンテスト)	Yoshitaka Fujimoto	Natsuko Takahashi	September 16, 2006
26	"Congratulations! ☆ The Angels' Half Birthday"; Transliteration: "Omedetō! ☆ Tenshi no hāfu bāsudei" (Japanese: おめでとう！☆天使のハーフバースデイ)	Hirokazu Yamada	Kiyoko Yoshimura	September 23, 2006
27	"Rescue the Angels! ☆ The Prince of Darkness"; Transliteration: "Tenshi o sukue! ☆ Ankoku no purinsu" (Japanese: 天使を救え！☆暗黒のプリンス)	Takayuki Fukuda	Rika Nakase	September 30, 2006
28	"The Evil Honor Student ☆ Bibin Appears"; Transliteration: "Aku no yūtōsei ☆ Bibin tōjō" (Japanese: 悪の優等生☆ビビン登場)	Kōta Okuno	Michihiro Tsuchiya	October 7, 2006
29	"Leave It to Rein ☆ The Heart-Pounding Love Letter"; Transliteration: "Rein ni omakase ☆ Dokidoki rabu retā" (Japanese: レインにおまかせ☆どきどきラブレター)	Yoshitaka Fujimoto	Kiyoko Yoshimura	October 14, 2006
30	"Revival ☆ The Prince of Darkness"; Transliteration: "Fukkatsu ☆ Ankoku no purinsu" (Japanese: 復活☆暗黒のプリンス)	Shunji Yoshida	Yoshifumi Fukushima	October 21, 2006
31	"In the Sand of Hearts ☆ A Happy Date?!"; Transliteration: "Hāto no suna de ☆ Happī dēto!?" (Japanese: ハートの砂で☆ハッピーデート！？)	Nanako Shimazaki	Natsuko Takahashi	October 28, 2006
The Twins has been told about a hot dating spot called "Happy Park" where couples mostly date, Rein has gathered Love Dust from the fountain for they were said to be able to protect your love, but unfortunately for them Bibin has already put an Unhappy Fruit in the fountain.
32	"Pyupyu and Kyukyu's ☆ First Errand"; Transliteration: "Pyupyu to Kyukyu ☆ Hajimete no otsukai" (Japanese: ピュピュとキュキュ☆初めてのお使い)	Yoshitaka Fujimoto	Rika Nakase	November 4, 2006
33	"Great Detective Twin Princesses ☆ Who Is the Culprit?!"; Transliteration: "Meitantei futago hime ☆ Han'nin wa dare da!?" (Japanese: 名探偵ふたご姫☆犯人は誰だ!?)	Satoshi Ōsedo	Michihiro Tsuchiya	November 11, 2006
34	"Toma's Patience ♨ Steam Excursion"; Transliteration: "Tōma no shinbō ♨ Yukemuri shūgakuryokō" (Japanese: トーマの辛抱♨湯けむり修学旅行)	Takayuki Fukuda	Kiyoko Yoshimura	November 18, 2006
35	"Toma's Kindness ☆ Protect the Forest of Memories"; Transliteration: "Tōma no ninjō ☆ Omoide no mori o mamore" (Japanese: トーマの人情☆思い出の森を守れ)	Yoshitaka Fujimoto	Rika Nakase	November 25, 2006
36	"Who is the Bride? ☆ The Super Celeb Princess Party"; Transliteration: "Hanayome wa dare? ☆ Chō serebu na purinsesu pāti" (Japanese: 花嫁は誰？☆超セレブなプリンセス・パーティ)	Shunji Yoshida	Yoshifumi Fukushima	December 2, 2006
37	"What Will Bibin Do?! ☆ The Twins' Tea Party"; Transliteration: "Dōsuru Bibin!? ☆ Futago no ochakai" (Japanese: どうするビビン!?☆ふたごのお茶会)	Kōta Okuno	Natsuko Takahashi	December 9, 2006
38	"Do Your Best, Noche ♪ A New Melody"; Transliteration: "Ganbaru Nōche ♪ Atarashī merodi" (Japanese: 頑張るノーチェ♪新しいメロディ)	Yoshitaka Fujimoto	Michihiro Tsuchiya	December 16, 2006
39	"Happy Christmas ☆ The 'Get along with Bibin'-Plan"; Transliteration: "Happī Kurisumasu ☆ Bibin to nakayoshi keikaku" (Japanese: ハッピークリスマス☆ビビンとなかよし計画)	Kei Oikawa	Kiyoko Yoshimura	December 23, 2006
40	"New Year Cart Race ☆ Who Will Get the New Year's Gift?!"; Transliteration: "Shinshun kāto rēsu ☆ Otoshidama wa dare no te ni!?" (Japanese: 新春カートレース☆お年玉は誰の手に!?)	Satoshi Ōsedo	Natsuko Takahashi	January 6, 2007
41	"Pyupyu's First Love ♥ Bibin's Trap"; Transliteration: "Pyupyu no hatsukoi ♥ Bibin no wana" (Japanese: ピュピュの初恋♥ビビンのワナ)	Kōta Okuno	Rika Nakase	January 13, 2007
42	"Fine is a Wife? ☆ Nervous Noche"; Transliteration: "Fain ga oyomesan? ☆ Dokidoki nōche" (Japanese: ファインがお嫁さん？☆どきどきノーチェ)	Shunji Yoshida	Michihiro Tsuchiya	January 20, 2007
Noche's father goes to Royal Wonder Academy and meets Fine after getting hit by a soccer ball on the face, he declares that Fine must marry Noche if Noche wins the game of soccer.
43	"Subtraction Paradise ☆ Rampaging March"; Transliteration: "Genten paradaisu ☆ Daibōsō māchi" (Japanese: 減点パラダイス☆大暴走マーチ)	Takayuki Fukuda	Kiyoko Yoshimura	January 27, 2007
44	"Clash! ☆ Fango and Fingo"; Transliteration: "Gekitotsu! ☆ Fango to fingo" (Japanese: 激突!☆ファンゴとフィンゴ)	Satoshi Ōsedo	Yoshifumi Fukushima	February 3, 2007
Fango's younger brother has comes to the academy to challenge Fango in a fight! If Fingo wins, Fango must go back home.
45	"Elizabeth in Love ♥ The Hand-Made Valentine"; Transliteration: "Koisuru Erizabēta ♥ Tezukuri Barentain" (Japanese: 恋するエリザベータ♥手作りバレンタイン)	Kōta Okuno	Michihiro Tsuchiya	February 10, 2007
Elizabeth wants to make chocolate for Valentines Day. Fine and Rein help Elizabeth while making their own chocolates for Shade and Bright.
46	"Tearful Farewell ☆ Team Celeb Breaks Up?!"; Transliteration: "Namida no wakare ☆ Kaisan!? Chīmu Serebu" (Japanese: 涙の別れ☆解散!?チームセレブ)	Daisuke Tsukushi	Rika Nakase	February 17, 2007
Due to the fact Elizabeth wants Fango to be her friend (also that she likes him) she decides to make a tea party for her and Fango. Though Carla and Sasha want to help her, Elizabeth gets mad at them because they said bad things about Fango. Rein and Fine try to help them out
47	"The Three Samurai ☆ Do Your Best, Bright"; Transliteration: "Sanbiki no samurai ☆ Ganbare Buraito" (Japanese: 三匹のサムライ☆頑張れブライト)	Nanako Shimazaki	Kiyoko Yoshimura	February 24, 2007
48	"The Flower of Happiness ☆ Shade's Treasure"; Transliteration: "Happī no hana ☆ Sheido no takaramono" (Japanese: ハッピーの花☆シェイドの宝物)	Shunji Yoshida	Natsuko Takahashi	March 3, 2007
49	"The Twins VS Bibin ☆ The Final Confrontation!"; Transliteration: "Futago VS Bibin ☆ Saigo no taiketsu!" (Japanese: ふたごVSビビン☆最後の対決！)	Katsumi Ono	Yoshifumi Fukushima	March 10, 2007
50	"The Black Crystal King Appears ☆ The Academy's Crisis"; Transliteration: "Burakku kurisutaru kingu tōjō ☆ Gakuen no kiki" (Japanese: ブラッククリスタルキング登場☆学園の危機)	Satoshi Ōsedo	Kiyoko Yoshimura	March 17, 2007
51	"Reach For It! ☆ The Miraculous Prominence"; Transliteration: "Todoke! ☆ Kiseki no purominensu" (Japanese: 届け！☆奇跡のプロミネンス)	Takayuki Fukuda	Michihiro Tsuchiya	March 24, 2007
52	"Resound! ☆ The Bell of Peace"; Transliteration: "Narihibike! ☆ Heiwa no beru" (Japanese: 鳴りひびけ！☆平和のベル)	Kōta Okuno	Rika Nakase	March 31, 2007
Fine and Rein fight the Black Crystal King and defeat him, but this causes them to lose their hearts. Bright and Shade bring them back. With the Black Crystal King defeated, a purified Ed leaves Bibin and she returns to her home planet while the Royal Wonder Academy celebrates.

== See also ==
- List of Fushigiboshi no Futagohime episodes
