= Finger 5 =

Japanese pop group

Finger 5 フィンガー5
- Origin: Gushikawa, Okinawa Prefecture, Japan
- Genres: J-pop; kayōkyoku
- Years active: 1972–1978; 2003
- Label: King Records; Philips; Polydor Records
- Past members: Kazuo Tamamoto; Mitsuo Tamamoto; Masao Tamamoto; Akira Tamamoto; Taeko Tamamoto; Minoru Gushiken; Hiroshi Yasu
- Website: Official site

Finger 5 (フィンガー5, Fingā Faibu) was a Japanese pop group, initially composed of the four Okinawan Tamamoto brothers Kazuo, Mitsuo, Masao, Akira, and sister Taeko. Their greatest hit was "Koi no Dial 6700" (恋のダイヤル6700; "Love Dial 6700").

The Okinawa-based group performed catchy songs, wore matching outfits and had choreographed dance routines. They even performed cover versions of Motown hits, including those of the Jackson 5. The band was formed in 1967 with only the three brothers Kazuo, Mitsuo and Masao, who performed as All Brothers. Conveniently their father owned a bar in Okinawa at which they performed. After winning a local talent contest it was decided that they could go farther if based in Tokyo, although at the time the eldest brother Kazuo was still only 14. The group, who were partly inspired by the Partridge Family TV show, struggled in the Tokyo area, often playing at venues that catered to US military, as they had done in Okinawa.

In 1970, they signed with King Records as the Baby Brothers, but their three releases did not sell well. In early 1972 Akira and Taeko were added to the group and they became Finger Five. Later that year they debuted on the Philips label, with First Album, and scored a huge hit with the single “Kojin Jugyo (Private Lessons)" in 1973. “Kojin Jugyo” sold almost a million and a half copies, and follow-up singles "Koi no Dial 6700 (Love Call 6700)" and “Gakuen Tengoku” were also major hits.

Their songs were primarily about school life and puppy love, and most of their fans were youngsters. After working hard for years, the group had attained superstar status. They became regulars on the weekly TV show Ginza NOW, and made the movies Hello Finger Five, Chonoryoku Dayo! Zenin Shugo and Finger Five No Dai Boken, all of which were released in 1974. That year they also held a joint concert with Canada’s De Franco Family. The group, however, were not able to hold on to their popstar crown very long. In 1975, Kazuo dropped out of the group, and his cousin Minoru Gushiken replaced him. The group was feeling overwhelmed by the sudden stardom thrust on them, and after a goodbye tour, relocated to the United States for late 1975 and early 1976. Besides catching their breath, the members wanted to approach their craft more seriously and evolve beyond being “idols”. However, in their absence, interest in the group waned, and when they returned to release their more mature music, sales evaporated.

In 1978, Finger 5 disbanded, although some members have attempted comebacks, in 1980 as Fingers, 1985 as Zapp, in 1991 as Finger Five, in 1992 as Finger Five Soul Band, and in 1994 as AM Fingers.

== Former members ==
- Kazuo Tamamoto (玉元 一夫, Tamamoto Kazuo) (born April 8, 1955) - lead guitar, backing vocals (1972–1975)
- Mitsuo Tamamoto (玉元 光男, Tamamoto Mitsuo) (born February 3, 1957) - drums, backing vocals (1972–1978)
- Masao Tamamoto (玉元 正男, Tamamoto Masao) (born February 2, 1959) - bass, backing vocals (1972–1978)
- Akira Tamamoto (玉元 晃, Tamamoto Akira) (born May 9, 1961) - lead vocals, rhythm guitar (1972–1978)
- Taeko Tamamoto (玉元 妙子, Tamamoto Taeko) (born June 7, 1962) - keyboards, backing vocals (1972–1978)
- Minoru Gushiken (具志堅 実, Gushiken Minoru) (born January 23, 1967) - lead guitar, backing vocals (1975–1978)
- Hiroshi Yasu (安 広司, Yasu Hiroshi) (born April 29, 1960) (1978)

== Discography ==
=== Singles ===
Baby Brothers

- "Watashi no Koibito-san" (私の恋人さん; "My Lover") (June 20, 1970)
- "Jingle Bells" (ジングルベル, Jinguru Beru) (October 20, 1970)
- "Shiroi Tenshi" (白い天使; "White Angel") (November 20, 1970)

Finger 5

- "Kiddy Kiddy Love" (キディ・キディ・ラブ, Kidi Kidi Rabu) (August 25, 1972)
- "Kojin Jugyō" (個人授業; "Individual Lessons") (August 25, 1973)
- "Christmas Party with Finger 5" (フィンガー5とクリスマス・パーティー, Fingā Faibu to Kurisumasu Pātī) (December 1, 1973)
- "Koi no Dial 6700" (恋のダイヤル6700（シックスセブンオーオー）, Koi no Dairaru Shikkusu Sebun Ō Ō; "Love Dial 6700") (December 5, 1973)
- "Gakuen Tengoku" (学園天国; "School Heaven") (March 5, 1974)
- "Koi no American Football" (恋のアメリカン・フットボール, Koi no Amerikan Futtobōru; "American Football Love") (June 25, 1974)
- "Koi no Daiyogen" (恋の大予言; "The Great Prophecy of Love") (September 10, 1974)
- "Christmas Party with Finger 5" (フィンガー5とクリスマス・パーティー, Fingā Faibu to Kurisumasu Pātī) (November 10, 1974)
- "Kareina Uwasa" (華麗なうわさ; "Brilliant Rumors") (December 25, 1974)
- "Meiken Lassie" (名犬ラッシー, Meiken Rasshī; "Famous Dog Lassie") (February 5, 1975)
- "Bump Tengoku" (バンプ天国, Banpu Tengoku; "Bump Heaven") (March 5, 1975)
- "Bokura no Papa wa Karate no Sensei" (ぼくらのパパは空手の先生; "Our Dad Is a Karate Teacher") (June 21, 1975)
- "Kaette Kuru yo" (帰ってくるよ; "I'll Be Back") (November 21, 1975)
- "Jet Machine" (ジェット・マシーン, Jetto Mashīn) (February 21, 1976)
- "Tobe! Suteki na Baby (飛べ!すてきなベイビー, Tobe! Suteki na Beibī; "Fly! Nice Baby") (June 1, 1976)
- "101 Girlfriends" (101人ガールフレンド, Hyakuichi-nin Gārufurendo) (September 21, 1976)
- "Monroe Walk no Ojōsan" (モンローウォークのお嬢さん, Monrō Uōku no Ojōsan; "Daughter of Monroe Walk") (December 21, 1976)
- "Koi no Lucky Strike" (恋のラッキー・ストライク, Koi no Rakkī Sutoraiku; "Lucky Strike of Love") (May 1, 1977)
- "Supercar Boogie" (スーパーカーブギ, Sūpākā Bugi) (July 21, 1977)
- "Boku wa Nemurenai" (ぼくは眠れない; "I Can't Sleep") (November 1, 1977)
- "Yakimochi Boy" (やきもちボーイ, Yakimochi Bōi) (February 1, 1978)
- "Nayama Senaide" (悩ませないで; "Don't Bother") (June 21, 1978)

=== Studio albums ===
- Kojin Jugyō (個人授業; Private Lesson) (December 5, 1973)
- Gakuen Tengoku (学園天国; School Heaven) (April 10, 1974)
- Watashi no Koibito-san (わたしの恋人さん; My Lover) (May 25, 1974)
- Koi no Daiyogen (恋の大予言; The Great Prophecy of Love) (October 25, 1974)
- Kareina Uwasa (華麗なうわさ; Brilliant Rumors) (February 5, 1975)
- With Love from Jet Machine's New "Finger 5" (ジェット・マシーン ニュー"フィンガー5"から愛をこめて, Jetto Mashīn Nyū "Fingā Faibu" Kara Ai wo Komete) (March 21, 1976)
- Finger 5 NOW!! (フィンガー5 NOW!!, Fingā Faibu Nau!!) (December 21, 1977)

=== Compilation albums ===
- Singles Collection (シングル・コレクション, Shinguru Korekushon) (December 5, 1991)
- Battle Finger 5 ~ Returns (バトル・フィンガー・ファイブ～リターンズ, Batoru Fingā Faibu ~ Ritānzu) (December 21, 1992)
- NEW BEST (May 26, 1993)
- Special 1800 (スペシャル1800, Supesharu Ichi Hachi Ō Ō) (November 21, 1996)
- Finger Ōkoku (フィンガー王国, Fingā Ōkoku; Finger Kingdom) (April 21, 1999)
- Finger Tengoku (フィンガー天国, Fingā Tengoku; Finger Heaven) (April 21, 1999)
- Complete Collection (July 25, 2001)
- Super Value (スーパー・バリュー, Sūpā Baryū) (December 19, 2001)
- Golden Best Finger 5 (ゴールデン☆ベスト フィンガー5, Gōruden ☆ Besuto Fingā Faibu) (November 26, 2003)
- CD&DVD The Best (July 6, 2005)
- Finger 5 Best 10 (フィンガー5 ベスト10, Fingā Faibu Besuto Ten) (December 9, 2005)
- I Want to Sing a Song!! Best Hits & Karaoke (歌が唄いたい!! ベストヒット&カラオケ, Uta ga Utaitai!! Besuto Hitto & Karaoke) (August 30, 2006)
- Revival Kayōkyoku-hen Finger 5 (りばいばる 歌謡曲編 フィンガー5, Ribaibaru Kayōkyoku-hen Fingā Faibu) (November 15, 2006)
- Finger 5 Essential Best (フィンガー5エッセンシャル・ベスト, Fingā Faibu Essensharu Besuto) (December 19, 2007)
- Best & Nonstop Finger 5 (Best&Nonstop フィンガー5, Besuto ando Nonsutoppo Fingā Faibu) (July 25, 2012)

=== Remix albums ===
- Gakuen Tengoku Re Mix Tengoku!! (学園天国・Re Mix天国!!, School Heaven Remix Heaven!!) (August 22, 2001)

=== Boxed sets ===
- Finger 5 Complete CDBOX (フィンガー5コンプリートCDBOX, Fingā 5 Konpurīto Shī Dī Bokkusu) (February 8, 2003)
