= Chiisana Koi no Uta =

2001 song by Mongol800

Song by Mongol800

from the album Message
- Released: September 16, 2001
- Genre: Rock, J-pop
- Length: 3:43
- Label: High Wave, Tissue Freak
- Songwriters: Satoshi Takazato; Kiyosaku Uezu; Takashi Gima
- Producer: Mongol800

Audio video
- "Chiisana Koi no Uta" on YouTube

"Chiisana Koi no Uta" (Japanese: 小さな恋のうた; lit. 'A Small Love Song') is a Japanese rock song written and performed by the Japanese punk band Mongol800. It is featured on their second studio album Message which was released in Japan on September 16, 2001. The song's lyrics are about the love between a boy and a girl who have grown up on a small island.

Despite not being released as a single, "Chiisana Koi no Uta" became one of Mongol800's most well-known songs and has been covered numerous times, most popularly by Amatsuki in 2016. Other cover versions include the insert song for Kase-san and Morning Glories performed by Ayane Sakura. Rie Takahashi performed the song for Teasing Master Takagi-san in 2018, while Manaka Iwami performed the song for The Angel Next Door Spoils Me Rotten in 2023 and Sumire Uesaka for Alya Sometimes Hides Her Feelings in Russian in 2024. The song inspired the production of a live-action movie of the same name, released in May 2019 by Toei.

The song is a popular karaoke song in Japan, ranking first in the DAM karaoke ranking. It is the second song of the 2000s to accumulate 100 million streams after "Hanabi" by Mr. Children. Music critic Tomonori Shiba said the song became popular because of its easy to understand lyrics and simple chord progression.

== Background and release ==
"Chiisana Koi no Uta" is the third track of the Okinawan band's second album Message which was released on September 16, 2001. The album became the first indie album to reach 1 million sales on Oricon.

Music duo Fuki and Tee describe the song's genre to be "rock", while Kyu Nakanashi describes it as "J-pop". The lyrics of the songs were written bassist and vocalist Kiyosaku Uezo while the other band members composed the music. The main key is B major, the time signature is 4/4, and the tempo is 116 Bpm. Gordon Maeda, who played the role of Shinji Fukumura in the movie, said that the simple and repeating chord progression makes "Chiisana Koi no Uta" easy to learn.

In an interview with Rina Sako from Natalie in 2019, Uezo said that he did not know the song's key when he was writing the song, commenting that "Chiisana Koi no Uta" starts in a lower key but with a higher chorus. He also said that he did not use the personal pronouns Boku (僕; lit. I) and Kimi (君; lit. You) while writing the song's lyrics as residents of Okinawa do not to use personal language when speaking, adding that at that time he thought that Anata (あなた; lit. You (Note: "Anata" is a more formal way of saying "You". (See Japanese pronouns))) was more fitting. Music critic Shiba Tomonori stated that the song uses the adjective "Chiisana" (小さな; lit. 'Little') because it "focuses on the relationship with 'you'", rather than bigger things such as wars, nations, and the environment. In a 2019 interview, Gordon Maeda said that he initially thought of "Chiisana Koi no Uta" as a love song but after reading and studying the lyrics for his role he realized that the song expresses the feelings of the band towards Okinawa.

== Cover versions ==
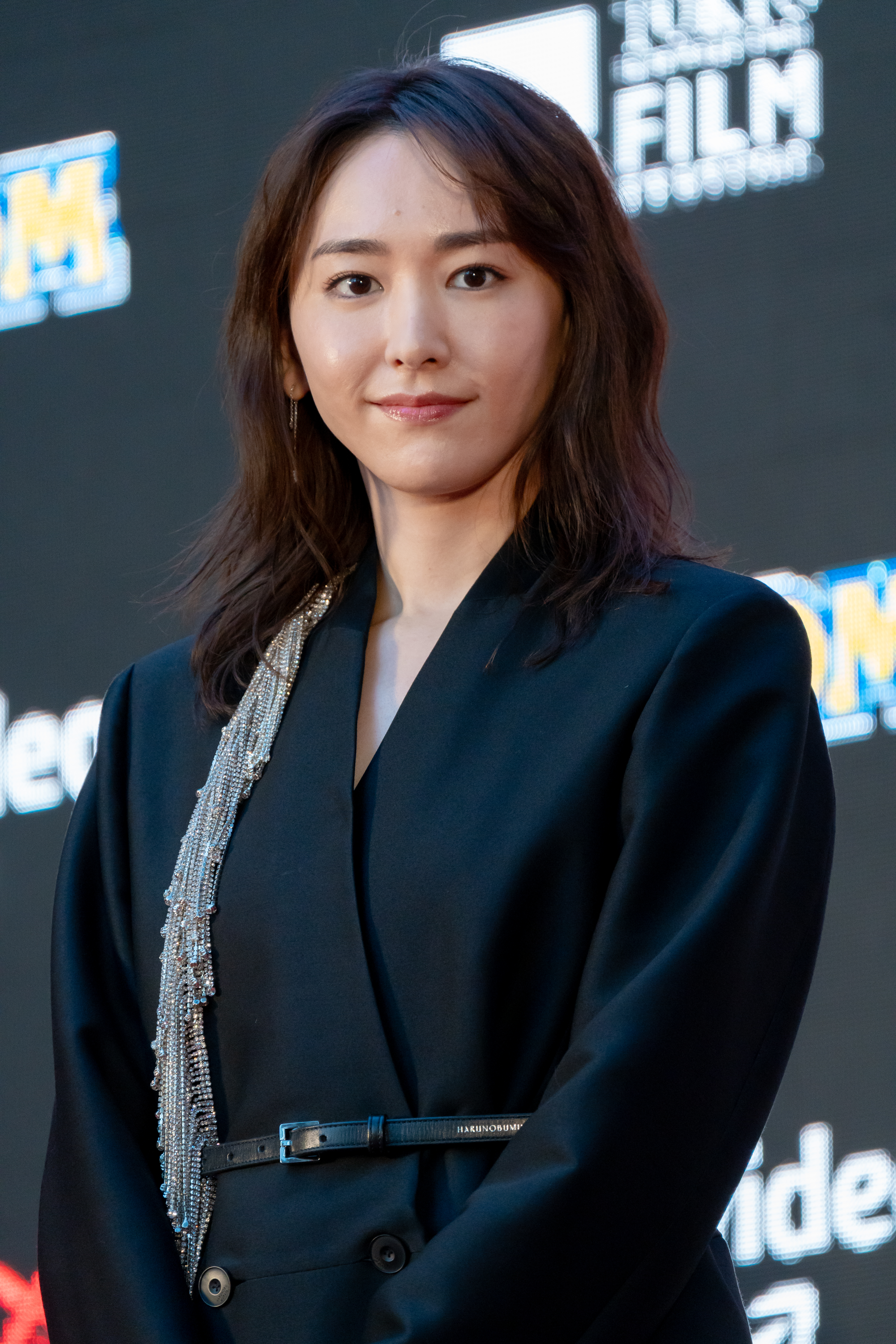
Yui Aragaki, whose cover was certified gold by RIAJ

The song has been covered by Japanese artists numerous times. The most commercially successful version was recorded in 2009 by Yui Aragaki and was certified Gold by the Recording Industry Association of Japan (RIAJ) in the ringtone category. For her cover version, Aragaki invited 3,000 middle and high school students to perform with her.

Amatsuki's cover of the song released on YouTube in May 2016 became a popular hit accumulating over 100 million views; the first cover song to reach 100 million views in Japan. Actress Minami Hamabe released a cover of the song in 2018 which was used in a Line Music campaign. Her cover version charted on the Billboard Japan charts in 2019 when the movie of the same name was released, peaking at 32.

The song was used as an insert song in several episodes of the Japanese dorama series Operation Love, which aired on Japanese television in 2007. The song was also covered by Ayane Sakura as an insert song for the 2018 original video animation Kase-san and Morning Glories, by Rie Takahashi as the fifth ending theme for the 2018 anime Teasing Master Takagi-san, by Manaka Iwami as the ending theme for the 2023 anime The Angel Next Door Spoils Me Rotten, and by performed by Sumire Uesaka as the fifth ending theme of the 2024 anime Alya Sometimes Hides Her Feelings in Russian.

During a special event in the Gunma Prefecture held on June 1, 2024, the song was played simultaneously by 1,000 musicians. The line-up consisted of 200 vocalists, 200 bassists, 500 guitarists, and 100 drummers from all over Japan who were invited to perform the song.

The following is a selected list of artists who have covered "Chiisana Koi no Uta":

Year	Artist	Notes	Ref.
2006	Yurika Ōyama		
2007	Hearts Grow		
2008	Andrew W.K.		
2009	Yui Aragaki	RIAJ: Gold	
2010	Kumi Kōda		
2010	Little Turtles		
2012	BENI		
2012	Kohei Otomo		
2012	Masayuki Suzuki		
2015	FLiP		
2016	Amatsuki		
2018	Minami Hamabe		
2018	Humbert Humbert		
2018	Rie Takahashi	In her role as Takagi-san. Ending theme song of episodes 9–10 (season 1).	
2018	Ayane Sakura and Minami Takahashi	In their respective roles as Tomoka Kase (Sakura) and Yui Yamada (Takahashi).	
2019	Orange Range		
2019	Shishigami Leona and Warabeda Meiji		
2020	JUJU		
2020	Tiara		
2021	Mayu Kondo		
2023	Manaka Iwami	In her role as Mahiru Shiina. Ending theme song for episodes 2–6, 8–11 (season 1).	
2023	WANIMA		
2024	Sumire Uesaka	In her role as Alisa Mikhailovna Kujou. Ending theme song for episode 5 (season 1).	
2024	Salyu	It was used in a Mitsubishi UFJ NICOS commercial.	

== Media usage ==
"Chiisana Koi no Uta" was used as one of the themes in the second volume of the Sutopi Toraberā Hanami (ストピトラベラー花美), a music novel series written by Rinako Shibano for preschoolers which was published on December 19, 2023.

In May 2018, it was announced that a live-action film based on the song was in production. The movie premiered in Japanese cinemas on May 24, 2019. The theme song, a cover of "Chiisana Koi no Uta", was performed by the Chiisana Koi no Uta Band. The members of Mongol800 cameo-ed in the movie. The film was written by Kenya Hirata, directed by Kojiro Hashimoto and starred Hayato Sano as Ryota Maeshiro. It was distributed by Toei. Hirata also wrote a novelization of the film which was published by Kodansha on March 15, 2019.

== Commercial performance ==
Since its release in 2001, the song has become very popular as a karaoke song in Japan. In the Daiichikosho Amusement Multimedia (DAM) rankings compiled by Daiichi Kosho Company, the song ranked first in the most-sung song by a male artist category as well as ranking second in the most popular karaoke song on the DAM Heisei Karaoke Ranking behind "Hanabi" by Mr. Children. Real Sound stated that it is the "most popular song" by a male artist in the Heisei era. The song placed in the top 30 for Oricon's Year End Karaoke charts for eight years. It was ranked 3rd in 2013, 7th in 2014, 10th in 2016, 8th in 2017, 4th in 2018, and 9th in 2019. The song ranked fifth for the first half of 2019 on Karaoke Joysound's ranking. According to JASRAC, "Chiisana Koi no Uta" generated the fourth-highest revenue in ringtone sales in Japan in 2002. According to music critic Tomonori Shiba, the song remained popular even after the commercial success of the band's album Message had died down, commenting that the song "got out of hand" and "stands for itself." Shiba wrote that the song's popularity lies in a simple melody and the straightforward lyrics in sentences that are easy to understand. The song ranked 25th and 38th place in the Oricon Digital Songs and Streaming charts, respectively. On July 8, 2026, the song surpassed 300 million cumulative streams on the latest Oricon Weekly Streaming Ranking.

In December 2021, Billboard Japan reported that the song had accumulated 100 million streams and became the second song of the 2000s – after "Hanabi" by Mr. Children – to reach this milestone. According to Oricon, the song was the third most-listened song of the 2000s on Spotify in Japan, behind "Zenryoku Shōnen" by Sukima Switch and "Hanabi" by Mr. Children. In July 2022, the song was one of the featured songs in FNS Song Festival by Fuji TV.

== Accolades ==
"Chiisana Koi no Uta" was announced to be eligible for a nomination in the categories Best Japanese Song and Best J-Rock Song at the inaugural Music Awards Japan, but received no nominations. In 2019, the song was awarded the Silver Prize at the 3rd NexTone Awards for amassing the second-highest revenue in royalties during the fiscal year of 2018.

== Charts ==
=== Weekly charts ===
Weekly chart performance for "Chiisana Koi no Uta"
Charts	Peak position
Japan (Japan Hot 100)	28
Japan Digital Single (Oricon)	25
Japan Streaming (Oricon)	38

=== Year-end charts ===
Year-end chart performance for "Chiisana Koi no Uta"
Chart (2019)	Position
Japan (Japan Hot 100)	67

2025 year-end chart performance for "Chiisana Koi no Uta"
Chart (2025)	Position
Japan (Japan Hot 100)	95

== Live performances ==
The following are some of the live performances that features "Chiisana Koi no Uta"

Year	Performed by	Event	Ref
2009	Juju	Juju-en (ジュジュ苑)	
2010	Mongol800	Freedom 2010 in Awaji Island "Blue Sky" (FREEDOM 2010 in 淡路島 "青空")	
2010	Mongol800	GG10	
2010	Mongol800	World Happiness (Note: Stylized in all-caps)	
2013	Mongol800	800BEST -simple is the BEST!!-	
2013	Takeshi Hosomi	Arabaki Rock Fest.13	
2014	Sakura Gakuin	The Road to Graduation 2013 ～Happy Valentine～	
2014	Tama & Yappy	Exit Tunes Academy -Exit Tunes 11th Anniversary Special-	
2014	Yuki Yagi (Note: Including 13 other people)	Victor Rock Festival Extra Edition	
2015	DJ Booth	Ayukuma x Charisma	
2015	Mongol800	Live at Budokan ～The Last～	
2015	Mongol800	Gusuku Rock Fes'15	
2015	Mongol800	Satanic Carnival'15	
2015	Masta Simon & Mongol800	Dead Pop Festival 2015	
2015	FLiP	MONGOL800 ga presents 800 All Together!!	
2015	Su-xing-cyu	OTODAMA'15 ~Onsen Tamashii~	
2015	TMRevolution	Inazuma Rock Fest 2015	
2015	Mongol800	MONGOL800 People People TOUR 2015	
2015	Mongol800	Jinmiraisai ~Jinmiraisai~	
2016	Mongol800	Ryukyu Summit in Edo	
2016	Mongol800	Are You Coming? Tour	
2016	Kuchibiru Kin'niku Megane	Rhythmic Toy World with Gekidan Rhythmic	
2016	Mongol800	Ningen Kousaten 2016	
2016	Rina Matsuno	rinanan RADIO SHOW!!	
2016	Mongol800	Osaka Haziketemazare Festival 2016	
2016	Mongol800	Kishidan Expo 2016	
2016	Mongol800	Yamabito Music Festival 2016	
2016	Mongol800	Countdown Japan 16/17	
2017	Amatsuki	Changero Sonic 2017	
2017	Amatsuki	Even Hikikomoris Want to Have a Festival!	
2017	Mongol800	Satanic Carnival'17	
2017	Reni Takagi	Hi-sai! Reni-chan	
2017	Amatsuki	Countdown Japan 16/17	
2017	Mongol800	MONGOL800 ga COUNTDOWN "Happy 20th ANNIVERSARY"	
2018	Amatsuki	Yaritaihodai Hall Tour Winter 2017–2018	
2018	Humbert Humbert	PIT VIPER BLUES T-Jijis Spring Special Two-Man	
2018	Amatsuki	—	
2018	Amatsuki	Summer Party 2018	
2018	Amatsuki	Loveletter from Moon	
2018	Mongol800	WE ▼NAMIE HANABI SHOW Eve Festival	
2019	Strawberry Prince	Strawberry Memory vol.7	
2019	Chiisana Koi no Uta Band	Pre-release party for Chiisana Koi no Uta	
2019	Mongol800	Satanic Carnival'19	
2020	Amatsuki	10th Anniversary Live Final!!	
2020	Nagoya Guitar Girls Club	Guitar Job Special Live	
2021	Mongol800	MONGOL800 ga LIVE "etc.works 3 RELEASE PARTY!!	
2022	Mongol800	1Chance Festival 2022	
2023	Amatsuki	Henachoko Friends Festival	
2023	Amatsuki	Aso Rock Festival Fire 2023	
2024	Mongol800	1Chance Festival 2024	
2026	Mongol800	What a Wonderful World!! 26	
