= NexTone Award =

Japanese music awards

- Awarded for: Artist, songwriters, and music publishers who have generated the highest revenue in royalties during a fiscal year
- Country: Japan
- Presented by: NexTone
- First award: 2017
- Website: nex-tone.co.jp/copyright/award.html

The NexTone Award is a Japanese music awards established in 2017 by the copyright collective NexTone. The awards are given to artists, songwriters and composers whose songs generated the highest revenue in royalties during a fiscal year.

Only artists represented by NexTone are eligible for an award. Similar to the JASRAC Awards the three most successful songs in royalties are awarded Gold, Silver or Bronze Medals depending on the royalties amassed. Until 2023, next to the Gold, Silver and Bronze Medals, a Special Award was given. Since 2024, the most successful Japanese work overseas and the most-successful song on YouTube by views are awarded as well.

== Winners ==
=== Main awards ===
List of main winners
Year	Gold			Silver			Bronze			Ref.
Year	Song	Writer(s)	Artist	Song	Writer(s)	Artist	Song	Writer(s)	Artist	Ref.
2017	"Nagisa"	Masamune Kusano	Spitz	"J.S.B Dream"	STY	Sandaime J Soul Brothers	"Umi no Koe"	Makoto Shinohara; Masaru Shimabukuro	Kenta Kiritani	
2018	"Zenzenzense"	Yōjirō Noda	Radwimps	"Stargazer"	Masamune Kusano	Spitz	"Still Alive"	Tomoyasu Hotei; Yukinojo Mori	Tomoyasu Hotei	
2019	"In Two"	Kenichi Anraku; Sorano; Ryo Ito; Adam Kapit	Namie Amuro	"Chiisana Koi no Uta"	Mongol800	Mongol800	"Loser"	Kenshi Yonezu	Kenshi Yonezu	
2020	"Kanade"	Takuya Ōhashi; Shintarō Tokita	Sukima Switch	"Zenzenzense"	Yōjirō Noda	Radwimps	"Anata ni"	Mongol800	Mongol800	
2021	"Marigold"	Aimyon	Aimyon	"Paprika"	Keshi Yonezu	Foorin	"Machigai Sagashi"	Kenshi Yonezu	Masaki Suda	
2022	"Kōsui"	8s	Eito	"Usseewa"	Syudou	Ado	"Neko"	Aimyon	Dish//	
2023	"Usseewa"	Syudou	Ado	"Odo"	Deco*27; Giga; TeddyLoid	Ado	"Goodbye Sengen"	Chinozo	Chinozo	
2024	"New Genesis"	Yasutaka Nakata	Ado	"Habit"	Fukase; Nakajin	Sekai no Owari	"I'm Invincible"	Motoki Ohmori	Ado	
2025	"Kaijū no Hanauta"	Vaundy	Vaundy	"Hitorinbo Envy"	Koyori	Koyori	"Que Sera Sera"	Motoki Ohmori	Mrs. Green Apple	

=== Other awards ===
List of other winners
Year	Special	International	YouTube			Special Merit	Ref.
Year	Special	International	Song	Writer(s)	Artist	Special Merit	Ref.
2017	TYMS Project	—N/a	—N/a	—N/a	—N/a	—N/a	
2018	BanG Dream! Project; Your Name Project	—N/a	—N/a	—N/a	—N/a	—N/a	
2019	Mongol800	—N/a	—N/a	—N/a	—N/a	—N/a	
2020	Official Hige Dandism	—N/a	—N/a	—N/a	—N/a	—N/a	
2021	Eikichi Yazawa	—N/a	—N/a	—N/a	—N/a	—N/a	
2022	Hololive Production	—N/a	—N/a	—N/a	—N/a	—N/a	
2023	Vaundy	—N/a	—N/a	—N/a	—N/a	—N/a	
2024	Hoshimachi Suisei	Atlus Sound Team (Note: Consisting of Atsushi Kitajō and Ryōta Kozuka)	"Surges"	Orangestar	Orangestar featuring Kase and Loin	Ryūichi Sakamoto	
2025	BSMG	Suzume Project	"Hai Yorokonde"	Kocchi no Kento; GRP	Kocchi no Kento	—N/a	
