= Chiisana Koi no Uta (film) =

2019 Japanese film

- Movie poster
- Japanese: 小さな恋のうた
- Directed by: Kojiro Hashimoto
- Screenplay by: Kenya Hirata
- Based on: "Chiisana Koi no Uta" by Mongol800
- Produced by: Teru Morii; Masaki Koide
- Starring: Hayato Sano; Yuki Morinaga; Anna Yamada; Gordon Maeda; Jin Suzuki; Claire Tomiko; Mongol800
- Edited by: Mitsuo Nishio
- Music by: Yosuke Miyauchi
- Distributed by: Toei
- Release date: 24 May 2019 (Japan)
- Running time: 123 minutes
- Country: Japan
- Language: Japanese

Chiisana Koi no Uta (Japanese: 小さな恋のうた, Hepburn: Chiisana Koi no Uta; lit. 'A Little Love Song') is a 2019 Japanese musical coming-of-age film directed by Kojiro Hashimoto and starring Hayato Sano as Ryota Maeshiro. It is based on the 2001 song of the same name by Japanese punk rock band Mongol800. The film was released on 21 May 2019.

== Plot ==
In a small town in Okinawa where a US military base is located, a high school band is gaining popularity. The members try to convey their feelings to their friends, family, and loved ones, such as a girl of the same age who lives on a US military base just across the fence, through their band activities. With the ability to sing their own songs and drive the audience wild, the band is scouted by a label in Tokyo and decides to make their professional debut. However, just as they are about to celebrate, a tragedy occurs and the band loses track of their destination. Then, a demo tape of one song and a girl living on the US military base appear.

== Synopsis ==
Ryota Maeshiro (Hayato Sano), Shinji Fukumura (Gordon Maeda), Kotaro Ikehara (Yuki Morinaga), and Daiki Niizato (Jin Suzuki) are four boys who form a popular band at their high school near a US military base in Okinawa. Ryota, the vocalist and lyricist, and Shinji, the guitarist and composer, are best friends. Shinji is also close to Lisa (Claire Tomiko), an American girl living on the military base, often sharing his music with her through the fence between their homes. Ryota writes the lyrics to Chiisana Koi no Uta for Shinji and Lisa.

After causing a scene while playing Don't Worry Be Happy in the practice room at school, the band is banned from using the space. They head instead to a local live house, where the owner, Toshihiro Nema (Masanori Sera), introduces the band to a talent scout. The scout invites them to make their professional debut in Tokyo, which they enthusiastically accept. On their way home, however, Shinji is killed in a hit-and-run accident. The driver is suspected to be from the military base, leading to protests from the locals.

Shinji's younger sister, Mai Fukumura (Anna Yamada), finds a recording of a new song Shinji had written shortly before his death. She shows it to Ryota and Kotaro, who agree to finish the song and perform it at the school festival on Shinji's behalf. Daiki has joined another band, so Ryota takes over the bass while Mai plays Shinji's guitar in his place. They visit Lisa regularly and invite her to come see their performance at the school festival. Lisa accepts, but her parents do not want her to leave the base.

In the days leading up to the school festival, the band rehearses at the live house with support from Nema. A video of them playing at the live house circulates online, and the school principal removes them from the school festival program. With help from Nema and Daiki, the band instead sets up on the school rooftop, where they perform Chiisana Koi no Uta for an enthusiastic crowd below. Meanwhile, Lisa tries to get a ride off the base, but the car is immediately swarmed by protesters.

In the aftermath, the band is suspended from school. Lisa's parents decide to leave Okinawa early, and she gives the band a sayonara doll with a farewell message. The band finishes the lyrics for Shinji's song and name it Sayonara Doll. With help from Nema, they record a CD for Lisa and perform for her across the fence. In the closing scene, the band plays on stage at the live house as Shinji watches proudly from the crowd.

== Cast ==
- Hayato Sano as Ryota Maeshiro (真栄城亮多, Maeshiro Ryōta)
- Yuki Morinaga as Kotaro Ikehara (池原航太郎, Ikehara Kōtarō)
- Anna Yamada as Mai Fukumura (譜久村舞, Fukumura Mai)
- Gordon Maeda as Shinji Fukumura (譜久村慎司, Fukumura Shinji)
- Jin Suzuki as Daiki Niizato (新里大輝, Nīzato Daiki)
- Claire Tomiko as Lisa (リサ, Risa)

== Background ==
"Chiisana Koi no Uta" is a song by the Okinawan band Mongol800 from their second album Message. Since its release in 2001, the song has become very popular as a karaoke song in Japan. In the DAM ranking compiled by Daiichi Kosho Company, the song ranked first in the category of the most-sung songs by a male artist as well as ranking second for the most popular karaoke song on DAM Heisei Karaoke Ranking, behind "Hanabi" by Mr. Chicken. The song placed in top 30 for Oricon's Year End Karaoke charts for eight years straight.

== Production ==
On 19 May 2018, the first day of their "GO ON AS YOU ARE" tour, Mongol 800 announced that heir song "Chiisana Koi no Uta" would receive a film adaptation. The film started production later that month. Kenya Hirata, who worked on the film's screenplay, wrote a novel based on the song, which in turn served as the film's script. The novel was released on 15 March 2019. The film was directed by Kojiro Hashimoto, while Kenya Hirata was in charge of the script, produced by Teru Morii and Masaki Koide, and Mitsuo Nishio was in charge of the editing.

Miyauchi Yosuke, a support member of Mongol800, was in charge of arranging the music and songs for the film. He also taught the actors how to play their instruments.

== Release ==
Chiisana Koi no Uta premiered in Japanese cinemas on 24 May 2019. The film was distributed by Toei.
