= Tomiko Claire =

American actress and model (born 2000)

- Born: San Francisco, California, U.S.
- Other name: Tomi Claire
- Education: Sophia University
- Occupation: Actress · model
- Years active: 2017–present
- Agent: Free Wave
- Known for: Little Love Song (2019)
- Musical career
- Genres: J-pop
- Instrument: Vocals
- Label: Arumate (2017–2019)
- Formerly of: Wi-Fi-5 (2017–2019)
- Website: Official website

Japanese name
- Katakana: トミコクレア
Transcriptions
- Romanization: Tomiko Kurea
- Website: https://talent.f-w.co.jp/talent/347/

Tomiko Claire (Japanese: トミコ・クレア, Hepburn: Tomiko Kurea), or Tomi Claire (Japanese: トミ・クレア, Hepburn: Tomiko Kurea) is an American actress and model based in Japan. She is known for her role as Lisa Crewson in Little Love Song.

== Early life ==
Tomiko Claire was born in San Francisco.

Since Claire was 7, she had been acting, dancing, and singing at community theaters. When she was 13, Claire visited Japan for the first time with her mother, who encouraged her to explore her Japanese roots, which Claire had noted that the culture had been fading from her family. After the trip, Claire decided she did not want to return as a tourist, but either as an idol, model, or an actor. She moved to Japan when she was 17, after receiving a contractual opportunity to work and perform there. In her Miss iD profile, it was mentioned that she would resume homeschooling. During her time in Japan, she was also enrolled at Sophia University.

== Career ==
=== 2016–2019: Debut as an idol and actress ===
In 2016, Claire moved to Japan to pursue a career in the Japanese entertainment industry. In 2017, she auditioned at Miss iD, a talent-seeking project sponsored by Kodansha, as a contestant, in which her winning resulted in her debuting as an idol in the four-member group Wi-Fi-5. The group's activities were suspended and disbanded in 2019.

=== 2019–2025: Modeling career and more acting roles ===
In 2019, Claire made her film debut in a supporting role as Lisa Crewson in Little Love Song, an American girl living on a U.S. Army Base, with a demo tape of the main protagonists' band's songs, who falls in love with the protagonist.

In 2022, Claire starred in the New York-based version of reality show Falling In Love Like a Romantic Drama, and made an appearance in the first episode of the 2022 Japanese adaptation of Korean drama Itaewon Class, Roppongi Class.

In 2023, it was announced that Claire would be starring in the sequel of Tonde Saitama, as the princess of Wakayama.

=== 2026–present: Return to San Francisco ===
As of 2026, Claire goes by Tomi online and has moved back to San Francisco. She continues to post videos about her life online.

==== Other ventures ====
Claire has made various guest appearances and performances at Masanori Sera's KNOCK KNOCK live stages, appearing consecutively in 2021, 2022, and 2023.

== Filmography ==
=== Film ===
| Year | Title | Role | Notes | Ref(s) |
|---|---|---|---|---|
| 2019 | Little Love Song | Lisa Crewson | Native name: 小さな恋のうた (Chiisana Koi no Uta) | |
| 2023 | Tonde Saitama ~Biwako Yori Ai o Komete~ | Princess of Wakayama | Native name: 翔んで埼玉 ～琵琶湖より愛をこめて～ (Fly Me to the Saitama: From Biwa Lake with Love); Sequel to Fly Me to the Saitama | |

=== Television ===
| Year | Title | Role | Notes | Ref(s) |
|---|---|---|---|---|
| 2019 | おもてなし 即レス英会話 | Olivia | | |
| 2021 | 大西泰斗の英会話☆定番レシピ | Herself | | |
| 2021 | 100 Ideas to Save the World | Program host | | |
| 2021, 2022 | ABEMAヒルズ | Guest commentator | Appeared in December 2021 & January 2022 | |
| 2021–2022 | Japan in Motion | Corner Regular Reporter | | |
| 2022 | Falling in Love Like a Romantic Drama in New York | Herself | Reality show | |
| 2022 | Roppongi Class | (Uncredited) | Episode 1; Japanese adaptation of Itaewon Class | |
| 2023 | 英会話フィーリングリッシュ | Emily | As of April 2023. | |

=== Live ===
| Year | Title | Notes |
|---|---|---|
| 2021 | 世良公則「KNOCK KNOCK2021」(よみうり大手町ホール)ゲスト出演 | English: Masanori Sera "KNOCK KNOCK 2021" at Yomiuriotemachi Hall; Guest appearance |
| 2022 | 世良公則「KNOCK KNOCK2022 with 宇崎竜童」(よみうり大手町ホール)ゲスト出演 | English: Masanori Sera "KNOCK KNOCK 2022 (with Ryudo Uzaki)" at Yomiuriotemachi Hall; Guest appearance |
| 2023 | 世良公則「KNOCK KNOCK2023」ゲスト出演 | English: Masanori Sera "KNOCK KNOCK 2023"; Guest appearance |
