= Message (Mongol800 album) =

Album by Mongol800

Studio album by Mongol800
- Released: September 16, 2001
- Genre: Punk rock, indie, ska punk, J-pop
- Length: 67:45
- Label: High Wave, Tissue Freak Records
- Producer: Mongol 800

Mongol800 chronology
Go on As You Are (2000)	Message (2001)	百々: Momo (2004)

Message (stylized all caps) is the second album released on September 16, 2001 by the Okinawa band Mongol800 via High Wave and Tissue Freak Records.

At the beginning, the album received only regional attention. After the song Anata ni was used in an advertisement the album became a national success, selling approximately 3 million copies and reaching first place in the Japanese albums charts by Oricon.

The album received no promotion like single releases or media coverage. Message contains 14 tracks with a running time of 67 minutes and 45 seconds.

== Background and release ==
Message is the second album of the Okinawan band Mongol800 after making their debut in December 1999 with the album Go On As You Are.

The album was released on September 16, 2001.

== Track listing ==
All tracks are written by vocalist/bassist Kiyosaku Uezu. The music was composed by Uezu, guitarist Takashi Gima and drummer Satoshi Takazato.

Message track listing
No.	Title	Length
1.	"Anata ni" (あなたに)	3:16
2.	"Song for You"	3:31
3.	"Chiisana Koi no Uta" (小さな恋のうた)	3:43
4.	"Melody"	5:30
5.	"Tsuki Akari no Shita de" (月灯りの下で)	5:03
6.	"For Life"	3:51
7.	"Oyashirazu -Summer Again" (親知らず－Summer Again－)	3:39
8.	"HEY Mommy"	1:48
9.	"Marriage Blue"	4:29
10.	"Mujun no Ue ni Saku Hana" (矛盾の上に咲く花)	3:59
11.	"Ryūkyū Aika" (琉球愛歌)	5:39
12.	"Dear My Lovers"	5:37
13.	"Yume Kanau" (夢叶う)	4:46
14.	"Dandelion"	12:54 (Note: "Dandelion" ends after 7:48 minutes. At 8:49 the hidden track "Message" starts.)
Total length:		67:45

== Lyrical content ==
The lyrics of the songs featured on the album are mainly about war and peace. These lyrics were written like if the words could have come out of the mouths from Okinawian people. The song "Ryūkyū Aika" for example is about loving nature without using violence while in "Mujun no Ue ni Saku Hana" the lyrics metaphorically tells the listeners to overcome war through using words of kindness.

In an article published in the Japanese regional daily newspaper Ryūkyū Shimpō in January 2018 the writer stated that it was weird and creepy that the album had been released only a few days after the September 11 attacks.

== Commercial performance ==
When the album was released it only received regional attention. After the song あなたに (Anata ni) was used in a TV commercial the album became a national success through mouth propaganda. When the album was initially released it peaked seventh in the Oricon Albums charts before jumping to the top-spot in following year. Message became the first album released by an indie label to sell more than one million copies and peaking at no. 1 in the official music charts.

In the year-end charts of 2002, the album ranked at third place with more than 2.1 million copies sold. The following year, Message ranked at no. 56 selling 230.000 copies. In the meantime, the album sold more than 2.8 million copies in Japan.

== Chart performance ==
=== Weekly charts ===
Weekly chart performance for Message
Chart (2002)	Peak position
Japanese Albums (Oricon)	1

=== Year-end charts ===
2001 year-end chart performance for Message
Chart (2001)	Position
Japanese Albums (Oricon)	84

2002 year-end chart performance for Message
Chart (2002)	Position
Japanese Albums (Oricon)	3

2003 year-end chart performance for Message
Chart (2003)	Position
Japanese Albums (Oricon)	56

2025 year-end chart performance for Message
Chart (2025)	Position
Japanese Hot Albums (Billboard Japan)	83

== Chiisana Koi no Uta ==
"A Small Love Song" became popular and has seen various cover applications in multimedia. It is used as an insert song of Operation Love, and also for the soundtrack of Teasing Master Takagi-san. It has been used various anime, for example, a cover sung by Manaka Iwami acts as the ending of The Angel Next Door Spoils Me Rotten.

"Chiisana Koi no Uta" has become a very popular karaoke song in Japan. It has been covered by more than 60 artists.
