= Etc. Work =

Studio album by Mongol800
- Released: July 8, 2008
- Genre: Punk rock, indie, ska punk, J-pop
- Label: High Wave, Tissue Freak Records
- Producer: Mongol 800

Mongol800 chronology
Daniel (2006)	Etc. Work (2008)	Eight-hundreds (2009)

Etc. Works is the fifth album released in 2008 by the Okinawa band Mongol800. This album is the 10th Anniversary release. The tracks include various works with other Okinwan bands, and a few songs written and composed with just the band themselves.

== Track listing ==
1. ラッキー8 ｢Rakki-8｣
2. 大迷惑 ｢Daimeiwaku｣
3. Beautiful (BLACK BOTTOM BRASS BAND & Mongol 800)
4. 輪 (feat.キヨサク / 山嵐) ｢Wa｣
5. ナサキ (RYUKYUDISKO feat. Mongol 800) ｢Nasaki｣
6. Remember (RIP SLYME with Mongol 800)
7. ひとりじゃない (SOFFet with Mongol 800) ｢Hitori Janai｣
8. オーバーラップワルツ ｢Oobaa Rappu Warutsu｣
9. Party (Stinking Blue Beat feat. Mongol 800)
10. さよなら ｢Sayonara｣
11. 二十九の春 ｢29 No Haru｣
12. 百々 (Mongol 800 with 古謝 美佐子) ｢Momo｣
13. 安里屋ユンタク ｢Asadoya Yuntaku｣
