= NexTone =

Japanese copyright collective

NexTone Inc.
- NexTone

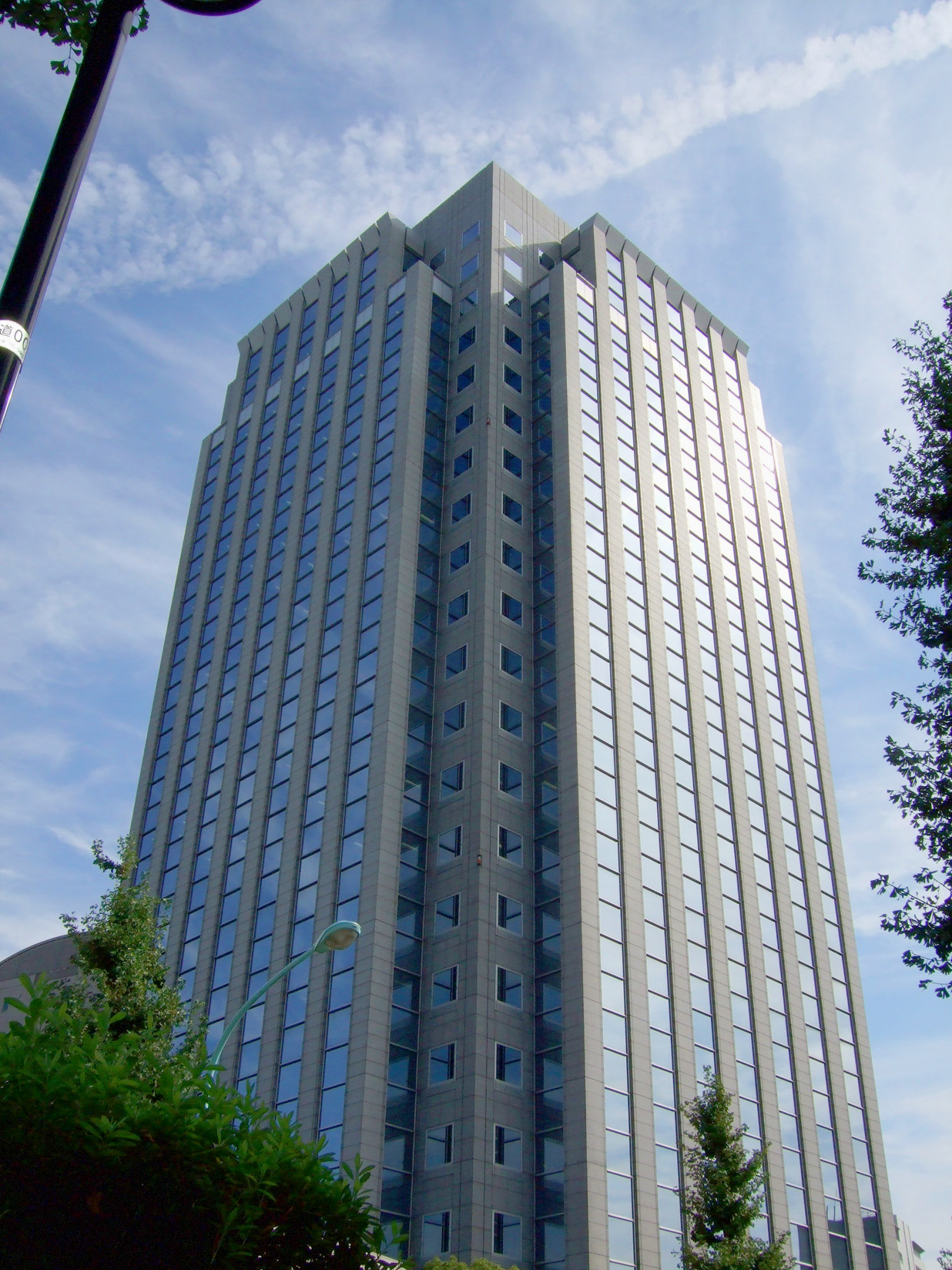
- Ebisu Prime Square Tower, where the headquarters is located
- Native name: 株式会社NexTone
- Type: Kabushiki gaisha
- Founded: September 2000
- Headquarters: Shibuya, Tokyo, Japan
- Owner: Amuse Inc. 7.57%, Faith, Inc. 7.57%
- Website: Official website

NexTone Inc. is a Japanese copyright collective that stands between copyright holders and users of music, not only managing music works and contents, but also promoting the use of music through digital content distribution and casting businesses, system development, and services for music publishers. It also promotes the use of music through digital content distribution and casting businesses, system development, and services for music publishers. Its headquarters is located in Hiroo, Shibuya, Tokyo, Japan. Major shareholders include Amuse Inc. and Faith, Inc.

With the enactment of the Act on Copyright, etc. Management Service in 2001, the company entered the music copyright management business, which had been monopolized by Japanese Society for Rights of Authors, Composers and Publishers (JASRAC).

== History ==
As of February 1, 2016, the company merged with Japan Rights Clearance Inc. and changed its name from e-License to NexTone Inc.

The company was listed on the Mothers section of the Tokyo Stock Exchange as of March 30, 2020. (Code: 7094)

On November 12, 2021, the company became YouTube's preferred distributor partner for digital content distribution operations.

On November 18, 2021, NexTone announced that it has signed a collection agency agreement with two French copyright collectives, the Society of Authors, Composers and Music Publishers (SACEM), the Society for the Administration of Mechanical Reproduction Rights (SDRM) and one US copyright collective, IMPEL Collective Management Limited (IMPEL), for the collection of copyright royalties for the use of NexTone-managed works outside Japan.

== Copyright management business ==
As a copyright management business, it receives consignments from copyright holders, such as composers and music publishers, and licenses their use and collects and distributes royalties.

== Digital contents distribution business ==
Aggregation of digital content, mainly music, for sale to domestic and international distributors.

== Casting and consulting business ==
The company also provides various casting services to meet the needs of general companies, advertising agencies, and other users, as well as copyright consulting services, education, and training services for all situations.

== Location ==
- Ebisu Prime Square Tower 20F, 1-1-39 Hiroo, Shibuya, Tokyo, Japan

== Group companies ==
- NexTone Systems inc.
- MCJP Inc.

== See also ==
- NexTone Award
