= Goodbye Sengen =

Japanese Vocaloid song

Single by Chinozo

from the album The Deluge
- Language: Japanese
- Released: April 13, 2020
- Genre: J-pop
- Length: 2:52
- Songwriter: Chinozo

Chinozo singles chronology
"Canary's Lament" (2020)	"Goodbye Sengen" (2020)	"Arisama" (2020)

Music video
- "Goodbye Sengen" on YouTube

- Goodbye Sengen

グッバイ宣言 (Gubbai Sengen)
- Genre: Coming-of-age, romantic comedy
- Light novel
- Written by: Midori Sangatsu
- Illustrated by: Chika Aruse
- Published by: Media Factory
- Imprint: MF Bunko J
- Original run: October 25, 2021 – present
- Volumes: 7
- Manga
- Written by: Midori Sangatsu
- Illustrated by: Iri Arata
- Published by: ASCII Media Works
- Imprint: Dengeki Comics NEXT
- Magazine: Dengeki Daioh
- Original run: July 27, 2022 – May 27, 2024
- Volumes: 3

"Goodbye Sengen" (グッバイ宣言, Gubbai Sengen; 'Goodbye Declaration') is a 2020 song written by Japanese music producer and singer Chinozo, utilizing the Vocaloid voice library V Flower. The song is the third-most viewed Vocaloid song on YouTube with more than 100 million views, and received over 3 billion listens on TikTok by 2022. A light novel adaptation was released on October 25, 2021, and sold over one hundred thousand copies by 2022.

== Background ==
Influenced by Japanese Vocaloid music producers Harumaki Gohan and MikitoP, Chinozo released his first Vocaloid song in 2018. Attracted by Japanese illustrator Chika Aruse's illustrations posted on Piapro, he decided to collaborate with Aruse to create a Vocaloid music video. In an interview, Chinozo said the situation was "becoming dark" due to the spread of the COVID-19, so he wanted to make some upbeat music.

== Music and lyrics ==
"Goodbye Sengen" is a fast-paced rock song with a tempo of 170 beats per minute. Its vocal range spans from the low note of C4 to the high note of C6. The pre-chorus features a repeating hook, "lu-lu-lu". The lyrics make reference to hikikomori, and the lyrics also express the pain of loneliness. In a trending topic on Twitter in 2021, participating tweets interpreted some lyrics of the song as "yandere" and "scary".

== Music video ==
The illustration of the music video for "Goodbye Sengen" was drawn by Japanese illustrator Chika Aruse, featuring a signature gesture which Chinozo and Aruseee designed together. The gesture shows the right hand touching the index finger with the thumb, rotating behind the head, with the left hand making the V sign towards the right hand. Japanese singer Sou hailed the illustration as "kawaii, fashionable, and coolness coexisting".

== Reception ==
Many singers, YouTubers, and VTubers have uploaded cover versions of the song. A derivative finger dance was popular on TikTok. Chinozo also released his own cover version on July 31, 2020. By October 2022, the music video had received 760,000 views and over 3 billion listens on TikTok, and was used as background music in 310 thousand videos, including many dance cover videos.

In August 2021, its view count surpassed the music video for "DUNE" by Kenshi Yonezu, becoming the most viewed Vocaloid song on YouTube. On July 26, 2022, the song reached 100 million views on YouTube, unprecedented for Vocaloid songs.

On April 28, 2023, the song won a bronze medal at the NexTone Award 2023. In May, the song was nominated for three categories of Independent Artist Awards by TuneCore Japan: Top Streaming Music of the Decade, Top UGC Music 2022, and Best Music Video 2022.

In 2024, McDonald's Japan collaborates with Goodbye Sengen to promote its new evolution Cheese Bacon Potato Pie.

== Chart performance ==
On March 4, 2021, "Goodbye Sengen" reached fourth place on Spotify's "Viral 50 - Japan" chart. The song ranked at number two on the Billboard Japan Top User Generated Songs chart on March 17, and topped the Billboard Japan Heatseekers Songs chart for two consecutive weeks. The song also topped the TikTok Hot Song Weekly Ranking chart five times.

The song topped the TikTok Hot Song Weekly Ranking chart in the first half of 2021, and ranked fourth in Top User Generated Songs chart for year-end 2021. It also topped the annual music chart "TikTok Trends 2021" released by TikTok at the end of 2021 with 3.25 billion views.

== Charts ==
=== Weekly charts ===
Weekly chart performance for "Goodbye Sengen"
Chart	Peak position
Billboard Japan Hot 100	53
Billboard Japan Heatseekers Songs	1
Billboard Japan Streaming Songs	46
Billboard Japan Download Songs	43
Billboard Japan Top User Generated Songs	2
Billboard Japan TikTok HOT SONGS	1
Billboard Japan Niconico Vocaloid Songs Top 20	8
Apple Music Top 100 Japan	88
Apple Music Anime Top Songs	1
Apple Music Anime Top Videos	2
Apple Music All Categories Top Videos	36
iTunes Store Anime Top Songs	1
iTunes Store All Categories TOP SONGS	4
iTunes Store Anime TOP MUSIC VIDEOS	1
iTunes Store All Categories TOP MUSIC VIDEOS	9
LINE MUSIC Vocaloid Top 50	12
LINE MUSIC Song Top 100	15
LINE MUSIC Japanese Music Top 50	21
LINE MUSIC MV Top 100	1
Deezer Country top charts	6
Oricon Streaming Chart	48
Oricon YouTube Chart Top 10	8

=== Year-end charts ===
2021 year-end chart performance for "Goodbye Sengen"
Chart	Position
Billboard Japan Hot 100	99
Billboard Japan Streaming Songs	96
Billboard Japan Top User Generated Songs	4
TikTok Trends 2021	1

2022 year-end chart performance for "Goodbye Sengen"
Chart	Position
Billboard Japan Top User Generated Songs	6

2023 year-end chart performance for "Goodbye Sengen"
Chart	Position
Billboard Japan Top User Generated Songs	17
Billboard Japan Niconico Vocaloid Songs Top 20	17

== Release history ==
Release dates for "Goodbye Sengen"
Region	Date	Format
World	April 13, 2020	Digital download; streaming

== Other media ==
=== Light novel ===
A light novel adaptation was written by Midori Sangatsu, illustrated by Chika Aruse, and supervised by Chinozo. It began publication on October 25, 2021 by Media Factory under their MF Bunko J imprint. The novel series mainly tells the story of high school students Kiritani Kakeru and Nanase Rena. The sequel volume "Shamer" was released in April 2022 and tells the story of "Goodbye Sengen" four years later. The third volume "Elite" was written from the perspective of Saki Ayase, a model student in class.

In the first week of its release, the novel ranked 5th on the Oricon Light Novel Weekly Chart with a sales volume of 7,424 copies, and kept this ranking with a sales volume of 6,977 copies in the next week. It reached third place on the Japanese Rakuten BOOKS Light Novel Weekly Chart, ranking ninth in the bunkobon category of the "Next Light Novel Award 2022" held by Kadokawa's "Kimirano". It also ranked in the top 20 of Tsutaya's monthly light novel sales chart for 7 consecutive months. By June 2022, it sold over one hundred thousand copies.

No.	Title	Release date	ISBN
1	Goodbye Sengen (グッバイ宣言)	October 25, 2021	978-4-04-680840-0
2	Shamer (シェーマ)	April 25, 2022	978-4-04-681363-3
3	Elite (エリート)	October 25, 2022	978-4-04-681830-0
4	TAMAYA	April 25, 2023	978-4-04-682401-1
5	Shotgun Nauru (ショットガン・ナウル)	October 25, 2023	978-4-04-682989-4
6	Cheese (チーズ)	April 25, 2024	978-4-04-683543-7
7	Myiha (ミィハー)	January 24, 2025	978-4-04-684211-4

=== Manga ===
A manga adaptation was announced in December 2021. Illustrated by Iri Arata, it was serialized in ASCII Media Works' Dengeki Daioh magazine from July 27, 2022, to May 27, 2024. Its chapters were collected in three tankōbon volumes.

No.	Release date	ISBN
1	January 27, 2023	978-4-04-914838-1
2	September 26, 2023	978-4-04-915260-9
3	June 26, 2024	978-4-04-915753-6

=== Audio drama ===
An audio drama adaptation by Kiki Anime under STUDIO koemee started airing in August 2022. It stars Minori Suzuki as Nanase Rena and Setsuo Itō as Kiritani Kakeru.
