= Chinozo =

Japanese Vocaloid producer

- Origin: Japan
- Genre: J-pop・Vocaloid
- Occupation: Vocaloid producer・singer-songwriter
- Years active: 2018–present

Chinozo (ちのぞー) is a Japanese Vocaloid producer and singer-songwriter. He is best known for his songs "Goodbye Sengen", "Shamer", and "Elite".

== Career ==
Chinozo is originally from the Kansai region of Japan and began playing guitar at the age of 15.

He made his debut as a Vocaloid producer on October 4, 2018, with the song "Ginga Shoujo" uploaded to Niconico. His earliest known song, "Natsunaru Sekai", was uploaded in August 2018 but has since been deleted. The oldest remaining upload is his third work, "Ginga Shoujo". He began uploading to YouTube on March 15, 2019.

On April 13, 2020, he released the music video for "Goodbye Sengen", which was digitally released on April 24. The song went viral on TikTok in early 2021 and significantly expanded his popularity. It topped the Billboard Japan Heatseekers Songs chart dated June 2, 2021.

On June 5, 2021, he joined the music unit niKu alongside "Kanade" and "Gacha", formed through fan voting in the project "NEO INTERNET MUSIC" (N.I.M).

On April 20, 2021, Chinozo launched the YouTube gaming commentary channel "Havoc Channel" with fellow producers "Chiitana" and "Kesumaru".

On August 12, 2021, "Goodbye Sengen" became the most-viewed Vocaloid song on YouTube. On July 27, 2022, it surpassed 100 million views, becoming the first Vocaloid song to do so. As of 2025, it has over 140 million views.

On March 5, 2025, Chinozo formed a new unit called Uchuu Pilot ("Space Pilot") with singer Yoru. That same day, they released the music videos for "Raze Me" and "Muchuu" on YouTube.

On June 21, 2025, he announced via X that a pop-up shop featuring "Chinokko", a recurring character from his music videos, would be held at Laforet Harajuku in Tokyo from August 14 to 20.
