= The Angel Next Door Spoils Me Rotten =

Japanese light novel series

- First light novel volume cover, featuring Mahiru Shiina

お隣の天使様にいつの間にか駄目人間にされていた件 (Otonari no Tenshi-sama ni Itsu no Ma ni ka Dame Ningen ni Sareteita Ken)
- Genre: Comedy drama; Romantic comedy; Slice of life
- Novel series
- Written by: Saekisan
- Published by: Shōsetsuka ni Narō
- Original run: December 20, 2018 – present
- Light novel
- Written by: Saekisan
- Illustrated by: Hazano Kazutake (vol. 1); Hanekoto (vol. 2 onwards)
- Published by: SB Creative
- English publisher: NA: Yen Press
- Imprint: GA Bunko
- Original run: June 15, 2019 – present
- Volumes: 13 + 4 short stories
- Manga
- Written by: Saekisan; Suzu Yūki (composition)
- Illustrated by: Wan Shibata
- Published by: Square Enix
- English publisher: NA: Square Enix Manga & Books
- Magazine: Manga Up!
- Original run: January 6, 2022 – present
- Volumes: 7
- Anime television series
- Directed by: Lihua Wang (S1); Chihiro Kumano (S2)
- Written by: Keiichirō Ōchi
- Music by: Moe Hyūga
- Studio: Project No.9
- Licensed by: Crunchyroll (streaming); SA/SEA: Medialink
- Original network: Tokyo MX, BS NTV, AT-X
- Original run: January 7, 2023 – June 19, 2026
- Episodes: 24
- Manga

The Angel Next Door Spoils Me Rotten: After the Rain
- Written by: Saekisan
- Illustrated by: Puyo
- Published by: Square Enix
- Magazine: Manga Up!
- Original run: December 7, 2023 – present
- Volumes: 3
- icon

The Angel Next Door Spoils Me Rotten (Note: Japanese: お隣の天使様にいつの間にか駄目人間にされていた件, Hepburn: Otonari no Tenshi-sama ni Itsu no Ma ni ka Dame Ningen ni Sareteita Ken; lit. 'The Case of the Neighborhood Angel Turning Me Into a Degenerate Unaware') is a Japanese light novel series written by Saekisan and illustrated by Hanekoto. Originally published online on Shōsetsuka ni Narō, SB Creative has released 13 volumes of the series under their GA Bunko label since June 2019. Yen Press holds the license to publish the series in North America in English. A manga adaptation with art by Wan Shibata and composition by Suzu Yūki has been serialized via Square Enix's online manga magazine Manga Up! since January 2022. As of June 2026, its chapters have been collected in seven tankōbon volumes. An anime television series adaptation produced by Project No.9 aired from January to March 2023. A second season aired from April to June 2026.

== Plot ==
Amane Fujimiya, a lonely and stoic high school boy, lives alone in an apartment, and the most beautiful girl in school, Mahiru Shiina, lives just next door, to which they are initially unaware of. They have almost never spoken despite being in the same class—until the day he sees her in distress on a rainy day and lends her his umbrella. To return the favor, she offers him help around the house, and before they realize, a relationship slowly begins to blossom as the distance between them closes.

== Characters ==
Amane Fujimiya (藤宮 周, Fujimiya Amane)
Voiced by: Taito Ban (Japanese); Ryan Negrón (English)
The male protagonist of the series, an awkward and lonely high school boy who lives alone in a small apartment. Because he is not good at organizing things, he often eats out or buys food from convenience stores. He starts to fall in love with Mahiru as he spends time with her, but constantly reminds himself not to as they are not dating, and out of fear of her rejecting him. By the end of the first season, he finally confesses his love to Mahiru and they begin dating.
Mahiru Shiina (椎名 真昼, Shiina Mahiru)
Voiced by: Manaka Iwami (Japanese); Jill Harris (English)
The main female protagonist, a gorgeous and kind young girl who lives alone in the small apartment next door to Amane. She is idolized at school because of her beauty as well as her academic and athletic abilities, and is given the nickname of Angel. She comes from a rich family, but she lives away from her parents as they are not on good terms. Though initially showing no feelings or affection for Amane, she starts to warm up to him as they bond, and realizes she might be falling for him as well. Amane's mother develops a fondness for her and appreciates her care for him. By the end of the first season, Mahiru returns Amane's feelings and becomes his girlfriend.
Her name, Mahiru (lit. 'noon'), which was given by her father, Asahi (lit. 'morning sun'), represents the noon in between morning and night, which is the name of her mother, Sayo (lit. 'little night').
Itsuki Akasawa (赤澤 樹, Akasawa Itsuki)
Voiced by: Taku Yashiro (Japanese); Matthew Elkins (English)
Amane's friend and classmate. He gives advice to Amane regarding his relationship with Mahiru. He is Chitose's boyfriend, having had feelings for her from junior high school, and plans to marry her in the future. He calls her "Chii" (ちぃ).
Chitose Shirakawa (白河 千歳, Shirakawa Chitose)
Voiced by: Haruka Shiraishi (Japanese); Skyler McIntosh (English)
Amane's classmate and Itsuki's girlfriend, who befriends Mahiru.
Yūta Kadowaki (門脇 優太, Kadowaki Yūta)
Voiced by: Kensho Ono (Japanese); Ethan Marshall (English)
Amane and Mahiru's classmate who is the ace of the school's track-and-field team. He is popular with girls and is nicknamed "Prince", though Mahiru finds him arrogant and annoying.
Ayaka Kido (木戸 彩香, Kido Ayaka)
Voiced by: Marika Kōno (Japanese); Madeleine Broseh (English)

== Media ==
=== Light novel ===
The light novel series originally began serialization online on the website Shōsetsuka ni Narō in December 2018. SB Creative then acquired the series and has published 13 volumes under their GA Bunko label since June 2019, while Yen Press holds the license for English release in North America. The English translation is done by Nicole Wilder.

The illustrator was changed from Hazano Kazutake to Hanekoto in Volume 2.

No.	Original release date	Original ISBN	English release date	English ISBN
1	June 15, 2019	978-4-8156-0248-2	December 15, 2020	978-1-9753-1923-6
Chapter 1: "Meeting an Angel"; Chapter 2: "A Cold–and Being Nursed by an Angel"; Chapter 3: "The Angel's Generosity"; Chapter 4: "A Chance Encounter"; Chapter 5: "The Angel and the Great Cleaning Campaign"; Chapter 6: "A Visit from a Friend"; Chapter 7: "The Angel's Injury and a Show of Gratitude"; Chapter 8: "The First Meal Together"; Chapter 9: "The Angel's Birthday"; Chapter 10: "Mother Invades"; Chapter 11: "A Reward for the Angel"; Chapter 12: "Cooking Classes with the Angel"; Chapter 13: "Christmas with Everyone"; Chapter 14: "Christmas for Two"; Special Bonus Short Story: "A Power Outage, Anxiety, and Warmth"
2	April 14, 2020	978-4-8156-0327-4	August 24, 2021	978-1-9753-2269-4
Chapter 1: "Spending the End of the Year with the Angel"; Chapter 2: "The Defenseless Angel and the Start of the New Year"; Chapter 3: "Visiting Parents and the First Shrine Visit of the Year"; Chapter 4: "A New Semester"; Chapter 5: "The Angel in Poor Health"; Chapter 6: "Valentine's Day"; Chapter 7: "White Day"; Chapter 8: "The Start of Spring Vacation"; Chapter 9: "An Incident and the Angel's Truth"; Chapter 10: "The Angel's Metamorphosis"; Bonus Chapter: "You Are Not Alone"
3	September 11, 2020	978-4-8156-0741-8	December 7, 2021	978-1-9753-3340-9
Chapter 1: "The Start of the New Semester"; Chapter 2: "Contact with the Prince"; Chapter 3: "The Angel and an Unwanted Imposition"; Chapter 4: "The Angel's Decision"; Chapter 5: "Contact with the Angel and the Reaction from Others"; Chapter 6: "The Angel in Cooking Class"; Chapter 7: "The Angel's Proposal"; Chapter 8: "Fooling Around in the Angel's Cooking Classroom"; Chapter 9: "An Outing with the Angel"; Chapter 10: "An Interrogation"; Chapter 11: "None but You"; Chapter 12: "Parental Concern and a Passing Pain"; Chapter 13: "A Premonition of Trouble After the Holidays"
4	March 12, 2021	978-4-8156-0827-9; 978-4-8156-0826-2 (SE)	October 25, 2022	978-1-9753-4440-5
Chapter 1: "The Angel's Thoughts"; Chapter 2: "The Angel's Risky Proposal"; Chapter 3: "The Angel in the Dream, Feelings of Shame"; Chapter 4: "Studying with the Angel"; Chapter 5: "Studying with Everyone"; Chapter 6: "Before the Test, a Moment"; Chapter 7: "After the Test, a Moment"; Chapter 8: "A Reward from the Angel"; Chapter 9: "The Angel's New Clothes"; Chapter 10: "The Angel's Gaze and Amane's Struggle"; Chapter 11: "The Angel Drops a Bomb"; Chapter 12: "Pretending Not to See, Pretending Not to Know"; Chapter 13: "Sports Day Preparations and New Friends"; Chapter 14: "Saying Goodbye to My Cowardly Self"
5	July 14, 2021	978-4-8156-1169-9	February 21, 2023	978-1-9753-4827-4
Chapter 1: "The Day After the Confession"; Chapter 2: "Going to School Together and Making a Debut"; Chapter 3: "Interrogation Over Lunch"; Chapter 4: "Change of Circumstance, Change of Attitude"; Chapter 5: "Something that Can't Be Concealed"; Chapter 6: "What Changed After Starting to Date"; Chapter 7: "Nothing Too Sexy"; Chapter 8: "Don't Feed the Animals"; Chapter 9: "The Start of Summer Vacation"; Chapter 10: "If Anything, You're Cute"; Chapter 11: "Poolside Playboys Are Expected"; Chapter 12: "Homecoming, and Revealing the Relationship"; Chapter 13: "Always by Your Side"; Chapter 14: "A Chance Meeting with the Past"; Chapter 15: "Farewell to the Past"
5.5	January 14, 2022	978-4-8156-1199-6; 978-4-8156-1291-7 (SE)	September 26, 2023	978-1-9753-7256-9
Chapter 1: "What's Wrong with Liking What You Like?"; Chapter 2: "Daily Routine and Meals Worth Remembering"; Chapter 3: "Good Traits That Nobody Else Knows About"; Chapter 4: "Another Major Cleaning Operation, and Trouble"; Chapter 5: "Who's Spoiling Whom?"; Chapter 6: "Childhood Anxieties, and Reassurance in the Present"; Chapter 7: "A Careless Angel"; Chapter 8: "Only Bad Kids Stay Up All Night"; Chapter 9: "A Secret Decision, and Sentimentality"; Chapter 10: "How We Spend Time Together"; Chapter 11: "An Early Afternoon Nap, and Mahiru's Curiosity"; Chapter 12: "Watching Over Your Friends' Romance Is Also Difficult"; Chapter 13: "Even the Angel Is Bad at Some Things"; Chapter 14: "A Sleepover and a Story from the Past"; Chapter 15: "Former Regrets and Hopes for the Future"; Chapter 16: "That Voice Is Against the Rules"
6	May 16, 2022	978-4-8156-1200-9; 978-4-8156-1344-0 (SE)	January 30, 2024	978-1-9753-7259-0
Chapter 1: "The Angel's Awakening"; Chapter 2: "Getting Drenched has its Benefits"; Chapter 3: "The Shape of Longing"; Chapter 4: "A Home Date with the Angel"; Chapter 5: "Another Farewell"; Chapter 6: "The Angel and a Suspicious Individual"; Chapter 7: "Summer Festival with the Angel"; Chapter 8: "Assignments Come First"; Chapter 9: "A Once Desired Encounter, and Resulting Determination"; Afterword
7	September 14, 2022	978-4-8156-1201-6; 978-4-8156-1530-7 (SE)	June 18, 2024	978-1-9753-7974-2
Chapter 1: "The Angel and the New Semester"; Chapter 2: "Faltering Before the Angel's Acting"; Chapter 3: "The Angel's Begging"; Chapter 4: "Before the Festival: A Premonition of Turmoil"; Chapter 5: "Knowing When to Back Down Is Key"; Chapter 6: "Who Are You Smiling For?"; Chapter 7: "Who We Want to Invite"; Chapter 8: "Before the Festival: A Final Act of Preparation"; Chapter 9: "Cultural Festival: The Opening Act"; Chapter 10: "The Angel and the Cultural Festival Tour"; Chapter 11: "Cultural Festival: The Second Day"; Chapter 12: "The Bonds Blessed Upon the Angel"; Chapter 13: "The End of the Festival and the After-Party"; Chapter 14: "The Angel's Request"; Afterword
8	January 14, 2023	978-4-8156-1596-3	December 10, 2024	978-1-9753-7976-6
Chapter 1: "An Important Promise with the Angel"; Chapter 2: "A Strong Determination to Cherish"; Chapter 3: "First Steps Towards the Goal!"; Chapter 4: "New Interactions"; Chapter 5: "Lunch for Three"; Chapter 6: "Pressure from a Friend"; Chapter 7: "His First Part-Time Job"; Chapter 8: "A Senpai's Secret Worry"; Chapter 9: "The Angel's Secret 'Business'"; Chapter 10: "And So, 'X' Day Arrived for the Angel"; Afterword
8.5	September 15, 2023	978-4-8156-2176-6	May 20, 2025	979-8-8554-0886-7
Chapter 1: "The Path We've Walked Thus Far"; Chapter 2: "Someone Similar but Different"; Chapter 3: "Rome Wasn't Built in a Day"; Chapter 4: "Fleeting Dreams and Cruelties of Youth"; Chapter 5: "Cute Kids"; Chapter 6: "Unwanted Contact"; Chapter 7: "The More You Polish It, the More It Shines"; Chapter 8: "From the Outside They Seem..."; Chapter 9: "Say The Name You'll Call Me Someday"; Chapter 10: "A Secret Just for Two"; Chapter 11: "Someone Who Looks Carefully"; Chapter 12: "The Future We're Walking Into"; Afterword
9	March 15, 2024	978-4-8156-2399-9; 978-4-8156-2398-2 (SE); 978-4-8156-2475-0 (SE)	January 6, 2026	979-8-8554-0888-1
Chapter 1: "When I Woke Up, Right There Before My Eyes Was..."; Chapter 2: "Preparations for a Celebration"; Chapter 3: "Imminent Meetings and Each Person's Distress"; Chapter 4: "A Distant Memory"; Chapter 5: "A Long Way to Go"; Chapter 6: "Asking for Advice from Seniors"; Chapter 7: "An Important Preparatory Period"; Chapter 8: "And Then the Important Day Arrived"; Bonus Story: "Behind the Scenes of the Happiest Day in the World"; Afterword
10	September 14, 2024	978-4-8156-2664-8; 978-4-8156-2701-0 (SE)	August 11, 2026	979-8-8554-2599-4
11	March 15, 2025	978-4-8156-2805-5; 978-4-8156-2909-0 (SE); 978-4-8156-2910-6 (SE)	—	—
11.5	September 13, 2025	978-4-8156-3599-2; 978-4-8156-3598-5 (SE)	—	—
12	March 14, 2026	978-4-8156-3757-6; 978-4-8156-4011-8 (SE); 978-4-8156-4012-5 (SE)	—	—
13	September 12, 2026	978-4-8156-4210-5; 978-4-8156-4460-4 (SE)	—	—
Mahiru Shiina's Side	November 14, 2026	978-4-8156-4210-5	—	—
14	March 13, 2027	978-4-8156-4550-2; 978-4-8156-4549-6 (SE)	—	—

=== Manga ===
A manga adaptation, which was announced on November 18, 2019, with art by Wan Shibata and composition by Suzu Yūki began serialization in Square Enix's online manga magazine Manga Up! on January 6, 2022. As of June 5, 2026, its chapters have been collected in seven tankōbon volumes.

At Anime Expo 2023, Square Enix Manga & Books announced that they licensed the series for English publication. The first volume released on February 6, 2024.

No.	Original release date	Original ISBN	English release date	English ISBN
1	July 7, 2022	978-4-7575-8016-9	February 6, 2024	978-1-64609-270-3
Chapters 1–4; Bonus Short Story
2	December 7, 2022	978-4-7575-8296-5	July 2, 2024	978-1-64609-271-0
Chapters 5–9; Bonus Short Story
3	December 7, 2023	978-4-7575-8948-3	January 21, 2025	978-1-64609-323-6
Chapters 10–13; Bonus Short Story
4	August 6, 2024	978-4-7575-9342-8	October 7, 2025	978-1-64609-421-9
Chapters 14–17; Bonus Short Story
5	March 7, 2025	978-4-7575-9644-3; 978-4-7575-9645-0 (SE)	November 10, 2026	978-1-64609-455-4
Chapters 18–21; Bonus Short Story
6	October 7, 2025	978-4-301-00102-7	—	—
Chapters 22–25; Bonus Short Story
7	June 5, 2026	978-4-301-00566-7	—	—
Chapters 26-29; Bonus Short Story

A spin-off manga series illustrated by Puyo, titled The Angel Next Door Spoils Me Rotten: After the Rain (お隣の天使様にいつの間にか駄目人間にされていた件 after the rain, Otonari no Tenshi-sama ni Itsu no Ma ni ka Dame Ningen ni Sareteita Ken after the rain), began serialization in the Manga Up! service on December 7, 2023. The series adapts the first short story volume of the light novels (Volume 5.5).

No.	Original release date	Original ISBN	English release date	English ISBN
1	August 6, 2024	978-4-7575-9343-5	—	—
Chapters 1–13; Bonus Short Story
2	April 7, 2025	978-4-7575-9781-5	—	—
Chapters 14–25; Bonus Short Story
3	June 5, 2026	978-4-301-00567-4	—	—
Chapters 26-39; Bonus Short Story

=== Anime ===
An anime television series adaptation was announced on January 4, 2022. It is produced by Project No.9 and directed by Lihua Wang, with supervision by Kenichi Imaizumi, scripts written by Keiichirō Ōchi, character designs by Takayuki Noguchi, and music composed by Moe Hyūga. The series aired from January 7 to March 25, 2023, on Tokyo MX and other networks. The opening theme song is "Gift" (ギフト, Gifuto) performed by Masayoshi Ōishi, and the ending theme song (for the most part) is a cover of Mongol800's "Chiisana Koi no Uta" (小さな恋のうた) performed by Manaka Iwami. But in episode 1, episode 7 and episode 12, the ending theme songs are respectively the opening theme song "Gift" (ギフト, Gifuto), a cover of Greeeen's "Ai Uta" (愛唄; lit. 'Love Song') performed by Manaka Iwami and a cover of Flumpool's "To You" (君に届け, Kimi ni Todoke) performed by Manaka Iwami. Crunchyroll streamed the series.

A second season was announced during an event for the anime series on October 8, 2023. The staff and cast from the first season are reprising their roles, with Chihiro Kumano replacing Wang as director. The season aired from April 3 to June 19, 2026. The opening theme song is "You are a Lover" (君は恋人, Kimi wa Koibito) performed by Masayoshi Ōishi. The ending theme is a cover of Dreams Come True's "Ureshii! Tanoshii! Daisuki!" performed by Manaka Iwami. The second season is set to run for 12 episodes.

==== Season 1 (2023) ====
No.	Title	Directed by (Note: Information is taken from the ending credits of each episode.)	Written by	Storyboarded by	Original release date
1	"Meet the Angel"; Transliteration: "Tenshi-sama to no Deai" (Japanese: 天使様との出会い)	Kanji Wakabayashi	Keiichirō Ōchi	Kenichi Imaizumi	January 7, 2023
One rainy day, Amane sees his beautiful and popular classmate Mahiru sitting on a swing and offers her his umbrella. Thus, Amane caught a cold from the rain the next day but went to school anyways. When Amane returns to his apartment where he lives alone and finds Mahiru with his umbrella as she actually lives alone in the apartment next to his. As his cold has become worse, she supports him inside his messy apartment and cooks porridge for him. After getting better, Amane learns that Mahiru is an excellent cook and hates the nickname Angel that everyone calls her at school. They both agree to act as strangers at school but the next day Mahiru realized Amane lives on take-out food and energy drinks so she offers to make dinner. This soon becomes a routine of cooking for him every night. Amane's friend Itsuki actually notices Amane looking healthier from his improved diet. Mahiru finds Amane actually trying to clean his apartment and decides to help, after which Amane buys pizza. Mahiru reveals she has never had pizza as her parents are rich enough to employ a chef, leaving Amane confused why she struggles living alone on a budget. He asks why she is bothering to cook for him and she insists it is the satisfaction of showing off her skills, but Amane is unconvinced.
2	"Dinner with the Angel"; Transliteration: "Tenshi-sama to Yūshoku" (Japanese: 天使様と夕食)	Tomio Yamauchi	Keiichirō Ōchi	Kenichi Imaizumi	January 14, 2023
After finding Mahiru with a sprained ankle, Amane carries her home dressed in his PE clothes in case she is recognized by others. Amane casually mentions wanting to try Mahiru's cooking while fresh and hot, so Mahiru agrees to cook in Amane's kitchen, while splitting the cost of ingredients and eating together. They realize they enjoy eating together but Amane still finds the arrangement unusual since they are neither dating nor even interested in each other. While studying, Amane works hard enough to get good grades but Mahiru claims she is required to get top grades but does not explain why. Amane unconditionally glances from her ID and notices that Mahiru's birthday is soon so he asks his friend Itsuki and his girlfriend Chitose for gift ideas. Despite Mahiru's claim she never celebrates her birthday she accepts the gift of hand cream and a teddy bear which make her very happy. She also reveals she usually keeps her birthday a secret, so accepting Amane's gift is a big deal. Amane realizes he is falling in love with Mahiru and wonders if this is what having a girlfriend feels like but quickly reminds himself they are not dating.
3	"Reward for the Angel"; Transliteration: "Tenshi-sama e no Gohōbi" (Japanese: 天使様へのご褒美)	Michita Shiraishi	Keiichirō Ōchi	Kenichi Imaizumi	January 21, 2023
Amane's mother Shihoko visits unexpectedly and, finding Mahiru asleep in his room, believes they are either dating or almost dating. After she leaves, Mahiru is glad Amane has a kind mother, revealing her own parents never even bothered to call her by her first name. They decide they can use each other's first names, but only in private. Mahiru is surprised when Amane gives her a spare key. When Mahiru gets first place in their exams, Amane buys a cake as a reward, something else she never got from her parents. They end up feeding each other bites of cake but soon realize that it is embarrassing. Amane decides to attempt to cook for himself but it does not go well. Mahiru is pleased he still needs her to cook for him. Itsuki and Chitose convince Amane to invite them to his apartment for a Christmas Eve party. Mahiru chooses to hide in her own apartment until they leave but asks Amane to spend Christmas Day teaching her to play video games. When it begins snowing at the party Chitose and Itsuki watch it from the balcony and are surprised to see Mahiru doing the same on her own balcony next door, accidentally discovering that she is Amane's neighbor.
4	"The Angel in the Christmas"; Transliteration: "Kurisumasu no Tenshi-sama" (Japanese: クリスマスの天使様)	Hiroyuki Okuno	Keiichirō Ōchi	Kenichi Imaizumi	January 28, 2023
Amane and Mahiru explain their living situation. Itsuki and Chitose are skeptical about their claim of no romantic feelings but agree to keep everything secret. Amane is upset their secret did not last longer then confused over feeling that way. He and Mahiru share dinner like normal and she reveals she learned cooking from the woman who looked after her. As planned they play video games on Christmas day which leads to embarrassing moments as Amane teaches her to play. Amane reveals a Christmas gift, a cute case to keep his spare key in. Mahiru unexpectedly moves Amane's hair from his face and discovers he is actually quite handsome. Amane does the same to her and sees how beautiful she is. Panicking, Mahiru reveals Amane's gift; a scarf. Mahiru develops a fever so Amane puts her in his bed to rest. Mahiru unexpectedly holds Amane's hand until she falls asleep. Later, she reveals it was Koyuki, her parents' maid, who taught her cooking, but even Koyuki couldn't look after her when Mahiru was ill as she went home at night. Amane promises to stay every night until she gets better. Later, Amane is angry at himself for falling in love with her.
5	"First Shrine Visit (Hatsumode) with the Angel"; Transliteration: "Tenshi-sama to Hatsumōde" (Japanese: 天使様と初詣)	Tomio Yamauchi	Keiichirō Ōchi	Kenichi Imaizumi	February 4, 2023
Amane's parents arrange to visit him on New Year's Day. Mahiru falls asleep in Amane's arms before he can tell her, forcing him to put her in his bed while he takes the sofa. The next morning Mahiru is embarrassed. Amane's parents arrive and Mahiru meets his father, Shuto. They decide to visit a shrine, even though Amane is still afraid of people from school seeing them together. Talking with Shuto it is revealed Amane lives alone due to a past incident. Amane is stunned by Mahiru in traditional Yukata; Mahiru is likewise happy at how mature Amane looks in smart clothes and actually tells him so. Unfamiliar with the Yukata, Mahiru holds Amane's arm the whole visit to avoid falling. Amane's parents return home. A rumor spreads at school Mahiru visited a shrine with a secret boyfriend who no one realizes was Amane. Amane warns Mahiru that being seen with him is bad for her. Tired of his low opinion of himself Mahiru scolds him, angrily listing everything she likes about him. Amane is surprised Mahiru has such a good impression of him. Mortified and embarrassed by her outburst Mahiru spends the rest of their evening hiding her face in a pillow, though it only makes Amane's feelings for her grow even more.
6	"A Gift from the Angel"; Transliteration: "Tenshi-sama no Okurimono" (Japanese: 天使様の贈り物)	Michita Shiraishi	Keiichirō Ōchi	Kenichi Imaizumi; Takehiro Nakayama	February 11, 2023
Valentines Day approaches. Mahiru only gives chocolate to her female friends to avoid starting rumors. Amane notices classmate Yuta Kadowaki getting chocolates from dozens of girls and lends him a bag to carry it all. Mahiru makes chocolate for Amane but is embarrassed and leaves them in his apartment before quickly returning home. Amane finds they were handmade to his preference of bitter chocolate. Yuta thanks Amane for the bag, causing some gossip. Amane decides to get Mahiru a White Day gift, despite her insistence she does not need one. Mahiru is annoyed Amane's birthday was before Christmas and he did not tell her, so she demands they celebrate his next one but is embarrassed by the implication they will still be together in a year. Amane gives Mahiru a flower bracelet and an "anything you want" coupon which she uses immediately to have him put the bracelet on for her. Amane finds repressing his feelings becoming unbearable. Itsuki correctly deduces it is Amane's fear of rejection holding him back. After accidentally touching her hand Amane is physically floored when Mahiru reveals she hates boys touching her but does not mind if Amane does it. Amane worries Mahiru is acting like a newlywed wife.
7	"A Promise with the Angel"; Transliteration: "Tenshi-sama to no Yakusoku" (Japanese: 天使様との約束)	Akira Katō	Keiichirō Ōchi	Kenichi Imaizumi; Masayuki Takahashi	February 18, 2023
Itsuki fights with his father and stays with Amane temporarily. Mahiru cooks him dinner as well and Itsuki fails to get Amane to confess his feelings. Chitose invites herself over and Mahiru agrees she can sleep in her apartment. Chitose attempts to have Mahiru be honest with her feelings but fails. Itsuki eventually leaves but before they can return to normal Mahiru is visited by a woman who insults her and tells her she will not visit again once Mahiru graduates university. Mahiru admits to Amane the woman is Sayo, her mother who has hated her since birth. Her parents married for business reasons and Mahiru's birth was an accident. Due to this, raising her was entrusted to servants like Koyuki. Mahiru's existence prevents them from getting divorced until she graduates university, hence their hatred of her. The day Amane found her in the rain she was in near despair, until Amane showed her kindness. Amane allows Mahiru to cry on him, comforting and reassuring her until she feels better, followed by embarrassment at hugging for such a long time. They decide to go for a walk, confirming they are important to each other, briefly hugging and holding hands under cherry blossom trees.
8	"The Angel in the New Term"; Transliteration: "Shin Gakki no Tenshi-sama" (Japanese: 新学期の天使様)	Tomio Yamauchi	Keiichirō Ōchi	Kenichi Imaizumi	February 25, 2023
In the new term Amane and Mahiru are now in the same class. Yuta starts talking to Amane more. Mahiru, who smiles a lot more and enjoys casually touching Amane, makes the surprising request for him to put his head in her lap. Amane is confused but it does make him feel better and he falls asleep. Mahiru makes it clear Amane is the only one who gets to see this side of her. Amane wins more stuffed animals for Mahiru who asks if he would like anything in return. Amane picks pudding, though she seems dissatisfied by this choice, then becomes embarrassed when he insists her cooking is the highlight of his day. The next day Mahiru is unexpectedly jealous of Yuta being able to speak to Amane in public, so she begins casually interacting with Amane at school and ends up on a group cooking project with him, Itsuki and Chitose. Other students fooling around in the kitchen almost burn Mahiru but Amane saves her. Mahiru notices Amane holds her longer than necessary, earning jealous stares from a lot of people. Mahiru hopes Amane won't be bothered by other students and is visibly upset at how long it will take before she and Amane can interact casually in public.
9	"Going Out with the Angel"; Transliteration: "Tenshi-sama to Odekake" (Japanese: 天使様とお出かけ)	Hiroyuki Okuno	Keiichirō Ōchi	Kenichi Imaizumi	March 4, 2023
Amane and Mahiru will soon have a week off school so Mahiru asks to go out somewhere. Amane agrees and they plan to visit a cat café, an arcade and go shopping. Mahiru gives Chitose cooking lessons. Amane falls asleep while they cook and after Chitose leaves Mahiru confesses while he slept she had pinched his cheek. Getting ready for their day out Amane is pleasantly surprised Mahiru dresses up for it and styles her hair. Almost without realising they hold hands all day. At the cat café Amane comments Mahiru is cat-like, distant at first, then affectionate and likes to be petted. At the arcade Mahiru wins Amane a toy cat and he almost pets her hair, but they are approached by Yuta who quickly deduces what is going on. Amane makes another bad comment about himself, causing Mahiru to question what caused his low self-esteem. The next day Yuta asks probing questions that really make Amane think about his feelings for Mahiru. Returning home he catches Mahiru guiltily looking at his childhood photographs emailed to her by his mother. Wrestling for her phone Amane falls on top of her and almost kisses her, but he resists, pinching her cheek instead. When he cannot see her face, Mahiru appears disappointed.
10	"The Angel in the Dream"; Transliteration: "Yume no Naka no Tenshi-sama" (Japanese: 夢の中の天使様)	Hiromichi Matano	Keiichirō Ōchi	Kenichi Imaizumi	March 11, 2023
With Mothers Day approaching Mahiru questions why he won't even return home to see his mother. Amane finally explains; in Junior High he had three friends he realised were manipulating him for his money. He lost his ability to trust even his other friends and switched schools. Mahiru promises he can always depend on her when he's upset. A rumour spreads at school Mahiru went on a date with a guy, which Mahiru confirms was the most important person in her life. She later insists this is true to Amane; she has no feelings for her parents so all she has are friends, of which Amane is her most treasured. Feeling more determined, Amane begins to improve his appearance and starts exercising, in hopes of impressing Mahiru. Amane dreams of having sex with Mahiru, making him act strangely towards her. Mahiru is upset until Amane explains about his embarrassing dream, which Mahiru finds funny and playfully teases him about it. With exams approaching Mahiru promises Amane if he scores in the top ten he can lie with his head in her lap again. She also reveals she loves taking care of him. Her use of the word "love" is almost too much for Amane to handle.
11	"The Angel Next Door Spoils Me Rotten"; Transliteration: "Otonari no Tenshi-sama ni Itsu no Ma ni ka Dame Ningen ni Sareteita" (Japanese: お隣の天使様にいつの間にか駄目人間にされていた)	Yasubee Akasaka	Keiichirō Ōchi	Kenichi Imaizumi	March 18, 2023
Amane scores 6th in the exams. Amane insists she deserves a reward for scoring 1st but Mahiru refuses, claiming her wish is not something he can give her. She then insists on putting his head in her lap to stroke his hair. Mahiru falls asleep and Amane is forced to carry her to her own apartment. Half asleep she asks Amane to sleep in her bed with her, but he resists. The next morning Mahiru is mortified but also frustrated she has started to desire him physically but Amane deliberately misunderstands when she hints at it. As summer arrives Mahiru switches to summer uniform, taking care to show Amane her bare legs without tights, provoking him to admit he likes her legs while she admits she wanted him to see them. Amane is angry when he overhears girls gossiping about Mahiru but she accepts it is a normal reaction to her popular public personality. Amane insists he prefers the real her she shows in private, embarrassing her, but making her happy he knows the real her. She also finds it cute he is possessive of the real her and hopes no one at school ever finds out.
12	"Say Goodbye to My Cowardice"; Transliteration: "Okubyō Datta Jibun ni Sayōnara o" (Japanese: 臆病だった自分にさようならを)	Musashi Nakano	Keiichirō Ōchi	Kenichi Imaizumi	March 25, 2023
Immediately following their conversation, Amane threatens to silence her with a kiss if she keeps teasing him. Shockingly, Mahiru kisses him on the cheek, leaving him stunned. At school they are awkward, making Itsuki worry they are fighting. At home they agree the kiss was meaningless, though neither seem happy about it, and discuss Sports Day where they will both compete in the scavenger race. During the race, organized by Chitose, they select each other as the item they need to find and finish together despite being on opposite teams. It is then revealed Amane was supposed to find "someone beautiful" while Mahiru was supposed to find "someone special" to the utter amazement of the entire school. The boys are furious so Amane criticizes them for idolizing her as the Angel when to him, she is just Mahiru and he likes it that way. Mahiru likewise shames the boys for their behavior when it is none of their business. The rest of the students are put off by the duo's closeness and finally decide to leave them alone. Privately, Mahiru apologizes for causing him trouble, but Amane then apologizes for ignoring her feelings and reveals his own feelings fully, asking her to be his girlfriend which she happily accepts.

==== Season 2 (2026) ====
No.	Title	Directed by	Written by	Storyboard by	Original release date
1	"Going to School Together and Making a Debut"; Transliteration: "Futari de no Tōkō to Ohirome" (Japanese: 二人での登校とお披露目)	Chihiro Kumano	Keiichirō Ōchi	Chihiro Kumano	April 3, 2026
Mahiru and Amane agree to be honest about their feelings now they are dating. This leads to some awkwardness as neither knows what girlfriends and boyfriends should do together, knowing that they haven't already been doing anyway, such as spending time together, hugging and holding hands. Since everyone at school already knows they decide to walk to school together openly. Mahiru admits to some jealousy that girls might start to pay attention to him and has to resist clinging to him to show he is taken. Chitose is happy for them and credits herself with getting them together. Their classmates are obsessed with their new relationship and ask many questions. Their friends advise them they are actually being too lovey-dovey in public and might need to hold back a little. Mahiru is relieved all the boys who used to pursue her have now given up. They find they are both more popular, with Mahiru seeming more normal than angelic, and Amane no longer seen as antisocial.
2	"The Start of Summer Vacation"; Transliteration: "Natsuyasumi no Hajimari" (Japanese: 夏休みの始まり)	Teru Ishii	Keiichirō Ōchi	Chihiro Kumano	April 10, 2026
Mahiru and Amane are both curious as Amane has been having discussions with other boys and Mahiru has been asking Chitose for advice, but they agree they can keep some secrets from each other. Later, Mahiru reveals she bought a new swimsuits and that her heart races when she sees Amane shirtless. Amane admits to similar feelings but thinks they should restrain themselves. Mahiru admits to sometimes feeling disappointed at moments when he didn't kiss her. Amane kisses her cheek, then impulsively leaving a hickey on her neck. She attempts to give him one but fails to leave a mark. Summer break arrives and Amane invites Mahiru to meet his family for two weeks during Obon festival. They visit an indoor pool where Amane is made speechless by Mahiru in her new bikini and feels compelled to hide her from other boys. Feeling happy, Mahiru deliberately clings to him. While getting her used to the pool Amane admits he often thinks about kissing her but isn't ready to act on it yet. They are joined by Chitose and Itsuki, with Chitose revealing Mahiru has a second bikini; black and skimpy she isn't ready for Amane to see, yet.
3	"Homecoming and Revealing the Relationship"; Transliteration: "Kisei to Kako to no Ketsubetsu" (Japanese: 帰省と過去との決別)	Mio Nishimura & Yurina Utsugi	Keiichirō Ōchi	Chichiro Kumano	April 17, 2026
Amane and Mahiru visits his family for Obon, planning to eventually tell them about their relationship. His father takes Mahiru shopping while his mother Shihoko naturally guesses from their behaviour that they are dating and urges Amane to marry her quickly. Amane is perturbed that Shuto also already knew and has already told Mahiru all his embarrassing childhood stories, plus later they show her his childhood photographs. As his parents have to work Amane takes Mahiru around town. There, they encounter Tojo, one of the fake friends from his childhood who manipulated him for money. Tojo, who hasn't changed at all, tries to intimidate Amane in front of Mahiru and is confused when Amane doesn't react. Mahiru is also unimpressed and informs Tojo that unless he changes as a person he will have a very lonely life. That night while stargazing, Mahiru admits she was impressed with his mature attitude toward Tojo, so Amane impulsively kisses her. Mahiru enjoys it so much they kiss several more times before falling asleep in each other's arms.
4	"A Stay-at-Home Date with the Angel"; Transliteration: "Tenshi-sama to Ōchi Dēto" (Japanese: 天使様とおうちデート)	Ryō Ishimaru	Keiichirō Ōchi	Chichiro Kumano	April 24, 2026
Having enjoyed sharing a bed Amane and Mahiru agree to do so several times a month. Amane's parents are glad he handled Tojo with maturity and seems to have gotten over the past. While his parents are at work Amane and Mahiru practise "making out" but decide to stop before they go too far. His parents invite them to a family day out, which they accept. After enjoying the family shopping trip Mahiru asks Amane for a private date, but soon afterwards it begins to rain non-stop, so they must cancel their date. Mahiru is annoyed Amane knows her ears are a weak spot and swears to find a weak spot on him that makes him weak at the knees. Mahiru decides to have their date at home and wears the dress she bought during Golden Week, which Amane hadn't seen her wear yet. Mahiru notices him acting bolder than normal during the date. Amane asks if their next indoor date can be at her apartment as he is curious to see the photograph she has of him on her desk. Mahiru is surprised he knows about the picture and admits it is one Itsuki took of him smiling. Mahiru hopes they can visit his parents again soon, with Amane pleased she could relax around them.
5	"A Summer Festival with the Angel"; Transliteration: "Tenshi-sama to Natsumatsuri" (Japanese: 天使様と夏祭り)	Jun Taira	Keiichirō Ōchi	Chichiro Kumano	May 1, 2026
Amane and Mahiru decides to attend a fireworks festival. They encounter Hanada, another of Amane's former friends, who never bullied him but often stood by as it was happening. Hanada is glad Amane has moved on and seems to be happy. They part amicably, with no plans to see each other again. Mahiru is proud of Amane for facing his past so easily and hopes one day she can confront her own past. With Obon over Amane and Mahiru return home with open invitations to visit his parents again whenever they wish. At the fireworks festival with Itsuki and Chitose, Amane wins a hair ornament for Mahiru. Chitose notes Amane and Mahiru are obsessed with each other and is surprised they haven't considered sex yet when Mahiru was so eager for Chitose's advice on how to kiss Amane. Amane is surprised Chitose is spending a girls night with Mahiru in her apartment. Chitose later video calls Amane to ask how serious he is about Mahiru, as recently Itsuki's cynical father made her worried that very few teenage romances lead to long term relationships. She is happy Amane is serious about Mahiru.
6	"A Once-Desired, Now Undesired Meeting, and a Resolution"; Transliteration: "Katsute Nozonda Nozomanu Deai, to Ketsui" (Japanese: かつて望んだ望まぬ出会い,と決意)	Sumi Taniyasuie	Keiichirō Ōchi	Chichiro Kumano	May 8, 2026
Amane encounters a man he strongly suspects to be Mahiru's father. He informs Mahiru, who doubts it was her father as visiting is something he would never do without making an appointment. Amane asks Itsuki's advice, who believes suddenly trying to get in touch could be caused by either important news or a sudden change of heart regarding his prior neglect. Amane receives an invitation to meet her father, Asahi. Mahiru leaves the decision up to Amane, as she is uninterested in seeing her father, since the invitation didn't include her anyway. Asahi simply wants to know how Mahiru is doing. Amane notes Asahi isn't as cold towards Mahiru as her mother, so his lifelong neglect is even more confusing. Asahi claims his reasons for checking on Mahiru are complicated, angering Amane since his neglect has hurt Mahiru deeply. Asahi feels guilty for this, so Amane assures him he will continue making her happy. Mahiru is glad Asahi has no plans to interfere in her life but notes his concern for her happiness has come too late. Amane promises to support her, so she asks to stay the night as she doesn't want to be alone. Mahiru is back to normal the next morning, so they attend their first day of the new school year together.
7	"The Angel's Pleas"; Transliteration: "Tenshi-sama no Onedari" (Japanese: 天使様のおねだり)	Jun Taira	Keiichirō Ōchi	Chichiro Kumano	May 15, 2026
After borrowing his study notes Chitose offers Amane embarrassing photos of Mahiru. As they have exams, Amane wonders what rewards they should do if they score in the top ten again. Mahiru requests one of his pillows so she can still smell him when they sleep in their own apartments. After exams Chitose takes Mahiru out to celebrate. Itsuki warns Amane that Chitose is probably putting illicit ideas in Mahiru's head. That evening Mahiru decides to lie down on top of Amane on the sofa. They discuss that they are happy to keep taking things slowly, but eventually they should have a conversation about sex. For culture festival their class chooses Maid Café. Amane is unsure about letting everyone see Mahiru as a maid, but Mahiru reassures him she will let him be the first to see her. Amane's parents ask to attend the festival so he suggests Mahiru invite her former housekeeper Koyuki. Mahiru reveals Koyuki is too ill to move around much anymore, but Amane still wants to meet her one day. Mahiru comes first in the exams but admits rather than the pillow she wants a real kiss. Afterwards. Mahiru further admits she wants more physical intimacy in the future, to which Amane agrees.
8	"Culture Festival, Day One"; Transliteration: "Bunkasai, Kaimaku" (Japanese: 文化祭, 開幕)	Sumi Taniyasuie	Keiichirō Ōchi	Chichiro Kumano	May 22, 2026
While Amane's class works really hard for the cultural festival, Ayaka gets him to try to smile, following to an intimate moment between him and Mahiru while talking about boy types. After the uniforms for the butler/maid café have arrived, Mahiru asks Amane through Ayaka to come and see her in a maid outfit, which he complimented. While alone, Mahiru shares her concerns about Amane's growing popularity among the girls, to which he shrugs it off and comforts Mahiru. After the whole class get into their uniforms, the start practicing their customer service skills, and while the girls ask Yuta be his training partners, Mahiru asks Amane to be his training partner instead. Their training receives a praise from the class. Concerning about Mahiru get a lot of attention from the male customers, Amane resolves to keep a close watch on Mahiru. On the first day of the Seijo cultural festival, the cafe in Amane's class becomes very popular with Mahiru becoming popular with the men and Amane and Yuta with the women respectively. While the male customers try to make a move on Mahiru, which she repelled, Amane receives a lot of concerns from Kazuya, Makoto and Yuta about Mahiru. Then Amane caught a molester trying to make a move on Mahiru, for which the criminal is taken away. After their shift is over, Amane and Mahiru have a walk through the festival, where they ran into Ayaka and her boyfriend Souji. After a scary time in the haunted house, the couple run into Itsuki's father Daiki. After exchanging greetings, Daiki goes of to enjoy the festival while revealing his uneasiness about the wrong time. Amane reveals to Mahiru his inability to have Daiki accept Itsuki and Chitose's relationship. Mahiru is also concerned about Itsuki and Chitose, which Amane understands. After returning to class, Amane tells Itsuki about Daiki, which makes him feel uneasy. At the end of day, Amane's class takes a break where Amane teases Mahiru, which makes the later uneasy. And the first day of festival ends with a concert, where Yuta is the lead singer in the band.
9	"The Angel's Request"; Transliteration: "Tenshi-sama no Onegai" (Japanese: 天使様のお願い)	Mio Nishimura & Yurina Utsugi	Keiichirō Ōchi	Chichiro Kumano	May 29, 2026
Amane's parents attend the festival. While discussing clothes making with Ayaka, Mahiru admits she imagines Amane naked. Amane worries when his mother becomes friends with Chitose. Itsuki avoids his father Daiki. Daiki admits he has not been kind towards Chitose, but he fears Itsuki is making a mistake. Amane's parents assure him he raised a good man, and Amane urges him to reconsider Chitose. Daiki decides to stop interfering, but remains concerned. Amane explains Daiki is wealthy with an older son as family heir, so Itsuki resents Daiki trying to control him. Mahiru admits to some jealousy, since at least Itsuki's father tries to have a relationship with him. Itsuki is not surprised by what Daiki said, and decides to tell Amane everything. His brother is eight years older but became rebellious in his 20's and impulsively married his girlfriend. Years later, he made up with Daiki but during the years he was absent Daiki became overly strict with Itsuki and rejected Chitose, who reminded him of his brother's wife. This was made worse when Itsuki was injured protecting Chitose and Daiki blamed her. Having spent two days serving customers at the café, Amane and Mahiru enjoy spending some time alone. Mahiru asks if she can sleep in Amane's apartment.
10	"An Important Promise with the Angel"; Transliteration: "Tenshi-sama to Taisetsuna Yakusoku" (Japanese: 天使様と大切な約束)	Jun Taira	Keiichirō Ōchi	Chichiro Kumano	June 5, 2026
Mahiru confirms she wants to stay over because she feels ready for sex. Amane worries about hurting her, despite her reassurances. Following stories she heard from Chitose, she asks if they can share a bath, albeit with swimsuits, as Amane fears losing control if they are naked. This allows Mahiru to debut the skimpy black bikini she bought during Obon. After washing his hair and back for him they discuss how much they mean to each other. Mahiru also admits everything she is doing was planned out beforehand by the meddling Chitose. Getting in the bath together Mahiru senses from his heartbeat he is close to losing control. After the bath Amane admits while he wants to be with her forever he is nervous about the potential consequences, so Mahiru agrees to wait until he feels ready. They fall asleep making out instead, and next morning Amane is embarrassed Mahiru has a new hicky on her neck. Amane's parents visit, with Shihoko taking Mahiru shopping so Amane and Shuto can talk. Shuto reveals it has been obvious Amane wants to marry Mahiru, so he reassures him they are happy to pay for the wedding if it stops them having to struggle by themselves. Amane decides to get a job.
11	"First Part-time Job"; Transliteration: "Hajimete no Baito" (Japanese: 初めてのバイト)	Sumi Taniyasuie	Keiichirō Ōchi	Chichiro Kumano	June 12, 2026
Ayaka promises to introduce Amane to her aunt who owns a café. Amane admits to her he plans to buy Mahiru an engagement ring. Shihoko invites Mahiru and Chitose shopping, worrying Amane she is up to something. Itsuki is not surprised Amane decided not to have sex yet, and disappointed Amane never asked him for advice. With the girls shopping, Amane spends time with his father. He is later outraged Shihoko convinced Mahiru to buy him a black cat pyjama outfit, though feels better she bought herself bunny rabbit pyjamas. Amane gets the job at the café, pleasing Ayaka as her boyfriend Kayano works there and she hopes they will be friends. Ayaka guiltily admits she refuses to work for her aunt Fumika, who loves to pry into people's personal lives and is also an author, so she is somewhat eccentric. Mahiru enjoys hearing Amane's childhood stories from Shihoko as she does not have any stories from her childhood. Amane wonders what their future child might be like. At work, Amane meets other employees Daichi and Rino. He is surprised to find he enjoys coming home where Mahiru is waiting for him. Mahiru decides to visit him at work to see his uniform, and see him have to smile at customers.
12	"The Angel's Big Day Arrives"; Transliteration: "Soshite Mukaeta Tenshi-sama no X Day" (Japanese: そうして迎えた天使様のXデー)	Sumi Taniyasuie	Keiichirō Ōchi	Chichiro Kumano	June 19, 2026
Mahiru wants to cook something special for Amane. Amane becomes suspicious of her sneaking around hiding things from him but decides not to make a fuss. While trying to hug her, Mahiru pulls away, revealing she has been snacking recently and is afraid he will feel she has gained weight. Amane denies this but notices she smells of chocolate. Mahiru scolds him for leaving marks on her neck again, causing Chitose to tease her, so Amane promises to put the next mark somewhere no one will see it, shocking her. The next day is Amane's birthday, which he totally forgot. Mahiru cooks him his favourite dishes and reveals she has been practising to make gateau au chocolat with coffee beans provided by Fumika. She also gifts him a silver tie pin to wear on his work uniform. For her final gift she agrees to any request he wants for the rest of the day. Amane chooses the lap pillow, so Mahiru obliges wearing her new bunny pyjamas. Mahiru admits since he started working she has felt anxious and lonely waiting for him to get home, but is afraid of becoming jealous and needy. Amane is certain he is needier than her, but after affirming they only care about each other, they fall asleep in each other's arms.

=== Video game ===
An adventure video game developed by Mages, titled Otonari no Tenshi-sama ni Itsu no Ma ni ka Dame Ningen ni Sareteita Ken Memorial Vacation, was released on Nintendo Switch and Nintendo Switch 2 on July 23, 2026.

== Reception ==
The light novel ranked tenth in Takarajimasha's annual light novel guide book Kono Light Novel ga Sugoi! in the bunkobon category, and sixth overall among the other new series in 2020. The series has sold one hundred thousand copies by April 2020.

According to Oricon, in the first week of release the fifth volume sold 19,791 copies in Japan, which placed it first on the Oricon Weekly Light Novel chart.

Both the light novel and season one of the anime series have received positive reviews from critics, for the artsyle, characters, voice acting and emotional depth.

== See also ==
- Saint Cecilia and Pastor Lawrence, manga series illustrated by Hazano Kazutake
