= Masanori Sera =

Japanese actor and singer

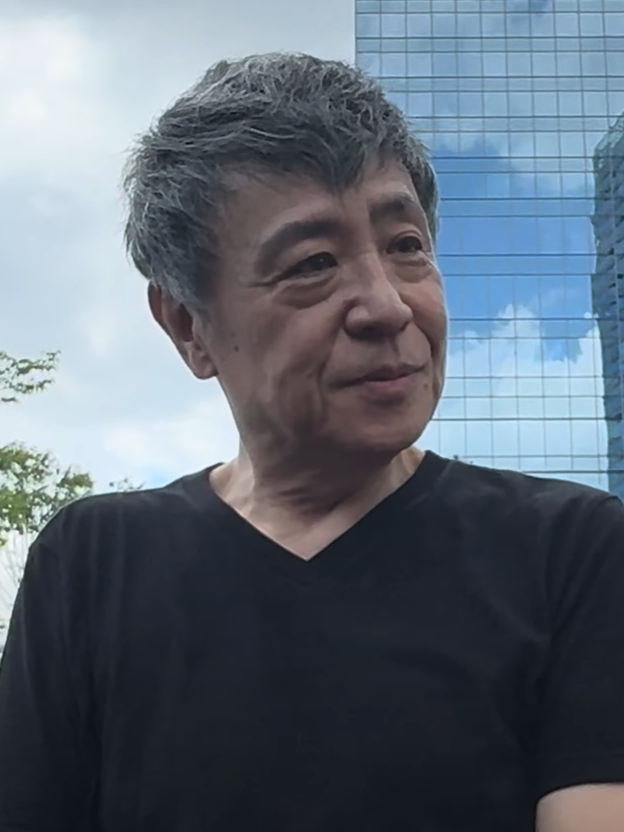
- Born: 14 December 1955 (age 70); Fukuyama, Hiroshima Prefecture, Japan
- Occupations: Actor, singer
- Years active: 1977–present
- Website: seraproject.com

Masanori Sera (Japanese: 世良公則) (born 14 December 1955) is a Japanese singer and actor from Fukuyama. He graduated from Osaka University of Arts. As a singer Sera's rock band, Sera Masanori&TWIST appeared in the Kōhaku Uta Gassen twice (1978 and 1979). He made his solo debut with the single Tokyo rouge (Tokyo指紅) in 1982.

As an actor, he appeared in popular detective drama Taiyō ni Hoero! from 1982 to 1984. In 1998, he won Best Supporting Actor award at the 22nd Japan Academy Prize (film award) for his role in Dr. Akagi.

== Discography ==
=== Singles ===
- Anta no Ballard (1977)
- Yado Nashi(1978)
- Hikigane (1978)
- Saga (1978)
- Moero Iionna (1979)
- Soppo (1979)
- Love Song (1980)
- Set me free (1981)
- Doukasen (1984)
- Against The Wind (1986)
- Heart Is Gold (1987)
- Yatterman no Uta (2008)
- Itsumo no Uta (2015)
- Anatani (2020)
- On the Sunny side of the street (2022)

=== Albums ===
- Masanori Sera (1982)
- Iam (1985)
- Fine and you? (1985)
- Be Fine (1986)
- THIS IS (1986)
- Tough in the city (1987)
- Nemurenai Machi (1990)
- Fun to Fun (1991)
- Return (1992)
- Do (1995)
- Born to be Rockin (2001)
- 1977 (2002)
- Show Twist songs (2003)
- We are Guild9 (2007)
- UNDER COVER Sera Masanori solo singles (2008)
- the ultimate WE ARE GUILD9 (2012)
- BACKBONE (2012)
- Otoko no Uta (2015)
- Premium BEST Songs&Live (2015)
- Howling Wolves (2017)

== Filmography ==
=== Film ===
- W's Tragedy (1984)
- Yakuza Wives (1986)
- Aitsu ni Koishite (1987)
- Onihei's Detective Records (1995)
- Dr. Akagi (1998)
- Whistleblower (2019)
- Little Love Song (2019)

=== Television ===
- Taiyō ni Hoero! (1982–84) as Hajime Kasukabe (Bogey)
- Shadow Warriors (1985) as Ryoma Sakamoto
- Marumo no Okite (2011) as Yosuke Hatanaka
- Umechan Sensei (2012) as Shunichiro Sakata
- Downtown Rocket (2016)
- Come Come Everybody (2021)

=== Dubbing ===
- Lethal Weapon 2 as Detective Martin Riggs (Mel Gibson)
