= Umi no Koe =

2015 single by Kenta Kiritani

"Umi no Koe (海の声)"

Song by Kenta Kiritani, BEGIN

from the album Kanon
- Released: July 31, 2015 (limited digital release); December 2, 2015
- Genre: Okinawan folk, Japanese folk
- Length: 3:49
- Label: Universal Music Japan
- Songwriters: Makoto Shinohara (lyrics); Masaru Shimabukuro of BEGIN (music)
- Producer: Hiroaki Yamashita

Music video
- 「海の声」 フルver. on YouTube

Umi no Koe (海の声, literally 'Voice of the Sea'), is a digital single by Japanese actor Kenta Kiritani, performing as the character Urashimataro (浦島太郎) that was a part of the au "Santarō" commercial series. Originally conceived as a promotional jingle, the song became a hit in Japan, topping digital charts. It was pre-released as a digital song from July 31 to August 31, 2015 through LISMO store, and later distributed more widely on December 2, 2015. Its popularity grew with its inclusion on Kiritani’s debut album Kanon. It topped annual charts in 2016, selling over a million digital copies. It was certified by the RIAJ in April 2016.

The song reimagines classic Japanese folklore characters like Urashimataro, Momotarō, and Kintarō as friends. The music video features Kiritani alongside Shota Matsuda as Momotarō (Momo-chan), Gaku Hamada as Kintarō (Kin-chan), and Kasumi Arimura as Kaguya-hime (Kagu-chan).The lyrical and musical inspiration draws directly from the Urashimataro folktale, with the protagonist longing for Princess Otohime as he gazes at the sea that separates them. The lyrics use metaphors about nature to convey the narrator’s longing. He implores the sky, wind and sea to carry his voice to his love, Oto-hime (Oto-chan).

== Summary ==
The track was created as a commercial song for the au Santaro commercial series, specifically for the "au Garaho 'Umi no Koe'" advertisement. In the commercial, Kiritani plays the traditional character Urashimataro (affectionately called Ura-chan) and performs the song. The advertisement was produced to promote a new au flip phone and began broadcasting on July 17, 2015.

The lyrics were written by Makoto Shinohara, a commercial planner for Dentsu who worked on the au Santaro series, while the music was composed by Masaru Shimabukuro (島袋優) (guitar) of the acoustic band BEGIN. When composing the music, Shimabukuro spent five days watching videos of Kiritani to understand his vocal style before writing the song over a two-day period.

Original Japanese
空の声が 聞きたくて
風の声に 耳すませ
海の声が 知りたくて
君の声を 探してる
Romaji
Sora no koe ga kikitakute
Kaze no koe ni mimi sumase
Umi no koe ga shiritakute
Kimi no koe o sagashiteru
English Translation
I wanted to hear the voice of the sky
So I listened to the voice of the wind
I wanted to know the voice of the sea
So I'm searching for your voice

== Production ==
=== Concept ===
The campaign aimed to promote au’s "Garaho" line of hybrid smartphones. It was originally a commercial tie-in for KDDI’s "au Santarō" campaign, was digitally pre-released as a digital song from July 31 to August 31, 2015 through LISMO store, and officially released on December 2, 2015, by Universal Music Japan.

=== Sound production and lyrics ===
The project was a collaboration between the Okinawan folk-rock band BEGIN and au's marketing team. Makoto Shinohara, the creative director behind the commercials, wrote the lyrics. Shimabukuro of BEGIN composed the music.

The production team focused on a minimalist, acoustic sound. The song is a slow-tempo Okinawan folk ballad,

Domestically, it peaked at number 3 on the Billboard Japan Hot 100 and held the top spot on digital charts for several months. In 2016, it became the most-requested song in Japanese karaoke parlours, topping both the JOYSOUND and DAM rankings. By April 2016, the RIAJ certified the song for over one million digital sales.

Despite not being a trained musician at the start of the project, Kiritani performed the vocals and played the sanshin (a three-stringed Okinawan lute). Kiritani insisted on playing the instrument himself to maintain the character's authenticity. The recording sessions were held in 2015, with arrangements provided by Hiroaki Yamashita. Kiritani performed the sanshin accompaniment on the recorded track himself.

== Commercial performance ==
It was released as a limited-time free download for Android smartphone users via the LISMO store in mid-2015. It was subsequently released across all major digital platforms on 2 December 2015.

=== Release ===
From July 31 to August 31, 2015, the track was distributed exclusively through the au music services "Uta Pass" and "LISMO Store". It received a wide release across all major digital platforms on December 2 of the same year. Following this wider release, the single achieved the number-one spot on thirteen different digital charts, including the iTunes Store and RecoChoku.

On April 29, 2016, the track was released globally in 251 countries and territories, including the United Kingdom, Germany, France, the United States, Mexico, Brazil, Taiwan, Hong Kong, South Korea, Singapore, and Indonesia.

=== Influence ===
The song created a renewed interest in Okinawan folk music among younger Japanese people. Former Yomiuri Giants outfielder Garrett Jones and Orix Buffaloes infielder Koji Oshiro have both used the song as their batter walk-up music. Kenta Kiritani performed it at the 67th NHK Kōhaku Uta Gassen in 2016. Various artists have covered the song. Hibiki Ganaha (voiced by Manami Numakura) featured on the 2020 album THE IDOLM@STER MASTER ARTIST 4 05 Ganaha Hibiki. Ryukyu Mura performed it as a traditional Okinawan arrangement on the 2017 compilation Ryukyu Nabi Road. BEGIN also performs their own version during live concerts.

=== Awards ===
Year	Award	Category
2016	49th Japan Cable Awards	Special Award
2016	58th Japan Record Awards	Excellent Work Award
2016	JOYSOUND Best Karaoke of the Year 2016	JOYSOUND Annual Karaoke Ranking No. 1
2017	NexTone Award 2017	Bronze Medal

=== Charts and certifications ===
The song was recognised by the RIAJ as certified 'Million' (Single Track). It also won the 58th Japan Record Awards: Excellent Work Award The song also hit multiple Billboard Japan lists including the Hot 100, Weekly No. 3, and 2016 Year-End No. 14

Year	Chart / Award	Peak position
2016	RecoChoku Award Monthly Best Song (January)	1
2016	RecoChoku Award Monthly Best Song (February)	1
2016	Annual Digital Download Ranking (RecoChoku)	1
2016	Annual Digital Download Ranking – Singles (music.jp)	1
2016	Annual Digital Download Ranking – Combined Singles (mora)	1
2016	Annual Digital Download Ranking – Singles (TSUTAYA Musico♪)	1
2016	Annual Digital Download Ranking – Singles (mysound)	1
2016	Amazon.co.jp Ranking Awards 2016 – Combined Digital Music	2
2016	Annual USEN Hit J-Pop Ranking	8
2016	Annual Billboard Japan Hot 100	14
2016	JOYSOUND Annual Karaoke Ranking	1
2016	DAM Annual Karaoke Request Ranking	14
2016	Japan (RIAJ) Million (Single Track)	1

=== Cover versions ===
Release date	Artist	Album / Single	Notes
October 28, 2015	Begin	Sugar Cane Cable Network	Self-cover version. Certified Gold for digital single tracks by the RIAJ.
January 31, 2016	Iduhe	i-dushi	
June 17, 2016	Matt Cab	Digital single	Covered in English.
August 24, 2016	Island Bag	Stars in the Sand	Covered in English.
September 24, 2016	Softly	Ienakata Koto. Iitai Koto.	Some lyrics were modified because Softly is a female duo.
October 20, 2016	Haruoid Minami	Digital single	A virtual singer developed using singing voice synthesis technology based on the voice of Haruo Minami.
April 1, 2017	Nise Taro (Tomoya Maeno)	Web exclusive	Released as an au April Fools' Day prank under the title Gumi no Koe (Voice of the Gummy). The track was accessible on a special website from April 1 to April 7, 2017.
September 13, 2017	Beni	Covers the City	Covered with English lyrics.
December 20, 2017	Ryota Kaizo	TV Tokyo's "The Karaoke Battle" BEST ALBUM III	
December 20, 2017	Miyakawakun	On Your Mark	Digital edition exclusive bonus track.
June 22, 2018	Nenes	MAPAI	
November 14, 2018	Fumika	Cover Life	Pre-released digitally on July 25, 2018.
May 29, 2019	Han-Kun	Musical Ambassador	
June 5, 2019	Keisuke Kuwata	Live DVD Heisei Sanjū-nendo! Daisan-kai Hitori Kōhaku Uta Gassen	Kuwata had previously placed this song at number four on his personal radio program ranking feature, "Keisuke Kuwata's Choice of 2015 Japanese Pop Single Best 20". He praised the track, calling it a moving piece that showed the positive evolution of Japanese popular music.
November 11, 2020	Hibiki Ganaha (voiced by Manami Numakura)	The Idolm@ster Master Artist 4 #05 Hibiki Ganaha	
July 27, 2022	Haruki Ishiya	[Re:collection] HIT SONG cover series feat.voice actors 〜10's-20's EDITION〜	

== Track listing ==
'Umi no Koe' (3:47)
Lyrics: Makoto Shinohara Composition: Masaru Shimabukuro (島袋優) (BEGIN) Arrangement: Hiroaki Yamashita
Sanshin: Kenta Kiritani
