= Milk (Japanese band) =

Japanese boy band

- Origin: Japan
- Genre: J-pop
- Years active: 2014–present
- Labels: SDR (2014–2021); Colourful Records (2021–present)
- Members: Hayato Sano; Daichi Shiozaki; Shunta Sono; Jyutaro Yamanaka; Jinto Yoshida
- Past members: Haruki Yamazaki; Mizuki Itagaki; Ryubi Miyase
- Website: sd-milk.com

Milk (stylized M!LK) is a five-member Japanese male idol group and dance-vocal group. They are managed by Stardust Promotion, and the group was formed in 2014 by members of Ebidan 39, a division of the larger EBiDAN umbrella. Their fans are collectively known as Milkies (M!LKies; み！るきーず).

== Overview ==
In 2025, M!LK gained widespread attention after their song "Ii Jan" went viral on social media. The phrase "Kyō mo bijū ii jan" ("You look great today"), taken from the song, became widely used as an internet meme on social media. The song's lyrics and simple choreography contributed to its popularity on TikTok, while the phrase was also used as a compliment directed at oneself or others.

On February 25, 2026, "Bakuretsu Aishiteru" reached number one on the Billboard Japan Hot 100, becoming M!LK's first song to top the chart.

At the 2026 Music Awards Japan, M!LK received five awards, including Best Boys Idol Culture Artist. Their song "Sukisugite Metsu!" won Best Boys Idol Culture Song, Best Viral Song, Karaoke Song of the Year for J-Pop, and Best Family Song. During his acceptance speech, member Jyutaro Yamanaka described idols as having the ability to make people smile, while Hayato Sano credited the group's fans, known as M!LKies, for supporting their career.

In May 2026, an analysis published on the Japanese platform Note reported that M!LK had approximately 2.56 million monthly listeners on Spotify. The article attributed the figure to continued interest following the success of "Ii Jan" and the subsequent releases "Bakuretsu Aishiteru" and "Sukisugite Metsu!", arguing that the group's streaming audience had expanded beyond listeners of a single viral song.

== Members ==
=== Current ===
Name		Born	Member color	Note
Romanization	Kanji	Born	Member color	Note
Hayato Sano	佐野勇斗	March 23, 1998 Aichi, Japan	Peach Hip Pink Okazaki	
Jinto Yoshida	吉田仁人	December 15, 1999 Kagoshima, Japan	Glimmering Yellow	Leader
Daichi Shiozaki	塩﨑太智	September 11, 2000 Wakayama, Japan	Sapphire Blue	
Jyutaro Yamanaka	山中柔太朗	December 23, 2001 Tochigi, Japan	Crystal White	
Shunta Sono	曽野舜太	May 3, 2002 Mie, Japan	Happy Red	

=== Former ===
- Haruki Yamazaki (山﨑悠稀)
- Mizuki Itagaki (板垣瑞生)
- Ryubi Miyase (宮世琉弥)

== Discography ==
=== EPs ===
List of EPs, with selected chart positions and sales
Title	EP details	Peak	Sales
Title	EP details	JPN	Sales
Love Engine	Released: September 16, 2026; Label: Colourful Records; Formats: CD, digital download	1	JPN: 915,966

=== Singles ===
List of major singles, with selected chart positions and sales
No.	Title	Year	Peak	Sales	Album
No.	Title	Year	JPN	Sales	Album
1	"Ribbon"	2021	4	JPN: 27,146	Jewel
2	"Kiseki ga Sora ni Koi wo Hibikaseta" (奇跡が空に恋を響かせた)	2022	1	JPN: 29,029	Jewel
3	"Stars"	2022	4	JPN: 41,820	Jewel
4	"Kiss Plan"	2024	2	JPN: 48,445	M!X
5	"Blue Shower" (ブルーシャワー)	2024	3	JPN: 55,580	M!X
6	"Everybody Good Job!" (エビバディグッジョブ！)	2024	2	JPN: 50,401	M!X
7	"Ao no Oto" (アオノオト)	2025	2	JPN: 108,120	TBA
8	"Bakuretsu Aishiteru / Sukisugite Metsu!" (爆裂愛してる/好きすぎて滅!)	2026	2	JPN: 472,337	TBA

== NHK Kōhaku Uta Gassen appearances ==
Number	Year	Edition	Song	Appearance order	Opponent	Remarks
1	2025	76th	イイじゃん (Ii Jan, "Isn't It Good?")	10/42	LiSA	Kōhaku debut. M!LK also performed as backup dancers for Fuyumi Sakamoto and TUBE.
2	2026	77th	TBA	TBA	TBA	TBA
