= Manaka Iwami =

Japanese voice actress

- 石見 舞菜香
- Born: Saitama Prefecture, Japan
- Occupation: Voice actress
- Years active: 2016–present
- Agent: Raccoon Dog
- Notable work: The Angel Next Door Spoils Me Rotten as Mahiru Shiina; Demon Slayer: Kimetsu no Yaiba as Chuntaro; Oshi no Ko as Akane Kurokawa; Fruits Basket as Tohru Honda; The Magical Revolution of the Reincarnated Princess and the Genius Young Lady as Euphyllia Magenta; Maquia: When the Promised Flower Blooms as Maquia; Spy × Family as Millie; Tada Never Falls in Love as Teresa Wagner; Umamusume: Pretty Derby as Rice Shower; Though I Am an Inept Villainess as Kou Reirin
- Spouse: unknown (m. 2026)
- Children: 1

Manaka Iwami (石見 舞菜香, Iwami Manaka) is a Japanese voice actress. She won the Seiyu Award for Best Rookie Actress at the 13th Seiyu Awards and the Best Supporting Actor award at the 18th Seiyu Awards.

== Personal life ==
On October 13, 2026, Iwami announced that she had married a non-celebrity and has given birth to her first child.

== Filmography ==
=== Anime ===
Year	Title	Role
2017	Children of the Whales	Rikosu
2017	Gamers!	Chiaki Hoshinomori
2017	Monster Strike	Girl
2017	New Game!	Hotaru Hoshikawa
2017	Re:Creators	Erina Talker
2017	Tsuki ga Kirei	Aira Miyamoto
2017	Urahara	Kotoko Watatsumugi
2017	WorldEnd	Lakhesh Nyx Seniorious
2018	Kakuriyo: Bed & Breakfast for Spirits	Chibi
2018	Maquia: When the Promised Flower Blooms	Maquia
2018	Phantom in the Twilight	Mu Shinyao
2018	Rokuhōdō Yotsuiro Biyori	Kotsuru Tenshin
2018	Tada Never Falls in Love	Teresa Wagner
2019	Demon Slayer: Kimetsu no Yaiba	Chuntaro
2019	Fruits Basket	Tohru Honda
2019	Granbelm	Kuon Tsuchimikado
2019	Revisions	Marin Temari
2019	Rifle Is Beautiful	Ryōko Mochizuki
2019	The Ones Within	Himiko Inaba
2020	Love Live! Nijigasaki High School Idol Club	Christina
2020	Magia Record: Puella Magi Madoka Magica Side Story	Ui Tamaki
2020	Re:Zero	Carmilla
2020	Wave, Listen to Me!	Mizuho Nanba
2021	Blue Reflection Ray	Hiori Hirahara
2021	Higehiro	Yuuko Masaka
2021	Log Horizon: Destruction of the Round Table	Lelia Mofur
2021	Remake Our Life!	Miki Morishita
2021	To Your Eternity	Rean
2021	Umamusume: Pretty Derby	Rice Shower
2022	Akiba Maid War	Nerula
2022	Arknights: Prelude to Dawn	Exusiai
2022	Black Summoner	Efil
2022	Boruto	Neon Asakusa
2022	The Dawn of the Witch	Riiri
2022	The Executioner and Her Way of Life	Manon
2022	Fruits Basket: Prelude	Tohru Honda
2022	In the Heart of Kunoichi Tsubaki	Mizubashō
2022	Phantom of the Idol	Shigutaro
2022	Romantic Killer	Saki
2022	RPG Real Estate	Rakira
2022	Spy × Family	Millie
2022	Tokyo 24th Ward	Asumi Suidō
2023	Am I Actually the Strongest?	Marianne
2023	The Angel Next Door Spoils Me Rotten	Mahiru Shiina
2023	The Aristocrat's Otherworldly Adventure: Serving Gods Who Go Too Far	Teres
2023	Frieren	Linie
2023	The Great Cleric	Monika
2023	In/Spectre	Rion Otonashi
2023	The Magical Revolution of the Reincarnated Princess and the Genius Young Lady	Euphyllia Magenta
2023	Oshi no Ko	Akane Kurokawa
2023	Rakudai Majo	Karin
2023	Ron Kamonohashi's Forbidden Deductions	Younger Sister
2023	Sugar Apple Fairy Tale	Noah
2023	The Vexations of a Shut-In Vampire Princess	Sakuna Memoir
2023	World Dai Star	Kokona Ōtori
2023	Zom 100: Bucket List of the Dead	Touko Kanbayashi
2024	The Fire Hunter	Yururuho / Sennen Suisei
2024	Fureru	Nana Asakawa
2024	I'll Become a Villainess Who Goes Down in History	Cather Liz
2024	Mayonaka Punch	Sakura
2024	Narenare: Cheer for You!	Nodoka Ōtani
2024	The Strongest Magician in the Demon Lord's Army Was a Human	Dairokuten
2025	Ameku M.D.: Doctor Detective	Mai Konoike
2025	Chitose Is in the Ramune Bottle	Yuuko Hiiragi
2025	Eiga Odekake Kozame Tokai no Otomodachi	Sora
2025	Gachiakuta	Eishia
2025	Guilty Gear Strive: Dual Rulers	Bridget
2025	I Was Reincarnated as the 7th Prince so I Can Take My Time Perfecting My Magical Ability	Iisha
2025	Lazarus	Eleina
2025	Necronomico and the Cosmic Horror Show	Mayu Mayusaka, Cthulhu
2025	Rascal Does Not Dream of Santa Claus	Miori Mitō
2025	Si-Vis: The Sound of Heroes	Nagi
2025	Teogonia	Elsa
2025	Toi-san	Haruka Shirakawa
2025	Tougen Anki	Homare Byobugaura
2025	Who Made Me a Princess	Jennette
2025	Whoever Steals This Book	Uhara
2025	With You, Our Love Will Make It Through	Mari Asaka
2025	Yaiba: Samurai Legend	Sayaka Mine
2025	Zenshu	Destiny Heartwarming
2026	The Angel Next Door Spoils Me Rotten: Season 2	Mahiru Shiina
2026	Chained Soldier 2	Bell Tsukiyono
2026	Hotel Inhumans	Hikaru Matsuki
2026	I Made Friends with the Second Prettiest Girl in My Class	Umi Asanagi
2026	The Insipid Prince's Furtive Grab for the Throne	Fine von Kleinert
2026	Jack-of-All-Trades, Party of None	Caroline Inglaud
2026	Magilumiere Magical Girls Inc. Season 2	Sakae Tōnomori
2026	The Ogre's Bride	Karin Shinonome
2026	Rascal Does Not Dream of a Dear Friend	Miori Mitō
2026	The Villager of Level 999	Krull
2026	Though I Am an Inept Villainess	Kou Reirin
TBA	Heir to a Monstermancer	Leen

=== Video games ===
Year	Title	Role
2016	Othellonia	Radola
2018	Dragalia Lost	Pia
2018	White Cat Project	Eleanor
2018	Umamusume: Pretty Derby	Rice Shower
2019	Arknights	Exusiai / Warfarin
2019	Fire Emblem: Three Houses	Ingrid Brandl Galatea
2019	Magia Record	Ui Tamaki
2020	Cytus 2	Nora
2020	King's Raid	Tanya, Talisha
2020	Girls' Frontline	CF05 & SIG-556
2020	Death End Request 2	Liliana Pinnata
2020	Genshin Impact	Amber
2020	The Legend of Heroes: Trails into Reverie	Nadia Rayne
2021	Counter:Side	Kim Sobin
2021	Famicom Detective Club: The Girl Who Stands Behind	Yoko Kojima
2021	Blue Reflection: Second Light	Hiori Hirahara
2022	Granblue Fantasy	Satyr, Bhaisa
2022	Hatsune Miku: Colorful Stage!	Futaba Natsuno
2022	The Legend of Heroes: Trails Through Daybreak II	Nadia Rayne
2022	Fate/Grand Order	Huyan Zhuo
2022	Fire Emblem Warriors: Three Hopes	Ingrid Brandl Galatea
2022	Guilty Gear Strive	Bridget
2022	Dragon Quest Treasures	Gayle, Monsters
2023	Da Capo 5	Yukina Tokisaka
2023	UsoNatsu ~The Summer Romance Bloomed From A Lie~	Shiori Minagi
2023	Takt Op. Symphony	Für Elise WoO 59
2023	Soul Tide	Ithil
2023	One.	Mizuka Nagamori
2024	Zenless Zone Zero	Piper Wheel
2025	Fatal Fury: City of the Wolves	Hotaru Futaba
2025	Blue Archive	Tachibana Hikari
2025	Honkai: Star Rail	Hysilens
2025	The Hundred Line: Last Defense Academy	Kamyuhn
2025	Wuthering Waves	Mornye
2025	Kemono Teatime	Mallow
2026	The Adventures of Elliot: The Millennium Tales	Princess Heuria
2026	The Angel Next Door Spoils Me Rotten: Memorial Vacation	Mahiru Shiina
2026	Neverness to Everness	Haniel
2026	Nekopara: Sekai Connect	Sakura
2026	Echoes of Aincrad	Stina

=== Dubbing ===
- Jurassic World: Fallen Kingdom (2025 The Cinema edition) (Maisie Lockwood (Isabella Sermon))
