= Mongol800 =

Japanese band

MONGOL800
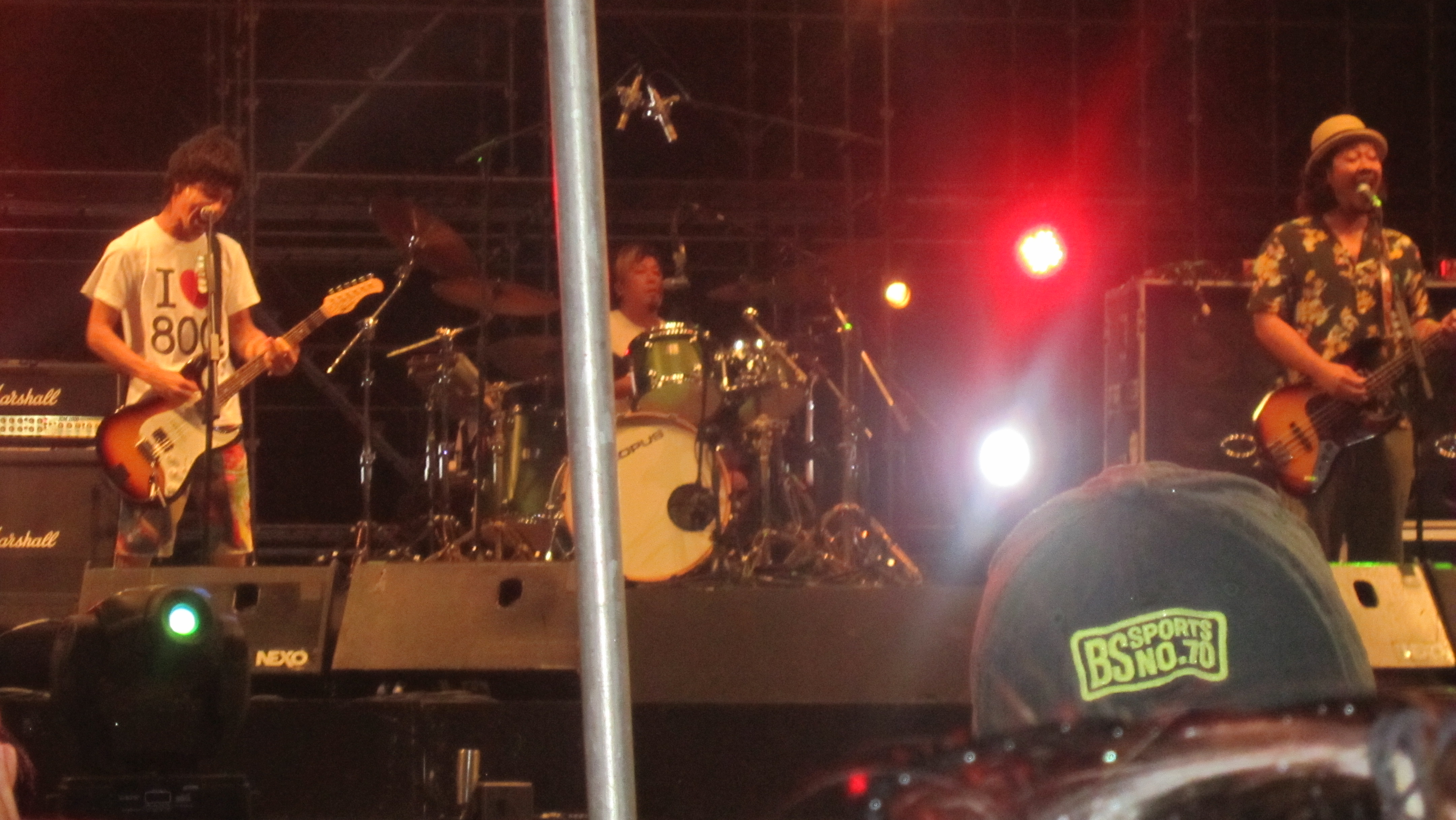
- Mongol800 performing at Busan Rock Festival, South Korea in 2011

Background information
- Also known as: Monpachi
- Origin: Okinawa, Japan
- Genres: Punk rock; pop punk; indie rock; ska punk
- Years active: 1998–present
- Label: Tissue Freak Records / High Wave
- Members: Satoshi Takazato; Kiyosaku Uezu; Takashi Gima
- Website: www.mongol800.jp

Mongol800 (モンゴル はっぴゃく, mongoru happyaku; stylized as MONGOL800) is a Japanese three-piece punk rock band from Urasoe, Okinawa, Japan, formed in 1998. The band released their first album when the members were 19. In 2001, despite low media attention, they produced a commercially-prominent second album Message, which eventually sold over two million record copies. Due to the success of the album the musicians were offered label deals from several major labels and an invitation to participate at the Kōhaku Uta Gassen which the band declined to stay independent.

Since then, they have released several albums with assorted success.

== History ==
The band was formed in summer of 1998 in their hometown, Urasoe, Okinawa while the band members were still in high school. They produced the two song "START" and "Shin Komekamin A".

They released their first album on December 7, 1999, titled Go On as You Are.

They released their second album Message on September 16, 2001. The album had sold 2 million copies by 2003, despite no media exposure.

== Band members ==
- Kiyosaku Uezu (うえず きよさく; born 1981) – bass guitar, vocals
- Takashi Gima (ぎま たかし; born 1980) – guitar
- Satoshi Takazato (たかざと さとし; born 1980) – drums

== Discography ==
=== Studio albums ===
Year	Album details	Sales
2000	Go On as You Are: Released: August 8, 2000	1,000,000
2001	Message: Released: September 16, 2001	2,782,000
2004	百々: Momo: Released: March 18, 2004	—
2006	Daniel: Released: August 8, 2006	—
2008	Etc. Works: Released: July 8, 2008	—
2009	Eight-hundreds: Released: July 8, 2009	46,128
2011	etc.works2: Released: May 18, 2011	—
2013	Good Morning Okinawa: Released: February 20, 2013	—
2015	People People: Released: August 19, 2015	—
2016	Pretty Good!!: Released: September 28, 2016	—
2023	Last Paradise: Released: July 12, 2023	—

=== EPs ===
Year	Title
2022	"Aiyaiya" (愛彌々) with WANIMA: Released: June 22, 2022
2024	"Aiyaiya 2" (愛彌々2) with WANIMA: Released: September 25, 2024

=== Singles ===
Year	Title
2003	"Yorokobi no Uta" (ヨロコビノウタ): Released: December 6, 2003
2008	"Special Thanks!!": Released: December 3, 2008
2014	"Okinawa Calling×Stand by Me": Released: June 25, 2014

=== Compilations ===
Year	Title
2000	沖縄中毒/The Pocket Full of Rumble Okinawan Addict!!
2000	Japanese Homegrown Vol.4-Skacore Collection
2001	飛薬 (Flying Drug): 沖縄中毒 Vol.2
2013	800Best: Simple Is the Best!!
