= Omni Sight Seeing =

Studio album by Haruomi Hosono
- Released: July 21, 1989
- Recorded: 1988–1989
- Studios: Magnet Studio (Tokyo); D.M.S. (Tokyo); Alfa Studio A (Tokyo); Artistic Palace (Paris)
- Genres: Ambient; electronica; world
- Length: 47:59
- Languages: Japanese; English; French; Arabic
- Labels: Epic, Light in the Attic Records (U.S. Edition)
- Producer: Haruomi Hosono

Haruomi Hosono chronology
| Endless Talking (1985) | Omni Sight Seeing (1989) | Medicine Compilation (1993) |

Omni Sight Seeing is the thirteenth studio album by Japanese musician Haruomi Hosono, released on July 21, 1989.

== Background and recording ==
This was their first studio album in four years since their last album, "Endless Talking", and their first release since moving to EPIC/SONY RECORDS.

This work was the result of sessions and collaborations with Arabian musicians, with an inclination towards the 'world music' that was gaining attention at the time.

== Track listing ==
All tracks are written by Haruomi Hosono, except where noted.

| No. | Title | Writer(s) | Length |
|---|---|---|---|
| 1. | "Esashi" (江差) (featuring Minyo Girls) | traditional | 1:50 |
| 2. | "Andadura" (featuring Amina) | | 6:23 |
| 3. | "Orgone Box" | | 6:05 |
| 4. | "Ohenro-san" (お遍路さん) (instrumental) | | 2:44 |
| 5. | "Caravan" | Irving Mills, Juan Tizol, Duke Ellington | 4:16 |
| 6. | "Retort" | | 3:33 |
| 7. | "Laugh-Gas" | Hosono, Amina Ben Mustapha, Tomoko Nunoi | 11:27 |
| 8. | "Korendor" (instrumental) | | 5:27 |
| 9. | "Pleocene" | Hosono, Keiko Hida | 6:12 |

== Music description ==
1. ESASHI
  - The title Esashi is taken from "Esashi oiwake" ("Esashi crossroads").
  - Hosono was watching NHK Nodo Jiman in 1988 and could not forget the song Esashi Oiwake sung by then 14-year-old Kimura Kasumi from Hokkaido Esashi Town, so he sought her out and recorded it a cappella.
2. ANDADURA
  - The genre is "Arab music".
  - The vocalists are the Tunisian-French singer Amina Annabi and Hosono.
3. 'ORGONE BOX'
  - The title refers to the orgone discovered by Wilhelm Reich.
  - The song is about Cloudbuster. (See Orgon for more information.)
4. OHENRO-SAN
  - The title Ohenro refers to Ohenro.
  - It contains some of the songs used in A Promise, a 1986 film directed by Yoshishige Yoshida.
5. CARAVAN
  - Hosono himself says: "A compilation of quotations, a ghost band of ghost musicians"; the names Les Paul and Duke Ellington are credited, but this is a simulation, not an actual performance and recording.
6. RETORT
  - The lyrics are included on the lyric card, but the singer himself explains, "I can't sing it very well, so I'm hoping someone will record a song version of it for me one day." He explains,.
  - A song version self-cover was included as "Retort - Vu Ja De ver." (M11) on his 2017 album Vu Jà Dé.
7. LAUGH-GAS
  - The lyrics are in French and the song is sung by "Amina Ben Mustapha".
8. KORENDOR
  - Image of "a deranged alien playing piano in the Japanese countryside", according to the man himself.
9. 'PLEOCENE'
  - The song PLEOCENE is a development of the song PLEOCINE, which was used in the 1985 film Night on the Galactic Railroad.
  - The vocals are sung by Hosono and Moro Fukuzawa.

== Personnel ==
ESASHI

- Kasumi Kimura: Main Vocal
- Masako Kawasaki : Chorus
- Masaya Honjou : Ai-no-te and Chorus
- Miharu Koshi : Backing Chorus
- Zouhir Gouja : Accordion
- Julien Weiss : Quanoon
- Hidetarou Honjou : Orientation

ANDADURA

- Amina Ben Mustapha : Arabic Vocal
- Zouhir Gouja : Accordion
- Julien Weiss : Quanoon
- Moro Fukuzawa : Chorus
- Maria Kawamura : Chorus
- Miharu Koshi : Chorus

ORGONE BOX

- Harry Hosono : Voice
- Miharu Koshi : Chorus
- TR-808 : Rhythm

OHENRO-SAN

- Harry Hosono : Prepared Piano, Sanu-kite

CARAVAN

- Duke Ellington : Piamo, Horn Session
- Les Paul : E.Guitar, Rhythm Arrangement
- Gene Klupa : Drum Solo
- Yasuaki Shimizu : Sax Solo
- Harry Hosono : Vocal in Japanese-English style
- Yasuo Kimoto : DX-7
- Miharu Koshi : Hearing

RETORT

- Harry Hosono : Celeste
- Miharu Koshi : Junior Hohner & additional Arrangement
- Kouji Ueno : Orchestrations(original for strings)

LAUGH-GAS

- Amina Ben Mustapha : Arabic Vocal
- Zouhir Gouja : Accordion
- Julien Weiss : Quanoon
- Tomoko Nunoi : French Voice
- Unknown Children : Laughing
- Miharuomi : Synthes
- TR-808 : Rhythm
- E.M.S : Bass

KORENDOR

- Hosonoid : Piano Solo
- Evansoid : Orchestration

PLEOCENE

- Harry Hosono : Vocal, Kaya-gum
- Moro Fukuzawa : Chorus
- Masako Kawasaki : Chorus
- Masaya Honjou : Chorus
- Miharu Koshi : Electric Piano
- Hidetarou Honjou : Chorus Arrangement
