= Roland TR-909 =

Drum machine

TR-909
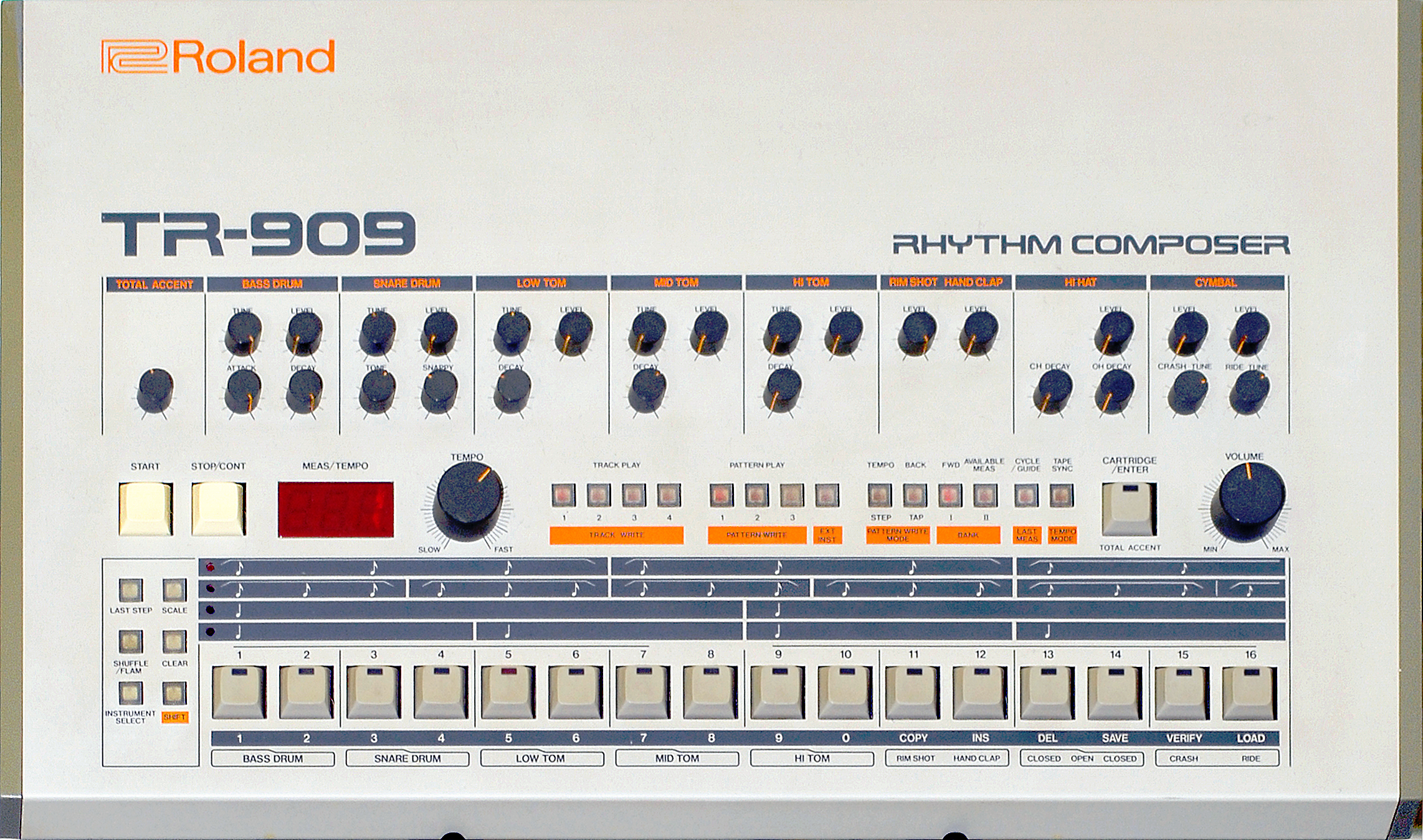
- TR-909 front panel
- Manufacturer: Roland
- Dates: 1983–1985
- Price: $1,195 USD £999 GBP ¥189,000 JPY

Technical specifications
- Polyphony: 11 voices
- Timbrality: Monophonic
- Oscillator: 4
- LFO: 9
- Synthesis type: Analog subtractive and digital sample-based subtractive
- Filter: 34/25db resonant lowpass filter
- Aftertouch expression: No
- Velocity expression: Yes
- Storage memory: 1232 patterns, 23 songs
- Effects: Individual level, tuning, attack, decay, and tone controls for some sounds

Input/output
- Keyboard: 16 pattern keys
- External control: MIDI in/out & DIN sync in
- Audio sample: 19

The Roland TR-909 Rhythm Composer, commonly known as the 909, is a drum machine introduced by Roland Corporation in 1983, succeeding the TR-808. It was the first Roland drum machine to use samples for some sounds, and the first with MIDI functionality, allowing it to synchronize with other devices.

The 909 was a commercial failure, as users preferred the more realistic sounds of competing products such as the LinnDrum. Roland ceased production after one year, having built 10,000 units. However, it became popular on the used market and influenced the development of electronic dance music genres such as techno, house and acid house.

== Development ==
The TR-909 was designed by Tadao Kikumoto, who had also led development on Roland's previous drum machine, the TR-808, and designed the Roland TB-303 synthesizer. Makoto Muroi was a chief engineer, the software was developed by Atsushi Hoshiai and the voice circuits were developed by Yoshiro Oue.

The 909 was the first Roland drum machine to use samples, for its crash, ride and hi-hat sounds. Hoshiai recorded his own drum kit for the cymbals, using a pair of Paiste and Zildjian hi-hat cymbals for the hi-hat and a Paiste crash for the crash and ride sounds. The cymbals were recorded in the Roland office after the employees had left for its natural reverberation. Hoshiai sampled them in 6-bit and edited the waveform on a computer with a CP/M-80 operating system. No equalization or compression was applied.

Other sounds are generated with analog synthesis. According to a Roland representative, the engineers felt that samples had some disadvantages and so opted for a combination of sampled and analog sounds.

== Sounds and features ==
A house pattern featuring a four-on-the-floor bass drum plus cymbal, claps, hi-hats and rimshots

Whereas the 808 is known for its "boomy" bass, the 909 sounds aggressive and "punchy". It has 11 percussion voices and offers sounds for bass drum, snare, toms, rimshot, clap, crash cymbal, ride cymbal and hi-hat (open and closed). It omits the clave, cowbell, maracas, and conga sounds from the 808.

The bass drum has controls for attack and decay. The snare has controls for tone and "snappy", which adjusts the amount of the snare wire sound. As the clap and snare are generated via the same noise source, they produce a phasing effect when played together. The sequencer can chain up to 96 patterns into songs of up to 896 measures, and offers controls including shuffle and flam. Users can add accents to beats.

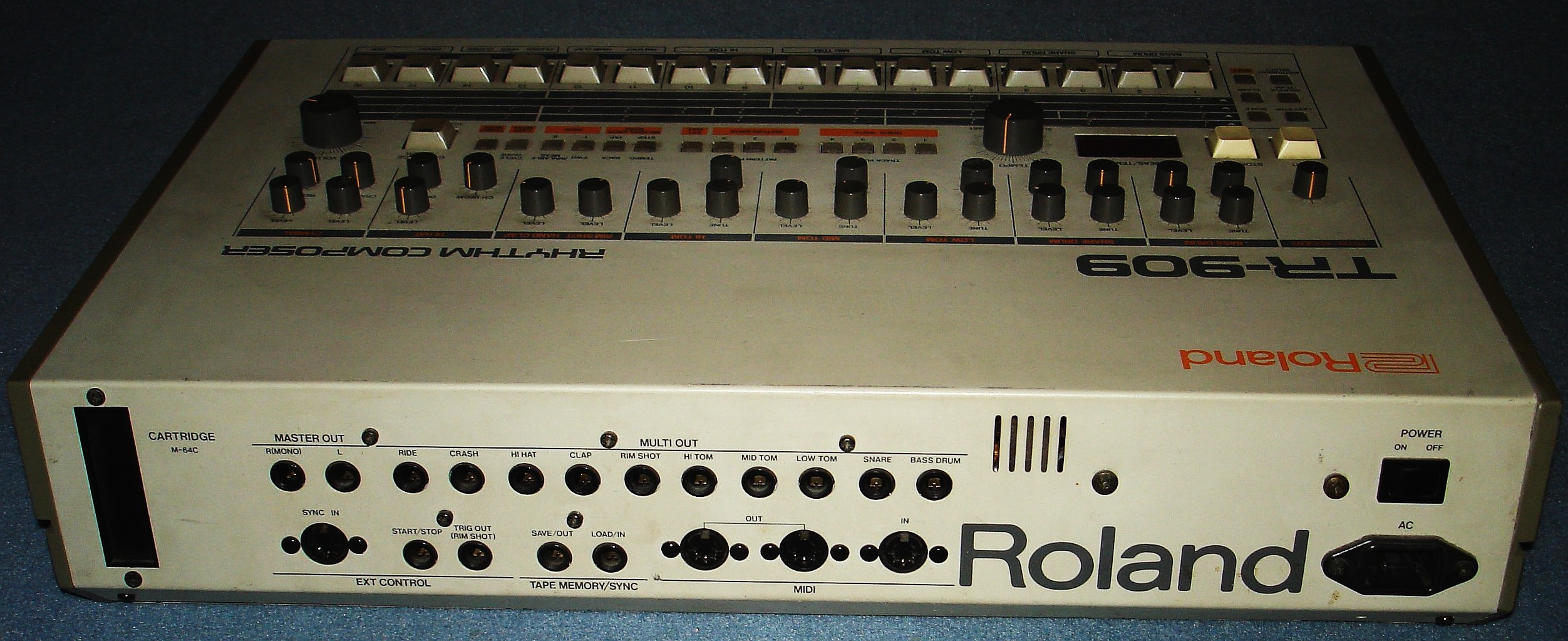
909 rear view

The 909 was the first Roland drum machine to use MIDI, allowing it to synchronize with other MIDI devices, or for sounds to be triggered by an external MIDI controller for wider dynamic range. Older Roland machines can be synchronized via its DIN sync port. Roland changed elements of the 909 in later revisions, correcting problems and adjusting sounds. Some users modify their machines to match sounds from earlier revisions.

== Release ==
The 909 was released in 1983 and retailed for $1,195 USD, equivalent to $3,863 in 2025. It attracted industry interest as the first Roland instrument to use sampled sounds.

In its review, Electronics & Music Maker found the 909 easier to use than the 808 and felt it offered the best analog drum sounds on the market. It concluded that it offered a good combination of analog and sampled sounds and that the addition of MIDI brought the 909 "as up to date as it needs to be". One Two Testing found the 909 "gloriously easy to use", but felt it was overpriced and "still sounds like a drum machine, instead of a machine playing drums ... It lacks the authenticity of real sounds for studio work."

The 909 was a commercial failure, as users preferred the more realistic sampled sounds of competing products such as the LinnDrum. Roland ceased production after one year, having built 10,000 units.

== Legacy ==
Whereas the 808 was important in the development of hip hop, the 909, alongside the TB-303 synthesizer, influenced dance music such as techno, house and acid. According to Gordon Reid of Sound on Sound, "Like the TR-808 before it, nobody could have predicted the reverence in which the 909 would eventually come to be held." September 9 is celebrated as "909 day".

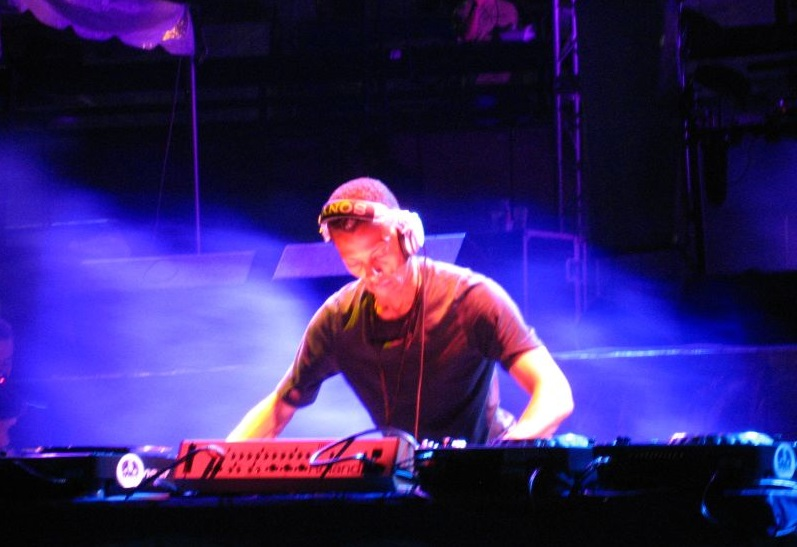
Jeff Mills performing with a 909 in Detroit in 2007

In 1984, the 909 was used in records including the city pop album Sailing Blaster by Hiroshi Sato, the electronic album S-F-X by Haruomi Hosono, and the EP Remission by the industrial band Skinny Puppy. Another early 909 user was Kurtis Mantronik, who used it on records by his hip-hop group Mantronix and records he produced such as Back to the Old School (1986) by Just-Ice.

In the late 1980s, the 909 was popularized by Chicago house and Detroit techno producers such as Derrick May, Frankie Knuckles and Jeff Mills, who bought second-hand units. DJ Sneak said "every Chicago producer" used it. Mixmag described Mills as the "master" of the 909. MusicRadar described his performance in the documentary Exhibitionist 2 as "one of the most impressive solo drum machine performances ever put to tape" and "the greatest Roland TR-909 moment ever". Mills said the 909's design made it possible to "play" rather than just program it, using the tuning controls to imitate the feel of a live drummer. The 909 was used by Adamski on his 1990 single "Killer".

Though it remains less important to hip-hop than the 808, the 909 was used by hip-hop acts including Boogie Down Productions, Ultramagnetic MCs, Jazzy Jeff and the Fresh Prince and Public Enemy. In the early 1990s, the Japanese composer Yuzo Koshiro incorporated samples of the 909 in his soundtracks for the Streets of Rage games. Daft Punk used it on tracks such as "Revolution 909" from their 1997 album Homework.

The 909 was adopted by pop musicians such as Madonna, Pet Shop Boys and Phil Collins, and by rock and alternative musicians. Mark Bell used it to create "militaristic" percussion for Björk's 1997 song "Hunter". Radiohead used it on "Videotape" from their 2007 album In Rainbows, and the Radiohead members Thom Yorke and Jonny Greenwood have used it in live performances. Electronic artists such as Kirk Degiorgio and Cristian Vogel created sample libraries by recording their friends' machines.

The 909 was succeeded in 1984 by the TR-707, which uses samples for all its sounds. In 2017, Roland released the TR-09, a smaller version of the 909 with additional features. Hoshiai said he was proud that the 909 had created new musical forms, which he had not expected. As of 2024, he still used the cymbals he sampled for the 909 in his jazz band.
