= Tropical Dandy =

Studio album by Haruomi Hosono
- Released: June 25, 1975
- Recorded: Crown Studio; Akasaka, Minato, Tokyo
- Genres: Jazz fusion; exotica
- Length: 34:22
- Labels: PANAM, CROWN
- Producer: Haruomi Hosono

Haruomi Hosono chronology
Hosono House (1973)	Tropical Dandy (1975)	Bon Voyage co. (1976)

Singles from Tropical Dandy
- 1. ""Silk Road"/"Honey Moon"" Released: 1975

Tropical Dandy is the second solo studio album by Japanese musician Haruomi Hosono, released on June 25, 1975.

== Album ==
This album begins the tropical style which Hosono features very prevalently in the beginning of his career in following albums such as Bon Voyage co. and Paraiso. Also, it features performances from "Caramel Mama" (who had, by this point, changed their name to "Tin Pan Alley"). This album was reissued as part of a box set with bonus tracks taken from Tin Pan Alley albums by Crown decades later.

Professional ratings
Review scores
Source	Rating
The Wire	favorable

== Track listing ==
All tracks are written by Haruomi Hosono, except where noted.

No.	Title	Writer(s)	Length
1.	"Chattanooga Choo Choo"	Mack Gordon (English lyrics), Aloysio de Oliveira (Portuguese lyrics), Harry Warren (music)	2:49
2.	"Hurricane Dorothy"		5:46
3.	"Silk Road" (絹街道 Kinukaidō)		3:32
4.	"Tropical Night" (熱帯夜 Nettaiya)		4:55
5.	"Peking Duck" (北京DUCK Pekin Duck)		2:36
6.	"Drifting Chronicle" (漂流記 Hyōryūki)		3:08
7.	"Honey Moon"		2:37
8.	"Three o'Clock Lullaby" (三時の子守唄 Sanji no Komori Uta)		2:31
9.	"Three o'Clock Lullaby" (三時の子守唄 Sanji no Komori Uta) (instrumental)		2:26
10.	"Drifting Chronicle" (漂流記 Hyōryūki) (instrumental)		4:02

Harry Hosono Crown Years 1974–1977 box set bonus tracks
No.	Title	Originally from	Length
11.	"Choo Choo Gatagoto'75" (CHOO CHOO ガタゴト'75)	Caramel Mama, 1975	3:17
12.	"Yellow Magic Carnival"	Caramel Mama, 1975	3:34
13.	"Rose and Beast" (薔薇と野獣 Bara to Yajū)	Tin Pan Alley 2, 1977	4:13
14.	"Ballad of Aya" (アヤのバラード Aya no Barādo)	Caramel Mama, 1975	1:37
15.	"Theme of "Evening Primrose" Part 1〜Drifting Chronicle" ("宵待草"のテーマ Part 1〜漂流記 "Yoimachigusa" no Tēma Part 1〜Hyōryūki)	Yoimachigusa (soundtrack), 1975	4:09
16.	"Theme of "Evening Primrose" Part 2〜Drifting Chronicle" ("宵待草"のテーマ Part 2〜漂流記 "Yoimachigusa" no Tēma Part 2〜Hyōryūki)	Yoimachigusa (soundtrack), 1975	1:36

== Album cover ==
The album's cover is a parody of the sailor-themed packaging of Player's Navy Cut cigarettes, similar to the 1969 Procol Harum album, A Salty Dog. The quotation marks around Hosono's surname refer to the "medium" version of the cigarette. The cover also portrays a ship resembling the RMS Titanic, which Hosono's grandfather, Masabumi, infamously escaped the sinking of on her maiden voyage.

== Personnel ==
- Haruomi Hosono – Bass, Vocals, Mellotron, Marimba, Guitar (Acoustic & Electric), Clavinet, Cowbell, Whistle, Backing Vocals/Choir, Production, Liner notes
- Masataka Matsutoya – Piano, Hammond organ, String Arrangements
- Shigeru Suzuki – Electric Guitar, Backing Vocals/Choir
- Tatsuo Hayashi – Drums, Percussion
- Hiroki Komazawa – Pedal steel guitar
- Hiroshi Satō – Piano, Clavinet
- Ginji Itō – Electric Guitar
- Motoya Hamaguchi – Percussion
- Makoto Yano – Strings, Horn (Wind and Brass) & String Arrangements
- Minako Yoshida – Duet Vocals, Backing Vocals/Choir
- Makoto Kubota – Backing Vocals/Choir, Scat Vocals
- Teruyuki Fukushima – Trumpet
- Masayuki Kuniyoshi – Flute
- Yōji Yamashita – Ukulele
- Clare Francis – Voice
- Kayo Ito, Taeko Ōnuki & Kōsetsu Minami – Backing Vocals/Choir
- Kazuhiro Ichihashi – Backing Vocals/Choir, Assistant Engineering
- Shincihi Furuzaki – Re-mixing
- Yasuo Yagi – Cover and Back Tropical Artwork, Concept Art
- Michiko Oshima – Liner Artwork
- Takumi Uchida – Photography

== See also ==
- 1975 in Japanese music
