= S-F-X =

Studio album by Haruomi Hosono with Friends Of Earth
- Released: 16 December 1984
- Genres: Electronic; ambient
- Length: 33:10
- Labels: Teichiku; Non Standard
- Producer: Haruomi Hosono

Haruomi Hosono chronology
Hana ni Mizu (1984)	S-F-X (1984)	Coincidental Music (1985)

S-F-X (stylized with interpuncts as S·F·X) is the eighth solo studio album by Japanese musician Haruomi Hosono. Released on December 16, 1984, the album is Hosono's first solo album after Yellow Magic Orchestra disbanded. Credited also is "Friends of Earth", as Hosono would later form a band with this name. The album is the first album released by label Non Standard, a record label created between Hosono and Teichiku Records to release the technopop/hip-hop styled material he worked on.

The 1988, 1993 and 2001 reissues of S-F-X contain tracks from Non-Standard Mixture, an EP created by Hosono the same year as the album.

== Production ==
Hosono produced the album with the help of engineer Yasuhiko Terada. The album utilized several new electronic musical instruments shortly after they released, including the Roland TR-909 drum machine, the Yamaha DX7 digital synthesizer, the Korg SDD‑1000 digital delay unit (which he used as a sampler), and the Kurzweil K250 sampler. Like his earlier album Philharmony (1982), Hosono also utilized his earlier Roland MC-4 Microcomposer music sequencer and LinnDrum and Roland TR-808 drum machines. He also made use of MIDI, soon after the technology was introduced.

For the album, Hosono experimented with various new concepts and techniques. For example, he experimented with 32-beat rhythms, which went beyond the standard 8‑beat rhythms of rock music and even the complex rhythms of funk, disco, jazz fusion and hip hop at the time. Hosono also made heavy use of sampling and loops, building on his earlier pioneering work with YMO's Technodelic (1981) and his solo album Philharmony, which went on to revolutionize music production. He produced several tracks such as "Alternative 3" using improvisation, stating he "played the turntable and randomly sampled it" with the SDD-1000 and then "made loops of the sounds" he "accidentally recorded, and layered the sounds while listening" to them.

The album incorporates hip hop elements, which was influenced by Hosono meeting American hip hop pioneer Afrika Bambaataa, who was himself a fan influenced by Hosono's earlier pioneering work with YMO. They both demonstrated their work and shared some ideas. Hosono had thought the Roland TR-808, which he had been using since its release in 1980, was already used to its fullest by YMO, before he saw Bambaataa using the TR-808 in a fresh way along with the Korg SDD-1000 delay unit. Meanwhile, Hosono demonstrated his new experimental 32-beat rhythms, which impressed Bambaataa. Up until then, YMO had made heavy use of numerous electronic instruments, but after Hosono saw Bambaataa produce similar results with fewer, cheaper instruments, Hosono adopted a similar approach.

== Reception ==
Shy Clara Thompson of Pitchfork gave the album's 2021 re-release a positive review. She called it a "wildly creative" album, praising its innovation and eclecticism, particularly the song "Strange Love" which she called "a triumphant pop opus that feels like the logical step forward from YMO" with its "funky melody and Hosnono’s smooth baritone underpin alien-sounding synth" likely influenced by his earlier work on the album Video Game Music (1984).

== Track listing ==
=== Vinyl/Cassette Version ===
All tracks are written by Haruomi Hosono, except "Body Snatchers" and "Strange Love", with lyrics translated by Peter Barakan.

Side A
No.	Title	Length
1.	"Body Snatchers"	5:49
2.	"Androgena"	4:52
3.	"SFX" (instrumental)	5:54
Total length:		16:35

Side B
No.	Title	Length
4.	"Strange Love"	5:52
5.	"Alternative 3" (第3の選択 Dai San no Sentaku) (instrumental)	5:08
6.	"Dark Side of the Star" (地球の夜にむけての夜想曲 Chikyū no Yoru ni Mukete no Yasōkyoku) (instrumental)	5:35
Total length:		16:35

=== CD Version ===
No.	Title	Length
1.	"Non-Standard Mixture" (instrumental)	7:04
2.	"Body Snatchers" (Special Mix)	5:49
3.	"Androgena"	4:52
4.	"SFX" (instrumental)	5:54
5.	"Strange Love"	5:52
6.	"Alternative 3" (第3の選択 Dai San no Sentaku) (instrumental)	5:08
7.	"Dark Side of the Star" (地球の夜にむけての夜想曲 Chikyū no Yoru ni Mukete no Yasōkyoku) (instrumental)	5:35
8.	"Medium Composition; #1" (instrumental)	1:13
9.	"Medium Composition; #2" (instrumental)	2:11
10.	"3・6・9" (instrumental)	3:48
Total length:		47:26

== See also ==
- 1984 in Japanese music

== Personnel ==
- Haruomi Hosono – vocals, lyrics, synthesizer, engineer
- Miharu Koshi – vocals
- Curtis Knapp – vocals
- Makoto Kubota – vocals
- Sandii – vocals
- Yasuhiko Terada – engineer
- Takashi Itoh – engineer
- Matsutoshi Nishimura – bass
