= Hosono House =

Studio album by Haruomi Hosono
- Released: May 25, 1973; October 3, 2012 (Bellwood 40th Anniversary Collection re-issue)
- Recorded: 15 February–16 March 1973; HOSONO HOUSE, 11–36; Unoki, Sayama, Saitama
- Genre: Folk rock
- Length: 31:33
- Language: Japanese
- Labels: Bellwood; KING; Vivid Sound; Light in the Attic Records
- Producer: Haruomi Hosono

Haruomi Hosono chronology
Hosono House (1973)	Tropical Dandy (1975)

Singles from Hosono House
- 1. ""Koi wa Momoiro"/"Fuku ha Uchi Oni ha Soto"" Released: September 25, 1973

Hosono House is the debut solo studio album by Japanese musician Haruomi Hosono. Released on May 25, 1973, the album was released after the break up of Hosono's former band, Happy End.

== Background and recording ==
Hosono recorded House in his residence of Amerikamura, an American-styled neighborhood located in the city of Sayama. The album was recorded for five hours every afternoon in a 144 square feet (13.4 m^{2}) large bedroom with a 16-track mixing console in his living room. The instruments were recorded unprocessed from the amplifiers in a small room, leading to the album's unique sound.

Besides Hosono, this album also features performances by the group "Caramel Mama" (featuring Hosono's fellow Happy End member Shigeru Suzuki). Hosono wanted to emulate The Band's Music from Big Pink and James Taylor's One Man Dog. With this album, recording equipment technology had evolved enough for domestic recordings of good quality to be feasible, and going to the center of the city to reach a recording studio was somewhat inconvenient.

== Track listing ==
All tracks are written by Haruomi Hosono, except "Owari no Kisetsu", with music by Hosono and lyrics by Mondo Uno ('Mondo Uno' is an alias of Hosono); "Fuyu Koe" & "Jūsho Futei Mushoku Teishūnyū", written by Hosono with horns arranged by Kinji Yoshino and "Party", with music by Hosono and lyrics by Ryōko Suzuki & Yasushi Nakayama.

No.	Title	Length
1.	"Rock-a-Bye My Baby" (ろっか・ばい・まい・べいびい Rokka Bai Mai Beibī)	3:15
2.	"Boku wa Chotto" (僕は一寸)	3:52
3.	"Choo Choo Gatagoto" (CHOO CHOO ガタゴト)	3:25
4.	"Owari no Kisetsu" (終わりの季節)	3:12
5.	"Fuyu Koe" (冬越え)	3:15
6.	"Party" (パーティー Pātī)	2:02
7.	"Fuku wa Uchi Oni wa Soto" (福は内 鬼は外)	2:28
8.	"Jūsho Futei Mushoku Teishūnyū" (住所不定無職低収入)	2:35
9.	"Koi wa Momoiro" (恋は桃色)	2:47
10.	"Rose and Beast" (薔薇と野獣 Bara to Yajū)	4:24
11.	"Aiaigasa" (相合傘)	0:18
Total length:		31:33

== Personnel ==
- Haruomi Hosono – Bass, Guitar, Flat Mandolin, Vocal, Melodica, Thumb piano (on "Party"), Piano (on "Party"), Horn (Wind and Brass) Arrangements, Production, Sony TC-9400
- Masataka Matsutoya – Piano, Fender Rhodes, Accordion
- Shigeru Suzuki – Electric guitar
- Tatsuo Hayashi – Drums, Percussion
- Hiroki Komazawa – Steel guitar
- Kinji Yoshino – Horn Arrangements, Engineering, Re-Mix Engineering
- Masaki Nomura – Engineering

Production

- Shinzo Ishiura, WIND CORPORATION – Management
- Ritsu Kamimura – Transportation
- Misako Hosono – Cooking
- Mitsunori Miura (for BELLWOOD RECORDS) – Executive Production
- Masahiro Nogami – Photography
- WORK SHOP MU!! – Art Direction
- VERANSKY MIKKO MOKKO MINAKO, YAMAZAKI & Neighbour Foods – Special Thanks
- CITY MUSIC CORPORATION – Publishing
- ALFA MUSIC – Publishing for "Owari no Kisetsu"
- SHINKO MUSIC – Publishing for "Aiaigasa"

Reissue staff

- Mitsunori Miura – Supervision
- Ēji Ogura – Auxiliary Supervision
- Masakazu Kitanaka – Liner Notes
- Junichi Yamada – Liner Notes Editing
- Hiroyuki Tsuji – Remastering Engineering
- Approach – Design
- Junichi Yamashita – Design Coordination
- Katsumi Miyata & Jōwa Honda – A&R

== Popular culture ==
Harry Styles explained how he came up with the title for his 2022 album Harry's House: "The album is named after Haruomi Hosono, he had an album in the '70s called Hosono's House, and I spent that chunk in Japan; I heard that record and I was like 'I love that.[...] It'd be really fun to make a record called Harry's House'."

== See also ==
- 1973 in Japanese music
