= Tadao Kikumoto =

Japanese industrial designer

Tadao Kikumoto (菊本忠男, Kikumoto Tadao) is Roland's senior managing director and head of its R&D center. He was the chief engineer of the Roland TR-808 (1980) drum machine, and then designed the TB-303 (1981) bass synthesizer and TR-909 (1983) drum machine. He was also part of the team that developed MIDI, for which he received the MIDI Lifetime Achievement Award from the MIDI Association in 2024.

== Roland TR-808 ==
=== Design ===
The Roland TR-808, a programmable drum machine, was launched in 1980. The TR-808 included unique artificial percussion sounds, such as “the hum kick, the ticky snare, the tishy hi-hats (open and closed) and the spacey cowbell.”

The machine is particularly noted for its powerful booming bass drum sound, built from a combination of a bridged T-network sine oscillator, a low-pass filter, and a voltage-controlled amplifier. The bass drum decay control allows the user to lengthen the sound, creating uniquely low frequencies that flatten slightly over long periods, which can be used to create basslines or bass drops. It was the first drum machine with the ability to program an entire percussion track of a song from beginning to end, complete with breaks and rolls. The machine includes volume knobs for each voice, multiple audio outputs, and a DIN sync port (a precursor to MIDI) to synchronize with other devices via the Digital Control Bus (DCB) interface, considered groundbreaking at the time. The machine has three trigger outputs, used to synchronize/control synthesizers and other equipment.

=== Impact ===
The TR-808 would become a fixture of the burgeoning underground dance, electro, house, techno, R&B and hip-hop genres, mainly because of their relatively low cost and the unique character of their analogue-generated sounds. It was first utilized by Japanese electronic music band Yellow Magic Orchestra in the year of its release, after which it would gain worldwide popularity with Marvin Gaye's "Sexual Healing" and Afrikaa Bambaataa's "Planet Rock" in 1982.

The track informed the development of pop-oriented electronic music and of hip hop music, and genres including electro, Miami bass, and Detroit techno. The 808 was instrumental to the origins of house and techno, and remains a staple of electronic dance music.

Producer Rick Rubin and hip hop group Original Concept popularized the technique of lengthening the bass drum decay and tuning it to different pitches to create basslines. The technique was adopted by Miami bass producers, who also used the 808 to produce a bass drop, which has since been incorporated into a number of hip hop and dance genres, either produced by an 808 or using a sample of an 808 bass drop. The Bomb Squad popularized the use of samplers to manipulate the 808 bass, which became common in hip hop music. Dynamix II popularized this technique in dance music, which has since used the 808 sub-bass extensively, in genres such as trap, deep house and drum and bass. 808 samples were the basis for jungle and drum and bass, which developed from British producers using samplers to manipulate 808 sounds.

The analogue-based Roland machines have endured over time. The beats of the TR-808 have since been widely featured in popular music, and can be heard on countless recordings up to the present day. Because of its bass and long decay, the kick drum from the TR-808 has also featured as a bass line in various genres such as hip hop and drum and bass. Since the mid-1980s, the TR-808 and TR-909 have been used on more hit records than any other drum machines, attaining an iconic status within the music industry.

== Roland TR-909 ==
While the TR-808 was fully analogue synthesis-based, the Roland TR-909 combined analogue synthesis with digital sampling. The TR-909 was also notable for being the first MIDI-equipped drum machine. In turn, the TR-909 was succeeded in 1984 by the Roland TR-707, which was entirely based on digital sampling.

The TR-909 eventually came to be held in reverence by music producers, hip hop music DJs and beatmakers, and techno and other electronic dance music-style DJs. Much like the TR-808's importance to hip hop, the TR-909 holds a similar important for dance music, such as techno and house music.

== Roland TB-303 ==
Tadao Kikumoto's invention of the TB-303 in 1981 has been listed by The Guardian in 2011 as one of the 50 key events in the history of dance music, for its key role in the foundation of acid house. The article described it as one of the "first boxes to define the sound of electronic dance music."
