= Paraiso (Haruomi Hosono album) =

Studio album by Harry Hosono and The Yellow Magic Band
- Released: April 25, 1978
- Recorded: December 1977 – January 1978
- Studios: Alfa Studio "A", Shibaura, Minato, Tokyo; Crown Studio, Akasaka, Minato, Tokyo ("Asatoya Yunta")
- Genres: City pop; jazz fusion; exotica; synth-pop; soft rock; proto-chillwave
- Length: 34:37
- Labels: Alfa; Sony Music Direct
- Producer: Haruomi Hosono

Haruomi Hosono chronology
Bon Voyage co. (1976)	Paraiso (1978)	Cochin Moon (1978)

Paraiso (はらいそ, Haraiso) is the fourth solo studio album by Japanese musician Haruomi Hosono. Released on April 25, 1978, it was Hosono's first album to feature Yellow Magic Band (later Yellow Magic Orchestra) and has been described as a city pop, synth-pop, exotica, soft rock and proto-chillwave. This album continues the tropical style featured in Tropical Dandy and Bon Voyage co., while being influenced by the music of Hawaii and Okinawa, incorporating electronic sounds that would be later developed on Hosono's and YMO's careers. YMO, The Yellow Magic Band at this point in time, was composed of Tin Pan Alley members and studio musicians, such as Hosono's former Happy End bandmate Shigeru Suzuki and future YMO members Ryuichi Sakamoto (who would later perform an altered version of "Asatoya Yunta" in his solo career) and Yukihiro Takahashi, as well as guitarist Hirofumi Tokutake (who would later perform in Technodon and Wild Sketch Show).

== Track listing ==
All tracks are written by Haruomi Hosono, except "Japanese Rhumba" by Gerald F. Miller (credited as 'G. Miller'); "Asatoya Yunta", a traditional Okinawan song and "Fujiyama Mama", written by Jack Hammer with lyrics translated by Seiichi Ida and additional lyrics written by Hosono

No.	Title	Length
1.	"Tokio Rush"	3:31
2.	"Shimendōka" (四面道歌)	4:44
3.	"Japanese Rhumba"	3:34
4.	"Asatoya Yunta" (安里屋ユンタ)	2:15
5.	"Fujiyama Mama"	2:50
6.	"Femme Fatale" (妖婦 Yōfu)	5:00
7.	"Shambhala Signal" (シャンバラ通信 Shanbara Tsūshin)	3:36
8.	"Worry Beads"	4:28
9.	"Paraiso" (はらいそ Haraiso)	4:35

== Personnel ==
=== Tokio Rush (東京ラッシュ) ===
- Haruomi Hosono - Vocals, Electric Bass, Electric Guitar, Yamaha CS-80 Synthesizer
- Taeko Onuki, Tokyo Shyness Boys - Backing Vocals
- Hiroshi Sato - Acoustic Piano
- Ryuichi Sakamoto - Yamaha Polyphonic Synth, Yamaha CS-80 Synthesizer
- Tatsuo Hayashi - Drums
- Nobu Saito - Percussion

=== Shimendoka (四面道歌) ===
- Haruomi Hosono - Vocals, Electric Bass, Yamaha CP-30 Synthesizer, Steel Drums
- Shigeru Suzuki - Electric Guitar
- Hiroshi Sato - Fender Rhodes Electric Piano, Yamaha CS-80 Synthesizer
- Tatsuo Hayashi - Drums
- Nobu Saito - Percussion

=== Japanese Rhumba (ジャパニーズ・ルンバ) ===
- Tadashi Kamayatsu - Lead Vocals
- Haruomi Hosono - Backing Vocals, Electric Bass, Acoustic Piano, Yamaha CS-80 Synthesizer, Percussion
- Tomoko Kawada - Backing Vocals
- Hiroshi Sato - Yamaha CS-80 Synthesizer
- Tatsuo Hayashi - Drums
- Nobu Saito - Percussion

=== Asatoya Yunta (安里屋ユンタ) ===
- Haruomi Hosono - Vocals, Electric Bass, Marimba, Percussion, Roland Synthesizer
- Tomoko Kawada - Co-Lead Vocals
- Shigeru Suzuki - Electric Guitar
- Hiroshi Sato - Acoustic Piano
- Tatsuo Hayashi - Drums
- Motoya Hamaguchi - Percussion

=== Fujiyama Mama ===
- Haruomi Hosono - Vocals, Electric Bass, Electric Guitar, Fender Rhodes Electric Piano, Drums, Acoustic Piano, Synthesizers, Percussion
- Staff - Clapping

=== Femme Fatale ===
- Haruomi Hosono - Vocals, Electric Bass, Yamaha CP-30 Synthesizer, Marimba, Sounds (Birds)
- Hirobumi Tokutake - Electric Guitar
- Ryuichi Sakamoto - Fender Rhodes Electric Piano, Acoustic Piano, Yamaha CS-80 Synthesizer
- Yukihiro Takahashi - Drums
- Motoya Hamaguchi - Percussion

=== Shambhala Signal (シャンバラ通信) ===
- Haruomi Hosono - Gong, Ace Tone Rhythm Producer Drum Machine

=== Worry Beads (ウォーリー・ビーズ) ===
- Haruomi Hosono - Vocals, Electric Bass, Electric Guitar, Acoustic Piano, Synthesizer
- Morio Agata, Taeko Onuki, Tokyo Shyness Boys - Backing Vocals
- Hiroshi Sato - Yamaha CS-80 Synthesizer
- Masahiro Takekawa - Violin
- Tatsuo Hayashi - Drums
- Nobu Saito - Percussion

=== Paraiso (Haraiso) (はらいそ) ===
- Haruomi Hosono - Vocals, Electric Bass, Electric Guitar, Marimba, Percussion, Whistle, Sounds (Wasa-Wasa Sound, Foot Steps)
- Hiroshi Sato - Yamaha CP-30 Synthesizer
- Ryuichi Sakamoto - Yamaha CS-30 Synthesizer, ARP Odyssey Synthesizer
- Tatsuo Hayashi - Drums
- Nobu Saito - Percussion

== See also ==
- 1978 in Japanese music
