= Cochin Moon =

1978 album by Haruomi Hosono

Studio album by Hosono & Yokoo
- Released: September 21, 1978
- Genres: Electronic; psychedelia; experimental
- Length: 42:47
- Label: KING
- Producers: Haruomi Hosono; Tadanori Yokoo (Executive); Tsunehiro Motoyoshi; Tadao Takakuwa

Haruomi Hosono chronology
Paraiso (1978)	Cochin Moon (1978)	Philharmony (1982)

Cochin Moon (コチンの月, Kochin no Tsuki) is the fifth solo studio album by Japanese musician Haruomi Hosono. Released on September 21, 1979, Cochin Moon was initially intended as a collaboration with illustrator Tadanori Yokoo, who traveled to India alongside Hosono (as part of a group) for inspiration; Yokoo ended up only drawing the cover, having contracted a stomach illness during the trip, rendering this as a Hosono solo album.

Cochin Moon was conceptually written as the soundtrack of a non-existent Bollywood film, a trait inspired by the artists' trip. The album includes performances by Tin Pan Alley keyboardist Hiroshi Satō, Yellow Magic Orchestra member Ryuichi Sakamoto, and Hideki Matsutake. Despite being Hosono's first completely electronic solo album (at the time YMO's debut was still being recorded, making this Hosono's first electronic album to be released), the exotica feel of Hosono's previous solo work is still present. The first half of the album (named after an Indian hotel that the group was in for the trip, a picture of the hotel's front appears in the back of the album's packaging) consists of three thematically themed songs, the second half of the album (and Hosono's keyboard performance) is credited to "Shuka Nishihara" (西原朱夏), a pseudonym Hosono created as a play on Hakushū Kitahara's pseudonym.

== Track listing ==
All tracks are written by Haruomi Hosono/"Shuka Nishihara".

Side A: Hotel Malabar (ホテル・マラバル, Hoteru Marabaru)
No.	Title	Length
1.	"Ground Floor···Triangle Circuit on the Sea-Forest" (一階・・・海の三角形 Ikkai···Umi no Sankakkei)	2:28
2.	"Upper Floor···Moving Triangle" (二階・・・動く三角形 Nikkai···Ugoku Sankakkei)	8:45
3.	"Roof Garden···Revel Attack" (屋上・・・レベル・アタック Okujō···Reberu Atakku)	8:58

Side B
No.	Title	Length
4.	"Hepatitis" (肝炎 Kan'en)	4:43
5.	"Hum Ghar Sajan" (ハム・ガラ・サジャン Hamu Gara Sajan)	8:50
6.	"Madam Consul General of Madras" (マドラス総領事夫人 Madorasu Sōryōji Fujin)	9:04

== Personnel ==
- Haruomi Hosono/"Shuka Nishihara" – synthesizers, production
- Hiroshi Satō & Ryuichi Sakamoto – keyboards
- Hideki Matsutake – computer programming
- Seiichi Chiba & Kunio Tsukamoto – engineering
- Humio Ozawa – assistant engineering
- Mitsuo Koike – reissue mastering

== See also ==
- 1978 in Japanese music
