= Coincidental Music =

Studio album by Haruomi Hosono
- Released: 21 August 1985
- Genre: Electronic
- Length: 36:26
- Label: Teichiku Records

Haruomi Hosono chronology
S-F-X (1984)	Coincidental Music (1985)	Mercuric Dance (1985)

Coincidental Music is the ninth studio album by Japanese musician Haruomi Hosono. Released on August 21, 1985, it consists of a selection of soundtracks composed at the time for installations, commercials, TV, films, and for companies like Yakult and Shiseido. The album was re-released in 1996.

== Track listing ==
All tracks are written by Haruomi Hosono.

No.	Title	Length
1.	"Lichtenstein's"	0:31
2.	"Pietro Germi"	5:30
3.	"Normandia"	2:26
4.	"The Man Of China"	1:50
5.	"Sayokoskatti"	4:45
6.	"Mazinger "H""	3:14
7.	"The Plan"	0:31
8.	"Nokto De La Galaksia Fervojo"	1:31
9.	"George Don"	1:01
10.	"Bio Philosophy"	4:40
11.	"Memphis, Milano"	10:27
Total length:		36:26

== See also ==
- 1985 in Japanese music
