= Bon Voyage co. =

Studio album by Harry "The Crown" Hosono
- Released: July 25, 1976
- Studios: Crown Studio, Akasaka, Minato, Tokyo
- Genres: Jazz fusion; exotica
- Labels: PANAM, CROWN
- Producer: Haruomi Hosono

Haruomi Hosono chronology
Tropical Dandy (1975)	Bon Voyage co. (1976)	Paraiso (1978)

Singles from Bon Voyage co.
- 1. ""Peking Duck"/"Black Peanuts"" Released: 1975

Bon Voyage co. (泰安洋行, Taian Yōkō) is the third solo studio album by Japanese musician Haruomi Hosono Released on July 25, 1975, Bon Voyage co. continues the tropical style of Tropical Dandy (which would continue later on with Paraiso) while showing influence from the music of New Orleans and also features performances from Tin Pan Alley and Happy End (excluding Takashi Matsumoto). The album's Japanese title was influenced by a Nagasaki convenience store of the same name that Hosono met while on Tin Pan Alley's "First & Last Concert Tour". This album was re-issued as part of a box set with the single version of the Tropical Dandy song "Peking Duck" (which was coupled with a song from this album) and an interview Hosono gave on a Tokyo Broadcasting System radio show.

== Track listing ==
All tracks are written by Haruomi Hosono, except "Hong Kong Blues" by Hoagy Carmichael and "“Sayonara", the Japanese Farewell Song", with music by Yoshida Hasegawa and lyrics by Freddy Morgan.

No.	Title	Length
1.	"Butterfly-San" (蝶々-San Chōchō-San)	3:15
2.	"Hong Kong Blues" (香港Blues Hon Kon Blues)	3:09
3.	""Sayonara", the Japanese Farewell Song"	4:31
4.	"Roochoo Gumbo"	3:01
5.	"Bon Voyage co." (泰安洋行 Taian Yōkō)	2:36
6.	"Tōkyō Shyness Boy" (東京Shyness Boy)	2:19
7.	"Black Peanuts"	2:28
8.	"Chow Chow Dog"	4:46
9.	"Pom Pom Vapor" (Pom Pom蒸気 Pom Pom Jōki)	1:56
10.	"Exotica Lullaby"	3:49

Harry Hosono Crown Years 1974–1977 box set bonus tracks
No.	Title	Length
11.	"Peking Duck" (北京DUCK Pekin Duck) (Single Version)	2:41
12.	"Harry's Talking in Radio"	7:19

== Personnel ==
- Haruomi Hosono – lead vocals (all), backing vocals (7), bass guitar (all), steelpan (5), marimba (3, 5,7), shamisen (1, 2), vibraphone (2), piano (5-7), electric piano (8), Hammond organ (10), drums (6), production, liner notes
- Shigeru Suzuki – electric guitar (1, 3, 4, 8-10), acoustic guitar (3, 7, 9), backing vocals (7)
- Eiichi Ohtaki – backing vocals (1)
- Tatsuo Hayashi – drums (1-4, 6-10), percussion (3, 7), backing vocals (7)
- Hiroki Komazawa – pedal steel guitar (9)
- Hiroshi Satō – piano (1-4, 9, 10), clarinet (3), Roland keyboard (10)
- Motoya Hamaguchi – percussion (2-4, 10)
- Akiko Yano – RMI Electra piano (1, 2), backing vocals (3, 4)
- Toru Okada – percussion, accordion (7)
- Hiroshi Okazaki – alto saxophone (1)
- Ken Muraoka – tenor saxophone (1)
- Riyōsō Sunahara – bass saxophone (1)
- Tatsuro Yamashita – ship captain voice (1), backing vocals (1)
- Kawada Ryūkyū Dance Troupe – butterfly voice, backing vocals (1, 4)
- Tadashi Kosaka - backing vocals (8, 9)
- Taeko Ōnuki - backing vocals (3, 4)
- Makoto Kubota - backing vocals (8, 9)
- Kazuhiro Ichihashi - backing vocals (8)
- Yasushi Nakane - backing vocals (8)

== See also ==
- 1976 in Japanese music
