= Mimori Yusa =

Japanese singer-songwriter

Mimori Yusa 遊佐 未森
- Born: February 20, 1964 (age 62)
- Origin: Sendai, Miyagi, Japan
- Genres: J-pop, pop rock, folk, adult contemporary
- Occupation: Singer-songwriter
- Years active: 1987–present
- Website: http://www.mimoriyusa.net

Mimori Yusa (遊佐 未森, Yusa Mimori), (born February 20, 1964, in Sendai in Miyagi Prefecture), is a Japanese singer-songwriter. She made her nationwide debut at the age of 6 on the TV program Chibikko Nodojiman, which she recited the Takibi nursery rhyme. Shortly after graduating college, she recorded a demo, and signed to Epic/Sony Records in 1987, which officially began her music career. Although she has since had a very prolific career, Yusa became popular for her song "Kuro", which was featured on the NHK television program Minna no Uta from December 2005 until January 2006. She was also in the mid-1990s supergroup Love, Peace & Trance, which also featured Mishio Ogawa, Miyako Koda from Dip in the Pool and Haruomi Hosono as the producer, composer and songwriter.

== Discography ==
=== Albums ===
- Hitomi Suishō (瞳水晶) (1988)
- Soramimi no Oka (空耳の丘) (1988)
- Harmoniodeon (ハルモニオデオン) (1989)
- Hope (1990)
- Mosaic (モザイク) (1991)
- Momo to Mimi (桃と耳) (1992)
- Momoism (1993)
- Mizuiro (水色) (1994)
- Alui-Halenohi (アルヒハレノヒ) (1994)
- Acacia (アカシア) (1996)
- Roka (1997)
- Echo (1998)
- Mimomemo: The Memorable Songs of Mimori Yusa (1998)
- Niwa (庭) (1999)
- Small is Beautiful (2000)
- Honoka (2001)
- Still Life (2001)
- Lemon (檸檬) (2002)
- Travelogue Sweet and Bitter Collection (2002)
- Bougainvillea (2003)
- Bougainvillea Reflect (2003)
- Breath at the Show (2004)
- Kyūka Goya (休暇小屋) (2006)
- Swete Lemon (スヰート檸檬) (2008)
- Ginga Techyo (銀河手帖) (2009)
- Mimori yusa concert 2009/銀河手帖 (2009)
- Do-Re-Mimo ～the singles collection～ (2010)
- Awa Yuki (淡雪) (2012)
- Violetta: The Best of 25 Years (2013)
- piano album (2015)
- Seseragi (せせらぎ) (2016)
- P E A C H T R E E (2018)
- PEACH LIFE (2019)
- Shiosai (潮騒) (2021)
- Shiosai UNLIMITED / LIVE IN TOKYO 20221103 (潮騒UNLIMITED / LIVE IN TOKYO 20221103) (2023)

=== Singles ===
- "Hitomisuishō" (瞳水晶) (1988)
- "Mado o aketa toki" (窓を開けたとき) (1988)
- "Chizu o kudasai" (地図をください) (1989)
- "0 No oka ∞ no sora" (0の丘∞の空) (1989)
- "Kurete yuku sora wa" (暮れてゆく空は) (1989)
- "Silent Bells" (1989)
- "Natsukusa no senro" (夏草の線路) (1990)
- "No no Hana" (野の花) (1990)
- "Yume o Mita" (夢をみた) (1990)
- "One" (1991)
- "Kutsu ato no hana ~ arusurān senki yori ~" (靴跡の花 ～アルスラーン戦記より～) (1991)
- "Sora" (空) (1991)
- "Grace" (1992)
- "Tokyo no Sora no Shita" (東京の空の下) (1992)
- "Hitotsubu no yokan" (一粒の予感) (1993)
- "Midori no e" (緑の絵) (1994)
- "Saku to ī na" (咲くといいな) (1994)
- "Koi kashira" (恋かしら) (1994)
- "Tashikana gūzen" (たしかな偶然) (1995)
- "Yasei no chūrippu" (野生のチューリップ) (1995)
- "Seikatsu no purin" (生活のプリン) (1996)
- "Harmonica Kaigan" (ハモニカ海岸) (1997)
- "Roka" (ロカ) (1997)
- "Tapestry" (タペストリー) (1997)
- "Lemon no Ki" (レモンの木) (1998)
- "Borderline" (ボーダーライン, Bōdārain) (1998)
- "Popular" (ポプラ) (1999)
- "Sora ni Saku Hana " (空に咲く花) (2000)
- "Cocoa" (ココア) (2000)
- "I'll Remember" (2001)
- "Light Song" (2003)
- "Kuro" (クロ) (2005)
- "I'm here with you" (2009)
- "Carillon Dance" (カリヨン・ダンス) (2015)
- "Suzukake no Kaze kaoru" (鈴懸の風薫る) (2017)
- "Mizutama" (水玉) (2018)
- "National Municipal Eighth Elementary School School Song" (国立市立国立第八小学校校歌) (2018)
