= Haruomi Hosono =

Japanese musician (born 1947)

Haruomi Hosono 細野晴臣
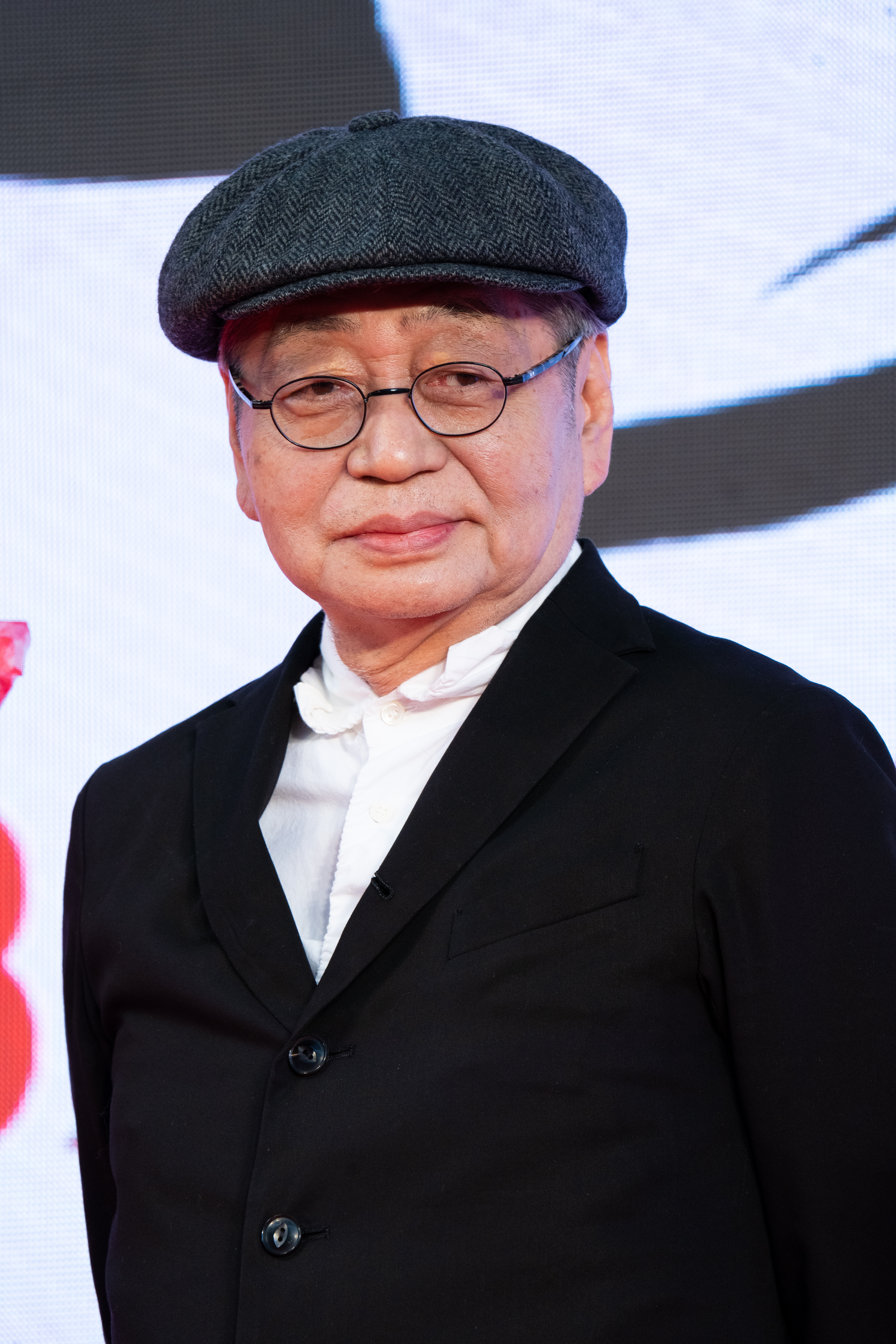
- Hosono at the Tokyo International Film Festival, 2019

Background information
- Also known as: Harry "The Crown" Hosono
- Born: July 9, 1947 (age 79); Minato, Tokyo, Japan
- Genres: Exotica; electronic; pop; experimental; progressive rock; folk rock; psychedelic rock
- Occupations: Musician; singer; songwriter; record producer
- Instruments: Bass guitar; keyboards; guitar; vocals
- Years active: 1969–present
- Labels: King Records / Bellwood Records (1973–1974); Nippon Crown / PANAM Rabel (1974–1977); Alfa Records (1977–1982); Alfa Records / YEN Rabel (1982–1984); Teichiku / Non Standard, MONAD (1984–1987); Epic/Sony Records (1987–1995); cutting edge(Toshiba EMI) / daisyworld discs (1996–2003); Victor Entertainment / SPEEDSTAR RECORDS / daisyworld discs (2006–present); Nippon Columbia / daisyworld discs (2008–2009); Light in the Attic Records (U.S. edition, 2018–present)
- Formerly of: Yellow Magic Orchestra; Happy End; Apryl Fool; Sketch Show
- Website: hosonoharuomi.jp

Haruomi Hosono (Japanese: 細野 晴臣 (Note: Japanese pronunciation: [hosono haɾɯꜜomʲi]), Hepburn: Hosono Haruomi; born July 9, 1947), sometimes credited as Harry Hosono, is a Japanese musician, singer, songwriter and record producer. He is considered to be one of the most influential musicians in Japanese pop music history, credited with shaping the sound of Japanese pop for decades as well as pop music outside of Japan. He also inspired genres such as city pop and Shibuya-kei, and as the leader of the Yellow Magic Orchestra, contributed to the development and pioneering of numerous electronic genres.

The grandson of Titanic survivor Masabumi Hosono, Haruomi began his career with the psychedelic rock band Apryl Fool, before achieving recognition both nationally and internationally, as a founding member of the bands Happy End and Yellow Magic Orchestra. Hosono has also released many solo albums covering a variety of styles, including film soundtracks and a variety of electronic ambient albums. As well as recording his own music, Hosono has done considerable production work for other artists such as Miharu Koshi, Sheena and the Roketts, Sandii & the Sunsetz, Chisato Moritaka and Seiko Matsuda. In 2003, Hosono was ranked by HMV at number 44 on their list of the top 100 Japanese pop acts of all time.

== Biography ==
Hosono is the grandson of Masabumi Hosono, the only Japanese passenger and survivor of the sinking of RMS Titanic. Hosono first came to attention in Japan as the bass player of the psychedelic rock band Apryl Fool, alongside drummer Takashi Matsumoto, who released the album The Apryl Fool in 1969. Hosono and Matsumoto then formed the influential folk rock group Happy End with Eiichi Ohtaki and Shigeru Suzuki. One of the songs he composed for Happy End, "Kaze wo Atsumete" (1971), later appeared in the American film Lost in Translation and on its soundtrack in 2003.

After Happy End disbanded in 1972, Hosono and Suzuki formed Caramel Mama (キャラメル・ママ) with Tatsuo Hayashi and Masataka Matsutoya the following year. They changed their name to Tin Pan Alley (ティン・パン・アレー) a year later and worked as session musicians for other artists, such as Yumi Arai. Suzuki said the idea was to form a collective like the Muscle Shoals Rhythm Section, but things did not go as planned.

Hosono released his first solo album in 1973, Hosono House. His involvement in electronic music also dates back to the early 1970s, when he performed the electric upright bass for Yōsui Inoue's album Kōri no Sekai (1973) and Osamu Kitajima's album Benzaiten (1974), both of which utilize synthesizers, electric guitars, and in the latter, electronic drums and rhythm machines.

In 1977, Hosono invited Ryuichi Sakamoto and Yukihiro Takahashi to work on his exotica-flavoured album Paraiso, which included electronic music produced using the Yamaha CS-80 polyphonic synthesizer and ARP Odyssey synthesizer. The band was named "Harry Hosono and the Yellow Magic Band" and, having been recorded in late 1977, Paraiso was released in early 1978. The three worked together again for the 1978 electronic album Pacific, which included an early version of the song "Cosmic Surfin'".

In 1978, he released an innovative electronic soundtrack for a fictional Bollywood film, Cochin Moon, together with artist Tadanori Yokoo and future YMO band members Ryuichi Sakamoto and Hideki Matsutake. Inspired by a trip to India and "the exotic, luxurious, and seemingly wonder-filled scenarios played out in Indian cinemas", it was an experimental "electro-exotica" album fusing exotic Indian music (reminiscent of Ravi Shankar and Bollywood music) with electronic music, including an early "synth raga" song entitled "Hum Ghar Sajan" (from a Guru Granth Sahib phrase). The same year, he contributed to Sakamoto's song "1000 Knives" for his solo album, Thousand Knives, which experimented with fusing electronic music with traditional Japanese music in early 1978.

He was one of the first producers to recognize the appeal of video game sounds and music. YMO's self-titled debut in 1978 contained substantial video game sounds and after YMO disbanded an early project was an album simply titled Video Game Music containing mixed and edited Namco arcade game music and sounds. Video Game Music was released in 1984 as an early example of a chiptune record and the first video game music album. That same year, he also produced the theme song for Hayao Miyazaki's popular anime film Nausicaä of the Valley of the Wind, "Kaze no Tani no Naushika", with vocals by actress-singer Narumi Yasuda. In the late 80s and early 90s, the influence of world music on his music deepened, and he worked with international singers and musicians such as Amina Annabi.

He has produced a number of short-term band projects as a band member. His first post-YMO band was Friends of Earth. As with most of his projects he combines musical styles he's interested in. F.O.E. seemed to be a combination of funk and techno, and included a collaboration with James Brown and Maceo Parker for a remake of the song "Sex Machine". Another notable band project was 1995's Love, Peace & Trance. Members were Mimori Yusa ("Love"), Miyako Koda ("Peace"), Haruomi Hosono ("&") and Mishio Ogawa ("Trance").

In the 1990s he started the Daisyworld label to release a wide range of experimental artists from Japan and the rest of the world. Hosono collaborated on many of the releases, such as World Standard, a trip into Americana; HAT, a supergroup (the acronym stands for Hosono, Atom Heart, Tetsu Inoue), and "Quiet Logic", by Mixmaster Morris and Jonah Sharp. The Orb also paid tribute with a series of remixes including the notorious "Hope You Choke on Your Whalemeat" remix of "Nanga Def".

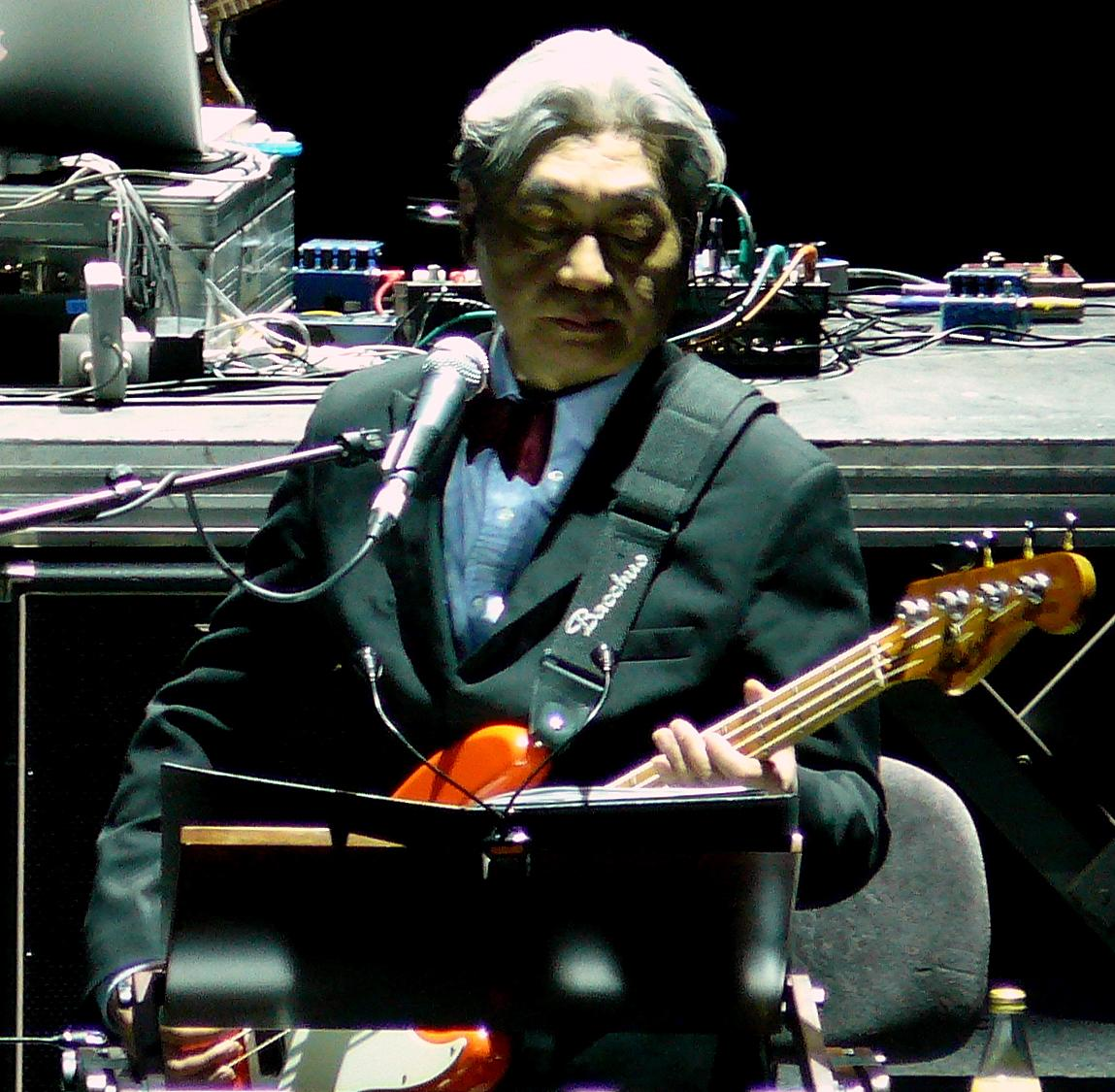
Hosono performing with YMO in 2008.

In 2002 Haruomi formed the duo Sketch Show with his YMO bandmate Yukihiro Takahashi. They have released two albums, one of which, Loophole, has received a UK release. When the third former YMO member, Ryuichi Sakamoto deepened his involvement it was decided to bill those collaborations as Human Audio Sponge.

In the spring of 2007, his fellow YMO members and other artist paid tribute to Haruomi with a 2-disc album titled Tribute to Haruomi. That same year, the animated film Appleseed Ex Machina was released featuring a soundtrack performed and supervised by Hosono.

In September 2010 he performed at the De La Fantasia festival and played songs from his upcoming album.

In February 2011 it was announced that his new album, entitled HoSoNoVa, was to be released on April 20. He also performed a special concert to celebrate its release.

In May 2018, Light in the Attic Records announced a CD and vinyl reissue of five of Hosono's albums—Hosono House, Cochin Moon, Paraiso, Philharmony and omni Sight Seeing—for release in August and September 2018. The former four albums had never been released outside of Japan previously. Coinciding was the announcement that Hosono would play his first UK concerts as a solo artist in June; the shows were scheduled as part of Sakamoto's MODE festival happening throughout England in June and July. The June 23 concert at the Barbican Centre in London featured an appearance by his YMO bandmates, with whom he performed his Solid State Survivor composition "Absolute Ego Dance".

2019 marked Hosono's 50th anniversary in the music industry. On March 6, he released Hochono House, a mostly electronic remake of his solo debut Hosono House that reversed the track listing. That spring, he performed his first solo shows in the U.S. This run included two sold-out shows at the Gramercy Theatre in New York City and a concert at the Mayan Theater in Los Angeles. The second New York show saw an appearance by current NYC resident Akiko Yano, who collaborated with Hosono in Tin Pan Alley, as a live support member of YMO, and as a solo artist; she sang Hosono's "Ai Ai Gasa", which she covered on her 1977 album Iroha Ni Konpeitou. In LA, Canadian indie rock musician Mac DeMarco—whose vocal admiration of Hosono has spread to a portion of his own fanbase—appeared during the show to perform "Honey Moon" as a duet with Hosono; Light in the Attic had recently released a cover of the song on a 7" single record, backed with the original version.

In the autumn of 2019, an exhibition on Hosono's career—"Hosono Sightseeing"—was on display in Tokyo Sky View at the Roppongi Hills Mori Tower; along with other memorabilia, this featured many of the instruments associated with Hosono, such as the Roland TR-808, E-mu Emulator, and Prophet-5. A documentary film, No Smoking, was also released, including footage from the U.S. and UK shows; appearances include Sakamoto, Takahashi, Demarco, longtime friend Van Dyke Parks, and protégé Gen Hoshino. In July 2025, Haruomi Hosono performed his first UK show in seven years at London's Southbank Centre. The concert received heightened attention following praise from One Direction founding member Harry Styles, who explained that his 2022 album, Harry's House, was "named after Haruomi Hosono, who released an album in the '70s called Hosono's House."

In May 2026, Hosono announced that a new studio album, Yours Sincerely, would be releasing on September 11, 2026 via Ghostly International. This was supported by his first U.S. dates since 2019, first at Radio City Music Hall in New York then the Greek Theatre in Los Angeles, the latter of which Hosono first performed in the country with YMO in 1979; both concerts were opened by Toro y Moi.

== Bands and collaborations ==
- Apryl Fool
- Happy End
- Tin Pan Alley
- Yellow Magic Orchestra
- Friends of Earth (F.O.E) (with Eiki Nonaka)
- HIS (with Kiyoshirō Imawano and Fuyumi Sakamoto)
- Testpattern (with Yukihiro Takahashi, Fumio Ichimura, and Masao Hiruma)
- Love, Peace & Trance (Mimori Yusa, Miyako Koda and Mishio Ogawa)
- Swing Slow (with Miharu Koshi)
- HAT (with Atom Heart and Tetsu Inoue)
- Harry & Mac (with Makoto Kubota)
- Tin Pan (with Tatsuo Hayashi and Shigeru Suzuki)
- Sketch Show (with Yukihiro Takahashi)
- HASYMO (previously Human Audio Sponge) (Sketch Show and Ryuichi Sakamoto, with Keigo Oyamada, Hiroshi Takano, Christian Fennesz, Tomohiko Gondō and Ren Takada as live support)

== Discography ==
=== Albums ===
==== Studio albums ====
Title	Album details	Peak chart positions
Title	Album details	JPN Oricon
Hosono House	Released: 25 May 1973; Label: Velvet; Formats: LP, CD, digital download, streaming	-
Tropical Dandy	Released: 25 July 1975; Label: Nippon Crown; Formats: LP, CD, digital download, streaming	50
Bon Voyage co. (泰安洋行, Taian Yōkō)	Released: 25 June 1976; Label: Nippon Crown; Formats: LP, Cassette tape, CD, digital download, streaming	77
Paraiso (はらいそ, Haraiso)	Released: 25 April 1978; Label: Alfa; Formats: LP, Cassette tape, CD, digital download, streaming	-
Cochin Moon (コチンの月, Kochin no Tsuki)	Released: 21 September 1978; Label: King; Formats: LP, CD, digital download, streaming	-
Philharmony (フィルハーモニー)	Released: 21 May 1982; Label: Alpha; Formats: LP, Cassette tape, CD, digital download, streaming	33
Watering A Flower (花に水, Hana ni Mizu)	Released: 10 September 1984; Label: Toujuu; Formats: Cassette tape	-
S-F-X	Released: 16 December 1984; Label: Non Standard; Formats: LP, Cassette tape, CD, digital download, streaming	35
Coincidental Music	Released: 21 August 1985; Label: Non Standard; Formats: LP, Cassette tape, CD, digital download, streaming	61
Mercuric Dance	Released: 21 September 1985; Label: Non Standard; Formats: LP, Cassette tape, CD, digital download, streaming	-
Endless Talking	Released: 21 October 1985; Label: Non Standard; Formats: LP, Cassette tape, CD, digital download, streaming	-
Omni Sight Seeing	Released: 21 July 1989; Label: Epic Japan; Formats: CD, digital download, streaming	-
Medicine Compilation	Released: 21 March 1993; Label: Epic Japan; Formats: CD, digital download, streaming	-
Good Sport	Released: 10 September 1995; Label: Medium; Formats: CD, digital download, streaming	-
Naga	Released: 25 October 1995; Label: Foa; Formats: CD, digital download, streaming	-
Flying Saucer 1947	Released: 26 September 2007; Label: Speedstar; Formats: CD, digital download, streaming	57
Hosono Haruomi Archives Vol.1	Released: 9 July 2008; Label: Daisyworld; Formats: CD, digital download, streaming	115
HoSoNoVa	Released: 20 April 2011; Label: Speedstar; Formats: CD, digital download, streaming	21
Heavenly Music	Released: 22 May 2013; Label: Speedstar; Formats: CD, LP, digital download, streaming	12
Vu Ja De	Released: 8 November 2017; Label: Speedstar; Formats: CD, digital download, streaming	18
Hochono House	Released: 6 March 2019; Label: Speedstar; Formats: CD, LP, digital download, streaming	10
Yours Sincerely	Released: 11 September 2026; Label: Echoes, Sony Japan, Ghostly International; Formats: CD, Cassette tape, LP, digital download, streaming	11

==== Soundtrack albums ====
Title	Album details	Peak chart positions
Title	Album details	JPN Oricon
Night on the Galactic Railroad (銀河鉄道の夜, Ginga Tetsudō no Yoru)	Released: 1985; Label: Non Standard; Formats: LP, CT	-
Paradise View	Released: 1985; Label: Monad; Formats: LP, CT	-
The Tale of Genji (源氏物語, Genji Monogatari)	Released: 1987; Label: Epic Sony; Formats: LP, CT, CD	-
La Maison de Himiko (メゾン・ド・ヒミコ)	Released: 2005; Label: Warner Music Japan; Formats: CD	-
Shoplifters	Released: 2018; Label: Speedstar; Formats: LP, digital download, streaming	-
Malu	Released: 2020; Label: Speedstar; Formats: digital download, streaming	-
Music for films 2020-2021	Released: 2021; Label: Speedstar; Formats: LP, digital download, streaming	-

==== Tribute albums ====
Title	Album details	Peak chart positions
Title	Album details	JPN Oricon
Tribute to Haruomi Hosono	Released: 25 April 2007; Label: Commmons; Formats: CD, digital download, streaming	23
Strange Song Book – Tribute to Haruomi Hosono 2	Released: 23 January 2008; Label: Commmons; Formats: CD, digital download, streaming	55
Hosono House Revisited	Released: 1 November 2024; Label: Stones Throw; Formats: LP, digital download, streaming	

==== Remix albums ====
Title	Album details	Peak chart positions
Title	Album details	JPN Oricon
Hosono Haruomi in the '90s The Michael Brook Remix	Released: 1992; Label: Alfa; Formats: CD	-
Mental Sports Remixes	Released: 1993; Label: Epic Sony; Formats: CD, LP	-
Mix Form	Released: 2004; Label: Progressive form; Formats: CD	-

==== Live albums ====
Title	Album details	Peak chart positions
Title	Album details	JPN Oricon
America-Hosono Haruomi Live in US 2019	Released: 2021; Label: Velvet; Formats: CD, digital download, streaming	26

==== Compilation albums ====
Title	Album details	Peak chart positions
Title	Album details	JPN Oricon
Early Hosono Haruomi	Released: 1982; Label: Velvet; Formats: LP, CD	-
Hurry up Hosono - Haruomi Hosono Best Selections	Released: 1983; Label: Nippon Crown; Formats: LP, CD	-
Haruomi Hosono Best 12	Released: 1984; Label: Nippon Crown; Formats: CD	-
Haruomi Hosono 17 Songs	Released: 1987; Label: Nippon Crown; Formats: CD	-
The Best Instrumental Music of Haruomi Hosono Calm	Released: 1988; Label: Non Standard; Formats: CD	-
Haruomi Hosono Best	Released: 1989; Label: Nippon Crown; Formats: CD	-
Ketteiban Hosono Haruomi Best Selection	Released: 1990; Label: Alfa; Formats: CD	-
Haruomi Hosono Best 15	Released: 1992; Label: Nippon Crown; Formats: CD	-
Hosono Haruomi Compiled By Hoshino Gen	Released: 2019; Label: Speedstar; Formats: CD	23
Hosono Haruomi Compiled By Oyamada Keigo	Released: 2019; Label: Speedstar; Formats: CD	43

==== Box sets ====
Title	Album details	Peak chart positions
Title	Album details	JPN Oricon
Hosono Box 1969–2000	Released: 23 March 2000; Label: Daisyworld; Formats: CD	-
Monad Box	Released: 27 February 2002; Label: Non Standard; Formats: CD	-
Harry Hosono Crown Years 1974–1977	Released: 7 February 2007; Label: Non Standard; Formats: CD+DVD	57
Hosono Haruomi no Kayoukyoku 20Seiki Box	Released: 29 April 2009; Label: Nippon Columbia; Formats: CD+DVD	64

==== Other albums ====
- Making of Non-Standard Music/Making of Monad Music (EP) (1984, Non Standard)
- N.D.E. ("Near Death Experience") (1995)
- Interpieces Organization (1996, by Haruomi Hosono & Bill Laswell)
- Road to Louisiana (ルイジアナ珍道中, Ruijiana Chindōchū) (1999, with Makoto Kubota as "Harry & Mac")

=== Singles ===
Year	Album	Chart positions (JP)	Label
1973	"Koi wa Momoiro"	-	Velvet
1975	"Kinukaidou"	-	Crown
1976	"Peking Duck"	-	Crown
1982	"Sangokushi Main Theme"	-	Alfa
1984	"SUPER XEVIOUS"	-	Alfa
1984	"Making of NON-STANDARD MUSIC/Making of MONAD MUSIC"	41	Non Standard
1998	"Jade Ken Ishii"	-	Foa

=== Contributions ===
- By Yumi Matsutoya:
  - Hikō-ki Gumo (1973) (contributed bass)
  - Misslim (1974) (contributed bass and cowbell)
  - Cobalt Hour (1975) (contributed bass)
  - 14-banme no Tsuki (The 14th Moon) (1976) (contributed steel drum)
  - Benisuzume (1978) (contributed bass)
- CBS/Sony Sound Image Series:
  - Pacific (with Shigeru Suzuki and Tatsuro Yamashita) (tracks 1, 4 and 8 composed and performed by Hosono) (1978)
  - The Aegean Sea (with Masataka Matsutoya and Takahiko Ishikawa) (tracks 3 and 4 composed and performed by Hosono) (1979)
  - Vol. 1 – Island Music (with Suzuki, Yamashita, Matsutoya, Ishikawa and Ryuichi Sakamoto) (tracks 1, 7, 9 and 10 composed and performed by Hosono) (1983)
  - Vol. 2 – Off Shore (Suzuki, Yamashita, Matsutoya, Sakamoto, Masaki Matsubara and Kazumasa Akiyama) (tracks 1 and 2 composed and performed by Hosono) (1983)
- 3D Museum (1993)
- Melon Brains (1994)
- Goku (1995)
- Love, Peace & Trance (1995)
- Lattice (2000)

==== Songwriting credits ====
- Video Game Music (1984, songs from Namco games arranged and produced by Hosono)
- Nausicaä of the Valley of the Wind (風の谷のナウシカ, Kaze no Tani no Naushika) (1984, anime soundtrack, only produced theme song sung by Narumi Yasuda)
- Coincidental Music (1985, compilation of assorted background music/soundtrack commissions)
- Why Dogs Don't Talk Anymore (だから犬はほえる, Dakara Inu wa Hoeru) (1996, background music for and included with the Taro Manabe picture book of the same name)
- Ex Machina Original Soundtrack/Original Soundtrack Complete Edition (2007, soundtrack supervention, composition of some tracks)

== Videography ==
=== Live video albums ===
	Release	Title	Format	Serial number	Chart
Speedstar
1st	18 March 2015	Hosono Haruomi x Sakamoto Ryuichi at Ex Theater Roppongi 2013.12.21	DVD	VIBL-738	-
1st	18 March 2015	Hosono Haruomi x Sakamoto Ryuichi at Ex Theater Roppongi 2013.12.21	BD	VIXL-138	-
2nd	21 December 2016	A Nights in Chinatown	DVD	VIBL-827	-
2nd	21 December 2016	A Nights in Chinatown	BD	-	-
3rd	10 February 2021	Hosono Haruomi 50shuunen Kinen Tokubetsu Kouen	DVD	VIBL-1010	-
3rd	10 February 2021	Hosono Haruomi 50shuunen Kinen Tokubetsu Kouen	BD	VIXL-331	-
4th	23 August 2023	SAYONARA AMERICA	DVD	VIBL-1097	-
4th	23 August 2023	SAYONARA AMERICA	BD	VIXL-417	17

=== Box sets ===
	Release	Title	Format	Serial number	Chart
Speedstar
1st	10 February 2021	Hosono Haruomi 50th: Music, Comedy and Movie	DVD	VIZL-1857	-

== Composition work ==
- Imokin Trio (イモ欽トリオ):

High School Lullaby (ハイスクールララバイ) (1981)
Teardrop Tanteidan (ティアドロップ探偵団) (1982)

- Miki Fujimura:

仏蘭西映画
夢・恋・人 (1983)
妖星傅
春 Mon Amour

- Yoshie Kashiwabara: Shiawase Ondo (しあわせ音頭) (1982)
- Starbow: Heartbreak Taiyōzoku (ハートブレイク太陽族) (1982)
- Kumiko Yamashita:

赤道小町ドキッ (1982)
Teenage Eagles (1983)

- Kawakamisan to Nagashimasan: きたかチョーさんまってたドン (1983)
- Miki Matsubara: Paradise Beach (Sophie's Theme) (パラダイス ビーチ(ソフィーのテーマ), Paradaisu Biichi (Sofii no Teema)) (1983)
- Seiko Matsuda:

Tegoku no Kiss/Wagamama na Kataomoi (天国のキッス／わがままな片想い) (1983)
Glass no Ringo (ガラスの林檎) (1983)
Pink no Mozart (ピンクのモーツァルト) (1984)

- Shin'ichi Mori:

New York Monogatari (紐育物語) (1983)
Whiskey Iro no Machi de (ウイスキー色の街で)

- Akina Nakamori: Kinku (禁区) (1983)
- Apogee & Perigee (Jun Togawa, Yuji Miyake and other artists):

Getsusekai Ryokou (月世界旅行) (1984, Alfa)
Shinkuu Kiss (真空キッス) (1984, Alfa)

- Jun Togawa: 玉姫様 (1984)
- Narumi Yasuda: Kaze no Tani no Nausicaä (風の谷のナウシカ, Kaze no Tani no Naushika; Nausicaä of the Valley of the Wind) (image song for the film) (1984)
- "NHK News Today" opening theme (1988, NHK TV)
- Chisato Moritaka:

Miracle Light (ミラクルライト) (1997, zetima)
Kotoshi no Natsu wa More Better (今年の夏はモアベター; This Summer Will Be More Better) – Writing, Performance, Production (1998, zetima)

- Chappie: Tanabata no Yoru, Kimi ni Aitai (七夕の夜、君に逢いたい) (1999)
- Kuniko Yamada: Tetsugaku Shiyō (哲学しよう)
- Masatō Ibu: Datte, Hormone Love (だって、ホルモンラブ)

== Filmography ==
Music

- Evening Primrose (1974)
- Summer Secret (1982)
- Night on the Galactic Railroad (1985)
- Paradise View (1985)
- A Promise (1986)
- Jazz Daimyō (1986)
- Murasaki SHikubu-Genji Monogatari (1987)
- Hoshi wo Tsugumono (1990)
- Southern Winds (1993)
- On the Way (2000)
- House of Himiko (2005)
- Appleseed Ex Machina (2007, Music supervising director)
- Shoplifters (2018)

Acting

- Izakaya Chōji (1983)
- A Y.M.O. Film Propaganda (1984)
- Paradise view (1985)
- Shigatsu no Sakana (1985)
- Binetsu Shōnen (1987)
- Norwegian Wood (2010): Record Shop Manager
- Isle of Dogs (2018): Scrap (Japanese dub)
- They Say Nothing Stays the Same (2019)
- Bullets, Bones and Blocked Noses (2021, TV miniseries): Barber
- Spirit World (2025)

Documentary appearance

- Tokyo Melody (1985)
- No Smoking (2019)

== Related books ==
- Soichiro Suzuki (2015). Hosono Haruomi Rokuonjustu: Bokura wa Koushite Oto wo Tsukuttekita. DU BOOKS. ISBN 978-4-907583-69-9.
