= Tadanori Yokoo =

Japanese artist (born 1936)

- 横尾 忠則
- Born: June 27, 1936 (age 90); Nishiwaki, Hyōgo, Japan
- Occupation: Graphic designer
- Awards: Praemium Imperiale (2015)

Tadanori Yokoo (横尾 忠則, Yokoo Tadanori; born 27 June 1936) is a Japanese graphic designer, illustrator, printmaker and painter. Yokoo's signature style of psychedelia and pastiche engages a wide span of modern visual and cultural phenomena from Japan and around the world.

== Career ==
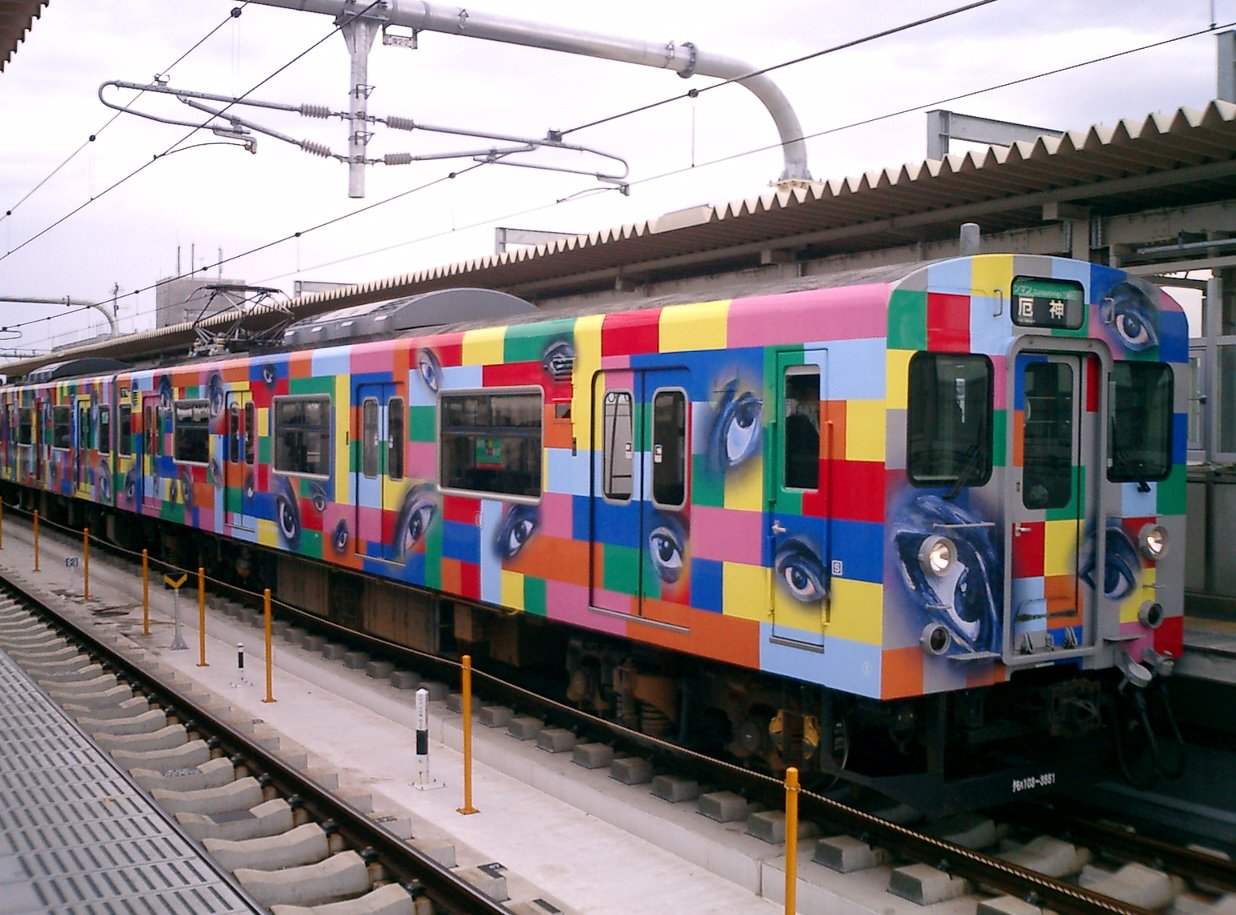
Train with eyes by Tadanori Yokoo, 2005

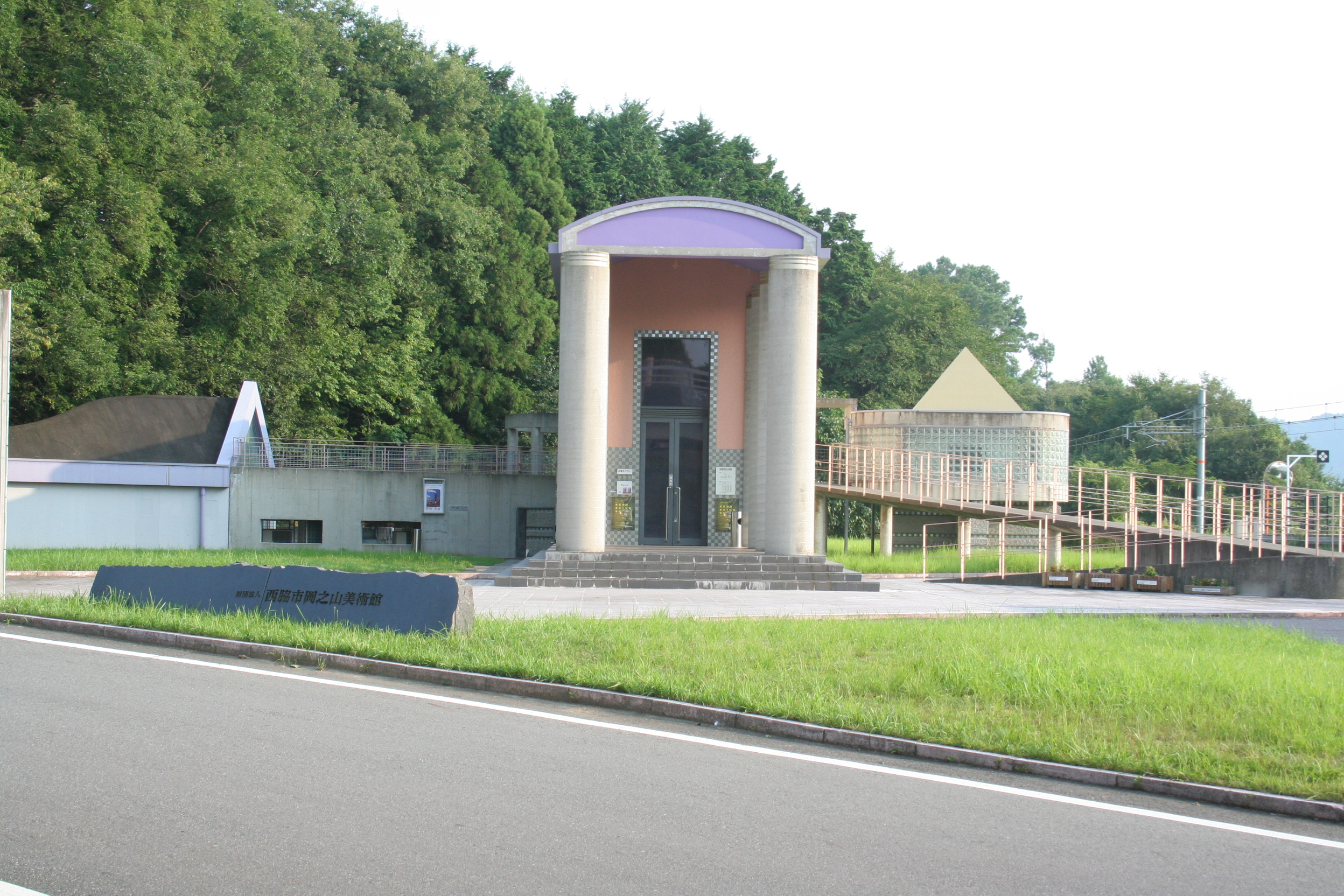
Okanoyama Museum

Tadanori Yokoo, born in Nishiwaki, Hyōgo Prefecture, Japan, in 1936, is one of Japan's most successful and internationally recognized graphic designers and artists. He began his career as a stage designer for avant garde theatre in Tokyo. His early work shows the influence of the New York-based Push Pin Studio (Milton Glaser and Seymour Chwast in particular), but Yokoo cites filmmaker Akira Kurosawa as his most formative influence.

The designer's ambition embarked on at an early age during Yokoo's teenager years, and before moving to Tokyo, he had done graphic design-related works for a period of time for the Chamber of Commerce in Nishiwaki. At the age of 22, Yokoo won an heritable mention at the Japanese Advertising Artists Club (JAAC) poster exhibition in Tokyo and joined the JAAC, and officially moved to Tokyo around 1960.

The year of 1965 witnessed Yokoo's rising as an eminent young artist in the post-war era. The first work of his to receive popularity, Tadanori Yokoo (1965) was on view at the Persona exhibition, featuring 16 designers and held at Tokyo's Matsuya department store. This self-portrait poster shows the artist as a man who hanged himself, captioned in English with "Made in Japan/Having reached a climax at the age of 29, I was dead." The lower left shows a cutout of Yokoo's photograph taken at age one and a half and on opposing side we find another cutout placed at the back, showing likely a group photo taken at school during Yokoo's teenage years. The rising sun, the most representative symbol of wartime Japan, dominates the layout. On the upper corners, the Shinkansen on one side and the nuclear bomb on the other, break through Mt. Fuji, another icon of Japan. Yokoo explained, "...with Tadanori Yokoo, these works represented a form of rebirth for me." The poster, on the one hand, was a death statement the artist issued for himself, aiming to break away from his own past. On the other hand, the integration of a bold, collage-like style along with the presence of nationalistic symbols such as the rising sun, Shinkansen, and even Mt. Fuji, Yokoo set out to challenge the state of design, and that of culture and politics at large in post-war Japan. By acting against the Bauhaus-led, abstract design that prevailed Japanese graphic design during the 1960s, Yokoo delivered an audacious deviation that criticized the passive acceptance of Western modernism in Japan and on top of that, the country's rapid economic growth.

Yokoo was a frequent collaborator with choreographer Hijikata Tatsumi. One of his best known works, A la Maison de M.Civeçawa (1966), was a poster designed for a performance by Tatsumi Hijikata's Ankoku Butoh dance company. In A la Maison de M.Civeçawa, Yokoo again employed his stylish collage coated with dark humor, citing photos of Tatsuhiko Shibusawa (a novelist to whom the dance was dedicated to, top left corner), Hijikata and fellow Butoh dancer Kazuo Ohno (on the rose stem in the middle of the composition), and the famous painting Gabrielle d'Estrées and One of Her Sisters from 1594. In the backdrop we find again the rising sun, Mt. Fuji, and Hokusai's great waves. Interweaving the sexual and the political, the historical and the modern, the Western and the Japanese, A la Maison de M.Civeçawa (1966) was another bold declaration of Yokoo.

In 1967, Yokoo, together with Shūji Terayama and Higashi Yukata, co-founded the Tenjō Sajiki experimental theater troupe. Yokoo worked on several stage design projects as well as posters for various performances. Along with the founding of the troupe, Yokoo and Shuji Terayama collaborated on the latter's book, Throw Away Your Book, Let's Get into the Streets. Yokoo mainly contributed to the layout and illustrations of this book, which was regarded as a radical statement on its own.

Throughout the 1960s and 1970s, Yokoo also collaborated with musicians and designed albums, record covers, and concert posters for individuals and groups such as The Happenings Four, Takakura Ken, Ichiyanagi Toshi, Asaoka Ruriko, Hosono Haruomi and several international rock bands including Earth Wind and Fire, The Beatles, Carlos Santana, Emerson Lake and Palmer, Cat Stevens, and Tangerine Dream.

By the late 1960s he had achieved international recognition for his work and was included in the 1968 "Word & Image" exhibition at the Museum of Modern Art in New York. Four years later MoMA mounted a solo exhibition of his graphic work organized by Mildred Constantine. Yokoo collaborated extensively with Shūji Terayama and his theater Tenjō Sajiki. He starred as a protagonist in Nagisa Oshima's film Diary of a Shinjuku Thief.

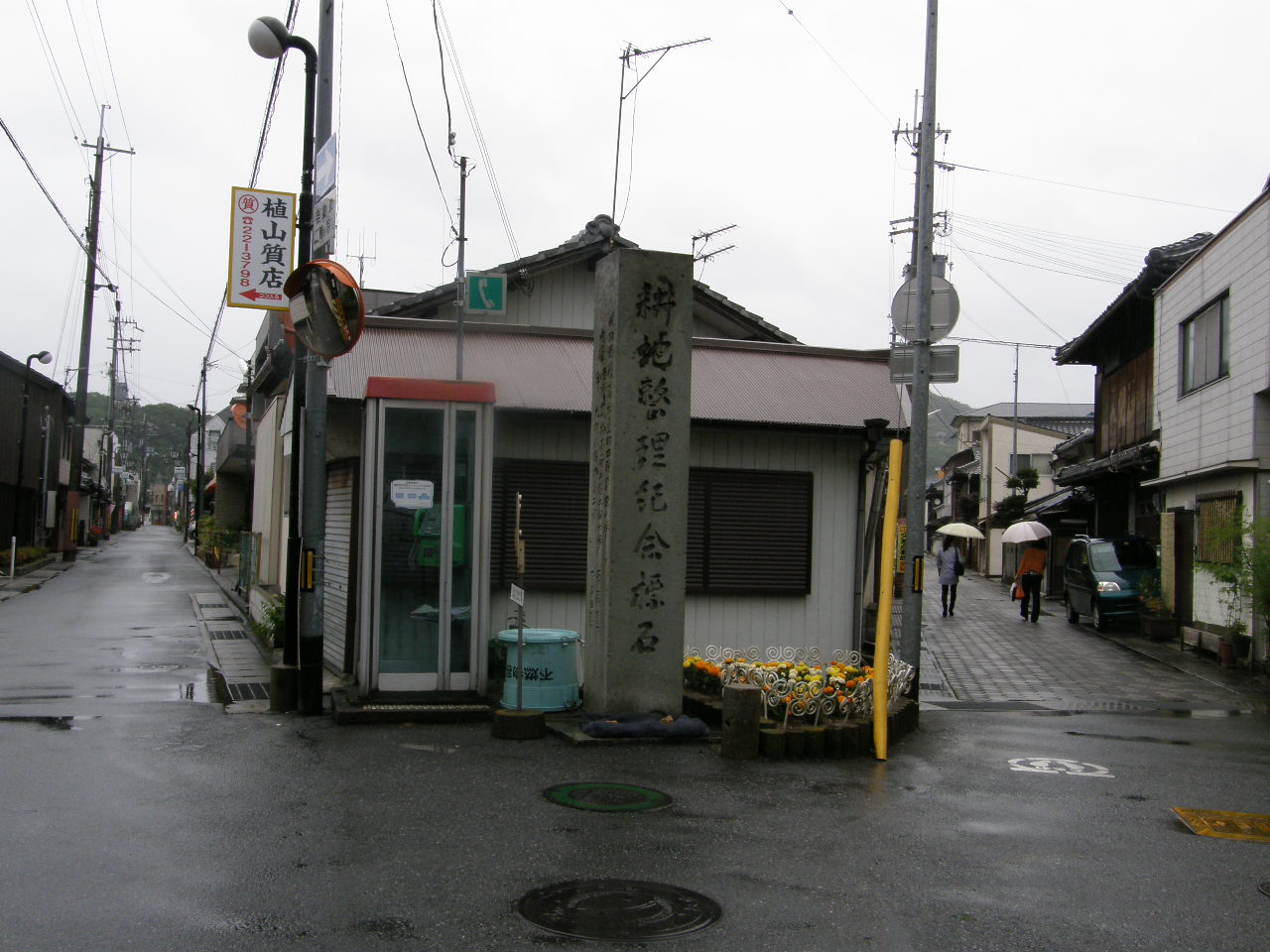
Nishiwaki-Three-way, Tadanori painting

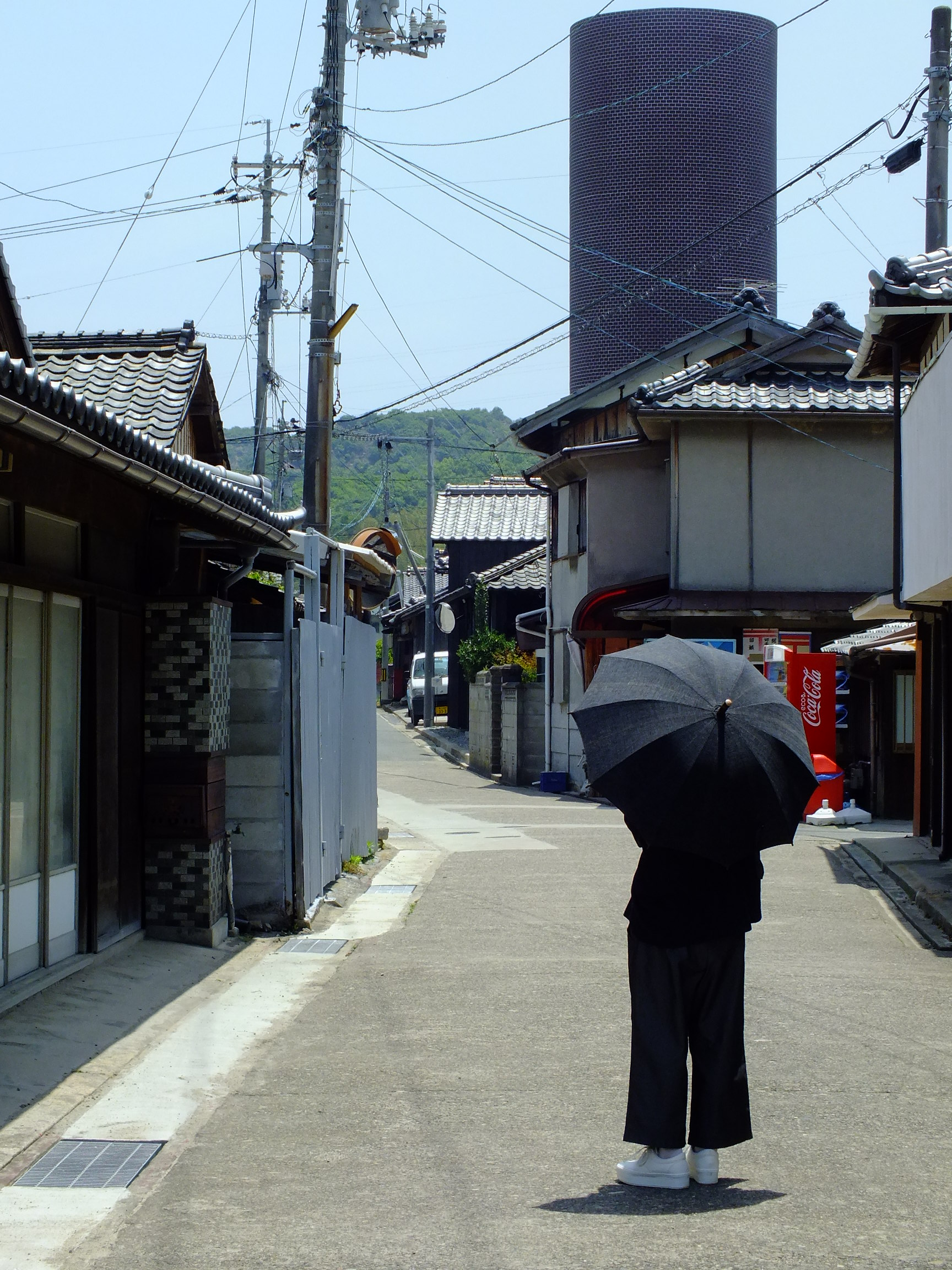
Setouchi Triennale, Teshima Yokoo House

In 1981 he unexpectedly "retired" from commercial work and took up painting after seeing a Picasso retrospective at the Museum of Modern Art (New York). He later designed the cover of Idea No. 183 (1984). His career as a fine artist continues to this day with exhibitions of his paintings every year. Alongside this, he remains fully engaged and prolific as a graphic designer.

== Exhibitions ==
- From Space to Environment, 1966
- Word and Image: Posters and Typography from the Graphic Design Collection of the Museum of Modern Art, 1879–1967, The Museum of Modern Art, 1968
- Graphics by Tadanori Yokoo, The Museum of Modern Art, 1972
- Tadanori Yokoo: River of Renga, 2025, Setagaya Art Museum

== See also ==
- Agharta (album)
- Cochin Moon
- Aquirax Uno
- Amigos (Santana album)
