= Masabumi Hosono =

RMS Titanic survivor (1870–1939)

- 細野 正文
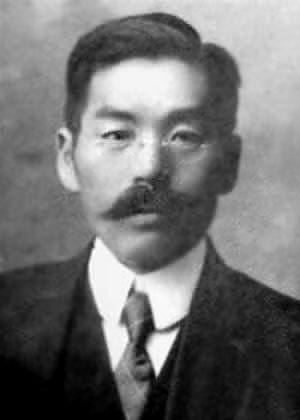
- Hosono in 1912
- Born: 15 October 1870; Hokura, Niigata, Empire of Japan (now Jōetsu, Niigata, Japan)
- Died: 14 March 1939 (aged 68); Tokyo, Empire of Japan
- Education: Tokyo Higher Commercial School
- Children: 4
- Relatives: Haruomi Hosono (grandson)

Masabumi Hosono (細野 正文, Hosono Masabumi; 15 October 1870 – 14 March 1939) was a Japanese civil servant. He survived the sinking of the Titanic on 15 April 1912 but found himself condemned and ostracized by the Japanese public, press, and government because of a misconception that he decided to save himself rather than go down with the ship. Hosono's grandson is Haruomi Hosono, leading member of the Japanese band Yellow Magic Orchestra.

== Early life and career ==
Masabumi Hosono was born on 15 October 1870, in the village of Hokura, now part of the city of Jōetsu, in Niigata Prefecture. In 1896, he graduated from the Tokyo Higher Commercial School (now Hitotsubashi University) and joined the Mitsubishi Joint Stock Company. In 1897, he left the company to work as a cargo clerk at the Shiodome Freight Terminal in Tokyo. In 1906, he completed a Russian language course at the Tokyo Language School (now the Tokyo University of Foreign Studies), and became a manager in the Accounting and Investigating Division of the Imperial Railroad Office the following year. In 1908, he became a railroad director.

In 1910, Hosono, working for the Ministry of Transport, was sent to Russia to research the Russian state railway system. His journey back to Japan took him first to London, where he stayed for a short time, then to Southampton where he boarded Titanic on 10 April 1912 as a second class passenger.

== The Titanic ==
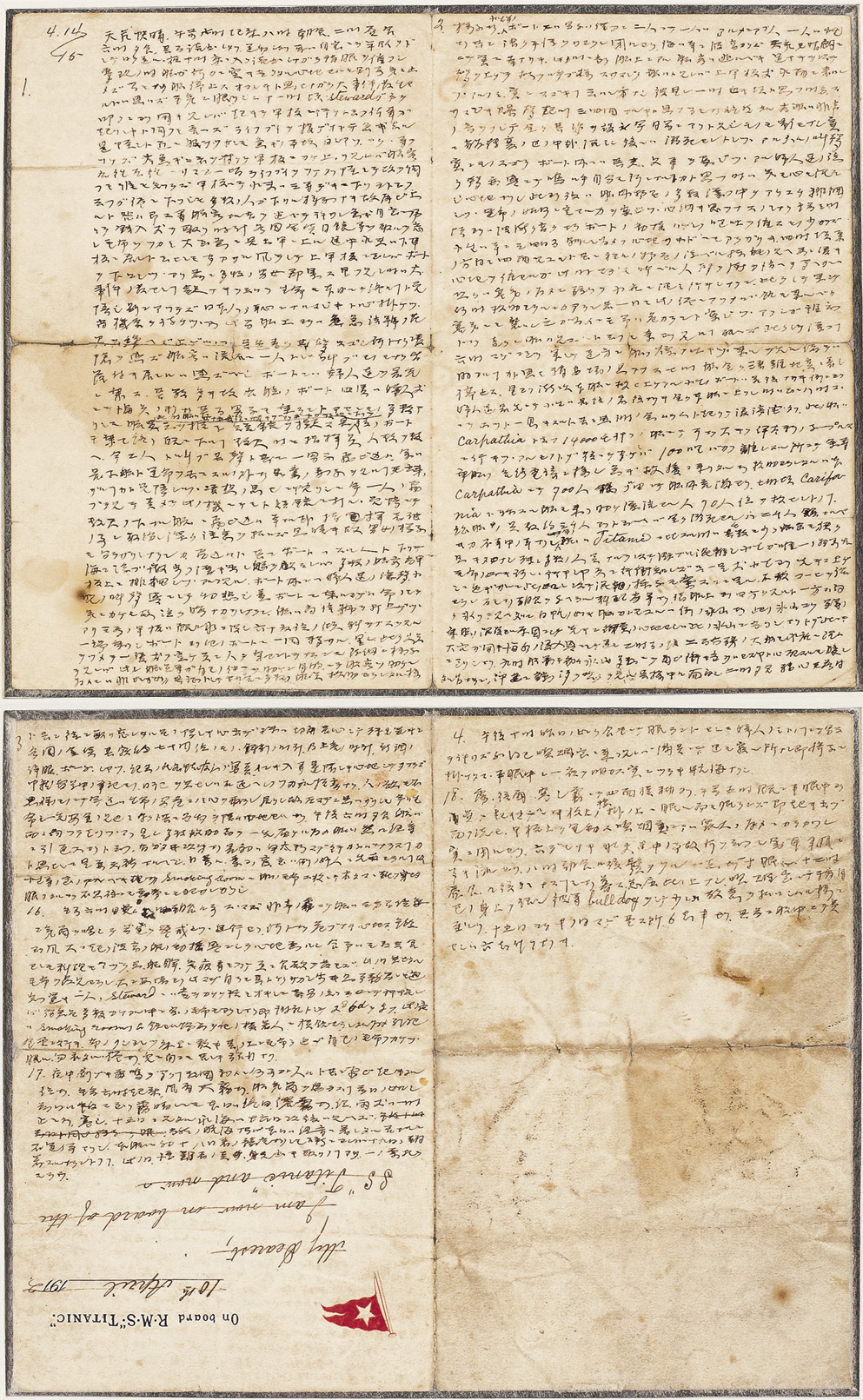
Masabumi Hosono's account of the sinking, written on Titanic-headed stationery. The day the Titanic set sail, he had begun writing a letter in English to his wife on the same paper; the scratched-out words are still visible at the bottom.

During the night of 14/15 April he was awakened by a steward. However, he was blocked from going to Titanic's boat deck, from which lifeboats were already being launched, as a crewman assumed that he was a third class passenger. He eventually made his way past the obstruction and made his way to the boat deck, where he saw with alarm that emergency flares were being fired: "All the while flares signalling emergency were being shot into the air ceaselessly, and hideous blue flashes and noises were simply terrifying. Somehow I could in no way dispel the feeling of utter dread and desolation."

Hosono saw four lifeboats being launched and contemplated the prospect of an imminent death. He was "deep in desolate thought that I would no more be able to see my beloved wife and children, since there was no alternative for me than to share the same destiny as the Titanic". As the number of lifeboats remaining diminished rapidly, "I tried to prepare myself for the last moment with no agitation, making up my mind not to leave anything disgraceful as a Japanese subject. But still I found myself looking for and waiting for any possible chance for survival."

沈ミシ後ニハ溺死セントシツツアル人々ノ叫声実ニモノスゴク、ボート内ニハ其夫父等ヲ案ジツツアル婦人連ノ泣ク声亦盛ニテ嗚呼自分モ何ウナルコトカト思フ時ハ気モ心モ沈ミシ心地ナリシ 。

After the ship sank there came back again frightful shrills and cries of those drowning in the water. Our lifeboat too was filled with sobbing, weeping children and women worried about the safety of their husbands and fathers. And I, too, was as much depressed and miserable as they were, not knowing what would become of myself in the long run.

At about 8 am on 15 April, the lifeboat's passengers were rescued by the RMS Carpathia. Once aboard, Hosono slept in the smoking room but avoided it when he could as he was the target of jokes by the seamen, whom he called "a good-for-nothing band of seamen" for whom "anything I say falls on deaf ears." He pushed back, showing them "a bulldog tenacity" and eventually gained what he called "a bit of respect". He still had in his coat pockets a sheaf of stationery with Titanic's letterhead on which he had started writing a letter to his wife in English. During Carpathia's voyage to New York, he used the paper to write an account in Japanese of his experiences. It is the only such document known to exist on Titanic stationery.

== Return to Japan ==
Hosono's story attracted little attention at first. He went to the offices of Mitsui in New York to ask friends for help to get him home. From there he travelled to San Francisco to find a ship back to Japan. A local newspaper heard of his story and dubbed him the "Lucky Japanese Boy". Back in Tokyo, he was interviewed by a number of magazines and newspapers including the daily Yomiuri Shimbun, which ran a photograph of him with his family.

According to a 1997 article released around the time of the blockbuster film Titanic, Hosono soon found himself the target of public condemnation. He was publicly condemned in the United States. He was described as a "stowaway" aboard lifeboat 10 by Archibald Gracie, who wrote a best-selling account of the disaster, while the crew member in charge of the boat, Able Seaman Edward Buley, told a US Senate inquiry that Hosono and the other man had disguised themselves as women in order to sneak aboard. This false accusation was not reported in Japan.

He lost his job and was condemned as a coward by the Japanese press. The 1997 article claimed that school textbooks described him as an example of how to be dishonourable and he was denounced as immoral by a professor of ethics. A 2007 reinvestigation by Andō Kenji, published in Shinchō 45, was unable to find any such textbooks. In any case, he was soon reemployed by the Ministry, as he was too valuable to lose, and continued to work there until his death in 1939.

Western academics who read the 1997 article put forth various explanations why Hosono encountered such a hostile reaction. It has been said that he was seen to have "betray[ed] the Samurai spirit of self-sacrifice". Another suggestion, from Jon P. Alston and Isao Takei, is that he was seen as having failed to show the expected conformity and was believed to have selfishly pushed aside other passengers to board the lifeboat. As a result, he was subjected to mura hachibu or ostracism. Margaret D. Mehl attributes his ostracism to the perception that he had embarrassed Japan; the "women and children first" protocol was not part of the Samurai code, but had instead come to Japan via the 1859 book Self Help by Samuel Smiles, which was a huge success in translation and proved enormously influential in introducing Western values to Japan. Mehl comments: "Hosono's failure to act as the Anglo-Saxon nations evidently expected their men to act caused embarrassment in Japan, but more because of the Japanese's acceptance of Western values than because of their own traditions." According to reports such as Shūkan Bunshun (18 December 1997 issue), in the book "The Loss of the SS. Titanic" published in 1912 by Englishman Lawrence Beesley, one of the survivors of the Titanic, Hosono was exposed to criticism from newspapers and textbooks at that time.

Kenji Andō's article concluded that there was nothing unusual about Hosono's treatment, which was sensationalized to fit a 1997 article accompanying the release of a Hollywood film, and it was actually no different from that of Western male survivors such as J. Bruce Ismay.

== Legacy ==
Long after his death, Hosono's story remained a source of shame for his family for decades. He never spoke of it himself, though his letter to his wife was published at least twice, soon after his death and later, in 1980, when an unsuccessful bid was mounted to find the wreck of Titanic. In the late 1990s, the Hosono family released the letter to the media in the wake of James Cameron's hugely successful 1997 film Titanic. Haruomi Hosono, Masabumi's grandson and leading member of the band Yellow Magic Orchestra, declared that he was "extremely relieved. Honour has been restored to the Hosonos." As Julian Stringer puts it, the letter "enables Haruomi to build a 'bridge' back to his grandfather's emotional life, and so reverse years of social disgrace, through the symbolic properties encrusted in its patina."

== Bibliography ==
- Alston, Jon P.; Takei, Isao (2005). Japanese Business Culture And Practices: A Guide to Twenty-first Century Japanese Business. iUniverse. ISBN 9780595355471.
- Higgins, Andrew (13 December 1997). "A testament to the will to live". The Guardian.
- Mehl, Margaret D. (25 November 2003). "The Last of the Last". Encyclopedia Titanica.
- Pellegrino, Charles (2012). Farewell, Titanic: Her Final Legacy. Hoboken, NJ: John Wiley & Sons. ISBN 978-0-470-87387-8.
- Stringer, Julian (1999). "The China Had Never Been Used!". In Sandler, Kevin S.; Studlar, Gaylyn (eds.). Titanic: Anatomy of a Blockbuster. New Brunswick, NJ: Rutgers University Press. ISBN 9780813526690.
- Wormstedt, Bill; Fitch, Tad (2011). "An Account of the Saving of Those on Board". In Halpern, Samuel (ed.). Report into the Loss of the SS Titanic: A Centennial Reappraisal. Stroud, UK: The History Press. ISBN 978-0-7524-6210-3.
- Ando, Kenji 安藤健二 (March 2007). "タイタニックで助かった日本人の謎". 新潮45. 26 (3): 98–105.
