= Esashi oiwake music =

Esashi oiwake (江差追分, "Esashi crossroads") is a folk song from the Japanese island of Hokkaidō. It started in the town of Esashi in Hiyama Subprefecture.

The song consists of three sections:

- Mae-uta (beginning song);
- Hon-uta (main part or original song)
- Ato-uta (final song)

== Origins ==
Oiwake was originally a horseman's song (mago-uta) from Oiwake village in Nagano Prefecture but spread throughout Japan during the Edo period. Once in Esashi, the melody was modified and also enlarged by adding starting and ending sections.

The song's lyrics changed, describing nature, customs and fishing in Esashi instead of a horseman's life in the mountains. This is reflected in fishing lyrics:

- 「ニシン来たかとカモメに問えば」
- Ask the seagull if the herring have come?

The Japanese Shakuhachi flute accompanies the singing, which has a free rhythm rather than a mechanical, fitted meter. In Esashi, the song was originally just called Oiwake Bushi (bushi = melody, song), but the song was so popular with visitors that the prefix 'Esashi' was added as part of the town's efforts to reinvent itself as a tourism destination at the end of the 19th century after local herring fisheries failed.

As part of that process, the local dignitaries, under the influence of Western classical music, urged local singers to agree on just one version with no variation of melody or ornaments (though hundreds of verses are sung). After many decades and the creation of a detailed local notation, indeed a single version has been accepted and must be the one sung at the annual national contest.

The national contest for this single song has been held in Esashi since 1963. Contestants (now numbering over 400) sing just the main song. A search for "Esashi Oiwake" on YouTube will yield many videos from the contest, as well as showing how a teacher will point to the notation when teaching.
