= Miharu Koshi =

Japanese singer and musician (born 1960)

Miharu Koshi コシミハル
- Born: 3 January 1960 (age 66)
- Genres: Electronic, J‑pop, Synthpop
- Occupations: Musician, Songwriter
- Years active: 1979–present

Miharu Koshi (コシミハル, Koshi Miharu; born January 3, 1960) is a Japanese singer and musician. Her career started in the late 1970s performing Japanese new music. By the mid-1980s she was performing music with electronic instruments, with many albums produced by Haruomi Hosono. Her later work has led to European classical music, French chanson and early 20th-century European Jazz, which she sings in several languages (most often French).

== Discography ==
=== Albums ===
- おもちゃ箱 第一幕 (1979)
- On The Street (1980)
- Make Up (1981)
- Tutu (1983, collaborated with Telex)
- Parallelisme (1984)
- Boy Soprano (1985)
- Echo De Miharu (1987)
- Passepied (1989)
- 心臓の上 (1990)
- 父とピストル Der Vater und die Pistole (1991)
- 希望の泉 Source d' espoir (1992)
- La Voix De Paris (1992)
- Chanson Solaire (1995)
- Swing Slow (with Haruomi Hosono) (1996)
- Rodéo De Paris (1997)
- L'Assassinat De La Rue Du Pélican (2000)
- Frou-Frou (2001)
- Corset (2003)
- Le Judas (2008)
- Madame Crooner (2013)
- Moonray (2015)
- Voyage Secret = 秘密の旅 (2021)

=== Singles and EPs ===
- ラブ・ステップ (1978)
- 気まぐれハイウェイ (1979)
- L'Amour Toujours (1983, collaborated with Telex)
- Petit Paradis (Just Around The Corner) (1983)
- Heidenröslein (1985)
- Ave Maria (1985)
- シチリアーノ (1989)
- マドンナ (1991)
- ボンジュール・クク (1992)

=== Compilations ===
- オートポルトレ = Autoportrait (1998)
- Époque de Techno (2009)
