= Roland TR-808 =

Drum machine

TR-808
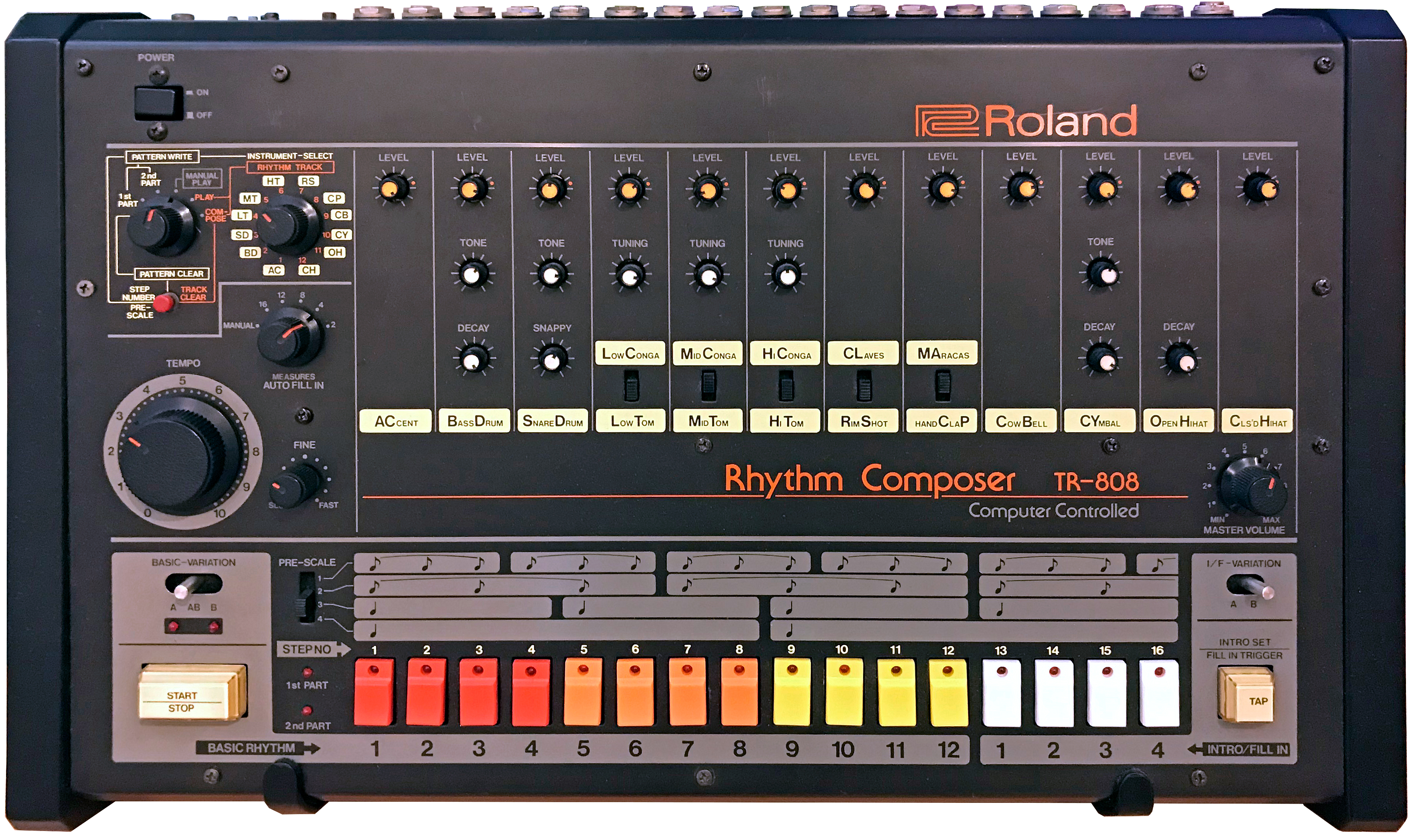
- Front panel
- Manufacturer: Roland
- Dates: 1980–1983
- Price: US$1,195 £765 ¥150,000 JPY

Technical specifications
- Polyphony: 12
- Timbrality: 12
- Synthesis type: Analog subtractive
- Storage memory: 32 patterns, 768 measures
- Effects: Individual level, tuning, attack, decay, and tone controls for some sounds

Input/output
- Keyboard: 16 pattern keys
- External control: DIN sync in/out

The Roland TR-808 Rhythm Composer, commonly known as the 808, is a drum machine manufactured by Roland Corporation between 1980 and 1983. It was one of the first drum machines to allow users to program rhythms instead of using preset patterns. Unlike its nearest competitor at the time, the more expensive Linn LM-1, the 808 generates sounds using analog synthesis rather than by playing samples.

The 808 was a commercial failure, as electronic music had yet to become mainstream and many producers wanted more realistic drum sounds. After building approximately 12,000 units, Roland discontinued the 808 after its semiconductors became impossible to restock. It was succeeded by the TR-909 in 1983.

Over the course of the 1980s, the 808 attracted a cult following among underground musicians for its affordability on the used market, ease of use and idiosyncratic sounds, particularly its deep, booming bass drum. It became a cornerstone of the emerging electronic, dance and hip-hop genres, popularized by early hits such as "Planet Rock" by Afrika Bambaataa and the Soulsonic Force and "Sexual Healing" by Marvin Gaye.

The 808 was eventually used on more hit records than any other drum machine. Its popularity in hip-hop has made it one of the most influential inventions in popular music, comparable to the Fender Stratocaster's impact on rock. Its sounds are included with music software and modern drum machines and it has inspired unlicensed recreations.

== Background ==
In the 1960s, drum machines were most often used to accompany home organs. They did not allow users to program rhythms, but instead offered preset patterns such as bossa nova. In 1969, the Hammond Organ Company hired the American musician and engineer Don Lewis to demonstrate its products, including an electronic organ with a built-in drum machine designed by the Japanese company Ace Tone. Lewis was known for performances using electronic instruments he had modified, decades before the popularization of instrument hacking via circuit bending. He made extensive modifications to the Ace Tone drum machine, creating his own rhythms and wiring it through his organ's expression pedal to accent the percussion.

Lewis was approached by Ikutaro Kakehashi, the president and founder of Ace Tone, who wanted to know how he had achieved the sounds using the Ace Tone machine. In 1972, Kakehashi formed the Roland Corporation and hired Lewis to help design drum machines. By the late 1970s, microprocessors were appearing in instruments such as the Roland MC-8 Microcomposer, and Kakehashi realized they could be used to program drum machines. In 1978, Roland released the CompuRhythm CR-78, the first drum machine with which users could write, save and replay their own patterns.

== Development ==
The TR-808 is a piece of art. It's engineering art, it's so beautifully made. If you have an idea of what is going on in the inside, if you look at the circuit diagram, and you see how the unknown Roland engineer was making the best out of super limited technology, it's unbelievable. You look at the circuit diagram like you look at an orchestral score, you think, how on earth did they come up with this idea? It's brilliant, it's a masterpiece.

— Robert Henke, musician and co-creator of Ableton Live

With its next machine, the TR-808, Roland aimed to develop a drum machine for the professional market, expecting that it would mainly be used to create demos. The team was led by the chief engineer Tadao Kikumoto. Makoto Muroi was a chief engineer, Hiro Nakamura was responsible for designing the voice circuits that generate the sounds, and Hisanori Matsuoka was responsible for developing the software and engineering hardware.

Kakehashi and Lewis asked the team to produce an inexpensive machine that would play realistic drum sounds. Due to the cost of memory chips, instead of using pulse-code modulation to play samples of percussion, Kikumoto instead proposed a "drum synthesizer" that would generate sounds using analog synthesis. They aimed to allow users to program sequences and edit parameters such as tuning, decay and level. Kakehashi deliberately purchased faulty transistors to create the 808's distinctive sizzling sound.

== Sounds and features ==
Various patterns
Various patterns played by a TR-808

Accent trigger
A recording of the TR-808, with the accent trigger used in a musical context

Cowbell trigger
A recording of the TR-808, with the cowbell trigger controlling the sequencer of a Roland JX-3P synthesizer

The 808 imitates acoustic percussion: the bass drum, snare, toms, conga, rimshot, claves, handclap, maraca, cowbell, cymbal and hi-hat (open and closed). Rather than playing samples, it generates sounds using analog synthesis; the TR in TR-808 stands for "transistor rhythm". The sounds do not resemble real percussion, and have been described as "clicky", "robotic", "spacey", "toy-like" and "futuristic". Fact described them as a combination of synthesizer tones and white noise that resemble "bursts coming from the BBC Radiophonic Workshop" more than a real drum kit. In Music Technology, Tim Goodyer described the cowbell as "clumsy, clonky and hopelessly underpitched".

The 808 is noted for its powerful bass drum sound, built from a sine oscillator, low-pass filter and voltage-controlled amplifier. The bass drum decay control allows users to lengthen the sound, creating uniquely low frequencies that flatten slightly over time, possibly not by design. The New Yorker described the bass drum as the 808's defining feature.

The 808 was the first drum machine with which users could program a percussion track from beginning to end, complete with breaks and rolls. Users can program up to 32 patterns using the step sequencer, chain up to 768 measures and place accents on individual beats. Users can also set the tempo and time signature, including unusual signatures such as 5/4 and 7/8. The 808 includes volume knobs for each voice, numerous audio outputs and a DIN sync port (a precursor to MIDI) to synchronize with other devices. Its three trigger outputs can synchronize with synthesizers and other equipment.

== Release ==
The 808 launched in 1980 with a list price of US$1,195 (equivalent to $4,669 in 2025). Roland marketed it as an affordable alternative to the Linn LM-1, manufactured by Linn Electronics, which used samples of real drum kits. The 808 sounded simplistic and synthetic by comparison; electronic music had yet to become mainstream and many musicians and producers wanted realistic-sounding drum machines. According to many reports, one review dismissed the 808 as sounding like "marching anteaters", though this likely referred to machines that predated it. Contemporary Keyboard wrote a positive review, predicting that it would become "the standard for rhythm machines of the future".

Despite some early adopters, the 808 was a commercial failure and fewer than 12,000 units were sold. Roland ended production in 1983 after semiconductor improvements made it impossible to restock the faulty transistors essential to its design.

== Uses and influence ==
Marvin Gaye – "Sexual Healing" (1982)
"Sexual Healing" (1982) by Marvin Gaye, an R&B song that helped popularize the 808

Before its release, Roland rented an 808 to the Japanese group Yellow Magic Orchestra (YMO), who used it at a 1980 performance of "1000 Knives" at the Budokan. In the same year, the YMO member Ryuichi Sakamoto used the 808 on his solo album B-2 Unit. Later in 1980, the 808 was used in an Indian disco album, Babla's Disco Sensation, by Babla.

In 1981, the 808 was featured on the YMO album BGM and the single "Nobody Told Me" by the Monitors. In 1982, the American R&B artist Marvin Gaye released the first US hit single to feature the 808, "Sexual Healing". Gaye was drawn to the 808 because he could use it to create music in isolation, without other musicians or producers.

Though the 808 was unsuccessful, it was eventually used on more hit records than any other drum machine and became one of the most influential inventions in popular music. By the time Roland discontinued it in 1983, it had become common on the used market, often selling for less than $100 (equivalent to $323 in 2025). Its ease of use, affordability and idiosyncratic sound earned it a cult following among underground musicians and producers, and it became a cornerstone of the developing electronic and hip-hop genres.

808 samples are common in music software, and it has inspired numerous unlicensed clones. Flavorwire wrote that the 808 is now so ubiquitous that "its beats are almost a language of their own", with sounds recognizable even to listeners who do not know what drum machines are, and that "you also notice when somebody messes with them or uses them in unusual contexts". In 2019, DJ Mag wrote that it was likely the most used drum machine of the preceding 40 years.

=== Hip-hop ===
The 808 is a foundational element of hip-hop. It been described as hip-hop's equivalent to the Fender Stratocaster guitar, which dramatically influenced the development of rock music. It was used by pioneering hip-hop acts including Run-DMC, LL Cool J and Public Enemy. The 808 bass drum became so essential that Hank Shocklee of the Bomb Squad production group declared that "it's not hip-hop without that sound". The New Yorker wrote that the "trembling feeling of [the 808 bass drum], booming down boulevards in Oakland, the Bronx and Detroit, are part of America's cultural DNA". Even after the 808 fell out of use by East Coast hip-hop producers in the 1990s, it remained a staple of Southern hip-hop.

The rapper Kanye West used the 808 on every track on his 2008 solo album 808s & Heartbreak, which Slate described as "an explicit love letter to the device". In 2015, The New Yorker wrote that the 808 was the bedrock of the modern "urban-youth-culture soundtrack", particularly in trap music, and had influenced a new blend of dance and retro hip-hop that "embraces and fetishizes ... street music from the past".

Hip-hop artists pushed the limits of the 808's limited pattern storage. According to Slate, "Those eight-bar units became veritable playgrounds for invention and creativity." Artists manipulated the bass drum to produce new sounds, such as on the 1984 single "Set it Off", in which the producer Strafe used it to imitate the sound of an underground nuclear test. The producer Rick Rubin popularized the technique of lengthening the bass drum decay and tuning it to different pitches to create basslines. The Beastie Boys used a reversed recording of an 808 on their 1986 track "Paul Revere".

=== Electronic music ===
In 1980, Ryuichi Sakamoto's electronic track "Riot in Lagos" from the album B-2 Unit introduced the 808 to clubs. According to Mary Anne Hobbs of BBC Radio 6 Music, it demonstrated a new type of "body music" that "foretold the future" of music. In 1982, Afrika Bambaataa and the Soulsonic Force released their single "Planet Rock", which used the 808 to create "strange, futuristic" percussion that was popular in clubs. The track influenced the development of electronic and hip-hop music and subgenres including Miami bass and Detroit techno, and popularized the 808 as a "fundamental element of futuristic sound". According to Slate, "Planet Rock" "didn't so much put the 808 on the map so much as reorient an entire world of post-disco dance music around it".

The British electronic group 808 State took its name from the 808 and used it extensively. 808 State's Graham Massey said: "The Roland gear began to be a kind of Esperanto in music. The whole world began to be less separated through this technology, and there was a classiness to it—you could transcend your provincial music with this equipment." With the rise of acid house and rave culture, the 808 became a staple sound on British radio. In the early 90s, the Japanese composer Yuzo Koshiro incorporated samples of the 808 in his soundtracks for the Streets of Rage games.

=== Pop ===
The 808 has been used extensively in pop. The New Yorker wrote that it triggered "the big bang of pop's great age of disruption, from 1983 to 1986", and that its "defiantly inorganic timbres ... sketched out the domain of a new world of music". According to Slate, it was instrumental in pop music's shift from conventional structure and harmonic progression to "thinking in terms of sequences, discrete passages of sound and time to be repeated and revised ad infinitum".

The Argentine artist Charly García used the 808 for all percussion on his second album, Clics modernos (1983). In the 1984 Talking Heads concert film Stop Making Sense, the singer David Byrne performs "Psycho Killer" accompanied by an 808, stumbling against its "gunshot"-like sounds. The drummer and songwriter Phil Collins found the 808 useful for looping rhythms for long periods, as human drummers would be tempted to add variations and fills. Whitney Houston's 1987 single "I Wanna Dance With Somebody (Who Loves Me)" makes extensive use of the 808.

Other artists who have used the 808 include Damon Albarn, Diplo, Fatboy Slim, David Guetta and New Order. It has been referenced in lyrics by artists including the Beastie Boys, Beck, Outkast, Kelis, TI, Lil Wayne, Britney Spears, Beyoncé, R Kelly and Robbie Williams. Its bass drum has been used as a metaphor for a heartbeat in songs by artists including Madonna, Rihanna and Kesha.

== Successors ==
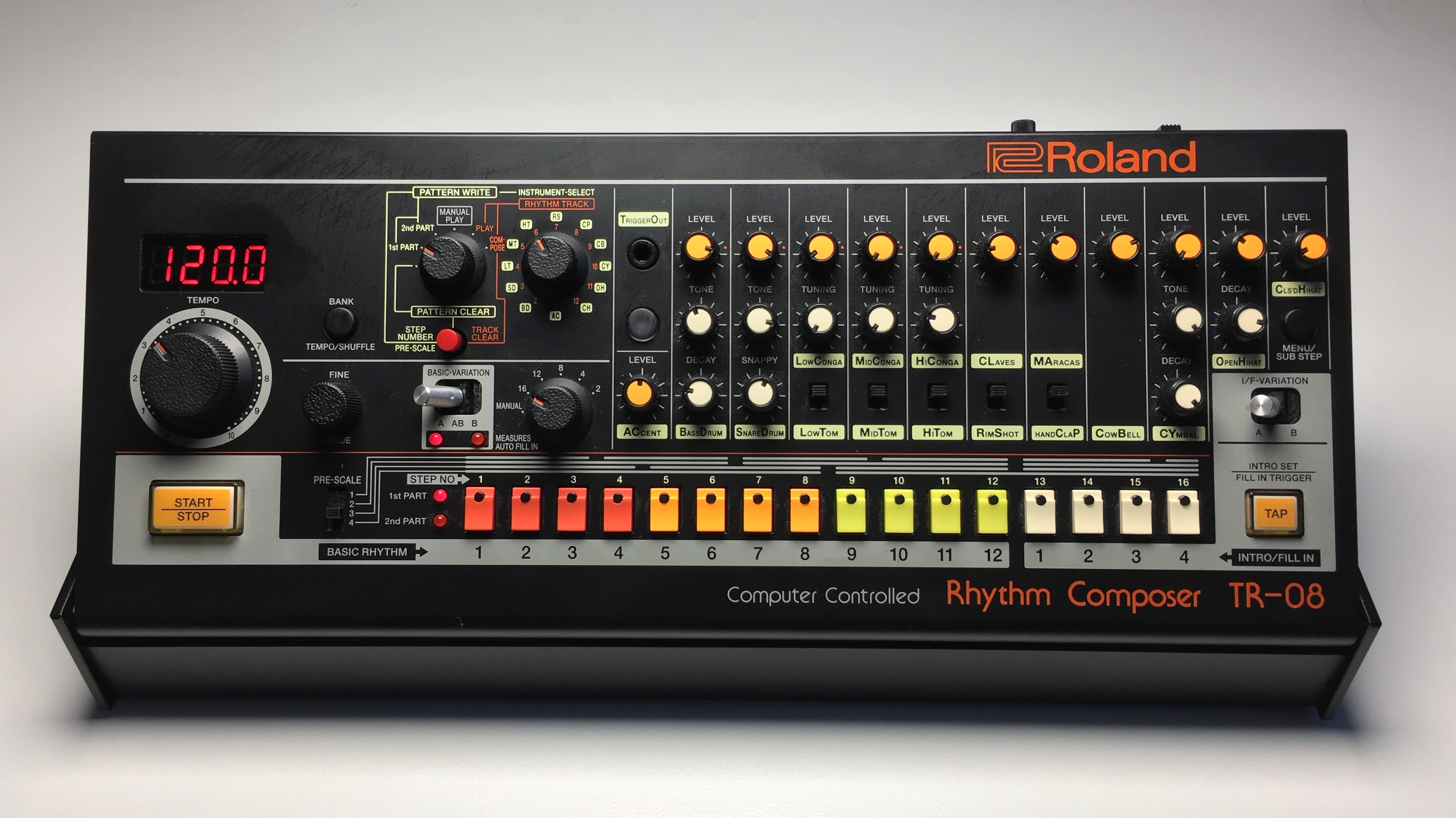
The TR-08, a miniaturized 808 reissue released in 2017

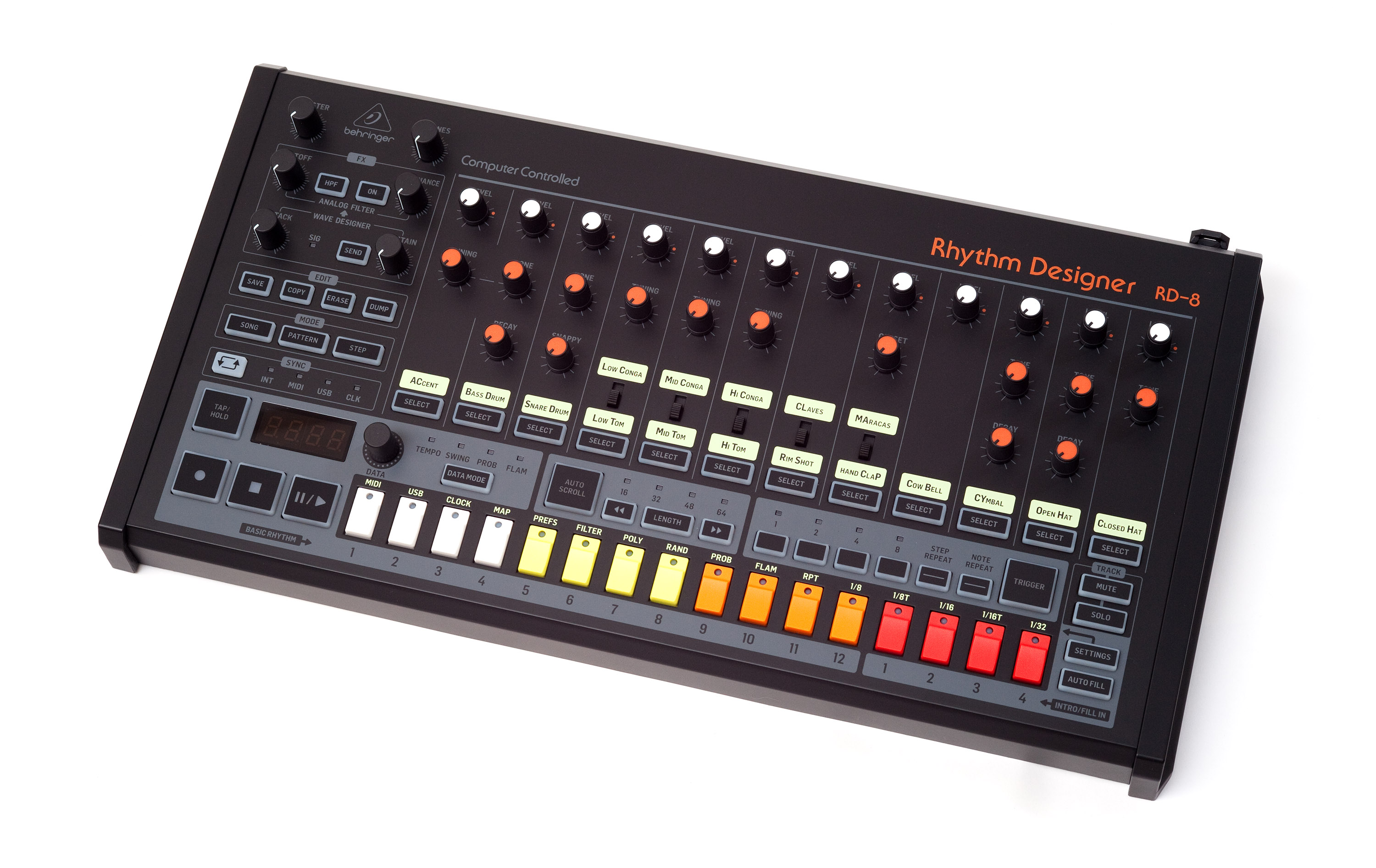
The RD-8 Rhythm Designer, a clone released by Behringer in 2019

The 808 was followed in 1983 by the TR-909, the first Roland drum machine to use samples. Like the 808, the 909 influenced popular music, including genres such as techno, house and acid.

808 samples were included in ReBirth RB-338, an early software synthesiser developed by Propellerhead Software. According to Andy Jones of MusicTech, ReBirth was "especially incredible" as the first software emulation of 808 sounds. It was retired in 2017 as Roland said it infringed on its intellectual property. Roland has included 808 samples in several drum machines, including its Grooveboxes in the 1990s.

In 2017, Roland released the TR-08, a miniaturized 808 featuring an LED display, MIDI and USB connections, expanded sequencer control and a built-in speaker. This was followed by the TR-8S in 2018 and both use Roland's Analog Circuit Behavior (ACB) to recreate the sound of the 808. While the TR-08 retains the sound, character and user interface of the original 808, the TR-8S recreates the CR-78, TR-606, TR-707, TR-727 and TR-909 with a new user interface.

Roland released the first official software emulations of the 808 and 909 in 2018. In 2019, Behringer released a recreation of the 808, the Behringer RD-8 Rhythm Designer which uses analog circuitry.

The TR-6S, released in 2020, is a simplified version of the TR-8S but features a similar engine which models the CR-78, TR-606, TR-707, TR-727, TR-808 and TR-909 using ACB technology.

In 2025, Roland released the TR-1000, its first drum machine to use analog synthesis in 40 years, including analog recreation of 808 sounds.

== See also ==
- 808 (film) – a 2015 documentary about the Roland TR-808
