= Band Wagon (album) =

1975 studio album by Shigeru Suzuki

Studio album by Shigeru Suzuki
- Released: March 25, 1975
- Recorded: October 28 – November 28, 1974
- Studios: Different Fur in San Francisco and Clover Studio in Hollywood
- Genres: Rock, funk
- Label: Panam/Crown
- Producer: Shigeru Suzuki

Shigeru Suzuki chronology
Band Wagon (1975)	Lagoon (1976)

Band Wagon is the debut solo album of Japanese musician Shigeru Suzuki, released by Panam/Crown on March 25, 1975. It was recorded in Los Angeles, California with American musicians. Two singles were released from the album, "Hachigatsu no Nioi"/"Snow Express" and "100-Watt Koibito", both in 1975.

== Background and recording ==
Shigeru Suzuki's first solo album followed the disbanding of Happy End and the formation of Tin Pan Alley with Haruomi Hosono and Masataka Matsutoya. He said that when Hosono produced his first solo album, it led to him wanting to create one of his own. Suzuki said the plan was to give form to the musical ideas he had left unfinished from high school, when he listened to British bands such as Traffic, Procol Harum and The Yardbirds. Stating that this would require musicians who could only play rock, he went to America without consulting his Tin Pan Alley bandmates. Band Wagon had a production budget of 6.4 million yen. It was recorded in Los Angeles because studio rental fees were cheaper in America than in Japan.

The album features American musicians from notable acts such as Little Feat, Santana and Sly and the Family Stone. Suzuki had previously worked with Bill Payne, Dick Hyde and Kirby Johnson on Happy End's final album. He had originally requested James Jamerson, Chuck Rainey, Jim Gordon and James Gadson for Band Wagon, but learned none of them were available upon landing in California. After a week wandering around Hollywood with nothing to do, Suzuki received a phone call saying that Doug Rauch wanted to play with him. Rauch booked Suzuki a recording studio and introduced him to Greg Errico with whom he had played in David Bowie's backing band on the Diamond Dogs Tour. "If I had ended up with bass players like Jamerson or Rainey, the album might have taken on a slightly 'thicker' or denser sound. I truly believe that the fact that Band Wagon ultimately settled into that rock-oriented sound is entirely thanks to Doug Rauch."

Suzuki described the recording process, "the musicians would, in a sense, 'paint a picture' over my songs—instantly weaving in their own unique ideas and contributions—until all the individual pieces came together to form a single, cohesive work of art." He also stated he wanted to use as little overdubs as possible. After recording most of the album at Different Fur in San Francisco, Suzuki learned that Little Feat had returned from tour and so moved operations to Clover Studio in Hollywood in order to work with them, where they recorded "Snow Express" and "Yūyake Hatoba". Engineer Mike Boshears balanced the material recorded in the different studios so they would have a cohesive sound. Suzuki used a MXR Dyna Comp for his guitar playing.

Suzuki's Happy End bandmate Takashi Matsumoto wrote the lyrics to all of the songs on Band Wagon. Matsumoto said that Suzuki gave him free rein, and that he wrote the lyrics a bit like the ones he had written for their former band. Because he was recording in America, Suzuki would convey a song to Matsumoto in Japan, such as the melodies and number of words he wanted, via long-distance telephone call, then wait about a week for Matsumoto to relay the lyrics to him the same way. The lyricist said him doing this for just the lyrics to only a single song would incur a phone bill of ¥50,000 to ¥60,000. Suzuki cited his Happy End bandmate Eiichi Ohtaki as his vocal role model, saying his work helped him explore and discover his own singing style. "I felt that if I could combine my guitar playing with a vocal line, the result would be something interesting."

"Suna no Onna" was one of four songs on the album that began with Matsumoto's lyrics. After attending George Harrison's 1974 North American tour, Suzuki composed the music while playing Harrison's "My Sweet Lord" on guitar. The album uses the very first take of the song, recorded after a single rehearsal. When drummer David Garibaldi perceived a mistake in his drum fill right before the vocals come in, they recorded two more takes, but Suzuki insisted on using the first due to its momentum and energy. Matsumoto cited it as his favorite song.

== Release ==
Band Wagon was released on March 25, 1975. In 2008, the album was remixed under Suzuki's supervision and released on CD with 10 bonus tracks. Band Wagon and four other Suzuki albums were uploaded to digital music platforms worldwide on October 9, 2010.

Band Wagon -50th Anniversary- 2025 was released on March 25, 2025, exactly 50 years after the original. The 2-disc version features a standard CD of the original album newly remastered under Suzuki's supervision, and a Blu-ray audio disc of the new remaster plus the 2008 edition of the album. The latter includes the bonus tracks, plus four further bonus tracks originally left off of the 2008 edition. The 2025 version was also released on colored vinyl and on cassette. The Crown Music Store offered a limited-edition version between March 25 and April 30, which featured 32 high-resolution digital audio tracks bundled with a bag featuring the album's artwork that was autographed by Suzuki.

== Reception ==
Band Wagon is considered Suzuki's signature work and a masterpiece in Japanese rock. In a retrospective for Billboard Japan, Hitoshi Kurimoto strongly praised its "sense of groove", writing that "Binetsu Shōnen" and "100-Watt no Koibito" contain a funk sound reminiscent of Tower of Power that is thoroughly steeped in the American West Coast atmosphere of the era. He noted Band Wagon also features stylistic surprises, such as the horn-driven, Southern rock-flavored "Ginga Rhapsody", and "Yūyake Hatoba", which he described as adopting the New Orleans sound popularized by Little Feat. Kurimoto found the two instrumental tracks to effectively showcase Suzuki's distinct style of guitar playing, and opined that his slide guitar work on the record rivals that of his idol, Lowell George.

== Tour and live recordings ==
To tour the record, Suzuki formed the band Huckleback (ハックルバック; sometimes written as "Hucklebuck"), consisting of keyboardist Hiroshi Sato, bassist Akihiro Tanaka, and drummer Toshiaki Hayashi. The group played around 10 shows, before disbanding on November 16, 1975.

Live recordings from the tour appear on 2008's Shigeru Suzuki History Box - Crown Years 1974–1979 box set. In 2014, Suzuki performed Band Wagon in its entirety for his Get Back Sessions Special "Band Wagon" Live concert video. It peaked at number 272 on Oricon's DVD chart. A 2-disc live album recorded during the original 1975 tour on April 4 and May 15 was released on September 23, 2015, under the title 1975 Live.

== Track listing ==
All lyrics are written by Takashi Matsumoto; all music is composed by Shigeru Suzuki.

Side A
No.	Title	Length
1.	"Suna no Onna" (砂の女, 'Woman in the Dunes')	3:55
2.	"Hachigatsu no Nioi" (八月の匂い, 'Smell of August')	3:38
3.	"Binetsu Shōnen" (微熱少年, 'Low-fever Boy')	3:40
4.	"Snow Express" (スノー・エクスプレス, Sunō Ekusupuresu, Instrumental)	3:51

Side B
No.	Title	Length
5.	"Jinryoku Hikōki no Yoru" (人力飛行機の夜, 'The Night of Man-powered Aircraft')	2:33
6.	"100-Watt no Koibito" (100ワットの恋人, 100-Watto no Koibito, '100-Watt Lover')	4:36
7.	"Wood Pecker" (ウッド・ペッカー, Uddo Pekkā, Instrumental)	3:08
8.	"Yūyake Hatoba" (夕焼け波止場, 'Sunset Wharf')	4:45
9.	"Ginga Rhapsody" (銀河ラプソディー, Ginga Rapusodī, 'Galaxy Rhapsody')	3:48

2008 bonus tracks
No.	Title	Length
10.	"GaGaKu" (Previously Unreleased, Instrumental)	2:31
11.	"Hachigatsu no Nioi" (Outtake-Backing Track)	5:09
12.	"Binetsu Shōnen" (Outtake-Backing Track)	5:10
13.	"Snow Express" (Outtake)	3:09
14.	"Yūyake Hatoba" (Outtake-Backing Track)	5:40
15.	"Suna no Onna" (Unedited Long Version)	4:41
16.	"Hachigatsu no Nioi" (Unedited Long Version)	3:52
17.	"100-Watt Lover" (Unedited Long Version)	5:52
18.	"Wood Pecker" (Unedited Long Version)	4:28
19.	"Ginga Rhapsody" (Unedited Long Version)	4:14

2025 additional bonus tracks
No.	Title	Length
26.	"Binetsu Shōnen" (Unedited Long Version)	4:26
27.	"Snow Express" (Unedited Long Version)	4:24
28.	"Jinryoku Hikōki no Yoru" (Unedited Long Version)	2:57
31.	"Yūyake Hatoba" (Unedited Long Version)	5:59

== Personnel ==
According to 2008 re-release CD booklet:

- Shigeru Suzuki – all vocals & guitar, string synthesizer on track 9
- Bill Payne – acoustic piano on tracks 2, 5, 6, 8 & 9, electric piano on tracks 3 & 4
- Don Grusin – keyboards on tracks 1 & 7, clavinet on track 3
- Wendy Haas – clavinet on tracks 5 & 6, string synthesizer on track 6
- Doug Rauch – bass on tracks 1–3, 5–7 & 9
- Ken Gradney – bass on tracks 4 & 8
- Greg Errico – drums on tracks 3, 5, 6 & 9
- David Garibaldi – drums on tracks 1, 2 & 7
- Richie Hayward – drums on tracks 4 & 8
- Sam Clayton – congas on tracks 4 & 8
- Gene Goe – trumpet on track 2
- Pete Christlieb – tenor saxophone on track 2
- Dick Slyde Hyde – trombone on tracks 2
- Kirby Johnson – horn arrangements on tracks 2, 3, 7 & 9

Technical

- Dane Butcher – engineer
- Mike Boshears – recording engineer
- Bernie Grundman – mastering engineer

== See also ==
- 1975 in Japanese music
