= Happy End =

Happy End may refer to:

== Music ==
- Happy End (musical), a 1929 musical play co-written by Bertolt Brecht and Elisabeth Hauptmann, with music by Kurt Weill
- Happy End (band), a Japanese folk rock group of the early 1970s
  - Happy End (1970 album), written はっぴいえんど, their debut album
  - Happy End (1973 album), their third album
- "Happy End", a song by Sakerock from Life Cycle (2005)
- Happy End, 2010 album by Rick & Renner

== Film ==
- Happy End (1967 film), a Czech film
- Happy End (1999 film), a Korean film, directed by Jung Ji-woo starring Choi Min-shik, Jeon Do-yeon, and Ju Jin-moo
- Happy End (2003 film), a French film directed by Amos Kollek
- Happy End (2009 film), a French film directed by Arnaud and Jean-Marie Larrieu
- Happy End (2017 film), a French film directed by Michael Haneke
- Happyend, a Japanese film written and directed by Neo Sora

== See also ==
- Happy ending (disambiguation)
- The Happy End Problem, a 2006 album by Fred Frith
- Happy of the End, a manga series
