= Motoharu Sano =

- Also known as: Lion, Moto, Tōryō (棟梁)
- Born: March 13, 1956 (age 70); Taitō, Tokyo, Japan
- Genres: Rock; folk rock
- Occupations: Singer-songwriter; musician; record producer
- Instruments: Vocals; guitar; piano
- Years active: 1980–present
- Labels: Epic/Sony; Daisy Music
- Website: https://www.moto.co.jp

Motoharu Sano (佐野 元春; born March 13, 1956, in Taitō, Tokyo) is a Japanese singer-songwriter and musician. A graduate of Rikkyo University, Sano is a frontman with a history of performing in several bands which feature music both in Japanese and occasionally, English, playing songs that often have a rock and roll sound to them. In 2007, Rolling Stone Japan ranked his album Someday number 11 on a list of the greatest Japanese rock albums of all time.

Additionally, he has spent a year in New York City, even doing a radio show there.

Sano took part in a special two-day concert commemorating Takashi Matsumoto's 45th anniversary as a lyricist held at the Tokyo International Forum on August 21–22, 2015. He performed lead vocals on "Haikara Hakuchi" with the surviving members of Happy End, Matsumoto, Haruomi Hosono and Shigeru Suzuki, in place of the deceased Eiichi Ohtaki.

== Discography ==
=== Albums ===
- Back to the Street (1980)
- HeartBeat (1981)
- Someday (1982)
- No Damage (1983)
- Visitors (1984)
- Cafe Bohemia (1986)
- Heartland (1988)
- NapoleonFish Day (1989)
- Time Out! (1990)
- Slow Songs (1991)
- Sweet16 (1992)
- No Damage2 (1992)
- The Circle (1993)
- The Golden Ring (1994)
- Fruits (1996)
- The Barn (1997)
- Stones and Eggs (1999)
- The 20th Anniversary Edition (2000)
- Club Mix Collection (2000)
- Grass (2000)
- Spoken Words Collected Poems 1985–2000 (2000)
- In Motion 2001 (2002)
- Someday Collector's Edition (2002)
- The Legend Early Days of Motoharu Sano (2003)
- Visitors 20th Anniversary Edition (2004)
- In Motion 2003 (2004)
- The Sun (2004)
  - The Sun Studio Edition (2005)
  - The Sun Live at NHK Hall (2005)
- The Singles (2006)
- The Essential Cafe Bohemia (2006)
- Coyote (2007)
- Beatitude (2007)
- NapoleonFish Day Special Edition (2008)
- Very Best of Motoharu Sano (2010)
- SideWalk Talk (2011)
- Zooey (2013)
- Tokyo Chic (2014)
- Visitors Deluxe Edition (2014)
- Blood Moon (2015)
- Maniju (2017)
