= A Long Vacation =

Studio album by Eiichi Ohtaki
- Released: March 21, 1981
- Studios: CBS/Sony Roppongi & Shinanomachi
- Genres: Pop; rock; city pop
- Length: 39:59
- Label: Niagara / CBS/Sony
- Producer: Eiichi Ohtaki

Eiichi Ohtaki chronology
Let's Ondo Again (1978)	A Long Vacation (1981)	Niagara Triangle Vol. 2 (1982)

Singles from A Long Vacation
- 1. "Kimi wa Tennen Shoku" Released: March 21, 1981; 2. "Koisuru Karen" Released: June 21, 1981; 3. "Farewell Trans-Siberian Railway" Released: October 21, 1981; 4. "Ame no Wednesday" Released: May 21, 1982

A Long Vacation is an album by Japanese musician Eiichi Ohtaki, released on March 21, 1981. It sold over a million copies and won Best Album at the 23rd Japan Record Awards. It has been called one of the greatest Japanese rock albums of all time, including by Rolling Stone Japan.

== Background ==
Several songs on A Long Vacation were influenced by American record producer Phil Spector and his Wall of Sound formula. But the closing track, "Farewell Trans-Siberian Railway", was intended as a tribute to English record producer Joe Meek.

All three of Ohtaki's former Happy End bandmates contributed to A Long Vacation; Takashi Matsumoto wrote the lyrics for every song except one, Shigeru Suzuki contributed guitar, and Haruomi Hosono played bass guitar.

Although having never been to the Canary Islands, Matsumoto wrote "Canary Islands Nite" based on how he imagined it to be and on the assumption that it was like Hawaii. When he finally did visit in 1999 for a Carlos Kleiber performance, he found it very different.

"Farewell Trans-Siberian Railway" was first released as a single by Hiromi Ōta in November 1980.

"Fun x 4" features backing vocals by Hiromi Ōta, Rats & Star and Hiroaki Igarashi. The end of the song includes the line "Fun, fun, fun now that daddy took the t-bird away" from the Beach Boys' 1964 song "Fun, Fun, Fun".

The album is also known by the nickname Ronbake (ロンバケ), an abbreviation of its title in Japanese.

== Cover artwork ==
The album cover illustration was created by artist Hiroshi Nagai. Nagai said Ohtaki approached him to collaborate on a picture book, also titled A Long Vacation, which was published in 1979. He also claimed that the musician was inspired by his pieces when writing the songs that became the album. After the album's release, Nagai's life was never the same and he was flooded with requests for similar work. The artist provided the cover for several other albums by Ohtaki.

== Release history ==
A Long Vacation was released on vinyl and cassette on March 21, 1981. Four months later, the album Sing Along Vacation was released on July 21, 1981 limited to 10,000 copies. It is an instrumental version of A Long Vacation, excluding "Farewell Trans-Siberian Railway".

On October 1, 1982, A Long Vacation became one of the first albums to be issued on CD. The CD version was certified double platinum by the RIAJ. A remastered version was released on March 21, 1991, marking its tenth anniversary. Ten years later, a 20th anniversary edition was released that includes the instrumental material from Sing Along Vacation. A two-disc 30th anniversary edition was released on March 21, 2011 with the instrumental material plus the single and "Original Basic Track" versions of "Kimi wa Tennen Shoku".

== Legacy ==
A Long Vacation reached number two on the Weekly Oricon Album Chart and was the eighth best-selling album of the 1980s in Japan. The 20th anniversary edition reached number 13 and the 30th anniversary edition peaked at 19. Following Ohtaki's death in December 2013, the 30th anniversary edition jumped to number 25 and the 1991 edition to number 26 in January 2014.

In 2007, it was named the 7th greatest Japanese rock album of all time by Rolling Stone Japan. In its September 2010 special issue, Record Collectors' Magazine named it first on their list of the Best 100 Japanese Rock Albums of the 1980s. Ian Martin of The Japan Times referred to A Long Vacation as a masterpiece and one of the best Japanese albums of all time. "With sounds ranging from Brian Wilson-style harmonies to modern synths, it’s very much a producer’s album." He cited innovative moments such as "chirpy synth effects" on "Fun x 4" as the song switches styles and the male and female vocals on "Velvet Motel" finishing each-others lines.

Every song on the album was covered by different female singers for a 2009 album called A Long Vacation From Ladies, including Amii Ozaki, Miki Imai and Ayano Tsuji.

A wind arrangement of "Kimi wa Tennen Shoku" was used in episode six of the 2016 anime series Sound! Euphonium 2. The original recording was used as the ending theme of the 2020 anime adaptation of Kakushigoto: My Dad's Secret Ambition. "Kimi wa Tennen Shoku" was covered by Takaya Kawasaki for the 2021 Takashi Matsumoto tribute album Take Me to Kazemachi!.

To celebrate the 40th anniversary of A Long Vacation, Record Collectors' Magazine published a retrospective series titled Along A Long Vacation that is written by music critic Manabu Yuasa, who previously worked as an assistant at Ohtaki's office/studio. A new installment was included in each monthly issue from May 2020 until March 2021.

== Track listing ==
All lyrics written by Takashi Matsumoto, except track 4, written by Eiichi Ohtaki, all music composed by Eiichi Ohtaki.

Side A
No.	Title	Length
1.	"Kimi wa Tennen Shoku" (君は天然色)	5:02
2.	"Velvet Motel"	3:42
3.	"Canary Islands Nite" (Kanaria Shotō Nite (カナリア諸島にて))	3:58
4.	"Pap-Pi-Doo-Bi-Doo-Ba Story" (Pap-Pi-Doo-Bi-Doo-Ba Monogatari (Pap-Pi-Doo-Bi-Doo-Ba物語（ストーリー）))	3:14
5.	"Waga Kokoro no Pinball" (我が心のピンボール)	4:24

Side B
No.	Title	Length
6.	"Ame no Wednesday" (雨のウェンズデイ)	4:24
7.	"Speech Balloon" (Supīchi Barūn (スピーチ・バルーン))	3:55
8.	"Koisuru Karen" (恋するカレン)	3:21
9.	"Fun x 4" (FUN×4)	3:26
10.	"Farewell Trans-Siberian Railway" (Saraba Shiberia Tetsudō (さらばシベリア鉄道))	4:33

== Personnel ==
- Guitar - Hiromi Yasuda, Takuji Mihata, Toshiaki Usui, Toru Fukuyama, Eiji Kawamura, Makoto Matsushita, Mikihiko Matsumiya, Chuei Yoshikawa, Hirofumi Tokutake, Kunio Muramatsu, Shigeru Suzuki
- L. Perc - Eiji Narushima, Yoshiyuki Kato, Tatsuji Yokoyama, Masato Kawase, Taro Fussafussa, Larry Sunaga, Noboru Takasugi, Shigemitsu Katayama, Masami Kawahara, Kimura Kimuchi
- Keyboards - Hidetoshi Yamada, Naoko Yamanaka, Koji Suzuki, Akira Inoue, Elton Nagata, Yasuharu Nakanishi, Fumitaka Anzai, Kazufumi Ohama, Gako Ikawa, Yumin Teishu
- Bass - Shogo Kindaichi, Michio Nagaoka, Haruomi Hosono, Kimio Koizumi, Yasuo Arakawa
- Drums - Hiroshi Uehara, Tatsuo Hayashi
- Chorus - Singers Three, Oshamanbe Cats, Kayoko Ishu, Rajie
- Flute - Jake H. Concepcion
- Trumpet - Koji Yoshioka
- Marimba, timpany - Isao Kanayama
- Strings - Norio Maeda, Masataka Matsutoya

== Chart positions ==
=== Weekly charts ===
Year	Album	Catalog number	Country	Chart	Position (peak position)	Weeks (number of appearances)	Sales
1981	A Long Vacation	27AH 1234	Japan	Oricon Weekly LP Albums Chart	2	84	615,000
1981	A Long Vacation	27KH 959	Japan	Oricon Weekly CT Albums Chart	3	100	394,000
1991	A Long Vacation [Remastered reissue]	CSCL 1661	Japan	Oricon Weekly Albums Chart	56	32	83,000
2001	A Long Vacation ～20th Anniversary Edition～	SRCL 5000	Japan	Oricon Weekly Albums Chart	13	37	93,000
2011	A Long Vacation ～30th Anniversary Edition～	SRCL 8000~1	Japan	Oricon Weekly Albums Chart	19	67	—
2021	A Long Vacation ～40th Anniversary Edition～	SRJL 1234	Japan	Oricon Weekly Albums Chart	5	57	—

=== Year-end charts ===
Year	Album	Country	Chart	Position	Sales
1981	A Long Vacation	Japan	Oricon Yearly Albums Chart	2	709,000
1982	A Long Vacation	Japan	Oricon Yearly Albums Chart	26	279,000

== See also ==
- 1981 in Japanese music
