= List of Japanese rock music groups =

The following is a list of notable Japanese rock bands and artists. For an extended list of J-Pop artists, see List of J-pop artists.

== 0-9 ==
- The 5.6.7.8's
- 9mm Parabellum Bullet
- 10-FEET
- 12012

== A ==
- Abingdon Boys School
- Acid Android
- Acid Black Cherry
- Aldious
- Alexandros
- Amazarashi
- A9
- An Cafe
- Androp
- Animetal
- Anthem
- Apryl Fool
- Aqua Timez
- Asian Kung-Fu Generation
- Ayabie

== B ==
- B'z
- Baad
- Babymetal
- Back-On
- The Back Horn
- Back Number
- Band-Maid
- Base Ball Bear
- The Bawdies
- Beat Crusaders
- The Blue Hearts
- Bomb Factory
- Boom Boom Satellites
- Boøwy
- Boris
- Bow Wow
- Brats
- Bridear
- Brian the Sun
- The Brilliant Green
- Buck-Tick
- Bump of Chicken
- Burnout Syndromes

== C ==
- Cali Gari
- Chatmonchy
- Church of Misery
- Cinema Staff
- Coldrain
- Crystal Lake
- The Collectors
- Cö Shu Nie
- Cocobat
- Crossfaith
- Cyntia
- Czecho No Republic
- The Cabs

== D ==
- Dimlim
- D
- D'espairsRay
- Diaura
- Dir En Grey
- DISH//
- Do As Infinity
- Does
- Doll$Boxx
- Dragon Ash

== E ==
- Earthshaker
- Elephant Kashimashi
- Ellegarden
- Exist Trace
- Ezo

== F ==
- Fate Gear
- Flow
- Flower Flower
- Flower Travellin' Band
- Flumpool
- Frederic
- Fear, and Loathing in Las Vegas
- For Tracy Hyde

== G ==
- Gacharic Spin
- Gackt
- Galileo Galilei
- Galneryus
- Garnidelia
- Gastunk
- The Gazette
- Gesu no Kiwami Otome
- Girugamesh
- Glay
- Globe
- Godiego
- Going Under Ground
- Golden Bomber
- The Golden Cups
- Granrodeo
- Guitar Wolf

== H ==
- Hagane
- Hanabie.
- Happy End
- Hello Sleepwalkers
- Hi-Standard
- The Hiatus
- High and Mighty Color
- Hitsujibungaku
- The High-Lows
- HY

== I ==
- I Don't Like Mondays.
- Ikimono-gakari
- Indigo la End

== J ==
- JAM Project
- Janne Da Arc
- Jealkb
- Judy and Mary
- Jupiter

== K ==
- kizu
- Kuroyume
- Kagerou
- Kagrra,
- Kana-Boon
- Keytalk
- King Gnu
- Kyuso Nekokami

== L ==
- L'Arc-en-Ciel
- Lazy
- Ling Tosite Sigure
- LM.C
- Loudness
- Lovebites
- Lovendor
- Lucious
- Luna Sea

== M ==
- Malice Mizer
- Man with a Mission
- Mary's Blood
- Matenrou Opera
- Maximum the Hormone
- Mejibray
- Mongol800
- Monkey Majik
- Monoral
- Moonriders
- The Mops
- Mr. Children
- Mrs. Green Apple
- Mucc
- My First Story
- Morfonica

== N ==
- NaNa
- Nemophila
- Nico Touches the Walls
- Nightmare
- Ningen Isu
- No Regret Life
- Nothing's Carved in Stone
- Novelbright
- Number Girl

== O ==
- Oblivion Dust
- Off Course
- Official Hige Dandism
- Okamoto's
- Oldcodex
- One Ok Rock
- Onmyo-Za
- The Oral Cigarettes
- Orange Range
- Outrage (band)

== P ==
- P'unk-en-Ciel
- Passepied
- The Pees
- The Peggies
- The Pillows
- Pelican Fanclub
- Penguin Research
- Plastic Tree
- Polkadot Stingray
- Polysics
- Poppin'Party
- Porno Graffitti
- Princess Princess

== Q ==
- Queen Bee
- Quruli

== R ==
- Radwimps
- Roselia
- Raise A Suilen

== S ==
- Sabbat
- Sakanaction
- Sambomaster
- Scandal
- Seikima-II
- Sekai no Owari
- Sex Machineguns
- Shonen Knife
- Show-Ya
- Sid
- Sigh
- Silent Siren
- SiM
- The Sixth Lie
- Skin
- Southern All Stars
- The Spiders
- Spitz
- Spyair
- Stereopony
- Straightener
- Super Beaver
- Suchmos
- Sug
- Sumika
- Supercar
- Superfly
- Survive Said The Prophet

== T ==
- The Tempters
- The Tigers
- Toe (band)
- Tokio
- Tokyo Jihen
- Triceratops
- Tube (band)

== U ==
- Undead Corporation
- Unicorn
- Unison Square Garden
- Unsraw
- Uroboros
- Uverworld

== V ==
- Vamps

== W ==
- Wagakki Band
- Wands
- Wanima
- Wino

== X ==
- X Japan

== Y ==
- The Yellow Monkey

== Z ==
- ZARD
- Zazen Boys
- Zone
- Zutomayo
- Zoobombs

== See also ==
- List of visual kei musical groups
- List of musical artists from Japan
