= Bannai Tarao =

Bannai Tarao (多羅尾伴内, Tarao Bannai) is the name of a set of Japanese mysteries (the first, Seven Faces (七つの顔), being made in 1946), featuring a detective of the same name who could take on seven different faces, in turn used as an inspiration to the protagonists of later series 7-Color Mask, Rainbowman, and Cutie Honey. In the film series, Bannai was played by Chiezō Kataoka. He portrayed the character in eleven movies from 1946 until 1960, first for Daiei, then as a contract actor for Toei. After him, Akira Kobayashi portrayed the character in two other movies in 1978. Bannai Tarao was also used as a pseudonym for Japanese musician Eiichi Ohtaki, who is credited on several songs on Japanese rock pioneers Happy End's 1971 album Kazemachi Roman.
