= Chu Kosaka =

Japanese Musical Artist

Chu Kosaka 小坂 忠
- Born: Masayuki Kosaka (小坂 正行); July 8, 1948
- Origin: Nerima, Tokyo, Japan
- Died: April 29, 2022 (aged 73)
- Genres: Folk Rock, Rock, R&B, Gospel, City Pop
- Occupations: Singer-songwriter, composer, gospel singer, pastor
- Instruments: Vocals, guitar
- Years active: 1966–2022
- Labels: Alfa Records/Mashroom, Michtam Records
- Website: https://chu-kosaka.com/

Chu Kosaka, Chew Kosaka (小坂 忠), born Masayuki Kosaka (小坂 正行) on July 8, 1948 – April 29, 2022) was a Japanese singer-songwriter, gospel musician, and pastor. He was known for his foundational contributions to the development of Japanese rock and City pop in the 1970s and later as a pioneer responsible for "laying the foundations" of Japanese gospel music.

== Biography ==
Chu Kosaka was born in Nerima-ku, Tokyo, Japan and raised in Shiki, Saitama Prefecture. He began his music career in 1966 with the band The Floral, which debuted in 1968 under Nippon Columbia. After lineup changes, Kosaka and other members formed the psychedelic rock group Apryl Fool, releasing a self-titled album in 1969.

Kosaka declined to join a subsequent project that evolved into the legendary band Happy End, instead performing in the Japanese production of the musical Hair. In 1971, he released his solo debut album, ありがとう (Arigatō – "Thank You")., described by music blog Raven Sings the Blues as exemplifying the 1970s Japanese rock movement "rooted in a folk and country influence pulled from the West." He later formed Chu Kosaka & Four Joe Half, and composed music for television programs including NHK's Okaasan to Issho.

His 1975 album HORO, featuring members of Tin Pan Alley, is regarded as a seminal city pop record, described by Tower Records Japan's review site Mikiki as "a masterpiece that remains in the history of Japanese pop music."

Following his daughter's recovery from a severe burn injury, Kosaka converted to Christianity in 1976.

In 1978, he founded Michtam Records, Japan's first gospel label. Kosaka was later ordained as a pastor at Akitsu Gospel Church and led worship gatherings and gospel outreach events, including the Jericho Japan series.

In the 2000s, he resumed musical collaborations, releasing the album People in 2001 with production by Haruomi Hosono. In June 2020, he released the song "Mada Yume no Tochū" (まだ夢の途中) with Shigeru Suzuki under the name Shige-Chu (茂 忠).

Kosaka died on April 29, 2022, at the age of 73. Memorial services emphasized the depth of his faith and musical contributions.

== Discography ==
- Arigatō (ありがとう, 1971)
- Hazukashisouni (はずかしそうに,1973)
- HORO (ほうろう, 1975)
- Chew Kosaka Sings (1976)
- Morning (1977)
- People (2001)
- Connected (2009)
- HORO2010 (2010) Re-recorded by 1975 album HORO
- Chu Kosaka Covers (2016) Cover Album
- THE LAST SESSION～with CHU’s Friends (2023)

=== Gospel Albums by Mictham Records ===
- MESSAGE (1991)
- peace^{3} (1997)
- Wasuremono-Ha-Arimasen-ne (忘れものはありませんね, 2000)
- KI-MI-HA-SU-BA-RA-SHI-I (き・み・は・す・ば・ら・し・い, 2004)
- Miracle (ミラクル, 2005)
- Nobody Knows (2013)
