= Hiroshi Nagai =

Japanese artist (born 1947)

- 永井博
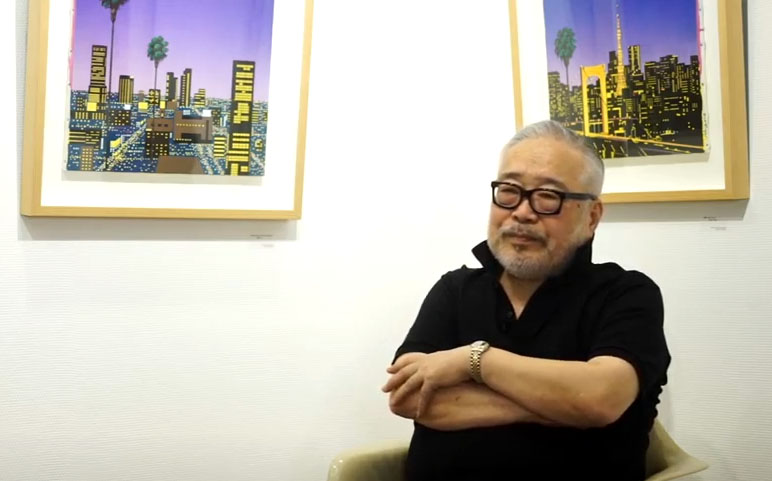
- Nagai in 2020 with two cityscape paintings
- Born: December 22, 1947 (age 78); Tokushima Prefecture, Japan
- Known for: Illustration, graphic design
- Notable work: A Long Vacation (album cover), Niagara Song Book
- Movement: City pop, Vaporwave, Pop art
- Website: hiroshinagai.com

Hiroshi Nagai (Japanese: 永井博, born December 22, 1947) is a Japanese graphic designer and illustrator, known for his cover designs of city pop albums in the 1980s, which established the recognizable visual aesthetic associated with the loosely defined music genre.

== Life and work ==
Nagai was born on December 22, 1947, in Tokushima Prefecture, Japan. He was inspired to become an artist by his father, who enjoyed oil-painted landscapes, and began working as a graphic designer in 1970. Later, Nagai traveled to Tokyo, where he attempted to join art school although he was not accepted. After visiting the United States and Guam between 1973 and 1975, he was impressed by the scenery, which became the starting point of his subsequent style. Gaining an interest in pop art, he took inspiration from English artist David Hockney. Americana became a key component in his art.

Starting in the 1980s, he created tropical and clear landscape illustrations as typified by the record jackets of Eiichi Otaki's A Long Vacation and Niagara Song Book.

Nagai's work had an influence on the vaporwave style and gained wider recognition in the early 2020s, partially thanks to the YouTube era. In 2022, BroadwayWorld described him as a "legendary artist".

== Publications ==
- A Long Vacation [ロングバケーション] (in Japanese). CBS Sony Publishing. 1979.
- Halation [ハレーション] (in Japanese). CBS Sony Publishing. 1981.
- Niagara Songbook [ナイアガラ・ソングブック] (in Japanese). Shogakukan. 1982.
- In a Garden [イン・ア・ガーデン]. Tokyo: Windchime Studio. 1985. OCLC 81409569.
- Time Goes By: Hiroshi Nagai Works Collection [タイム・ゴーズ・バイ : 永井博作品集] (in Japanese) (Reissued by fukkan.com, 2017 ed.). Bunkasha. 2008.
- Cruisin': Hiroshi Nagai Art Collection [クルージング : 永井博作品集] (in Japanese). fukkan.com. 2021. ISBN 978-4-8354-5810-6.
- Human Nature: Hiroshi Nagai Art Collection [ヒューマン・ネイチャー : 永井博作品集] (in Japanese). fukkan.com. 2021. ISBN 978-4-8354-5811-3.
- Tropical Modern: Hiroshi Nagai Art Collection [トロピカル・モダン : 永井博作品集] (in Japanese). fukkan.com. 2022. ISBN 978-4-8354-5875-5.
- Pools: Hiroshi Nagai Art Collection [POOLS: 永井博作品集] (in Japanese). fukkan.com. 2021. ISBN 978-4-8354-5809-0.
- The Journey Begins [ザ・ジャーニー・ビギンズ] (in Japanese). Tokyo: fukkan.com. 2023. ISBN 978-4-8354-5884-7.
