= Happy Ending =

Happy Ending or Happy Endings may refer to:

- Happy ending, a type of plot conclusion

== Film and television ==
- "Happy Ending" (Schitt's Creek), the 2020 series finale of Schitt's Creek
- Happy Ending (2014 film), an Indian Hindi-language film
- Happy Ending (2024 film), an Indian Telugu-language film
- Happy Endings (TV series), a 2011–2013 American sitcom
- Happy Ending (TV series), a 2012 South Korean television series
- Happy Endings?, a 2009 documentary
- Winter Passing, a 2005 American film released in the UK in 2013 as Happy Endings
- Happy Endings (film), a 2005 American film starring Lisa Kudrow
- Happy Endings (1983 film), a film directed by Noel Black
- The Happy Ending, a 1969 drama starring Jean Simmons
- The Happy Ending (1931 film), starring George Barraud
- The Happy Ending (1925 film), starring Fay Compton
- Happy Endings, the working title for British television programme Inside No. 9

== Literature ==
- Happy Endings (novel), a 1996 Doctor Who novel by Paul Cornell
- "Happy Ending" (short story), a 1948 science-fiction story by Henry Kuttner
- "Happy Endings" (short story), a short story by Margaret Atwood
- Happy Ending, a 1957 short story and 1990 anthology by Fredric Brown
- Happy Endings: Tales of a Meaty-Breasted Zilch, a 2007 book by Jim Norton

== Music ==
=== Albums ===
- Happy Ending (Dogstar album), 2000
- Happy Ending (The Phoenix Foundation album), 2007
- Happy Ending (EP), 2016 extended play by South Korean girl group DIA
- Happy Endings (album), a 2017 album by Old Dominion
- Happy Ending, a 1972 album by Terry Riley
- Happy Endings, a 1975 album by Betty Everett
- Happy Endings, a 1981 album by Peter Skellern
- ¿HAPPY ENDING?, a 2023 extended play by Tobias Rahim

=== Songs ===
- "Happy Ending" (Hopsin song), 2017
- "Happy Ending" (Joe Jackson song), 1984
- "Happy Ending" (Mika song), 2007
- "Happy Ending" (Seventeen song), 2019
- "Happy Ending", by Ayumi Hamasaki from My Story, 2004
- "Happy Ending", by Bailey Spinn, 2023
- "Happy Ending", by Demi Lovato from Holy Fvck, 2022
- "Happy Endings", by Doris Day from My Heart, 2011
- "Happy Endings", by Pulp from His 'n' Hers, 1994
- "Happy Endings", by The All-American Rejects from the 2003 album The All-American Rejects
- "Happy Endings", by the Beach Boys from the film The Telephone, 1988
- "Happy Ending", by the cast of The Pirate Movie, 1982

== Other uses ==
- Happy Endings (Jackie Martling album), a 2008 comedy recording
- Happy ending (massage), orgasm as part of erotic massage

== See also ==
- Happy Anding, an upcoming South Korean television series
- Happy End (disambiguation)
- My Happy Ending (disambiguation)
- Happy ending problem
- Happy Endings Productions, an Irish entertainment television production company
