= 23rd Japan Record Awards =

1981 Japanese music awards ceremony

- Date: 31 December 1981
- Location: Imperial Theatre, Tokyo, Japan
- Hosted by: Keizō Takahashi

Highlights
- Most awards: Akira Terao (3)
- Website: http://www.tbs.co.jp/recordaward/

Television/radio coverage
- Network: Tokyo Broadcasting System Television

The 23rd Japan Record Awards ceremony was held on 31 December 1981 at the Imperial Theatre, Tokyo, and was broadcast live in Japan through the TBS Television network. The broadcast ran from 19:00 (JST) to 20:54 (JST). Keizō Takahashi hosted the ceremony for the thirteenth time.

The 23rd Japan Record Award went to Akira Terao for "Ruby no Yubiwa". "Ruby no Yubiwa" also won the Gold Award as well as the Lyricist, Composer, and Arranger Awards. Best Vocal Performance went to Hiromi Iwasaki for "Sumire Iro no Namida", and Best New Artist went to Masahiko Kondō for "Gin Gira Gin ni Sarigenaku".

The audience rating was 35.3%.

== Presenters ==
Main host

- Keizō Takahashi

Progress hosts

- Kentaro Watanabe (TBS announcer)
- Keiko Takeshita

== Nominees and winners ==
=== Japan Record Award ===
- "Ruby no Yubiwa"
  - Artist: Akira Terao
  - Lyricist: Takashi Matsumoto
  - Composer: Akira Terao
  - Arranger: Akira Inoue

=== Best Vocal Performance ===
- Hiromi Iwasaki – "Sumire Iro no Namida"

=== Best New Artist ===
- Masahiko Kondō – "Gin Gira Gin ni Sarigenaku"

=== New Artist Award ===
Best New Artist Award nominations.

- Masahiko Kondō – "Gin Gira Gin ni Sarigenaku"
- Takayuki Takemoto – "Terete Zin Zin"
- Yūko to Yayoi – "Otōsan"
- Yutaka Yamakawa – "Hakodate Honsen"
- Hiroyuki Okita – "Hamidashi Champion"

=== Gold Award ===
Japan Record Award nominations.

- Miyuki Kawanaka – "Anata Hitosuji"
- Shinichi Mori – "Inochi Ataete"
- Masako Mori – "Kanashimi Honsen Nihonkai"
- Hiroshi Itsuki – "Jinsei Kakurenbo"
- Kenji Sawada – "Stripper"
- Hiromi Iwasaki – "Sumire Iro no Namida"
- Hideki Saijo – "Sentimental Girl"
- Chanels – "Machikado Twilight"
- Toshiyuki Nishida – "Moshimo Piano ga Hajiketa nara"
- Akira Terao – "Ruby no Yubiwa"

=== Golden Idol Award ===
- Seiko Matsuda – "Kaze Tachinu"
- Tahara Toshihiko – "Good Luck Love"
- Naoko Kawai – "Smile For Me"
- Yoshie Kashiwabara – "Hello Goodbye"

=== Best Album Award ===
- Off Course – We Are
- Yumi Matsutoya – Mizu no Naka no Asia e
- Eiichi Ohtaki – A Long Vacation

=== Best Ten Albums ===
- Off Course – We Are
- Tatsuro Yamashita – On the Street Corner 1
- Yasuko Agawa – Sunglow
- Southern All Stars – Stereo Taiyō-zoku
- Yumi Matsutoya – Mizu no Naka no Asia e
- The Venus – Love Portion No.1
- Miyuki Nakajima – Ringetsu
- Eiichi Ohtaki – A Long Vacation
- Creation – Lonely Heart

=== Lyricist Award ===
- Takashi Matsumoto – "Ruby no Yubiwa" (singer: Akira Terao)

=== Composer Award ===
Also known as the Shinpei Nakayama Award.

- Akira Terao – "Ruby no Yubiwa" (singer: Akira Terao)

=== Arranger Award ===
- Akira Inoue – "Ruby no Yubiwa" (singer: Akira Terao)

=== Special Award ===
- Utako Matsushima

=== Planning Award ===
- Masayoshi Takanaka, Kitty Films, Polydor Records – Niji Densetsu
- King Records – Uta wa Ikiteiru
- Saori Yuki, Toshiba EMI – Shōwa Tsuyasho

=== Long Seller Award ===
- Yujiro Ishihara – "Brandy Glass"
- George Yamamoto – "Michi no Kuhitori Tabi"
- Tetsuya Ryu – "Okuhida Bojō"

== See also ==
- 1981 in Japanese music
