= My Happy Ending =

My Happy Ending may refer to:

- "My Happy Ending" (song), a 2004 song by Avril Lavigne
- My Happy Ending (film), a 2023 film starring Andie MacDowell
- My Happy Ending (TV series), a South Korean television series
- My Happy Ending (Grey's Anatomy), an episode of the TV series Grey's Anatomy

== See also ==
- Happy ending (disambiguation)
