= 1970s in Japan =

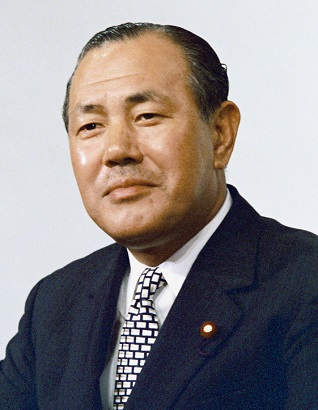
Kakuei Tanaka was inaugurated as Prime Minister on July 7, 1972.

In Japan during the 1970s, the economy was hit by the oil shock and the Nixon shock. Energy consumption dropped and industrial production increased. During the 1970s energy crisis, Japan introduced energy-saving measures and became a hub of miniaturization. The women's liberation movement in Japan, known as ũman ribu, began to gain momentum with feminist groups starting to form in 1970.

In November 1973, a tissue shortage in Japan was reported by news agencies.

== Culture ==
=== Music ===
During the 1970s, Japan had the second largest music market in the world. 1970s Japanese music included kayōkyoku, idols, new music, rock and enka. Musical artists in the 1970s included, in particular, Momoe Yamaguchi, Saori Minami, the Candies, Pink Lady, Hiromi Go, Hideki Saijo, Yuming, Saki Kubota, Judy Ongg and Sachiko Kobayashi. The Best Ten began in 1978.

== See also ==
- Don Maloney (author)
