= Happy End (1970 album) =

1970 studio album by Happy End

Studio album by Happy End
- Released: August 5, 1970
- Recorded: April 9 – 12, 1970
- Studio: Aoi Studios
- Genre: Folk rock
- Length: 35:54
- Label: URC Records
- Producer: Masaki Hata

Happy End chronology
Happy End (1970)	Kazemachi Roman (1971)

Singles from Happy End
- 1. "Juuni Gatsu no Ame no hi" Released: April 1, 1971

Happy End (Japanese: はっぴいえんど, Hepburn: Happī Endo) is the self-titled debut album by Japanese folk rock band Happy End. Because their third album is also self-titled, although written in English, this first album is also known by the name Yudemen (ゆでめん) after the sign depicted in the cover art.

== Background and recording ==
When their band Apryl Fool broke up in October 1969, Haruomi Hosono, Takashi Matsumoto and vocalist Chu Kosaka had planned to form another band together, but Kosaka joined a production of Hair, so Eiichi Ohtaki, who had played with Hosono in a folk act reminiscent of The Kingston Trio, was recruited in his stead. In December, Shigeru Suzuki, who already had a reputation as a skilled guitarist in the band Skye, was invited to join after Hosono and Matsumoto heard him improvise over what would become "Juuni Gatsu no Ame no hi". After Hosono bumped into Eiji Ogura, director of URC (Underground Record Club), Japan's first independent record label, he offered the band a recording contract.

Recording began at Aoi Studios on March 18, 1970. However, due to the band's nervousness and difficulties working with the original recording engineer Tamotsu Yoshida, sessions were temporarily halted. After a rehearsal period, recording resumed with Shūjiro Yotsuie and Yuichi Shima as engineers. Happy End was recorded between April 9 and 12, 1970. It was released on August 5, 1970, with a jacket designed by Seiichi Hayashi and Nobuhiko Yabuki.

Five bonus tracks were added to the album when it was included in the March 31, 2004, Happy End Box set.

== Lyrics ==
All the album's lyrics were written by Takashi Matsumoto, with the exception of "Tobenai Sora" (Hosono) and "Ira Ira" (Ohtaki). Matsumoto's lyrics to the song "Happy End" inspired the name of the band.

"Juuni Gatsu no Ame no hi" was the first song the band wrote. In December 1969, Matsumoto went to visit Ohtaki, who was staying at Blues Creation vocalist Fumio Nunoya's apartment in Wakabayashi, Setagaya. Staring at puddles while waiting for a taxi in the pouring rain, he was inspired by the reflections of the people walking by and the city lights. Matsumoto wrote the lyrics as soon as he arrived and asked Ohtaki to compose music to them. The song was originally titled "Ame Agari" (雨あがり; 'After the Rain') and had slightly different lyrics, but it was slowly updated, and was given its final title just before recording of the album began.

Matsumoto penned the lyrics to "Haruyo Koi" on the same night as "Juuni Gatsu no Ame no hi". Having only just met Ohtaki, he did not know what to talk about other than music. But when he saw Shinji Nagashima's manga The Harsh Story of a Manga Artist in Ohtaki's room, they were able to bond over Garo artists such as Nagashima and Yoshiharu Tsuge. With Ohtaki sleeping, Matsumoto wrote "Haruyo Koi" reconstructing the worldview of those manga artists in rock music and left them on the kotatsu with a note asking him to compose music to them. Michael K. Bourdaghs wrote that "Haruyo Koi" is about "ordinary daily life in the city. Specifically, they take up the boredom of one who faces the New Year holiday alone, sitting by himself at his kotatsu after having abandoned his rural family home for a new life in the city."

In 2023, Matsumoto cited "Kataki—Thanatos o Sōkiseyo!" and "Shin Shin Shin" as songs that he had felt did not work out at the time, but now really likes 50 years later. He remarked that the latter song might have an even deeper meaning now than when he wrote it, due to the Fukushima nuclear accident.

== Reception ==
This album marked an important turning point in Japanese music history, as it sparked what would be known as the "Japanese-language rock controversy" (日本語ロック論争, Nihongo Rokku Ronsō). In 1971, it won New Music Magazine's second annual Japanese Rock Award. This led to highly publicized debates held between prominent figures in the Japanese rock industry, most notably the members of Happy End and Yuya Uchida, regarding whether rock music sung entirely in Japanese was sustainable. Previously, almost all popular rock music in Japan was sung in English. The success of Happy End's debut album, as well as their following album Kazemachi Roman, proved the sustainability of Japanese-language rock in Japan.

Julian Cope, English musician and author of Japrocksampler, referred to 1970's Happy End as clearly the band's best work. Featuring psychedelic-tinged instrumentation, Kenichi Aono of Mikiki cited it as their most "rock-oriented" album. He described the lyrics as ranging from intensely emotional to highly conceptual, and found them to clearly evoke the atmosphere of the late 1960s, while also showing early signs of the scenic imagery that they would come to be known for. Both Cope and HMV Japan noted similarities to the work of Crosby, Stills, Nash & Young. Tal Rosenberg of Pitchfork wrote that the album feels like the band was "trying to replicate Buffalo Springfield instead of taking inspiration from them. Some songs, like 'Kakurenbo' and 'Juuni Gatsu no Ame no ni', sound exactly like late-'60s Stephen Stills and Neil Young sung in Japanese."

== Legacy ==
The song "Shin Shin Shin" inspired the 2013 film of the same name.

The album cover was featured in the first episode of the 2017 anime Tsuki ga Kirei.

In 2021, photographer Mike Nogami released the photobook Yudemen containing pictures he took of Happy End during the recording of the album and an interview with Shigeru Suzuki.

The song "Juuni Gatsu no Ame no hi" appears diegetically in the Japan-only PlayStation 2 game Boku no Natsuyasumi 2, set in August 1975 in a fictional coastal town in southern Japan. In the game, Yoshika, a mysterious college girl, performs a solo acoustic rendition of the song around a campfire on one of the final days of the game's story while reminiscing on the events of the preceding month.

== Track listing ==
All lyrics are written by Takashi Matsumoto, except "Tobenai Sora", by Haruomi Hosono, and "Ira Ira", by Eiichi Ohtaki.

Side 1
No.	Title	Music	Length
1.	"Haruyo Koi" (春よ来い, 'Come, Spring!')	Ohtaki	4:17
2.	"Kakurenbo" (かくれんぼ, 'Hide-and-seek')	Ohtaki	4:32
3.	"Shin Shin Shin" (しんしんしん, 'Newly-fallen Snow')	Hosono	3:06
4.	"Tobenai Sora" (飛べない空, 'Unflyable Sky')	Hosono	2:44
5.	"Kataki—Thanatos o Sōkiseyo!" (敵タナトスを想起せよ!, 'Remember Your Enemy—Thanatos!')	Hosono	3:00

Side 2
No.	Title	Music	Length
6.	"Ayakashi no Dōbutsuen" (あやか市の動物園, 'Ayaka City Zoo')	Hosono	2:48
7.	"Juuni Gatsu no Ame no hi" (12月の雨の日, 'A Rainy Day in December')	Ohtaki	3:27
8.	"Ira Ira" (いらいら, 'Nervousness')	Ohtaki	3:15
9.	"Asa" (朝, 'Morning')	Ohtaki	2:29
10.	"Happy End" (はっぴいえんど)	Hosono	3:26
11.	"Zoku Happppy Eeeend" (続はっぴ-いいえ-んど, 'Continued Happppy Eeeeend')	Hosono	2:20

2004 Bonus tracks
No.	Title	Length
12.	"Juuni Gatsu no Ame no hi (Unreleased Version)" (十二月の雨の日 （未発表ヴァージョン）)	3:41
13.	"Juuni Gatsu no Ame no hi (Single Version)" (十二月の雨の日 （シングル・ヴァージョン）)	3:19
14.	"Ira Ira (Long Fade-out Edit)" (いらいら （ロング・フェイド・アウト・エディット）)	3:32
15.	"Asa (Take 3)" (朝 （テイク3）)	2:32
16.	"Tegami ("Kaze wo Atsumete" Rehearsal Take)" (手紙 （「風をあつめて」リハーサル・テイク）)	2:16

== Personnel ==
- Haruomi Hosono – vocals, bass, keyboards, guitar
- Eiichi Ohtaki – vocals, guitar, 12-string guitar
- Shigeru Suzuki – lead guitar, celesta
- Takashi Matsumoto – drums, percussion
- Eiji Ogura – 12-string guitar, hand clapping

== See also ==
- 1970 in Japanese music
