= Takashi Matsumoto (lyricist) =

Japanese lyricist and former musician (born 1949)

- Also known as: Rei Matsumoto (松本零)
- Born: July 16, 1949 (age 76); Aoyama, Tokyo, Japan
- Genres: Pop, rock, folk rock
- Occupations: Lyricist, record producer, musician
- Instrument: Drums
- Years active: 1968–present
- Formerly of: Happy End, Apryl Fool

Takashi Matsumoto (Japanese: 松本 隆, Hepburn: Matsumoto Takashi; born July 16, 1949) is a Japanese lyricist and former musician. After several years playing the drums in the rock bands Apryl Fool and Happy End during the late 1960s and early 1970s, Matsumoto decided to focus on writing lyrics for others in 1974. As of 2015, he had written over 2,100 songs, 130 of which entered the top 10 on the Oricon chart. Total sales of the singles he has written exceed 49.8 million copies, making him the third best-selling lyricist in Japan. In 2017, he was awarded the Medal with Purple Ribbon from the Japanese government for his work in music.

== Life and career ==
Takashi Matsumoto was born in Aoyama, Tokyo, but raised in Azabu. In elementary school, he listened to Igor Stravinsky and read poetry by Jean Cocteau. However, he bought a drum kit and became obsessed with rock music because of the Beatles. Matsumoto is a Keio University graduate.

Matsumoto's first band was Burns (バーンズ, Bānzu) in college, which covered songs like Them's "Gloria and Sam & Dave's "Hold On, I'm Comin'". When their bassist left, Matsumoto recruited Haruomi Hosono into Burns in the spring of 1968. In early 1969, Matsumoto, using the alias Rei Matsumoto, joined Hosono in a band called The Floral. On April 1, they changed their name to Apryl Fool, and four days later, began recording their first and only album. It features "Kurai Nichiyōbi", which Matsumoto and Hosono wrote during their time in Burns. However, the relationships between band members deteriorated between the album's recording and its September release date, and so Apryl Fool announced their break up on the release day of their only album.

Hosono, Matsumoto and vocalist Chu Kosaka had planned to form another band together, but Kosaka joined a production of Hair, so Eiichi Ohtaki, who had played with Hosono in a folk act reminiscent of The Kingston Trio, was recruited in his stead. The new band was dubbed Valentine Blue, and had their first concert on October 28, 1969. In December, Shigeru Suzuki, who already had a reputation as a skilled guitarist in his band Skye, was invited to join after Hosono and Matsumoto heard him improvise over what would become their first original song, "Juuni Gatsu no Ame no hi". In April 1970, Hosono decided to change the band's name. He chose Happy End based on Matsumoto's lyrics to the song of the same name. After releasing two studio albums, Happy End (1970) and Kazemachi Roman (1971), they officially disbanded on New Year's Eve 1972, before the 1973 release of their third album. They are considered to be among the most influential artists in Japanese music, with Mikiki crediting them with laying the foundation for Japanese rock.

Upon declaring himself a lyricist, Matsumoto told a friend that he wanted to write a "commercial" song, meaning a TV advertisement. But the friend mistakenly thought by "commercial" he meant "popular" and got him a job writing for Agnes Chan, a pop idol. Matsumoto made his debut as a lyricist in 1974 with "Pocket Ippai no Himitsu" by Chan. Matsumoto said that while in Happy End he focused on the quality of the music over its potential popularity, but upon becoming a lyricist, he vowed to focus on both quality and sales.

He was most prolific in the late 1970s and 1980s, offering lyrics to many idol singers such Seiko Matsuda (including 17 of her 24 consecutive No. 1 singles), Kyōko Koizumi, Miho Nakayama, Masahiko Kondo and Hiroko Yakushimaru as well as musical artists such as Yellow Magic Orchestra. The songs "Garasu no Shounen", "Hakka Candy" and "Boku no Senaka ni wa Hane ga Aru" by KinKi Kids are some of his notable recent work.

Matsumoto took part in two winning works at 1981's 23rd Japan Record Awards. Akira Terao's hit song "Ruby no Yubiwa" won the Grand Prix award. Matsumoto wrote nine of the ten songs on his Happy End bandmate Eiichi Ohtaki's record A Long Vacation, which won Best Album. Matsuda's album Supreme, which Matsumoto produced, won Best Album at 1986's 28th Japan Record Awards.

In 2002, he formed the independent record label Kazemachi Records (風待レコード, Kazemachi Rekōdo).

In 2015, the tribute album Kazemachi de Aimashō (風街であひませう) was created to commemorate Matsumoto's 45th anniversary as a lyricist. The album won a Planning Award at the 57th Japan Record Awards. A special two-day concert for the same anniversary was held at the Tokyo International Forum on August 21–22, 2015 featuring numerous artists such as Hiromi Ōta, Shinji Harada, Shoko Nakagawa, Yū Hayami, Junichi Inagaki, Akiko Yano. Matsumoto himself stepped behind the drum kit once again to perform songs with the surviving members of Happy End; Hosono and Shigeru Suzuki.

Another tribute album, titled Matsumoto Takashi 50th Anniversary Tribute Album: Take Me to Kazemachi! (松本 隆 作詞活動50周年トリビュートアルバム『風街に連れてって！』) and overseen by Seiji Kameda, was released on July 14, 2021. It features artists such as B'z, Glim Spanky, Daichi Miura, Daoko, and members of Little Glee Monster. At the 63rd Japan Record Awards in 2021, Matsumoto received a Special Award.

== Honors ==
- Japan Lyricist Awards, for "Fuyu no Riviera" by Shinichi Mori (1983)
- Medal with Purple Ribbon (2017)
