= Kazemachi Roman =

1971 studio album by Happy End

Studio album by Happy End
- Released: November 20, 1971
- Recorded: May 11 – September 12, 1971
- Studio: Mouri Studio
- Genre: Folk rock
- Length: 37:14
- Label: URC Records
- Producer: Happy End

Happy End chronology
Happy End (1970)	Kazemachi Roman (1971)	Happy End (1973)

Singles from Kazemachi Roman
- 1. "Hana Ichi Monme" Released: December 10, 1971

Kazemachi Roman (Japanese: 風街ろまん, Hepburn: Kazemachi Roman; lit. 'Wind City Romance') is the second album by Japanese folk rock band Happy End, released on URC Records in 1971. In this concept album, Happy End attempted to paint a musical picture of Tokyo before the 1964 Summer Olympics, through which sweeping changes transformed the city forever.

== Background and release ==
Takashi Matsumoto's lyrics to "Kaze wo Atsumete" were inspired by a line from a poem by Fuyue Anzai that he saw scribbled in the bathroom of Max Road, a Shibuya café that he frequented. OK Music's Naoto Kawasaki notes how Eiichi Ohtaki and Shigeru Suzuki did not contribute to the track, with Haruomi Hosono playing the bass, guitar and organ and providing its vocals while Matsumoto plays the drums. Suzuki is also absent from "Kurayamizaka Musasabi Henge", which Kawasaki felt was inspired by the Nitty Gritty Dirt Band.

Bannai Tarao, a fictional detective who has appeared in many Japanese crime thrillers, is credited on several of the album's songs. Ohtaki even opens "Haikara Hakuchi" by saying, in English, "Hi, this is Bannai Tarao. Haikara (lit. "High-collar " or "Western fashion") is... Beautiful." The title of the song is written in hiragana as はいからはくち, a double meaning: "Haikara Hakuchi" (ハイカラ白痴; lit. 'Haikara Idiot') and "Hai Kara Haku Chi" (肺から吐く血; lit. 'Blood Spitting from the Lungs'). In addition, "hakuchi"/"haku chi" is also a pun on "hakushi" (博士; 'doctor'), making it "Dr. Haikara". This song was the B-side to Happy End's single "Juuni Gatsu no Ame no hi" off their first album, though this album version is different.

Matsumoto thought "Hana Ichi Monme" was a representative song of Happy End, and it was released as a single. Its B-side was "Natsu Nandesu", which Ben Sisario of The New York Times described in 2017 as having "echoes of Neil Young."

The lyrics to "Ashita Tenki ni Naare" are about the Vietnam War. When Matsumoto was in Apryl Fool, they would play discothèques in Shinjuku where a lot of American hippies who had returned from Vietnam hung out. "They were drinking and dancing happily to our music, but their hearts must have been shattered. [...] I think those feelings are reflected in the lyrics. We are the generation born after [World War II], so although our parents experienced it, we did not. But the Vietnam War is something that remains with us."

Kawasaki believes the ending of "Haru Ranman", with its uncredited banjo, mimics the end of Buffalo Springfield's 1967 song "Bluebird".

"Aiueo", the album's last song, is a 30-second fragment in which Ohtaki sings the gojūon, accompanied only by his acoustic guitar. The song's title is a pun: "aiueo" is the order of pronunciation in Japanese, while ai ue (愛飢え) translates as "love hunger".

Matsumoto had been planning to title the album "Kazetoshi" (風都市; lit. 'Wind City'), but a talent agency to manage Happy End and Hachimitsu Pie was formed under the name first, angering Matsumoto.

Seven bonus tracks were added when the album was included in the March 31, 2004 Happy End Box set.

== Artwork ==
The front cover of Kazemachi Roman features portraits of the four members of Happy End drawn by manga artist Kazuhiko Miyaya, whom Matsumoto was a fan of. They were drawn based on photographs taken by Mike Nogami. The album's inside gatefold features a trolley scene, also drawn by Miyaya. Because the trolley's destination sign reads "Shinbashi", for years fans assumed that the illustration depicted the No. 6 streetcar, which ran between Shinbashi and Shibuya, near the Kasumi-cho intersection (now the Nishi-Azabu intersection), before the line was discontinued in 1967. In actuality, while looking through photos Miyaya took as reference, Matsumoto was struck by an image of a trolley going down an S-curved hill on the Toden Arakawa Line in the Ōji area of Kita. Although Matsumoto had a vague connection to the area through his aunt, the other members of the band did not, so he requested Miyaya draw the trolley as if it were traveling from Shibuya, where Happy End was based, to Shinbashi. Miyaya included actual buildings from Kasumi-cho, as well as a utility pole advertisement for a local obstetrics and gynecology clinic. The back cover features a photograph of the four members, with a fifth portrait of their manager Shinzo Ishiura seemingly attached to it via a clip.

== Reception and legacy ==
Professional ratings
Review scores
Source	Rating
AllMusic	3.5/5 stars
Pitchfork	8.8/10

Together with their self-titled debut album, Happy End's Kazemachi Roman marked an important turning point in Japanese music history, as it sparked what would be known as the "Japanese-language rock controversy" (日本語ロック論争, Nihongo Rokku Ronsō). There were highly publicized debates held between prominent figures in the Japanese rock industry, most notably the members of Happy End and Yuya Uchida, regarding whether rock music sung entirely in Japanese was sustainable. Previously, almost all popular rock music in Japan was sung in English. The success of Happy End's first two albums proved the sustainability of Japanese-language rock..

AllMusic's Jesse Jarnow described "Sorairo no Crayon" and "Kaze wo Atsumete" as "decent country rockers" that could stand with any contemporary "west coast psych-twang LP" and "Hana Ichi Monme" as one of the album's "slick and sleek organ-driven pop tunes". He noted the album also includes a "hint" of guitar jamming on tracks such as the six-minute "Taifū". Yo La Tengo bassist James McNew included Kazemachi Roman on a 2023 list of his nine favorite albums. Calling it "California folk-rock filtered through Tokyo, streamlined and, well, perfected", he also noted the sweet melancholic and nostalgic songs with their "aching, vulnerable harmonies." Kenichi Aono of Mikiki described Matsumoto's lyrics for the album as being based on the drummer's memories of the Aoyama, Shibuya and Azabu districts, where he spent his childhood, and as evoking vivid imagery of a fictional city named "Kazemachi" in the minds of listeners.

In September 2007, Rolling Stone Japan ranked Kazemachi Roman No.1 on its list of the "100 Greatest Japanese Rock Albums of All Time". It was named number 15 on Bounce's 2009 list of 54 Standard Japanese Rock Albums. In 2016, the album topped the list of 30 Best Japanese Albums of All Time published by beehype magazine.

"Aiueo" was covered by Pizzicato Five as the final track on their last album, 2001's Çà et là du Japon.

Two songs from Kazemachi Roman were used in American films which had Brian Reitzell acting as music supervisor. In 2003, "Kaze wo Atsumete" was featured in Lost in Translation as well as on its soundtrack. In 2008, "Haikara Hakuchi" was featured in The Brothers Bloom.

British band Yuck covered "Natsu Nandesu" for the Japanese edition of their 2011 self-titled album.

"Sorairo no Crayon" was covered by thrash metal band Outrage for their 2015 album Genesis I.

"Hana Ichi Monme" was covered by Rolly for his 2015 cover album Rolly's Rock Circus.

"Kaze wo Atsumete" was covered by Mayu, Manaka and Asahi from Little Glee Monster for the 2021 Takashi Matsumoto tribute album Take Me to Kazemachi!.

== Track listing ==
All lyrics are written by Takashi Matsumoto, except "Haikara Beautiful", by Bannai Tarao, and "Taifū", by Eiichi Ohtaki.

Side A - Wind (風)
No.	Title	Music	Producer	Length
1.	"Dakishimetai" (抱きしめたい, 'I Want to Hold You')	Ohtaki	Ohtaki	3:32
2.	"Sorairo no Crayon" (空色のくれよん, 'Sky Blue Crayon')	Ohtaki	Ohtaki	4:05
3.	"Kaze wo Atsumete" (風をあつめて, 'Gather the Wind')	Haruomi Hosono	Hosono	4:06
4.	"Kurayamizaka Musasabi Henge" (暗闇坂むささび変化, 'Ghosts of Flying Squirrels at Kurayamizaka')	Hosono	Hosono	1:51
5.	"Haikara Hakuchi" (はいからはくち, 'Westernized Idiot' or 'Blood Spitting from the Lungs')	Ohtaki	Ohtaki	3:37
6.	"Haikara Beautiful" (はいからびゅーちふる, 'Westernized, Beautiful')	Tarao	Tarao	0:33

Side B - City (街)
No.	Title	Music	Producer	Length
7.	"Natsu Nandesu" (夏なんです, ''Tis the Summer')	Hosono	Hosono	3:16
8.	"Hana Ichi Monme" (花いちもんめ,'Hana Ichi Monme')	Shigeru Suzuki	Suzuki, Tatsuo Hayashi	3:59
9.	"Ashita Tenki ni Naare" (あしたてんきになあれ, 'We Hope that Tomorrow is Clear')	Hosono	Hosono, Suzuki	2:13
10.	"Taifū" (颱風, 'Typhoon')	Ohtaki	Tarao	6:30
11.	"Haru Ranman" (春らんまん, 'Spring, in Full Bloom')	Ohtaki	Ohtaki	2:49
12.	"Aiueo" (愛餓を, 'Love-Hunger' or 'ABC')	Ohtaki	Tarao	0:37

2004 Bonus tracks
No.	Title	Length
13.	"Haikara Hakuchi Introduction~Narration (Take Erushii)" (はいからはくち お囃子〜ナレーション（テイクちぇるしい）)	0:46
14.	"Haikara Hakuchi Narration (Takes 1 & 2)" (はいからはくち ナレーション（テイク1・2）)	0:22
15.	"Haikara Hakuchi (City Version)" (はいからはくち （『CITY』ヴァージョン）)	2:36
16.	"Haikara Hakuchi (Single Version)" (はいからはくち （シングル・ヴァージョン）)	2:27
17.	"Ashita Tenki ni Naare (Rehearsal Take & Rhythm Tracks)" (あしたてんきになあれ （リハーサル・テイク/リズム・トラックス）)	2:24
18.	"Natsu Nandesu (Rehearsal Take)" (夏なんです （リハーサル・テイク）)	3:18
19.	"Aiueo" (あいうえお)	0:35

== Personnel ==
- Haruomi Hosono – bass on tracks 1–5 and 7–11, piano on tracks 1, 2, 8 and 9, organ on tracks 1, 3, 7 and 8, vocals on tracks 3, 4, 7 and 9, acoustic guitar on tracks 3, 4, 7 and 11, claves on track 5, cowbell on track 6, chorus on tracks 5, 7 and 11, flat mandolin on track 4 as "Mondo Uno" (宇野主人)
- Eiichi Ohtaki – acoustic guitar on tracks 1, 2, 11 and 12, vocals on tracks 1, 2, 5 and 10–12, electric guitar on track 5, slide guitar on track 6, güiro on track 5, chimes on track 5, chorus on tracks 1, 2, 4, 5, 8, 9 and 11
- Shigeru Suzuki – electric guitar on tracks 1, 5 and 7–11, acoustic guitar on track 11, vocals on track 8, cowbell on track 5, chorus on tracks 1 and 5, slide guitar on track 6 as "Kozo Hoshiimo" (ほしいも小僧)
- Takashi Matsumoto – drums on all tracks except 6 and 12, taiko on track 6, congas on track 5, cowbell on track 5, chorus on track 1
- Shiba – mouth harp on tracks 10 and 11
- Komazawa – steel guitar on track 2

== See also ==
- 1971 in Japanese music
