= Apryl Fool =

Japanese rock band (formed and disbanded 1969)

- Origin: Tokyo, Japan
- Genres: Psychedelic rock; art rock; progressive rock
- Years active: 1969
- Label: Musicolor Records / Nippon Columbia
- Past members: Chu Kosaka; Eiji Kikuchi; Hiro Yanagida; Haruomi Hosono; Rei Matsumoto

Apryl Fool (エイプリル・フール) were a Japanese rock band formed in 1969. They released one album in September 1969 and disbanded a month later. Two members of Apryl Fool went on to form folk rock band Happy End.

== Outline ==
The predecessor of Apryl Fool were Floral, a band created by the Japanese Monkees Fan Club in February 1968. Floral debuted on Nippon Columbia in August 1968 during the Group Sounds craze. Floral split due to artistic differences and Apryl Fool was formed on April 1, 1969, with a new bassist (Haruomi Hosono) and a new drummer (Rei Matsumoto). The name Apryl Fool was derived from the date of the band's formation and from the idea that "with this name, we can do things quite freely without being elaborated upon or irresponsibly".

Around the time of the change of members, core member Hiroyoshi Yanagida became interested in organ rock groups like Iron Butterfly, Vanilla Fudge, and The Doors, which were representative of art rock/psychedelic rock in the US and UK. Unlike the blues rock (guitar-oriented) that was popular in Japan in 1969 (The Golden Cups, Blues Creation, The Mops, etc.), Apryl Fool's sound was considered radical at the time. They were one of the pioneering bands in the Japanese "new rock" movement, which advocated Anglo-American rock.

The Apryl Fool released their debut, and only, album The Apryl Fool on September 27, 1969. In a retrospective review Sean Westergaard of AllMusic described the album as "a great mixture of hard psych and blues-rock". The album includes a cover of the song "Pledging My Time" by Bob Dylan. Only two of the tracks are sung in Japanese ("Suite: Mother Earth" and "Dark Sunday"), as the band believed that "only English could be used to understand the reaction in other countries." Pitchfork described the Japanese tracks on Apryl Fool as "suffused with lysergic vibrations."

Apryl Fool played their final show in Ginza on October 26, 1969, and broke up. The next day, Hosono and Matsumoto formed Happy End under the name Blue Valentine. In March 2019 Hosono released Hochono House, a remade version of his debut solo album, to coincide with the 50th anniversary of his first release with Apryl Fool.

== Members ==
- Chu Kosaka – vocals
- Eiji Kikuchi – guitar
- Hiro Yanagida – keyboard
- Haruomi Hosono – bass guitar
- Rei Matsumoto – drums

== Discography ==
=== Studio albums ===
- Apryl Fool (September 27, 1969) – Columbia LP: YS-10068-J

=== Extended plays ===
- Love & Banana with Tokyo Kid Brothers (ラブ&バナナ, late 1969) – Musicolor LP: unnumbered

=== The Floral ===
A predecessor band of The April Fools, which debuted from a company specializing in picture disc manufacturing. Kosaka, Kikuchi, and Yanagida joined the band.

- Namida Wha Hanabira (涙は花びら, August, 1968）- Musicoror / Nippon Colombia EP:MA1

Namida Wha Hanabira（涙は花びら, "Tears are petals")
Suiheisen No Bara（水平線の薔薇, "Roses on the Horizon")

- Samayou Hune (さまよう船, October, 1968）- Musicoror / Nippon Colombia EP:MA2

Samayou Hune (さまよう船 "A wandering ship")
Ai No Memory (愛のメモリー "Memories of Love")

== See also ==
- Happy End
- Music of Japan
- Japanese rock
