= Don Maloney (author) =

American businessman and author (1928–2007)

- Born: Donald J. Maloney; 1928; Yonkers, New York
- Died: September 3, 2007 (aged 78–79)
- Education: Syracuse University
- Occupations: Columnist, businessman, politician
- Spouse: Sarah Maloney
- Children: Frances Mangino; Barbara Sato; Shawn Maloney; Donald Maloney Jr.
- Writing career
- Genre: Humor
- Notable works: Japan: It's Not All Raw Fish; Son of Raw Fish

Donald J. Maloney (1928 Yonkers, New York – September 3, 2007) was an American author. He wrote a weekly newspaper column about his life as an American businessman in Japan during the 1970s.

Maloney graduated from the Syracuse University School of Journalism in 1948. In 1970, Maloney was assigned to Tokyo by the Harris Corporation (then of Cleveland, Ohio) to engineer Harris' entry into the Japanese market. He negotiated a 50/50 joint venture between Harris and Marubeni Corporation of Japan, and served as managing director and chief operating officer of Marubeni-Harris Printing Equipment Company.

He was a member of the Tokyo American Club, American Chamber of Commerce Japan, America-Japan Society, International House, and the Foreign Correspondents' Club of Japan.

Maloney is probably best known in Japan for his humorous newspaper columns published every Sunday in Tokyo's English-language daily, the Japan Times, entitled Never the Twain...? which dealt exclusively with the experience of an American expatriate living in Japan. In 1975, a collection of his articles from 1970 to 1974 were published in Japan: It's Not All Raw Fish, ISBN 4-7890-0028-1, even used as course material by North Carolina State University; followed by Son of Raw Fish. His accounts of life as lived by a foreigner striving in Japan included episodes involving "Wife Sarah," his four kids (Frances, Barbara, Shawn and Donald Jr.), his Japanese neighbors and all the shopkeepers, coworkers, policemen and folks from every walk of life were grist for his knee-slapping editorial mill. The Maloney family lived next to Yomiuri Giants manager and former superstar Shigeo Nagashima, providing Maloney with a virtually bottomless pool of column material.

The book Japan: It's Not All Raw Fish was translated into Japanese and published under the title Gaijin wa tsurai yo (Japanese: 外人はつらいよ).

An example of Maloney's self-deprecating humor-

"All foreigners should total up all the money they are spending each month on Japanese lessons. Drop out of school and send the money to the 'Maloney Final Solution to the Language Problem Fund.' The Fund will use the money to teach English to the Japanese. And since you will have free time, you can hire yourself out to the Fund as an English teacher, earning extra money to boot."

He served five two-year terms as a commissioner for the City of Holmes Beach, Florida, beginning in 1995. After losing a reelection bid in 2005, he returned to humor writing, authoring a twice-monthly column for a local newspaper.

Maloney died September 3, 2007, at the age of 79. He was survived by his wife of 58 years, Sarah, as well as his four children and twelve grandchildren.
