= Group sounds =

Genre of Japanese rock music

- Stylistic origins: Rock and roll; rockabilly; rhythm and blues; beat; psychedelia; kayōkyoku
- Cultural origins: Mid-1960s, Japan
- Derivative forms: J-pop

Group sounds (Japanese: グループ・サウンズ, Hepburn: Gurūpu Saunzu), often abbreviated as GS, is a genre of Japanese rock music which became popular in the mid to late 1960s and initiated the fusion of Japanese kayōkyoku music and Western rock music. Their music production techniques were regarded as playing a pioneering role in modern Japanese popular music.

Group sounds arose following the Beatles performance at the Budokan in 1966, and was strongly influenced by British beat music of the 1960s. Group sounds acts included the Tigers, the Tempters, the Spiders, the Mops, and the Golden Cups. The movement peaked in late 1967 when Jackey Yoshikawa and His Blue Comets won the Japan Record Award.

== See also ==
- Music of Japan
- J-pop
- Visual kei
- Japanese hip hop
- Japanese jazz
- Japanese reggae
- Japanese ska
- List of Japanese rock bands
- Enka
- Ryūkōka
