= Shigeru Suzuki =

Japanese musician (born 1951)

Shigeru Suzuki 鈴木茂
- Born: December 20, 1951 (age 74); Setagaya, Tokyo, Japan
- Genres: Rock, folk rock
- Occupations: Guitarist, record producer, musician, songwriter
- Instruments: Guitar, vocals, synthesizer
- Years active: 1965–present
- Formerly of: Happy End
- Website: Official website

Shigeru Suzuki (Japanese: 鈴木 茂, Hepburn: Suzuki Shigeru; born December 20, 1951) is a Japanese musician, songwriter and guitarist. He first became known as a member of the influential rock band Happy End in the early 1970s, before starting a solo career and becoming a prolific session musician. As of 2006, Suzuki had contributed to 588 recordings. In 2019, Suzuki's high school band Skye reunited and released their first album.

== Career ==
Second-year junior high school student Shigeru Suzuki began playing guitar and formed a the Ventures cover band named CIA with some classmates in 1965. In 1968, while still a student at Aoyama Gakuin Senior High School, he formed the band Skye with classmates Tatsuo Hayashi and Ray Ohara (later of the Sadistic Mika Band). In December 1969, Suzuki was invited by Haruomi Hosono and Takashi Matsumoto to join Valentine Blue, which also included Eiichi Ohtaki. The quartet changed their name to Happy End and went on to be credited as the first rock act to sing in Japanese. They released three albums, Happy End (1970), Kazemachi Roman (1971) and Happy End (1973), before officially disbanding on New Year's Eve 1972. In the band, Suzuki was predominantly a guitarist, but would sing his own compositions, such as "Hana Ichi Monme".

Suzuki and Hosono then formed Caramel Mama (キャラメル・ママ) with Hayashi, Masataka Matsutoya and Hiroshi Sato in 1973. They changed their name to Tin Pan Alley (ティン・パン・アレー) a year later and worked as session musicians, most notably for Matsutoya's future wife, Yumi Arai. Suzuki said the idea was to form a collective like the Muscle Shoals Rhythm Section, but things did not go as planned.

Suzuki released his first solo album Band Wagon in 1975. It was recorded in Los Angeles with musicians from notable acts such as Little Feat, Santana and Sly and the Family Stone. To tour the record, he formed the band Huckleback (ハックルバック; sometimes written as "Hucklebuck") with Sato, bassist Akihiro Tanaka and drummer Toshiaki Hayashi. The group played around 10 shows, before disbanding on November 16, 1975. The following year, tracks the band recorded for audio engineer Shinichi Tanaka to play at an audio trade fair, were released as the album Maboroshi no Huckleback. Suzuki's next solo album, 1976's Lagoon, was recorded in Hawaii and saw him venture into Hawaiian music and bossa nova. Writing for Mikiki, Kenichi Makimura described 1978's Caution! as seeing Suzuki shift to pop music.

Suzuki, Hosono and Hayashi reformed Tin Pan Alley, dropping the "Alley" from the name, for an album in 2000.

On February 17, 2009, Suzuki was arrested by the Tokyo Wangan Police Station for violating the Cannabis Control Law. He received a six month prison sentence suspended for three years on March 17.

To celebrate his 40th anniversary as a solo artist, Suzuki teamed up with Ino Hidefumi for two concerts on April 3 and 4, 2015. They performed twice each day and were backed by Hayashi and Hama Okamoto.

Suzuki supported Yumi Matsutoya at the 69th NHK Kōhaku Uta Gassen at the end of 2018. When Ohara invited Suzuki and Tatsuo Hayashi to record with Shiro Sano in 2019, the three decided to reunite their high school band Skye. Adding Matsutoya to the line-up, they released the album Kindan no Kajitsu with Sano on September 25, 2019. In June 2020, he released the song "Mada Yume no Tochū" (まだ夢の途中) with Chu Kosaka under the name Shige-Chu (茂 忠). Skye's self-titled first album was released on October 27, 2021. Album, their second album with Sano, was released on July 5, 2023. Skye's second album, Collage, was released on July 24, 2024.

== Musical style and songwriting ==
Suzuki's initial interest in music came from the Ventures. He has also cited the Beatles, Jimi Hendrix, Buffalo Springfield and Little Feat as influences. Suzuki said that Band Wagon (1975) was created to capture the spirit of the 8-beat, guitar-driven rock bands that he had liked since high school. For Lagoon (1976), he embraced the musical trends of the time and was listening to much jazz-oriented music. With Caution! (1978), he drifted from his "band-centric" mindset and created a straight-up pop record as he wanted to make music without limiting himself to the guitar and to handle the orchestration himself. After taking a hiatus from making records, Suzuki said it was the Police who inspired him to return.

Suzuki frequently collaborated with lyricist Takashi Matsumoto. He said the order of their songwriting process was split roughly fifty-fifty between Suzuki writing the music first and Matsumoto writing the lyrics first. He opined that Matsumoto's lyrical themes were initially drawn from his own inner world and were like a collage, but over time, he began asking Suzuki what kind of lyrical landscape he wanted and the guitarist described the lyricist's later words as cinematic. For example, "Lady Pink Panther" was penned when the two were talking about movies and Suzuki told Matsumoto he had just watched The Pink Panther. Suzuki has said he was never confident in his singing and therefore composed songs to specifically suit his voice and singing style. As a result, he said his compositions often feature unconventional rhythmic phrasing and take on an idiosyncratic form. For example, he would sometimes take the Japanese lyrics and transcribe them into romaji before composing. He did this to prioritize rhythm, "even if it meant the vocal intonation sounded a little unconventional [...] sometimes, creating a slightly peculiar intonation actually makes for a more interesting result."

== Equipment ==
Suzuki is best known for playing Fender Stratocasters. His most famous is a 1962 model that he acquired in 1973 simply because he liked its Fiesta Red color. He shaved the neck to make it more comfortable to grip. As of 2025, he rarely plays it live, instead using it for creating demos at home. During his days in Happy End, Suzuki used a Stratocaster equipped with a P-90 pickup. He has also used an ELK Jaguar and a Gibson Firebird.

In 2020, Fender released Suzuki's signature model guitar, the "Shigeru Suzuki '62 Stratocaster Journeyman Relic". It meticulously reproduces his 1962 model, replicating everything from its paint, materials, electronics and shaved neck, to the wear and scratches.

== Discography ==
Solo studio albums

- Band Wagon (1975)
- Maboroshi no Huckleback (幻のハックルバック; 1976, credited to "Shigeru Suzuki and Huckleback")
- Lagoon (1976)
- Caution! (1978)
- Telescope (1978)
- Cosmos '51 (1979)
- White Heat (1979)
- Sei Do Ya (1985)
- Kujira no Umi ~ Living Whales (クジラの海～Living Whales; 1998)

With Tin Pan Alley

- Caramel Mama (キャラメル・ママ; 1975)
- Tin Pan Alley 2 (1977)
- Märchen Pop (メルヘン・ポップ; 1979, cover album)
- Tin Pan (2000)

With Skye

- Kindan no Kajitsu (禁断の果実; 2019, credited to "Shiro Sano meets Skye with Masataka Matsutoya")
- Skye (2021)
- Album (2023, credited to "Shiro Sano meets Skye")
- Collage (2024)

CBS/Sony Sound Image Series

- Pacific (1978) with Haruomi Hosono and Tatsuro Yamashita
- New York (1978) with various artists
- Island Music (1983) with Hosono, Yamashita, Matsutoya, Ryuichi Sakamoto and Takahiko Ishikawa
- Off Shore (1983) with Hosono, Yamashita, Sakamoto, Matsutoya, Masaki Matsubara and Kazumasa Akiyama
