= Happy Ending (Hopsin song) =

Single by Hopsin

from the album No Shame
- Released: October 13, 2017
- Genre: Hip hop; dirty rap; comedy hip hop
- Length: 4:38
- Label: Undercover Prodigy; 300 Entertainment
- Songwriter: Marcus Hopson
- Producer: Hopsin

Hopsin singles chronology
"The Purge" (2017)	"Happy Ending" (2017)	"Witch Doctor" (2017)

Music video
- "Happy Ending" on YouTube

"Happy Ending" is a song by American rapper Hopsin. It was released on October 13, 2017, along with an accompanying music video as the second single from his fifth studio album No Shame. The video was originally taken down from YouTube due to featuring (partially censored) nudity. The song and video, which chronicle Hopsin's experience paying for sexual services at an Asian massage parlor, received nearly universally negative reviews from music critics and drew backlash for its racist and sexist depiction of Asian women.

== Background ==
"Happy Ending" is a hip hop song that tells the story of Hopsin visiting an Asian massage parlor. The song features the stereotypical Oriental riff in the instrumentation. In the chorus, Hopsin sings in a mock Asian accent with broken English as he portrays an Asian woman working in a massage parlor, offering "sucky-sucky", a reference to the Da Nang prostitute in the 1987 Stanley Kubrick film Full Metal Jacket.

Hopsin raps about his original intentions of finding a prostitute on Backpage, only to change his mind after seeing an advertisement for an Asian massage parlor. In graphic detail, Hopsin describes how the masseuse massages his "buttcrack" and "nutsack" before she offers him a combination of a handjob, oral sex and penetrative sex for $125. After an hour, he ejaculates on her breasts. In the outro, Hopsin confirms his return to the massage parlor, "because when the times get rough, a happy ending is necessary."

In an interview with XXL, Hopsin explained that the song was inspired by his real-life experiences paying for 'happy endings' at massage parlors, a habit that started at age 19. "I also wanted to be the first rapper to come out and openly admit that," he said.

== Music video ==
A music video for "Happy Ending" was released on October 13, 2017. In the video, Hopsin is having a discussion in a restaurant about a "happy ending" as he explains to his friends what the colloquial usage of the term means, telling them his story about the Asian massage parlor. The scene then shifts to an Asian massage parlor, where Hopsin waits in the lobby before being taken into the back room for a massage.

Midway through, the masseuse strips naked and offers sex, holding two jars with money labeled "Suckee" and "Fuckee" that cover her breasts. The video portrays a simulated handjob, fellatio and penetrative sex, also humorously censored by props and camera angles, after which Hopsin ejaculates confetti. Hopsin said, "I'm fully naked in the video and it looks halfway like a porno."

The video was removed from YouTube after less than a day as it violated the website's nudity guidelines. Hopsin angrily responded on Twitter claiming that there was no nudity in the video, tweeting "I busted my ass on that happy ending video! I can't believe they removed my shit! Fucked up my whole marketing campaign" and "I ain't see no nipples in that shit. I wore a dick sock." Hopsin initially explained that, "the Asian people, of course a lot of them don't feel too happy about it, but it's my reality; it's something that I've done." He later halted his attempts to put the video back on YouTube, saying "I would never want to piss off a whole race of people and the Asian community isn't really happy about it and that's not the type of attention I want on myself."

== Reception and controversy ==
"Happy Ending" received negative reception from music critics. In a review of No Shame, Pitchfork stated that Hopsin "raps about getting off at a massage parlor in a terrible mock accent, mimicking the masseuse for the hook: 'If you no say nothing, I can give you sucky-sucky.' It would be one thing if the song was just crude or offensive or unlistenable, but it’s a trifecta." Anthony Fantano named "Happy Ending" as the worst single of 2017, and three years later also called it the worst single of the entire decade of the 2010s.

The song and video have been described as portraying "Asian women perpetuating the racist stereotype of being mere trophies of Asian fetishists", oblivious to the fact that "most women who are forced to work as prostitutes in such parlors are actually victims of human trafficking." HotNewHipHop compared the absurdity of the song's lyrics to R. Kelly's "Trapped in the Closet" and described it as the "lyrical equivalent to porn."

Congresswoman Nydia Velázquez condemned the song and video, releasing a statement saying, "This video blatantly plays on racist and sexist stereotypes about Asian women and their sexuality. Not only does this offensive song and video demean Asian people, but it ignores the fact that many women in massage parlors like those depicted in the piece are human trafficking victims. Hopsin is essentially celebrating human trafficking and lampooning those who have been forced into prostitution. I encourage all online music platforms to stop carrying this offensive song and video."
