= Happy End (1973 album) =

1973 studio album by Happy End

Studio album by Happy End
- Released: February 25, 1973
- Recorded: October 13–18, 1972
- Studios: Sunset Sound Studios, Los Angeles, California
- Genre: Folk rock
- Length: 29:41
- Label: Bellwood/King
- Producers: Happy End, Van Dyke Parks

Happy End chronology
Kazemachi Roman (1971)	Happy End (1973)

Singles from Happy End
- 1. "Sayonara America, Sayonara Nippon" Released: February 25, 1973

Happy End is the third and final album by Japanese folk rock band Happy End. (Note: Their first album is also titled Happy End but written in Japanese as はっぴいえんど, see Happy End (1970 album).) It was recorded in Los Angeles, produced by Van Dyke Parks and features several American session musicians such as Lowell George and Bill Payne of the band Little Feat.

== Background and recording ==
The album was recorded at Sunset Sound Studios in Los Angeles in late 1972. Van Dyke Parks, known for his collaborations with Brian Wilson and The Beach Boys, produced the album. In 2013, Parks stated that the band walked in unannounced while he and Lowell George were working on "Sailin' Shoes" and asked him to give them the "California Sound". He initially refused saying he was busy with sessions for his own album Discover America, but accepted when George noticed a suitcase full of new one hundred-dollar bills with Happy End's manager.

Although Haruomi Hosono later described the work with Parks as "productive," the album sessions were tenuous, and the members of Happy End were disenchanted with their vision of America they had anticipated. A language barrier along with opposition between the Los Angeles studio personnel and the band was also apparent, which further frustrated the group. He and Eiichi Ohtaki both recalled that Parks was drunk during production and tried to lecture them about Pearl Harbor and World War II. These feelings were conveyed in the closing track "Sayonara America, Sayonara Nippon" (さよならアメリカ さよならニッポン; "Goodbye America, Goodbye Japan"), which received some contributions from Parks and George. As Takashi Matsumoto explained: "We had already given up on Japan, and with [that song], we were saying bye-bye to America too—we weren't going to belong to any place."

Happy End officially disbanded on December 31, 1972, two months before the album was released on February 25, 1973.

In 1974, Shigeru Suzuki returned to Los Angeles to record his first solo album Band Wagon and once again worked with Bill Payne, Dick Hyde and Kirby Johnson.

The song "Fuuraibo" would be covered by pop singer Chisato Moritaka on her 1998 album, This Summer Will Be More Better, which was produced by Hosono.

== Track listing ==
Side 1
No.	Title	Lyrics	Music	Length
1.	"Fūraibō" (風来坊, 'Wanderer')	Haruomi Hosono	Hosono	3:31
2.	"Hisamezuki no Sukecchi" (氷雨月のスケッチ, 'A Sketch of Ice Storm Month')	Takashi Matsumoto	Shigeru Suzuki	3:05
3.	"Ashita Atari wa Kitto Haru" (明日あたりはきっと春, 'It Will Surely Be Spring Tomorrow')	Matsumoto	Suzuki	4:00
4.	"Mufūjōtai" (無風状態, 'No Wind')	Hosono, "parrot" lyric inspiration by Matsumoto	Hosono	3:18

Side 2
No.	Title	Lyrics	Music	Length
5.	"Sayonara Tōri San-banchi" (さよなら通り３番地, 'Goodbye Street No. 3-banchi')	Matsumoto	Suzuki	3:13
6.	"Aiaigasa" (相合傘, 'Sharing an Umbrella')	Hosono	Hosono	3:05
7.	"Inakamichi" (田舎道, 'Country Road')	Matsumoto	Eiichi Ohtaki	2:39
8.	"Soto wa ii Tenki" (外はいい天気, 'It's Nice Out')	Matsumoto	Ohtaki	2:18
9.	"Sayonara America, Sayonara Nippon" (さよならアメリカ さよならニッポン, 'Goodbye America, Goodbye Japan')	Happy End	Happy End, Van Dyke Parks	4:33

== Personnel ==
Happy End

- Haruomi Hosono – bass guitar, mandolin, acoustic guitar, piano, vocals
- Eiichi Ohtaki – acoustic guitar, vocals
- Shigeru Suzuki – electric guitar, acoustic guitar, vocals
- Takashi Matsumoto – drums, percussion

Session musicians and production staff

- Kirby Johnson – brass arrangements on tracks 1–3
- Van Dyke Parks – organ, piano
- Tom Scott – alto sax, tenor sax
- Bill Payne – piano
- Dave Duke – French horn
- Slyde Hyde – trombone
- Chuck Findley – trumpet
- Lowell George – slide guitar
- Design and layout by Work Shop Mu!!
- Photo by Masahiro Nogami

== See also ==
- 1973 in Japanese music
