= The Mops =

- Origin: Japan
- Genres: Group sounds, psychedelic rock, garage rock
- Years active: 1966–1974
- Labels: JVC, Toshiba

The Mops (Japanese: ザ・モップス) were a Japanese psychedelic rock/garage rock group active in the late 1960s and early 1970s. They were one of the most notable bands of the group sounds genre.

== History ==
The Mops were formed in 1966 by a group of high schoolers: Mikiharu Suzuki (drums), Taro Miyuki (guitar), Masaru Hoshi (or Katu Hoshi) (guitar), and Kaoru Murakami (bass). They began as an instrumental rock group similar to The Ventures, but soon after forming, Mikiharu Suzuki's brother Hiromitsu joined on lead vocals. The group began to play psychedelic rock at the suggestion of their manager, who had brought home recordings of American hippie groups such as Jefferson Airplane from his trip to San Francisco. The group signed to JVC Records, the Japanese wing of Victor Records, and released a single in November 1967 called "Asamade Matenai", which hit No. 38 on the Japanese charts. In April 1968, the full-length debut, Psychedelic Sound in Japan, followed; the album included covers of "White Rabbit" and "Somebody to Love" by Jefferson Airplane, "Light My Fire" by The Doors, as well as "Inside-Looking Out" and "San Franciscan Nights" by The Animals. They received much press for being the "first psychedelic band" in Japan, and performed with elaborate light shows.

Bassist Murakami quit the group in 1969, and guitarist Miyuki moved to bass. The group then signed with Liberty/Toshiba/EMI, moving to a blues rock and hard rock sound, and followed with the hits "Tadorituitara Itumo Amefuri" "Gekko Kamen (Moonlight Mask)" and "Goiken Muyo (No Excuse)", both of which charted in 1971. Several albums followed before the group's breakup in May 1974.

After The Mops, Hoshi remained in the music industry, working as an arranger. Hiromitsu Suzuki became a TV personality and actor, and Mikiharu Suzuki embarked on a successful career in artist management. The group achieved a resurgence of cult fandom in America after their "theme song", entitled "I'm Just A Mops", was included on the 1960s rarities compilation Nuggets II.

== Discography ==
- サイケデリック・サウンド・イン・ジャパン/Psychedelic Sounds in Japan (JVC Records, April 1968)
- ロックンロール'70/Rock & Roll '70 (Liberty Records, June 5, 1970)
- 御意見無用(いいじゃないか) (Liberty, May 5, 1971)
- 雷舞 (Liberty, October 5, 1971)
- 雨/モップス'72/Mops '72 (Liberty)
- モップスと16人の仲間 (Liberty, July 5, 1972)
- モップス1969～1973/Mops 1969~1973 (Liberty, June 5, 1973)
- ラブ・ジェネレーション/モップス・ゴールデン・ディスク/Mops Golden Disk (Liberty, October 25, 1973)
- イグジット/Exit (Liberty, July 5, 1974)
