= Happy End (band) =

Japanese folk rock band

- Happy End in September 1971. From left to right: Eiichi Ohtaki, Haruomi Hosono, Shigeru Suzuki and Takashi Matsumoto.

Background information
- Also known as: Valentine Blue
- Origin: Chiyoda, Tokyo, Japan
- Genres: Folk rock; psychedelic rock
- Years active: 1969–1972 1973, 1985, 2015, 2021 (reunions)
- Labels: URC; Bellwood/King
- Past members: Haruomi Hosono; Takashi Matsumoto; Eiichi Ohtaki; Shigeru Suzuki

Happy End (Japanese: はっぴいえんど, Hepburn: Happī Endo) was a Japanese folk rock band active from 1969 to 1972. Composed of Haruomi Hosono, Takashi Matsumoto, Eiichi Ohtaki and Shigeru Suzuki, the band's pioneering sound was regarded as avant-garde to most Japanese at the time. They are considered to be among the most influential artists in Japanese music, with Mikiki crediting them with laying the foundation for Japanese rock. MTV described Happy End's music as "rock with psych smudges around the edges."

== History ==
=== Career ===
In the spring of 1968, when his band Burns needed a bass player, drummer Takashi Matsumoto reached out to Haruomi Hosono, a Rikkyo University student whom he heard was quite skilled, and they began playing shows together. When vocalist Chu Kosaka, keyboardist Hiro Yanagida and guitarist Eiji Kikuchi, were looking to re-launch their band The Floral, they recruited Hosono and then Matsumoto and formed the psychedelic rock band Apryl Fool in April 1969. Matsumoto described them as being influenced by bands like Vanilla Fudge, "really progressive sounds for the time." When Yanagida started getting more into music like Buffalo Springfield and the West Coast sound that was becoming popular, Matsumoto said Hosono became interested in it too, and "we started shifting toward that style." The relationships between band members deteriorated, and Apryl Fool decided to break up in October 1969 following the September release of their debut album.

Hosono, Matsumoto and Kosaka had initially planned to form another band together, but Kosaka joined the Japanese production of Hair, so Eiichi Ohtaki, who had played with Hosono in a folk act reminiscent of The Kingston Trio, was recruited in his stead. Hosono chose Valentine Blue (ヴァレンタイン・ブルー) as the name of the new band because he would get depressed on Valentine's Day. In December, Shigeru Suzuki, who already had a reputation as a skilled guitarist in the band Skye, was invited to join after Hosono and Matsumoto heard him improvise over what would become "Juuni Gatsu no Ame no hi". In March 1970, Hosono, Matsumoto and Suzuki contributed to Kenji Endo's album Niyago. The group were also the backing band for Nobuyasu Okabayashi, performing on his album Miru Mae ni Tobe. With Okabayashi fixated on Bob Dylan at the time, Eiji Ogura recommended Valentine Blue for the job by describing them as similar to the Band. In April 1970, Hosono decided to change the band's name. He chose Happy End based on Matsumoto's lyrics to the song of the same name. Matsumoto stated that at the time Happy End started, they were influenced by Moby Grape, Buffalo Springfield, and the Grateful Dead.

After Hosono connected with Eiji Ogura, director of URC (Underground Record Club), Japan's first independent record label, URC offered Happy End a recording contract and they began recording their own album in April 1970. Their self-titled debut album (written in Japanese as はっぴいえんど) was released in August. It marked an important turning point in Japanese music history, as it sparked what would be known as the "Japanese-language Rock Controversy" (ja:日本語ロック論争, Nihongo Rokku Ronsō). There were highly publicized debates held between prominent figures in the Japanese rock industry, most notably the members of Happy End and Yuya Uchida, regarding whether rock music sung entirely in Japanese was sustainable. Previously, almost all popular rock music in Japan was sung in English. Around September 1970, Keiichi Suzuki—later the leader of Moonriders and known internationally for his work on the EarthBound soundtrack—provided live support at a couple of concerts. Although he had hoped to join as a full member and the band considered it, Keiichi's joining was ultimately passed over. The success of Happy End's debut album and their second, Kazemachi Roman released a year later, proved the sustainability of Japanese-language rock in Japan.

Suzuki later recalled that, immediately following the recording of Kazemachi Roman, it felt as if the band was heading towards its conclusion. By 1972, Hosono found it difficult to sing while playing bass during live performances and switched to guitar and piano, with Yoshiyuki Noji of Blues Creation supporting Happy End on bass. In July, they completed the Last Happy End Tour (ラスト・はっぴいえんどツアー). However, they received offers to record in America, which they had always dreamed of visiting, and so recorded another album. For their third and final album, also titled Happy End (this time written in the Latin alphabet), they signed with King Records and recorded in late 1972 in Los Angeles, with Van Dyke Parks participating in the production of the closing track. Although Hosono later described working with Parks as "productive", the album sessions were fraught with tension, and the members of Happy End became disenchanted with the idealized vision of America they had anticipated. Cultural and language barriers between the group and the Los Angeles studio personnel also created frustration during recording. These feelings were conveyed in "Sayonara America, Sayonara Nippon", which featured contributions from Parks and Little Feat guitarist Lowell George. As Matsumoto explained: "We had already given up on Japan, and with [that song], we were saying bye-bye to America too—we weren't going to belong to any place." The band officially ceased activities on December 31, 1972, and the album was released in February 1973.

On September 21, 1973, a concert titled City - Last Time Around was held at Bunkyō Kōkaidō. The event was planned to showcase acts related to Happy End, such as Coconut Bank (which was produced by Ohtaki), Moonriders (which was produced by Matsumoto) and Caramel Mama (which included Hosono and Suzuki), before the four former bandmates decided to perform together. Happy End's set, which included Keiichi on keyboards, was released as the live album Live Happy End the following year. Matsumoto later said that, while he was not the one who broke the band up, he did want free from the constraints of the four members' conflicting values and did not want to play drums with any bassist other than Hosono. In 2023, Matsumoto said he did not really know why Happy End broke up; although he had a theory, he stated he could not disclose it, and Suzuki suggested it might be better to leave it a mystery.

=== Post-activities ===
After breaking up, all four members continued to work together and contribute to each other's solo albums and projects. Hosono and Suzuki formed Tin Pan Alley with Masataka Matsutoya and Tatsuo Hayashi, before Hosono started the pioneering electronic music act Yellow Magic Orchestra and Suzuki continued work as a guitarist and solo musician. Matsumoto became one of the most successful lyricists in the country and Ohtaki worked as a songwriter and solo artist, releasing one of Japan's best-selling and most critically acclaimed albums, A Long Vacation in 1981. Happy End reunited for a one-off performance at the International Youth Anniversary All Together Now (国際青年年記念 ALL TOGETHER NOW) concert on June 15, 1985, which was released as the live album The Happy End that September.

An album called Happy End Parade ~Tribute to Happy End~ and composed of covers of their songs by different artists was released in 2002. Hosono was involved in selecting the contributors and in Kicell's cover of "Shin Shin Shin", Matsumoto determined the cover art and title, and Suzuki participated in Yōichi Aoyama's cover of "Hana Ichi Monme". In 2003, their song "Kaze wo Atsumete" appeared in the American movie Lost In Translation and on its soundtrack.

Eiichi Ohtaki died on December 30, 2013, from a dissecting aneurysm at the age of 65. For the 2015 tribute album Kazemachi de Aimashō, commemorating Matsumoto's 45th anniversary as a lyricist, Matsumoto, Hosono and Suzuki recorded the previously unreleased Happy End song "Shūu no Machi" (驟雨の街). A special two-day concert for the same anniversary was held at the Tokyo International Forum on August 21–22, 2015 featuring numerous artists. Matsumoto, Hosono and Suzuki opened each day by performing "Natsu Nandesu" and "Hana Ichi Monme", immediately followed by "Haikara Hakuchi" with Motoharu Sano. They also closed the shows with "Shūu no Machi", and finally "Kaze wo Atsumete" alongside a number of other artists.

The three surviving members of Happy End reunited again on November 5–6, 2021 for a two-day concert, that also featured numerous other artists, at the Nippon Budokan to celebrate Matsumoto's 50th anniversary. Also in 2021, Suzuki's band Skye recorded the unreleased Happy End song "Chigiregumo" (ちぎれ雲) for their self-titled album.

== Legacy ==
Happy End are credited as the first rock act to sing in Japanese. Matsumoto later reflected that, "There were two strings of music back in the day. You had kayōkyoku, old-style Japanese pop music that had already existed, and then group sounds. There were bands tied to that latter movement like The Golden Cups and The Spiders, who were active in the Yokohama scene, which was a really interesting music community because it had a huge American influence owing to the navy base in nearby Yokosuka. Their singles would have an A-side, that was more like kayōkyoku, but the B-side would have something more psychedelic, more genuine rock. That gap between the two sides felt strange to me and the other members of Happy End, so we decided to not worry about whether what we created would sell. We just wanted to do something original. If you make something original, it's probably better to sing it in Japanese." Although, he did note that Hosono had initially felt that they should sing in English; "I think Hosono-san had the intention of wanting to do something that would go beyond just Japan. For me, I wanted to share something that was good about everyday Japanese life. That was the basis of my lyrics. It's something that's interesting to people even beyond Japan, but I actually think it would have needed a really good translator to connect."

According to music critic Ian Martin, Happy End pioneered a style of songwriting that combined Japanese-language lyrics with Western-influenced folk rock in a one-syllable one-note rhythmic form. In 2012, Michael K. Bourdaghs wrote, “For Matsumoto, the Japanese language was above all a source of raw material for use in experimentation. [...] for Happy End, the Japanese language functioned not as a repository of tradition or identity but as an alienated and alienating tongue — a source of noise.” Singer-songwriter Sachiko Kanenobu wrote that "they had a poetic way of writing that was never part of Japanese rock music before".

Happy End's music has been cited as one of the origins of modern "J-pop", with each member continuing to contribute to its development after the group's break up. The band is also considered progenitors of what would become the "City Pop" style. Masataka Miyanaga, Japanese music critic and founder and professor of Beatles University at Kanazawa University, wrote that, given the impact they had, it would not be an exaggeration to call Happy End the "Japanese Beatles". Matsumoto said, "We literally had no promotion, and they stopped selling our albums shortly after they came out — everything afterward was a re-issue. But the important thing about Happy End is that parents show it to their kids. Older workers show it to new co-workers. The older students share it with younger classmates. That's how our music has passed down."

In 2003, Happy End were ranked by HMV at number 4 on their list of the 100 most important Japanese pop acts. Ohtaki and Hosono also appear on the list as solo artists, ranked number 9 and 44 respectively. In September 2007, Rolling Stone Japan named Kazemachi Roman the greatest Japanese rock album of all time. It was also named number 15 on Bounce's 2009 list of 54 Standard Japanese Rock Albums.

== Members ==
- Haruomi Hosono (細野晴臣) – vocals, bass, keyboards, guitar
- Eiichi Ohtaki (大瀧詠一) – vocals, guitar
- Shigeru Suzuki (鈴木茂) – guitar, vocals
- Takashi Matsumoto (松本隆) – drums, lyricist

== Discography ==
=== Studio albums ===
- Happy End (はっぴいえんど, Happī Endo; August 5, 1970)
- Kazemachi Roman (風街ろまん; November 20, 1971)
- Happy End (February 25, 1973)

=== Live albums ===
- Live Happy End (ライブ・はっぴいえんど, Raibu Happī Endo; recorded 9/21/1973, released January 15, 1974)
- The Happy End (recorded 6/15/1985, released September 5, 1985)
- Happy End Greeeatest Live! On Stage (はっぴいえんど GREEEATEST LIVE! ON STAGE; recorded 4/12/70, 8/7/71, 4/14/71, released July 15, 1986)
- Happy End Live On Stage (はっぴいえんど LIVE ON STAGE; recorded 8/9/70, 8/21/71, 4/14/71, 8/7/71, released August 25, 1989)

=== Compilations ===
- City - Happy End Best Album (CITY／はっぴいえんどベスト・アルバム, Shiti/Happī Endo Besuto Arubamu; 1973)
- Singles (シングルス, Shingurusu; 1974)
- Happy End (はっぴいえんど〜HAPPY END; 1993, box set)
- Happy End Box (はっぴいえんどBOX, Happī Endo Box; 2004, box set)
- Happy End Masterpiece (はっぴいえんどマスターピース, Happī Endo Masutāpīsu; 2014, box set)

=== Singles ===
- "Juuni Gatsu no Ame no hi" (12月の雨の日; April 1, 1971)
- "Hana Ichi Monme" (花いちもんめ; December 10, 1971)
- "Sayonara America, Sayonara Nippon" (さよならアメリカさよならニッポン; February 25, 1973)
- "Ashita Tenki ni Naare" (あしたてんきになあれ; November 26, 1999)

== See also ==
- Music of Japan
- Japanese rock
