= Japanese rock =

Rock music from Japan

Japanese rock (Japanese: 日本のロック, Hepburn: Nihon no Rokku), sometimes abbreviated to J-rock (ジェイ・ロック, Jei Rokku), is rock music from Japan. Influenced by American and British rock of the 1960s, the first rock bands in Japan performed what is called group sounds, with lyrics almost exclusively in English. Folk rock band Happy End in the early 1970s are credited as the first to sing rock music in the Japanese language. Punk rock bands Boøwy and The Blue Hearts and hard rock/heavy metal groups X Japan and B'z led Japanese rock in the late 1980s and early 1990s by achieving major mainstream success.

Rock bands such as B'z and Mr. Children are among the best selling music acts in Japan. Rock festivals like the Fuji Rock Festival were introduced in the late 90s with attendances reaching a peak of 200,000 people per festival making it the largest outdoor music event in the country.

== History ==
=== 1960s: Western music adaptation ===
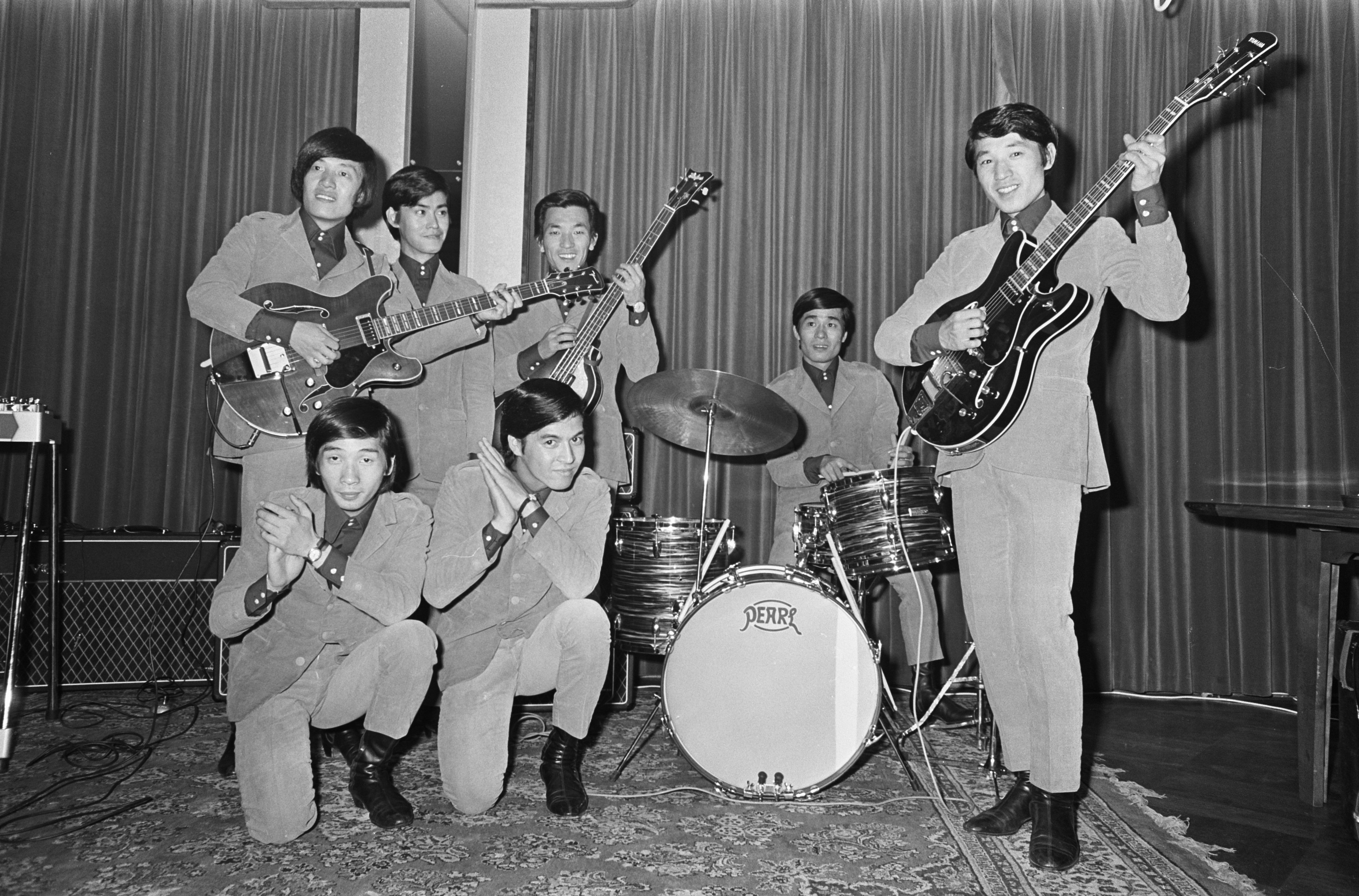
The Spiders in the Netherlands, 1966

Rockabilly had a brief surge in popularity in Japan during the late 1950s. Suppressed by authorities, elements of it nevertheless managed to reach the mainstream through singers such as Kyu Sakamoto.

In the 1960s, many Japanese rock bands were influenced by Western rock musicians such as the Beatles, Bob Dylan, and the Rolling Stones, along with other Appalachian folk music, psychedelic rock, mod and similar genres: a phenomenon that was called Group Sounds (G.S.). John Lennon of the Beatles later became one of the most popular Western musicians in Japan. By the late 1960s, Group Sounds bands such as The Tempters, the Tigers, the Golden Cups, the Ox, the Village Singers, the Carnabeats, the Mops, the Jaguars, the Wild Ones and the Spiders had big hits. After the boom of Group Sounds, there were several folk singer-songwriters. They were influenced by Bob Dylan and American folk music. The Tigers were the most popular Group Sounds band in the era. Later, some of the members of the Tigers, the Tempters, and the Spiders formed the first Japanese supergroup, Pyg.

70s "New Rock" group such as the Power House, the Blues Creation, Murasaki, Condition Green, and Bow Wow released rock albums. After seeing a show by then-upcoming artist Jimi Hendrix during a visit to Europe, Yuya Uchida returned home and formed Yuya Uchida & the Flowers in November 1967 in order to introduce a similar sound to Japan.

=== 1970s to 1980s: Diversification ===
==== Hard rock and heavy metal ====
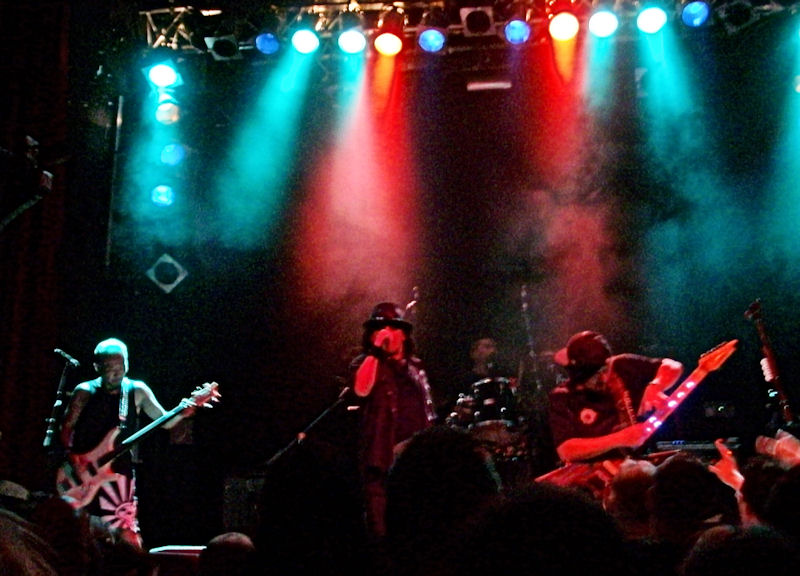
Loudness performing in Hamburg, 2010

Uchida replaced every member of The Flowers except its drummer and renamed them the Flower Travellin' Band for October 1970's Anywhere, which includes covers of heavy metal band Black Sabbath and progressive rock act King Crimson. They moved to Canada and published their first album of original material, Satori which was released in April 1971 and is now considered a progenitor of heavy metal music and, together with Kirikyogen, doom metal. Japanese heavy metal bands started emerging in the late 1970s, pioneered by Bow Wow (1975), 44 Magnum (1977) and Earthshaker (1978). In 1977, Bow Wow supported Aerosmith and Kiss on their Japanese tours. They performed at both the Montreux Jazz Festival in Switzerland and the Reading Festival in England in 1982. After some member changes resulted in a more commercial sound, they changed their name to Vow Wow and relocated to England. Their 1989 album Helter Skelter reached number 75 on the UK Albums Chart.

In the 1980s, a plethora of Japanese heavy metal bands formed. Loudness was formed in 1981 by former Lazy members Akira Takasaki and Munetaka Higuchi. In 1983, they toured the United States and Europe and soon started focusing more on an international career. In a 1985 deal with Atco Records, Loudness became the first Japanese metal act signed to a major label in the United States. Their albums Thunder in the East (1985), Lightning Strikes (1986) and Hurricane Eyes (1987) reached numbers 74, 64 and 190 on the Billboard chart. Loudness replaced singer Minoru Niihara with American vocalist Michael Vescera in 1988, in an unsuccessful attempt to further their international popularity. Loudness were famous among heavy metal fans in the United States. In the '80s, few bands had a female members, like all-female band Show-Ya fronted by Keiko Terada, and Terra Rosa with Kazue Akao on vocals. In September 1989, Show-Ya's album Outerlimits was released, it reached number 3 in the Oricon album chart.

==== Folk rock ====
Happy End is credited as the first rock band to sing in the Japanese language. Their self-titled debut album was released in August 1970 on the experimental record label URC (Underground Record Club). This album marked an important turning point in Japanese music history, as it sparked what would be known as the "Japanese-language Rock Controversy" (日本語ロック論争, Nihongo Rokku Ronsō). There were highly publicized debates held between prominent figures in the rock industry, most notably the members of Happy End and Yuya Uchida, regarding whether Japanese rock music sung entirely in Japanese was sustainable. The success of Happy End's debut album and their second, Kazemachi Roman released in November 1971, proved the sustainability of Japanese-language rock music in Japan.

Carol (led by Eikichi Yazawa), RC Succession and Funny Company were especially famous and helped define the sound. Sometimes also beginning in the late sixties, but mostly active in the seventies, are musicians mixing rock music with American-style folk and pop rock elements. Folk rock musicians such as Tulip, Banban, Garo, Yosui Inoue were popular in the music scene.

==== Techno pop and electronic ====
Several Japanese musicians began experimenting with electronic rock in the early 1970s. The most notable was the internationally renowned Isao Tomita, whose 1972 album Electric Samurai: Switched on Rock featured electronic synthesizer renditions of contemporary rock and pop songs. Other early examples of electronic rock records include Inoue Yousui's folk rock and pop rock album Ice World (1973) and Osamu Kitajima's progressive psychedelic rock album Benzaiten (1974), both of which involved contributions from Haruomi Hosono, who later started the techno pop music group "Yellow Magic Band" (later known as Yellow Magic Orchestra) in 1977.

=== 1980s to 1990s ===
==== Punk, original band boom ====
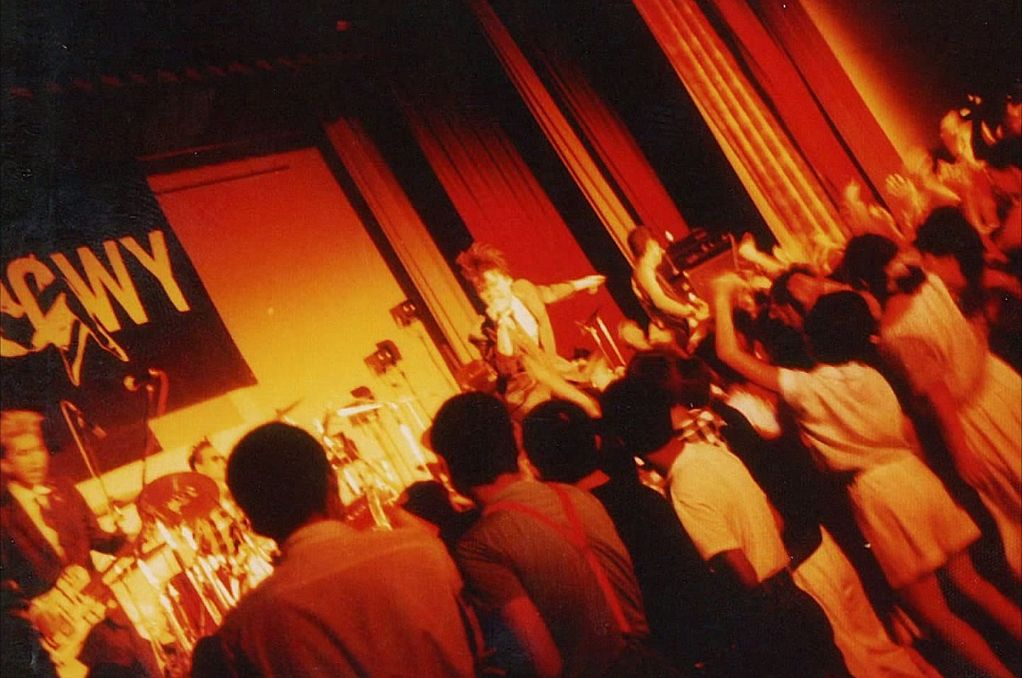
Boøwy performing in 1984

Early examples of Japanese punk rock include SS, the Star Club, the Stalin, Inu, Gaseneta, Bomb Factory, Lizard (who were produced by the Stranglers) and Friction (whose guitarist Reck had previously played with Teenage Jesus and the Jerks before returning to Tokyo) and the Blue Hearts. The early punk scene was immortalized on film by Sogo Ishii, who directed the 1982 film Burst City featuring a cast of punk bands/musicians and also filmed videos for The Stalin. The independent scene also included a diverse number of alternative/post-punk/new wave artists such as Aburadako, P-Model, Uchoten, Auto-Mod, Buck-Tick, Guernica and Yapoos (both of which featured Jun Togawa), G-Schmitt, Totsuzen Danball, and Jagatara, along with noise/industrial bands such as Hijokaidan and Hanatarashi.

In the 1980s, acts such as Boøwy inspired what is called the "Band Boom" (バンドブーム, Bando Būmu), popularizing the formation of rock groups. In 1980, Huruoma and Ry Cooder, an American musician, collaborated on a rock album with Shoukichi Kina, driving force behind the aforementioned Okinawan band Champloose. They were followed by Sandii & the Sunsetz, who further mixed Japanese and Okinawan influences. Alternative rock bands like Shonen Knife, Bloodthirsty Butchers, Boredoms, and The Pillows formed. Nirvana's Kurt Cobain admitted to be a fan of Shonen Knife during the girls' tour in the LA in 1991. Cobain later invited the band to join them in a U.S. tour.

==== Visual kei ====
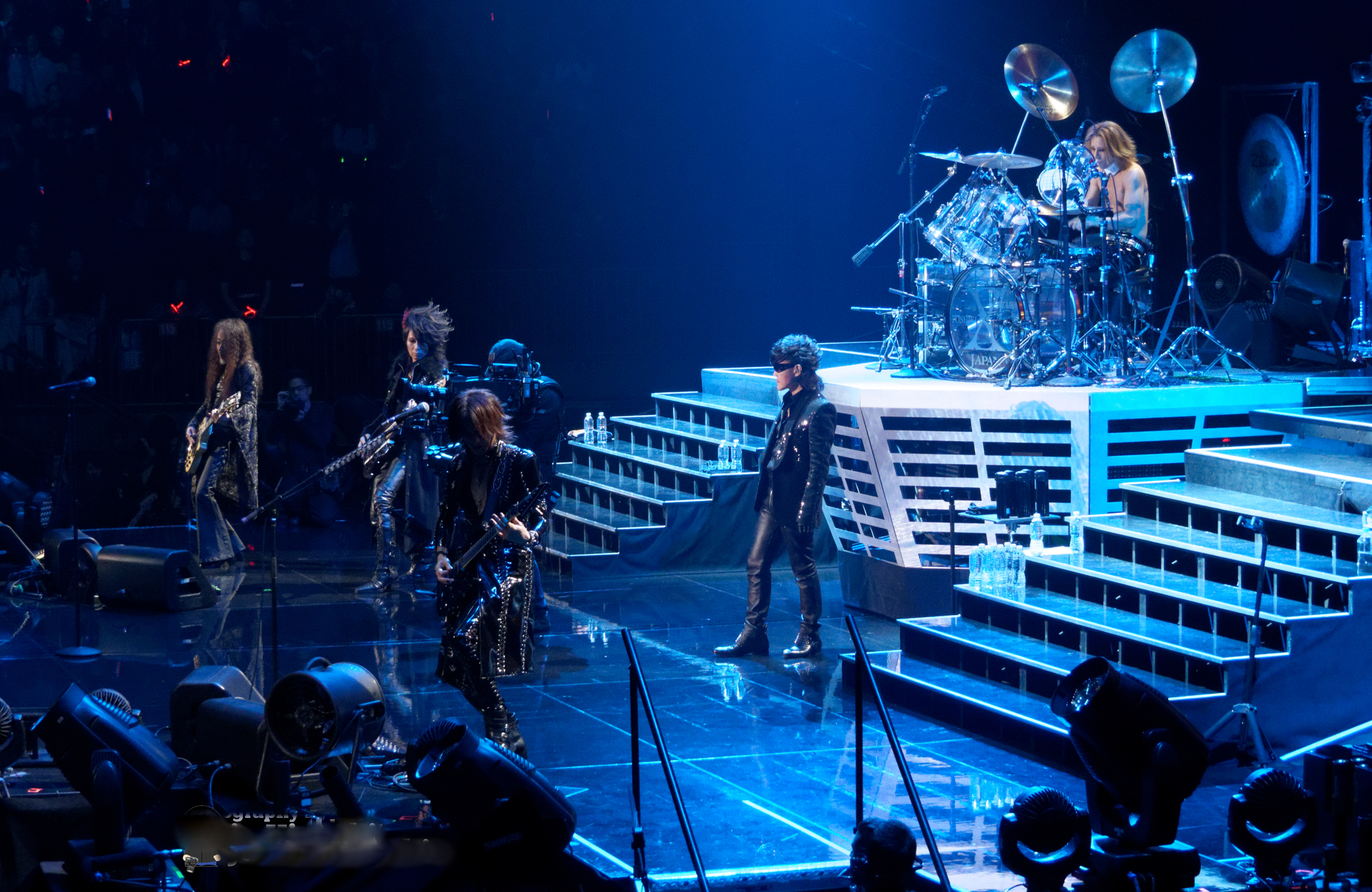
X Japan at Madison Square Garden in 2014

Also during the 1980s, Japanese metal and rock bands gave birth to the movement known as visual kei. Taking visual influence from Western glam rock and glam metal, it was pioneered by bands like X Japan, Dead End, Buck-Tick, D'erlanger, and Color. Although starting in the early 1980s, it was not until the tail-end of the decade that visual kei acts saw major success. Buck-Tick's 1988 album Seventh Heaven reached number 3 on the Oricon chart, and its follow-ups Taboo (1989) and Aku no Hana (1990) both topped it.

In April 1989, X Japan's second album Blue Blood reached number 6 and sold 712,000 copies. Their third and best-selling album Jealousy was released in July 1991, topped the charts and sold over 1 million copies. They released two more number one studio albums, Art of Life (1993) and Dahlia (1996), before disbanding in 1997. X Japan signed an American record deal with Atlantic Records in 1992, but an international release never happened. In the 1990s, Luna Sea, Glay, and L'Arc-en-Ciel sold millions of records, while Malice Mizer, La'cryma Christi, and Siam Shade also found success.

=== 1990s to 2000s: Peak and later developments ===
In the 1990s, Japanese rock musicians such as B'z, Mr. Children, Glay, L'Arc-en-Ciel, Southern All Stars, Malice Mizer, Dir En Grey, Shazna, Janne Da Arc, Tube, Spitz, Wands, T-Bolan, Judy and Mary, Deen, Lindberg, Sharam Q, the Yellow Monkey, the Brilliant Green and Dragon Ash achieved commercial success. B'z is the best selling artist in Japan with over 86 million confirmed records sold and they are speculated to have sold 100 million worldwide. The duo are also the first Asian band to be inducted in the Hollywood's RockWalk.

In the 1990s, anime was becoming the best-selling genres of music in Japan. The rise of disposable pop has been linked with the popularity of karaoke, leading to criticism that it is consumerist: Kazufumi Miyazawa of the Boom said "I hate that buy, listen, and throw away and sing at a karaoke bar mentality." Ska-punk bands of the late 1990s extending in the years 2000 include Shakalabbits and 175R.

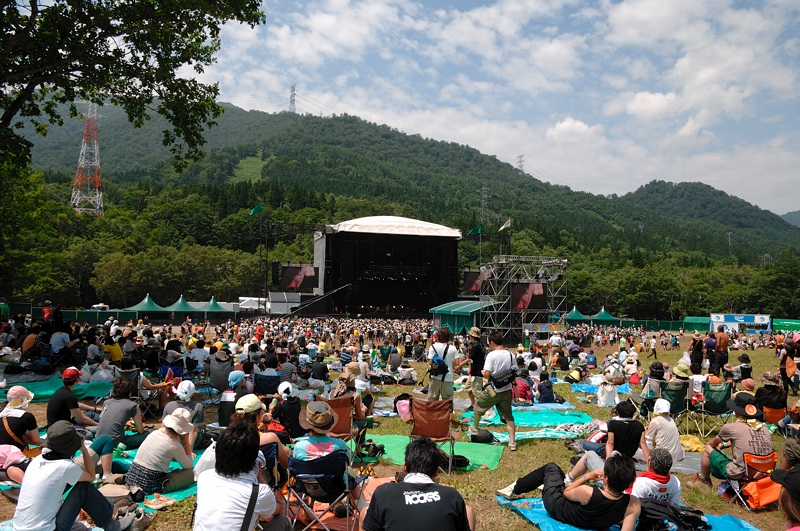
Green Stage of the Fuji Rock Festival

The first Fuji Rock Festival opened in 1997. The following year, Supercar released its influential debut album Three Out Change. Characterized as having "almost foundational importance to 21st century Japanese indie rock", Supercar remained active through 2005 with their later albums containing more electronic rock.

Around the same time, bands such as Quruli and Number Girl had begun heavily influencing Japanese alternative rock. Music critic Ian Martin wrote that, along with Supercar, these groups had demonstrated that "Japanese rock bands could take on the British and American alternative bands of the 90s at their own game ... and in doing so, they had laid new ground for Japanese rock to develop in its own way from this point on."

Rising Sun Rock Festival opened in 1999. Summer Sonic Festival and Rock in Japan Festival opened in 2000. New bands such as Bump of Chicken, Radwimps, Asian Kung-Fu Generation, ONE OK ROCK, Orange Range, Uverworld, Remioromen, Sambomaster, and Aqua Timez have achieved success. Established bands as B'z, Mr. Children, Glay, and L'Arc-en-Ciel also continue to top charts, though B'z and Mr. Children are the only bands to maintain a high standards of their sales along the years.

Japanese rock has a vibrant underground rock scene, best known internationally for noise rock bands such as Boredoms and Melt Banana, as well as stoner rock bands such as Boris and alternative acts such as Shonen Knife, Pizzicato Five, and the Pillows (who gained international attention in 1999 for the FLCL soundtrack). Other notable international touring indie rock acts are Mono and Nisennenmondai.

In the 2000s, the number of all-female rock bands all-female band started to grow. Two of the first of such groups to achieve success were Zone and Chatmonchy. Zone, which was planned to be an idol group, became a rock band thanks to one of their producers, who had decided to let them play with instruments, and was well received.

Scandal, a quartet form Osaka, was created in 2006 and sold 52,956 copies of their debut album in 2009. Later, their albums also became top ten bestsellers. This success led them to become famous worldwide and later took them on several tours abroad. In 2018, Scandal established their own label "her". In August 2023, Scandal was recognized by the Guinness World Record for being the longest-running all-female rock band with the same founding members.

=== The 2010s ===
==== New band boom, further overseas recognition ====
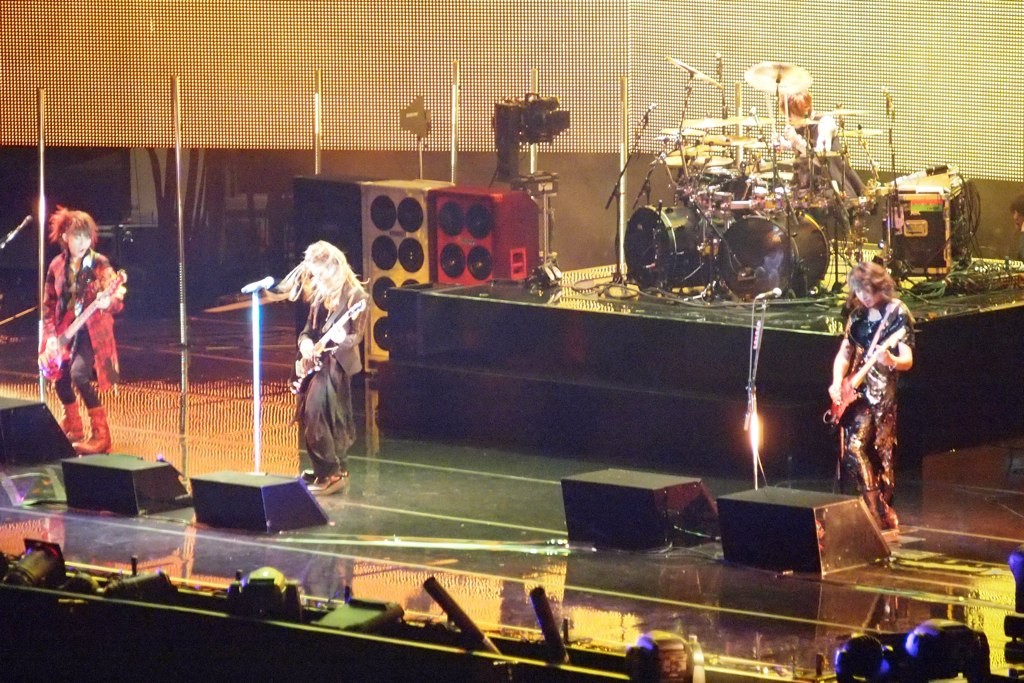
L'Arc-en-Ciel performing at Madison Square Garden in 2012, the first Japanese act to headline the venue

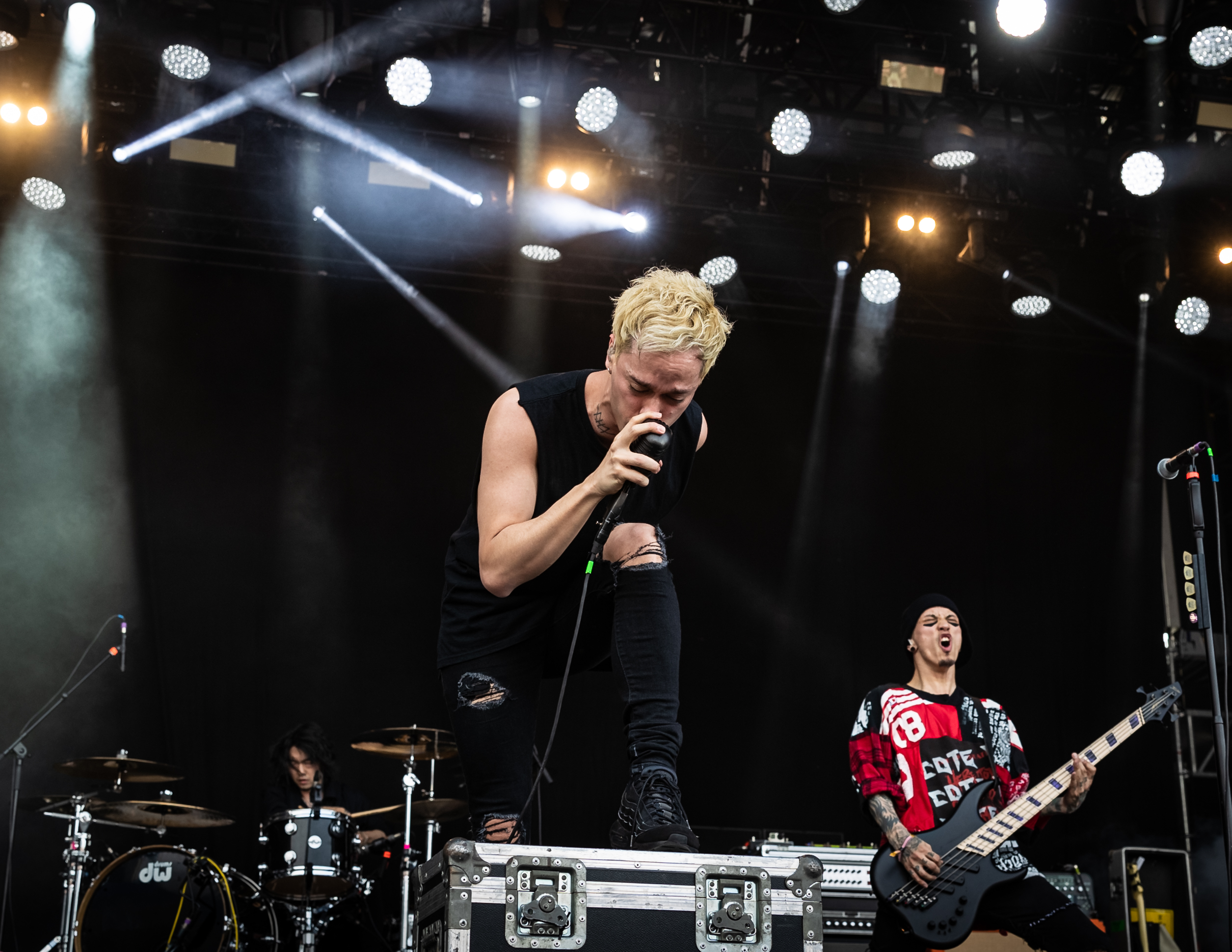
Post-hardcore band Coldrain performing in 2019. One of the few Japanese rock bands who write and sing all of their music in English.

During the late 2000s there was an increasing number of bands that had built up a strong fan base prior to their main break-through in the music industry. Indie band flumpool sold over one million copies of their first digital single "Hana ni nare". Sakanaction performed their first live concert at Nippon Budokan while enjoying major success with their singles "Aruku Around" and "Rookie". Sakanaction was pinned as a different type of band since they experimented with electronic music and synthrock. Other bands that have gone mainstream included Gesu no Kiwami Otome, Sekai no Owari, and Alexandros. Because of the sudden major increase on indie bands and rock bands in general which competed with contemporary J-Pop artists, the movement has been referred to as a band boom by the media and has been praised as a change to the Japanese music in general. Since these bands don't rely in a very heavy sound but take a softer, catchier approach, they proved to be more appealing to pop fans that are not familiar with rock.

Veteran rock bands like L'Arc-en-Ciel and X Japan sold out concerts at Madison Square Garden in 2012 and 2014, respectively, among other large arenas through the United States. As of 2015, slap-guitarist Miyavi, who had performed the most successful international tour by a Japanese artist in 2008, has performed at 250 concerts in more than thirty countries around the world. In 2016, One OK Rock became the first Japanese band to perform at the Taipei Arena in Taiwan, and it has sold out concerts at venues such as AsiaWorld-Arena in Hong Kong and Mall of Asia Arena in the Philippines, making it one of the band's biggest performances outside of Japan, with an average attendance of twelve thousand people at each concert.

==== Girls Metal Band Boom ====
The decade saw a "Girls Metal Band Boom" (ガールズ・メタル・バンド・ブーム), with a large number of all-female heavy metal bands forming and gaining mainstream attention. Although not the first to form, Aldious have been cited as the initiators of the movement when their debut album Deep Exceed (2010) topped the Oricon Indies Albums Chart and reached number 15 on the main chart. Another notable girls metal band is Cyntia, who are believed to be the first of the movement to sign to a major record label when they joined Victor Entertainment in 2013.

The year 2014 brought the international success of self-described "kawaii metal" idol act Babymetal, through the viral YouTube hit "Gimme Chocolate!!". They were the opening act to five of Lady Gaga's concerts on her ArtRave: The Artpop Ball 2014 tour. In 2016, Babymetal began a world tour at London's Wembley Arena, becoming the first Japanese act to headline the venue, and their album Metal Resistance reached number 15 on the UK Albums Chart, marking the highest ever entry by a Japanese act. They also made their US television debut by performing "Gimme Chocolate!!" on The Late Show with Stephen Colbert.

Band-Maid earned worldwide attention circa 2015 for their "submissive" maid appearance contrasting with their aggressive music. They began international activities the following year, including signing to JPU Records.

In 2018, Lovebites won the Metal Hammer Golden Gods Awards for Best New Band and became the first Japanese all-female heavy metal band to perform at Germany's Wacken Open Air.

== See also ==
- List of Japanese rock music groups
- J-pop
- Music of Japan
