= Eiichi Ohtaki =

Japanese musician, singer-songwriter, and record producer (1948–2013)

- Eiichi Ohtaki in 1981 promoting A Long Vacation

Background information
- Also known as: Eiichi Ohtaki (大滝 詠一); Eiichi Ohtaki (大瀧 詠一)
- Born: Eiichi Ohtaki (大瀧 榮一); July 28, 1948; Esashi District, Japan
- Died: December 30, 2013 (aged 65) Mizuho, Tokyo, Japan
- Genres: City pop
- Occupations: Musician; singer-songwriter; record producer
- Instruments: Vocals; guitar
- Years active: 1969–2013
- Labels: King; Niagara; Columbia; CBS/Sony
- Formerly of: Happy End

Eiichi Ohtaki (Note: Ohtaki used three different ways to spell his name in Japanese, all pronounced the same way. He used the characters 大瀧 詠一 to spell his name in songwriting credits, and 大滝 詠一 as a singer.) (Japanese: 大瀧 榮一, Hepburn: Ōtaki Eiichi; July 28, 1948 – December 30, 2013) was a Japanese musician, singer-songwriter and record producer. He first became known as a member of the rock band Happy End, but was better known for his solo work which began in 1972. In 2003, Ohtaki was ranked by HMV at number 9 on their list of the 100 most important Japanese pop acts. Patrick Macias referred to Ohtaki as Phil Spector, Brian Wilson, George Martin and Joe Meek "synthesized into a single human being," and called his work "an encyclopedia of everything that was great about pop music in the 20th century."

== Biography ==
Ohtaki was born in Esashi District, in what is now part of Ōshū. Before joining Happy End, Ohtaki was guitarist in a group called Taboo with future Blues Creation singer Fumio Nunoya. Happy End produced three albums, Happy End (1970), Kazemachi Roman (1971) and Happy End (1973), before officially disbanding on New Year's Eve 1972. Ohtaki had already released his first self-titled solo album back in November 1972, which Macias described as probably just what Happy End fans expected; "tuneful folk-rock" and "fuzzed out country rock nuggets ala Neil Young." However, Macias noted that this is the last time Ohtaki would create music like this in his career.

He produced the rock band Sugar Babe, and continued to produce its members Taeko Onuki and Tatsuro Yamashita after the group's break up. Their only album Songs was the first release on Ohtaki's record label Niagara Records in 1975. Ohtaki's second album, Niagara Moon, followed a month later. Macias called it a record "where the artist is clearly having more fun than the listener" as it lacks truly memorable hooks and has "juxtapositions [that] are often more jarring than impressive."

Ohtaki, Yamashita and brief Sugar Babe member Ginji Ito released an album titled Niagara Triangle Vol. 1 in 1976. The collaboration was cited by MTV as one of the six Japanese supergroups that changed the history of Japanese music. Later that year Ohtaki's third album Go! Go! Niagara was released. Although stating that the "kitchen sink abandon" from Niagara Moon was repeated, Macias felt that on this album the singer "hits a home run every time" by flat out recreating the beloved records of his youth, instead of simply trying to evoke them.

Macias stated that although Ohtaki had done almost everything on 1977's Niagara Calendar before; citing the "merenge [sic], wall-of-sound, Okinawan music, and odes to baseball," the difference is his increased vocal abilities deliver "another completely dazzling LP." Although he produced all and wrote several of the songs on 1978's Let's Ondo Again, Ohtaki only sang a handful of them. The album is credited to "Niagara Fallin' Stars" and features various other singers such as Rats & Star and Masayuki Suzuki. Peter Barakan noted that the songs parody Western music and called the album a masterpiece.

Ohtaki's 1981 solo album A Long Vacation is particularly well-known and highly acclaimed. It was one of the first albums to be issued on CD, won Best Album at the 23rd Japan Record Awards, certified double platinum by the RIAJ and has been re-released in 20th anniversary and 30th anniversary editions. In 2007, it was named the 7th greatest Japanese rock album of all time by Rolling Stone Japan.

Ohtaki released Niagara Triangle Vol. 2 in 1982, this time collaborating with Motoharu Sano and Masamichi Sugi.

Following his 1984 album Each Time and its 1985 single "Fjord Girl" (フィヨルドの少女), Ohtaki largely retired from activities as a solo artist. Instead he focused on composing for and producing other acts. In 1997, he released the single "Shiawase na Ketsumatsu" (幸せな結末), which was used as the theme song for the TV drama Love Generation and sold over a million copies. The single "Koisuru Futari" (恋するふたり) was released in 2003 and used as the theme song for Tokyo Love Cinema.

== Death ==
After choking on an apple and collapsing in his Mizuho, Tokyo home at 5 p.m. on December 30, 2013, Ohtaki was rushed to a hospital but died shortly afterwards. His official cause of death was a dissecting aneurysm.

Ohtaki was posthumously honored with a Lifetime Achievement Award at the 56th Japan Record Awards in 2014. In March 2016, an album of previously unreleased material titled Debut Again was released posthumously. Referred to as his first album in 32 years, it features Ohtaki singing songs that he composed but which were originally released by other artists. The album Happy Ending was released on March 21, 2020 to celebrate the 50th anniversary of Ohtaki's debut. It collects previously unreleased songs that were created during sessions for the TV drama themes he wrote in the 1990s.

== Discography ==
Studio albums

- Ohtaki Eiichi (大瀧詠一) (King/Bellwood, 1972)
- Niagara Moon (Elec/Niagara, 1975)
- Go! Go! Niagara (Nippon Columbia/Niagara, 1976)
- Niagara CM Special Vol.1 (Nippon Columbia/Niagara, 1977)
- Niagara Calendar '78 (Nippon Columbia/Niagara, 1977)
- Debut (Nippon Columbia/Niagara, 1978)
- Let's Ondo Again (Nippon Columbia/Niagara, 1978) – credited to Niagara Fallin' Stars
- A Long Vacation (Sony/Niagara, 1981)
- Niagara Calendar '81 (Sony/Niagara, 1981)
- Niagara CM Special Vol.2 (Sony/Niagara, 1982)
- Each Time (Sony/Niagara, 1984)
- B-EACH TIME L-ONG (Sony/Niagara, 1985)
- Debut Again (Sony/Niagara, 2016)
- Happy Ending (Sony/Niagara, 2020)

Niagara Triangle albums

- Niagara Triangle Vol. 1 (1976) – with Tatsuro Yamashita and Ginji Ito
- Niagara Triangle Vol. 2 (1982) – with Motoharu Sano and Masamichi Sugi
