= Kirikyogen =

Studio album by Kuni Kawachi & His Friends
- Released: 1970
- Recorded: 1970
- Genre: Progressive rock, psychedelic rock, heavy metal
- Length: 36:47
- Label: London/King

Kirikyogen (Japanese: 切狂言, Hepburn: Kirikyōgen) is a 1970 album by Japanese musician Kuni Kawachi, credited to "Kuni Kawachi & His Friends" (クニ河内とかれのともだち, Kuni Kawachi to Kare no Tomodachi), though it is usually credited to "Kuni Kawachi & Flower Travellin' Band" on bootlegs. The album showcases Kuni Kawachi's progressive rock influences, as well as the growing heavy metal sound that the Flower Travellin' Band were honing.

== Overview ==
It is the first album released by Kuni Kawachi after leaving the group sounds band the Happenings Four. Although usually co-credited to the Flower Travellin' Band on bootlegs, only vocalist Joe Yamanaka and guitarist Hideki Ishima took part in the album. It was recorded between Anywhere and Satori, before the band went to Canada. Ishima later recalled that this was the first time he heard Yamanaka sing in Japanese, an experience he referred to as "strange".

In 1971, the song "Works Composed Mainly by Humans" was reworked, renamed "Map" and released as a split single by Flower Travellin' Band without Kawachi, together with the song "Machine Gun Kelly" by American band Jo Mama.

Kirikyogen was later released on CD by King Records in 1994. In 2002, it was bootlegged under the name Music Composed Mainly By Humans, which replaced "To Your World" with the live track "I'm Dead" and renamed "Classroom for Women" to simply "Classroom". This bootleg also included "Map", as previously released by Flower Travellin' Band, instead of the original song "Works Composed Mainly by Humans".

== Reception ==
Musician and author Julian Cope included Kirikyogen at number 25 on his list of the top 50 albums of Japanese rock, as found in his 2007 book Japrocksampler. He described it as an entire album of classic songs, with side one composed of "dry, spaced-out and highly original hard-rocking ballads" and side two being "possessed of a hitherto unseen acoustic side of Hideki Ishima's [guitar] playing."

Hernan M. Campbell of Sputnikmusic wrote that with this album the Flower Travellin' Band began "cultivating a heavily dissonant guitar style that emphasized on a low-tuned sound and slower tempos, thus giving their music a more menacing characteristic." Together with Satori, he cited Kirikyogen as playing a part in the creation of doom metal.

== Track listing ==
Side A
No.	Title	Length
1.	"Kirikyogen" (Kirikyōgen (Shibaigoya no Mei Yakusha) (切狂言（芝居小屋の名役者）))	5:09
2.	"Works Composed Mainly by Humans" (Ningen Shutai no Keiei to Kōji (人間主体の経営と工事))	5:46
3.	"Time Machine" (Taimu Mashīn (タイム・マシーン))	7:48

Side B
No.	Title	Length
4.	"To Your World..." (Omae no Sekai e...... (おまえの世界へ......))	6:33
5.	"Graveyard of Love" (Ren Ai Bochi (恋愛墓地))	4:11
6.	"Classroom for Women" (Onna no Kyōshitsu (女の教室))	3:26
7.	"Scientific Investigation" (Otoko Kara Onna o Mita Kagaku-teki Chōsa (男から女を見た科学的調査))	3:54

== Credits ==
- Kuni Kawachi - keyboards
- Joe Yamanaka - vocals
- Hideki Ishima - guitars
- Pepe Yoshihiro - bass
- Chito Kawachi - drums
- Yuya Uchida - producer

== See also ==
- 1970 in Japanese music
