= Japanese reggae =

J-reggae
- Stylistic origins: Reggae - Contemporary R&B - J-pop
- Cultural origins: Late 1970s Japan
- Typical instruments: Bass - Drums - Guitar - Organ - Brass instrument - Melodica - Sampler - Bass - Synthesizer - Drum machine

Other topics
- Reggae fusion

Japanese reggae is reggae music originating from Japan. The first reggae band to perform in Japan was The Pioneers who toured in 1975. However it was not until 1979, when Jamaican singer Bob Marley visited Japan on holiday that reggae would gain momentum. Marley wanted to attend a concert by the Flower Travellin Band and when looking for information, he met famed Japanese percussionist "Pecker" who informed him that the group had already disbanded. The two became good friends, and Pecker suggested to Marley a collaboration between acclaimed Japanese and Jamaican artists. This suggestion resulted in the albums Pecker Power, and Instant Rasta being recorded in Jamaica at "Channel One" and "Tuff Gong Studio" in 1980. The albums featured Japanese artists Minako Yoshida (吉田美奈子), Ryuuichi Sakamoto (坂本龍一), Naoya Matsuoka (松岡直也), Shigeharu Mukai (向井滋春), and Akira Sakata (坂田明), alongside Jamaican artists Augustus Pablo, Sly & Robbie, The Wailers, Rico Rodriguez, Carlton Barrett and Marcia Griffiths. These two albums influenced both Japanese and Jamaican artists, and are regarded as spreading reggae to Japan.

Some of the first reggae artists from Japan were Joe Yamanaka and Mute Beat, the latter's recordings made Japan internationally renowned for dub and influenced many artists such as Dry & Heavy, Fishmans, UA. Another pioneering artist was Nahki. He was scouted by Sugar Minott and began performing in Jamaica, and later formed Japan's first reggae festival "Japansplash" in 1985. The esteemed band Jagatara (じゃがたら) combined punk rock, jazz, and funk with reggae and influenced hybrid artists such as Ego-Wrappin'. The dancehall style was brought to Japan by Rankin' Taxi in the mid-1980s, and rock group The Roosters incorporated ska into some of their songs which influenced artists such as the Tokyo Ska Paradise Orchestra, and Kemuri.

Musical relations between Jamaican and Japanese artists remains strong, often with collaborations between artists.

The most important reggae festival is the Yokohama reggae festival or Yokohama Reggae Sai, which is usually in July to September, and has been moved to nearby Kawasaki.

== See also ==
- Reggae fusion
- Reggae
