= Make Up (album) =

Compilation album by Flower Travellin' Band

Studio album and Live album by Flower Travellin' Band
- Released: February 1973
- Recorded: Mouri Studio, Tokyo; Yokosuka Bunka Kaikan, Yokosuka
- Genre: Psychedelic rock; progressive rock
- Length: 73:51
- Label: Atlantic
- Producer: Yuya Uchida, Ikuzo Orita

Flower Travellin' Band chronology
| Made in Japan (1972) | Make Up (1973) | We Are Here (2008) |

Make Up is the fourth album by Japanese rock band Flower Travellin' Band, released in February 1973. It is a double album, featuring both live and studio recordings.

== Production ==
After returning from Canada, Flower Travellin' Band began a new album. The mix of live and studio recordings was planned from the beginning. Wanting a mix of sounds, they tried acoustic pieces and experimented with material that would be hard to reproduce live. Growing as a band and as individuals, more individual contributions were made.

Tracks 1, 2, 5, 7 and 8 were recorded live at Yokosuka Bunka Kaikan in Yokosuka on September 16, 1972, while track 9 is a live studio recording. The band's founder and producer Yuya Uchida provides guest vocals on "Blue Suede Shoes".

"Slowly But Surely" was covered by thrash metal band Outrage for their 1988 first album, Black Clouds. "Hiroshima" and the title track were covered by Cult of Personality and thrash metal band United respectively, for the 2000 Flower Travellin' Band Tribute album. "Broken Strings" was sampled by The Carters on the song "Black Effect" on their album Everything Is Love.

== Reception ==
Professional ratings
Review scores
| Source | Rating |
|---|---|
| Allmusic | 3/5 stars |

Eduardo Rivadavia of Allmusic referred to Make Up as confused and "inconsistent to say the least", giving it a 3 star rating out of five. Aquarius Records and the Roadburn Festival were mostly positive in a review, writing that the first two sides show the band's more mellow and pop side, "with the gentle epic ‘Look at My Window’, the bluesy, balladic ‘Shadows of Lost Days’, and the sad ‘Broken Strings’ all probably prompting lighter-raising among concert goers." But stated that the title-track, "Slowly But Surely" and "All the Days" provide heavier fare. They then approved of the 24-minute live version of "Hiroshima", describing it as "chock full of the type of slightly sinister, blown-out riffage that today’s stoner rockers try their hardest to recreate." They finished by claiming the semi-acoustic "spaced out ‘After the Concert’ winds things up wordlessly and beautifully."

== Track listing ==
Side A
| No. | Title | Songwriters | Length |
|---|---|---|---|
| 1. | "All the Days" | Hideki Ishima, Joe Yamanaka, Patti | 6:38 |
| 2. | "Make Up" | Flower Travellin' Band, Patti | 2:53 |
| 3. | "Look at My Window" | Flower Travellin' Band, Patti | 10:56 |

Side B
| No. | Title | Songwriters | Length |
|---|---|---|---|
| 4. | "Slowly But Surely" | George Wada, Joe Yamanaka, Patti | 6:06 |
| 5. | "Shadow of Lost Days" | George Wada, Joe Yamanaka, Patti | 4:44 |
| 6. | "Broken Strings" | Jun Kozuki | 7:19 |

Side C
| No. | Title | Songwriters | Length |
|---|---|---|---|
| 7. | "Hiroshima" | Hideki Ishima, Yoko Nomura | 23:56 |

Side D
| No. | Title | Songwriters | Length |
|---|---|---|---|
| 8. | "Blue Suede Shoes" | Carl Lee Perkins | 3:55 |
| 9. | "Satori Pt. 2" | Flower Travellin' Band | 9:48 |
| 10. | "After the Concert" | Flower Travellin' Band | 7:24 |

== Credits ==
- Joe Yamanaka – vocals, percussion
- Hideki Ishima – lead guitar, acoustic guitar
- Jun Kozuki – bass, acoustic guitar
- George Wada – drums
- Nobuhiko Shinohara – keyboards
- Yuya Uchida – vocals on "Blue Suede Shoes", producer
- Ikuzo Orita – producer
