= Challenge (album) =

Challenge!

Studio album by Yuya Uchida & The Flowers
- Released: July 25, 1969
- Genre: Psychedelic rock
- Length: 43:29
- Label: Nippon Columbia

Yuya Uchida & The Flowers chronology
Challenge! (1969)	Anywhere (1970)

Challenge! is the debut studio album by Japanese rock band Flower Travellin' Band, then called Yuya Uchida & The Flowers, released in 1969. It features mainly cover songs, and was a means for Yuya Uchida to explore the emerging psychedelic rock movement outside his own career, and to introduce the work of upcoming Western bands such as Cream, Big Brother and the Holding Company, The Jimi Hendrix Experience, Jefferson Airplane to a Japanese audience. It was named number 34 on Bounce's 2009 list of 54 Standard Japanese Rock Albums.

== Overview ==
Shocked after seeing Jimi Hendrix perform in London in 1967, Yuya Uchida returned home and wanted to introduce a similar sound to Japan. He formed "the Flowers" as a cover band with various group sounds musicians, and two vocalists; male singer Hiroshi Chiba and female singer Remi Aso. The album also gained notoriety for featuring all of the band members nude on the cover.

Following its release, Uchida dropped all the members, except drummer George Wada, recruited guitarist Hideki Ishima, vocalist Joe Yamanaka and bassist Jun Kobayashi, and formed the Flower Travellin' Band as a band that would appeal to international audiences. Uchida himself reverted exclusively to the producer/manager role. Their first album, Anywhere, mirrored Challenge! by mainly consisting of cover songs and nude cover art.

On September 26, 2007, a limited edition of Challenge! was released with five bonus tracks. They are "Last Chance", "Flower Boy" and "Yogiri no Trumpet" which were previously released as singles in 1969, and the previously unreleased covers of "Fire" and "Five to One".

== Track listing ==
Side 1
No.	Title	Lyrics	Music	Length
1.	"Combination of the Two" (Big Brother and the Holding Company cover)	S. Andrew	S. Andrew	5:58
2.	"Intruder" (Big Brother and the Holding Company cover)	J. Joplin	J. Joplin	3:54
3.	"Summertime" (George Gershwin cover, in the style of Big Brother and the Holding Company)	D. Heyward	G. Gershwin	3:54
4.	"I'm So Glad" (Skip James cover, in the style of Cream)	N.S. James	N.S. James	4:22
5.	"Greasy Heart" (Jefferson Airplane cover)	G. Slick	G. Slick	4:12

Side 2
No.	Title	Lyrics	Music	Length
6.	"Hey Joe" (Billy Roberts cover, in the style of Jimi Hendrix)	B. Roberts	B. Roberts	4:11
7.	"White Room" (Cream cover)	P. Brown	J. Bruce	4:03
8.	"Hidariashi no Otoko" (左足の男)		K. Kobayashi	4:37
9.	"Piece of My Heart" (Erma Franklin cover, in the style of Big Brother and the Holding Company)	J. Ragovoy	B. Berns	4:01
10.	"Stone Free" (The Jimi Hendrix Experience cover)	J. Hendrix	J. Hendrix	3:52

2007 Limited edition bonus tracks
No.	Title	Lyrics	Music	Length
11.	"Fire" (The Crazy World of Arthur Brown cover)	A. Brown, V. Crane, M. Finesilver, P. Ker	A. Brown, V. Crane, M. Finesilver, P. Ker
12.	"Five to One" (The Doors cover)	J. Morrison	J. Morrison
13.	"Last Chance"	J. Hashimoto	T. Inoue
14.	"Flower Boy"	J. Hashimoto	K. Tsutsumi
15.	"Yogiri no Trumpet" (夜霧のトランペッ)	J. Hashimoto	K. Tsutsumi

== Personnel ==
- Remi Aso – vocals, guitar
- Kento Nakamura – vocals
- Ken Hashimoto – bass
- Susumu Oku – guitar, vocals
- Katsuhiko Kobayashi – steel guitar
- Yuya Uchida – percussion, backing vocals, producer
- Joji "George" Wada – drums
