= Satori (disambiguation) =

Satori is a Japanese term from Zen-Buddhism.

Satori may also refer to:

- Satori (Flower Travellin' Band album), 1971
  - Satori (Flower Travellin' Band Canadian album), the Canadian version of the album
- Satori (Lee Konitz album), 1974
- Satori (I the Mighty album), 2013
- Satori (folklore), a monkey-like monster from Japanese folklore
- Satori (Schmidt novel), a 1981 science fiction novel by Dennis Schmidt
- Satori (Winslow novel), a 2011 historical novel by Don Winslow

== People with the given name ==
- Satori Kato (カトウ サトリ), Japanese chemist

== Fictional characters ==
- Satori, a character in One Piece
- Satori Komeiji, a character in Subterranean Animism from the Touhou Project series
- Nova Satori, a character in Robotech
- Satori Deacon, a character in PS238
