= Deadly Outlaw: Rekka =

- Directed by: Takashi Miike
- Written by: Shigenori Takechi
- Cinematography: Kiyoshi Itô
- Edited by: Yasushi Shimamura
- Music by: Joe Yamanaka
- Release date: 2002
- Running time: 96 minutes

Deadly Outlaw: Rekka, also known as Violent Fire, is a 2002 Japanese yakuza film directed by Takashi Miike starring Riki Takeuchi and Sonny Chiba. Known in Japan as Jitsuroku: Andō Noboru Kyōdō-den - Rekka (実録・安藤昇侠道伝 烈火; "Noboru Ando's True Outlaw Tales: Raging Fire"), it is loosely based on actor Noboru Ando's former life as a yakuza.

== Plot ==
The half-Korean yakuza Arata Kunisada's father figure Yoshikatsu Sanada is brutally murdered by a member of the Otaki Group. Hijikata, Head Kanbu of the Bando Family, has agreed to mediate a truce between the groups, while Makajyo and Komuro, members of the Otaki group secretly conspire with Kugihara, Sanada's successor in the Sanada Group, to have their leader Chairman Otaki murdered by an expendable member of the Sanada Group in "retaliation". Kugihara suggests to Kunisada that a truce would not enable the Sanada Group to save face and Kunisada takes the bait and sets out to murder Chairman Otaki.

Kunisada and his best friend Eiichi Shimatani give severance payments to the junior yakuza Hiroshi Fujiwara, Saburo Sawada, and Tomio, telling them not to follow. Hiroshi and Saburo refuse to leave the Group and choose to remain loyal, while Tomio accepts the payment and retires from the Sanada Group. Kunisada finds Chairman Otaki at a hospital and kills him. However, members of the Otaki clan show up afterwards to kill Chairman Otaki's mistress and bodyguards. At the mediation, it is agreed between the leaders of the groups that Kugihara will allow Kunisada to be killed by members of the Otaki Group as a condition of the truce. Kugihara's right-hand man Iguchi calls Kunisada and lures him to a location to be ambushed but Kunisada and Shimatani kill the attackers. The two men send away Myung-hyung and Sung-hee, Korean prostitutes who have been tagging along with them.

Police detective Asai explains to Kunisada that the murders of Sanada and Otaki were part of a plot by Makajyo to rise to power. Already having paid them to kill Sanada, Makajyo once again hires the killers Mr. Su and Tabata to attack the Sanada Group and kill Kunisada. The killers first torture Hiroshi and Saburo, who know nothing and are killed. Kunisada shoots Igushi dead in a gambling den then fires a rocket into Bando headquarters. After Kunisada kills Makajyo by firing a rocket into his office, Mr. Su and Tabata hunt them down but fail to kill them. The films ends with the retired yakuza Tomio living a normal life doing his laundry at a laundromat.

== Cast ==
- Riki Takeuchi - Arata Kunisada (国貞新太/아라타 쿠니사다)
- Ken'ichi Endō - Eiichi Shimatani (島谷英一)
- Ryōsuke Miki - Sudō (須藤)
- Yoshiyuki Yamaguchi - Gorō Tabata (田畑吾郎)
- Rikiya Yasuoka - Masakatsu Kugihara (釘原正勝)
- Kazuya Nakayama - Tadashi Iguchi (井口正)
- Joe Yamanaka - Nobuhiro Hiraoka (平岡信宏)
- Daijirō Harada - Nakajo (中条)
- Shinobu Yamaguti - Hisanobu Komuro (小室久信)
- Sonny Chiba - Yasunori Hijikata (土方康典)
- Masaru Shiga - Hideaki Asai (浅井秀明)
- Mika Katsumura - Myung-hyung (명형/ミョンヒョン)
- Miho Nomoto - Sung-hee (성희/ソンヒ)
- Saki Kurihara - Akemi (明美/あけみ)
- Renji Ishibashi - Otaki (大滝)
- Yuya Uchida - Yoshikatsu Sanada (真田義勝)
- Lily - Kunisada's godmother
- Tetsuro Tanba - Sanada (in Hakone)

== Other credits ==
- Produced by
  - Akira Ando - planner
  - Mitsuru Kurosawa - executive producer: Toei Video
  - Fujio Matsushima - associate planner
  - Tsuneo Seto - producer
  - Shigenori Takechi - associate planner
- Sound Department: Fusao Yuwaki - sound
- Supervisor: Noboru Ando

== Notes ==
The entire soundtrack to this film is the album Satori by Flower Travellin' Band, whose lead singer Joe Yamanaka and producer Yuya Uchida have small roles in the film.
