= Joe Yamanaka =

Japanese singer (1946–2011)

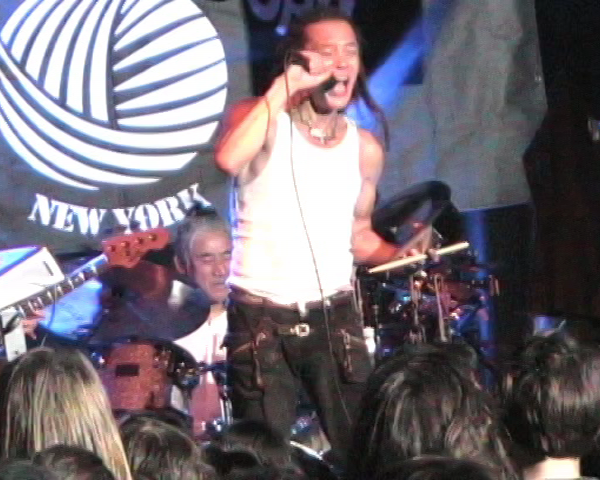
- Yamanaka with Flower Travellin' Band in New York City in 2008

Background information
- Also known as: Akira Jo (城アキラ)
- Born: Akira Yamanaka; September 2, 1946; Yokohama, Japan
- Died: August 7, 2011 (aged 64) Yokosuka, Japan
- Genres: Reggae; psychedelic rock; group sounds
- Occupations: Singer; musician; composer; actor; boxer
- Instruments: Vocals; guitar
- Years active: 1966–2011
- Formerly of: Flower Travellin' Band; The Wailers; 4.9.1
- Website: www.joe-yamanaka.com

Akira Yamanaka (Japanese: 山中 明, Hepburn: Yamanaka Akira; September 2, 1946 – August 7, 2011), better known as Joe Yamanaka (ジョー山中), was a Japanese singer and actor. He is known for both his work with Flower Travellin' Band and as a solo musician; singing at a vocal range of three octaves. As an actor, he appeared in many television shows and movies, such as Blackmail Is My Life (1968), Proof of the Man (1977), Zatoichi (1989) and Deadly Outlaw: Rekka (2002).

He is also recognized for 20 years of charity and volunteer work with the Japan International Cooperation Agency and flew around the world helping those in poor or war-torn conditions; visiting more than 30 countries including Afghanistan, Myanmar, Bosnia, numerous sovereign states in Africa, China, Ukraine (including Chernobyl), North Korea, Vietnam, Iraq, and Brazil. While doing aid work in Jamaica, he met local musicians and later became involved in reggae music. His aid work was a personal inspiration to help those who were growing up in similar conditions that he had experienced as a child.

== Biography ==
Akira Yamanaka was born in Yokohama, Japan, on September 2, 1946. He grew up in a family of seven children, though the only one of mixed descent as his father was a US Army soldier of Caribbean descent. In his autobiography, he mentions that he never met his biological father and that he came from a poor family in ruined Yokohama; being born in a brothel as his mother was a prostitute for the Recreation and Amusement Association. The only knowledge of his father was that he was a US soldier from either Cuba or Jamaica. Joe grew up in an orphanage after his mother and stepfather died. During an interview with Mainichi Shimbun, Akira stated that he was born with tuberculosis and that he never really thought about his biological father, believing that those who raised him were his real parents.

He left the orphanage at the age of 16 and became a boxer (inspired by his childhood idol Hiroyuki Ebihara) to earn money, he then met his lifelong friend Rikiya Yasuoka, who was a kickboxer of Japanese-Sicilian heritage. Yamanaka mentions that he adopted the English name Joe because it is the English pronunciation of his favorite painter, Keito Joh; with Joh meaning castle in Japanese. As a teenage boxer, he used the ring name Akira Jo (城アキラ). Joe and Rikiya decided to become actors and starred in the 1964 Japanese film Bicycle Thieves. Yamanaka's career changed once again, though he would continue to act until his death, when he met another lifelong friend, Johnny Yoshinaga, who persuaded him to become a musician. In 1966, he became a member of the group sounds band 4.9.1. Four years later, while in the blues band Mystic Morning with Hideki Ishima, the two of them were scouted by Yuya Uchida for Flower Travellin' Band. They went on to become successful, particularly in Canada where they lived for a while, and are now considered a pioneering and influential Japanese band.

In his acting career he was known as one of the three "real tough guys" in Japanese cinema, along with Tsunehiko Watase and Jerry Fujio. The trio were known for being good-natured, but with a rebellious past and noted fighting prowess. In his autobiography, Akira recounts the times during his youth when he was involved in violent fights. After a large brawl with members of the Zenkyoto in Hibiya Park in which he almost killed a man, the resulting police raid led him to an epiphany that "violence leads to nothing." Yamanaka starred as himself in the Hollywood action movie Ulterior Motives featuring Thomas Ian Griffith and Ellen Crawford. Three of Joe's songs were used in the film.

After Flower Travellin' Band disbanded in 1973, Joe started a solo career the following year. His most well-known song is "Proof of the Man" (人間の証明), which sold more than half a million copies, and is a household name throughout Asia. It is the theme song and namesake of the 1977 film Proof of the Man, which is based on a novel by Seiichi Morimura about war babies. Joe also has a small acting role in the film as a half Japanese, half African-American who is murdered, which the film is based around. In Chinese speaking countries the song is called "Old Straw Hat", taken from lyrics in the song. That same year, he was arrested on suspicion of violating the Cannabis Control Law.

He was close friends with numerous celebrities including Mickey Curtis and Yoko Ono. Joe recorded the entrance theme for Shinji Takehara titled "Hot Vibration" and composed the song "Sorrow of Florence" (哀しみのフローレンス) with his friend Amália Rodrigues. He later became the lead singer of The Wailers for around five years after his friend Bob Marley died.

In 2007, Flower Travellin' Band reunited and released an album the following year. They performed several concerts, including internationally in the US and Canada.

== Death ==
In March 2010, it was announced that Joe was diagnosed with lung cancer, which he learned in February. On September 6, his house was burned down after a lit cigarette was left unattended. In March of the following year Yamanaka participated in fundraising for relief from the 2011 Tōhoku earthquake and tsunami, and performed his last concert on May 5. He suffered cardiac arrest in late July. Joe died from his cancer on August 7, 2011, at 6:56 am, less than a month before his 65th birthday.

== Discography ==
=== Solo ===
Studio

- 1974 – Joe
- 1977 – To the New World (新しい世界へ, Atarashī Sekai e)
- 1979 – Goin' Home
- 1981 – Tamashī (魂; lit. 'Soul')
- 1982 – Reggae Vibration – credited to Joe Yamanaka & The Wailers
- 1983 – Reggae Vibration II - My Reggae Music
- 1984 – Reggae Vibration III - We Are Fighters
- 1991 – Love Is an Art
- 2006 – Mr. Rally – Stupid Philosopher
- 2009 – Reggae Vibration IV - Going Back to Jamaica

Compilation

- 1980 – Joe '70s
- 1986 – 20th Anniversary
- 1996 – 3 Octaves no Shōmei (3オクターブの証明; lit. 'Proof of 3 Octaves')
- 1999 – Reggae History: Joe Yamanaka Best Selection
- 2001 – W's
- 2005 – Ultimate Best! Joe Yamanaka (究極のベスト！ ジョー山中, Kyūkyoku no Besuto! Jō Yamanaka)
- 2008 – Joe Yamanaka no Sekai: Meisenshū (ジョー山中の世界 名選集)
- 2012 – Bamboo Grass

Live

- 1978 – Live at Nippon Budokan (武道館ライブ, Budōkan Raibu)

=== With Flower Travellin' Band ===
Cover of Japanesque with Akira Ito and Hideki Ishima

Studio

- 1970 – Anywhere
- 1971 – Satori
- 1972 – Made in Japan
- 1973 – Make Up
- 2008 – We Are Here

Compilation

- 1971 – Satori
- 1975 – The Times

Video

- 2008 – Resurrection

=== With Kuni Kawachi ===
- 1970 – Kirikyogen

=== With Akira Ito and Hideki Ishima ===
- 1984 – Japanesque

== Filmography ==
=== Film ===
Year	Title	Role	Notes
1964	Car Thieves	Tohoku-Ben	
1968	Blackmail Is My Life	Noguchi	
1969	Black Rose Mansion	George	
1969	Savage Wolf Pack	Taro	
1977	Proof of the Man	Johnny Hayward	
1978	Never Give Up	Himself	
1981	Tomorrow's Joe 2	Carlos Rivera (voice)	
1989	Zatoichi	Sukezaemon Kuruma	
1991	Door II: Tokyo Diary	Mamiya	
1993	Ulterior Motives	Himself	
2002	Deadly Outlaw: Rekka	Nobuhiro Hiraoka	
2003	Shin Karate Baka Ichidai: Kakutōsha		
2004	Izo	Butler	
