= Made in Japan (Flower Travellin' Band album) =

Studio album by Flower Travellin' Band
- Released: February 10, 1972
- Studio: Thunder Sound Studio (Toronto)
- Genre: Progressive rock; psychedelic rock
- Length: 34:59
- Label: Atlantic
- Producer: Yuya Uchida, Ikuzo Orita, Paul Hoffert

Flower Travellin' Band chronology
Satori (1971)	Made in Japan (1972)	Make Up (1973)

Made in Japan is the third album by Japanese rock band Flower Travellin' Band, released in 1972.

== Production ==
After meeting Lighthouse at the Expo '70 festival in Osaka, Flower Travellin' Band were invited to visit Canada. While there, the group recorded Made in Japan with Lighthouse keyboardist Paul Hoffert helping produce. Vocalist Joe Yamanaka later stated that the process was very easy, with everything flowing well.

Due to George Wada becoming ill with tuberculosis, Canadian drummer Paul DeLong plays on some tracks on this album. The lyrics were written by Yoko Nomura, the wife of the band's manager, who translated conversations she had with the group and their ideas into English. "Heaven and Hell" was written by Yamanaka in Japanese and she translated it. The song "Hiroshima" is a re-imagining of "Satori Part III" from their previous album Satori. The introductory first track is an advertisement for a concert at Stanley Park Stadium in Toronto by Flower Travellin' Band, Emerson, Lake & Palmer, Bob Seger and Teegarden & Van Winkle, with a clip of "Lucky Man" playing in the background.

"Hiroshima", "Heaven and Hell" and "Aw Give Me Air" were covered by Cult of Personality, 9, and punk band Pulling Teeth respectively, for the 2000 Flower Travellin' Band Tribute album.

== Reception ==
Professional ratings
Review scores
Source	Rating
Allmusic	3.5/5 stars

Musician and author Julian Cope included Made in Japan at number 18 on his list of the top 50 albums of Japanese rock, as found in his 2007 book Japrocksampler. He described the record as "proto-metal of the Amon Düül II variety, replete with acoustic Tony Iommisms and mucho Satanic raga", "Aw Give Me Air" as retaining the "proto-metal Devilish chord changes" of Satori but "more Asian than demonic", and "Heaven and Hell" as musically "pure Hendrix".

Both Mason Jones of Dusted magazine and Eduardo Rivadavia of Allmusic claimed that following Satori was a difficult task and that Made in Japan was "doomed to fall short of expectations," respectively. Both reviewers also cited the same three songs, "Kamikaze", "Hiroshima" and "Spasms", as the highlights and being on par with the band's best work. Although he felt it inconsistent, Rivadavia called the album "pretty darn good!" and gave it a 3.5 star rating out of 5.

== Track listing ==
All tracks are written by Hideki Ishima and Yoko Nomuro, except track 7, by Ishima, Nomuro and Joe Yamanaka.

Side A
No.	Title	Length
1.	"Introduction" (advertisement for a concert)	0:27
2.	"Unaware"	5:51
3.	"Aw Give Me Air"	3:20
4.	"Kamikaze"	4:16
5.	"Hiroshima"	5:13

Side B
No.	Title	Length
6.	"Spasms"	5:23
7.	"Heaven and Hell"	3:50
8.	"That's All"	6:39

== Personnel ==
Flower Travellin' Band

- Joe Yamanaka – vocals
- Hideki Ishima – guitar, sitar
- Jun Kozuki – bass
- Joji Wada – drums

Additional musicians

- Paul DeLong – drums

Production and design

- Yoko Nomura – lyrics
- Flower Travellin' Band – arrangement
- Ikuzo Orita – producer
- Paul Hoffert – producer
- Yuya Uchida – producer
- Gilbert Kong – mixing
- Kiyoshi Sunamori – artwork
- Yoshio Niwano – artwork
- David Ohashi – photography
- Toyo Nakamura – liner notes
- John & Yoko Nomura – supervision

== See also ==
- 1972 in Japanese music
