= Yūya Uchida =

Yūya Uchida may refer to:

- Yuya Uchida (singer) (1939–2019), Japanese singer and actor
- Yūya Uchida (voice actor) (born 1965), Japanese voice actor
