= Tatsuya Nōmi =

Japanese actor (1969-2017)

- 能見 達也
- Born: Takashi Nōmi (能見毅, Nōmi Takashi); 13 August 1969; Tokyo, Japan
- Died: 18 May 2017 (aged 47)
- Occupation: Actor
- Years active: 1989–2013
- Agent: Ohta Production
- Notable work: Tengensei Daigo/ShishiRanger in Gosei Sentai Dairanger

Tatsuya Nōmi (Japanese: 能見達也, Hepburn: Nōmi Tatsuya; 13 August 1969 – 18 May 2017) was a Japanese actor associated with Ohta Production. He is best known for playing Tengensei Daigo/ShishiRanger in Gosei Sentai Dairanger.

== Biography ==
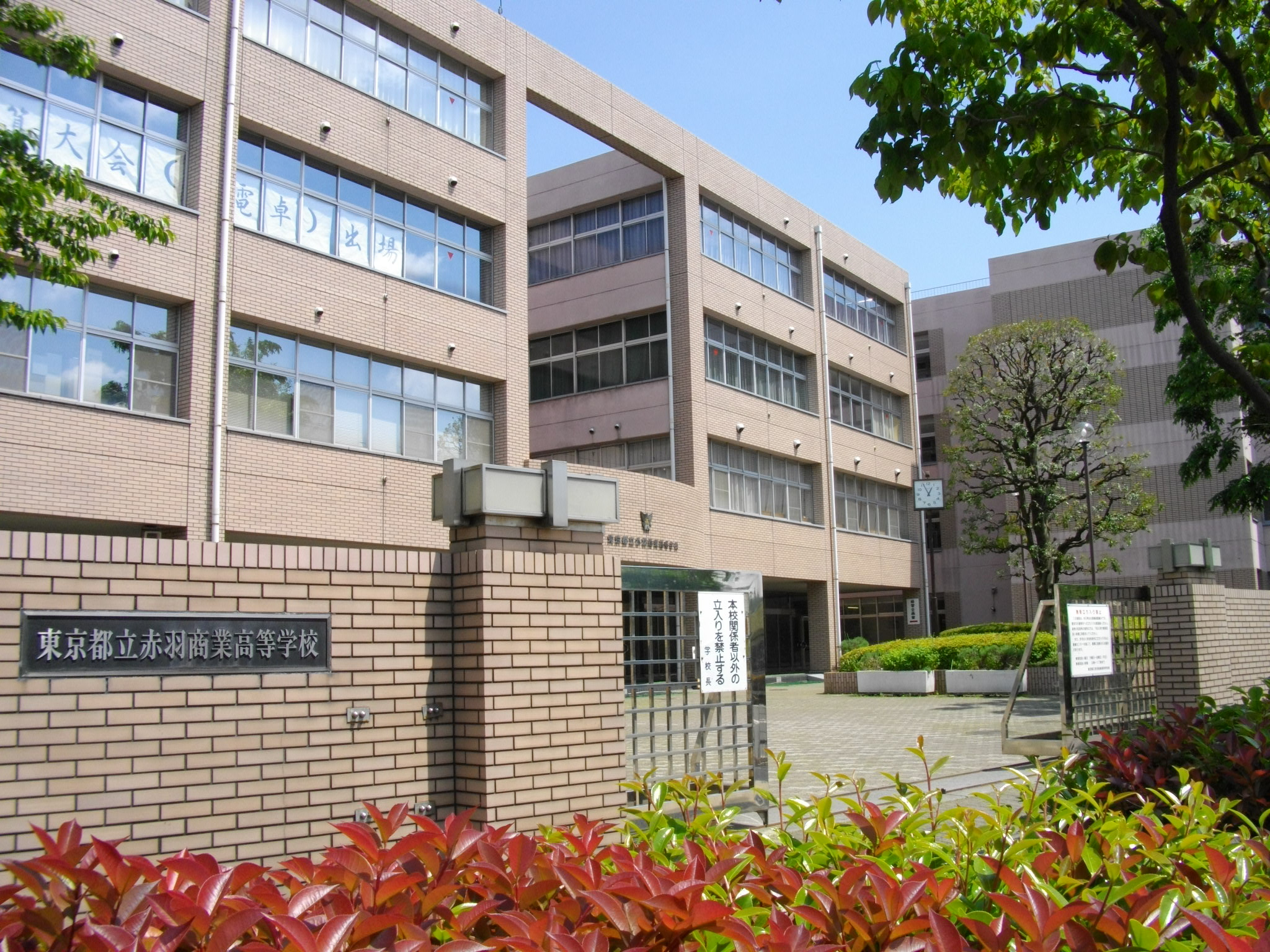
Akabane Commercial High School, the school Tatsuya Nōmi graduated from

Tatsuya Nōmi was born Takashi Nōmi (能見毅, Nōmi Takashi) in Tokyo on 13 August 1969, and he was a graduate of Akabane Commercial High School. In 1989, he joined the Tokyo Vaudeville Show, and his drama debut was in Dōkyūsei wa Shichihenge.

In tokusatsu, he played Tengensei Daigo/ShishiRanger in Gosei Sentai Dairanger, which aired from to , and he also appeared in episodes 42 and 51 of Ninpuu Sentai Hurricaneger, episode 37 of GoGo Sentai Boukenger, and episode 20 of Moero!! Robocon. His acting career also included the movie Izo and the taiga dramas Mōri Motonari and Tenchijin. On 30 September 2015, Nōmi announced that his contract with Ohta had expired.

Nōmi died in his home at the age of 47 on 18 May 2017. After the announcement, which was made to Sponichi Annex on 20 May by his elder brother Kōichi (孝一, Kōichi), condolences were expressed both by fans on social media and by Super Sentai alumni, including Dairanger co-stars Keiichi Wada (Tenkasei Ryō/RyūRanger), Ei Hamura (Tenjūsei Shōji/TenmaRanger), Hisashi Sakai (Kōshinsei Kō/KibaRanger), Keisuke Tsuchiya (Kazu/KirinRanger), and also Michiko Makino (who played Hikaru Katsuragi/Pink Five in Choudenshi Bioman), Ryōsuke Kaizu and Koichi Kusakari (who played Red Mask and Black Mask respectively in Hikari Sentai Maskman), Kenta Satō (who played Red Turbo in Kosoku Sentai Turboranger) Kōhei Yamamoto and Nao Nagasawa (who played HurricaneYellow and HurricaneBlue respectively in Ninpuu Sentai Hurricaneger), and Tetsu Inada (who voiced Doggie Kruger in Tokusou Sentai Dekaranger) Liberty Times in Taiwan also covered the story.

On 2 September 2017, Dairanger co-stars initiated a party to celebrate Nōmi at Nakano Sun Plaza.

== Filmography ==
1989

- Dōkyūsei wa Shichihenge

1990

- Roman Lenjitu (aired 22 March)
- Soredemo Boku wa Haha ni Naritai (aired 18 July)
- Yume Kigyō (episode 1)

1991

- New Wave Drama: Oto Shizuka no Umi ni Nemure (aired 23 June)
- Yo ni mo Kimyo na Monogatari: Channeling (aired 5 December)

1992

- Otona wa wakattekurenai (episode 10)
- Ohisashiburine!

1993-1994

- Gosei Sentai Dairanger - Daigo / ShishiRanger

1994

- Ari yo saraba (episode 4)
- Furuhata Ninzaburō
- Hagure Keiji Junjōha (aired 6 April)
- Heart ni S: X'Mas Special
- Kimi to ita Natsu (episodes 1 and 3)
- Ōedofūunden

1995

- Comedy Oedo de Gozaru
- Heart ni S (episode 4, aired 1 May)

1997

- Mōri Motonari
- Nandemoya Tanteichō
- Oishinbo (episode 4, aired 8 October)

1998

- Meitantei Yuri Rintarō: Chōchō Satsujin Jiken (5 December 1998)
- Naguru On'na (episode 7)
- News no On'na (uncredited)
- Souyakaikyō ni Kieta Satsujinsha (aired 19 December)
- WITH LOVE (episode 1)

1999

- Moero!! Robocon (episode 20)
- Shōshimin Kēn (episode 11)

2000

- All-Star Chūshingura Matsuri (aired 24 December)
- Densetsu no Kyōshi (episode 7)
- Shokatsu (episode 10)

2001

- Kabushiki Otoko (aired 5 April)
- Watashi o Ryokan ni Tsuretette (episode 2)

2002-2003

- Ninpuu Sentai Hurricaneger (episodes 42 and 51) - Sanpei Hamada

2003

- Bengoshi: Asahi Takenosuke (episode 19, aired 20 May)
- Bijokayajū (episode 9)
- Honō no Keibi Taichō: Igarashi Morio (aired 16 August)
- Kansatsui Shinomiya Hazuki: Shitai wa Kataru (episode 3, aired 11 May)
- Moshichi no Jikenbo: Fushigi Shōji (episode 4)
- Natsuki Shizuko Suspense (aired 16 November)
- Omiya-san (season 2, episode 4)
- Tokumei Kakarichō Tadano Hitoshi (season 1, episode 4)

2004

- IZO
- Mother & Lover (episodes 1, 2, and 4)
- Muta Keijikan Jiken File (episode 31, aired 10 April)
- Tsugunai (aired 30 June)

2005

- Keiyaku Kekkon (episode 47)
- Kensatsukan Kisogawa (aired 24 April)
- Magari Kado no Kanojo (episode 6)

2006

- AIBOU: Tokyo Detective Duo (season 4, episode 7)
- GoGo Sentai Boukenger (episode 37) - Wakabayashi Manager
- Odoru! Oyabun Tantei (episode 2; aired 22 September)

2007

- Yūkan Club (episode 3)

2008

- Aiba Monogatari (aired 3 May)
- Five (aired 5 January)
- Je t'aime: Watashi wa kemono (episode 4)
- Myū no Anyo Papa ni Ageru (aired 30 August)
- Saitō-san (episode 6)

2009

- Aishiteru: Kaiyō (episodes 1 and 2)
- Gine: Sanfu Jinka no On'natachi (episode 3)
- Tenchijin (episodes 33 and 34)

2010

- Hanchō: Jinnanjo Azumihan (season 3, episode 12)

2011

- Deka Wanko (episode 6)
- Kansatsui: Shinomiya Hazuki: Shitai wa Kataru (aired 7 December) - Kudo Junichi
- Shiritsu Tantei: Shimosawa Yui (aired 22 July)
- Yo ni mo Kimyo na Monogatari: 2011-nen Aki no Kubetsuhen (aired 26 November)

2012

- Answer: Keishichō Kenshō Sōsa-kan (episode 4)
- Fukkō seyo! Gotō Shinpei to Taishin (aired 22 January)

2013

- Gyakuten Hōdō no On'na (episode 2, aired 23 March)
