= Kazuki Tomokawa =

Japanese folk musician (born 1950)

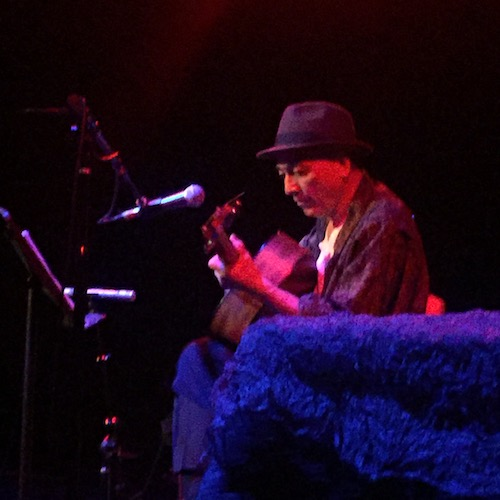
- Kazuki Tomokawa, performing at Bootleg Theater Los Angeles, November 2017

Background information
- Also known as: Tenji Nozoki
- Born: February 16, 1950 (age 76)
- Origin: Japan

Tenji Nozoki (及位典司; born February 16, 1950), best known by the stage name Kazuki Tomokawa (友川 かずき), is a prolific Japanese musician, active in the Japanese music scene since the early 1970s. His music has been used in the films of cult directors Takashi Miike and Kōji Wakamatsu, and he also appears in person in Miike's Izo (2004).

Japanese poet Satoru Nozoki is his brother.

== Discography ==
- Yatto Ichi Mai Me (English title: Finally First Album), 1975
- Nikusei (English title: Human Voice), 1976
- Senbazuru Wo Kuchini Kuwaeta Hibi, 1977
- Ore no Uchi de Nariyamanai Uta (English title: Poems That Won't Stop Crying From Within Me), 1978
- Inu - Tomokawa Kazuki Akita Konsaato Raibu (English title: Dog - Akita Concert Live), 1979
- Sakura No Kuni No Chiru Naka O' (English title: Within the Country of Falling Cherry Blossoms), 1980
- Umi shizuka, koe wa yami (English title: Sea Is Silent, Voice/Soul Is Suffering), 1981
- Muzan No Bi (English title: Beauty Without Mercy), 1986
- Hanabana no kashitsu (English title: Fault of Flowers), 1993
- Live Manda-La Special, 1994
- Maboroshi to asobu (English title: Playing with Phantoms), 1994
- Hitori Bon-Odori (English title: Dance A Bonodori Alone), 1995
- GO-EN: Live In Nihon Seinenkan, concert with Kan Mikami 1995
- Shibuya Apia Document, 1995 (Live)
- Zeiniku No Asa (English title: Fat in The Morning Light), 1996
- Hoshi no Process (English title: The Process of Stars), 1998 (Compilation)
- Yume Wa Hibi Genki Ni Shinde Yuku (English title: Dreams Die Blithefully Day By Day), 1998
- Sora no Sakana (English title: Sky Fish), 1999
- Akai Polyan (English title: Red Polyanthus), 2000
- Elise no me (English title: The Eyes of Elise), 2001
- Kenshin no Ichigeki (English title: A Blow By Kenshin), 2002
- Box, 2003, a boxset of Tomokawa's previous albums, including 3 bonus CDs of unreleased material (a compilation of his three first albums, Works of Chuya Nakahara and Satoru).
- Pistol - Shibuya Apia Live 2003 DVD, 2004
- Itsuka tooku o miteita, 2004 (Compilation with re-recorded and unreleased songs, including "Pistol", from Izo)
- Golden Best, 2004
- Satoru, 2005
- Live 2005 Osaka Banana Hall, 2005
- Nakahara Chuya Sakuhinnshu (English title: Works of Chuya Nakahara), 2006 (including the same tracks as on Ore no Uchide Nariymanai Uta, but with rearranged music)
- Blue Water, Red Water, 2008
- A Bumpkin's Empty Bravado, 2009
- Blue Ice Pick, 2010
- Vengeance Bourbon, 2014
- Gleaming Crayon, 2016
- Going to Buy Squid, 2024
