= We Are Here (Flower Travellin' Band album) =

Studio album by Flower Travellin' Band
- Released: September 17, 2008
- Recorded: May – June 2008
- Studio: Chlaet Studio, Ontario, Canada
- Genre: Acid rock
- Length: 50:15
- Label: Pony Canyon
- Producer: Ben Kobayashi

Flower Travellin' Band chronology
Make Up (1973)	We Are Here (2008)

We Are Here is the fifth and final album by Japanese rock band Flower Travellin' Band, released in September 2008 by Pony Canyon Records. It is their only album after reuniting in November 2007 and the only one to feature keyboardist Nobuhiko Shinohara as a full member. We Are Here peaked at number 299 on the Oricon chart.

== Production ==
Writing new material was one of the catalysts that brought about the group's reunion after 35 years, especially for Hideki Ishima. Ishima also remarked that even though Jun Kobayashi and George Wada had not played in years, they were eager and pushed him into doing it.

The album was recorded in Toronto, Ontario, Canada and produced by Jun's son Ben, with both Ishima and Joe Yamanaka stating that it was immediately as if they had never stopped playing together. When an interviewer suggested that their newer material was more positive than their darker, older music, Yamanaka said that although We Are Here still has the Oriental musical element of their 1970s work, it is in a more pop context.

== Track listing ==
All lyrics are written by Suzie Kim; all music is composed by Flower Travellin' Band.

No.	Title	Length
1.	"What Will You Say"	5:24
2.	"We Are Here"	5:25
3.	"dYE-jobe"	5:57
4.	"Don't Touch My Dreadlocks"	5:17
5.	"Love Is..."	9:12
6.	"Over & Over"	6:07
7.	"The Sleeping Giant (Resurrection)"	6:57
8.	"Will It"	5:56

== Personnel ==
=== The band ===
- Joe Yamanaka – vocals
- Hideki Ishima – sitarla
- Jun Kobayashi – bass
- George Wada – drums
- Nobuhiko Shinohara – keyboards

=== Technical staff ===
- Ben Kobayashi – producer
- Flower Travellin' Band – arranger
