= Anywhere (Flower Travellin' Band album) =

Studio album by Flower Travellin' Band
- Released: October 21, 1970
- Studio: Nippon Victor Studio
- Genres: Hard rock; heavy metal; psychedelic rock; progressive rock
- Length: 47:49
- Label: Philips
- Producers: Yuya Uchida; Tadataka Watanabe

Flower Travellin' Band chronology
Challenge! (1969)	Anywhere (1970)	Satori (1971)

Anywhere is a 1970 album by Japanese rock band Flower Travellin' Band. It was their first release under the Flower Travellin' Band name and the first to feature the classic line-up of Joe Yamanaka, Hideki Ishima, Jun Kozuki and Joji Wada.

== Overview ==
Following the release of Challenge!, Yuya Uchida dropped all the members of Yuya Uchida & The Flowers, except drummer Joji Wada, recruited guitarist Hideki Ishima, vocalist Joe Yamanaka and bassist Jun Kozuki, and formed the Flower Travellin' Band as a band that would appeal to international audiences.

Anywhere was made to emulate the band's previous release Challenge! by mainly consisting of cover songs and nude cover art, before releasing their first original album, Satori, shortly after. The cover was taken early in the morning at a former garbage dump in the seaside area that would later become Odaiba. It was used as the cover for Julian Cope's 2007 book Japrocksampler.

== Reception ==
Professional ratings
Review scores
Source	Rating
Allmusic	3/5 stars

Musician and author Julian Cope included Anywhere at number 28 on his list of the top 50 albums of Japanese rock, as found in his 2007 book Japrocksampler. He wrote that those who dismiss it as a covers album have never heard it, "For its grooves contain such monstrous modifications that each track leaves the starting block a full metre lower than the hoary jalopy originals." Cope explained that the band dissolve the 4/4 rhythm of "Black Sabbath" into an "ambient metal assault", while their version of "House of the Rising Sun" delivers "the proto-'Stairway to Heaven' shock-of-a-lifetime." Eduardo Rivadavia of AllMusic rated the album 3 out of 5 stars, describing the music as a "unique mixture of progressive daring, psychedelic eccentricity, and muscular, heavy rock austerity".

== Track listing ==
Side A
No.	Title	Length
1.	"Anywhere"	0:52
2.	"Louisiana Blues" (Muddy Waters cover)	15:49
3.	"Black Sabbath" (Black Sabbath cover)	8:53

Side B
No.	Title	Length
4.	"House of the Rising Sun" (The Animals cover)	7:41
5.	"21st Century Schizoid Man" (King Crimson cover)	13:25
6.	"Anywhere"	0:57

== Credits ==
- Joe Yamanaka – vocals, harmonica
- Hideki Ishima – guitar
- Jun Kozuki – bass
- Joji Wada – drums
- Tadataka Watanabe – producer
- Yuya Uchida – producer
- Norio Yoshizawa – engineer
- Tatsuo Umetsu – engineer
- Masaichiro Fukami – artwork
- Kishin Shinoyama – photography
- Makoto Saito – photography
