= Satori (Flower Travellin' Band album) =

Studio album by Flower Travellin' Band
- Released: April 5, 1971
- Recorded: 1970
- Genre: Heavy metal; progressive rock; psychedelic rock; hard rock
- Length: 42:14
- Label: Atlantic; GRT
- Producer: Yuya Uchida; Ikuzo Orita

Flower Travellin' Band chronology
| Anywhere (1970) | Satori (1971) | Made in Japan (1972) |

Satori is the second album by Japanese rock band Flower Travellin' Band, and their first of original material. It was released in Japan by Atlantic Records in 1971 and in the US and Canada by GRT Records.

== Production ==
Yuya Uchida formed the Flower Travellin' Band as a way to create a group with international appeal. At Expo '70, Canadian rock band Lighthouse saw Flower Travellin' Band perform, liked what they saw and suggested they go to Canada. Sensing the chance for international popularity, the group quickly recorded Satori to have something to bring with them.

Tired of covering Western blues bands, the Flower Travellin' Band wanted to create their own material. The members would get together and Hideki Ishima would come up with guitar riffs while everyone tried new ideas on each other. Because Ishima was interested in Indian music, the Oriental aspect became a part of the band's sound. Joe Yamanaka revealed that there are relatively few lyrics on the album because of the band's love for improvisation. He stated that because you can not suddenly change direction with lyrics as you can with instrumentation, he consciously stepped back and trusted the other musicians. The album was recorded in just two days; one day recording and one mixing.

== Release ==
The North American release differed from the Japanese original, as it contained songs from their then upcoming album Made in Japan and the bonus track "Lullaby".

The original Japanese version was reissued on CD by Warner Music in 1988. A re-release in 1991 contained the bonus track "Map", which was written by Kuni Kawachi and originally on his album Kirikyogen, which featured Joe Yamanaka and Hideki Ishima, under the name "Works Composed Mainly By Humans". This version of the song was previously released as a single by Flower Travellin' Band. The album was digitally remastered in 1998. In 2009 it was remastered on the new SHM-CD format.

== Reception ==
Professional ratings
Review scores
| Source | Rating |
|---|---|
| AllMusic | 4.5/5 stars |
| Collector's Guide to Heavy Metal | 7/10 |
| Sputnikmusic | 4.8/5 |

In September 2007, Rolling Stone Japan rated Satori #71 on their list of the "100 Greatest Japanese Rock Albums of All Time". Satori topped musician and author Julian Cope's top 50 albums of Japanese rock, as found in his 2007 book Japrocksampler. Calling it one of the all-time great "hard-rock rages to have been unleashed upon the world", he wrote that the album defies comparison with others. Cope described the record as a festival of guitar worship, where each "Satanic riff" is interlaced with "a more dazzling stellar lick", and so "regally exultant and wantonly barbaric simultaneously, yet so musically complete" that it renders vocalist Yamanaka all but obsolete.

David Fricke of Rolling Stone declared Satori his favorite Japanese rock album of all time and described Ishima's lead lines on it as having a "curdled-distortion quality, like mad-cat wails, that contrast dramatically with his Tony Iommi Jr. block-fuzz chords."

Hernan M. Campbell of Sputnikmusic said that Satori, with its traces of early heavy metal, progressive rock and psychedelia, captures "the eclecticism of the '70s rock scene, and all of the different philosophies that were steadily evolving into fully recognized genres." Giving the album a 4.8 rating out of 5, he also wrote that like Ishima and Yamanaka's previous work on Kuni Kawachi's album Kirikyogen, Satori has "the formidable and ominous sound that would become the essence of doom metal."

AllMusic's Thom Jurek gave the album 4½ stars out of 5 and made it their pick as the band's top album calling it "a real classic"; "From power chords to Eastern-tinged, North African, six-string freakouts, to crashing tom toms, to basses blasting into the red zone, Satori is a journey to the center of someplace that seems familiar but has never before been visited."

The Guardian's Rob Fitzpatrick stated that the album "blends edge-of-your-seat psychedelic shamanism with hair-shaking proto-metal rifferama".

== Legacy ==
"Satori Part III" was later re-imagined into Flower Travellin' Band's staple song "Hiroshima", on their next album Made in Japan. The entirety of Satori was used as the music score for Takashi Miike's 2002 film Deadly Outlaw: Rekka, which features Yuya Uchida and Joe Yamanaka as actors.

"Satori Part I" was covered by The Claypool Lennon Delirium, which consists of Les Claypool and Sean Lennon, for their 2017 EP Lime and Limpid Green. Lennon, whose mother Yoko Ono introduced him to the band's work and who knew the Flower Travellin' Band members, chose the song as a nod to his fellow Japanese, who he said had been suffering since the 2011 Tōhoku earthquake and tsunami. A sample from Satori is used prominently in Cypress Hill's 2018 single "Band of Gypsies".

"Satori Part I" was also covered by Iron Age on the b-side of their 2008 single "The Way Is Narrow." and by Bonesaw on their 2013 album "The Illicit Revue".

== Track listing ==
All tracks are written by Flower Travellin' Band

Side A
| No. | Title | Length |
|---|---|---|
| 1. | "Satori Part I" | 5:25 |
| 2. | "Satori Part II" | 7:06 |
| 3. | "Satori Part III" | 10:44 |

Side B
| No. | Title | Length |
|---|---|---|
| 4. | "Satori Part IV" | 11:01 |
| 5. | "Satori Part V" | 7:58 |

== Personnel ==
=== The band ===
- Joe Yamanaka – vocals
- Hideki Ishima – guitar
- Jun Kozuki – bass
- George Wada – drums

=== Technical staff ===
- Flower Travellin' Band – arranger
- Yuya Uchida – producer
- Ikuzo Orita – producer
- Norio Yoshizawa – mixing
- Shinobu Ishimaru – cover art
