= Satori (Flower Travellin' Band Canadian album) =

Studio album by Flower Travellin' Band
- Released: 1971
- Genre: Heavy metal; progressive rock; hard rock
- Label: GRT Records
- Producer: Paul Hoffert and Yuya Uchida

Satori is an album released by Flower Travellin' Band in Canada. It featured tracks from the original Japanese release of Satori, Made In Japan, and an additional track only available on the Canadian single release of Satori. The songs featured from Satori were remixed and edited considerably. The album was produced by Paul Hoffert of Lighthouse.

The album details are as follows:

== Track listing ==
=== Side one ===
1. "Satori Part I" (Hideki Ishima) 3:38
2. "Kamikaze" (Hideki Ishima, Yoko Nomura) 4:20
3. "Satori Part II" (Hideki Ishima) 3:37
4. "Hiroshima" (Hideki Ishima, Yoko Nomura) 5:15

=== Side two ===
1. "Unaware" (Hideki Ishima, Yoko Nomura) 5:55
2. "Gimme Air" (Hideki Ishima, Brenda Hoffert, Yoko Nomura) 3:15
3. "Satori Part III (actually Satori Part 5)" (Hideki Ishima) 4:00
4. "Lullaby" (Larry Green, Brenda Hoffert, Yoko Nomura) 2:35

=== Personnel ===
- Produced by Paul Hoffert and Yuya Uchida
- Photographs by Michaela Puthon
- Album design by Paul Weldon
- All selections published by Walden Music Inc, ASCAP
- Hideki Ishima - Guitar
- Shigeyuki Kobayashi - Bass
- Masami Wada - Drums
- Akira Yamanaka - Vocals

== Lullaby track ==
The track Lullaby was also recorded at this time, and was released on the Canadian version of the Satori album, as well as the b-side for the Canadian 45 rpm single for "Satori Part 2." (labelled Satori (Enlightenment), and running 3:32). It is a traditional Japanese sounding song, with sitar. The writing credits on the 45 are (L. Green, Y. Nomura, B. Hoffert), and the song's length is 2:44. The song is arranged by H. Ishima and produced by P. Hoffert.
