= Detective Story (2007 film) =

- Directed by: Takashi Miike
- Written by: Tsutomu Shirado
- Starring: Claude Maki; Kazuya Nakayama
- Cinematography: Kazunari Tanaka
- Edited by: Yasushi Shimamura
- Music by: Koji Endo
- Production companies: Maki Production; Mediaworks
- Distributed by: Mediaworks
- Release date: September 29, 2007
- Running time: 99 minutes
- Country: Japan
- Language: Japanese

Detective Story (Japanese: 探偵物語, Hepburn: Tantei monogatari) is a 2007 Japanese crime film directed by Takashi Miike.

== Plot ==
Takashima Raita, known as a brilliant hacker, moves into a low-rent apartment next door to Kazama Raita, a man with the same given name who works as a private detective. A girl named Inoue Manami comes looking for the detective late at night but finds him drunk and unwilling to help so they agree to meet the next morning. She is then murdered on her walk home afterwards. The next morning Kazama does not meet with the girl but rather police detectives who have traced her last known location to his apartment. Kazama takes it upon himself to investigate the girl's death.

A second girl, Asanuma Ritsuko, is murdered and the police stake out Kazama's apartment. He avoids them and investigates an affair she was having with a bartender. The police link a third victim to this series of murders because they have all had different organs removed from their bodies. Kazama remains a suspect. Kazama visits Gamou, a convicted child killer whose skin was burned off by the father of one of his victims, in order to get clues about the new killer. Kazama then tracks down Takashima and convinces him to use his hacking skills to help in the investigation. The police raid the building and both Raitas are forced to flee into the sewers. A janitor finds Kazama Raita's "Kazama Lighter" and the Raitas hide out with the bartender.

They become interested in an elderly artist named Aoyama Yuki who paints religious imagery and is known as the "Master of Tragedy" and the "Artist of Madness". His newer work is noticeably different because Aoyama has begun to paint with the blood and ground flesh of corpses. At a local bath Kazama asks a female friend to help him locate the artist.
Back at the bartender's home Kazama is attacked by an unknown assailant. Police lift his fingerprints from the lighter and he is put on the wanted list. Kazama shows up at Takashima's place of work and when the police arrive he pretends to take Takashima hostage with a box cutter in order to escape.

Kazama's friend finds Aoyama Yuki's house and speaks with his daughter Maho. She discovers that the three victims were all fans of the artist. After Yuki's wife committed suicide he moved in with his lover Seto Masami, a housekeeper. She calls Kazama with this information and theorizes that Yuki's wife Chie was driven mad by his extramarital affair, causing her to commit suicide. Shortly afterward Yuki had a daughter named Maho with an art student named Akimura Mizuho and Maho now lives in a foster home. She calls back and says that Yuki also had a son with Seto Masami named Masakuni. Kazama begins to put the pieces together and drives to the artist's studio in Izu for the final encounter with the artist's family.

== Cast ==
- Claude Maki as Takashima Raita
- Kazuya Nakayama as Kazama Raita

== Reception ==
Ben Sachs of Mubi called the film "satisfying as genre filmmaking. Many of the murder sequences are indeed scary—and they're scary because of their atmosphere and manipulation of suspense; they contain surprisingly little gore."
