= Gosei Sentai Dairanger =

Television series

- Genre: Tokusatsu; Superhero fiction Action-adventure; Fantasy
- Created by: Toei
- Developed by: Noboru Sugimura
- Directed by: Yoshiaki Kobayashi; Taro Sakamoto; Takeshi Ogasawara; Katsuya Watanabe
- Starring: Keiichi Wada; Tatsuya Nōmi; Ei Hamura; Keisuke Tsuchiya; Natsuki Takahashi; Hisashi Sakai; Koji Naka; Rintaro Nishi; Maroshi Tamura; Akiko Amamatsuri
- Narrated by: Hironori Miyata
- Opening theme: "Gosei Sentai Dairanger" Performed by New Jack Takurō
- Ending theme: "Ore-tachi Muteki sa!! Dairanger" Performed by New Jack Takurō
- Composer: Eiji Kawamura
- Country of origin: Japan
- Original language: Japanese
- No. of episodes: 50

Production
- Producers: Atsushi Kaji; Shinichiro Shirakura; Takeyuki Suzuki
- Production location: Tokyo, Japan (Greater Tokyo Area)
- Running time: approx. 25 minutes
- Production company: Toei

Original release
- Network: TV Asahi
- Release: February 19, 1993 – February 11, 1994

Related
- Kyōryū Sentai Zyuranger; Ninja Sentai Kakuranger

Gosei Sentai Dairanger (五星戦隊ダイレンジャー, Gosei Sentai Dairenjā; Five Stars Squadron Dairanger) (Note: "Dai" translates from "great".) is a Japanese television tokusatsu series broadcast by TV Asahi. The series is the 17th installment of Super Sentai. Directed by Yoshiaki Kobayashi, Taro Sakamoto, Takeshi Ogasawara and Katsuya Watanabe, it stars Keiichi Wada, Tatsuya Nōmi, Ei Hamura, Keisuke Tsuchiya, Natsuki Takahashi, Hisashi Sakai, Koji Naka, Rintaro Nishi, Maroshi Tamura and Akiko Amamatsuri. It aired from February 19, 1993 to February 11, 1994, replacing Kyōryū Sentai Zyuranger and was replaced by Ninja Sentai Kakuranger. Toei gave this series the name Star Rangers for international distribution.

Elements from Dairanger were adapted into the second season of Mighty Morphin Power Rangers, specifically the action sequences between the giant robots (which became the Power Rangers' Thunderzords) and some of the monsters. None of the Dairanger costumes were used in Power Rangers, except Kiba Ranger, which was adapted into the White Ranger's costume for Mighty Morphin Power Rangers for the remainder of Season 2 and throughout Season 3, while the suits from the previous season, Kyōryū Sentai Zyuranger were instead used for the other Rangers in that show (the end credits listed the show as titled Dai Rangers). Although the Aura Changer was adapted as the Magna Morpher in “Power Rangers Lost Galaxy”, the core Dairanger costumes in the footage were not used in Power Rangers until Power Rangers Super Megaforce.

In July 2015, Shout! Factory announced that they would release "Gosei Sentai Dairanger: The Complete Series" on DVD in North America. On November 10, 2015, Dairanger was released on DVD in North America. This is the second Super Sentai series to be released in North America. In addition on May 23, 2016, Shout! streamed the series on their website.

== Story ==
Eight thousand years ago, the Daos Empire (ダオス帝国, Daosu Teikoku), also known as the Daos Civilization (ダオス文明, Daosu Bunmei), flourished in Southern China. The empire consisted of three separate tribes: the Dai, the Shura (シュラ) (the ancestors of today's humanity) and the Gorma (the military tribe); which lived in harmony. However, one day, the Gorma Tribe decided to take over the Daos Empire and the world, beginning the war between the Gorma and Dai tribes. The war between the Gorma, led by the Gorma Triumvarate, and the Dai continued for 5,000 years until the Mythical Qi Beasts appeared to oppose the Gorma, whose qi (Note: "Qi" (simplified Chinese: 气; traditional Chinese: 氣; Korean: 기; Japanese: 気; Mongolian: хий; traditional Mongolian:ᠬᠡᠢ; Thai: ชี่; Lao: ຊີວິດ; Khmer: ឈី; Burmese: အသက်) is a concept in many East Asian and Southeast Asian cultures that relates to one's life force. It is pronounced as "ch'i" in Chinese, "khí" in Vietnamese, "gi" in Korean, "ki" in Japanese, "khii" in Mongolian, "chi" in Thai, "sivid" in Lao, "chhi" in Khmer, "aasaat" in Burmese, "gi" in Tagalog, "chi" in Malay, "chi" in Indonesian and "qi" in Tetum.) powers had increased to the point that they could turn themselves into monsters. Five Dai warriors' Qi-Powers had increased to the point where they could control the Mythical Qi Beasts. The war ended with the disappearance of both the Dai and Gorma tribes and the Shura scattered around the world. In the present day, the Gorma Tribe, one of the Daos' two missing branches, arose to take over the world. To counter them, Master Kaku assembled a team of five youths with high levels of qi, who became the Dairangers.

== Characters ==
=== Dairangers ===
The Dairangers (sans Kou) transformed. From left to right: Kazu, Rin, Ryo, Shoji, and Daigo.

The eponymous Dairangers are human practitioners of Chinese martial arts who possess high levels of Qi-Power (気力, Kiryoku) against the Gorma Tribe. As a group, the primary members perform the Qi-Power Bomber (気力ボンバー, Kiryoku Bonbā) finisher by gathering their qi and firing it towards the enemy. After their final battle, the Dairangers separated, with the last scene of the series showing them fifty years in the future in which their grandchildren follow the Dairangers' legacy and fight against the last remnants of the Gorma Tribe.

==== Ryo ====
Ryo of the Heavenly Fire Star (天火星・亮, Tenkasei Ryō) is the team leader who is the son of Choryo and a human woman. Initially, he was completely unaware of his Dai heritage as his mother died prior to the series' beginning leaving him to raise his younger sister, Yōko, by himself. He aspires to become the best gyoza cook in Japan and works in Yokohama Chinatown. Ryo became a Dairanger after he was captured by Baron String, only to be saved by the Mythical Qi Beast RyuseiOh and taken to Master Kaku. Ryo deeply trusts his teammates.

As the red-colored Ryu Ranger (リュウレンジャー, Ryū Renjā), (Note: "Ryu" is the Japanese translation for "dragon".) Ryo specializes in Dragon Kung Fu with the power to control fire and lightning. His signature move is the Heavenly Fire Star: Lightning Blaze Destruction Wave (天火星・稲妻炎上波, Tenkasei Inazuma Enjōha).

==== Daigo ====
Daigo of the Heavenly Illusion Star (天幻星・大五, Tengensei Daigo) is the second-in-command who is the gentlest and most serious member of the team. He works at a pet shop and becomes romantically involved with Kujaku. Daigo was recruited as a Dairanger after Kaku discovered his qi connection with Kujaku.

As the green-colored Shishi Ranger (シシレンジャー, Shishi Renjā), (Note: "Shishi" is the Japanese translation for "lion".) Daigo specializes in Hung Ga Kuen with the power to cast illusions. His signature move is the Heavenly Phantom Star: Mist Concealment (天幻星・霧隠れ, Tengensei Kirigakure).

==== Shoji ====
Shoji of the Heavenly Gravity Star (天重星・将児, Tenjūsei Shōji) is a former delinquent who dreams of becoming a world boxing champion after reforming from his past as a member of a violent street gang. He has a strong sense of fair play and competitiveness, only applicable with Kazu. He is strong, balanced, playful and loving. Boss Kamikaze, of the Three Gorma Stooges, sees him as his greatest rival.

As the blue-colored Tenma Ranger (テンマレンジャー, Tenma Renjā), (Note: "Tenma" is the Japanese translation for "Tianma" and "Pegasus".) Shoji specializes in Chang Quan with the power to manipulate gravitational forces around him to increase his strength and speed. His signature move is the Heavenly Gravity Star: Inversion Wave (天重星・重力逆転波, Tenjūsei Jūryoku Gyakutenha).

==== Kazu ====
Kazu of the Heavenly Time Star (天時星・知, Tenjisei Kazu) is a stylish beautician and dancer. He left home at the age of 15 and traveled to Tokyo. He has a tendency to go rushing into battle without thinking. He helped an old lady who sheltered him when he ran away from his home.

As the yellow-colored Kirin Ranger (キリンレンジャー, Kirin Renjā), (Note: "Kirin" is the Japanese translation for "qilin" and "giraffe".) Kazu specializes in Drunken Boxing with the power to freeze and reverse the flow of time to prevent mishaps. His signature move is the Heavenly Time Star: Time Reversal (天時星・時間返し, Tenjisei Jikan Gaeshi).

==== Rin ====
Rin of the Heavenly Wind Star (天風星・リン, Tenpūsei Rin) is Master Kaku's niece and the only member of the team capable of qi control when not transformed. She came to Japan to be a Dairanger in the guise of an exchange student from China. She hates living with Kou, as he tends to dab in front of her, but later befriends him. She once fell in love with photographer Shōichiro Takamura, the alter ego of Gorma agent Media Magician (メディア魔術師, Media Majutsushi).

As the pink-colored Houou Ranger (ホウオウレンジャー, Hōō Renjā), (Note: "Houou" is the Japanese translation for "fenghuang".) Rin specializes in Ying Zhao Pai with the power to control wind. Her signature move is the Heavenly Wind Star: Straight Line Tornado (天風星・一文字竜巻, Tenpūsei Ichimonji Tatsumaki).

==== Kou ====
Kou of the Howling New Star (吼新星・コウ, Kōshinsei Kō) is a 10-year-old boy who is the "Child of Fate" for drawing the sentient Byakko Shinken (白虎真剣; White Tiger True Sword) from his resting place, becoming the adult-like, white-colored Kiba Ranger (キバレンジャー, Kiba Renjā). (Note: "Kiba" is the Japanese translation for "fang".) He lived with his adoptive grandparents prior to moving into Rin's apartment. A somewhat perverted boy, he is infatuated with Rin and "playfully" harasses her much to her chagrin. New to fighting, he is not particularly strong. Kou initially kept his identity a secret from the other Dairangers, with Byakko Shinken speaking in his stead to appear more grown up. After the other Dairangers learned of his identity, he began to speak on his own and joined the team. Shadam eventually learned Kou was his son and Akomaru's twin brother, although Kou himself was never aware of this. As a result of this knowledge, Shadam tried to recruit Kou into the Gorma on his tenth birthday, but his mother's baptism purified him of his Gorma lineage.

As Kiba Ranger, Kou specializes in the fictional White Tiger Fist style with the power to control sound. His signature move is the Howling New Star: Scattered Echo (吼新星・乱れやまびこ, Kōshinsei Midare Yamabiko).

=== Allies ===
==== Kaku ====
Originally a member of Gorma, Chief of Staff Kaku (嘉挧参謀長, Kaku-sanbōchō) formed the Dairangers to oppose Gorma; his human alias is Master Kaku (道士 嘉挧, Dōshi Kaku). But when Daizinryu returned to Earth, Kaku returned to the Gorma in his metallic red Cyclops-like armor and fought Shadam for the right to the throne to become the 16th Gorma Emperor and end the fighting, using the Tower of You-Power (妖力の塔, Yōryoku no Tō) and the Tower of Qi-Power (気力の塔, Kiryoku no Tō) as boosters. Once Gara and Zydos destroyed the towers, Kaku was defeated and mortally wounded in the battle against Shadam, and later died in the arms of the Dairangers. He later appeared in spirit form to the Dairangers and told them that Gorma must be thwarted rather than be destroyed.

==== Choryo ====
Iron Face Choryo (鉄面臂 張遼, Tetsumenpi Chōryō) was the previous Ryu Ranger who joined the Gorma and became immortal as a result. 20 years prior to the events of the series, he fell in love with a human who gave birth to his son Ryo and daughter Yoko (洋子, Yōko). After Yoko was born, Choryo was summoned back to the Gorma by his master, Archbishop Riju, to fight the Dairangers after the Triumvirate failed to do so, but stopped upon hearing his son is the new Ryu Ranger. Choryo eventually saw the error of his ways and turned on his master. During the ensuing fight, he received a fatal blow and collapsed. Dying in Ryo's arms, the four spirits of the other original Dairangers appeared to Choryo to tell him they forgave him. He then passed on the knowledge of DairenOh to the new Dairangers before he died.

Choryo is portrayed by Go Ibuki (伊吹 剛, Ibuki Gō).

==== Kujaku ====
Kujaku (クジャク; Peacock) is a follower of Mahamayuri Vidyaraja, the Peacock Wisdom Queen and a master of kenpo. A member of the Dai Tribe (ダイ族, Dai-zoku), she became the Peacock Wisdom Queen's follower to restore Gara by finding the Sacred Peacock's Tears (聖なる孔雀の涙, Seinaru Kujaku no Namida), an ancient artifact said to heal whoever drinks from it. Gara joined the Gorma and through deception, trapped Kujaku in Mirror Make-Up Artist, causing Kujaku to swear revenge, resulting in her losing her compassion and love during her 6,000 years of imprisonment. Kujaku was freed by Daigo and attempted to murder Gara in revenge for her imprisonment until Daigo's perseverance and a little girl's kindness caused her to have a change of heart. Kujaku then resumed looking for the Sacred Peacock's Tears, realizing that she was dying from the Earth's pollutants and evil. Unfortunately, Kujaku realized that she would sicken and die even if she drank the Sacred Peacock's Tears, causing her to use the artifact to restore Gara's beauty instead. Kujaku then died with the real Gara at her side. Kujaku would later reappear in spirit form to restore Daigo's faith and plead with him not to take revenge.

==== Guhon ====
Grandmaster Guhon (老道士 虞翻, Rōdōshi Guhon) is Rin's great-granduncle and Kaku's mentor, who tends to be bizarre at times and often cracks his neck. Despite his appearance, Guhon was the inventor of the Aura Changers and later provided the Dairangers with their Dairinken (大輪剣) blades and the Super Qi-Power Bazooka (スーパー気力バズーカ, Sūpā Kiryoku Bazūka). Prior to the Kabuki Boy incident, Guhon entrusted his fiancé Shokyo with Byakko Shinken which he placed within a stone until the rightful owner (Kou) could claim the weapon. Guhon later revealed to Kameo his true identity as Daimugen.

==== Shokyo ====
Shokyo (小喬, Shōkyō; 14) is Guhon's 29-year-old fiancé, a Chinese Opera writer whom he entrusted with Byakko Shinken. Her profession caught the eye of Kabuki Boy, who abducted her, although Guhon won her back. After returning Byakko Shinken to Guhon, Shokyo marries him as she returns to China.

Shokyo is portrayed by Aki Miyase (宮瀬 亜希, Miyase Aki).

==== Kou's mother ====
Kou's mother is married to Shadam and is a member of the Dai Tribe. She possessed a strong qi. She placed a tiger tattoo on Kou at birth to suppress his Gorma-inherited powers and had him adopted after his birth to prevent the Gorma from tracking him down. Kou's mother was taken captive by an elderly Gorma and Akōmaru. She escaped when Shadam broke into her prison to discover the source of Akōmaru's information. She later used Byakoshinken to save a wounded Kou and to purge the Gorma powers from him. She died in a cave collapse along with Akōmaru.

=== The Gorma Tribe ===
The Gorma Tribe (ゴーマ族, Gōma-zoku) are the antagonists of the series. Eight thousand years ago they were the military of the three tribes but decided to take the world for themselves and destroy the other two. The Gorma are humans who have mastered You-Power (妖力, Yōryoku) and gained the ability to become monsters. Their leader is the Gorma Emperor with many other divisions under him. However, it was revealed that most of the higher aristocracy had been killed centuries before the series even began. It was thought that Shadam had secretly made clay versions of them all in a bid to be emperor himself. However, as he himself turned out to be clay, it's debatable who created the clay copies. While the You Power the Gorma uses gives them great power, it also has damaged their mental stability, as the most powerful Gorma are almost completely insane as seen with the Gorma Emperor and those before him due to the Earth Shaking Jewel (大地動転の玉, Daichi Dōten no Tama)

==== Gorma XV ====
Gorma XV (ゴーマ十五世, Gōma Jū-go-sei) is the fifteenth Emperor of Gorma who mysteriously resurfaced to reopen the Gorma Palace (ゴーマ宮, Gōma-kyū) with intent to restore his crumbling empire to its former glory. He is an extremely powerful entity, though a bit insane. The insanity was an inherent aspect of all the Gorma's past fourteen emperors due to the power of the Earth Shaking Jewel which supplies the Emperor with an unlimited supply of "You Power" for him to live, though only few actually know the truth. The Emperor was more of a sadistic, heartless creature with a "playful" outlook on things. However, the Emperor got more serious when he saw Shadam's intention to overthrow him. He was hoping for Shadam to fall to their enemies so he can rule the world forever. But when Shadam became next in line and demanded the Earth Shaking Jewel, the Emperor refuses and attempts to use the jewel to kill Shadam himself. However, The Emperor's own conceit was a flaw as Shadam revealed he recreated the Emperor from clay, only letting him live until Shadam became Emperor himself and Gorma's official leader. With that revelation, Shadam managed to steal the Earth Shaking Jewel while the former Emperor is reduced to clay dust.

==== Gorma Triumvirate ====
The Gorma Triumvirate (ゴーマ3幹部, Gōma San Kanbu), who are part of the Military Level (Kaku also belongs to this level), help spear head the Gorma's attack on humans. In episode 30, they get to wield the spiritual powers of Hell.

===== Shadam =====
Commander Shadam (シャダム中佐, Shadamu-chūsa) is the leader of the Gorma Triumvirate and the real father of Akomaru and Kou. He was also the one who spearheaded the Gorma attack against the Dai Tribe in China. He hates humans for their weaknesses and can assume a fighting form, with a mask that practically covers his face. Shadam's motivation in Gorma was to reach higher rankings until he became the 16th Gorma Emperor, deposing the competition in any way possible. He eventually realized his dream and the power of the Gorma Emperor once he defeated Kaku and disposed the previous once he is resurrected so he can become his successor. As Gorma XVI (ゴーマ十六世, Gōma Jū-roku-sei), he intended to use the Earth Shaking Jewel to take over the world despite suffering its mind-warping effects, fighting the Dairangers. But when Daizinryu appears, the Earth Shaking Jewel left Shadam to appease Daizinryu's wrath. A maddened Shadam attempted to escape, only to be encountered by Ryo in a one-way knife duel between them. Shadam lost and died on his own knife, revealing that he was actually a clay figure made long ago. As his body crumbled to dust, only an electricity-vibrating human eyeball remained among the pile of dirt. Shadam was revealed to have been responsible for making clay copies of the Gorma higher ranks, as most of them died years ago but since Shadam too was a clay copy, it is not known what happened to the real Shadam and who created the copies.

===== Gara =====
Commander Gara (ガラ中佐, Gara-chūsa) is the female member of the Gorma Triumvirate, though she was actually a clay copy of the original Gara and a former member of the Dai Tribe who joined Gorma at age 10 when she believed that her friend Kujaku abandoned her after she was scarred in the face while protecting her, getting revenge with Mirror-Makeup Artist's aid. When Gara died soon after, Shadam created the one that the Dairangers would face in the present time, identical to the original in every way. She created a copy of herself called Wraith Gara (生き霊ガラ, Ikiryō Gara) for a short time by dripping her own blood onto a small doll made of straw. During the final battle, Gara learned the truth of her existence as the "Real Gara" appeared and used her power to reduce Gara into dust.

===== Zydos =====
Lieutenant Commander Zydos (ザイドス少佐, Zaidosu-shōsa) is the strongman, brutal and prone to deep thinking. He was a key player amongst the Gorma because of his power and he could create extremely dangerous new Gorma like Jin. He believed utterly in Shadam as his leader, but was also prone to doing his own things. He has trouble controlling the 3 Gorma Idiots as they tend to botch the plans due to their competitive nature. He was nearly killed by Jukou Kiden, but he survived. During the match between Shadam and Kaku, Zydos was sent to destroy the power booster Kaku intended to use in the match. Though he barely survived Jukou Kiden for the second time, Zydos died when he turned into his true form: a clay figure created by Shadam as he remembered him.

==== Senate Level ====
The highest level next to the Emperor. The following belong to this level

- The Archbishop Riju/Archbishop Saw (大僧正リジュ/ノコギリ大僧正, Daisōjō Riju/Nokogiri Daisōjō; 7 & 8) was an insane saw-themed Gorma of higher rank than the Gorma Triumvirate, and Choryo's master. After his pupil failed to kill the Dairangers, Riju took matters to his own hands. He would have succeeded had Choryo not attacked him when he was attacking Ryo. First to be killed by DairenOh.
- General Denpou (田豊将軍, Denpō-shōgun; 17–48) is second-in-command to the Emperor and Akomaru's teacher/guardian. He was killed by Shadam when Denpou saw what he was doing to a resting Gorma XV and noticed the clay hand that exposed the Emperor as a clay copy.

==== Other Gorma Tribe members ====
- Akomaru (阿古丸) is a Gorma child who is the son of Shadam, though the two despise each other fiercely. Shadam apparently had Akomaru put up for adoption when he was born, and was now under General Denpou's wing. In fact, Akomaru is ranked higher than his father. He wants to replace his father as the Gorma military leader. He first appears to take the power of the Kiba Ranger, knowing Kou has it and aware of their relation and wanted Kou to fight by his side as brothers. Unfortunately, Akomaru saw that Kou seemed unable to hate and it annoyed him. Akomaru was killed when he was crushed by a boulder, with Kou at his side. Later the Gorma Emperor brought Akomaru back from Hell prior to his tenth birthday, when he, after having absorbed Hell's Spirit Power which made him more powerful, and Kou came into their adult power as Gorma, Akomaru using his powers to manipulate Kou in his dreams. Akomaru was made to believe that his mother abandoned him to a father who never cared about him. After losing Kou's mother to the Dairanger, Gorma XV banished Akomaru from the Gorma. Akomaru gave the Dairangers quite a battle when he rode atop his bodyguard Ikazuchi, via "You-Power Fusion". After Ikazuchi died, Akomaru learned the truth that his mother abandoned him because of a taboo that one twin must be killed so the other can have the power of both. So their mother decided to save them, with Akomaru to live as a Gorma and Kou as a normal human. But Akomaru was soon mortally injured by Shadam, limping into the cave collapsing on itself and dying in the embrace of his dying mother with the knowledge that he was loved.
- The Three Court Ladies of Hell (地獄の三人官女, Jigoku no San-nin Kanjo; 17-22) are three sisters who served as Akomaru's bodyguards/nannies, mistress of the 3-as-1 fighting style. They were sent to try to prevent Kiba Ranger being born and later to track him down as part of Akomaru's scheme of drafting him.
  - Court Lady Earring (イヤリング官女, Iyaringu Kanjo; 17 & 18): The youngest sister with big ears in her monster form, she is able to shoot her hair to grab opponents in a constrictor hold. Mortally wounded by Kiba Ranger after she found out his true identity, she died from massive bloodloss before she could tell Akomaru. Court Lady Earring is voiced by Yukari Nakayama (中山 由香里, Nakayama Yukari), who also portrays her human form.
  - Court Lady Necklace (ネックレス官女, Nekkuresu Kanjo; 17-20): The middle sister, she is able to extend her neck to great lengths & possesses telescopic vision in her third eye while in her monster form. She disguised herself as the abusing and indifferent mother of Akomaru's "Kasumi guise". She is killed by DairenOh. Court Lady Necklace is voiced by Yuka Arai (荒井 ゆか, Arai Yuka), who also portrays her human form.
  - Court Lady Ring (指輪官女, Yubiwa Kanjo; 17-22): The eldest sister with a hand-themed form, she was able to create energy rings to lasso her opponents. After her two sisters died, Lady Ring vowed to avenge them. Using their possessions, Lady Ring could create "phantom" versions of her sisters to fight with her. Using this ability she easily defeated Won Tiger, but later became first to be killed by Kibadaioh. Court Lady Ring is voiced by Rumi Watanabe (渡辺 るみ, Watanabe Rumi), who also portrays her human form.
- Ikazuchi (イカヅチ; Thunderbolt; 42-44) is Akomaru's demon/insectoid bodyguard, this monster fought the Kiba Ranger-less Dairangers. He obtained his name from the fact that he can fire lightning from parts of his body, powerful enough to attract Daizinryu and the Gorma-infested Kiba Ranger's attention. He was winning until Kiba Ranger was purified and rejoined the team, thus killing Ikazuchi with Jukou Kiden.
- The Gorma Four Heavenly Kings (ゴーマ四天王, Gōma Shiten'nō; 20 & 28-31) are the most favored of the Gorma Emperor's minions; East Heaven (東方天, Tōhōten), South Heaven (南方天, Nanpōten), West Heaven (西方天, Saihōten), and North Heaven (北方天, Hoppōten); wearing the attire of Buddhist Priests and being masters of displacement. They attempted to use their illusions to trap the Dairangers with key figures (Kujaku, Jin, Three Gorma Stooges, and Akomaru) individually. Their teamwork skills were their greatest power, as they could merge into one deadly four-headed Deva entity called Combined Four Heavenly Kings (合体四天王, Gattai Shiten'nō). They survived the attack of Kibadaioh twice, but were soon the first to be killed by Jukou Kiden. East Heaven, South Heaven, West Heaven, and North Heaven are portrayed by Yoshinori Okamoto (岡本 美登, Okamoto Yoshinori), Hideaki Kusaka (日下 秀昭, Kusaka Hideaki), Daigaku Sekine (関根 大学, Sekine Daigaku), and Kiyokazu Inoue (井上 清和, Inoue Kiyokazu), respectively.
- Jin Matoba (的場 陣, Matoba Jin) is a master of dark karate known as Panther Fang Style Wicked Heart Fist (豹牙流邪心拳, Hyōga-ryū Jashin-ken) and all manner of martial arts, and was a gentleman assassin. His favorite targets were martial arts masters as his own master cut off his left arm. Jin got a prosthesis, perfected his arts and went on a campaign to slaughter other masters who were too hard on their students to return and kill his first teacher. His trademark was to flip a coin into the air and kill his opponent before it landed. But the man foiled that plan by dying before Jin got around to it. But that all changed the day he met Ryo and was defeated by him. Later, Jin sold his soul to Zydos to become stronger than Ryo, becoming Demon-Fist Master Jin (魔拳士ジン, Makenshi Jin) after punching Aki (亜紀), a young nurse who was the only person who cared for him. But Jin refused to be Gorma's lapdog and perfected his new-found powers on his own, after which he went hunting for Ryo. But Zydos captured the rogue and infused him with more Gorma power, turning him into the skeletal wolf-themed Garouki (餓狼鬼, Garōki; Hungry-Wolf Demon). Unlike the normally born Gorma, Jin's transformation was against his will and thus he was unable to control himself as Garouki. As Garouki, Jin is like a totally obedient dog for Zydos with a desire to kill and eat his victims. Jin was soon freed of his "Gorma-incarnation" thanks to Ryo's attack separating the monster from his body. While Jin fought Zydos, with Garouki destroyed by the Qi-Power Bazooka, he was mortally wounded. After one final bout with Ryo, Jin went on the run from the Gorma. Jin was last seen fighting the bulk of an entire army of Cotpotoros led by Zydos, only to be seemingly gunned down by the second wave. But Jin later appeared to Ryo and proceeded to beat sense into him for not giving up despite no longer being a Dairanger.
- The Three Gorma Stooges (ゴーマ3ちゃんズ, Gōma San-chanzu; 15, 24, 40, 47 & 48) are three Gorma in the service of Zydos, though their foolishness deemed them at lower ranks; they all have a sense of competition and honor. Furthermore, to make them less respectable, none of them can assume human form like their fellow Gorma. They were beaten by RyuseiOh the first time and Kibadaioh the second time. Though they survived both fights, the trio ended up being bandaged up. Over the course of the series, they would gain respect for the Dairangers (and vice versa); specifically for Shoji, who was seen as the most competitive of the Dairangers. After all that happened to them, they managed to survive the entire series after being blown up various times. Deep down, they never wanted to kill the Dairangers, just defeat them in contests and sports. They would finally settle things with the Dairangers in a bike race, though they made their peace with the Dairangers using the minefield Zydos placed on the finish line to fake their deaths. The trio later returned to help Shoji.
  - General Kamikaze (神風大将, Kamikaze Taishō): The motorcycle-themed leader of the group who rides a motorcycle. He tends to use "baby" in his sentences.
  - President Gravestone (墓石社長, Hakaishi Shachō): The tombstone-themed/right-hand man of the group; he can open his head to reveal a variety of things.
  - Master Telephone (電話先生, Denwa Sensei): Kamikaze's telephone-themed "girl", able to control any phone to spy on people or attack from long distances.
- The Cotpotoros (コットポトロ, Kottopotoro) are bartender-themed Gorma grunts in black tuxedo tights with lipped but otherwise blank black and white faces. They would disguise as humans and serve virtually any Gorma, including the Three Gorma Stooges, serving as players in their various games. In the finale, the Dairangers faced red-dressed Cotpotoros in the palace. The group were later summoned by Zaigan during Super Sentai World.

==== Gorma Minions ====
The Gorma Minions are the monsters that are used by the Gorma Tribe.

===== Zydos' Gorma Minions =====
Besides the Three Gorma Stooges, the following Gorma Minions work for Zydos:

- Purse Priest (ガマグチ法師, Gamaguchi Hōshi; 2) is a purse-themed monster who appeared in the form of a tall basketball player.
- Sergeant Cannon (大筒軍曹, Ōzutsu Gunsō; 35) is a cannon-themed monster.

===== Gara's Gorma Minions =====
The following Gorma Minions work for Gara:

- Lipstick Songstress (口紅歌姫, Kuchibeni Utahime; 5, 6, Movie) is a vain lipstick-themed monster.
- Mirror Make-Up Artist (鏡化粧師, Kagami Keshōshi; 9, 10) is a mirror-themed monster.
- Sakura Viscount (サクラ子爵, Sakura Shishaku; 10) is a one-eyed cherry blossom-themed monster.
- Father Magnet (磁石神父, Jishaku Shinpu; 11) is a magnet-themed monster who posed as a man of the clothe.
- Haniwa Ventriloquist (ハニワ腹話術師, Haniwa Fukuwajutsushi; 16) is a Haniwa-themed monster.
- Heatwave Hood (陽炎頭巾, Kagerō Zukin; 23) is a very powerful Chinese warrior/potbelly stove-themed monster.
- Copy Empress (コピー女帝, Kopī Jotei; 25) is a photocopier-themed monster who posed as a publicist.
- Media Magician (メディア魔術師, Media Majutsushi; 33) is a camera-themed monster who posed as a photographer named Shoichiro Takamura (高村翔一郎, Takamura Shōichirō).
- General Cactus (サボテン将軍, Saboten Shōgun; 34) is a cactus-themed monster.
- Count Kaleidoscope (万華鏡伯爵, Mangekyō Hakushaku; 36) is a kaleidoscope-themed monster.

===== Shadam's Gorma Minions =====
The following Gorma Minions work for Shadam:

- Pot Taoist (壷道人, Tsubo Dōjin; 26, 27) is a pottery-themed monster.
- Fast-Talking Wanderer (早口旅ガラス, Hayakuchi Tabigarasu; 29, 30) is a microphone-themed monster who posed as a very strange man in a funky hat.
- Pachinko Master (パチンコ大名人, Pachinko Daimeijin; 37, 38) is a pachinko-themed monster. Crushed to death by Daizynryu.

===== Other Gorma Minions =====
The following do not work for any of the above:

- Baron String (紐男爵, Himo Danshaku; 1, 2, Movie) is a knotted string-themed monster who posed as a young boy.
- Key Jester (鍵道化師, Kagi Dōkeshi; 3, 4, Movie) is a key-themed monster who posed as the Black Jester.
- Duke of Trump (トランプ公爵, Toranpu Kōshaku; Movie) is a playing card deck/magician hat-themed monster. He revived Baron String, Purse Priest, Key Jester, Lipstick Songstress where he later combined with them to form Great King Ojaru (オジャル大王, Ojaru Daio) who has Key Jester's sword for a left arm, Lipstick Songstress' sword coming out of the Purse Priest-headed right hand, and Baron String's tentacles on its torso.
- Tofu Hermit (豆腐仙人, Tōfu Sen'nin; 12) is a tofu-themed monster with trumpet-like structures coming out of his head
- Kabuki Novice (歌舞伎小僧, Kabuki Kozō; 13, 14) is a Kabuki-themed monster with a true form and a robotic form.
- Birdcage Vagrant (鳥カゴ風来坊, Torikago Fūraibō; 32) is a birdcage-themed monster who sported a peg-leg after the golden leg that made him invincible was stolen by Master Kaku.
- New Gorma Monster (新ゴーマ怪人, Shin Gōma Kaijin; 50) is a knotted string monster that appeared in the epilogue. He is a rebuilt, recolored, and altered version of Baron String.

=== Daizinryu ===
Daizinryu (大神龍, Daijinryū; Great God Dragon) is a colossal godlike entity who preserves the natural balance of the world, referred to as the "Great King of Fear that will destroy the Earth" by Kameo/Daimugen. He appears whenever battles have gone too far, like the ones between the Dairangers and the Gorma. Daizinryu is a neutral being, but has no tolerance for whoever threatens to disrupt the natural order of things. Daizinryu arrived on the planet in Rising Dragon Mode (昇竜モード, Shōryū Mōdo), only to transform into the bipedal Dragon God Mode (竜神モード, Ryūjin Mōdo), his feet as big as Daimugen's shell.

He is also capable of firing lightning bolts with immense destructive power. During his first appearance, he attacks Great Famous Pachinko Player (パチンコ大名人, Pachinko Daimeijin) and RyuseiOh. The universe's will that he obeyed told him that the two warring factions had to agree a cease-fire, so Daizinryu would spare the lives of everyone on Earth and the planet itself, but he gave a warning to both the Dairangers and the Gorma not to incur his wrath by destroying most of Tokyo. The annoyed dragon crushed Pachinko Master to death under his massive foot, then turned and disassembled DairenOh with a lightning bolt. He then attempted to crush RyuseiOh (the only Mythical Qi Beast left standing). RyuseiOh was saved by Daimugen, who hid RyuseiOh inside of his shell, but was nearly crushed by Daizinryu. Daizinryu let them live because of the universe's will and the truce between the Dairangers and the Gorma.

When the Dairangers dealt with Ikazuchi, Daizinryu seemingly put many civilians in Tokyo under his control, lining them up on top of buildings to fall to their deaths, before Kaku counter-acted the spell. Daizinryu made his final appearance to destroy the Gorma Palace, seeing that Shadam and the Gorma were the cause of all the trouble. To calm him down, the Lailai Balls and the Great Earth Shaking Jewel scattered to the four winds on their own will.

== Episodes ==
No.	Title	Directed by	Written by	Original release date
1	"Let's Transform"; Transliteration: "Tenshin Daā" (Japanese: 転身だァァッ)	Yoshiaki Kobayashi	Noboru Sugimura	February 19, 1993
2	"It's Qi-Power!!"; Transliteration: "Kiryoku Daā!!" (Japanese: 気力だァァッ!!)	Yoshiaki Kobayashi	Noboru Sugimura	February 26, 1993
3	"Your Souls, Please!"; Transliteration: "Tamashii Chōdai!" (Japanese: 魂ちょうだい！)	Taro Sakamoto	Noboru Sugimura	March 5, 1993
4	"We're Naive!!"; Transliteration: "Ore-tachi Amai ze!!" (Japanese: 俺たち甘いぜ!!)	Taro Sakamoto	Noboru Sugimura	March 12, 1993
5	"The Jewels Have Come"; Transliteration: "A Tama Kita" (Japanese: あっタマきたッ)	Takeshi Ogasawara	Naruhisa Arakawa	March 26, 1993
6	"Wind Cut Through"; Transliteration: "Kaze yo Butchigire" (Japanese: 風よブッちぎれ)	Takeshi Ogasawara	Naruhisa Arakawa	April 2, 1993
7	"Traitor!"; Transliteration: "Uragirimonō!" (Japanese: 裏切り者ォッ！)	Katsuya Watanabe	Noboru Sugimura	April 9, 1993
8	"Father!!"; Transliteration: "Oyajiī!!" (Japanese: おやじぃぃッ!!)	Katsuya Watanabe	Noboru Sugimura	April 16, 1993
9	"Don't be Vain"; Transliteration: "Unuboreru na" (Japanese: うぬぼれるなッ)	Taro Sakamoto	Kunio Fujii	April 23, 1993
10	"Ah, the Vengeful Goddess"; Transliteration: "Aa Fukushū no Megami" (Japanese: あァ復讐の女神)	Taro Sakamoto	Kunio Fujii	April 30, 1993
11	"Gauss With a Magnet!"; Transliteration: "Jishaku de Gausu!" (Japanese: 磁石でガウス！)	Takeshi Ogasawara	Naruhisa Arakawa	May 7, 1993
12	"Drunk on Tofu"; Transliteration: "Tōfu de Yottaa" (Japanese: 豆腐で酔ったァ)	Takeshi Ogasawara	Susumu Takaku	May 14, 1993
13	"The Ka-Kabuki Novice"; Transliteration: "Ka Kabuki Kozō" (Japanese: カッ カブキ小僧)	Shohei Tojo	Noboru Sugimura	May 21, 1993
14	"Well, a Wedding"; Transliteration: "Iyo Kekkon ja" (Japanese: イヨッ 結婚ぢゃ)	Shohei Tojo	Noboru Sugimura	May 28, 1993
15	"The 3 Stooges' Soccer"; Transliteration: "San Baka Sakkā" (Japanese: 3バカサッカー)	Taro Sakamoto	Naruhisa Arakawa	June 4, 1993
16	"Rumbling Child Stones"; Transliteration: "Gorogoro Kodomo Ishi" (Japanese: ゴロゴロ子供石)	Taro Sakamoto	Kunio Fujii	June 11, 1993
17	"He's Here, a New Hero"; Transliteration: "Demashita Nyū Hīrō" (Japanese: 出ました新戦士(ニューヒーロー))	Katsuya Watanabe	Noboru Sugimura	June 18, 1993
18	"The Secret Byakko-chan"; Transliteration: "Himitsu no Byakko-chan" (Japanese: ㊙の白虎ちゃん)	Katsuya Watanabe	Noboru Sugimura	June 25, 1993
19	"The Heart-Throbbing Pretty Girl"; Transliteration: "Dokidoki Bishōjo" (Japanese: ドキドキ美少女)	Takeshi Ogasawara	Naruhisa Arakawa	July 2, 1993
20	"First Opening of the Gorma Palace"; Transliteration: "Hatsu Kōkai Gōma-kyū" (Japanese: 初公開ゴーマ宮)	Takeshi Ogasawara	Naruhisa Arakawa	July 9, 1993
21	"The Birth of a Mythical Qi Beast"; Transliteration: "Kidenjū-sama Gotanjō" (Japanese: 気伝獣様ご誕生)	Shohei Tojo	Noboru Sugimura	July 16, 1993
22	"The Great Secret Art of the Tiger Cub!!"; Transliteration: "Tora no Ko Dai Hijutsu!!" (Japanese: 虎の子大秘術!!)	Shohei Tojo	Noboru Sugimura	July 23, 1993
23	"True Love at Full Speed"; Transliteration: "Jun'ai Masshigura" (Japanese: 純愛まっしぐら)	Taro Sakamoto	Kunio Fujii	July 30, 1993
24	"The 3 Stooges' Super Baseball!"; Transliteration: "San Baka Chō Yakyū!" (Japanese: 3バカ超野球！)	Taro Sakamoto	Naruhisa Arakawa	August 6, 1993
25	"The Grouped Opposite Squadron"; Transliteration: "Zorozoro Ura Sentai" (Japanese: ぞろぞろ裏戦隊)	Takeshi Ogasawara	Susumu Takaku	August 13, 1993
26	"A Bad, Bad, Bad Guy"; Transliteration: "Iya na Iya na Iya na Yatsu" (Japanese: 嫌な嫌な嫌な奴)	Katsuya Watanabe	Toshiki Inoue	August 20, 1993
27	"It It It's the Final Punch"; Transliteration: "Saishū-ken da da da" (Japanese: 最終拳だだだッ)	Katsuya Watanabe	Toshiki Inoue	August 27, 1993
28	"Everyone Appears!!"; Transliteration: "Sō Tōjō dagya!!" (Japanese: 総登場だぎゃ!!)	Takeshi Ogasawara	Noboru Sugimura	September 3, 1993
29	"The Secret Inside Story of a Mother and Child's Tears"; Transliteration: "Haha Ko Namida no Maruhi Urabanashi" (Japanese: 母子涙の㊙裏話)	Shohei Tojo	Noboru Sugimura	September 10, 1993
30	"The Deadly, Fast-Talking Workaholic"; Transliteration: "Hissatsu Hayakuchi Shigotonin" (Japanese: 必殺早口仕事人)	Shohei Tojo	Noboru Sugimura	September 17, 1993
31	"Again, a New Hero Came Forth"; Transliteration: "Mata Deta Nyū Hīrō" (Japanese: また出た新戦士(ニューヒーロー))	Shohei Tojo	Noboru Sugimura	September 24, 1993
32	"The Ogre's Golden Kick"; Transliteration: "Ōgon Kikku no Oni" (Japanese: 黄金キックの鬼)	Yoshiaki Kobayashi	Noboru Sugimura	October 1, 1993
33	"An Idol's First Experience"; Transliteration: "Aidoru Hatsu Taiken" (Japanese: アイドル初体験)	Katsuya Watanabe	Naruhisa Arakawa	October 8, 1993
34	"A Prickly Maiden Hunt"; Transliteration: "Togetoge Shōjo-gari" (Japanese: トゲトゲ少女狩)	Yoshiaki Kobayashi	Susumu Takaku	October 15, 1993
35	"New Secret Art, the Dance of Spiders"; Transliteration: "Shin Ōgi Kumo no Mai" (Japanese: 新奥義クモの舞)	Katsuya Watanabe	Toshiki Inoue	October 22, 1993
36	"A 6000-Year Grudge..."; Transliteration: "Urami-bushi Rokusennen..." (Japanese: 恨み節6千年…)	Taro Sakamoto	Kunio Fujii	October 29, 1993
37	"You Have to See It!! A Huge Guy"; Transliteration: "Hikken!! Dekee Yatsu" (Japanese: 必見!! でけェ奴)	Shohei Tojo	Noboru Sugimura	November 5, 1993
38	"Huh!! A Ceasefire!?"; Transliteration: "Ē!! Teisen!?" (Japanese: えーッ!! 停戦!?)	Shohei Tojo	Noboru Sugimura	November 12, 1993
39	"The Demon Fist Falls in the Setting Sun"; Transliteration: "Maken Rakujitsu ni Chiru" (Japanese: 魔拳 落日に散る)	Takeshi Ogasawara	Toshiki Inoue	November 19, 1993
40	"Farewell! 3 Stooges"; Transliteration: "Saraba! San Baka" (Japanese: さらば！3バカ)	Shohei Tojo	Naruhisa Arakawa	November 26, 1993
41	"Kujaku's Great Ascension"; Transliteration: "Kujaku Dai Shōten" (Japanese: クジャク大昇天)	Taro Sakamoto	Kunio Fujii	December 3, 1993
42	"A Straight Line to Mommy"; Transliteration: "Kāchan Itchokusen" (Japanese: 母ちゃん一直線)	Takeshi Ogasawara	Noboru Sugimura	December 10, 1993
43	"The Revealed Prohibited Past"; Transliteration: "Gekihaku Kindan no Kako" (Japanese: 激白禁断の過去)	Katsuya Watanabe	Noboru Sugimura	December 17, 1993
44	"Impression!! You Cry Too"; Transliteration: "Kandō!! Kimi mo Nake" (Japanese: 感動!! 君も泣け)	Katsuya Watanabe	Noboru Sugimura	December 24, 1993
45	"Disbanding for Real!!"; Transliteration: "Maji de Kaisan" (Japanese: 本気(マジ)で解散!!)	Taro Sakamoto	Noboru Sugimura	January 7, 1994
46	"The Heroes Are Stark Naked"; Transliteration: "Hīrō Maruhadaka" (Japanese: 英雄(ヒーロー)まるはだか)	Taro Sakamoto	Noboru Sugimura	January 14, 1994
47	"The Amazing Truth"; Transliteration: "Suggē Shinjitsu" (Japanese: すっげェ～真実)	Takeshi Ogasawara	Naruhisa Arakawa	January 21, 1994
48	"Death of the Heroic Master!!"; Transliteration: "Sōzetsu!! Dōshi Shisu" (Japanese: 壮絶!! 道士死す)	Takeshi Ogasawara	Noboru Sugimura	January 28, 1994
49	"It's the Final Decisive Battle"; Transliteration: "Saishū Kessen dā" (Japanese: 最終決戦だァッ)	Shohei Tojo	Noboru Sugimura	February 4, 1994
50 (Final)	"Let's Go"; Transliteration: "Iku zoō" (Japanese: 行くぞォォッ)	Shohei Tojo	Noboru Sugimura	February 11, 1994

== Movie ==
The film version of Gosei Sentai Dairanger premiered in Japan on April 17, 1993, at Toei Super Hero Fair '93. Directed by Shōhei Tōjō and written by Noboru Sugimura, the movie was originally shown as a triple feature alongside Kamen Rider ZO and the film version of Tokusou Robo Janperson. The main villain of the film is an original monster, named the Duke Trump (トランプ公爵, Toranpu Kōshaku), who gathers four of the Dairangers' previous adversaries to defeat them. While the movie was filmed between episodes 5–8, its story actually takes place between episodes 8 and 9 due to the appearance of DairenOh. Shōhei Shibata, the young actor who played Hiroshi Mochizuki in ZO later joined the cast of Dairanger as Akomaru, son of the main villain Shadam.

== Cast ==
- Ryo of the Heavenly Fire Star: Keiichi Wada (和田 圭市, Wada Keiichi)
- Daigo of the Heavenly Illusion Star: Tatsuya Nōmi (能見 達也, Nōmi Tatsuya)
- Shoji of the Heavenly Gravity Star: Ei Hamura (羽村 英, Hamura Ei)
- Kazu of the Heavenly Time Star: Keisuke Tsuchiya (土屋 圭輔, Tsuchiya Keisuke)
- Rin of the Heavenly Wind Star: Natsuki Takahashi (高橋 夏樹, Takahashi Natsuki)
- Kou of the Howling New Star: Hisashi Sakai (酒井 寿, Sakai Hisashi)
- Master Kaku: Koji Naka (中 康治, Naka Kōji)
- Commander Shadam: Rintarō Nishi (西 凜太朗, Nishi Rintarō)
- Commander Gara: Kaya Hanezu (朱花 伽寧, Hanezu Kaya) (Note: Credited as Akiko Amamatsuri (天祭 揚子, Amamatsuri Akiko).)
- Lieutenant Commander Zydos: Maroshi Tamura (田村 円, Tamura Maroshi)
- Kameo: Sugisaku Imagawa (今川 杉作, Imagawa Sugisaku; 22–29), Ikko Tadano (ただの いっこ, Tadano Ikko; 29–50) (Note: Credited as Tomihisa Naruse (成瀬 富久, Naruse Tomihisa).)
- Grandmaster Guhon: Takeshi Kuwabara (桑原 毅, Kuwabara Takeshi)
- Kou's mother: Mikiko Miki (三輝 みきこ, Miki Mikiko)
- Jin Matoba: Yutaka Hirose (広瀬 裕, Hirose Yutaka) (Note: Credited as Takumi Hirose (広瀬 匠, Hirose Takumi).)
- Kujaku: Masako Morishita (森下 雅子, Morishita Masako)
- Akomaru: Shōhei Shibata (柴田 翔平, Shibata Shōhei)
- General Denpou: Chūkō Ueda (上田 忠好, Ueda Chūkō)
- Gorma XV: Munemaru Kōda (幸田 宗丸, Kōda Munemaru)

=== Voice cast ===
- Byakko Shinken: Wataru Abe (阿部 渡, Abe Wataru)
- General Kamikaze: Nobuyuki Hiyama (檜山 修之, Hiyama Nobuyuki)
- President Gravestone: Takuzō Kamiyama (神山 卓三, Kamiyama Takuzō)
- Master Telephone: Akiko Muta (むた あきこ, Muta Akiko)
- Narration: Hironori Miyata (宮田 浩徳, Miyata Hironori)

=== Guest cast ===
- Archbishop Riju (7–8): Ulf Ōtsuki (大月 ウルフ, Ōtsuki Urufu)
- Viscount Cherry Blossom (サクラ子爵, Sakura Shishaku; Voice; 10): Jun Yoshida (吉田 淳, Yoshida Jun)
- Shōichirō Takamura (高村 翔一郎, Takamura Shōichirō; 33): Ryosuke Kaizu (海津 亮介, Kaizu Ryōsuke)
- Human form of General Cactus (サボテン将軍, Saboten Shōgun; 34): Satoru Saitō (斉藤 暁, Saitō Satoru)

== Songs ==
Opening theme

- Gosei Sentai Dairanger (五星戦隊ダイレンジャー, Gosei Sentai Dairenjā)
  - Lyrics: Saburo Yatsude (八手 三郎, Yatsude Saburō)
  - Composition: Katsuo Ōno (大野 克夫, Katsuo Ōno)
  - Arrangement: Kenji Yamamoto (山本 健司, Yamamoto Kenji)
  - Artist: New Jack Takurō (NEW JACK拓郎)

Ending theme

- Ore-tachi Muteki sa!! Dairanger (俺たち無敵さ!! ダイレンジャー, Ore-tachi Muteki sa!! Dairenjā; We're Invincible!! Dairanger)
  - Lyrics: Saburo Yatsude
  - Composition: Katsuo Ōno
  - Arrangement: Kenji Yamamoto
  - Artist: New Jack Takurō

== See also ==
- Mighty Morphin Power Rangers season 2
- Mighty Morphin Power Rangers: The Movie
