= Izo =

2004 film by Takashi Miike

- Film poster
- Directed by: Takashi Miike
- Written by: Shigenori Takechi
- Produced by: Taizô Fukumaki; Fujio Matsushima
- Starring: Kazuya Nakayama; Takeshi Kitano; Bob Sapp
- Release date: 21 August 2004 (Japan)
- Running time: 128 minutes
- Languages: Japanese; English

IZO is a 2004 Japanese surrealist period horror film directed by Takashi Miike. The main character of the film is Izo Okada (1832–1865), the historical samurai and assassin in 19th-century Japan who was tortured and executed by beheading in Tosa.

Izo appeared previously in Hideo Gosha's Hitokiri (1969), then played by Shintaro Katsu. However, Miike's portrayal of the character (or rather his spirit) transcends reality (and time and space) and is more of a surrealist exposé of Izo's exceedingly bloody yet philosophical encounters in an afterlife heavy on symbolism, occasionally interrupted by stock footage of World War II accompanied by acid-folk singer Kazuki Tomokawa on guitar. Kazuya Nakayama plays Izo and the many characters he encounters on his journey include figures played by Takeshi Kitano and Bob Sapp.

== Cast ==
- Kazuya Nakayama as Okada Izo
- Kaori Momoi
- Ryuhei Matsuda
- Ryôsuke Miki as Hampeita Takechi
- Yuya Uchida as Spirit
- Masumi Okada as Politician
- Hiroki Matsukata
- Hiroshi Katsuno as Samurai
- Masato as Samurai
- Bob Sapp as Monk
- Takeshi Caesar as Samurai
- Takeshi Kitano as The Prime Minister
- Daijiro Harada as Judge
- Renji Ishibashi as Samurai
- Mickey Curtis as Monk
- Kazuki Tomokawa
- Taisaku Akino
- Hiroyuki Nagato as Elder
- Susumu Terajima
- Saburō Shinoda
- Ken Ogata
- Joe Yamanaka

== Awards ==
Izo was awarded the best Special Effects prize at the Sitges Film Festival (Spanish international festival specializing in fantasy and horror films).
