= Rankin' Taxi =

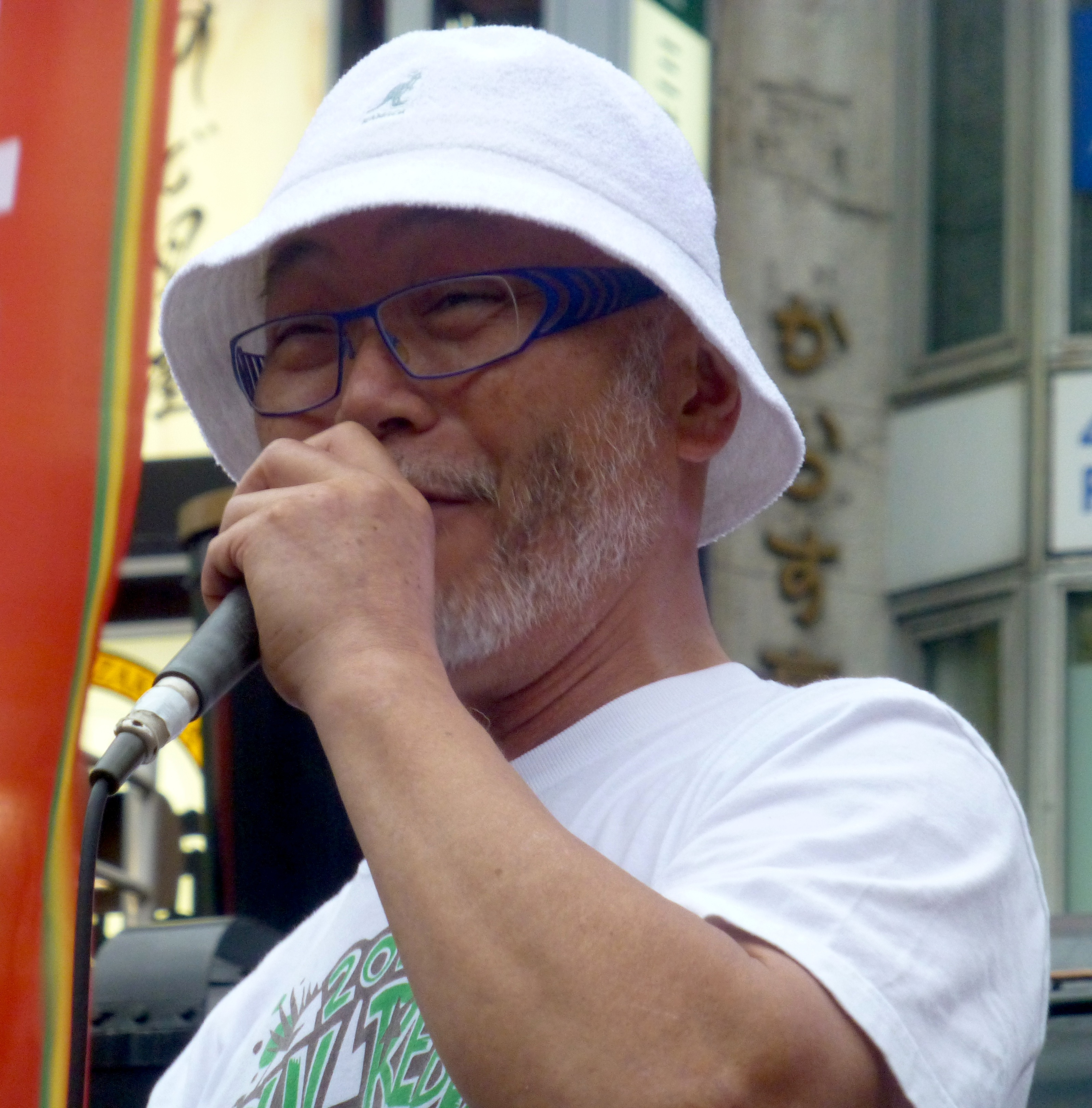
Rankin' Taxi in Shimbashi, 2016

Rankin' Taxi (born 9 February 1953) is a Japanese reggae artist, from Yokohama. In 2011, he re-recorded his 1989 anti-nuclear song 誰にも見えない、匂いもない (You can't see it, you can't smell it) with Dub Ainu Band, which despite receiving little airplay in the mainstream Japanese media, attracted the attention of the New York Times in June 2011 in an article by Dan Grunebaum titled Japan's New Wave of protest songs, after it became popular following the Fukushima nuclear disaster.

== See also ==
- RC Succession
