= Kazuya Nakayama =

Japanese actor and film producer

Kazuya Nakayama (中山一也) is a Japanese actor and producer known for films such as Izo and Agitator directed by Takashi Miike.

== Filmography ==
- Keiji monogatari 2 - Ringo no uta (1983)
- Renzoku satsujinki: Reiketsu (1984)
- We're No Angels 2 (1993)
- Agitator (2001)
- Izo (2004)
- Waru: kanketsu-hen (2006)
- Jitsuroku Shinsengumi (2006)
- Jitsuroku Shinsengumi: kanketsu-hen (2006)
- Waru (2006)
- Detective Story (2007)
- Johnen: Love of Sada (2008)
