= Resurrection (video) =

Video by Flower Travellin' Band
- Released: 2008
- Genre: Acid rock Progressive rock

Resurrection is a 2008 live DVD released only in Japan by Flower Travellin' Band. It commemorates their reunion in the 21st century, and features two discs. The first disc features an entire concert, while the second features interviews and other special features. It was recorded at the Hibiya Open-Air Concert Hall.

== Concert track listing ==
- "Make Up"
- "What Will You Say"
- "We Are Here"
- "Woman (Shadows of Lost Days)"
- "dYE-jobe"
- "The Sleeping Giant (Resurrection)"
- "Over & Over"
- "Don't Touch My Dreadlocks"
- "Love Is . . ."
- "Slowly But Surely"
- "Satori Part II"
- "Hiroshima"
- "Will It"
