= Japrocksampler =

2007 book by Julian Cope

- Cover of Japrocksampler, utilizing the cover art of the Flower Travellin' Band album Anywhere.
- Author: Julian Cope
- Language: English
- Subject: Japanese rock
- Publisher: Bloomsbury Publishing
- Publication date: 3 September 2007
- Publication place: United Kingdom
- Media type: Hardback
- Pages: 288 pp
- ISBN: 0-7475-8945-3
- OCLC: 144596369

Japrocksampler: How the Post-war Japanese Blew Their Minds on Rock 'n' Roll is a book written by author and musician Julian Cope and published by Bloomsbury on 3 September 2007.

== Overview ==
The 304-page hardcover book is a companion piece to Cope's 1995 book on Krautrock, Krautrocksampler, and covers in extensive detail the post-war democratizing and westernizing of Japan, plus a detailed 28-page analysis of the experimental music scene from 1951 to 1969. The first part, about the 1960s, was described by Simon Reynolds as a "prequel to the book proper". The unusual relationship between Japanese experimental theatre and rock music is carefully explained in the 14-page essay 'J.A. Caesar and the Radical Theatre Music of Japan'. There are also detailed biographies of the bands Taj Mahal Travellers, Flower Travellin' Band, Les Rallizes Denudes, Far East Family Band and Speed, Glue & Shinki.

== Reception ==
Simon Reynolds found Japrocksampler to contain some extraneous material and wrote that "a certain windy ponderousness of phrase and tone creeps into the prose now and then". But Reynolds also argued, "If Cope's exaltation of Les Rallizes Denudes seems like mystique-building covering up simple underachievement [...], elsewhere his evocations [...] are enticing and convincing." Helen Zaltzman praised it in The Observer as exhaustive but said that "one senses that despite his intense interest in the subject, Cope is padding out his material because there were simply not enough bands in the movement with which he is concerned. [...] Though fans will no doubt relish the jaunt through the Archdrude's mind, less committed readers may be put off by his tendency to pomposity, repetition and leaden pace."

Michel Faber wrote, "Cope's descriptions are tantalising but no replacement for hearing the music itself, so the book's usefulness depends on whether it inspires you to rush off in search of [classic albums] [...] Less adventurous readers may simply enjoy the anecdotes about a host of chancers, mad idealists, Buddhist gangsters, Monkees clones [...] and bonafide geniuses." Faber said that Cope's "lack of affinity with folk or the subtler forms of jazz causes him to ignore or sideline many of Japan's most distinctive artists." But Faber still argued that it was the best book on Japanese rock music available.

Sam Jordison praised the book as "utterly wonderful" and said, "Before reading it I knew nothing about this subject. [...] Now, I know even less than before." Jordison stated that "part of the pleasure of the book is his unbounded enthusiasm for the strange arcana he has dug up."
