= Flower Travellin' Band =

Japanese band

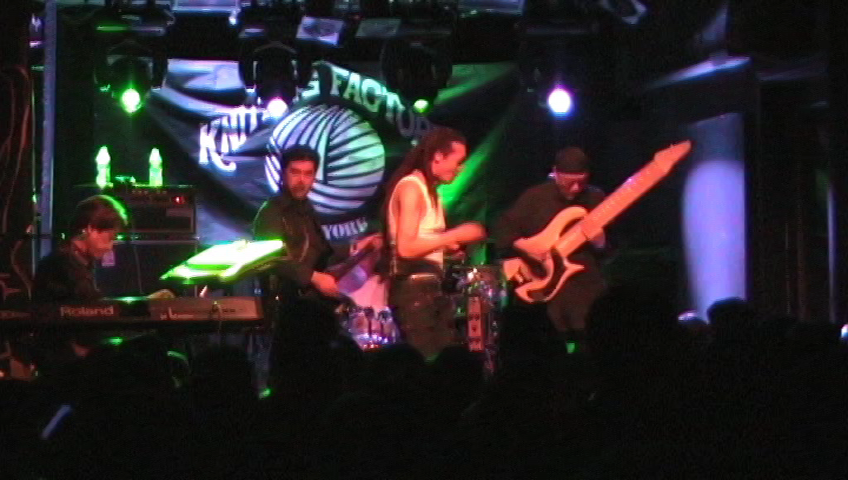
- Flower Travellin' Band performing in New York City in 2008.

Background information
- Also known as: FTB; Flower Travelling Band; Yuya Uchida & the Flowers
- Origin: Tokyo, Japan
- Genres: Psychedelic rock; heavy metal; progressive rock; acid rock
- Years active: 1967–1973; 2007–2011
- Labels: Polydor; Atlantic; GRT; Warner; Pony Canyon
- Past members: Joji "George" Wada; Yuya Uchida; Remi Aso; Katsuhiko Kobayashi; Susumu Oku; Ken Hashimoto; Hiroshi Chiba; Kento Nakamura; Joe Yamanaka; Hideki Ishima; Jun Kobayashi; Nobuhiko Shinohara
- Website: flowertravellingband.com

Flower Travellin' Band (Japanese: フラワー・トラベリン・バンド, Hepburn: Furawā Toraberin Bando) was a Japanese rock band that was formed in 1967. They were connected to Japan's counterculture movement and noted for their mixture of early heavy metal with psychedelic and progressive rock. They received wide acclaim from critics but failed to achieve commercial success and separated in 1973 to pursue individual careers. The band reunited in late 2007, but permanently disbanded after the 2011 death of vocalist Joe Yamanaka.

While the band's releases have never sold well they continue to be held in high regard by the music industry. Their albums have never been out of print and they continue to be made available on new audiophile formats such as SHM-CDs. Former members of the Flower Travellin' Band continue to perform FTB songs live together under the name Flower Power with other musicians.

== History ==
The band was initially started as a side-project by Yuya Uchida when he returned to Japan after visiting his friend John Lennon in England in the mid-1960s, where he was introduced to various upcoming artists such as Cream and Jimi Hendrix. Yuya wanted to introduce a similar sound to the Japanese, and formed the "Flowers" as a cover band with various group sounds musicians, and two vocalists; male singer Hiroshi Chiba and female singer Remi Aso. They released the album Challenge! in 1968, featuring covers of songs by Jimi Hendrix, Cream, Jefferson Airplane and Big Brother and the Holding Company, in addition to an original song. The cover caused a stir in the Japanese media as it depicted each member posing naked.

In 1969, after the release of the album, Remi Aso and guitarist Katsuhiko Kobayashi relocated to the United States. Yuya dropped all the remaining members, except drummer George Wada, recruited guitarist Hideki Ishima and vocalist Joe Yamanaka from the blues group Mystic Morning and bassist Jun Kobayashi, and formed the Flower Travellin' Band as a band that would appeal to international audiences. Their first releases were backing jazz trumpeter Terumasa Hino on the single "Crash" followed by the mini-album Anywhere in 1970, made to emulate the Flowers' release by means of cover songs and a nude photo on the album's front.

At Expo '70, members of Canadian rock band Lighthouse saw Flower Travellin' Band perform, liked what they saw and suggested they go to Canada. The group quickly recorded their first album of original material, Satori released in 1971, to have something to bring with them. In December 1970, they relocated to Toronto where they performed with Dr. John and Emerson, Lake & Palmer. In June 1971 they performed a large concert with Lighthouse at Ontario Place, which drew over 9000 people. The Flower Travellin' Band performed prior to Lighthouse, and drew a standing ovation for their set, plus a call for an encore. That year, they had several other concerts, for example, one in Toronto's Stanley Park Stadium, and another in Hamilton, Ontario, While in Toronto they recorded their second original album Made in Japan and were approached by GRT Records.

They returned to Japan in March 1972 for a show at the Tokyo Metropolitan Gymnasium, and in 1973 were billed to perform with the Rolling Stones throughout their Japanese tour; however, all concerts were canceled when Mick Jagger's visa was rejected due to a drug conviction. They released a half-studio, half-live album titled Make Up and in April performed at Maruyama Park in Kyoto.

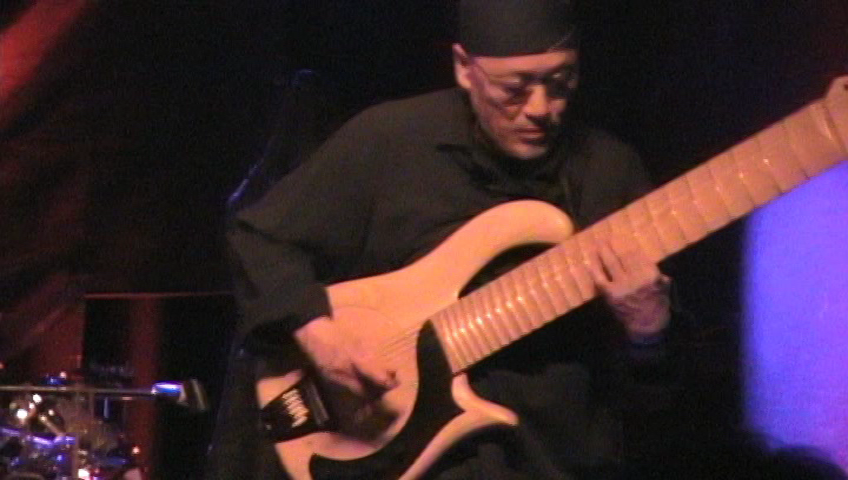
Hideki Ishima abandoned guitar in 1990 and has played the sitarla, an instrument he invented, exclusively since 2000.

It was their last concert before a long hiatus, as at this time Yuya became involved in numerous projects and each member went on to an individual career. Joe Yamanaka recorded numerous solo albums, and collaborated with the iconic reggae band The Wailers in the 1980s. Having quit the guitar in 1990, Hideki Ishima continued his studies of the sitar, which he began around 1968, under Indian classical musician Manilal Nag and his Japanese apprentice in 1998. In 2000, he invented the sitarla, which combines the qualities of a solid-body electric guitar and the sitar.

On November 25, 2007, Flower Travellin' Band officially reunited and formally recruited keyboardist Nobuhiko Shinohara, with whom they had previously worked. Ishima stated that they had never officially disbanded and revealed that there were several talks about getting back together prior, but they were all centered around nostalgia, something in which he has no interest. It was only when their producer suggested they write new material and play it together with the old songs for a three-year period that a reunion came to fruition. Ishima also said that even though Kobayashi and Wada had not played in years, they were eager and pushed him into doing it, helped by the fact that his new instrument made the old material interesting. In 2008, 35 years after their last, they released the album We Are Here. They performed in New York City in November and in Canada the following month. In March 2010, future tours and productions were halted when it was announced that Yamanaka was diagnosed with lung cancer. Yamanaka died from his cancer on August 7, 2011, at the age of 64, putting an end to the band. Yuya Uchida died from pneumonia in a Tokyo hospital on March 17, 2019, aged 79.

== Members ==
- Joji "George" Wada (和田ジョージ) – drums (1967–1973, 2007–2011)
- Joe Yamanaka (ジョー山中) – vocals, harmonica (1969–1973, 2007–2011, his death)
- Hideki Ishima (石間秀樹) – sitarla, guitar, sitar (1969–1973, 2007–2011)
- Jun Kobayashi (小林ジュン), formerly Jun Kozuki (上月ジュン) – bass (1969–1973, 2007–2011)
- Nobuhiko Shinohara (篠原信彦) – keyboards (2007–2011)
- Yuya Uchida (内田 裕也) – percussion, backing vocals, producer (1967–1973, died 2019)
- Remi Aso (麻生レミ) – vocals, guitar (1967–1969)
- Katsuhiko Kobayashi (小林勝彦) – guitar (1967–1969)
- Susumu Oku (奥ススム) – guitar, backing vocals (1967–1969)
- Ken Hashimoto (橋本健) – bass (1967–1969)
- Hiroshi Chiba (千葉ひろし) – vocals (1967–1968)
- Kento Nakamura (中村健人) – vocals (1968–1969)

Timeline

== Discography ==
=== Yuya Uchida & the Flowers ===
Studio albums

- Challenge! (1969) – Debut album.

Singles

- "Last Chance" b/w "Flower Boy" (1969) – Single.
- "Flower Boy" b/w "Last Chance" (1969) – Single.
- "Fantastic Girl" b/w "Yogiri no Trumpet" (1969) – Single.

Appearances

- Opera from the Works of Tadanori Yokoo (1969) – Multimedia compilation by Toshi Ichiyanagi and featuring various artists.
- Rock 'n' Roll Jam '70 (1970) – Live album featuring various artists. The Flowers perform "All Is Loneliness", "Piece of My Heart", "You Shook Me" and "Cozmic Blues".

=== Flower Travellin' Band ===
Studio albums

- Anywhere (1970) – First Flower Travellin' Band album.
- Satori (1971) – First original studio album.
- Made in Japan (1972) – Second original studio album.
- Make Up (1973) – Double album, consisting of both live and studio recordings. Featuring keyboardist Nobuhiko Shinohara.
- We Are Here (2008) – First album after reuniting without Yuya Uchida.

Singles

- "Crash" b/w "Dhoop" (1970) – Single with trumpeter Terumasa Hino and the first recording credited to the Flower Travellin' Band.
- "Map" b/w "Machine Gun Kelly" (1971) – Split single with American band Jo Mama.
- "Satori Pt. 1" (1971) – Canada-only single. (#28 in Canada)

Compilations

- Satori (1971) – Canada-only compilation album.
- The Times (1975) – A best-of album.

Videos

- Resurrection (2008) – DVD.

Others

- Kirikyogen (1970) – Album by Kuni Kawachi, sometimes co-credited to the Flower Travellin' Band although only Yamanaka and Ishima took part.
