= Yuya Uchida (singer) =

Japanese singer, record producer, and actor (1939–2019)

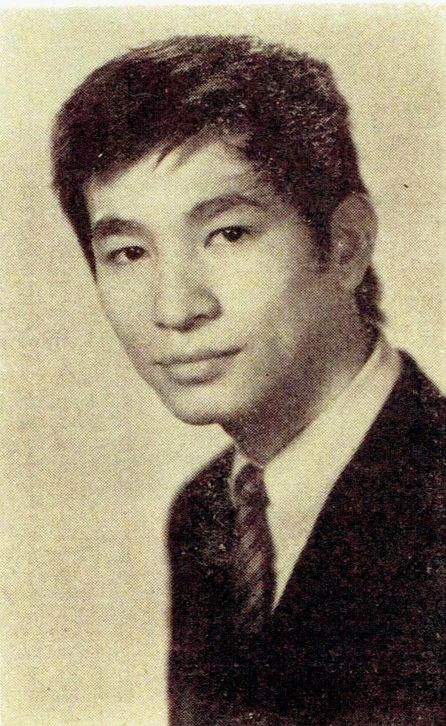
- Yuya Uchida in 1963

Background information
- Born: Yuya Uchida (内田 雄也); November 17, 1939; Nishinomiya, Hyōgo Prefecture, Japan
- Died: March 17, 2019 (aged 79) Tokyo, Japan
- Genres: Rock
- Occupations: Singer; record producer; actor
- Instrument: Vocals
- Years active: 1959–2019
- Formerly of: Flower Travellin' Band/The Flowers
- Spouse: Kirin Kiki (m. 1973; died 2018)

Yuya Uchida (Japanese: 内田 裕也, Hepburn: Uchida Yūya; November 17, 1939 – March 17, 2019) was a Japanese singer, record producer, and actor. With a career spanning six decades, he was a major figure in Japanese music. Kazuo Takeda stated that Japanese rock would not be what it is today without Uchida, as he was one of the first to bring what was happening in the West in the mid-1960s back to Japan.

He appeared in numerous films, such as Nagisa Ōshima's Merry Christmas, Mr. Lawrence, and won two best acting awards. He also starred in the American film Black Rain.

== Career ==
Uchida was born in Nishinomiya. He dropped out of high school at age 17 and began his music career in 1957. He became friends with John Lennon after opening for The Beatles on their 1966 tour of Japan.

Shocked after seeing Jimi Hendrix perform in London in 1967, Uchida returned home and wanted to introduce a similar sound to Japan. He formed Yuya Uchida & The Flowers who released the album Challenge! in 1969, which is composed almost entirely of covers of Western psychedelic rock acts. After replacing all but one member and Uchida reverting to a producer/manager role himself, the group changed their name to Flower Travellin' Band and released another cover album, 1970's Anywhere, before relocating to Canada. Before the move they recorded an album of original material in just two days; Satori was released in North America in 1971 by GRT Records. The band produced two more albums, Made in Japan (1972) and Make Up (1973), before separating for 34 years.

In addition to his solo career and Flower Travellin' Band, he worked with a large variety of musicians both domestic and international, and recorded with The Ventures and Frank Zappa in the mid-1970s. In 1975 he produced an international music festival titled "World Rock Festival" which featured artists from around the world performing together. That same year, Uchida also produced the self-titled album by Creation.

He unsuccessfully ran for the 1991 Tokyo gubernatorial election.

Uchida collaborated with pop idol Rino Sashihara for the 2014 duet single "Shekina Baby".

== Personal life and legal troubles ==
Yuya Uchida married actress Kirin Kiki in 1973. The two separated two years later but remained legally married until her death in 2018. Their daughter Yayako Uchida is an essayist/singer and married to actor Masahiro Motoki, who was adopted into the Uchida family as a mukoyōshi. Yuya was the grandfather to three children by his daughter.

Uchida was arrested in September 1977 for violating Japan's Cannabis Control Law. Although Uchida admitted ten years later that he was smoking it at the time, the charges were dropped Nolle prosequi. He was arrested again in 1983 for violating Japan's Firearm and Sword Possession Control Law. Uchida entered the offices of Udo Artists, Inc. with a kitchen knife and threatened a rock promoter for allegedly paying foreign artists far more money than Japanese ones. Again, he was never indicted.

Uchida successfully underwent emergency eye surgery on May 31, 2005, for a blocked retinal artery, which would have led to blindness. In mid-November 2005, his house was broken into and several watches and jackets were stolen.

On May 13, 2011, Uchida was arrested for assault and trespassing after threatening his former girlfriend, whom he began dating in December 2009. The police said that Uchida allegedly hit the 50-year-old woman after she tried ending their relationship in March and began sending her threatening letters. The woman said she had her locks changed, but Uchida then had another locksmith open the door and entered her house on April 19. Uchida acknowledged writing the letters and having spare keys made to her house, but denied threatening her.

== Death ==
Yuya Uchida died from pneumonia in a Tokyo hospital on March 17, 2019, aged 79. He received a Lifetime Achievement Award at the 61st Japan Record Awards on December 30, 2019.

== Discography ==
Singles

- "Lonely Johnny/Young One" (ひとりぼっちのジョニー／ヤング ワン; 1963)
- "Young Heart o Urimono ni/Medal no Jōi" (破れたハートを売り物に／メダルのジョーイ; 1963)
- "Kanashiki Akuma/Cutie Pie" (悲しき悪魔／キューティー・パイ; 1963)
- "Blue Jean to Kawa Jumper/Gypsy Caravan" (ブルージーンと皮ジャンパー／ジプシー・キャラヴァン; 1964)
- "Viva Las Vegas/Roll Over Beethoven" (ラスベガス万才／ロール・オーバー・ベートーベン; 1964)
- "Swim de Ikou/Run Run Run" (スイムで行こう／ラン ラン ラン; 1965)
- "Last Chance/Flower Boy" (ラスト・チャンス／フラワー・ボーイ; 1969, Yuya Uchida & The Flowers)
- "Fantastic Girl/Yogiri no Trumpet" (ファンタジック・ガール／夜霧のトランペッ; 1969, Yuya Uchida & The Flowers)
- "Manjoki Rock n Roll/Joki-yasu Boogie" (マンジョキロックンロール／ジョキ安ブギ; 1974, Yuya Uchida and the 1815 Super Rock 'n' Roll Band)
- "Gonna Make It Tonight/Let's Twist No. 1" (1977)
- "What's Happening, Mr. Dylan?/Annie Get Your Guns" (1978)
- "Sake, Women & My Life/One Night Lullabye" (1979)
- "The Long Goodbye/Farewell My Lovely" (1982)
- "Killer in the Rain/Rolling on the Road" (1982)
- "Annie for a Cheek Time/No More Comics" (1985)
- "Shekina Baby" (シェキナベイベー; 2014, with Rino Sashihara)

Albums

- Rock Surfing Hot Rod (ロック・サーフィン・ホット・ロッド; 1964, with Isao Bitoh)
- Let's Go Monkey (レッツ・ゴー・モンキー; 1965, with Isao Bitoh)
- Challenge! (1969, Yuya Uchida & The Flowers)
- Y.U.Y.A 1815KC Rock'n Roll Broadcasting Station (1973)
- Exciting! Rock 'n' Roll Party (1973, Yuya Uchida and the 1815 Super Rock 'n' Roll Band)
- Hollywood (1975, Yuya Uchida and The Ventures)
- A Dog Runs (ア・ドッグ・ランズ; 1978)
- Farewell, My Lovely (さらば愛しき女よ; 1981)
- No More Comics (1985)

== Filmography ==
Year	Title	Role	Notes
1966	Kureji da yo: kisôtengai	Kentarô	
1966	Panchi yarô	Momoji	
1969	Burai: Barase	Musician	
1969	Dorifutazu desu yo! Tokkun tokkun mata tokkun		
1977	Furenzoku satsujin jiken	Koichi Doi	
1977	Jitsuroku furyo shoujo: Kan	Tokio	
1978	Pink Tush Girl	Sen'ichi Yamada	
1978	Eroticna kankei	Kôtarô Higaki	
1978	Kawajyan hankou zoku		
1979	Ejiki		
1979	Sûpâ gun redei Wani Bunsho	Tadao Toda, Robber of bank	
1980	Akai bôkô	Yuya	
1980	Shôjo shôfu: Kemono michi	Ataru	
1981	Yokohama BJ bûrusu		
1981	A! Onnatachi: Waika	Jyoji	
1982	Mizu no nai puuru	Man	
1983	Saraba aibô	Komatsu	
1983	Merry Christmas, Mr. Lawrence	Military prison commander	
1983	Jukkai no mosukîto	Hero	
1986	Comic Magazine	Toshiaki Kinameri	
1987	Saraba itoshiki hito yo	Detective	
1988	Hanazono no meikyu	Sosuke Mitsuya	
1989	Zatoichi, Darkness Is His Ally	Boss Akabei	
1989	Black Rain	Nashida	
1992	Sakana kara daiokishin!!	Yuya	
1992	Erotikkuna kankei	Kishin	
1999	Kyohansha	Elder Giliyaku	
2002	Deadly Outlaw: Rekka		
2003	Akame 48 Waterfalls		
2004	Izo		
2007	Tantei monogatari		
2008	Johnen: Sada no ai		
2008	Rokku tanjô		
2016	Hoshikuzu kyôdai no aratana densetsu		(final film role)
