= Hideki Ishima =

Japanese musician (born 1944)

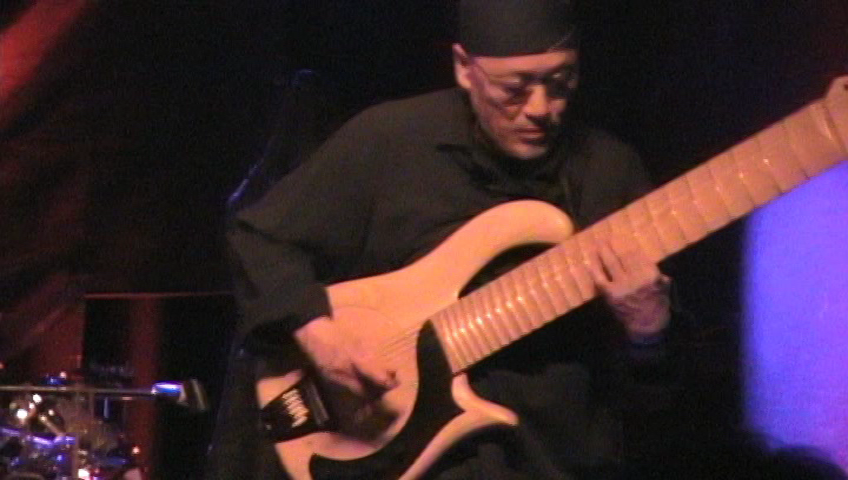
- Ishima playing a sitarla at the Knitting Factory in New York City in 2008.

Background information
- Born: March 21, 1944 (age 82); Sapporo, Hokkaido, Japan
- Genres: Rock, hindustani, psychedelic rock
- Occupation: Musician
- Instruments: Sitarla, sitar, guitar
- Years active: 1966–present
- Formerly of: Flower Travellin' Band
- Website: Official site

Hideki Ishima (Japanese: 石間 秀機, Hepburn: Ishima Hideki; born March 21, 1944 in Sapporo, Hokkaido) is a Japanese musician, known primarily for his work with Flower Travellin' Band and for creating the sitarla instrument. A guitarist and sitar player for nearly forty years, he now exclusively plays the sitarla, an instrument he invented in 2000 that combines aspects of a sitar with an electric guitar. Guitarists Kazuo Takeda, Akira Takasaki, Rolly, and Mikael Åkerfeldt have cited him as an influence.

== Career ==
Ishima started playing guitar at 19, at the behest of a friend who wanted to be in a band. His first group was Jarōzu (ジャローズ) in his native Sapporo shortly after graduating high school. He moved to Tokyo and formed the group sounds band The Beavers in 1966, who had released four albums and one single but had not had major success.

Ishima began playing sitar at 24, after researching Gábor Szabó at the suggestion of a woman and learning that the jazz guitarist also played this instrument he had never heard of. He taught himself from Ravi Shankar's 1968 book My Music, My Life, looking up the Japanese translations for the English words.

In 1969, while in the blues band Mystic Morning with Joe Yamanaka, the two of them were scouted by Yuya Uchida for Flower Travellin' Band. When they went on hiatus in 1973, Ishima recorded the solo album One Day and joined a group called Trans Am. After a few years off, he followed this with the Donjuan R&R Band with Kenichi Hagiwara. During the 1980s he was in Co-Colo alongside Kenji Sawada and Nobuhiko Shinohara, before being fired.

Ishima quit guitar in 1990, citing money problems. After a 40-minute sitar lesson from Manilal Nag during a trip to Japan in 1998, Ishima became a student of Nag's Japanese apprentice.

He made a comeback in 2000 exclusively playing the sitarla. That year, he recorded the album More-ish with the multinational group Pythagoras Party. The improvisational instrumental group View was formed in 2007. At the end of 2007, Flower Travellin' Band officially reunited. Ishima revealed that there were several talks about getting back together prior, but they were all centered around nostalgia, something he has no interest in. It was only when their producer suggested they write new material and play it together with the old songs for a three-year period that a reunion came to fruition. Ishima also said that even though two of the other members had not played in years, they were eager and pushed him into doing it, helped by the fact that his new instrument made the old material interesting.

== Sitarla ==
The sitarla (シターラ, shitāra) is an instrument that combines aspects of the sitar with the solid body electric guitar. It was conceptualized by Ishima and created by Masao Nagai in 2000. It is a hollow-bodied instrument, 3 1/2 tones lower than a guitar, with only three existing in the world as of 2008.

Ishima said he had the idea for the instrument 15 years prior, but everybody told him he was crazy. He now plays the instrument exclusively, and it replaced his guitar playing in Flower Travellin' Band when they reunited. It is featured on their 2008 album We Are Here. The sitarla was displayed at the 2000 NAMM Show.

== Discography ==
- One Day (1973)
