= Kenji Sawada discography =

The discography of singer, Kenji Sawada.

However, refer to the paragraph of "The Tigers" for the work of "The Tigers" and refer to the paragraph of "Pyg" for the work of "Pyg".

== Singles ==
Order	Release date	Title	Label	Release country	First Album
1970s
1	1 Nov 1971	Carrying You (Kimi Wo Nosete (My Boat For You))	Polydor Records	Japan	Non-album single
2	10 Mar 1972	Forbidden Love (Yurusarenai Ai (THE FORBIDDEN LOVE))	Polydor Records	Japan	Julie II
3	25 Jun 1972	You're All I Need (Anata Dake de ii (NOTHING BUT YOU))	Polydor Records	Japan	Non-album single
4	20 Sep 1972	I Don't Care If I Die (Shindemo Ii (I WOULD DIE FOR YOUR LOVE))	Polydor Records	Japan	Non-album single
5	1 Jan 1973	Love For You (Anata e no Ai (LOVE FOR YOU))	Polydor Records	Japan	Non-album single
6	21 Apr 1973	The Dangerous Duo Kiken na Futari (Two in the Face Of Danger)	Polydor Records	Japan	Non-album single
7	11 Aug 1973	A Heart Full Of Sorrow (Mune Ippai no Kanashimi)	Polydor Records	Japan	Julie VI Aru Seishun
8	21 Dec 1973	Enchanted Night (But In The Light) (Miserareta Yoru (Mais Dans La Lumiere))	Polydor Records	Japan	Non-album single
9	21 Mar 1974	Love's A Hindrance (Koi wa Jamamono)	Polydor Records	Japan	Non-album single
10	10 Jul 1974	Reminiscence (Tsuioku)	Polydor Records	Japan	Jewel Julie Tsuioku
11	1 Dec 1976	Fugitive of Love (Ai No Toubousha (THE FUGITIVE))	Polydor Records	Australia, Hong Kong, Japan, New Zealand, Singapore, United Kingdom	The Fugitive Ai No Toubousha
12	20 Jan 1975	My Love, I Come From The Ends Of The Earth (Mon Amour, Je Viens Du Bout Du Monde)		Austria, Belgium, Canada, France, Greece, Netherlands, Norway, Switzerland	Kenji Sawada
13	1 Mar 1975	The White Room (Shiroi Heya)	Polydor Records	Japan	Kenji Sawada
14	20 May 1975	Wait For Me (attends~moi)		Belgium, Canada, France, Netherlands, Spain, Switzerland	Kenji Sawada
15	21 May 1975	Alone in Paris (Pari ni Hitori)	Polydor Records	Japan	Kenji Sawada
16	21 Aug 1975	As Time Passes By (Toki no Sugiyuku Mama ni)	Polydor Records	Japan	Ikutsuka No Bamen
17	15 Oct 1975	Fou de Toi		Belgium, France, Netherlands	Kenji Sawada
18	21 Jan 1976	Tachidomaru Na Furimuku Na	Polydor Records	Japan	Non-album single
19	1 May 1976	Uinku De Sayonara	Polydor Records	Japan	Non-album single
20	15 May 1976	Elle		Belgium, France, Netherlands	Rock'n'roll Child
21	15 May 1976	When The Light Went Out		United Kingdom	Non-album single
22	10 Sep 1976	Kobaruto No Kisetsu No Naka De	Polydor Records	Japan	Chakoru-gurei No Shouzou
23	1 Feb 1977	Sayonara Wo Iu Ki Mo Nai	Polydor Records	Japan	Omoikiri Kiza Na Jinsei
24	21 Feb 1977	Julie Love		France	Rock'n'roll Child
25	21 May 1977	Katte ni Shiyagare	Polydor Records	Japan	Omoikiri Kiza Na Jinsei
26	30 Jul 1977	Memories	Polydor Records	Germany, Japan	Non-album single
27	5 Sep 1977	Nikumi Kirenai Rokudenashi	Polydor Records	Japan	Omoikiri Kiza Na Jinsei
28	1977	Tu As Change		France	Rock'n'roll Child
29	10 Oct 1977	Rock'n'roll Child		Belgium, Germany, Netherlands	Rock'n'roll Child
30	21 Jan 1978	Samurai	Polydor Records	Japan	Omoikiri Kiza Na Jinsei
31	21 Jan 1978	In The City		Germany	Rock'n'roll Child
32	21 May 1978	Daringu	Polydor Records	Japan	Kondo wa, Karei Na Utage Ni Douzo
33	1 Aug 1978	Yamato Yori Ai Wo Komete (Ending Theme for Farewell Space Battleship Yamato)		Japan	Kondo wa, Karei Na Utage Ni Douzo
34	10 Sep 1978	Love (Dakishimetai)		Japan	Love ~Ai Toha Fukou Wo Osorenai Koto~
35	1 Feb 1979	Kasaburanka Dandi		Japan	Non-album single
36	31 May 1979	Oh! Gal (OH! Gyaru)		Japan	Non-album single
37	21 Sep 1979	Ronri Urufu		Japan	Tokio
1980s
38	1 Jan 1980	Tokio		Japan	Tokio
39	21 Apr 1980	Koi No Baddo Chuningu		Japan	Bad Tuning
40	21 Sep 1980	Da-Ba-Da At The Bar (Sakaba De Dabada)		Japan	Non-album single
41	23 Dec 1980	Omae Ga Paradaisu		Japan	G.S. I love you
42	1 May 1981	Love Letter on the Shore Nagisa No Rabureta		Japan	S/T/R/I/P/P/E/R
43	21 Sep 1981	S/t/r/i/p/p/e/r (Sutorippa)		Japan	S/T/R/I/P/P/E/R
44	10 Jan 1982	Reijin		Japan	Non-album single
45	1 May 1982	Omae Ni Chekku In		Japan	A wonderful time
46	10 Sep 1982	6 Ban Me No Yuutsu		Japan	Non-album single
47	1 Jan 1983	Senaka Made 45 Fun		Japan	Mis Cast
48	10 May 1983	Hare Nochi Blue Boy		Japan	Non-album single
49	21 Sep 1983	Kimete Yaru Konya		Japan	Non-album single
50	10 Feb 1984	Donzoko		Japan	Non-album single
51	25 Apr 1984	Wataridori Haguredori		Japan	Non policy
52	25 Sep 1984	Amapola		Japan	Non-album single
53	8 Aug 1985	Hai To Daiyamondo	Toshiba-EMI	Japan	Kakuu No Opera
54	23 Apr 1986	Arifu Raira Ui Raira ~Senya Ichiya Monogatari~		Japan	Non-album single
55	22 Oct 1986	Goddess (Megami)		Japan	Non-album single
56	21 Mar 1987	Kiwadoi Kisetsu		Japan	Non-album single
57	22 Jul 1987	Steppin' Stones		Japan	Kokuhaku -Confession-
58	16 Nov 1987	Chance		Japan	Non-album single
59	25 Jun 1988	True Blue		Japan	True Blue
60	26 Oct 1988	Stranger -Only Tonight-		Japan	Non-album single
61	24 May 1989	Muda		Japan	Non-album single
62	20 Sep 1989	Poraroido Girl		Japan	Kare wa Nemurenai
1990s
63	7 Feb 1990	Down		Japan	Kare wa Nemurenai
64	23 May 1990	Sekai Ha Up & Fall		Japan	Sinpuru Na Eien
65	17 May 1991	Spleen ~Rokugatu No Kaze Ni Yurete~		Japan	Panorama
66	1 May 1992	Taiyo No Hitorigoto		Japan	Beautiful World
67	20 May 1993	Sono Kisu Ga Hoshii		Japan	Really Love Ya!!
68	16 Nov 1994	Hello		Japan	Hello
69	29 Nov 1995	Anjou Yariya		Japan	Sur←
70	6 Sep 1996	Ai Made Matenai		Japan	Ai Made Matenai
71	26 Mar 1997	Kimi Wo Maji Ni Aisenakuteha Hoka No Nani Mo Tsudukerarenai (The name of "Tea For Three")		Japan	Non-album single
72	10 Jun 1997	Oribu Oiru		Japan	Samosutatto Na Natsu
73	27 Aug 1997	Samosutatto Na Natsu		Japan	Samosutatto Na Natsu
74	16 Oct 1997	Koi Nante Yobanai		Japan	Samosutatto Na Natsu
75	24 Jun 1999	Kodou		Japan	Ii Kaze Yo Fuke
2000s
76	9 Aug 2000	Kitaru Beki Suteki		Japan	Kitaru Beki Suteki
77	8 Jun 2001	Ano Hi Ha Ame		Japan	Atarashii Omoide 2001
78	24 Oct 2001	Magokoro Yoridokoro (The name of "Kenji To Keiko")	Tokuma Japan	Japan	Non-album single
79	1 Sep 2002	Boukyaku No Tensai	Julie Label	Japan	Boukyaku No Tensai
80	25 Apr 2003	Ashita Ha Hareru	Julie Label	Japan	Ashita wa Hareru
81	25 Feb 2004	Oganikku Ogasumu	Julie Label	Japan	Croquemadame & Hotcakes
82	9 May 2005	Greenboy	Julie Label	Japan	Greenboy
83	21 Apr 2006	Ore Tachi Saikou	Julie Label	Japan	Ore Tachi Saikou
84	25 Jun 2007	Sotto Kuchiduke Wo	Julie Label	Japan	Ikitetara Shiawase
85	25 May 2008	Rock'n'roll March	Julie Label	Japan	Rock'n'roll March

== Albums ==
=== Studio albums ===
Order	Release date	Title	Label	Release country
1	1 Dec 1969	Julie	Polydor Records	Japan
2	21 Dec 1971	Julie II	Polydor Records	Japan
3	10 Sep 1972	Julie IV Ima Boku Ha Shiawase Desu	Polydor Records	Japan
4	21 Aug 1973	Julie VI Aru Seishun	Polydor Records	Japan
5	10 Sep 1974	Jewel Julie Tsuioku	Polydor Records	Japan
6	21 Dec 1974	The Fugitive Ai No Toubousha	Polydor Records	Japan
7	21 Jan 1975	The Fugitive (Kenji)		Hong Kong, Indonesia, Malaysia, United Kingdom
8	21 Dec 1975	Ikutsuka No Bamen	Polydor Records	Japan
9	1 Feb 1976	Kenji Sawada	Polydor Records	Belgium, France, Germany, Japan, Netherlands
10	1 Dec 1976	Chakoru-gurei No Shouzou	Polydor Records	Japan
11	15 Nov 1977	Omoikiri Kiza Na Jinsei	Polydor Records	Japan
12	Apr 1978	Rock'n'roll Child		France, Germany
13	10 Aug 1978	Kondo Ha, Karei Na Utage Ni Douzo	Polydor Records	Japan
14	1 Dec 1978	Love ~Ai Toha Fukou Wo Osorenai Koto~	Polydor Records	Japan
15	25 Nov 1979	Tokio	Polydor Records	Japan
16	21 Jul 1980	Bad Tuning	Polydor Records	Japan
17	23 Dec 1980	G.S.I Love You	Polydor Records	Japan
18	10 Jun 1981	S/T/R/I/P/P/E/R	Polydor Records	Japan
19	1 Jun 1982	A Wonderful Time	Polydor Records	Japan
20	10 Dec 1982	Mis Cast	Polydor Records	Japan
21	5 Mar 1983	Julie Song Calender	Apollon	Japan
22	1 Oct 1983	Onna Tachi Yo	Polydor Records	Japan
23	5 Jun 1984	Non Policy	Polydor Records	Japan
24	21 Sep 1985	Kakuu No Opera	Toshiba-EMI	Japan
25	25 Jun 1986	Co-CoLO 1 ~Yoru No Midara Na Tori Tachi	Toshiba-EMI	Japan
26	25 May 1987	Kokuhaku -Confession-	Toshiba-EMI	Japan
27	24 Jul 1988	True Blue	Toshiba-EMI	Japan
28	11 Oct 1989	Kare Ha Nemurenai	Toshiba-EMI	Japan
29	20 Jun 1990	Sinpuru Na Eien	Toshiba-EMI	Japan
30	14 Jun 1991	Panorama	Toshiba-EMI	Japan
31	10 Jun 1992	Beautiful World	Toshiba-EMI	Japan
32	17 Nov 1993	Really Love Ya!!	Toshiba-EMI	Japan
33	14 Dec 1994	Hello	Toshiba-EMI	Japan
34	13 Dec 1995	Sur←	Toshiba-EMI	Japan
35	19 Sep 1996	Ai Made Matenai	Toshiba-EMI	Japan
36	25 Jun 1997	Samosutatto Na Natsu	Toshiba-EMI	Japan
37	15 Jul 1998	Dairokkan	Toshiba-EMI	Japan
38	25 Aug 1999	Ii Kaze Yo Fuke	Toshiba-EMI	Japan
39	13 Sep 2000	Kitaru Beki Suteki	Toshiba-EMI	Japan
40	20 Jun 2001	Atarashii Omoide 2001	Toshiba-EMI	Japan
41	1 Sep 2002	Boukyaku No Tensai	Julie Label	Japan
42	25 Apr 2003	Ashita Ha Hareru	Julie Label	Japan
43	25 Feb 2004	Croquemadame & Hotcakes	Julie Label	Japan
44	9 May 2005	Greenboy	Julie Label	Japan
45	21 Apr 2006	Ore Tachi Saikou	Julie Label	Japan
46	25 Jun 2007	Ikitetara Shiawase	Julie Label	Japan
47	25 May 2008	Rock'n'roll March	Julie Label	Japan

=== Compilations ===
Order	Release date	Title	Label	Release country
1	Jun 10, 1973	Sawada Kenji Glorious 20	Polydor Records	Japan
2	Apr 10, 1974	Pafekuto	Polydor Records	Japan
3	Apr 25, 1975	Sawada Kenji Pafekuto 14	Polydor Records	Japan
4	Sep 10, 1976	Forever ~Sawada Kenji Besuto Serekushon	Polydor Records	Japan
5	Dec 15, 1977	Sawada Kenji Daizenshu	Polydor Records	Japan
6	1977	Rock'n Julie with Tigers	Polydor Records	Japan
7	Apr 1978	Yesterday Today		Hong Kong
8	Apr 1, 1979	Royal Straight Flush	Polydor Records	Japan
9	1981	Kenji Sawada Greatest Hits		Hong Kong
10	Dec 15, 1981	Royal Straight Flush II	Polydor Records	Japan
11	Oct 25, 1982	Jurii CM Songu Korekushon	Apollon	Japan
12	Mar 25, 1984	Royal Straight Flush III	Polydor Records	Japan
13	Sep 1, 1985	Zenkyokushu ~Hai To Daiyamondo	Polydor Records	Japan
14	Jun 1, 1986	Julie Special A Men Korekushon	Polydor Records	Japan
15	Aug 21, 1986	Waga Na Ha, Jurii		Japan
16	Sep 12, 1987	Super Best		Japan
17	Dec 4, 1991	A Saint in the Night	Toshiba-EMI	Japan
18	Nov 20, 1996	Sawada Kenji B Men Korekushon	Julie Label	Japan
19	Dec 11, 1996	Aftermath	Toshiba-EMI	Japan
20	Dec 10, 1997	Royal Straight Flush 1971–1979	Toshiba-EMI	Japan
21	Dec 10, 1997	Royal Straight Flush 1980–1996	Toshiba-EMI	Japan
22	Dec 10, 1997	Distortion Love	Toshiba-EMI	Japan

=== Live albums ===
Order	Release date	Title	Label	Release country
1	Mar 10, 1972	Julie III Sawada Kenji Recital	Polydor Records	Japan
2	Dec 21, 1972	Julie V Sawada Kenji Nissei Risaitaru	Polydor Records	Japan
3	Dec 21, 1973	Julie VII The 3rd Sawada Kenji Risaitaru	Polydor Records	Japan
4	Oct 21, 1975	Sawada Kenji Hieizan Furi Konsato	Polydor Records	Japan
5	Aug 10, 1977	Sawada Kenji Risaitaru Hamuretto in Jurii	Polydor Records	Japan
6	Oct 25, 1978	Julie Rock'n Tour'78 Denen Koroshiamu Raibu	Polydor Records	Japan
7	Aug 25, 1979	Julie Rock'n Tour'79	Polydor Records	Japan
8	Dec 25, 1987	Kakuu No Opera'86	Toshiba-EMI	Japan
9	Jan 16, 1992	'91 Budokan Konsato "Julie Mania"	Toshiba-EMI	Japan
10	Nov 20, 1996	Sawada Kenji Raibu Korekushon		Japan

=== Others ===
Order	Release date	Title	Label	Release country
1	Mar 21, 1981	Sayonara Nichigeki Uesutan Kanibaru		Japan
2	Jun 21, 1989	Yokohama Supa Opera "Kaikou" Kouen Kinen Ban		Japan
3	1996	Dora~100 Man Kai Ikita Neko		Japan
4	Oct 1999	ACT Daizenshu		Japan
