= Capone Cries a Lot =

1985 Japanese film

- Directed by: Seijun Suzuki
- Written by: Takeo Kimura; Atsushi Yamatoya; Toshiyuki Kajiyama (Novel)
- Produced by: Kenichi Nakamura
- Starring: Kenichi Hagiwara; Yūko Tanaka; Kenji Sawada; Akira Emoto
- Cinematography: Junichi Fujisawa; Akira Takada
- Edited by: Akira Suzuki
- Music by: Takayuki Inoue
- Production companies: K Enterprises; C.C.J.
- Distributed by: Shochiku
- Release date: February 16, 1985
- Running time: 130 minutes
- Countries: Japan; United States
- Languages: Japanese; English

Capone Cries a Lot (カポネ大いに泣く, Kapone ōi ni naku; aka Capone's Flood of Tears) is a 1985 Japanese comedy directed by Seijun Suzuki and starring Kenichi Hagiwara. The film is based on the novel of the same name by Toshiyuki Kajiyama.

== Plot ==
Umiemon (Kenichi Hagiwara) is a naniwa-bushi singer who travels with his wife to the United States in hopes of achieving fame and fortune.

== Cast ==
- Kenichi Hagiwara as Umiemon
- Yūko Tanaka as Kozome Takonoya
- Kenji Sawada as Tetsugoro Osawa
- Akira Emoto as Ushiemon
- Chuck Wilson as Al Capone
- Hachiro Tako as Boss of beggars
- Kirin Kiki as Sene Tachikawa
- Haruko Kato as Wife
- Shunsuke Kariya as Kondo
- Miki Takakura as Wife of an entertainer
- Tatsuo Umemiya as Hori
