= Black Test Car =

1962 Japanese film

- Film poster
- Directed by: Yasuzo Masumura
- Screenplay by: Kazuo Funahashi; Yoshihiro Ishimatsu
- Story by: Toshiyuki Kajiyama
- Starring: Jirō Tamiya; Junko Kanō; Hideo Takamatsu; Eiji Funakoshi
- Cinematography: Yoshihisa Nakagawa
- Edited by: Tatsuji Nakashizu
- Music by: Shigeru Ikeno
- Production company: Daiei
- Distributed by: Daiei
- Release date: July 7, 1962
- Running time: 95 minutes
- Country: Japan
- Language: Japanese

Black Test Car (Japanese: 黒の試走車(テストカー), Hepburn: Kuro no Tesuto Kā) is a 1962 Japanese crime thriller film directed by Yasuzo Masumura, co-written by Kazuo Funahashi and Yoshihiro Ishimatsu, and based on the novel of the same name by Toshiyuki Kajiyama.

== Plot ==
After finding out that the media got wind of their latest car model's accident, car company Tiger Motors decides to get information on Yamato Motors' latest car model through corporate espionage. Asahina, a member of the Tiger's planning department, has his girlfriend Masako entertain Mawatari, head of Yamato's planning department and former colonel in the Manchukuo Imperial Army, in order to get information about Yamato's car model.

When the data Tiger collects is deemed inconclusive, head of Tiger's planning department Onoda pressures Yamato's chief of design into giving Tiger the specs of their car model, threatening to reveal to the police that he accepted a kickback. Mori agrees and gives Onoda the specs of the design of Yamato's new car model Mypet. To Tiger's shock, Yamato's Mypet design is similar to the Pioneer design. Nevertheless, director Oguri orders Tiger to start production on more Pioneer car models.

With the help of an interpreter and Masako, Tiger finds out about the price of Yamato's Mypet, and decides to set Pioneer's price to 990,000 yen. Getting information on Yamato through entertaining Mawatari causes a strain on Asahina and Masako's relationship however, and she leaves him.

Having long suspected that Oguri's nephew Shimamoto is a spy for Yamato, Onoda and Asahina interrogate him at his house, but he denies any involvement with Yamato. Through the lead of the nurse who checked up on the health of Tiger's president, Onoda finds out that Hiraki, son of one of Tiger's company founders, is a spy for Yamato Motors.

Hiraki reveals that he was forced into becoming a spy for Yamato Motors because Mawatari and Motoba, a Yamato spy who delivered information to Tiger, threatened to reveal to the public his affair with Katsuko, another Yamato spy, that he had the nurse spy for Yamato by bugging the hospital room of his father-in-law, the President of Tiger Motors, and that he delivered the first Pioneer to a man called Yoshino (who served in the Manchukuo Imperial Army under Mawatari's command), who intentionally wrecked the car by having it collide with the train and slander Tiger by claiming that it had broken after eighteen miles. Realizing that he was tricked into confessing what he did for Yamato and that his confession was secretly tape recorded by Onoda's team, Hiraki commits suicide.

Disgusted with Onoda's methods, Asahina resigns from Tiger. Sales of the Pioneer increase and Mawatari resigns from Yamato. Sometime later, Asahina has reconciled with Masako and now works as an employee at a small store. When a Pioneer passes by them, Masako remarks that it's a pretty car. Asahina replies that it's dirty and black as pitch.

== Cast ==
- Jirō Tamiya as Yutaka Asahina
- Junko Kanō as Masako Usami
- Eiji Funakoshi as Kimio Hiraki
- Reiko Shirai as Aiko Hiraki
- Hideo Takamatsu as Toru Onoda
- Sachiko Meguro as Hisako Onoda
- Ichiro Sugai as Hisashi Mawatari
- Toshiko Hasegawa as Katsuko Akimoto
- Kichijirō Ueda as Matoba
