= Kimie Shingyoji =

Japanese actress and model (born 1959)

- 真行寺 君枝
- Born: September 24, 1959 (age 66); Tokyo, Japan
- Occupations: Actress; Model
- Spouse: Hiroshi Oguchi (m. 1980; died 2009)

Kimie Shingyoji (真行寺 君枝, Shingyōji Kimie; born September 24, 1959 in Tokyo, Japan) is an actress and model in Japan. She has appeared in films Eureka, Station To Heaven, Natsumeke No Shokutaku, and Shark Skin Man and Peach Hip Girl.

In the 1980s she married Hiroshi Oguchi, a Tokyo scene celebrity, and drummer of bands The Tempters and Vodka Collins. Oguchi made a photographic essay of his wife in the book Made in Love in 1989.

== Filmography ==
=== Film ===
- The Resurrection of the Golden Wolf (1979)
- Shikake-nin Baian (1981)
- Shark Skin Man and Peach Hip Girl (1999)
- Eureka (2000)
- Tomorrow's Dinner Table (2021), Yukie Ishibashi

=== Television ===
- Hana Moyu (2015)
