= The Rape (film) =

- Film poster
- Directed by: Yōichi Higashi
- Screenplay by: Konomu Shinozaki; Yōichi Higashi
- Based on: Za reipu by Keiko Ochiai
- Produced by: Toru Yoshida; Rieko Zanma; Katsuhiro Maeda
- Starring: Yūko Tanaka; Morio Kazama; Masahiko Tsugawa; Takanori Goto; Hiroshi Kashiwagi
- Cinematography: Koichi Kawakami
- Edited by: Keiko Ichihara
- Music by: Michi Tanaka
- Production companies: Gentosha; Toei Company
- Distributed by: Toei Company
- Release date: May 15, 1982 (Japan)
- Running time: 100 minutes
- Country: Japan
- Language: Japanese
- Box office: ¥300 million

The Rape (Japanese: ザ・レイプ, Hepburn: Za reipu) is a 1982 Japanese drama film directed by Yōichi Higashi and co-written by Higashi with Konomu Shinozaki, based on a novel of the same name by Keiko Ochiai. It tells the story of a career woman (kyariaūman) who is raped. She sues her rapist, with the film focusing on the fallout of this decision. The film stars Yūko Tanaka in the lead role, in addition to Morio Kazama, Masahiko Tsugawa, Takanori Goto and Hiroshi Kashiwagi. Michi Tanaka composed the film's score, and it also features the insert song "Aozora, Hitorikiri" by Yōsui Inoue. The Rape was theatrically released by Toei Company on May 15, 1982, in Japan.

== Plot ==
The film is a socially conscious drama in which a rape victim tries to navigate the criminal justice system, while experiencing secondary victimization from her own defense attorney and changes in her relationship with her boyfriend.

Michiko Yahagi spends a passionate evening with her boyfriend Shogo. That night, on her way home, she is raped. The next day, Shogo notices something is wrong and questions her. She confesses that she has been raped by a man named Taniguchi, an acquaintance of the couple. Michiko wants to file a lawsuit against Taniguchi. Shogo is worried that this will "only hurt her more", but Michiko sticks to her guns and files a criminal complaint.

While preparing the report with a male detective at the police station, Michiko is troubled by the detective's insensitive remarks. Nonetheless, she ignores them for the sake of the trial. Eventually, Taniguchi is arrested and indicted, and the first day of the trial arrives. Taniguchi denies the rape, while Michiko becomes enraged when her lawyer asks her, "Didn't you take off your underwear of your own volition?" Furthermore, when Shogo takes the witness stand, his lawyer forces him to testify about their first date and whether or not she was a virgin, humiliating Michiko. Afterwards, Michiko spends time alone, immersing herself in her hobbies and desperately trying to heal herself.

In the subsequent days, her defense attorney reveals the existence of her ex-boyfriend, Saburo Takagi. Michiko is forced to candidly testify about her past relationship with Takagi. Nonetheless, with the support of those around her, Michiko regains her fortitude. Eventually, Taniguchi is convicted and sentenced for his crime. Michiko leaves the courtroom with a smile on her face.

== Cast ==
- Yūko Tanaka as Michiko Yahagi
- Morio Kazama as Shogo Ueda
- Masahiko Tsugawa as Saburo Takagi
- Takanori Goto as Yuichiro Kurose
- Hiroshi Kashiwagi as Chief Justice
- Hatsunori Hasegawa as Hiroshi Inoue
- Yoshio Hayashi
- Toshiya Ito as Akira Taniguchi
- Mariko Kaga as Owner of Patel
- Mayumi Nagisa as Owner of Jun
- Mayu Ito as Kyoko Karasawa, Prosecutor
- Ganjirō Nakamura II as Akiyama
- Sachiko Akagi as Junko, Sister
- Gen Kimura as Detective
- Mikio Shimizu as Detective
- Hiroshi Ito as Detective
- Toshio Tomonari as Detective
- Natsue Ishikawa as Michiko's Mother

== Background ==
The novel was first published by Shōsetsu Gendai, a Japanese literary magazine, in 1981. It was written by Keiko Ochiai, a Japanese feminist author. In the novel, Ochiai put forward the idea that women have the right to decide who they want to be intimate with – a radical idea at the time in Japan.

== Production ==
Toei producer Toru Yoshida had made many male-oriented films during the tenure of company president Shigeru Okada. However, when he saw director Higashi's film No More Easy Life (1979), he was deeply moved. He teamed up with Higashi's production company on his follow-up, Shiki Natsuko (1980), as well as The Rape. The film was co-produced by Rieko Zanma, a female producer who stated she would give advice "on how to portray women's psychology."

The Rape was greenlit in the wake of American films such as Looking for Mr. Goodbar, Annie Hall and An Unmarried Woman becoming popular among Japanese women. Films dealing with rape were also gaining prominence at the time, such as Good Luck, Miss Wyckoff.

The role of Shogo was initially offered to Toshiyuki Nagashima, who had worked with Higashi on Third Base. However, Nagashima turned it down, as he did not get along with the director.

Tanaka's rape scene was filmed in a vacant lot along a river in Mitaka, Tokyo. It took seven hours to film, with some sources claiming the scene was shot over the course of four days in total. It was shot late at night in the cold, requiring repeated retakes. By the end of this process, Tanaka was exhausted, saying, "I felt miserable, like I had really been violated."

== Release ==
The Rape was theatrically released by Toei Company on May 15, 1982, in Japan. It was released as a double feature with The Unspoiled Diamond, another Toei "women's film" directed by Toshiya Fujita. The film was later released to DVD by Toei Video on October 21, 2002.

Due to the influence of Ochiai's novel and the production of the film adaptation, rape scenes became more common on Japanese television throughout 1982.

== Awards and nominations ==
6th Japan Academy Awards

- Nominated: Outstanding Performance by an Actress in a Leading Role (Yūko Tanaka)
