= Kenichi Hagiwara =

Japanese actor and singer (1950–2019)

Ken'ichi Hagiwara
- 萩原健一
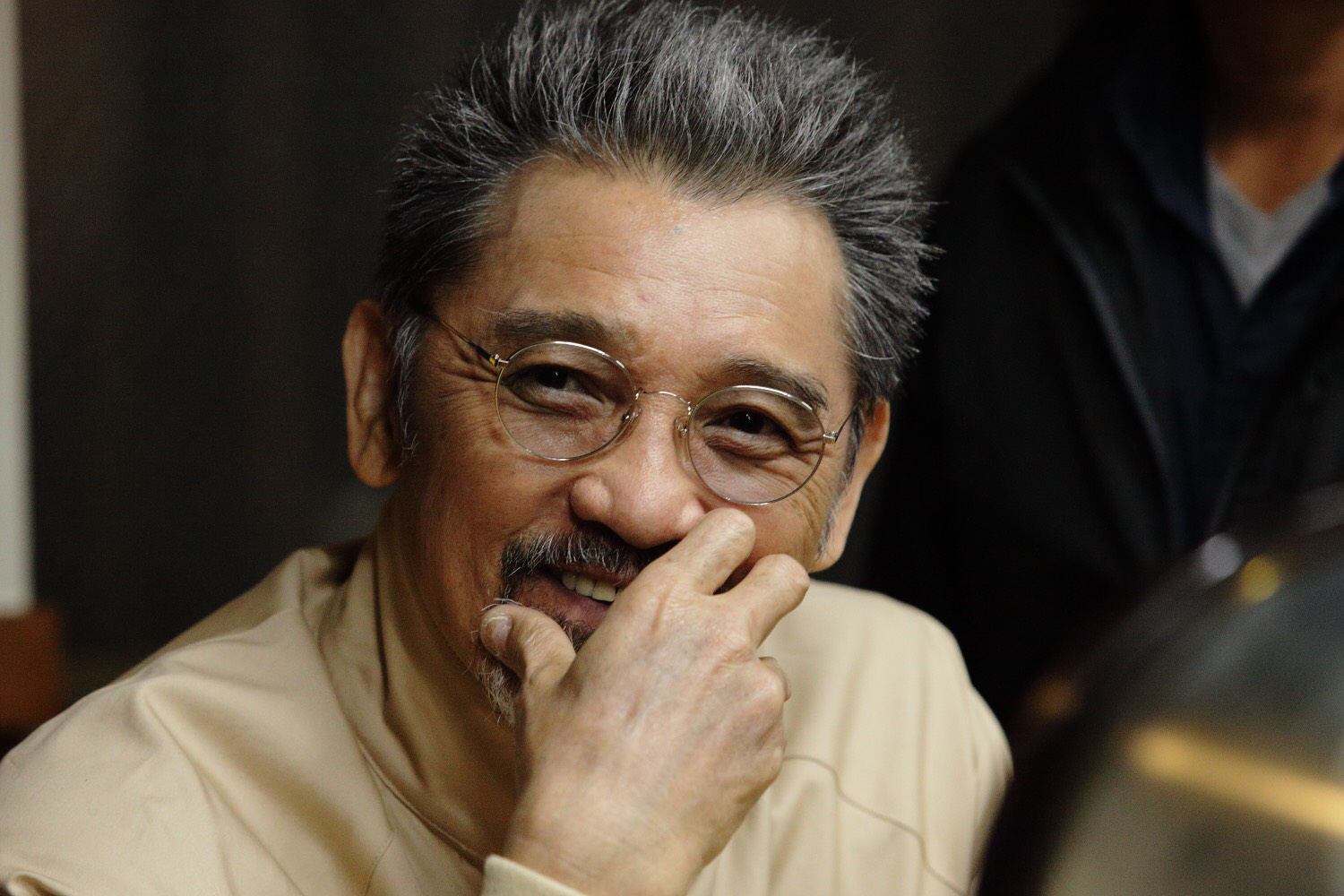
- Born: Keizō Hagiwara; 26 July 1950; Yono, Saitama, Japan
- Died: 26 March 2019 (aged 68); Tokyo, Japan
- Occupations: Actor, singer
- Years active: 1966–2019
- Height: 1.74 m (5 ft 8 1/2 in)
- Spouses: Hitomi Koizumi (m. 1975; div. 1978); Ayumi Ishida (m. 1980; div. 1984); Yuki (m. 1996; div. 2006); Rika Tomita (m. 2011)

Kenichi Hagiwara (萩原 健一, Hagiwara Ken'ichi; 26 July 1950 – 26 March 2019) was a Japanese singer and actor.

== Music career ==
Also known as Sho-Ken, he was the lead singer of The Tempters, which was a blues-rock band connected to the Group Sounds scene, and gained big hits in the late 1960s. Hagiwara was known for his good looks and wild vocals, which appealed to young male and female fans. After The Tempters, he formed the band PYG along with Kenji Sawada, the first true Japanese supergroup, a unit which included members of The Tigers, The Tempters, and The Spiders. He was in the Donjuan R&R Band with Hideki Ishima, formerly of The Flowers Travelln' Band.

== Acting career ==
After being highly praised for his acting in the film The Rendezvous (1972), he appeared in many films and television shows, including many films directed by Tatsumi Kumashiro and such hit TV dramas as Taiyō ni hoero!, Kizudarake no tenshi, and Zenryaku ofukurosama. He was still popular as an actor in the early 2000s.

== Death ==
On 26 March 2019, Hagiwara died of a gastrointestinal stromal tumor at the age of 68 in a hospital in Tokyo. He had been fighting the disease since 2011, but declined to publicize the name of the illness.

== Filmography ==
=== Film ===
Year	Title	Role	Notes
1969	Za temputazu	Kenichi Yamakawa (Shôken)	
1971	Kigeki: Inochi no nedan		
1972	The Rendezvous	Burglar	
1972	Niji wo watatte		
1973	The Wanderers	Mokutaro	
1973	Kaseki no mori		
1974	Seishun no satetsu	Kenichiro Eto	
1975	Two in the Amsterdam Rain	Akira Sakuda	
1975	Afurika no hikari	Jun	
1975	Yatsuhaka-mura	Tatsuya Terada	
1979	Sono go no jingi naki tatakai	Customer	
1980	Kagemusha	Takeda Katsuyori	
1981	Masho no natsu – 'Yotsuya kaidan' yori	Iemon Tamiya	
1982	To Trap a Kidnapper	Kazuo Furuya	Lead role
1983	Modori-gawa	Gakuyo Sonoda	
1985	Capone Cries a Lot	Umiemon	Lead role
1985	Seburi Monogatari	Hajime Kinoshita	Lead role
1985	Love Letter	Shoichi Takehara	Lead role
1986	Minami e Hashire, Umi no Michi o!	Ryuji Gondo	
1986	Rikon shinai onna	Keiichi Iwatani	
1987	Yogisha	Masahiko Tamura	
1987	The Man Who Assassinated Ryoma		
1989	Gokudo no onna-tachi: San-daime ane	Testuro Akamatsu	
1989	226	Shirō Nonaka	
1990	Gekido no 1750 nichi		
1991	Jutai	Rinzo Fuji, Father	
1992	The Triple Cross	Kanzaki	Lead role
1994	Ghost Pub	Sotaro	Lead role
1998	Joker	Murakoshi	
2001	Daburusu	Key	
2001	Desert Moon	Keechie's boss	
2009	Tajomaru	Ashikaga Yoshimasa	
2013	Natsuyasumi no chizu		

=== Television ===
Year	Film	Role	Notes
1973	Taiyō ni Hoero!	Jun "Macaroni" Hayami	6 episodes
1974	Katsu Kaishū	Okada Izo	Taiga drama
1999	Genroku Ryōran	Tokugawa Tsunayoshi	Taiga drama
2001	Fighting Girl	Yūzō Yoshida	
2002	Toshiie and Matsu	Akechi Mitsuhide	Taiga drama
2018	The Rootless Land	Shigeru Yoshida	
2019	Idaten	Takahashi Korekiyo	Taiga drama

== See also ==
- The Rolling Stones
- The Beatles
- Blues rock
- Rock music
- Blues
