= Katsuo Ohno =

Japanese musician and composer (born 1939)

- 大野克夫
- Born: September 12, 1939 (age 86); Kyoto, Japan
- Occupations: Composer, musician
- Years active: 1961–present

Katsuo Ohno (Japanese: 大野克夫, Hepburn: Katsuo Ōno; born September 12, 1939 in Kyoto) is a Japanese musician and composer who has scored multiple films and anime. His most notable works are theme music of detective drama Taiyō ni Hoero! and anime series Detective Conan.

As keyboardist, Ohno was a member of the group sounds band The Spiders from 1961 to 1970, and the rock supergroup Pyg from 1971 to 1972, which led to him becoming a member of the Takayuki Inoue Band and a backing instrumentalist for Kenji Sawada from 1972 to 1979.

== Filmography ==
Year	Title	Performance	Notes
1972–1986	Taiyō ni Hoero!		
1982	Yaju-deka	Composer	
1996–Present	Detective Conan	Composer & Musician	Main Theme
1991–2021	Shūchakueki Series		

== Music Department ==
Year	Title	Performance	Note
2013	Detective Conan: Private Eye in the Distant Sea	Musician	
2014	Detective Conan: Dimensional Sniper	Composer	Theme

== Soundtrack ==
Year	Title	Performance
1966	Seishun a Go-Go	music: "Little Roby
1982	The Mysterious Cities of Gold (TV Series)	music: "Itsuka Dokokade Anatani Atta", "Bouken Sha tashi" - as Katsuo Ono)

== Self ==
Year	Title	Work
1968	The spiders no dai-shingeki	Self
