= The Wanderers (1973 film) =

- Film poster
- Directed by: Kon Ichikawa
- Written by: Kon Ichikawa; Shuntarō Tanikawa
- Produced by: Kon Ichikawa
- Starring: Kenichi Hagiwara; Isao Bito; Ichiro Ogura
- Cinematography: Setsuo Kobayashi
- Edited by: Chizuko Osada; Saburobei Hirano
- Music by: Tei Kuriso; Yukio Asami
- Production companies: Art Theatre Guild; Kon Productions
- Distributed by: Art Theatre Guild
- Release date: April 7, 1973 (Japan)
- Running time: 100 minutes
- Country: Japan
- Language: Japanese

The Wanderers (Japanese: 股旅, Hepburn: Matatabi) is a 1973 feature-length Japanese film directed by Kon Ichikawa. It is set during the early nineteenth century in rural Japan.

== Premise ==
Set in feudal Japan; Genta, Shuita, and Mokutaro are three "toseinin", errant swordsmen for hire.

== Cast ==
- Kenichi Hagiwara as Mokutaro
- Isao Bito as Shuita
- Ichiro Ogura as Genta
- Reiko Inoue as Okumi
- Yoshi Katō as Masaku Matasaku
- Tadao Futami as Bangame
- Shō Natsuki as Juzo Ishizu
- Nagatoshi Sakamoto as Innkeeper
- Akiko Nomura as Oharu
- Akihisa Toda
- Seiichi Yoshida as Homeless person
- Shuichi Ito as Man with half sideburns
- Taro Jin as Heiemon
- Masamiki Kamo as Commoner
- Shimpachi Miyama as Hanbei
- Kenichi Kato
- Takehisa Yamaguchi
- Toshimitsu Omiya as Ankichi
- Fujio Tokita as Henchman
- Tomonori Yoshida as Yosuke

== Reception ==
A retrospective review states: "The Wanderers is a great film and one deserving more attention. It balances out being darkly funny and poignant with the world and characters it presents. The gritty, low-budget filmmaking mixed with some fine performances makes for a viewing experience that is disturbing yet bizarrely engaging."
