= Smile for Me (The Tigers song) =

Single by The Tigers
- B-side: "Rain Falls on the Lonely"
- Released: July 1969 (United Kingdom, Japan)
- Recorded: London, England
- Genre: Baroque pop, psychedelic pop, art rock
- Length: 3:11
- Label: Polydor
- Songwriter: Barry Gibb
- Producer: Biddu

The Tigers singles chronology
"Grief" (1969)	"Smile for Me" (1969)	"Now I Forgive You" (1969)

"Smile for Me" is a song composed by Barry Gibb in 1968 and made popular by the Tigers. It was produced by Biddu.

== Bee Gees/Barry Gibb version ==
"Smile for Me" was originally an outtake from Horizontal, but when Polydor introduced the Tigers to Gibb who delved into his bag of unreleased material and pulled out this track, Gibb was also commissioned to compose two songs for that group in an attempt at international success, and later it was re-written by Gibb with Maurice Gibb for the band.

Gibb recorded a solo demo of the song on 1968. He sang the lead vocals and played acoustic guitar. Though Gibb was the only Bee Gee performing on the record, it was leaked on YouTube on 22 October 2011 under Barry Gibb's name but the tone quality is not good.

== The Tigers version ==
"Smile for Me" was recorded in London with Barry Gibb's uncredited help and he is shown with the band on the picture sleeve. Gibb also made a cameo appearance in the movie Hi London!, which featured members of the band. The song was sung by Kenji Sawada. Since the band did not speak English, Biddu had to show them how to sing the English lyrics phonetically.

It was also released on The Tigers' album The Tigers' Beat. This song was arranged by John Fiddy and produced by Biddu. The single was released in the UK and Japan on Polydor. It was released as a single in July 1969, same month as Tin Tin released their single "Only Ladies Play Croquet" backed with "He Wants to Be a Star" on which Maurice Gibb produced. It reached #3 in Japan.

== Personnel ==
- Kenji Sawada — lead vocals
- Taro Morimoto — guitar
- Shiro Kishibe — guitar, tambourine
- Minoru Hitomi — drums
- Mie Nakao — chorus
- John Fiddy — orchestra and strings arrangement
