= Pyg (band) =

Japanese rock band

- Origin: Japan
- Genres: Rock
- Years active: 1971–1972
- Label: Polydor K.K.
- Past members: Kenji Sawada; Kenichi Hagiwara; Takayuki Inoue; Katsuo Ohno; Osami "Sally" Kishibe; Hiroshi Oguchi; Yuji Harada

Pyg (stylized as PYG) was a Japanese rock supergroup, composed of members from well-known bands of the group sounds era: The Spiders, The Tempters and The Tigers.

Formed in 1971, the band was a seven piece ensemble on stage. Fronted by two lead singers, Kenji Sawada of the Tigers and Kenichi Hagiwara of the Tempters, the musical director of Pyg was guitarist Takayuki Inoue of the Spiders. Inoue's Spiders bandmate Katsuo Ohno joined on keyboards, Hiroshi Oguchi of the Tempters provided drums, and Osami "Sally" Kishibe of the Tigers joined as bassist. Yuji Harada, formerly of Mickey Curtis & The Samurai, was also added to the line-up as second drummer.

The band released one studio album, Pyg! (1971), the live album Free with Pyg (1972), and five singles before dissolving.

== History ==
In December 1970, during the group sounds boom period (1966 - 1969), when they were at the height of their popularity, The Tigers announced their disbandment. Following this, The Tempters held their disbandment performance in a small hall within the Sankei Building in Ōtemachi, Tokyo. Additionally, The Spiders; another popular group sounds band, also announced their disbandment in the same month.

On January 11, 1971, in a traditional Japanese restaurant in Yotsuya, Tokyo, former members of The Tempters; Kenichi Hagiwara and Hiroshi Oguchi, former members of The Spiders; Katsuo Ohno and Takayuki Inoue, and from The Tigers; Osami "Sally" Kishibe and Kenji Sawada gathered. Previously without Sawada, the five had been discussing since the end of 1970 about forming a new rock band, influenced by what was already emerging as "New Rock" in Japan.

Meanwhile, from around the autumn of 1969, Watanabe Productions, to which The Tigers belonged, had been planning to promote Sawada as a solo singer and celebrity in the future. Within the band, Sawada was overtly favored, and the other members were treated coldly as a "backing band." However, Sawada stubbornly refused to become a solo singer and opposed the disbandment of The Tigers until the end. Sawada was determined to continue activities as a band, an attitude that would become his policy of working together with an exclusive band for years to come.

Kishibe then invited Sawada to join the "New Rock Band" project. He accepted, saying, "If Sally [Kishibe] is there, then I will be too." Watanabe Productions, considering keeping Sawada in the production as a top priority, agreed under the condition that the new band would belong to them, and established a subsidiary, "Watanabe Planning", to manage the new band and its members.

After naturally disbanding, Kenji Sawada turned to a full-fledged solo career, while Hagiwara released a solo EP before focusing on his acting activities. The rest of the members transitioned to the Takayuki Inoue Band.

== Discography ==
=== Singles ===
- 花・太陽・雨／やすらぎを求めて（1971.4.10）DR-1610
- 自由に歩いて愛して／淋しさをわかりかけた時（1971.7.21）DR-1633
- もどらない日々／何もない部屋（1971.11.1）DR-1649
- 遠いふるさとへ／おもいでの恋（1972.8.21）DR-1711
- 初めての涙／お前と俺（1972.11.21）DR-1731

=== Albums ===
- PYG!（1971.8.10）MR-5007
- FREE with PYG（1971.11.10）MR-9096
- GOLDEN☆BEST（2004.2.25）UPCY-9285
- スーパー・ベスト（2011.8.27）WMP-60057
