= Sugako Hashida =

Japanese screenwriter (1925–2021)

- Hashida Sugako
- Born: May 10, 1925; Keijō, Japanese Korea (present-day Seoul, South Korea)
- Died: April 4, 2021 (aged 95); Atami, Shizuoka, Japan
- Education: Waseda University
- Occupation: Scriptwriter
- Spouse: Hiroshi Iwasaki (m. 1965)
- Writing career
- Notable work: Oshin

Sugako Hashida (橋田 壽賀子, Hashida Sugako; May 10, 1925 – April 4, 2021) was a Japanese scriptwriter. She is known particularly for writing the NHK Asadora Oshin, and was considered Japan's most successful TV drama scriptwriter. She established Hashida Cultural Foundation. Her real name was Sugako Iwasaki (岩﨑 壽賀子, Iwasaki Sugako).

== Life ==
Hashida was born in Keijō (present-day Seoul) in 1925 while Korea was under Japanese rule. She moved to Sakai City in Japan with her mother while she was still young. Sugako began studying Japanese literature at Japan Women's College in Tokyo in 1942 but her education was interrupted by World War II. Although her family had lost its savings, she was able later to continue her education, transferring to the Department of Art at Waseda University. Hashida acknowledged that she discovered the work of Kikuchi Kan during her studies and these were a substantial influence on her later work. After completing her studies, she found work in the script department of Shochiku. She was laid off in 1960 but continued to write scripts on a freelance basis and supplemented her income by writing short stories for girls' magazines. In 1965, she married Hiroshi Iwasaki, a producer for the Tokyo Broadcasting System.

In 1973, she wrote the script for the television drama Ai to Shi o Mitsumete. This was followed by other successful scripts: the series Tonari no Shibafu (1976–77), Oshin (1983–84), Fūfu (1979), Michi (1980), Onnatachi no Chuushingura (1981) and Dakazoku (1983). An English-dubbed version of Tonari no Shibafu, The Grass Is Greener on the Other Side, was shown on American cable during the early 1980s.

Oshin, a serialised morning TV drama or asadora, was the first asadora to be both produced and written by women in Japan. Hashida is known particularly for writing Oshin, but she can be considered Japan's most successful TV drama script writer. Oshin was broadcast throughout Asia and became one of Japan's most famous television dramas. The series was developed from Hashida's original script.

== Awards ==
Hashida received the Broadcasting Culture Award, the Golden Arrow and the Most Distinguished Individual Achievement Award in 1979. Four years later she received the Cultural Achievement Award in Broadcasting and the Kikuchi Kan Award.

In 2020, she received the Order of Culture.
