= Mishima: A Life in Four Chapters =

1985 film by Paul Schrader

- Theatrical release poster
- Directed by: Paul Schrader
- Written by: Paul Schrader; Leonard Schrader
- Produced by: Mataichirô Yamamoto; Tom Luddy
- Starring: Ken Ogata; Kenji Sawada; Toshiyuki Nagashima; Yasosuke Bando
- Cinematography: John Bailey
- Edited by: Michael Chandler; Tomoyo Oshima (Note: Oshima is separately credited as a "Tokyo editor".)
- Music by: Philip Glass
- Production companies: Zoetrope Studios; Filmlink International; Lucasfilm Ltd.
- Distributed by: Warner Bros.
- Release dates: May 15, 1985 (Cannes); October 4, 1985 (US)
- Running time: 120 minutes
- Countries: United States; Japan
- Languages: English; Japanese
- Budget: $5 million
- Box office: $502,758

Mishima: A Life in Four Chapters is a 1985 biographical drama film directed by Paul Schrader from a screenplay he co-wrote with his brother Leonard. (Note: Additional writing contributions include Leonard Schrader's wife Chieko scribing the Japanese script; script research by Akiko Hitomi; and scenario conceived in collaboration with Jun Shiragi.) The film is based on the life and work of Japanese writer Yukio Mishima (portrayed by Ken Ogata), interweaving episodes from his life with dramatizations of segments from his books The Temple of the Golden Pavilion, Kyoko's House, and Runaway Horses. Francis Ford Coppola and George Lucas were executive producers of the film, which has a musical score composed by Philip Glass and production design by Eiko Ishioka.

The film's production met with controversy due to Mishima's status as an icon among Japanese ultranationalists, and the film's frank portrayal of his homosexuality. A planned premiere at the 1985 Tokyo International Film Festival was cancelled due to bomb threats, and the film was not officially screened in the country until 2025.

Mishima premiered at the 1985 Cannes Film Festival, where it won the Best Artistic Contribution Award and was nominated for Palme d'Or.

== Plot ==
The film begins on November 25, 1970, the last day of Mishima's life. He finishes a manuscript and then puts on a uniform he designed for himself and meets with four of his most loyal followers from his private army, the Tatenokai.

In flashbacks highlighting episodes from his past life, the viewer sees Mishima's progression from a sickly young boy to one of Japan's most acclaimed writers of the post-war era. In adulthood, Mishima trains himself into the acme of muscular discipline, owing to a morbid and militaristic obsession with masculinity and physical culture. His loathing for the materialism of modern Japan has him turn towards an extremist traditionalism. He establishes the Tatenokai and advocates for reinstating the emperor as head of government.

The biographical sections are interwoven with short dramatizations of three of Mishima's novels: In The Temple of the Golden Pavilion, a stuttering aspirant sets fire to the famous Zen Buddhist temple because he feels inferior at the sight of its beauty. Kyoko's House depicts the ultimately fatal sadomasochistic relationship between a middle-aged woman and her young lover, who is in her financial debt. In Runaway Horses, a group of young fanatic nationalists plots to overthrow the government and zaibatsu, with its leader subsequently committing suicide. Dramatizations, frame story, and flashbacks are segmented into the four chapters of the film's title, named Beauty, Art, Action, and Harmony of Pen and Sword.

The film culminates in Mishima and his followers taking hostage a General of the Japan Self-Defense Forces. He addresses the garrison's soldiers, asking them to join him in his struggle to reinstate the Emperor as the nation's sovereign. His speech is largely ignored and ridiculed. Mishima then returns to the General's office and commits seppuku.

== Cast ==
November 25, 1970

- Ken Ogata as Yukio Mishima
- Masayuki Shionoya as Masakatsu Morita
- Junkichi Orimoto as General Kanetoshi Mashita
- Hiroshi Mikami as Cadet #1
- Junya Fukuda as Cadet #2
- Shigeto Tachihara as Cadet #3

Flashbacks

- Naoko Otani as Shizue, the mother
- Haruko Kato as Natsuko, the grandmother
- Gō Rijū as Mishima, age 18–19
- Masato Aizawa as Mishima, age 9–14
- Yuki Kitazume as Dancing Friend
- Kyūzō Kobayashi as Literary Friend
- Alan Mark Poul as American Reporter

The Temple of the Golden Pavilion

- Yasosuke Bandō as Mizoguchi
- Kōichi Satō as Kashiwagi
- Hisako Manda as Mariko
- Chishū Ryū as Monk (uncredited)
- Naomi Oki as First Girl
- Miki Takakura as Second Girl
- Imari Tsuji as Madame

Kyoko's House

- Kenji Sawada as Osamu
- Reisen Lee as Kiyomi
- Setsuko Karasuma as Mitsuko
- Sachiko Hidari as Osamu's mother
- Tadanori Yokoo as Natsuo
- Yasuaki Kurata as Takei

Runaway Horses

- Toshiyuki Nagashima as Isao
- Hiroshi Katsuno as Lieutenant Hori
- Jun Negami as Kurahara
- Hiroki Ida as Izutsu
- Naoya Makoto as Kendo instructor
- Ryō Ikebe as Police interrogator

== Production ==
Pre-production began in February 1984. Cinematographer John Bailey instructed the Japanese crew to set up a screening of Hideo Gosha's film Goyokin as an important reference for the "look" of the film.

=== Casting ===
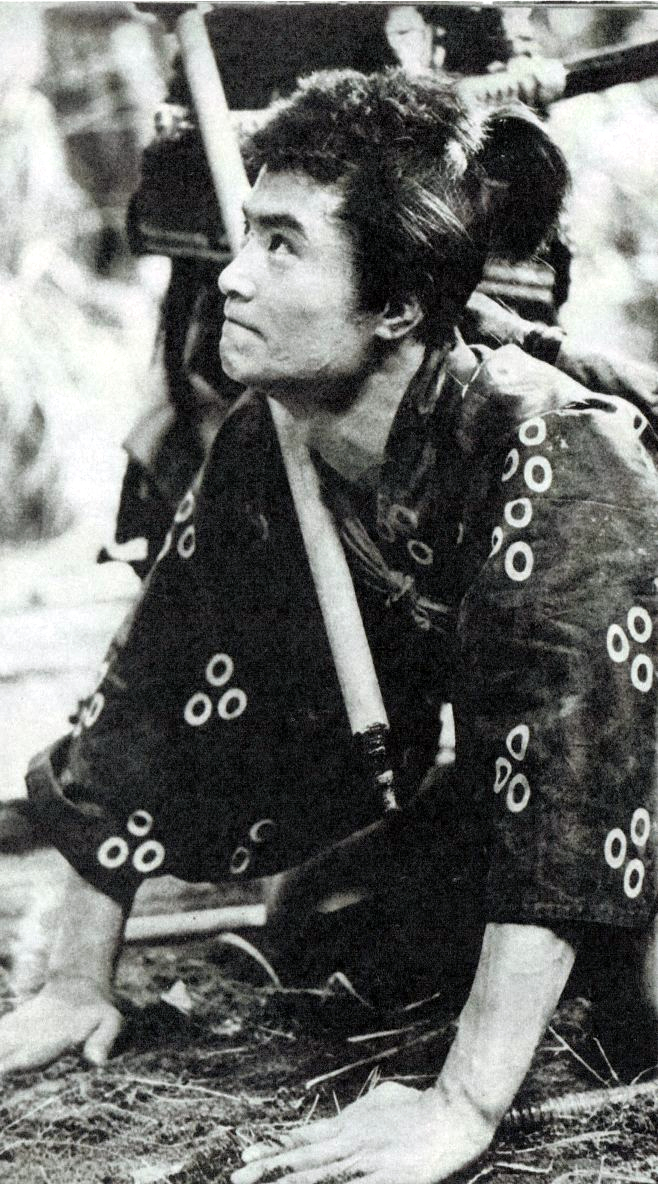
Ogata in 1965

The title role was originally intended for Ken Takakura, who indeed proposed this to Paul Schrader, but had to withdraw due to pressure from ultranationalist groups. Ryuichi Sakamoto was also considered for the part, but declined. Schrader eventually cast Ken Ogata, who he felt did not physically resemble Mishima, but could provoke sympathy for the character.

Roy Scheider was the narrator in the original movie version and on the early VHS release. On the 2001 DVD release, Scheider's voice-over was substituted with narration by an uncredited actor. The 2008 DVD re-release contains both Scheider's and the alternate narration (plus Ken Ogata's for the Japanese version). In a commentary on Amazon.com, Schrader explained this was a manufacturing error in 2001 and that the voice belonged to the photographer Paul Jasmin, and had been recorded as a temp track for Scheider.

=== Filming ===
Shooting took place entirely in Japan, at Toho Studios and at various locations in Tokyo and Kōriyama. The climactic depiction of the Mishima Incident was filmed at a Fukushima Prefectural Government building in Kōriyama, because it had a similar style of architecture to the real Camp Ichigaya building.

Because the crew was largely Japanese, Paul Schrader relied on four interpreters (including sister-in-law Chieko and producer Alan Poul) to direct.

=== Music ===
The musical score for Mishima was composed by Philip Glass, with parts performed by the Kronos Quartet. A soundtrack album was released on vinyl record and Audio CD in 1985 by Nonesuch Records.

== Structure and artistry ==
Mishima dramatizes three of the writer's novels and also uses segments from his novel Confessions of a Mask. At least two scenes, one showing the young Mishima being aroused by a painting of Saint Sebastian and another where he exaggerates his illness at a military health examination, appear in Confessions of a Mask.

The use of one further Mishima novel, Forbidden Colors, which describes the marriage of a homosexual man to a woman, was denied by Mishima's widow. As Schrader wanted to visualize a book illustrating Mishima's narcissism and sexual ambiguity, he chose the novel Kyoko's House (which he had translated for him exclusively) instead. Kyoko's House contains four storylines following different protagonists, but Schrader picked only the one which he considered most relevant.

Mishima used various colour palettes to differentiate between frame story, flashbacks and scenes from Mishima's novels: the scenes set in 1970 were shot in naturalistic colours, the flashbacks in black-and-white, the Temple of the Golden Pavilion-episode is dominated by golden and green, Kyoko's House by pink and grey, and Runaway Horses by orange and black.

The film closes with Mishima's suicide (which actually took longer than the seppuku ritual dictates). His confidant Morita, unable to behead Mishima, also failed in killing himself according to the ritual. A third group member beheaded both, then the conspirators surrendered without resistance. Roger Ebert approved of Schrader's decision not to show the suicide in bloody detail, which he thought would have destroyed the film's mood.

== Release ==
Under the title MISHIMA — November 25th, Clear Skies (Japanese: MISHIMA ――11月25日・快晴), the film was scheduled to premiere at the 1985 Tokyo International Film Festival. However, it was withdrawn and never officially released in Japan until 2025, mostly due to a boycott exercised by Mishima's widow and threats by right-wing groups opposed to Mishima's portrayal as a homosexual.

In an interview with Kevin Jackson published in 1992, Schrader commented on the fact that his film had still not been shown in Japan: "[Mishima] is too much of a scandal. ... When Mishima died people said, 'Give us fifteen years and we'll tell you what we think about him,' but it's been more than fifteen years now and they still don't know what to say. Mishima has become a non-subject."

The film was presented in Japanese Classics at the 38th Tokyo International Film Festival on October 30, 2025. It was the film's Japan premiere, 40 years after its first release. Paul Schrader appeared at a talk show before the film screening.

=== Home media ===
Mishima has been released three times on DVD in the US:

- The 2001 Warner Home Video release included a behind-the-scenes documentary, an audio commentary by Paul Schrader and a deleted scene. This edition did not, like the theatrical version, feature the narration of Roy Scheider but of an uncredited actor.
- The 2008 Criterion Collection release offered both English narrations by Roy Scheider and (according to Paul Schrader) Paul Jasmin from the 2001 release. Also, it featured new audio commentaries, video interviews with the film makers and experts on the writings of Mishima, plus The Strange Case of Yukio Mishima, a BBC documentary about the author.
- The 2018 Criterion Collection re-release on both DVD and Blu-Ray offered a new, restored 4K digital transfer of the director's cut, supervised and approved by director Paul Schrader and cinematographer John Bailey, with 2.0 surround DTS-HD Master Audio soundtrack. Existing features from the 2008 Criterion release were carried over with the addition of a new booklet featuring an essay by critic Kevin Jackson, a piece on the film's censorship in Japan, and photographs of Ishioka's sets.

A French DVD was released by Wild Side Video in 2010 titled Mishima – une vie en quatre chapitres in Japanese, English and French language with French subtitles.

A Spanish Blu-ray Disc was released in 2010 titled Mishima – Una Vida en Cuatro Capítulos. It features Schrader's narration with optional Spanish and Catalan, but no English subtitles.

== Reception ==
=== Critical response ===
On review aggregator website Rotten Tomatoes, Mishima has a 79% approval rating and an average rating of 7.5/10 based on 71 reviews. The website's critical consensus reads, "If Paul Schrader’s Yukio Mishima biopic omits too much to fully depict the author’s life, its passion shines through in its avant-garde structure, Eiko Ishioka’s production design, and Philip Glass’ thunderous score." Metacritic, which uses a weighted average, assigned the film a score of 84 out of 100, based on 15 critics, indicating "universal acclaim". In his 2013 movie guide, Leonard Maltin called the film an "ambitious, highly stylized drama", later adding that it is "long, difficult, not always successful, but fascinating." In 2007, Roger Ebert added the film to his "Great Movies" list, calling the film "a triumph of concise writing and construction" in which "the unconventional structure...unfolds with perfect clarity, the logic revealing itself."

Chris Peachment of Time Out said: "Schrader may have finally achieved the violent transfiguration that he seeks along with his protagonists; the film has all the ritual sharpness and beauty of that final sword. ... There is nothing quite like it."

In 1990, Schrader said he considered Mishima to be the best film he had directed: "It's the one I'd stand by – as a screenwriter it's Taxi Driver, but as a director it's Mishima."

=== Awards ===
The film premiered at the 1985 Cannes Film Festival on May 15, 1985, where it won the award for Best Artistic Contribution.

== See also ==
- 11:25 The Day He Chose His Own Fate, a 2012 Japanese film by Kōji Wakamatsu about Mishima's last months and death.
- Exquisite Nothingness: The Novels of Yukio Mishima by David Vernon (Endellion, 2025, ISBN 978-1739136130).
