= Kenji Sawada =

Japanese singer, songwriter and actor (born 1948)

- Also known as: Julie
- Born: June 25, 1948 (age 77); Tsunoi, Iwami (present: Tsunoi, Tottori), Tottori Prefecture, Japan
- Origin: Sakyo-ku, Kyoto, Japan
- Genres: Rock, pop, glam rock, adult contemporary
- Occupations: Singer, composer, lyricist, actor
- Years active: 1967–present
- Labels: Polydor Japan, Toshiba EMI/Eastworld, Julie Label
- Website: Official

Kenji Sawada (Japanese: 沢田 研二, Hepburn: Sawada Kenji; born June 25, 1948; real surname written as 澤田) is a Japanese singer, songwriter and actor, best known as vocalist of the rock band The Tigers. Nicknamed "Julie" (ジュリー, Jurī) because of his self-professed adoration of Julie Andrews, he was born in Tsunoi, Iwami, Japan (now part of Tottori), and raised in Sakyo-ku, Kyoto from the age of age 3.

As a singer, songwriter and actor, Sawada prospered greatly in Japanese popular culture in the last three decades of the Shōwa era. At the end of the 1960s, he had great success as the lead singer of the band The Tigers. After the breakup of The Tigers and another project Pyg, he began his own solo career. Sawada has sold over 15.55 million records.

== Music career ==
Sawada was the lead singer of the best-known J-pop music act of the late 1960s Group Sounds era band The Tigers. A national teen idol, his nickname is Julie. Japanese pop stars of that era often adopted nicknames, particularly often English-language girls' names. His nickname is derived from the actress Julie Andrews as he is a fan of hers. The group was signed by Watanabe Productions.

In 1968, Barry Gibb of the Bee Gees was commissioned to compose two songs for the band in an attempt at international success. One of the songs was a hit in Japan, titled "Smile for Me" and sung by Sawada. In spite of his clear English pronunciation, the record did not make the pop charts in foreign markets as the Watanabe Productions management team had hoped. The band disbanded shortly after its release.

In 1970, after The Tigers broke up, Sawada formed the supergroup, Pyg. Kenichi Hagiwara, Sawada's main rival in the Group Sounds era, was a co-lead vocalist. When Pyg disbanded, Sawada went solo, but acting was to be his main form of artistic expression after that. Sawada started to wear trendy clothes and make-up in the 1970s, and became regarded as an influential fashion innovator.

In the 1980s he was in Co-Colo with Hideki Ishima.

Sawada also plays the shamisen. He appeared on the cover of Rolling Stone in March 1969 (No. 28), and is the only Japanese as a cover person of this magazine other than Yoko Ono.

== Film career ==
Sawada's best-known roles include playing in Paul Schrader's biographical film movie about Yukio Mishima, Mishima: A Life in Four Chapters and playing in Takashi Miike's horror-comedy musical The Happiness of the Katakuris.

== Personal life ==
He married Emi Ito, a member of the 1960s pop duo The Peanuts, in 1975, but they divorced in 1987. He has been married to Oshin star Yūko Tanaka since 1989, whom he met on the set of Tora-san, the Expert.

== Awards ==
- 1972, 14th Japan Record Awards, Vocal Award
- 1973, 15th Japan Record Awards, Popular prize
- 1974, 16th Japan Record Awards, Vocal Award
- 1977, 19th Japan Record Awards, Grand Prix
- 1978, 20th Japan Record Awards, Best Award & Gold Award
- 1979, 21st Japan Record Awards, Gold Award
- 1980, 22nd Japan Record Awards, Gold Award
- 1981, 23rd Japan Record Awards, Gold Award
- 1982, 24th Japan Record Awards, Gold Award & Planing Award
- 1982, 25th Japan Record Awards, Special Gold Award
- 2023, 77th Mainichi Film Awards, Best Actor

== Partial filmography ==
=== Film ===
- Statue in Fire (1974)
- Que C'est Triste Paris (1976)
- Taiyō o Nusunda Otoko (1979)
- Samurai Reincarnation (1981), Amakusa Shirō
- Tora-san, the Expert (1982)
- Capone Cries a Lot (1985)
- Mishima: A Life in Four Chapters (1985)
- Hiruko the Goblin (1990)
- Boku to, bokura no natsu (1990)
- Yumeji (1991, Yumeji Takehisa
- Osaka Story (1999)
- Pistol Opera (2001)
- The Happiness of the Katakuris (2002)
- It's a Flickering Life (2021), Satonao "Gō" Maruyama
- The Zen Diary (2022), Tsutomu

=== Television ===
- Sanga Moyu (1984), Charlie Tamiya
- Hanekonma (1986), Takeshi Matsunami

=== Japanese dub ===
- West Side Story (1979, TBS dub), Bernardo Nuñez (George Chakiris)

== See also ==
- List of best-selling music artists in Japan
