= The Rendezvous (1972 film) =

1972 film

- Theatrical release poster
- Directed by: Kōichi Saitō
- Written by: Shiro Ishimori
- Produced by: Kiyoshi Higuchi
- Starring: Keiko Kishi; Kenichi Hagiwara; Yoshie Minami; Rentarō Mikuni; Taiji Tonoyama
- Cinematography: Noritaka Sakamoto
- Music by: Hiroshi Miyagawa
- Production company: Shochiku
- Release date: 29 March 1972
- Running time: 87 minutes
- Country: Japan
- Language: Japanese

The Rendezvous (約束, Yakusoku) is a 1972 Japanese film directed by Kōichi Saitō. It was written by Shiro Ishimori and entered into the 22nd Berlin International Film Festival.

== Plot summary ==
The movie is about a brief love story of a young man and a woman who meet, fall in love and part during the course of a train ride.

== Cast ==
- Keiko Kishi as Woman on Parole
- Kenichi Hagiwara as Burglar
- Yoshie Minami as Supervisor
- Rentarō Mikuni as Detective
- Jin Nakayama
- Taiji Tonoyama
