= Miki Takakura =

Japanese gravure idol and pink film actress

- Born: Miki Koshizawa; December 14, 1960 (age 65); Kanazawa, Ishikawa, Japan
- Years active: 1983–1995

Miki Takakura (高倉 美貴, Takakura Miki) (born Miki Koshizawa (越沢 美貴, Koshizawa Miki) on December 14, 1960 in Kanazawa, Ishikawa) is a Japanese gravure idol and pink film actress who was active in the 1980s and rose to prominence as Nikkatsu's "SM Queen" (SMの女王, SM no joō) from 1983 to 1985.

== Life and career ==
=== Nikkatsu ===
When famed Nikkatsu S&M actress Naomi Tani retired in 1979, the studio tried a number of replacements for her including starlet Takakura who was next in line after Nami Matsukawa. Takakura began her career at Nikkatsu with the August 1983 Beauty in Rope Hell, part of Nikkatsu's Roman Porno series, written by noted S&M author Oniroku Dan and directed by Genji Nakamura. Some moviegoers complained that Takakura was too thin for bondage work because the ropes didn't make enough of a visible impression, but pink film critics Thomas and Yuko Weisser cite her as one of the best S&M actresses. However, by this time Nikkatsu was at a low point and would close its doors in a few years, and the S&M genre films which had supported the studio for a number of years were becoming formulaic and trite.

Takakura retired from the pink film scene after starring in five Roman Porno films written by Oniroku Dan, her final movie for Nikkatsu being the January 1985 Double Rope Torture to which the Weissers give only a one-star rating, calling the film a "stillborn project".

=== After Nikkatsu ===
Takakura later pursued a film and TV career, becoming one of the rare Roman Porno actresses (such as Terumi Azuma and Junko Asahina) who were successful in mainstream media. She had a role in the February 1985 mainstream comedy Capone Cries a Lot, directed by Seijun Suzuki who had also started his career at Nikkatsu (but in the pre-Roman Porno era). Takakura also had a small part in Paul Schrader's 1985 biographical drama film Mishima: A Life in Four Chapters as the second girl in "The Temple of the Golden Pavilion" segment. In 1987, she appeared in the second of the long series of Yakuza Wives gangster films from Toei. She also had a role as a novelist in the June 1995 comedy Tenshi no wakemae.

Takakura released a 96-page nude photobook in December 1993 titled South Fairy Tale photographed by Kenji Ishiguro and published by Scola.

She married tarento Nobuo Harada in 1995.

Four of Oniroku Dan’s stories, originally published in Japanese in 1997, were published in English in 2010 by Vertical, Inc. The collection of these stories is titled Season of Infidelity; the collection’s last story, "Bewitching Bloom", is a telling of Dan’s relationship with Naomi Tani, and also includes notes about three subsequent Nikkatsu "Queens"; Takakura, Izumi Shima, and Junko Mabuki.

== Filmography ==
=== Nikkatsu ===
- Beauty in Rope Hell (団鬼六 美女縄地獄), Genji Nakamura (1983)
- Beauty Rope Cosmetology (団鬼六 美女縄化粧), Katsuhiko Fujii (1983)
- Nun in Rope Hell (団鬼六 修道女縄地獄), Katsuhiko Fujii (1984)
- Rope Torture (団鬼六 縄責め) Ikuo Sekimoto (1984)
- Double Rope Torture (団鬼六 緊縛卍責め), Ikuo Sekimoto (1985)

=== Other films ===
- Capone Cries a Lot, Seijun Suzuki (1985)
- Bakumatsu Seishun Graffiti: Ronin Sakamoto Ryoma (幕末青春グラフィティ Ｒｏｎｉｎ 坂本竜馬), Yoshitaka Kawai (1986)
- Yakuza Wives II (極道の妻たちII, Gokudō no Onna-tachi Tsu), Tōru Dobashi (1987)
- Tenshi no Wakemae (天使のわけまえ), Jinsei Tsuji (1995)
