= Tora-san, the Expert =

- Theatrical poster
- Directed by: Yoji Yamada
- Written by: Yoji Yamada; Yoshitaka Asama
- Starring: Kiyoshi Atsumi; Yūko Tanaka
- Cinematography: Tetsuo Takaba
- Edited by: Iwao Ishii
- Music by: Naozumi Yamamoto
- Distributed by: Shochiku
- Release date: December 28, 1982
- Running time: 106 minutes
- Country: Japan
- Language: Japanese

Tora-san, the Expert (男はつらいよ 花も嵐も寅次郎, Otoko wa Tsurai yo: Hana mo Arashi mo Torajirō) is a 1982 Japanese comedy film directed by Yoji Yamada. It stars Kiyoshi Atsumi as Torajirō Kuruma (Tora-san), and Yūko Tanaka as his love interest or "Madonna". Tora-san, the Expert is the thirtieth entry in the popular, long-running Otoko wa Tsurai yo series. This became the first Tora-san film to be released on DVD with English subtitles in 16:9 ratio when the Hong Kong label Panorama did so in 2006.

== Synopsis ==
Tora-san gets into an argument with his uncle and sets out on the road again. In Kyushu he meets a young woman named Keiko and the shy zoologist Saburō, and attempts to play matchmaker between the two when they all return to Tokyo.

== Cast ==
- Kiyoshi Atsumi as Torajirō
- Chieko Baisho as Sakura
- Yūko Tanaka as Keiko
- Kenji Sawada as Saburō
- Masami Shimojō as Kuruma Tatsuzō
- Chieko Misaki as Tsune Kuruma (Torajiro's aunt)
- Gin Maeda as Hiroshi Suwa
- Hisao Dazai as Boss (Umetarō Katsura)
- Gajirō Satō as Genkō
- Hidetaka Yoshioka as Mitsuo Suwa
- Asao Utada as Katsuzō Muta
- Miyuki Kojima as Yukari Nomura
- Haruko Mabuchi as Kinuko

== Production ==
During the filming, Tanaka and Sawada had an affair despite his marriage to Emi Ito.

Several scenes within the film were shot on location at and near Yunohira, an onsen village that continues to celebrate their inclusion in the movie to this day.

== Critical appraisal ==
Kiyoshi Atsumi, the star of the Otoko wa Tsurai yo series won the Best Actor prize at the Blue Ribbon Awards for his role in Tora-san, the Expert. Co-star Yūko Tanaka was nominated for Best Actress at the Japan Academy Prize. The casting of Kenji Sawada, then one of Japan's most flamboyant rock stars, as the painfully shy Saburo, also drew attention.

Stuart Galbraith IV judges this film to be one of the best in the series, helped by Tanaka's outstanding performance. The German-language site molodezhnaja gives Tora-san, the Expert three and a half out of five stars.

== Availability ==
Tora-san, the Expert was released theatrically on December 28, 1982. In Japan, the film was released on videotape in 1986 and 1996, and in DVD format in 2005 and 2008.

== Bibliography ==
=== English ===
- "OTOKO WA TSURAI YO HANA MO ARASHI MO TORAJIRO (1982)". British Film Institute. Archived from the original on 2012-10-17.
- "OTOKO WA TSURAIYO -HANA MO ARASHI MO TORAJIRO". Complete Index to World Film.
- Otoko wa tsurai yo: Hana mo arashi mo Torajirô (1982) at IMDb
- Galbraith IV, Stuart (2007-01-01). "Tora-san 30: Tora-san, the Expert (Region 3)". DVD Talk.

=== German ===
- "Tora-San, the Expert" (in German). www.molodezhnaja.ch.

=== Japanese ===
- 男はつらいよ 花も嵐も寅次郎 (1982) (in Japanese). allcinema.net.
- "男はつらいよ 花も嵐も寅次郎". Japanese Cinema Database (Agency for Cultural Affairs). Archived from the original on 2012-03-11.
- 男はつらいよ 花も嵐も寅次郎 (in Japanese). Japanese Movie Database.
- 男はつらいよ 花も嵐も寅次郎 (in Japanese). Kinema Junpo. Archived from the original on 2012-03-09.
