= Yūko Tanaka =

Japanese actress (born 1955)

- 田中 裕子
- Born: April 29, 1955 (age 71); Ikeda, Osaka Prefecture, Japan
- Occupation: Actress
- Years active: 1979–present
- Spouse: Kenji Sawada (m. 1989)
- Relatives: Ryuzo Tanaka (brother)

Yūko Tanaka (田中 裕子, Tanaka Yūko; born April 29, 1955) is a Japanese actress from Osaka Prefecture, Japan. She has won several acting awards during a long career working in both film and television, after she graduated from Meiji University.

== Life and career ==
=== Early career ===
At the beginning of her career in 1979, Tanaka had a leading role in the NHK TV drama series Sister Ma (マー姉ちゃん, Ma Nee-chan) and she also voiced the role of Judy in the Fuji Television anime movie Daddy-Long-Legs (あしながおじさん), based on the novel by Jean Webster, which was broadcast in October 1979. Tanaka appeared in her first theatrical film in 1981, the historical drama Eijanaika and later that year she starred in Edo Porn, a fictional biography of the artist Hokusai. Tanaka received a number of accolades for her work in these two films including Best Supporting Actress and one of the Best Newcomer of the Year awards from the Japan Academy. She also won the Blue Ribbon Award for Best Supporting Actress as well as the Hochi Film Award for Best Supporting Actress. Tanaka returned to television drama in late 1981 with the Tokyo Broadcasting System (TBS) series Making Memories (想い出つくり, Omoide zukuri) about three office ladies (OL) reaching their 25th birthdays. The series, which also starred Masako Mori and Yūko Kotegawa, ran from September to December 1981.

In May 1982, Tanaka starred in the film The Rape (ザ・レイプ, Za reipu) directed by Yōichi Higashi, a role which earned her a nomination for Best Actress from the Japan Academy. Later that year, Tanaka played "Keiko", the love interest of Torajirō (Tora-san), in the comedy, Tora-san, the Expert, part of a long running series of films. In early 1983, Tanaka played the part of a prostitute in the murder mystery Amagi Pass (天城越え, Amagi goe) with Tsunehiko Watase. Reviewer Kevin Thomas at the Los Angeles Times called Tanaka "So gorgeous and talented" that the film "becomes something extraordinary." For her part in the film she won both the Blue Ribbon Award and the Kinema Junpo award for Best Actress.

=== Oshin and afterwards ===
As part of the celebration of their 30th anniversary in 1983, the Japanese TV network NHK inaugurated a new NHK Serial TV Novel titled Oshin (おしん). The serial told the story of a peasant girl, Oshin, born in 1900, who endures poverty and mistreatment but in later life finds success and happiness. Oshin as a young girl was played by Ayako Kobayashi but Tanaka took over the role as the adult Oshin. The series ran in almost 300 fifteen-minute episodes broadcast from April 1983 to March 1984 and its peak rating (62.9%) made it "the most popular drama in Japanese TV history". The series was also popular outside Japan and Tanaka became a "household name" in China in the 1980s.

After Oshin, Tanaka returned to feature films with starring roles in the comedy Capone Cries a Lot which was distributed by Shochiku in February 1985, and in the August 1985 drama Demon (夜叉, Yasha) opposite Ken Takakura. Tanaka received a nomination for Best Supporting Actress from the Japan Academy for the two films.

Over the next ten years, Tanaka mostly worked in television, appearing in a dozen TV movies and in the lavish NHK historical series chronicling the period of the Meiji Restoration, As If In Flight (翔ぶが如く, Tobu ga Gotoku), which ran in 48 episodes from January to December 1990. During this period, Tanaka also appeared in two films, one of them the July 1987 sentimental drama about a teacher, Children on the Island aka 24 Eyes (二十四の瞳, Nijuyon no Hitomi). Kevin Thomas at the Los Angeles Times called her "exquisite in her portrayal". In May 1988, Tanaka starred as Kino (Catherine in the novel) in Wuthering Heights, director Yoshishige Yoshida's film adaptation of the classic Emily Brontë novel set in medieval Japan.

== Personal life ==
Tanaka met singer and actor Kenji Sawada when they were both in the 1982 film Tora-san, the Expert and they also appeared together in the 1985 movie Capone Cries a Lot. Sawada at the time was married to singer Emi Īto but they separated in 1986 and were divorced in 1987. Tanaka and Sawada married in November 1989.

== Later career ==
When director Yōji Yamada reworked a script from his popular Otoko wa Tsurai yo film series after the death of "Tora-san" star Kiyoshi Atsumi as Niji wo Tsukamu Otoko (虹をつかむ男) in December 1996, Tanaka, who had earlier worked with Yamada in Tora-san, the Expert, was chosen to play the true love of a manager of a failing movie theater (Toshiyuki Nishida). In July 1997, Tanaka provided the voice of Lady Eboshi in the anime fantasy Princess Mononoke and in the 1999 Osaka Story (大阪物語, Ōsaka monogatari), Tanaka played one half of a manzai comedy duo whose failing marriage affects their daughter Wakana (Ikewaki Chizuru).

Tanaka continued performing in both film and television roles throughout the 2000s including starring with Ken Takakura in the 2001 Yasuo Furuhata drama, The Firefly (ホタル, Hotaru), about Japanese families after World War II. The film was nominated for 13 awards by the Japan Academy including a Best Actress nomination for Tanaka. In the January 2005 film Hibi (火火), Tanaka took on the role of real life ceramic artist Kiyoko Koyama. When her son was diagnosed with leukemia, Kiyoko worked to form a patients' group for bone marrow transplants, and she was instrumental in the formation of the Japan Marrow Donor Program (JMDP). The film was directed by Banmei Takahashi who is better known for his early work in pink film. The movie brought Tanaka both the Hochi Film Award and the Kinema Junpo Award for Best Actress.

Tanaka's next film role was a fifty-year-old single woman who meets an old flame while delivering milk in the July 2005 romantic drama The Milkwoman (いつか読書する日, Itsuka dokusho suruhi). She won a Best Actress Award for her roles in this film and Hibi at the 2006 Japanese Professional Movie Awards. Tanaka voiced the character of the wizard Cob (クモ) in the July 2006 anime movie Tales from Earthsea which was also released in an English language version in the United States in August 2010.

Tanaka returned to television drama starring as the Empress Dowager Cixi in the NHK historical drama The Pleiades (蒼穹の昴, Sokyu no Subaru). The Sino-Japanese production ran in 28 episodes in Japan from January to July 2010 and in China from March 2010, with both versions receiving excellent ratings. She also reunited with previous co-star Ken Takakura in Yasuo Furuhata's film Anata e aka Dearest (あなたへ) in August 2012. The next year she took the part of Keisuke Kinoshita's mother in the June 2013 Dawn of a Filmmaker: The Keisuke Kinoshita Story, a drama based on the life of the famous Japanese film director, and she also played a leading role in Shinji Aoyama's The Backwater (共喰い, Tomogui) in September 2013.

== Filmography ==
=== Films ===
Year	Title	Role	Notes	Ref.
1981	Eijanaika	Omatsu		
1981	Edo Porn	Oei		
1982	The Rape	Michiko Yahagi	Leading role	
1982	Tora-san, the Expert	Keiko		
1983	Amagi Pass	Hana Ōtsuka	Leading role	
1985	Capone Cries a Lot		Leading role	
1985	Demon			
1987	Children on the Island		Leading role	
1988	Wuthering Heights	Kinu	Leading role	
1996	Niji wo Tsukamu Otoko	Yaeko		
1997	Princess Mononoke	Lady Eboshi (voice)		
1999	Osaka Story	Harumi		
1999	Ojuken			
2000	Zawa-zawa Shimokita-zawa			
2001	The Firefly			
2002	Pi-Pi kyodai			
2005	Hibi	Kiyoko Kōyama	Leading role	
2005	The Buried Forest			
2005	The Milkwoman	Minako Ōba	Leading role	
2006	Tales from Earthsea	Cob (voice)		
2008	The Homeless Student	Michiyo Kawai		
2010	Haru's Journey			
2012	Dearest			
2013	Dawn of a Filmmaker: The Keisuke Kinoshita Story	Tama Kinoshita		
2013	The Backwater			
2014	Homeland	Tomiko		
2015	Midnight Diner	Machiko		
2019	The Island of Cats	Yoshie		
2019	One Night	Koharu		
2020	Ora, Ora Be Goin' Alone	Momoko	Leading role	
2021	Gift of Fire			
2022	The Unnameable Dance	Narrator	Documentary	
2022	Thousand and One Nights	Tomiko Wakamatsu	Leading role	
2023	Monster	Fushimi		
2024	The Real You	Akiko Ishikawa		
2026	Children Untold	Kei Yamai		

=== TV dramas ===
Year	Title	Role	Notes	Ref.
1981	Omoide Zukuri	Kaori		
1983–1984	Oshin	Oshin	Leading role; Asadora	
1990	Tobu ga Gotoku	Saigō Ito	Taiga drama	
2008	Bōshi			
2010	Mother	Hana Mochizuki		
2010	The Firmament of the Pleiades	Empress Dowager Cixi	Leading role	
2013	Woman: My Life for My Children	Sachi Uesugi		
2015	Mare	Fumi Okesaku	Asadora	
2016	Kono Machi no Inochi ni	Ayako	Television film	
2017	Ties: A Miraculous Colt	Kayoko Matsushita	Television film	
2018	Anone	Anone Hayashida		
2019	Natsuzora: Natsu's Sky	Hideko Takahashi	Asadora	
2020	Taiyō no Ko		Television film	
2022	Love with a Case	Azuki Koarai		

=== TV anime ===
Year	Title	Role	Notes	Ref.
1979	Daddy-Long-Legs	Judy	Television film	

== Honours ==
- Medal with Purple Ribbon (2010)
- Kinuyo Tanaka Award (2021)
