= Hiroshi Oguchi =

Japanese conceptual artist, musician and scene maker (1950–2009)

Hiroshi Oguchi (大口 広司, Ōguchi Hiroshi, sometimes spelled as Ohguchi) was born in Kawaguchi, Japan, on November 28, 1950. He died on January 25, 2009, in Tokyo, Japan, of cancer.

A Tokyo-based conceptual artist, musician and scene maker, Hiroshi Oguchi had for decades been influential in the changing attitudes of Japan's youth. As a drummer, he was in the bands The Tempters, Pyg, and Vodka Collins, recording many albums. He also owned and ran his own fashion company, Practice of Silence. Oguchi was also an actor in a number of films, including Strange Circus (2006), Freesia :Icy Tears (2006),The Sinking Of Japan (2006) and Silk (2007). He was married to the popular actress Kimie Shingyoji; they had one son, Gento Oguchi, who is a musician and artist.
