= The Tempters =

The Tempters were part of Japan's Group Sounds pop music era in the 1960s.

Featuring lead vocalist Kenichi Hagiwara, who was also known by the nickname of Shoken, they rivaled The Tigers for the top spot in the Japan rock scene hierarchy. The band also featured drummer Hiroshi Oguchi, who later formed the glam rock band Vodka Collins.

Band members- Keizo "Kenichi" Hagiwara (vocals, harmonica), Yoshiharu Matsuzaki (lead guitar, vocals), Toshio Tanaka (rhythm guitar, organ), Takaku Noburo (bass), Hiroshi Oguchi (drums).

"Emerald - No Densetsu" ("Legend of the Emerald"), was released by the band in July 1968 and was number one for two weeks in Japan, and in the Top 10 for 13 weeks, selling over one million copies.

Both Oguchi and Hagiwara would go on to become successful actors.
