= Keiko Ochiai =

Keiko Ochiai (1945 (age 80–81)) is a Japanese author, bookstore owner, radio personality and feminist.

== Biography ==
She was born in Tokyo out-of-wedlock to parents who encouraged her to develop hobbies considered "unusual" for a girl, including carpentry. While at Meiji University, she joined the English Speaking Society and became its first female officer. She graduated in 1967.

Ochiai was a radio celebrity in the 1970s and often DJ-ed under the name "Lemon-chan". She gained popularity through her novel advice show, in which listeners could call in and describe their problems in order to receive her advice in real time. She has also written about jazz.

She published a widely-acclaimed series of essays about women in Japanese cities titled A Spoonful of Happiness (Suppun Ippai no Shiawase) based on her newspaper columns. In 1982, she wrote The Rape (Za reipu), about the lawsuit of the rape of an independent young career woman (kyariaūman) by her ex-boyfriend. In the novel, Ochiai establishes that women have the right to decide with whom they decide to be intimate — a radical idea at the time in Japan. She also introduces the phrase "penis fascism" to describe male obsession with sexual dominance.

In 1994, she published The Second Rape, still untranslated into English. A 2017 article stated that she had published over 130 books and essays.

In 1976, she founded a children's bookstore named "Crayonhouse" (or "Crayon House") in Tokyo. According to its website, the store looks at culture from the point of view of children and of women, with a special focus on vegetarianism and organic products. She has said that it was founded based on "my belief that a society that is kind to children, that thinks about the happiness of future generations, is a society where anyone can live happily".

Since the 1970s, Ochiai has been outspoken about men who grope women on crowded subways (a topic known as "chikan" or "pervert"), saying that the way to stop the problem is to raise awareness.

Inspired by the Fukushima Daiichi nuclear disaster, Ochiai has held monthly workshops on the problems of nuclear power called "Morning Study of Silent Spring", a reference to her blog, "Journal of Silent Spring", which is itself a reference to Rachel Carson's environmentalist classic Silent Spring. These workshops started in May 2011 and are held at Crayonhouse. She remains an advocate of alternative power sources.

Ochiai has never been married and is proud of her single status, seeing it as a key way of keeping her independence. She is also outspoken about the discrimination she faced as a child born out-of-wedlock.
