= Oshin =

Japanese television drama

- Poster/DVD cover art
- Created by: Sugako Hashida
- Starring: Ayako Kobayashi; Yūko Tanaka; Nobuko Otowa; Pinko Izumi; Shirō Itō; Masatoshi Nakamura; Tsunehiko Watase
- Narrated by: Tomoko Naraoka
- Music by: Kōichi Sakata
- Country of origin: Japan
- Original language: Japanese
- No. of episodes: 297

Production
- Executive producer: Yukiko Okamoto
- Camera setup: Multi-camera
- Running time: 15 minutes per episode, across 297 episodes

Original release
- Network: NHK
- Release: April 4, 1983 – March 31, 1984

Oshin (おしん) is a Japanese serialized morning television drama (asadora), which originally aired on NHK from 4 March 1983 to 31 March 1984; it is the 31st asadora overall to be produced. The 297 15-minute episodes follow the life of Shin Tanokura (田倉しん, Tanokura Shin) during the Meiji period up to the early 1980s. In the work, Shin is called Oshin, the O- forming an archaic cognomen.

It was one of the country's most watched serials of all time and has aired in 68 other countries, with subtitles ranging from English to Arabic. In 1984, the earlier episodes of the drama (focused on young Oshin) were made into an animated movie by Sanrio. The movie reused Sugako Hashida's scripts, and Ayako Kobayashi, who played young Oshin, did Oshin's voiceover.

== Background ==
Oshin is based on the fictional biography of a Japanese woman, modeled after Katsu Wada (和田加津), who co-founded the supermarket chain Yaohan with her husband Ryōhei Wada. The structure of the story was developed through a collection of anonymous letters assembled by Sugako Hashida. "It is the untellable past of a woman of the Meiji period, composed right on her deathbed," Hashida said. "I felt that the telling of her hardships while serving as an apprentice and being sold at a brothel was an obligation our generation needed to honor. However, the themes were so harsh and dark that the show was rejected by every [Japanese] television network. Even NHK opposed it." Hashida said she was told "We can't confront Meiji issues." It was settled when then-station director Mikio Kawaguchi (川口幹夫, Kawaguchi Mikio) gave his approval.

== Plot ==
The story starts in 1983. Instead of attending the opening festivities of the 17th store, Shin Tanokura (Oshin) decides to go on a train trip. Her family is in a frenzy, not knowing where she disappeared to. Oshin's grandson, Kei, remembers the story of the kokeshi doll she once told him. Based on a hunch thinking about the story, he goes on a trip of his own and finds Oshin in Yamagata. From there, the two of them begin a journey back in time, traveling through various parts of Japan including where she once lived years earlier, and starts remembering the difficult times that she faced in her life.

=== Early years in Yamagata ===
In 1907 Yamagata, seven-year-old Oshin is sent off by her father to work as a babysitter to support her sharecropper family. Her boss is a timber trader, and despite the physical and verbal abuse from the chief servant at his household, Oshin insisted on enduring it for the sake of her family. A sympathetic local teacher persuades the trader to allow Oshin to attend elementary school and bring the baby along. However, Oshin's classmates bully her and threaten to harm the baby. Oshin reluctantly stops going to school. However, when she is unjustly accused by the family of stealing money, she runs away, and for days suffers through blizzards as she walks back home to be with her mother, Fuji, nearly freezing to death.

Oshin is rescued by a man named Shunsaku, an Imperial Japanese Army soldier-turned-deserter, and a self-described "hunter". She stays with him during the long winter until the snow melts. She furthers her reading and writing skills under Shunsaku. When the blizzard subsides, they are found by an army unit and Shunsaku is shot dead. Oshin is then escorted by the soldiers to a hut and interrogated about Shunsaku. A senior soldier then comes into the hut and tells Oshin that the unit will escort her home. However, Oshin declines the offer, mentioning that she knows the way, and walks home on her own.

=== Working at Kaga-ya ===
Upon her return, Oshin is once again sent out to work as a babysitter, this time to Kaga-ya in Sakata. Things do not start well because of Oshin's association with the deserter, Shunsaku. She also clashes with Kayo, the family's eldest daughter and designated heir, who is the same age as she. But the matriarch and owner of Kaga-ya, Mrs. Yashiro, views Oshin as a role model to make Kayo more sensible and less like a spoilt child. Kayo resents this, but they eventually become good friends. Mrs. Yashiro sees the potential in Oshin and personally trains her in reading, writing, and arithmetic using the abacus. Kayo's mother is unhappy with the attention Oshin receives, feeling that it is socially out of place for a servant. However, she accepts Oshin into the family when Oshin saves Kayo from a falling utility pole.

Oshin stays at Kaga-ya for eight years until she turns 16. During this time, she is loved by everyone, including her co-workers. In the interim, Oshin's beloved grandmother dies, and the kind Mrs. Yashiro sends Oshin back home in time to spend the last moments with her dying grandmother. Her death steels Oshin's resolve to make something out of her life and to no longer be poor.

One day, a mysterious man, Kōta Takakura, visits Sakata. While Oshin is looking for Kayo, who was at the beach, Kōta uses Oshin as a foil as his girlfriend to elude the police. Kayo and Oshin's lives are changed by this man, the son of a wealthy landowner and an idealist who is a strong follower of socialism, and wants to better the lives of the indebted sharecroppers through political agitation and land reforms. Kōta reveals to Oshin his political mobilization efforts and wins her over with his idealism and passion. Unfortunately, both Kayo and Oshin fall in love with Kōta; however, Kōta does not reciprocate Kayo's love, feeling that it is simply an infatuation, while he has declared his love for Oshin.

In the meantime, Mrs. Yashiro trains Oshin in the Japanese tea ceremony and other feminine arts to boost her chances of marrying well. She attempts to set Oshin up with the second son of a wealthy Sakata family, but the match falls through because of Oshin's secret love for Kōta. Kayo, who has grown up to be passionate about painting and literature, has no interest in taking over Kaga-ya, nor in the feminine arts to improve her marriage prospects. She believes in marrying the man she loves. A rebellious Kayo leaves home on the day she was to meet her prospective husband, fleeing to Tokyo with a reluctant Kōta. Heartbroken and feeling troubled by Kayo's decision to run away from home, and unable to reveal the truth to the Kaga-ya family about Kōta, a guilt-stricken Oshin decides to leave Kaga-ya and return home.

=== Return to Yamagata ===
Upon returning, Oshin is re-united with her older sister, Haru, who was sent home from the textile mill where she had contracted tuberculosis. Haru's last wish is to see her secret love, her former supervisor, Hirano, who is persuaded to visit her. While visiting, Hirano reveals the poor working conditions at the textile mill and his failure to improve the workers' welfare for fear of losing his job. In the meantime, Oshin discovers that her father wants her to work as a barmaid to supplement the family's income. Haru warns Oshin that the agent touting the job had previously conned her fellow textile workers into prostitution. Haru persuades Oshin to run off to Tokyo, giving her a name and address in Tokyo and some money. Haru dies at the age of 19 in 1916. Oshin's mother Fuji, who had also returned home to take care of Haru, supports Oshin in her decision to go to Tokyo. Following her sister's death, Oshin runs off to Tokyo to follow Haru's dream of becoming a hairdresser.

=== Hairdressing in Tokyo ===
Oshin trains under Isho in traditional Japanese hairstyling. Two years into the apprenticeship, Oshin receives a letter from her mother informing her of the sudden death of Sayo, the younger sister of Kayo, from pneumonia. Oshin had also been her babysitter at Kaga-ya in Sakata. Oshin takes leave to visit the grieving family in Sakata. She is told that Kayo had not returned home and was somewhere in Tokyo. Kayo's mother pleads with her to stay behind but Oshin is unable to do so. Oshin is still hurting emotionally from when Kayo and Kōta left Sakata two years earlier.

A year later, Oshin bumps into Kayo at a coffee house in the Ginza while visiting prospective clients on a house call. Kayo had been working as a waitress at an upscale Ginza coffee house. Due to his agitation work, Kōta was not usually around. Upon learning about Sayo's death, Kayo decides to visit her family in Sakata, staying there for a month.

In the meantime, Mrs. Yashiro arranges Kayo's marriage with the third son of an Osaka rice dealer, Masao, a graduate of the Tokyo Imperial University (present-day University of Tokyo), who is prepared to marry into the family to help the family business succeed. Kayo wants to leave for Tokyo to be present for Kōta's return. But when Mrs. Yashiro collapses from a heart attack, Kayo reluctantly stays behind. She telephones Oshin to inform her when Kōta returns to Tokyo. Oshin meets Kōta when visiting Kayo's rented room to clean it. He tells Oshin not to let Kayo know that he is back in Tokyo, and tells Oshin that he does not love Kayo, and that he had only used her to fill the emotional void left behind when he was not able to be with Oshin. Oshin leaves for Sakata to attend Kayo's wedding. She does not update Kayo with news about Kōta for the sake of Kaga-ya's future. Through Kayo, Oshin meets Ryūzō Tanokura, a seemingly rich textile trader who frequents the Ginza coffee houses. The third son of a prominent Saga family, Ryūzō decided to leave home for Tokyo to strike out on his own. Seven years Oshin's senior, Ryūzō falls in love with her, and the two get married despite initial opposition from both their parents.

=== Married life in Tokyo ===
Ryūzō's business begins to go downhill due to the post-war depression and his lack of business acumen. Oshin's attempts to improve business practices are badly received by Ryūzō who believes that business is a man's world. To supplement the family income, Oshin decides to return to work for Isho with Ryūzō's reluctant approval as married women did not usually work. As she increasingly takes on the role of breadwinner, Ryūzō feels undermined as he believes that it is the man's job to look after the family. He becomes increasingly despondent and indolent, and turns to alcohol and women, while Oshin turns a blind eye because of her love for him.

After a confrontation during which Ryūzō makes clear his bitterness, Oshin realises that her working to supporting the family had wounded his pride. She decides that it would be better for Ryūzō if she were to leave him. However, Oshin then discovers that she is pregnant. She decides to quit hairdressing to save her marriage. But with the loss of her income, the household comes to the brink of starvation before Ryūzō realises that he cannot let his pride get in the way of supporting his family. He borrows money to tide them over, and they start to think of a new business venture.

Realising they need capital to start a new business, Oshin persuades Ryūzō to allow her to try selling their cloth at a night market. After a rocky start, she manages to sell all their stock within 10 days with help from gang ringleader Ken. They decide to use the proceeds to start a new business selling Western-style children's clothes designed by Oshin. Due to lacklustre business, Ryūzō arranges to sell their products at Onoya, a large local shop. The affordable clothes are sold out at Onoya on the first day, and Ryūzō begins to expand production despite Oshin's misgivings.

With Oshin's baby arriving soon, Ryūzō arranges for Fuji to visit. Oshin gives birth to a healthy baby boy whom they name Yū ("courageous"). After Fuji leaves, Ryūzō's father also pays a visit to see the baby. The couple learns that Ryūzō's mother Kiyo still refuses to accept Oshin. Ryūzō decides to borrow large sums of money to buy a plot of land and build a large factory, convinced that a successful business will prove his worth even as a third son and persuade his mother to accept their marriage.

One day, they receive an unexpected visit from Kayo who says she has come to see the baby. However she soon reveals that she wishes to run away from her unhappy marriage in Sakata and find Kōta, whom she has learned is at his parents' house in Tokyo. Kōta agrees to meet with Kayo who expresses her desire to be with him. However Kōta tells her that the only reason he met with her was to apologise for the way that he had left her. With his continued involvement in the workers' movement, he was not in a position to have a relationship. Kayo finally realises what a fool she has been all these years and that Oshin was the one Kōta had loved. Kayo resolves to return to Sakata and bear an heir to carry on the family business.

After months of building work and preparation, it is finally the day of the grand opening of the new factory. However disaster strikes, as the Great Kantō earthquake and subsequent fire destroy their factory and house. Their faithful retainer Genji dies protecting Yū, who survives unscathed.

With only shattered dreams and debts, Ryūzō decides that they have no choice but to return to his family in Saga. Oshin is fearful of the treatment she will receive at the hands of her mother-in-law and urges Ryūzō to try once again to build their lives in Tokyo. But after so much disappointment, Ryūzō no longer has the will to try again. Although Oshin wants to stay on in Tokyo with Yū, Fuji (whom the Kaga-yas have sent to Tokyo to find Oshin) persuades her to stay together with Ryūzō for the sake of their son.

=== Hardship in Saga ===
Upon their arrival in Saga, they are greeted warmly by Ryūzō's father, who is overjoyed that they are unharmed. But Oshin receives a barrage of criticism from Kiyo, who blames her for all the disasters that have befallen Ryūzō, including Genji's death. Ryūzō's eldest brother makes it clear that Ryūzō will not receive another penny from the family since he took his share of the inheritance when he left home. Kiyo informs them that they will have to work the fields to earn their keep – the very life that Oshin thought she had escaped when she left home.

Kiyo is controlling and domineering, criticising Oshin at every turn while chiding Ryūzō for not taking charge of his wife. As Ryūzō and Oshin have no money, they are unable to purchase even simple items like soap, needles and thread. Oshin is keen to offer her services as a hairdresser to the villagers, but Ryūzō and Kiyo refuse to allow this as it would bring disgrace to the family. Ryūzō asks Kiyo for money, but she scolds Oshin for complaining to Ryūzō, leading to marital discord between the couple.

Oshin wants to leave and go to the nearby town or back to Tokyo, but Ryūzō will not hear of it as he is worried about how they will support themselves without any money. He decides to join a scheme to reclaim land from the sea, which he will own after 10 years. Oshin is concerned about such a high-risk endeavour but Ryūzō presses ahead nonetheless. While Oshin continues to be bullied by the household, Ryūzō becomes fed up with Oshin's complaining and begins to side with his mother. He even moves to a separate room, much to Kiyo's delight, who encourages him to divorce Oshin.

One day Oshin receives a letter from Isho who has returned to Tokyo after the earthquake and will be opening another hairdressing shop in a few months. Oshin decides to join her in Tokyo when the time comes. As she plans her escape, Oshin discovers she is pregnant with their second child.

On the day that she is due to catch a train to Tokyo, Ryūzō finds out and intercepts her. When he is unable to persuade her to stay, he struggles with her to take their son from her. Oshin falls and hits her head, paralysing her right side. She has no choice but to return to Ryūzō's home.

The partial paralysis in Oshin's hand renders her unable to cook, sew or look after Yū, who is now cared for by Kiyo. As the visible injury was to her head, not her hand, the family including Ryūzō begins to think that Oshin is feigning the injury. Aware that she is a burden to the family, Oshin cannot bring herself to tell anyone that she is pregnant. However Ryūzō finds out that she is pregnant, which brings them closer together once more.

Unfortunately, Kiyo learns that Oshin had planned to run away and wants to throw her out of the house. Ryūzō reveals that Oshin is pregnant and that she must therefore stay with the family. But Kiyo believes it will be inauspicious for Oshin and her own daughter Atsuko, who is also pregnant, to give birth in the same house at the same time – it is said that one of the births will not go well. Oshin agrees to move into the shed, which Kiyo hopes will prevent the superstition from coming true.

After a difficult labour, Atsuko delivers a healthy baby. Oshin goes into labour at the same time, but the malnutrition and forced labour have taken their toll – Oshin's baby is too weak to survive. With this latest calamity, Oshin's mind becomes unhinged.

As Atsuko does not have enough milk for her baby, Kiyo asks Ryūzō to let Oshin breastfeed the baby. While he is initially taken aback by the idea, he agrees thinking that it might comfort and restore Oshin's mind. After feeding the baby, Oshin comes back to her senses and agrees to continue feeding the baby. Kiyo is immensely touched and grateful and promises to treat Oshin better.

After a month, Atsuko returns home with the baby. Unbeknownst to the family, Oshin had already decided to leave the household as she realised that she would have to work the fields for the rest of her life in Saga and would never amount to anything. Now that her duty is done, she informs the family that she will be leaving for Tokyo. Ryūzō agrees to let her leave as a sign of love and they part believing that they will be together again one day. Ryūzō's father and eldest brother give her some money to help her in Tokyo. However Kiyo is furious and refuses to let her take Yū with her.

While preparing to leave the next morning, Tsuneko, Ryūzō's sister-in-law tells her that she will bring Yū to her. As Kiyo refuses to hand over Yū, Oshin has no choice but to trust her sister-in-law. Tsuneko turns out to be true to her word and stole Yū while Kiyo is out and Oshin leaves for Tokyo with Yū.

=== Night market in Tokyo ===
Oshin is warmly welcomed by Isho in Tokyo. But Oshin discovers that her hand is still not recovered enough for her to resume hairdressing. Ringleader Ken helps her to set up a food stall at a night market and rent her own house. All seems well until one day a woman bursts into Oshin's house when Ken is there. She turns out to be Ken's partner and accuses Ken of having an affair with Oshin and spending all his money on her. Ken admits that he is in love with Oshin, but says he has done nothing wrong. Oshin is shocked and saddened to learn that she has been the cause of another woman's grief, and uncomfortable about Ken's feelings for her. She worries that rumours may reach Ryūzō in Saga. Despite Isho's entreaties for Oshin to stay with her, Oshin cannot bring herself to be a burden to Isho, and decides to give up the stall and return to her family home in Yamagata.

Fuji is overjoyed to see her daughter Oshin after 4 years, but Oshin's brother's reception is cold when he realises that she intends to stay. They do not have enough food for her and Yū. Fuji's attempts to protect Oshin widen the rift with her brother and his wife. Oshin manages to find work helping other farmers.

=== Running an eatery in Sakata ===
One day, Oshin is informed that the madam at Kaga-ya is seriously ill and unlikely to recover. Oshin visits the Kaga-yas in time to bid the madam a final farewell. Masao, Kayo's husband comes to offer incense, but Kayo wants him sent away as she is unable to forgive him for having a child with another woman. Oshin convinces Kayo to give Masao one more chance as Kaga-ya needs an heir. Plans are made for Masao to move back into the Kaga-ya household.

When Kayo learns of Oshin's situation, she persuades Oshin to stay in Sakata and open a shop. Oshin decides to open a simple eatery, with a loan from the Kaga-yas.

Oshin's eatery has no customers on its first day. After advertising for 3 days, the eatery begins to do well. As Kayo's father and husband have now taken over the business, Kayo decides to help out at Oshin's eatery. Kayo is surprised and touched when Masao agrees to let her do so.

One evening a drunk customer comes to the eatery demanding sake. Oshin informs him that she does not serve sake and asks him to leave. The customer becomes increasingly belligerent until Kayo finally brings him sake, telling Oshin that they will be able to make more profit this way. Oshin is reluctant as she did not want the eatery turning into a bar.

Eventually the local yakuza turn up at the eatery to stop Oshin from selling sake as her low prices are hurting the business of other bars. As they begin to destroy the shop, Kayo is terrified and tells the yakuza they will comply, but Oshin is utterly adamant that she will not give in to them. Insisting that they take the matter outside, the yakuza are surprised when Oshin gives the formal yakuza greeting of Ken's house in Tokyo. Soon, they are all enjoying warm sake in Oshin's eatery, where the local yakuza express their admiration for Oshin, calling her sister and promising their protection. Oshin confesses to Kayo later that in fact she is not part of Ken's yakuza house, but had learned the greeting from him.

Oshin's eatery is now doing well enough to support Ryūzō, Oshin and Yū. Oshin has been writing to Ryūzō regularly for a year but has never received a reply. Little does she know that Kiyo has been intercepting Oshin's letters, so Ryūzō does not even know where Oshin lives. Oshin decides to write to Ryūzō one last time. If Ryūzō does not reply, she will give up on him.

One evening, Kōta comes to Oshin's eatery, not realising that it is run by Oshin. Kayo, who has now gotten over her infatuation for him, tells Kōta that Oshin and Yū have been abandoned by Ryūzō. Kōta tells Oshin that the labour movement is now legitimate and he no longer needs to hide from the police. He offers to become a father to Yū.

But all too soon, the government cracks down on the labour movement, making it once again difficult for Kōta to have a family. Oshin tells Kōta that just hearing his words of love have erased the years of bitterness from her heart. Kōta tells Oshin that although they will not marry, he will always look after them. Oshin says this is enough for her. Kōta says he will write to Ryūzō to make his intentions known.

Back in Saga, in a bid to persuade Ryūzō to give up on Oshin and remarry, Kiyo shows him Kōta's letter, in which he mentions that Oshin sent Ryūzō many letters but did not receive a reply. Kiyo says that Oshin must have been lying to Kōta to make herself look good. Unable to bear the deceit any longer, Tsuneko finally shows Ryūzō a stack of Oshin's letters that Kiyo had intercepted but which she had saved. Ryūzō tells his mother to give up on the idea of his remarriage. Oshin is his wife and once he reclaims the land, he will ask Oshin to return. In the meantime it is better that she continues to work in Sakata rather than suffering in Saga. If they are faithful to each other, they will be together again one day. Ryūzō writes to Oshin and sends her some money.

Oshin is overjoyed to finally receive a letter from Ryūzō. However Kōta is astonished that Ryūzō is staying in Saga instead of coming to Sakata. But Oshin understands that Ryūzō has his male pride – he wants to succeed at the land reclamation. Also, Oshin knows that Ryūzō would not like running an eatery.

One evening, two drunken customers get into a knife fight in the eatery. Kōta wants to intervene but Oshin says she will handle it as they are her customers. Not only does she manage to persuade them to take the fight outside, she even gets them to pay their bills. Watching Oshin scrabble on the floor picking up money and crockery, and fending off the advances of drunken customers, Kōta becomes increasingly worried. He points out that if Ryūzō does not like running an eatery, things could be difficult if he were to come to Sakata. Kōta advises Oshin to consider a different trade.

=== Selling seafood in Ise ===
Kōta arranges for Oshin to stay with his aunt in Ise and sell fish instead. Oshin soon picks up the trade and gains customers with her low prices and resourcefulness. She dreams that one day Ryūzō will join her and Yū in Ise.

One evening, a typhoon hits Japan, washing away the land in Saga that Ryūzō had been painstakingly reclaiming for the past 4 years. With his dreams shattered once more, Ryūzō leaves Saga to forge a new life.

As Oshin sets off to sell fish one morning, she sees a familiar figure some distance away – it is Ryūzō. When she catches up to him, he reveals that he is on his way to Manchuria, where he has friends, to start again. He had planned to come to Ise to divorce Oshin but when he saw her and Yū, he was unable to do so. He tells her to wait for him. As he turns to leave once more, he sees Yū and they have a tearful reunion.

On the morning that Ryūzō is due to leave for Manchuria, he helps her push her cart to town and Oshin bids him goodbye. However, struck by the heaviness of the cart which Oshin pushes for 7 miles a day, Ryūzō decides to follow her to see what her life selling fish is like. When he sees how hard she has to work, he decides that he has no choice but to stay to help her. Oshin is overjoyed to be together as a family once more. With help from Oshin's landlady, the couple start a fish shop in town. Ryūzō begins to learn about fish and how to prepare and cook it.

Oshin writes to Saga to update Ryūzō's parents on his whereabouts. Kiyo is furious and asks her husband to go to Ise to retrieve Ryūzō, but he tells Kiyo that she must never separate them again. Kiyo finally realises that Ryūzō's love for his wife is greater than his love for his mother. She sends Ryūzō his possessions, along with a letter encouraging to make a new life in Ise with Oshin. Oshin is overjoyed that Kiyo has finally forgiven her, and is determined to make the shop a success so that Ryūzō's parents can visit one day.

=== A new beginning, and an end ===
Fuji is getting older and weaker, and is unable to do much work in the fields. Her son and daughter-in-law begin to resent having a useless mouth to feed. When Oshin writes inviting her mother to visit them in Ise, Oshin's brother is keen for his mother to stay with Oshin permanently. Just as Oshin and Ryūzō are wondering how to persuade her mother to stay with them, Oshin discovers that she is pregnant for the third time. Fuji is worried about being a burden as she is no longer strong enough to work. But Ryūzō's and Oshin's heartfelt entreaties convince her to stay, at least until Oshin delivers the baby. Oshin is also delighted to learn that after 10 years of marriage, Kayo is finally pregnant with the Kaga-ya heir.

Oshin gives birth to a healthy baby boy, Hitoshi ("benevolence"). However, minutes after the birth, Fuji collapses. They discover that she has leukaemia, which is incurable. To fulfil her mother's last wish, Oshin brings her home to Yamagata, carrying her on her back as Fuji is too weak by now to walk. Fuji dies in Oshin's arms in her own home.

=== The downfall of Kaga-ya ===
Oshin learns that Kayo's husband Masao has committed suicide. Kōta appears asking Oshin to bring 100 yen to Kayo who is living in Tokyo. When Ryūzō sees the address, he tells Oshin that before the earthquake, this was a bad neighbourhood with many brothels. Oshin is adamant that Kayo would never turn to prostitution no matter how bad things became. But Ryūzō warns Oshin to prepare herself for the worst.

Oshin enlists Ken's help to find Kayo in Tokyo's red-light district. Now a prostitute, a broken and dissipated Kayo reveals that Masao had gambled Kaga-ya's entire fortune away on rice derivatives that went awry. She and her parents had come to Tokyo but her mother fell ill after her father died, so Kayo had sold herself into prostitution to pay for her mother's medical bills. Unable to even bring their bones back to Sakata for a proper burial, Kayo now lives for her son Nozomi.

Unable to raise the 1,000 yen required to buy Kayo out of prostitution, Oshin is determined to at least bring Nozomi to Ise. But when she and Ken return to the brothel the following morning, they discover that Kayo has died. She had a weak stomach but drank a large amount of sake the night before and vomited blood, eventually choking to death.

Oshin finds a letter from Kayo among her belongings. Kayo knew she did not have long to live, but after meeting Oshin again, she knew that she could entrust Nozomi to Oshin's care. Oshin swears that from that day on, she will regard Nozomi as her own son.

=== The family grows ===
Oshin brings Nozomi back to Ise, and to a supportive Ryūzō. They bury the bones of Kayo and her parents in Ise so that Nozomi can visit them and can take them to Sakata one day if he chooses.

One day Kōta comes to Ise. He asks Oshin for the location of Kayo's grave so that he can pay his respects in the morning. Oshin says she will meet him there so that he can see Nozomi but he tells her no, in case he is followed by the police. The next morning, Oshin waits for him at the grave with Nozomi and Hitoshi, but when Kōta arrives he is captured by the special policemen who accuse him of planning to escape to Moscow. The policemen allow Kōta to light incense for Kayo before they take him away. Kōta pretends that he does not know Oshin to protect her, but Oshin is devastated to see Kōta being taken away.

4 years later, Ken visits Ise on his way to Osaka. He is accompanied by Hatsuko, a 9-year-old girl from Yamagata whom he intends to sell to a brothel in Osaka as a cleaning girl. Ken is related to her parents – tenant farmers who had a bad harvest this year and had no other choice but to try to sell their daughter for 50 yen. Hatsuko's hard fate and cheerful resourcefulness remind Oshin of herself when she was a girl, and of Ai, the baby girl Oshin had lost who would be the same age as Hatsuko had she lived. The couple decide to take Hatsuko in, paying Ken the 50 yen. Ryūzō and Oshin treat Hatsuko as part of the family, even arranging for her to continue her education.

Hatsuko grows closer to Oshin's sons. Soon, Yū is about to take an important examination. Yū tells Hatsuko that he must pass the examination because his mother has always worked so hard to look after him. The night before the examination, Oshin and Ryūzō are awakened by the sound of running water. When they go into the courtyard, they discover Hatsuko pouring cold water on herself while praying for Yū to pass his examination, a village superstition. The family is touched by her sincere, if foolish, actions.

The day before Hitoshi and Nozomi start school, Oshin decides to tell Nozomi that he is adopted and that his birth parents are the Yashiros. She takes him to visit his parents' grave. Nozomi seems to takes the revelation well, but on his first day at school he is bullied for being an orphan and runs away from home. The family search all day and night for Nozomi, and a devastated Oshin ends up at Kayo's grave, where she finds Nozomi. When she sees him, she slaps him for not being strong enough to face up to the bullies. She tells Nozomi that life will be full of difficulties. He promises to go back to school, and Oshin tells him again that the whole family sees him as one of them. Oshin brings Nozomi home where he is warmly welcomed by everyone.

Oshin discovers that she is pregnant once more. Ryūzō is delighted, but concerned about making ends meet, he suggests sending Hatsuko back when her 3-year contract is over and she has graduated from junior high school. In any case Hatsuko's parents must be waiting for her. Oshin is reluctant to let Hatsuko go and feels that they should let her decide for herself when the time comes.

Oshin gives birth to a healthy girl whom they name Tei ("happiness"). Having reached the end of her contract, Hatsuko feels that she should go home because otherwise she will be a burden to the family with the addition of the baby. But when Ryūzō and Oshin realise that Hatsuko would in fact prefer to stay, they joyfully welcome her to the family.

=== Japan enters war ===
Japan begins to enter a period of military rule. Ryūzō gets involved with the military to raise more money along with the fish shop, something Oshin opposes but relents when she puts his interests at heart and decided that they need the financial support. Due to the military propaganda during this time period, Yū begins to side with the military and support the Second Sino-Japanese War.

When Yū began to apply for high school, he asked Ryūzō for permission to join the Military Officers Academy, where students are taught to become a military officer to fight the war. Oshin overhears the conversation and intervenes just when Ryūzō approves. Due to Oshin's convictions of pacifism, Oshin gets desperate to keep Yū from applying. When Yū remains firm on his decision to apply, Hatsuko reminds him that Oshin doesn't want him to fight since she has gone through adversity with him when he was still a child. To humor Oshin, Yū decides to apply to a school in Kyoto to study Humanities instead of applying to the Military Officers Academy.

As 1940 arrives, food rationing is on the rise to support the war effort. This was also the time when the black market surfaced to sell rationed goods. When the black market began to sell illegal imports of fish, Oshin is forced to close down the store to prevent trouble. Hisa moves to Tokyo due to the lack of fishermen and rations. Subsequently, Oshin's family moves to a new house that was previously owned by a man working with the military, who relocated in Pyongyang. When Yū came by to visit, Yū and Hatsuko profess their love for each other, something that Ryūzō opposes. Ryūzō also gets involved in the military committee, where he encourages boys in the area to enlist, and begins to manage a uniforms factory. Life continues as usual until Yū visits again in 1943.

Yū reveals to Ryūzō that student-exemptions for military drafts have been lifted, and later he breaks the news to Oshin that he must enlist within one month. A shocked Oshin begins to cry in front of Yū and feels like she betrayed Shunsaku, the military deserter who instilled pacifism in her as a child. After one month, Yū leaves in uniform.

As air raids began to be feared, Ryūzō mulls whether to send Tei to the countryside where she won't be affected by the air raids. Ryūzō sends her to a home of one of his factory workers where Tei gets mistreated and neglected. As Japan begins to lose, Yū's regiment is sent to the Philippines, where he would be safer due to the air raids in Japan. Hitoshi begins to support the war effort and declares that he wants to join the kamikaze squad, something both Oshin and Ryūzō oppose. However, Hitoshi sneaks out and joins the kamikaze.

Oshin's family begins to experience their first air raid and her first priority is to keep the house from burning down instead of evacuating into a bomb shelter. Before the bombs ignite into flames, Nozomi and Hatsuko get containers of water ready and diligently fight the fire but see that the factories they manage are burning down. After the air raid, Oshin receives a telegram stating Yū has died in the Philippines. Oshin refuses to believe until she has seen his body, and been informed by his best friend, who confessed Yū had malaria. Soon, Japan surrenders to the Allies in 1945.

However, Ryūzō soon finds out that his company is completely out of money. Feeling scared, disappointed, and angered that he betrayed Oshin, he is found on a mountain by a commoner, having killed himself, in spite of knowing Oshin and his family needed him. The widowed Oshin successfully brings back home Tei with her. Hatsuko, not being able to handle everything, leaves for Tokyo, to work at a rice store.

New trouble arises when the original owners of the house return from Pyongyang and demand their house back. They still hold the deed for the property and the paperwork Oshin produced was signed by the Japanese military which is not worth anything now. The Tanokura family is forced to co-habit and are miserable. After being arrested for selling food on the street to earn money for her remaining family, Oshin gets kicked out of her house by an angry landlord. This entire war motivated Oshin to work as hard as she can, for her family's sake at least.

Mrs. Hisayama reenters their life and she visits Oshin to let her know that she is going to start her fishing business in Ise. She invites Oshin and her family to come live with her and Oshin happily accepts.

=== Seafood and vegetable store ===
A decade after the war, Oshin is now 55 years old, and owns a seafood and vegetable market with Hitoshi. Ken visits Oshin, telling her she must visit Tokyo as soon as she can. Hatsuko lied when she said she worked at a rice shop. She really works at a brothel, greeting soldiers every night. This was supposedly her rebound from Yū. Oshin finds her in the brothel, asks Ken to drag her out, and slaps her. Oshin manages to convince Hatsuko to return home with her and to forget everything that had happened in Tokyo. Shortly afterwards, they hire a sweet girl named Yuri to work with them, as they drop by people's houses and deliver their food. Hitoshi has decided that he wants to become a businessman and make a living from there. He also tells Yuri that one day, he and Yuri will get married. Few months later, Hitoshi leaves for Tokyo to work as a clerk only to learn that he cannot get a job as a delivery man without a college education. He drifts in Tokyo for several months and returns home. He meets his future wife, Michiko, daughter of a rich businessman. Later Yuri learns about her and runs away from home. Oshin is very upset at Hitoshi and opposed to his marriage with Michiko.

== Reception ==
In Japan, the annual average audience share was 52.6%, with a peak rating of 62.9% for a single episode. Oshin served as a symbolic figure for perseverance, showing that a person should never give up – even in the most trying times. She was loved not only by the Japanese, but also by people from all over the world.

Oshin enjoyed popularity when broadcast in Asian countries. Singapore was the first country in Asia and the world to broadcast the drama outside Japan. The drama was broadcast three times due to popularity. First being broadcast in Mandarin on MediaCorp Channel 8 in November 1984, it was aired again on the same channel the following year. The drama was dubbed into English and broadcast on MediaCorp Channel 5 later in 1994. The drama enjoyed popularity in numerous Asian countries such as Thailand (1984), Hong Kong (1984), China (1985), Malaysia (1986), Indonesia (1986), the drama was also dubbed in Sinhala and was aired on Rupavahini in Sri Lanka (1989), Pakistan (1991), Bangladesh (1992-1993), Nepal (1992), India (1992), Vietnam, Philippines (1993) and Mongolia (1996), Myanmar (1994) and Taiwan (1994) to name a few. Oshin also enjoyed immense popularity in the Middle East where it was broadcast in countries such as Iran (1986), Jordan (1987), Morocco (1988), Bahrain (1989), Syria (1990), Lebanon (1991) and Egypt (1992). In the Americas, Oshin was broadcast in Mexico (1988), Puerto Rico (1989), Dominican Republic (1989), United States (1989), Cuba (1990), Ethiopia (1992), Brazil (1984), Venezuela (1991), Peru (1991), Colombia (1992), Bolivia (1992), Argentina (1992), Chile (1993), Paraguay (1993), and Ecuador (1994).

Even today, Ayako Kobayashi (小林綾子, Kobayashi Ayako) is given warm reception when she visits such countries. Oshin was one of the rare films broadcast during the Iran–Iraq War. In February 2017, Ayako Kobayashi visited Sri Lanka, where the drama enjoyed immense popularity during the late 1980s, for the "Japan Expo Premier Sri Lanka 2017".

== Cast ==
- Ayako Kobayashi as Tanimura Shin (maiden name) (as a child, 7–9 years old)
- Yūko Tanaka as Tanimura Shin / Tanokura Shin (married name) (as a teenager and adult, 16–46 years old)
- Nobuko Otowa as Tanokura Shin (as an elderly woman, 50–84 years old)
- Shirō Namiki as Tanokura Ryūzō
- Shirō Itō as Tanimura Sakuzō
- Naomi Hase as Yamane Atsuko (Tanokura Atsuko)
- Pinko Izumi as Tanimura Fuji
- Aya Shikiya as Yashiro Kayo (as a child, 7–9 years old)
- Terumi Azuma as Yashiro Kayo (as a teenager and adult, 16–31 years old)
- Kazuo Kitamura as Tanokura Daigorō
- Sōichirō Kitamura as Tanokura Fukutarō
- Tsunehiko Watase as Takakura Kōta / Namiki Kōta (name change) (as an adult and elderly man)
- Akio Kaneda as Hirano
- Harue Akagi as Kamiyama Hisa
- Sei Hiraizumi as Nakagawa Gunji
- Masatoshi Nakamura as Shunsaku
- Hiroyuki Nagato as Kawabe Sakuzō
- Ryūtarō Ōtomo as Eizō
- Etsushi Takahashi as Tanokura Hitoshi (as an adult, 38–55 years old)
- Yoshiko Tanaka as Tanokura Hatsuko (Hat-chan) (as a teenager)

== Feature film ==
In October 2013, a feature film based on the series was screened in cinemas across Japan. The film focuses on Oshin's childhood.

== Legacy ==
In Japan, many references to Oshin were made when describing perseverance in the 1980s. For example, sumo wrestler Takanosato was given the name "Oshin Yokozuna", as he fought his way up to the rank of yokozuna, despite dealing with diabetes. Other terms were used during the 1980s, such as "Oshin Diet", where residents were dealing with the bubble economy and therefore were driven to eating radish and rice. A famous cruise line down the Mogami River was renamed the "Oshin Line".

The comedy manga Ouran High School Host Club by Bisco Hatori has Tamaki Suou, leader of the club at the academy for the idle rich, refer to Haruhi Fujioka, the newcomer girl dressed as a boy as "Oshin", someone "sold to a mean master who'd overwork you and leave you crying into your pillow night after night." He also asks if Haruhi subsisted "on rice and horseradish." Haruhi is a poor but diligent student attending on scholarship.

In Vietnamese, the term ô-sin became a synonym (sometimes with scorn) for domestic workers.

As a homage to Oshin's trade, second-hand clothing stores in Iran are called "Tanakura shop" (Persian: مغازه تاناکورا) or simply Tanakura. By the time, Tanakura became colloquial for second-hand clothes in Iran, although Oshin's trade was in textiles and later (before the earthquake) about fabricated clothes.

On 28 January 1989, Iran National Radio had a special report on the birthday anniversary of Fatimah, the daughter of the Prophet Mohammed. The aim of the report was to tell the people that Fatimah was the best role-model for the Iranian women. But all of a sudden, a young lady told the reporter that despite the common belief, she cannot accept Fatimah as a role-model because Fatimah lived 1400 years ago. She added that some women accepted Oshin as a role-model, but she could not accept that either, because Oshin was from Japan, a different culture. But that ignited the anger of Ayatollah Khomeini. He ordered the National Radio and Television to prosecute those involved in that report. He asked for execution of those people if it was deliberate. Khomeini regarded that report as an insult to Fatimah and according to his interpretation of the Islamic Jurisprudence the punishment of such an act was death. Fortunately, nobody was executed, but 5 people were reportedly prosecuted with the punishments ranging from imprisonment to lashing according to the Sharia law.

== See also ==
- Princess Sara
