= Toshiyuki Kajiyama =

Japanese novelist

- Kajiyama Toshiyuki
- Born: 2 January 1930; Seoul, Korea
- Died: 11 May 1975 (aged 45); Hong Kong
- Occupations: Novelist; essayist; journalist
- Writing career
- Genres: Mystery novel, spy novel, historical novel, erotic novel

Toshiyuki Kajiyama (梶山 季之, Kajiyama Toshiyuki; 2 January 1930 – 11 May 1975) was a Japanese novelist, essayist and journalist active during the Shōwa period of Japan.

== Early life ==
Kajiyama was born in Keijo (present day Seoul) in Japanese-occupied Korea, where his father was a civil engineer. He lived in Korea to the end of World War II, when he was repatriated together with his parents to his father's home town of Hatsukaichi in Hiroshima Prefecture. He was a graduate of the Hiroshima Higher Normal School (the predecessor to Hiroshima University). After graduation, he worked as an investigative reporter, and submitted short stories and small articles to literary magazines such as Shukan Shincho and Shūkan Bunshun. In 1961, Kajiyama was hospitalized with tuberculosis for three months.

== Literary career ==
In 1962, Kajiyama published his first novel, Kuro no shis ōsha ("The Black Test Model"), which he wrote in a documentary style. The novel was an all-time bestseller in Japan for several years, and started the genre of the industrial espionage novel in Japan. The story involves two motor companies vying to produce a new sports car. The intense competition in the Japanese automobile industry causes the companies to resort to industrial espionage to gain an advantage. The protagonist of the story even sacrifices his girlfriend in order to beat the other company. However, eventually he realizes the futility of sacrificing his personal life for the uncaring corporation, which regards him as only a disposable cog in a huge machine. The novel was made into a film by Daiei Motion Picture Company in 1962, Black Test Car, directed by Yasuzo Masumura. Its success was such that Daiei subsequently released ten more thriller-action films with similar themes, each using the word "black" in its title. Kajiyama also followed up on the novel's success with a number of bestsellers, including a series of "police woman novels" which were serialized in the Shukan Shincho magazine in 1966. By 1969, he was one of the highest paid authors in Japan. However, in 1972, he had a relapse of his tuberculosis, and retired to his villa in Izu, from which he continued to write, and to participate in the activities of the Japanese chapter of the PEN International.

However, few of Kajiyama's popular novels have been translated into English, and he is known more in the West for his works on Korea under Japanese rule. Kajiyama was awarded the prestigious Naoki Prize in 1963 for a work on Korea, The Remembered Shadow of the Yi Dynasty (Richō zan'ei).

In 1965 he began serializing a novel about Soka Gakkai, but a flood of complaints from Soka Gakkai supporters caused the editor of the magazine so much stress that he went missing; the series was never completed.

Kajiyama died suddenly of cirrhosis of the liver while at a hotel in Hong Kong, where he was researching materials for a new book.

After his death, his library was donated to the University of Hawaiʻi at Mānoa. Because of his background, Kajiyama was attracted both to the culture and people of Korea and the question of Japanese overseas migration. He collected more than 1,000 volumes of materials, some of which were classified documents of the Governor-General of Chōsen in preparation of an epic on the history of Japanese migration, but the project was never completed due to his untimely early death.

== Selected works ==
- 1961: The Clan Records (Zokufu)
- 1962: Kuro no shis ōsha
- 1962: Akai daiya
- 1963: The Remembered Shadow of the Yi Dynasty (Richō zan'ei)

== See also ==
- Japanese literature
- List of Japanese authors

== Bibliography ==
- Kajiyama, Toshiyuki (1995). "The Clan Records, Seeking Life amidst Death: The Last Day of the War, When the Hibiscus Blooms, The Remembered Shadow of the Yi Dynasty, A Crane on a Dunghill: Seoul in 1936". The Clan Records: Five Stories of Korea. Translated by Dykstra, Yoshiko. University of Hawai'i Press. ISBN 0-8248-1532-7.
