= The Tigers (Japanese band) =

Japanese rock band

- Origin: Japan
- Genres: Group Sounds, baroque pop
- Years active: 1967-1971, 1981-1983
- Label: Polydor
- Members: Kenji Sawada (Vocal); Ittoku Kishibe (Vocal, Bass); Shiro Kishibe (Vocal, Guitar, Tambourine); Kahashi Katsumi (Guitar, Vocal); Taro Morimoto (Guitar); Minoru Hitomi (Drums); Nobuo Satake (Drums)

The Tigers were a Japanese rock band formed in 1967, during the Group Sounds era. The group featured Kenji Sawada as their lead singer, and were signed by Watanabe Productions.

The group was first named "The Funnies", and was formed in 1966. Their first TV performance was on November 15, 1966 on The Hit Parade. The band was renamed to "The Tigers" by recommendation of the show's director Koichi Sugiyama, who would later go on to compose many of their songs. They appeared in several Japanese movies in the late 1960s.

The Tigers recorded "Smile for Me", composed by Barry and Maurice Gibb of The Bee Gees, which was released as a single in July 1969 in the UK and Japan. Also in March 1969, the group was featured on the cover of the US magazine Rolling Stone, the cover story was about rock music in Japan.

On 24 January 1971, The Tigers held their last concert, The Tigers Beautiful Concert, at the Nippon Budokan. After The Tigers broke up, Sawada formed the first Japanese supergroup, Pyg, in 1971.

In 1981, they reunited.

== Singles ==
Year	Title (A-side/B-side)	Lyricist	Composer
1967	"My Mary" "Let Me See You Baby" ^{(B-side)}	Jun Hashimoto	Koichi Sugiyama
1967	"Seaside Bound" "Prince in the Heaven" ^{(B-side)}	Jun Hashimoto	Koichi Sugiyama
1967	"Mona Liza's Smile" "Red Jacket" ^{(B-side)}	Jun Hashimoto	Koichi Sugiyama
1968	"Love Only For You" "The Story of the Falling Leaves" ^{(B-side)}	Jun Hashimoto	Koichi Sugiyama
1968	"Flower Necklace" "Romance in the Milky Way" ^{(B-side)}	Jun Hashimoto	Koichi Sugiyama
1968	"C-C-C" "Knight in the Night" ^{(B-side)}	Kazumi Yasui; Jun Hashimoto	Kunihiko Kase; Koichi Sugiyama
1968	"A White Dove" "The Glorious World" ^{(B-side)}	Michio Yamagami; Rei Nakanishi	Kunihiko Murai; Koichi Sugiyama
1968	"Blue Bird" "Jinjin Banban" ^{(B-side)}	Taro Morimoto; Jun Hashimoto	Taro Morimoto; Koichi Sugiyama
1969	"A Decree Of Love" "The Wind Doesn't Know" ^{(B-side)}	Rei Nakanishi; Tokiko Iwatani	Kunihiko Murai
1969	"Grief" "Barefoot" ^{(B-side)}	Kazumi Yasui	Kunihiko Murai
1969	"Smile For Me" "Rain Falls on the Lonely" ^{(B-side)}	Barry Gibb & Maurice Gibb; Ronald Bond & Ronnie Sebastian	Barry Gibb & Maurice Gibb; Ronald Bond & Ronnie Sebastian
1969	"Now I Forgive You" "Love, Love, Love" ^{(B-side)}	Kazumi Yasui	Kunihiko Murai
1970	"Solitude in the City" "Ring the Bell of Anger" ^{(B-side)}	Michio Yamagami	Kunio Kawachi
1970	"The Free Travel" "The Falling of Youthful Days" ^{(B-side)}	Michio Yamagami	Kenji Sawada; Taro Morimoto
1970	"Promise For Future" "Nothing But Departure" ^{(B-side)}	Michio Yamagami; Jan Tokunaga	Kunio Kawachi; Taro Morimoto

== Movies ==
- Dorifutazu desu yo! Zenshin zenshin matazenshin (1967, Toho)
- The Tigers: The World Is Waiting For Us (1968, Toho)
- The Tigers: Gorgeous Invitation (1968, Toho)
- The Tigers: Hi! London (1969, Toho)
- Kigeki migimuke hidari! (1970, Toho)
