= 24th Japan Academy Film Prize =

Japanese film awards in 2001

- Date: March 9, 2001
- Site: Grand Prince Hotel New Takanawa, Tokyo, Japan
- Hosted by: Hiroshi Sekiguchi; Shinobu Otake

Highlights
- Best Picture: After the Rain
- Most awards: After the Rain (8)
- Most nominations: After the Rain (12)

The 24th Japan Academy Film Prize (第24回日本アカデミー賞) is the 24th edition of the Japan Academy Film Prize, an award presented by the Nippon Academy-Sho Association to award excellence in filmmaking. It awarded the best films of 2000 and it took place on March 9, 2001 at the Grand Prince Hotel New Takanawa in Tokyo, Japan.

== Nominees ==
=== Awards ===
Picture of the Year	Director of the Year
After the Rain; Face; A Class to Remember 4: Fifteen; Battle Royale; Whiteout	Junji Sakamoto - Face; Takashi Koizumi - After the Rain; Kinji Fukasaku - Battle Royale; Yoji Yamada - A Class to Remember 4: Fifteen; Setsurō Wakamatsu - Whiteout
Screenplay of the Year	Popularity Award
Akira Kurosawa - After the Rain; Shinichi Ichikawa - Nagasaki Burabura Bushi; Junji Sakamoto and Isamu Uno - Face; Kenta Fukasaku - Battle Royale; Yoji Yamada, Yoshitaka Asama, Emiko Hiramatsu - A Class to Remember 4: Fifteen	Battle Royale (Production Category); Morning Musume - Pinch Runner (Actor Category)
Outstanding Performance by an Actor in a Leading Role	Outstanding Performance by an Actress in a Leading Role
Akira Terao - After the Rain; Yūji Oda - Whiteout; Naoto Takenaka - By Player; Tatsuya Fujiwara - Battle Royale; Kōji Yakusho - Dora-heita	Sayuri Yoshinaga - Nagasaki Burabura Bushi; Rena Tanaka - First Love; Nanako Matsushima - Whiteout; Yoshiko Miyazaki - After the Rain; Mitsuko Mori - Kawa no Nagare no Yō ni
Outstanding Performance by an Actor in a Supporting Role	Outstanding Performance by an Actress in a Supporting Role
Kōichi Satō - Whiteout; Hidekazu Akai - A Class to Remember 4: Fifteen; Tsurutaro Kataoka - Dora-heita; Tetsurō Tamba - A Class to Remember 4: Fifteen; Shirō Mifune - After the Rain	Mieko Harada - After the Rain; Rei Asami - A Class to Remember 4: Fifteen; Michiyo Okusu - Face; Reiko Takashima - Nagasaki Burabura Bushi; Mieko Harada - First Love
Outstanding Achievement in Music	Outstanding Achievement in Cinematography
Masaru Sato - After the Rain; Masamichi Amano - Battle Royale; Michiru Ōshima - Nagasaki Burabura Bushi; Ken Ishii and Norihito Sumitomo - Whiteout; coba - Face	Masaharu Ueda - After the Rain; Yukio Isohata - Dora-heita; Tatsuo Suzuki - Nagasaki Burabura Bushi; Mutsuo Naganuma - A Class to Remember 4: Fifteen; Hideo Yamamoto - Whiteout
Outstanding Achievement in Lighting Direction	Outstanding Achievement in Art Direction
Takeji Sano - After the Rain; Kazuo Shimomura - Dora-heita; Kiyoto Andō - Nagasaki Burabura Bushi; Sōsuke Yoshikado - A Class to Remember 4: Fifteen; Yoshikazu Motohashi - Whiteout	Yoshirō Muraki - After the Rain; Fumio Ogawa - Whiteout; Mitsuo Degawa - A Class to Remember 4: Fifteen; Yoshinobu Nishioka - Dora-heita and Nagasaki Burabura Bushi
Outstanding Achievement in Sound Recording	Outstanding Achievement in Film Editing
Osamu Onodera - Whiteout; Kunio Andō - Battle Royale; Kazumi Kishida - A Class to Remember 4: Fifteen; Mike Samata and Yōji Takemoto - Nagasaki Burabura Bushi; Kenichi Benitani - After the Rain	Hirohide Abe - Battle Royale; Hideto Aga - After the Rain; Chizuko Osada - Dora-heita; Yoshifumi Fukazawa - Whiteout; Hiroshi Miyake - Nagasaki Burabura Bushi
Outstanding Foreign Language Film	Newcomer of the Year
Dancer in the Dark; American Beauty; Gladiator; The Green Mile; Shiri	Yuta Kanai - A Class to Remember 4: Fifteen; Tatsuya Fujiwara - Battle Royale; Tomoyasu Hotei -New Battles Without Honor and Humanity; Kyoko Fukada - Shisha no Gakuensai; Aki Maeda - Battle Royale; Morning Musume - Pinch Runner
Special Award of Honour from the Association	Award for Distinguished Service from the Chairman
Isuzu Yamada (Actor)	Yasuyoshi Tokuma
Special Award from the Chairman	Special Award from the Association
Yasuo Tanami (Screenwriter); So Yamamura (Actor); Kōzaburō Yoshimura (Director)	Tomoko Asami (Hairdressing); Toshio Iwata (Development Timing); Makoto Negishi (Technical Coordinator)
