= 26th Japan Academy Film Prize =

Japanese film awards in 2003

- Date: March 7, 2003
- Site: Grand Prince Hotel New Takanawa, Tokyo, Japan
- Hosted by: Hiroshi Sekiguchi; Keiko Kishi

Highlights
- Best Picture: The Twilight Samurai
- Most awards: The Twilight Samurai (12)
- Most nominations: The Twilight Samurai (14)

The 26th Japan Academy Film Prize (第26回日本アカデミー賞) is the 26th edition of the Japan Academy Film Prize, an award presented by the Nippon Academy-Sho Association to award excellence in filmmaking. It awarded the best films of 2002 and it took place on March 7, 2003 at the Grand Prince Hotel New Takanawa in Tokyo, Japan.

== Nominees ==
=== Awards ===
Picture of the Year	Director of the Year
The Twilight Samurai; Letters from the Mountains; The Choice of Hercules; Dawn of a New Day: The Man Behind VHS; Ping Pong	Yoji Yamada – The Twilight Samurai; Takashi Koizumi – Letters from the Mountains; Fumihiko Sori – Ping Pong; Masato Harada – The Choice of Hercules; Hideyuki Hirayama – Out
Screenplay of the Year	Popularity Award
Yoji Yamada and Yoshitaka Asama – The Twilight Samurai; Kankurō Kudō – Ping Pong; Takashi Koizumi – Letters from the Mountains; Masato Harada – The Choice of Hercules; Kōki Mitani – Ryōma no Tsuma to Sono Aijin	The Story of Dan the Puppy (Production Category); Anne Suzuki – Returner (Actor Category)
Outstanding Performance by an Actor in a Leading Role	Outstanding Performance by an Actress in a Leading Role
Hiroyuki Sanada – The Twilight Samurai; Akira Terao – Letters from the Mountains; Etsushi Toyokawa – Inochi; Toshiyuki Nishida – Dawn of a New Day: The Man Behind VHS; Kōji Yakusho – The Choice of Hercules	Rie Miyazawa – The Twilight Samurai; Makiko Esumi – Inochi; Kyōka Suzuki – Ryōma no Tsuma to Sono Aijin; Mieko Harada – Out; Kanako Higuchi – Letters from the Mountains
Outstanding Performance by an Actor in a Supporting Role	Outstanding Performance by an Actress in a Supporting Role
Min Tanaka – The Twilight Samurai; Gorō Kishitani – Returner; Nenji Kobayashi – The Twilight Samurai; Tsutomu Yamazaki – Mohōhan; Ken Watanabe – Dawn of a New Day: The Man Behind VHS	Tanie Kitabayashi – Letters from the Mountains; Kirin Kiki – Returner; Keiko Kishi – The Twilight Samurai; Mari Natsuki – Ping Pong; Mitsuko Baisho – Out
Outstanding Achievement in Music	Outstanding Achievement in Cinematography
Isao Tomita – The Twilight Samurai; Michiru Ōshima – Dawn of a New Day: The Man Behind VHS; Michiru Ōshima and Taku Takahashi – Mohōhan; Takashi Kako – Letters from the Mountains; Joe Hisaishi – Dolls	Mutsuo Naganuma – The Twilight Samurai; Masaharu Ueda – Letters from the Mountains; Yoshitaka Sakamoto – The Choice of Hercules; Akira Sakō – Ping Pong; Katsumi Yanagishima – Dolls
Outstanding Achievement in Lighting Direction	Outstanding Achievement in Art Direction
Gengon Nakaoka – The Twilight Samurai; Hideaki Yamakawa – Letters from the Mountains; Takeshi Ōkubo – The Choice of Hercules; Kōichi Watanabe – Ping Pong; Hitoshi Takaya – Dolls	Yoshinobu Nishioka and Mitsuo Degawa – The Twilight Samurai; Norihiro Isoda – Dolls; Kyōko Heya – The Choice of Hercules; Yoshirō Muraki and Tadashi Sakai – Letters from the Mountains; Shū Yamaguchi – Ryōma no Tsuma to Sono Aijin
Outstanding Achievement in Sound Recording	Outstanding Achievement in Film Editing
Kazumi Kishida – The Twilight Samurai; Osamu Onodera – Inochi; Jun Nakamura – The Choice of Hercules; Fumio Hashimoto – Mohōhan; Kenichi Benitani – Letters from the Mountains	Iwao Ishii – The Twilight Samurai; Hideto Aga – Letters from the Mountains; Sōichi Ueno – The Choice of Hercules; Sōichi Ueno – Ping Pong; Takuya Taguchi – Returner
Outstanding Foreign Language Film	Newcomer of the Year
Monster's Ball; I Am Sam; Gangs of New York; Harry Potter and the Chamber of Secrets; The Lord of the Rings: The Fellowship of the Ring	Min Tanaka – The Twilight Samurai; Kazushige Nagashima – Mr. Rookie; Nakamura Shidō II – Ping Pong; Manami Konishi – Letters from the Mountains; Anne Suzuki – Returner; Yūka – Koi ni Utaeba
Special Award of Honour from the Association	Special Award from the Chairman
Kaneto Shindo (Director)	Koreyoshi Kurahara (Director); Kinji Fukasaku (Director)
Special Award from the Association	
Takashi Ōnuma (Costume); Kouzu Shōkai Co.Ltd. and Takatsu Sousyokubijutu Co.Ltd. (Film Decoration Art)	
