= A Samurai Chronicle =

- Film poster
- Directed by: Takashi Koizumi
- Written by: Takashi Koizumi; Motomu Furuta
- Based on: Higurashi no Ki by Rin Hamuro
- Starring: Kōji Yakusho; Junichi Okada; Maki Horikita; Mieko Harada
- Music by: Takashi Kako
- Release date: 4 October 2014 (Japan)
- Running time: 129 minutes
- Country: Japan
- Language: Japanese

A Samurai Chronicle (Japanese: 蜩ノ記, Hepburn: Higurashi no Ki) is a 2014 Japanese jidaigeki drama film directed by Takashi Koizumi.

== Plot ==
A retired samurai must redeem himself for a crime that he committed earlier in his life. A squire is sent by the Prime Minister of Japan to keep watch over him.

== Cast ==
- Kōji Yakusho as Shūkoku Toda
- Junichi Okada as Shōzaburō Dan'no
- Maki Horikita as Kaoru Toda
- Mieko Harada as Orie Toda
- Shinobu Terajima
- Hisashi Igawa
- Kenichi Yajima

== Development ==
Teruyo Nogami, who was a longtime assistant of Akira Kurosawa, worked as a special adviser on the film, and joined the director and star for a question and answer session about the film.

The film was based on an award-winning novel by Rin Hamuro.

Koizumi claimed that he did not want to send any political messages with the film and instead intended to portray the real life events as accurately as possible.

== Reception ==
The film debuted at number two in the Japanese box office and grossed a total of $8,804,424 in Japan.

The Japan Times awarded the film a score of five out of ten, saying that the film failed to invoke the films of Akira Kurosawa that it was influenced by: "Though Koizumi and his veteran staff try to channel that sensibility, they are not Kurosawa, and though A Samurai Chronicle echoes the master’s work, it lacks his vivifying presence."
