= Teruyo Nogami =

Japanese Script Supervisor (born 1927)

- 野上照代
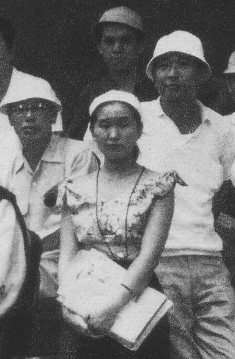
- Nogami standing in front of Takashi Shimura, Yoshirō Muraki and Akira Kurosawa during the making of Throne of Blood, taken in 1956.
- Born: 24 May 1927 (age 97); Tokyo, Japan
- Education: Kobe University
- Occupations: Script Supervisor; author
- Years active: 1950–2002
- Notable work: Rashomon; Ikiru; Letters from the Mountains
- Honours: Lifetime Achievement Award

Teruyo Nogami (Japanese: 野上照代, born 24 May 1927) is a Japanese film script supervisor and author. She is best known for her work on many of Akira Kurosawa's films, a partnership that began in 1950.

== Life and career ==
Nogami was born in Tokyo as the daughter of Iwao Nogami, a scholar of German literature and professor at Kobe University after the war. In 1943, she graduated from the Metropolitan Girls' School of Home Economics. She entered the library training school. In 1944, she graduated from the Library Training Institute, and took up a position at the former Yamaguchi High School Library in Yamaguchi Prefecture. After the war she returned to Tokyo and in 1946 she joined the People's Daily and in 1947 she joined Yakumo Shoten.

When she was a student circa 1941, she saw Mansaku Itami's Akanishi Kakita (1936) and wrote a fan letter to him. She became pen pals with the director. After Itami's death, Nogami became an apprentice script supervisor at Daiei's Kyoto Studio in 1949. She began her career as a script supervisor on Akira Nobuchi's Fukkatsu (1950). That year, she also participated in Akira Kurosawa's Rashomon as a script supervisor. In 1951, she moved to Toho and participated in all Kurosawa films after Ikiru as recording, editing and production assistant. In the meantime, she has also been enrolled in Sun Ad since 1966, and has also worked on commercial production. In 1979 she left the company. In 1984, she won the Yomiuri Human Documentary Award for Excellence for Requiem for Father, which depicts her childhood. In 2008, director Yoji Yamada turned this into a movie called Kabei: Our Mother.

== Filmography ==
- Rashomon (1950)
- Ikiru (1952) – script supervisor
- Seven Samurai (1954)
- Throne of Blood (1957)
- High and Low (1963)
- Red Beard (1965)
- Dodes'ka-den (1970) – script supervisor
- Dersu Uzala (1975)
- Kagemusha (1980) – associate producer
- Ran (1985) – production manager
- Dreams (1990) – production manager
- Rhapsody in August (1991)
- Madadayo (1993)
- After the Rain (2000)
- Letters from the Mountains (2002)

== Awards ==
- 5th Yomiuri "Female Human Documentary" Grand Prize, Excellence Award (for Requiem for Father, 1984)
- Fumiko Yamaji Distinguished Service Award
- 3rd Agency for Cultural Affairs Film Award, Film Achievement Award (2005)
- The 28th (2010) Kawakita Award
- The 34th Japan Academy Prize, Association Special Award (2011)
- 69th Mainichi Film Concours Special Award (2014)
- 2nd Kyoto International Film Festival Shozo Makino Award (2015)
- 94th Kinema Junpo Best Ten Special Award
- 35th Tokyo International Film Festival, Lifetime Achievement Award
