= List of best-selling albums of the 1980s (Japan) =

The following list indicates the best-selling albums from 1980 to 1989 on the Japanese Oricon chart. It is based on cumulative sales figures of three formats (on vinyl, audio cassette, and compact discs).

== Albums ==
Best-selling albums of the 1980s in Japan
Position	Album	Artist	Record label	Released	Peak position on chart(formats)
1	Reflections	Akira Terao	Toshiba EMI	April 1981	1 (LP/CT)
2	Thriller	Michael Jackson	Epic/Sony	December 1982	1 (LP/CT)
3	Delight Slight Light Kiss	Yumi Matsutoya	Toshiba EMI	November 1988	1 (CD)
4	Kishō Tenketsu	Chiharu Matsuyama	Canyon	November 1979	1 (LP/CT)
5	9.5 Carats	Yōsui Inoue	For Life	December 1984	1 (LP/CT)
6	Flashdance	Soundtrack	PolyStar	June 1983	1 (LP/CT)
7	Solid State Survivor	Yellow Magic Orchestra	Alfa	September 1979	1 (LP/CT)
8	A Long Vacation	Eiichi Ohtaki	CBS/Sony	March 1981	2 (LP)
9	Nude Man	Southern All Stars	Victor	July 1981	1 (LP/CT)
10	The Baddest	Toshinobu Kubota	CBS/Sony	October 1989	1 (CD)
11	Rebecca IV	Rebecca	CBS/Sony	November 1985	1 (LP/CT/CD)
12	Kamakura	Southern All Stars	Victor	September 1985	1 (LP/CT)
13	Such a Funky Thang!	Toshinobu Kubota	CBS/Sony	September 1988	1 (CD)
14	Hikaru Genji	Hikaru Genji	Pony Canyon	January 1988	1 (CD)
15	Greatest Hits Vol. 2	ABBA	Discomate	November 1979	1 (LP/CT)
16	Anzen Chitai IV	Anzen Chitai	Kitty	November 1985	1 (LP/CT/CD)
17	Shōwa	Tsuyoshi Nagabuchi	Toshiba EMI	March 1989	1 (CD)
18	Footloose	Soundtrack	CBS/Sony	April 1984	1 (LP)
19	Koibito yo	Mayumi Itsuwa	CBS/Sony	September 1980	1 (LP/CT)
20	Zettai Checkers	The Checkers	Pony Canyon	July 1984	1 (LP/CT)
21	Make It Big	Wham!	Epic/Sony	November 1984	1 (LP/CT)
22	Momentos	Julio Iglesias	Epic/Sony	October 1982	2 (LP)
23	Best II	Akina Nakamori	Warner/Pioneer	December 1988	1 (CD)
24	Request	Mariya Takeuchi	MMG	August 1987	1 (LP/CT/CD)
25	Dakishimetai	Anzen Chitai	Kitty	December 1984	1 (CT)
26	Best	Akina Nakamori	Warner/Pioneer	April 1986	1 (LP/CT/CD)
27	Kansuigyo	Miyuki Nakajima	Pony Canyon	March 1982	1 (LP/CT)
28	Before the Diamond Dust Fades...	Yumi Matsutoya	Toshiba EMI	December 1987	1 (CD)
29	Nippon no Rock Band	Kuwata Band	Victor	July 1986	1 (LP/CD/CT)
30	Motto! Checkers	The Checkers	Pony Canyon	December 1984	1 (LP/CT)
31	Time	Rebecca	CBS/Sony	October 1986	1 (LP/CT/CD)
32	Variation	Akina Nakamori	Warner/Pioneer	October 1982	1 (LP/CT)
33	Like a Virgin	Madonna	Warner/Pioneer	November 1984	2 (LP)
34	Kishō Tenketsu II	Chiharu Matsuyama	Pony Canyon	November 1984	1 (LP/CT)
35	Selection 1978-81	Off Course	Toshiba EMI	September 1981	1 (LP)
36	True Blue	Madonna	Warner/Pioneer	July 1986	1 (CD)
37	Memoir	Akina Nakamori	Warner/Pioneer	December 1983	1 (LP/CT)
38	Da Di Da	Yumi Matsutoya	Toshiba EMI	November 1985	1 (LP/CT/CD)
39	Supreme	Seiko Matsuda	CBS/Sony	June 1986	1 (LP/CT/CD)
40	Komeguny	Kome Kome Club	CBS/Sony	October 1987	3 (CD)
