= Akira Kurosawa bibliography =

A list of books and essays about Akira Kurosawa:

- Erens, Patricia (1979). Akira Kurosawa: a guide to references and resources. G. K. Hall. ISBN 978-0-8161-7994-7.
- Kurosawa, Akira (2008). Akira Kurosawa: Interviews. Univ. Press of Mississippi. ISBN 978-1-57806-997-2.
- Nogami, Teruyo (2006). Waiting on the Weather: Making Movies with Akira Kurosawa. Stone Bridge Press, Inc. ISBN 978-1-933330-09-9.
- Prince, Stephen (1999). The Warrior's Camera: The Cinema of Akira Kurosawa. Princeton University Press. ISBN 0-691-01046-3.
- Richie, Donald (1998). The Films of Akira Kurosawa. University of California Press. ISBN 978-0-520-22037-9.
- Yoshimoto, Mitsuhiro (2000). Kurosawa: Film Studies and Japanese Cinema. Duke University Press. ISBN 0-8223-2519-5.
