= Dreams (1990 film) =

1990 film by Akira Kurosawa

- Japanese theatrical release poster
- Directed by: Akira Kurosawa
- Written by: Akira Kurosawa
- Produced by: Hisao Kurosawa; Mike Y. Inoue
- Starring: Akira Terao; Mitsuko Baisho; Toshie Negishi; Mieko Harada; Chishu Ryu; Martin Scorsese
- Cinematography: Takao Saito; Shoji Ueda
- Edited by: Tome Minami
- Music by: Shin'ichirō Ikebe
- Production company: Akira Kurosawa USA
- Distributed by: Warner Bros.
- Release dates: May 10, 1990 (Cannes); May 25, 1990 (Japan); August 24, 1990 (United States)
- Running time: 119 minutes
- Countries: Japan; United States
- Language: Japanese
- Budget: ¥1.5 billion ($12 million)
- Box office: $3 million

Dreams (Japanese: 夢, Hepburn: Yume), also known as Akira Kurosawa's Dreams, is a 1990 magical realist anthology film of eight vignettes written and directed by Akira Kurosawa. Inspired by actual recurring dreams that Kurosawa had, it stars Akira Terao, Martin Scorsese, Chishū Ryū, Mieko Harada and Mitsuko Baisho. It marked Kurosawa's first film in 45 years of which he was the screenplay's sole author. An international co-production of Japan and the United States, Dreams was made five years after Ran, with assistance from George Lucas and Steven Spielberg, and funded by Warner Bros. The film was screened out of competition at the 1990 Cannes Film Festival, and has consistently received positive reviews.

Dreams addresses themes such as childhood, spirituality, art, death, and mistakes and transgressions made by humans against nature.

== Plot ==
The film does not have one narrative, but is episodic in nature, following the adventures of a "surrogate Kurosawa" through eight different segments, or "dreams", each one titled.

=== "Sunshine Through the Rain" ===
A young boy's mother tells him to stay at home during a day when the sun is shining through the rain, warning him that foxes have their weddings during such weather, and do not like to be seen. He defies her wishes, wandering into a forest where he witnesses the slow wedding procession of the foxes. He is spotted by them and runs home. His mother meets him at the front door, barring the way, and says that an angry fox came by the house, leaving behind a tantō knife. The mother gives the knife to the boy and tells him that he must go and beg forgiveness from the foxes, refusing to let him return home unless he does so. She warns that if he does not secure their forgiveness, he must take his own life. Taking the knife, the boy sets off into the mountains, towards the place under the rainbow where the foxes' home is said to be.

=== "The Peach Orchard" ===
In spring, on the day of Hinamatsuri (the Doll Festival), a boy spots a small girl dressed in pink in his house. He follows her outside to where his family's peach orchard once was. Living versions of the hina dolls appear before him on the orchard's slopes, and reveal themselves to be the spirits of the peach trees. Because the boy's family chopped down the trees of the orchard, the dolls berate him. However, after realizing that the boy loved the blossoms and did not want the trees to be felled, they agree to give him one last look at the orchard as it once was. They perform a dance to Etenraku that causes the blossoming trees to reappear. The boy sees the mysterious girl walking among the blooming trees and runs after her, but she and the trees suddenly vanish. He walks sadly through the thicket of stumps where the trees had been, until he sees a single young peach tree, in full bloom, sprouting where she stood.

=== "The Blizzard" ===
A group of four mountaineers struggle up a mountain path during a horrendous blizzard. It has been snowing for three days and the men are dispirited and ready to give up. One by one they stop walking, giving in to the snow and sure death. The leader endeavors to push on, but he too, stops in the snow. A strange woman (the yuki-onna of Japanese folklore) appears out of nowhere and attempts to lure the last conscious man into giving in to his death. He resists, shaking off his stupor and her entreaties, to discover that the storm has abated, and that their camp is only a few meters away.

=== "The Tunnel" ===
A discharged Japanese company commander is walking down a deserted road at dusk, on his way back home from fighting in the Second World War. He comes to a large concrete pedestrian tunnel, from which a barking and snarling anti-tank dog emerges. The commander walks through the dark tunnel and comes out on the other side. He is followed by the ghost of one of his soldiers, Private Noguchi, who had died of severe wounds in the commander's arms. Noguchi's face appears blue with blackened eyes.

Noguchi seems not to believe that he is dead. Noguchi points to a light emanating from a house on a nearby mountainside, which he identifies as his parents' home. He is heartbroken, knowing he cannot see them again, even while he remains respectful to the commander. Following the commander's wish that he accept his fate, Noguchi returns into the tunnel.

The commander's entire third platoon, led by a young lieutenant brandishing an officer's sword, then marches out of the tunnel. They come to a halt and present arms, saluting the commander. Their faces too are colored blue. The commander struggles to tell them that they are dead, having all been killed in combat, and that he himself is to blame for sending them into a futile battle. They stand mute in reply. The commander orders them to turn about face, and salutes them in a farewell as they march back into the tunnel. Collapsing in grief, the commander is quickly brought back to his feet by the reappearance of the anti-tank dog.

=== "Crows" ===
An art student finds himself inside the world of Vincent van Gogh's artwork, where he meets the artist in a field and converses with him. Van Gogh relates that his left ear gave him problems during a self-portrait, so he cut it off. The student loses track of the artist, and travels through a number of Van Gogh's works trying to find him, concluding with Van Gogh's Wheat Field with Crows.

=== "Mount Fuji in Red" ===
A large nuclear power plant near Mount Fuji has begun to melt down. The sky is filled with red fumes and millions of Japanese citizens flee in terror towards the ocean. Eventually, two men, a woman, and her two small children are seen alone at the edge of the sea. The older man, who is dressed in a business suit, explains to the younger man that the rest of the people have drowned themselves in the ocean. He then says that the different colors of the clouds billowing across the rubbish-strewn landscape signify different radioactive isotopes. According to him, red indicates plutonium-239, which can cause cancer; yellow indicates strontium-90, which causes leukemia; and purple indicates cesium-137, which causes birth defects. He then remarks about the foolish futility of color-coding such dangerous gases.

The woman, hearing these descriptions, recoils in horror before angrily cursing those responsible and the pre-disaster assurances of safety they had made. The suited man displays contrition, suggesting that he is in part responsible for the disaster. The other man, dressed casually, watches the multicolored radioactive clouds advance upon them. When he turns back towards the others at the shore, he sees the woman weeping: the suit-clad man has leaped to his death. A cloud of red dust reaches them, causing the mother to shrink back in terror. The remaining man attempts to shield the mother and her children by using his jacket to feebly fan away the radioactive billows.

=== "The Weeping Demon" ===
A man finds himself wandering around a misty, bleak mountainous terrain. He meets an oni-like being, who is actually a mutated human with a single horn on his head. The "demon" explains that there had been a nuclear holocaust which resulted in the loss of plants and animals, and in the aftermath the land is populated by towering dandelions taller than humans, deformed animals, and people sprouting horns. He elaborates that, by dusk, the horns cause them to feel excruciating pain; however, they cannot die, so they simply howl in agony during the night. Many of the "demons" were former millionaires and government officials, who are now suffering through a hell befitting for their sins.

The "demon" warns the man to flee, when the man asks where he should go to, the "demon" asks if he too wants to become a demon. The horrified man then runs away from the scene with the "demon" in pursuit.

=== "The Village of the Water Mills" ===
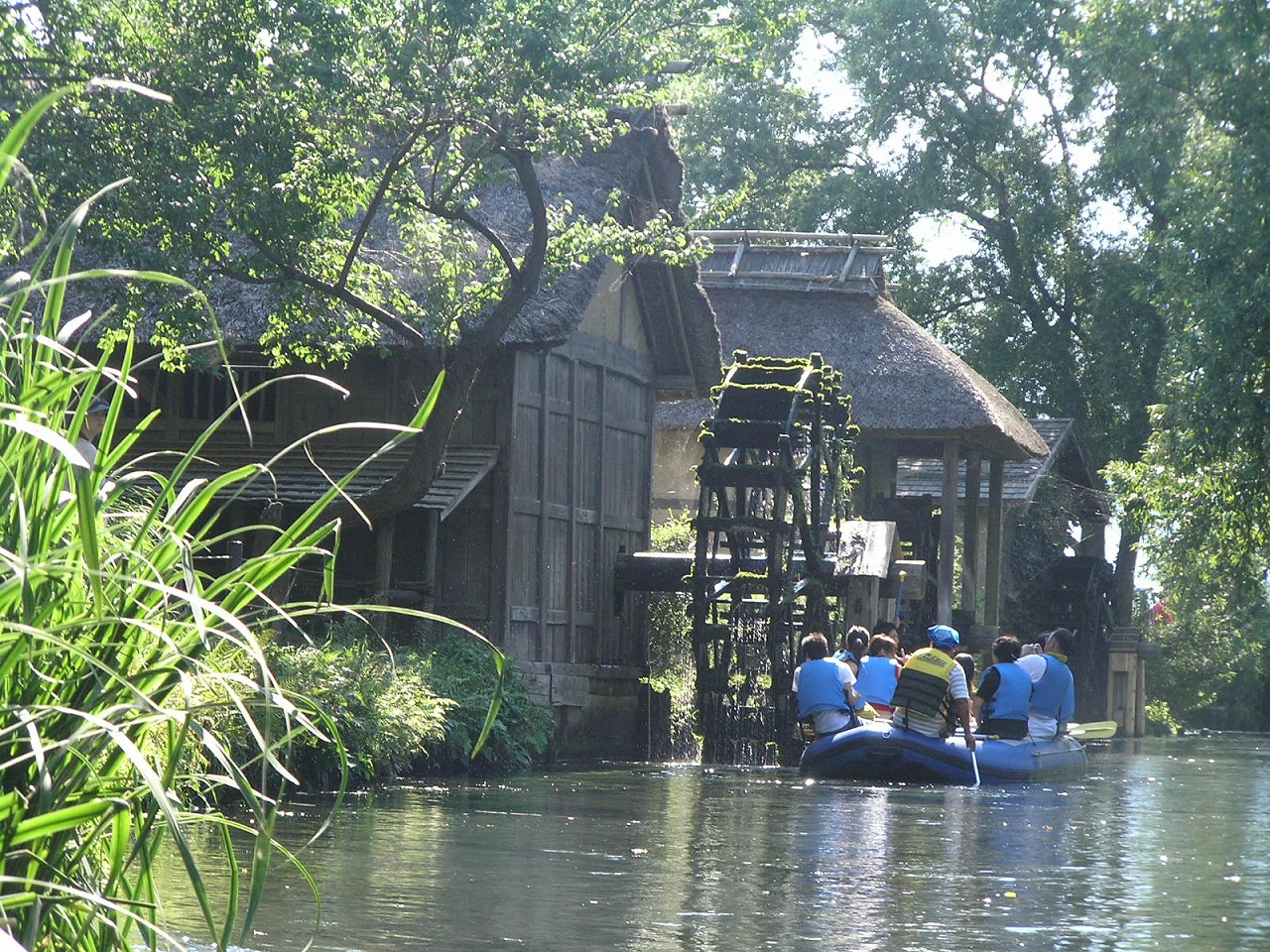
Water mills in the Daio Wasabi farm

A man enters a peaceful village amid flowing streams, where he sees children laying flowers on a large stone. He meets a wise old man who is fixing a broken water mill wheel. The elder informs the younger man that residents of the village simply refer to it as "the village", and that outsiders call it "the village of the water mills". When the younger man inquires about the lack of electricity in the village, the elder explains that the people of his village decided long ago to forsake modern technology, and laments the notion of modern convenience and the pollution of nature.

The younger man asks the elder about the stone which children were placing flowers on. The elder tells him that, long ago, an ailing traveler died on that spot. The villagers buried him there and placed the rock there as a headstone. Ever since, it has become customary in the village to offer flowers there. The younger man and the elder hear the sounds of a funeral procession for an old woman nearby. Rather than mourning her death, the people in the procession celebrate joyfully the peaceful end of her long life. The elder goes to join the procession, and the younger man leaves flowers on the stone before departing the village.

== Cast ==
The titles of roles have been adapted from The Criterion Collection.

- Akira Terao as I
  - Mitsunori Isaki as I as an adolescent ("The Peach Orchard")
  - Toshihiko Nakano as I as a young boy ("Sunshine Through the Rain")
- Mitsuko Baisho as Mother
- Mieko Harada as Snow woman
- Toshie Negishi as Woman carrying a child ("Mount Fuji in Red")
- Yoshitaka Zushi as Private Noguchi ("The Tunnel")
- Hisashi Igawa as Power-plant worker ("Mount Fuji in Red")
- Chosuke Ikariya as Weeping demon
- Chishu Ryu as Old man ("The Village of the Water Mills")
- Martin Scorsese as Vincent van Gogh
- Kiku-no Kai Dancers as Fox wedding dancers
- Misato Tate as Peach fairy
- Mieko Suzuki as Sister ("The Peach Orchard")
- Masayuki Yui as Member of the climbing team ("The Blizzard")
- Shu Nakajima as Member of the climbing team ("The Blizzard")
- Sakae Kimura as Member of the climbing team ("The Blizzard")
- Tessho Yamashita as Second lieutenant
- Members of the 20-ki No Kai as Third platoon

== Production ==
=== Writing and finance ===
Dreams is a series of eight vignettes based on director Akira Kurosawa's own dreams over the years. According to Teruyo Nogami, the film's production manager and Kurosawa's longtime collaborator, Kurosawa is the protagonist of each episode, in "one way or another". Written over the span of two months, it is the first produced screenplay that the director authored himself since 1945's The Men Who Tread on the Tiger's Tail. (Note: Bilge Ebiri writes that Dreams assistant director Takashi Koizumi was "consulted".) Assistant director Takashi Koizumi said that work on the screenplay for Dreams began in June or July 1986 in Gotemba, Shizuoka. Kurosawa would write from 9 a.m. to around 4 p.m. At Kurosawa's directive, Koizumi wrote a short piece titled "To Fly", but Koizumi said Kurosawa would completely rewrite everything and make it his own, except for stuff he was bad at; math for example, would be left as is. Koizumi suggested Kurosawa was influenced by Natsume Sōseki's Ten Nights of Dreams, a book the director liked and in which each story begins with "I had the following dream". He also gave the director Kunio Yanagita's The Legends of Tono and C.G. Jung's writings on dreams, which might have also been of use. Koizumi stated that he believes the sequences in the film incorporate more from Kurosawa's actual memories, than they do his dreams. He specifically mentioned "Sunshine Through the Rain" and how the little boy thinks he has to commit harakiri, and how Kurosawa's sister Momoyo was given a posthumous Buddhist name that uses the characters for "peach orchard" is reflected in "The Peach Orchard".

Despite coming off of the award-winning Dersu Uzala (1975) and Kagemusha (1980) and the critically acclaimed Ran (1985), Kurosawa had trouble financing the film. Rejected by his usual studio Toho, Bilge Ebiri wrote that many in the Japanese film industry knew Kurosawa's projects rarely turned a major profit, but also wrote the director knew that the studio heads were concerned about the film's "attack on the country's nuclear power program." American director Steven Spielberg, a fan of Kurosawa, helped get the director a deal with Warner Bros., while George Lucas, who previously helped Kurosawa finance Kagemusha, had his company Industrial Light & Magic (ILM) provide the special effects for Dreams at cost. The film is co-produced by Kurosawa's son, Hisao, and his nephew, Yasuo "Mike" Inoue. Ishirō Honda served as a creative consultant for the film. There is a misconception that Honda co-wrote or directed "The Tunnel". In actuality, Kurosawa had him instruct the actors in the segment on how to march and hold their guns due to his experience in the military. Costume designer Emi Wada was aided by Kurosawa's daughter, Kazuko.

=== Filming ===
Filming took place between January and August 1989, as Kurosawa wanted to incorporate as many of the four seasons as possible. Koizumi said Kurosawa liked to rehearse as soon as he arrived on set at 9 a.m. He also said the director preferred to shoot single takes if possible. "The Tunnel" has a 16-minute shot, which Kurosawa said must have been a world record considering a single film magazine only lasts 10 minutes, that ended only because lights placed on the backs of the soldiers would have been seen when the platoon does an about-face. Koizumi believes Kurosawa did not need many takes because he would edit the film in his head while shooting it.

For the "Sunshine Through the Rain" segment, the film's art director Yoshiro Muraki built a replica of Kurosawa's childhood home; the nameplate on the gate even reads "Kurosawa". During production, Kurosawa showed Mitsuko Baisho, the actress playing the mother, a photo of his own mother, and gave her tips on how to act as her. Nogami and the assistant director had initially thought that masks would work for the fox faces, but they did not at all so they had to use makeup, and Nogami called the makeup the hardest part. Kurosawa personally choreographed the foxes' movements. While the rainbow in the segment's final scene was added by ILM, every one of the artificial flowers was actually planted by the crew. Similarly, the peach petals in "The Peach Orchard" were scattered by hand and are not CGI. "The Blizzard" follows mountaineers who struggle up a mountain. Kurosawa previously confessed to being "a devotee of mountain climbing". Mieko Harada, who plays the snow woman in the sequence, also appears as an extra in "The Village of the Water Mills" with her infant child on her back.

In "Crows", Vincent van Gogh is portrayed by American filmmaker Martin Scorsese. When discussing who could play the Dutch painter with Francis Ford Coppola, Kurosawa said Scorsese was the only person who came to mind and asked him via a letter. In their brief prior meeting, Scorsese had expressed ideas to the Japanese director about "saving cinema", and Kurosawa said that is how he viewed Van Gogh. Scorsese later said he could not say no because it was Kurosawa, and took a break from making Goodfellas (1990) in order to be in Dreams. Scorsese's scenes were shot in a single day, and Nogami said he was extremely nervous because of how many lines he had. Scorsese himself described how he was given many meticulous instructions, and memorized them all despite his acting skills. Kurosawa was a fan of Van Gogh, both he and his wife liked The Letters of Vincent van Gogh, and he personally "touched up" many of the reproductions of his works seen in the exhibition scene. A year before filming, the crew had replanted a barley field with wheat in order to match Wheatfield with Crows. About 100 crows captured by locals in Hokkaido were kept in cages hidden in the field on either side of the frame and were released on a cue from Scorsese. According to Koizumi, music the birds are known to dislike was played in order to get them to fly within frame. A few crows were also added digitally. In a reference to the 1923 French film La Roue, the segment features Prelude No. 15 in D-flat major ("Raindrop") by Frédéric Chopin. "Crows" is the only segment in the film wherein the characters do not speak Japanese, but instead English and French.

"The Village of the Water Mills" segment was filmed at the Daio Wasabi farm in Nagano Prefecture. The colorful costumes worn by the villagers during a funeral procession are based on unusual clothes that Kurosawa saw in a remote northern village in his childhood. The idea of the stone in this segment, on which passersby lay flowers, was possibly inspired by a similar stone from Kurosawa's father's home village in Akita Prefecture:

Near the main thoroughfare of the village stood a huge rock, and there were always cut flowers on top of it. All the children who passed by it picked wild flowers and laid them atop the stone. When I wondered why they did this and asked, the children said they didn't know. I found out later by asking one of the old men in the village. In the Battle of Boshin, a hundred years ago, someone died at that spot. Feeling sorry for him, the villagers buried him, put the stone over the grave and laid flowers on it. The flowers became a custom of the village, which the children maintained without ever knowing why.

Nogami said Chishu Ryu struggled to memorize his 8 1/2 minutes of dialogue. She explained that although it was later edited into separate pieces, the dialogue was shot in a single take. The segment, and the film as a whole, ends with the director's stand-in walking out of the frame as "In the Village" from the Caucasian Sketches by Mikhail Ippolitov-Ivanov plays.

=== Cancelled sequences ===
Dreams was initially composed of 11 sequences, but was trimmed down to nine before filming began. Nearly three months into shooting, the ninth sequence was also abandoned. Nogami said this was due to the ninth segment and its on-location shooting in the United States being estimated to cost $3 million of the film's $14 million budget. Titled "A Wonderful Dream", the cancelled final sequence featured "I" having breakfast in a foreign hotel when he hears a loud commotion and turns on the television to see announcers from various countries reveal that humanity has staved off nuclear extinction with a global peace treaty having been signed. He looks out a window to see crowds of people throwing guns and other weapons into a pile while shouting for joy. In a move similar to the fourth wall-breaking scene of Kurosawa's One Wonderful Sunday (1947), the film was set to end with the viewing audience being called upon to join in with the applause. Coppola even gave Kurosawa some advice on how to save money for the long shots of crowds by cutting cork into human shapes and placing them in flowing water to simulate jostling and shoving. Nogami said Kurosawa found the idea interesting, but never actually tested it. With the scrapping of "A Wonderful Dream", "The Village of the Water Mills" segment was moved from sixth place, to the film's last. In an interview with Nobuhiko Obayashi, Kurosawa described another sequence he really wanted to make that featured the asura at Kōfuku-ji coming to life and juggling the Temple of the Golden Pavilion, Kiyomizu-dera and others while its three faces argue with each other, before deciding to watch the moon rise at Mount Wakakusa. But the director said the "issues of the Kyoto temples aren't global problems." Jim Bailey of the Los Angeles Times reported that another sequence was scrapped due to how much it would cost to use special effects to make people appear to be flying.

== Release and reception ==
Dreams was screened out of competition at the 1990 Cannes Film Festival on May 10, 1990. It opened in Japanese theaters that same month. The film debuted in New York and Los Angeles on August 24, 1990.

=== Home media ===
Dreams was released on DVD by Warner Home Video on two occasions: one on March 18, 2003, and the other on August 30, 2011, as part of the Warner Archive Collection.

The Criterion Collection released special editions of the film on Blu-ray and DVD on November 15, 2016, in the US. Both editions feature a new 4K restoration, headed by Lee Kline, technical director of the Criterion Collection, and supervised by one of the film's cinematographers, Shoji Ueda. Also included in the release is an on-set making-of documentary directed by Nobuhiko Obayashi called Making of "Dreams", which was filmed during its production, and Catherine Cadou's 2011 French documentary Kurosawa's Way. The Criterion edition was released in 4K Blu-ray with HDR on August 8, 2023.

=== Critical response ===
Vincent Canby of The New York Times gave the film a mostly positive review, writing: "It's something altogether new for Kurosawa, a collection of short, sometimes fragmentary films that are less like dreams than fairy tales of past, present and future. The magical and mysterious are mixed with the practical, funny and polemical."

The Encyclopedia of International Film praised Kurosawa in relation to Dreams as having "long been a master of complex narrative. Now he wants to tell what he does." It praised the editing and staging in the film as "hypnotically [serene]", and called Dreams "one of the most lucid dreamworks ever placed on film."

Donald Richie and Joan Mellen wrote of the film and of Kurosawa: "Beyond himself, he is beautiful because the beauty is in the attitude of the director. This is evident not only in the didactic approach, but also in the whole slowness, in the quantity of respect and in the enormous, insolent security of the work. That a director in 1990 could be so strong, so serious, so moral and so hopeful, is already beautiful."

On Rotten Tomatoes, the film has an approval rating of 66% based on 29 reviews, with an average rating of 6.60/10. The site's critics' consensus reads: "This late-career anthology by Akira Kurosawa often confirms that Dreams are more interesting to the dreamer than their audience, but the directorial master still delivers opulent visions with a generous dose of heart."
