= Reflections (Akira Terao album) =

Studio album by Akira Terao
- Released: 4 May 1981
- Genre: City pop, soft rock
- Label: Toshiba EMI

Reflections is a 1981 album by Akira Terao which was the best-selling album of the 1980s in Japan.

== Tracklist ==
All music was written by Akira Terao with arrangements by Akira Inoue.

Reflections track listing
No.	Title	Lyrics	Length
1.	"Habana Express"	Masako Arikawa	4:15
2.	"渚のカンパリ・ソーダ (Nagisa No Campari Soda)"	Takashi Matsumoto	4:33
3.	"喜望峰 (Kiboho)"	Takashi Matsumoto	4:14
4.	"二季物語 (Niki Monogatari)"	Masako Arikawa	8:07
5.	"ルビーの指環 (Ruby No Yubiwa)"	Takashi Matsumoto	4:21
6.	"Shadow City"	Masako Arikawa	4:26
7.	"予期せぬ出来事 (Yokisenu Dekigoto)"	Masako Arikawa	4:26
8.	"ダイヤルM (Dial M)"	Masako Arikawa	3:49
9.	"北ウィング (Kita Wing)"	Masako Arikawa	4:57
10.	"Sasurai"	Masako Arikawa	4:06
Total length:			47:14

== Charts ==
Chart performance for Reflections
Chart (2024)	Peak position
Japanese Hot Albums (Billboard Japan)	92

== See also ==
- 1981 in Japanese music
