= Lullaby of the Earth =

- DVD cover

Japanese name
- Kanji: 大地の子守歌
- Directed by: Yasuzo Masumura
- Screenplay by: Yoshio Shirasaka
- Produced by: Hiroaki Fujii
- Starring: Mieko Harada; Meiko Kaji
- Cinematography: Yoshihisa Nakagawa
- Edited by: Tatsuji Nakashizu
- Music by: Jiro Takemura
- Production company: Kodosha/Kimura Pro
- Distributed by: Shochiku
- Release date: June 12, 1976 (Japan)
- Running time: 111 minutes
- Country: Japan
- Language: Japanese

Lullaby of the Earth (Japanese: 大地の子守歌, Hepburn: Daichi no Komoriuta) is a 1976 Japanese film directed by Yasuzo Masumura.

== Plot ==
The story of an orphan girl, brought up in naive, rustic innocence by an elderly relative, who is suddenly exposed to the brutality, greed and deceptiveness of the outside world when her grandmother dies. Notwithstanding her healthy distrust of all strangers, which her upbringing instilled in her, it is not long before a cunning racketeer finds her weak point, that temptation which she cannot resist, that weakness, different as it may be, that each of us has, and brings her into his power. What follows is a depiction of her cruel descent into the depths of moral decay, as she becomes a collaborator in a system of exploitation, unbridled lust, vanity, and greed, in which she and other victims are always the losers.

== Cast ==
- Mieko Harada as Rin
- Eiji Okada
- Meiko Kaji
- Kinuyo Tanaka
- Natsuko Kahara as Rin's grandmother

== Awards and nominations ==
19th Blue Ribbon Awards

- Won: Best Film
- Won: Best Newcomer - Mieko Harada
