= Nomugi Pass =

1979 film

- Film poster
- Directed by: Satsuo Yamamoto
- Screenplay by: Yoshi Hattori
- Story by: Shigemi Yamamoto
- Produced by: Takero Ito; Kanji Mochimaru; Tokuko Miyaku
- Cinematography: Setsuo Kobayashi
- Edited by: Jun Nabeshima
- Music by: Masaru Sato
- Production company: Shin Neon Eiga Production
- Distributed by: Toho
- Release dates: June 9, 1979 (Japan); December 28, 1979 (United States)
- Running time: 153 minutes
- Country: Japan
- Language: Japanese

Nomugi Pass (Japanese: あゝ野麦峠, Hepburn: Aa Nomugi Tōge; lit. Ah, Nomugi Pass) is a 1979 Japanese film directed by Satsuo Yamamoto.

== Premise ==
An indictment of the treatment of Meiji period silkworkers by their employers and the Empire of Japan.

== Cast ==
- Shinobu Otake as Mine Masai
- Mieko Harada as Yuki Shinoda
- Chikako Yūri as Hana Mishima
- Yūko Kotegawa as Kiku Shoji
- Rentarō Mikuni as Tokichi Adachi

== Production ==
The film was one of the last made by director Satsuo Yamamoto and was followed by a 1982 sequel, his final work, Nomugi Pass II (Ā, Nomugi tōge: Shinryoku hen).

== Release ==
A roadshow version of the film was released in Japan on June 9, 1979 where it was distributed by Toho. It received a general release on June 30, 1979. The film was Toho's highest-grossing film of the year and was the second highest grossing among domestic releases.

The film was released in the United States with English subtitles by Toho International on December 28, 1979.

== Reception ==
At the 34th Mainichi Film Awards, Nomugi Pass won for Best Film, Best Cinematography, Best Art Direction and Best Score. At the Japanese Academy Awards, the film won the award for Best Sound, and Best Music Score (Masaru Sato).

== Footnotes ==
=== References ===
- Galbraith IV, Stuart (2008). The Toho Studios Story: A History and Complete Filmography. Scarecrow Press. ISBN 978-1461673743.
- Jacoby, Alexander (2008). A Critical Handbook of Japanese Film Directors. Berkeley: Stone Bridge Press. ISBN 978-1-933330-53-2.
