= The Professor's Beloved Equation (film) =

- Japanese film poster
- Directed by: Takashi Koizumi
- Written by: Takashi Koizumi (screenplay); Yōko Ogawa (novel)
- Produced by: Miyako Araki; Tsutomu Sakurai
- Starring: Akira Terao; Eri Fukatsu; Takanari Saito
- Cinematography: Hiroyuki Kitazawa; Masaharu Ueda
- Edited by: Hideto Aga
- Music by: Takashi Kako
- Release date: January 21, 2006 (Japan)
- Running time: 117 minutes
- Country: Japan
- Language: Japanese
- Budget: $5,000,000 (estimated)

The Professor's Beloved Equation (Japanese: 博士の愛した数式) is a Japanese film released January 21, 2006 and directed by Takashi Koizumi. It is based on the novel The Housekeeper and the Professor, written by Yōko Ogawa.

== Background ==
In contrast to the original work, which is told from the perspective of the narrator, the film is shown from the perspective of a 29-year-old Root as he recounts his memories of the professor to a group of new pupils. Though there are a few differences between the film and the original work (for example, the movie touches on the relationship between the professor and the widow while the book does not give much detail), the film is generally faithful to the original.

== Cast ==
- Akira Terao as Professor
- Eri Fukatsu as Kyoko
- Takanari Saito as Root
- Hidetaka Yoshioka as Teacher (Root after age 19)
- Ruriko Asaoka as the widow

== Staff ==
- Original story by: Yōko Ogawa (Published by Shinchosha)
- Directed by: Takashi Koizumi
- Written by: Takashi Koizumi
- Produced by: Miyako Araki, Tsutomu Sakurai
- Cinematography: Hiroyuki Kitazawa, Masaharu Ueda
- Artwork: Ken Sakei
- Sound: Benitani Sen'ichi
- Lighting: Hideaki Yamakawa
- Wardrobe: Kazuko Kurosawa
- Music by: Takashi Kako
- Distributed by: Asmik Ace Entertainment
