= Returner =

2002 film by Takashi Yamazaki

- Theatrical release poster

Japanese name
- Katakana: リターナー
Transcriptions
- Revised Hepburn: Ritānā
- Directed by: Takashi Yamazaki
- Screenplay by: Takashi Yamazaki; Kenya Hirata
- Visual effects by: Takashi Yamazaki; Atsuki Sato; Kiyoko Shibuya
- Produced by: Shūji Abe; Chikahiro Ando; Toru Horibe; Akifumi Takuma
- Starring: Anne Suzuki; Takeshi Kaneshiro; Goro Kishitani
- Cinematography: Kōzō Shibasaki; Akira Sakō
- Edited by: Takuya Taguchi
- Music by: Akihiko Matsumoto
- Production company: Robot
- Distributed by: Toho
- Release dates: August 19, 2002 (Shibuya); August 31, 2002 (Japan)
- Running time: 116 minutes
- Country: Japan
- Languages: Japanese; English; Mandarin
- Budget: $4 million
- Box office: $11 million

Returner (Japanese: リターナー, Hepburn: Ritānā) is a 2002 Japanese science fiction action film directed, co-written, and with visual effects by Takashi Yamazaki. It stars Takeshi Kaneshiro and Anne Suzuki as a hitman and time traveler, respectively, who team up in present-day Japan to prevent an alien race from invading Earth. Goro Kishitani and Kirin Kiki are featured in supporting roles.

Production took place from circa January to April 2002. It reportedly aspired "to be a combination of Mission: Impossible, The Matrix and Leon", and exercised 300 computer-generated shots, as well as wire fu. The film was produced by Robot Communications and was funded by Robot, Toho, Fuji Television Network, Amuse Pictures, Shirogumi, and Imagica.

Returner premiered at Shibuya Public Hall on August 19, 2002, and was released in Japan on August 31. Samuel Goldwyn Films later distributed it in the United States on October 17, 2003. The film grossed over $11 million worldwide against a $4 million budget and was the fourteenth highest-grossing Japanese film of 2002. It received generally negative reviews from critics, with most attacking the screenplay and perceived lack of originality, although some praised the acting, action sequences, and visual effects. The film received five nominations at the 26th Japan Academy Film Prize. A sequel was planned but ultimately abandoned.

== Plot ==
Milly is a soldier from 2084, when humanity is on the verge of extinction from a losing war with an alien race known as the "Daggra". (Note: "Daggra" is Lhasa Tibetan for "enemy".) In mankind's final stronghold in Tibet, Milly leaps into a newly built time portal just before the fortress is overrun. The portal sends her to 2002, where her mission is to kill the first Daggra, who faked a crash landing, and stop it from signaling its invasion fleet.

Milly lands in the aftermath of a shootout in Tokyo Bay, where a hitman named Miyamoto holds the murderous Triad mobster Mizoguchi at gunpoint. Miyamoto has a personal score to settle with Mizoguchi, who killed his childhood friend by kidnapping him and selling off his organs. Milly's arrival allows the mobster to escape and Miyamoto takes Milly, whom he thinks he accidentally shot, back to his place. She reveals a plate of metal in her coat that stopped the bullet. To get Miyamoto to work with her on her mission, Milly places a magnet therapy patch on his neck and makes him believe it is an explosive.

That night, Miyamoto sees Milly cleaning up his trench coat on a coat hanger, so he tells her to go back to sleep. The next morning he discovers photos of himself and a newspaper article on his death. He shows these to his weapons supplier Shi Zhi Tang, who tells him it is an elaborate trick the Triads would not waste their time on.

With Shi's help, Miyamoto and Milly track down the spaceship's crash site, but it has been taken away to the National Institute of Space Science. As the duo arrive at the NISS building, Mizoguchi and his goons take over the facility. Miyamoto and Milly discover the alien, but is confused by its weakened state. The alien uses Miyamoto as its mouthpiece to say it wants to go home. Milly realizes that mankind started the war by capturing and killing the alien, and that they must stop Mizoguchi from acquiring the alien technology and selling it to the black market. Following the destruction of the NISS lab, Mizoguchi and his goons take the alien and its ship. Meanwhile, Miyamoto and Milly regroup for the next part of her mission.

The duo again confronts Mizoguchi at an abandoned oil rig, where they rescue the alien. Surviving a huge explosion, a bloodied Mizoguchi threatens to kill them all for ruining his plans. However, his bullets hit an invisible force field, giving Miyamoto an opportunity to kill Mizoguchi. Before they can figure out where the force field came from, a Daggra craft, disguised as a Boeing 747-400 airliner arrives, having received the alien's distress signal. The Daggra take their wounded comrade and leave Earth. As the future war has ceased to exist, Milly slowly disappears.

Shortly after the incident, Miyamoto decides to give up his life of violence and hands in his guns to Shi. While walking home, he is confronted by a thug whose life he had spared earlier at Tokyo Bay. Realizing that he is weaponless, Miyamoto is helpless as the thug shoots him. The thug walks away, assuming that Miyamoto is dead. Soon after, Miyamoto staggers up and finds a plate of metal similar to Milly's saved his life. The plate has a written message by Milly, telling him she has repaid him. Miyamoto recalls the night Milly messed around with his trench coat. While Miyamoto and Milly were asleep, a second Milly traveled from the future and slipped the metal plate into his trench coat before returning to her timeline. On her way out, she accidentally dropped the newspaper article on Miyamoto's death.

== Cast ==
- Takeshi Kaneshiro as Miyamoto (ミヤモト), a hitman known as a "Returner", who disrupts illegal transactions and recovers black money.

- Kanata Hongō as young Miyamoto

- Anne Suzuki as Milly (ミリ), a 14-year-old girl from the future sent to 2002 Japan to prevent the cause of the alien war that destroyed her timeline.
- Goro Kishitani as Mizoguchi (溝口), a mobster who works for the Liu Group triad.
- Kirin Kiki as Shi Zhi Tang (謝), an elderly Chinese antique shop owner who is Miyamoto's informant and arms dealer.
- Masaya Takahashi as Liu Laoban (劉老板), head of the Liu Group triad.
- Kisuke Iida as Karasawa (唐沢), a subordinate of Mizoguchi.
- Yukiko Okamoto as Dr. Yagi (八木博士, Yagi Hakase), a scientist at the National Institute of Space Science.
- Kazuya Shimizu as Murakami (村上), a physically strong subordinate of Mizoguchi.
- Dean Harrington as Dr. Brown (ブラウン博士, Buraun Hakase), a scientist in the future who invented the time portal and Milly's Sonic Mover device.
- Mitsu Murata as Mizoguchi's henchman (溝口の手下, Mizoguchi no teshita), who is shot in the leg by Miyamoto.
- Chiharu Kawai as Liu's interpreter (劉の通訳, Ryū no tsūyaku)
- Hōshi Ishida as Xi Fan (シーファン, Shīfan), Miyamoto's childhood friend who was abducted and killed by Mizoguchi.

Patrick Harlan makes a cameo appearance as an American newscaster.

== Production ==
On January 12, 2002, Screen Daily reported that production on Returner had begun and would wrap in April of the same year. According to a publicist, the film pursued "to be a combination of Mission: Impossible, The Matrix and Leon". It had 300 computer-generated cuts and alleged "state-of-the-art" wire fu. Robot Communications produced it on an estimated ¥450 million ($4 million) budget, and funded it with Toho, Fuji Television Network, Amuse Pictures, Shirogumi, and Imagica.

== Soundtrack ==
Returner: Original Soundtrack

Soundtrack album by Akihiko Matsumoto
- Released: August 21, 2002
- Studios: Studio Lights; Sound Inn
- Genre: Film score
- Length: 51:29
- Label: Toshiba EMI
- Producer: Akihiko Matsumoto

The film's soundtrack was composed by Akihiko Matsumoto, released by Toshiba EMI on August 21, 2002. Not included in the soundtrack album is the ending theme "Dig In" by Lenny Kravitz.

=== Track listing ===
All music is composed by Akihiko Matsumoto.

| No. | Title | Length |
|---|---|---|
| 1. | "The Annihilated World" | 1:07 |
| 2. | "Destroy: Theme of Returner" (DESTROY ~リターナーのテーマ) | 4:14 |
| 3. | "Sounds of Death" | 0:46 |
| 4. | "The Ringleader" | 1:55 |
| 5. | "Xi-Huan" | 3:04 |
| 6. | "The Annihilated World Against 'Daggra'" | 6:13 |
| 7. | "Extravehicular Crisis" | 5:04 |
| 8. | "Sparks" | 4:37 |
| 9. | "Take Me to the Place - Part 1" | 2:33 |
| 10. | "Magnet Bang" | 3:10 |
| 11. | "Human Riddle" | 1:47 |
| 12. | "Liu" | 2:40 |
| 13. | "The Sun of My Diamond" | 3:02 |
| 14. | "Mother Earth" | 6:02 |
| 15. | "Take Me to the Place - Part 2" | 2:04 |
| 16. | "Good Bye, Milly" | 3:03 |
| Total length: | | 51:29 |

== Release ==
=== Theatrical ===
Returner had its worldwide premiere at Shibuya Public Hall on August 19, 2002, where it was reportedly attended by 2,000 people and the key cast members also gave a "stage greeting". Toho released distributed the film theatrically in Japan on August 31. It was later screened at the 15th Tokyo International Film Festival on October 30, with English subtitles.

As far back as January of that year, Pony Canyon were set to handle the film's international distribution. On August 1, 2002, the official website announced that Columbia TriStar would be responsible for releasing the film overseas. Nevertheless, Pony Canyon would be credited for the film's international release and it eventually received a theatrical release in the United States with English subtitles on October 17, 2003, through Destination Films and Samuel Goldwyn Films.

Toho released a 4K remaster of the film on a limited theatrical run in Japan on November 29, 2024, to commemorate the 25th anniversary of Yamazaki's directorial career.

=== Home media ===
On March 7, 2003, Amuse Pictures released Standard and Deluxe editions of the film simultaneously on DVD.

Overseas, the film was released on DVD in the UK by Columbia TriStar Home Entertainment in 2002 and in the U.S. by Sony Pictures Home Entertainment on February 10, 2004.

== Reception ==
=== Box office ===
Returner was a box office hit, becoming the fourteenth highest-grossing Japanese film of 2002. It premiered at number one in the Japanese box office on its release, beating The Cat Returns, Star Wars: Episode II – Attack of the Clones and Resident Evil. Overall, the film grossed ¥1.29 billion ($11 million) in Japan, $73,060 in the United States, and $340,920 in Hong Kong, making its global box office total approximately $11,413,980.

=== Critical response ===
Returner received generally negative reviews. On the review aggregator website Rotten Tomatoes, 38% of 34 critics' reviews are positive, with an average rating of 4.50/10. Metacritic, which uses a weighted average, assigned the film a score of 36 out of 100, based on 17 critics, indicating "generally unfavorable" reviews.

Derek Elley of Variety wrote in his review that "Kaneshiro is all long flowing locks and smoldering disdain, the visual F/X are only so-so, and pacing [sic] is almost brisk enough to hide the plot holes." Don Willmott of Filmcritic.com gave the film 2 out of 5 stars, calling it "a watchable, if somewhat absurd, sci-fi stir fry." Elvis Mitchell of The New York Times said that "A smorgasbord that seems to have been picked out of a Dumpster. It clumsily combines a fish-out-of-water story with bits lifted from sources including the Terminator movies, Star Wars, Starman, Close Encounters, a couple of Pink Floyd albums and H. G. Wells."

On the positive side, Jo Berry of Empire gave the film 3 out of 5 stars, saying, "So much of this film is 'borrowed' it's like watching a chirpy tribute band. Good fun." Peter Hartlaub of the San Francisco Chronicle offered qualified praise, but also noted that "only subtitles and a few borrowed ideas from the Japan-born video game Metal Gear Solid prevent the movie from looking like an American Film Institute clip show". Since the film features a lack of originality, as Hartlaub pointed out, it "must rely on the strength of its actors, and they're excellent across the board". Manohla Dargis said in her review for the Los Angeles Times: "Like all good B-movies, Returner comes loaded with enough eccentric touches to give the recycling a whiff of freshness and, as is often the case with many above-par follies, it's the cast that takes the whole thing to another level." Jae-ha Kim gave it a 3/4 rating, calling it "stylish" but even so noted that "we see elements of films we've seen before".

=== Accolades ===
| Award | Date of ceremony | Category | Recipient(s) | Result | Ref. |
|---|---|---|---|---|---|
| Japan Academy Film Prize | March 7, 2003 | Popularity Award | Anne Suzuki | Won | |
| Japan Academy Film Prize | March 7, 2003 | Outstanding Performance by an Actor in a Supporting Role | Gorō Kishitani | Nominated | |
| Japan Academy Film Prize | March 7, 2003 | Outstanding Performance by an Actress in a Supporting Role | Kirin Kiki | Nominated | |
| Japan Academy Film Prize | March 7, 2003 | Outstanding Achievement in Film Editing | Takuya Taguchi | Nominated | |
| Japan Academy Film Prize | March 7, 2003 | Newcomer of the Year | Anne Suzuki | Nominated | |

== Proposed sequel ==
Yamazaki planned a sequel to the film after its release, but encountered some difficulties. Thus, producer Shūji Abe insisted Yamazaki make a period piece set during the Shōwa era instead, as he had always wanted to produce such a project. This ultimately led to the creation of Yamazaki's third film, Always: Sunset on Third Street (2005), which was called a "milestone" in the usage of computer-generated imagery in Japanese cinema by film critic Tadao Sato.

In December 2023, Yamazaki expressed interest in making a sequel to Returner though he feels "too old" to write it.

== Bibliography ==
- Galbraith IV, Stuart (2008). The Toho Studios Story: A History and Complete Filmography. Scarecrow Press. ISBN 978-1461673743.
