= Takashi Koizumi =

Japanese film director

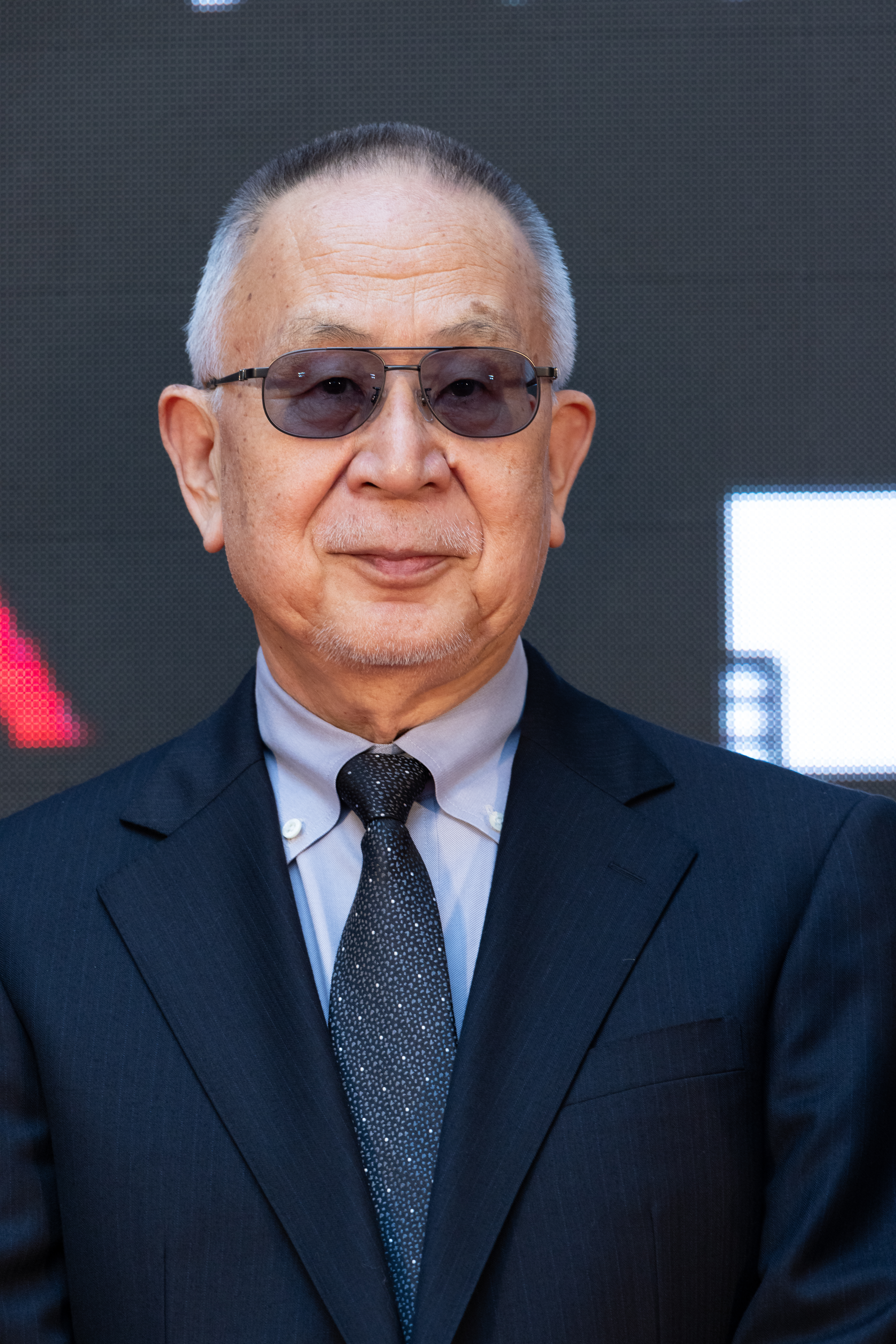
2024

Takashi Koizumi (小泉堯史 Koizumi Takashi) (born November 6, 1944, in Mito) is a Japanese film director. After graduating from Waseda University, he served as an assistant director for Akira Kurosawa for many years.

== Filmography ==
Release date	Year	Notes
Vietnam ベトナム	1969	Co-director with Satsuo Yamamoto and Kentarō Masuda
Number Ten Blues ナンバーテン・ブルース さらばサイゴン	1975	Assistant director
Ran 乱	1985	Assistant director
Akira Kurosawa's Dreams 夢 Yume	1990	Assistant director
Rhapsody in August 八月の狂詩曲; Hachigatsu no Kyosokyoku	1991	Assistant director
Madadayo まだだよ	1993	Assistant director
After the Rain 雨あがる; Ame Agaru	1999	
Letters from the Mountains 阿弥陀堂だより; Amidadō Dayori	2002	
The Professor and his Beloved Equation 博士の愛した数式; Hakase no Aishita Sushiki	2006	
Best Wishes for Tomorrow 明日への遺言; Asueno Yuigon	2007	
A Samurai Chronicle 蜩ノ記; Higurashi no Ki	2014	
Samurai's Promise 散り椿; Chiri Tsubaki	2018	Screenplay
The Pass: Last Days of the Samurai 峠 最後のサムライ; Tōge Saigo no Samurai	2022	
Snowflowers: Seeds of Hope 雪の花 –ともに在りて– Yuki no Hana –Tomo ni Arite–	2025	

== Awards ==
=== Nominations ===
- AFI Fest 1999:
  - Grand Jury Prize for After the Rain
- 24th Japan Academy Film Prize (2001)
  - Best Director for After the Rain
- 26th Japan Academy Film Prize (2003)
  - Best Director for Letters from the Mountains
  - Best Screenplay for Letters from the Mountains

=== Won ===
- Venice International Film Festival 1999:
  - CinemAwenire Award in Best Film on the Relationship of Man-Nature for After the Rain
- São Paulo International Film Festival 1999:
  - Mostra Special Award for After the Rain
- Portland International Film Festival 2001:
  - Audience Award for Best First Film: After the Rain
- 27th Fajr International Film Festival 2009 (Eastern Vista section):
  - Best Screenplay for Best Wishes for Tomorrow
