= Hisashi Igawa =

Japanese actor (born 1936)

- Born: 17 November 1936 (age 89); Mukden, Manchukuo (present day Shenyang, China)
- Occupation: Actor
- Years active: 1955–present

Hisashi Igawa (井川比佐志; born 17 November 1936) is a Japanese actor who has appeared in such films as Akira Kurosawa's Dodesukaden, Ran and Madadayo. He starred in Abe Kōbō's production of The Man Who Turned Into A Stick, a surrealist play, in 1969.

== Selected filmography ==
=== Film ===
Year	Film	Role	Notes	Ref.
1962	Harakiri	Retainer		
1962	Pitfall	A miner	Lead role	
1966	The Face of Another	Man with Mole		
1966	Zatoichi's Pilgrimage	Eigoro		
1969	Goyokin	Takeuchi Shinjiro		
1970	Where Spring Comes Late	Seiichi Kazami		
1970	Dodes'ka-den	Masuo Masuda		
1970	Tora-san's Runaway	Tsuyoshi Kimura		
1972	Summer Soldiers			
1975	The Fossil	Funazu		
1975	The Gate of Youth	Park		
1976	Fumō Chitai			
1977	The Far Road			
1978	Double Suicide of Sonezaki			
1979	Gassan	Iwazo		
1985	Ran	Shuri Kurogane		
1985	Tampopo	Running Man		
1986	Lost in the Wilderness	Osamu Uemura		
1987	Hachiko Monogatari	Maekawa		
1988	Tokyo: The Last Megalopolis	Ryokichi Tagami		
1990	Dreams	Nuclear Plant Worker		
1990	Boiling Point	Otomo		
1991	Rhapsody in August	Tadao		
1992	Luminous Moss	prosecutor		
1993	Madadayo	Takayama		
1998	Bullet Ballet	Kudo		
2000	After the Rain	Kihei Ishiyama		
2002	Letters from the Mountains			
2004	Half a Confession	Keiichi Fujibayashi		
2005	Yamato	The Chairman		
2006	The Professor's Beloved Equation	Housekeeper Agent		
2009	Mt. Tsurugidake	Nagamaru Saeki		
2010	Villain			
2015	Have a Song on Your Lips			
2022	The Pass: Last Days of the Samurai			

=== Television ===
Year	Title	Role	Notes	Ref.
1983	Tokugawa Ieyasu	Okuhara Shinjūrō	Taiga drama	

== Honours ==
- Medal with Purple Ribbon (2002)
- Order of the Rising Sun, 4th Class, Gold Rays with Rosette (2008)
