= Kurosawa's Way =

2011 French documentary film

- French film poster for Kurosawa's Way
- Directed by: Catherine Cadou
- Written by: Catherine Cadou
- Produced by: Michiko Yoshitake
- Starring: Theodoros Angelopoulos; Bernardo Bertolucci; Clint Eastwood; Alejandro G. Iñárritu; Bong Joon Ho; Mohammad Khalkhalian; Abbas Kiarostami; Hayao Miyazaki; Martin Scorsese; Julie Taymor; Shin'ya Tsukamoto; John Woo
- Narrated by: Catherine Cadou
- Cinematography: Alexis Kavyrchine; Simon Beaufils; Tsuneo Azuma; Tempei Iwakiri; Yoshihiro Ikeuchi
- Edited by: Cedric Defert
- Distributed by: The Criterion Collection
- Release date: 2011 (Cannes Film Festival)
- Running time: 52 minutes
- Country: France
- Languages: French; English; Japanese; Cantonese; Persian; Korean; Persian

Kurosawa's Way (French: Kurosawa, la voie) is a 2011 French documentary directed and written by Catherine Cadou. The film features 11 major filmmakers from Asia, America and Europe as they discuss how the films of Japanese director Akira Kurosawa influenced them.

== Synopsis ==
Kurosawa's Way is a documentary that is intercut with Catherine Cadou's narration on her own experiences with Kurosawa, and interviews with various directors and archival photographs. The directors' interviews focus on both philosophical and technical observations of Kurosawa's films.

== Interviewees ==
- Bernardo Bertolucci
- Julie Taymor
- Theo Angelopoulos
- Alejandro González Iñárritu
- Abbas Kiarostami
- Shin'ya Tsukamoto
- Hayao Miyazaki
- John Woo
- Martin Scorsese
- Clint Eastwood
- Bong Joon-ho

== Release ==
The film was shown at the 2011 Cannes Film Festival and the 24th Tokyo International Film Festival. The documentary was released on the Blu-ray and DVD by the Criterion Collection as part of their release of Kurosawa's film Dreams.

== Reception ==
Variety praised the film, referring to it as "Meticulously crafted" and "engrossing".
