= Yoake no Machi de =

- Theatrical release poster
- Directed by: Setsurō Wakamatsu
- Screenplay by: Izumi Kawasaki
- Based on: Yoake no Machi de by Keigo Higashino
- Produced by: Hikaru Suzuki; Kazunori Okada; Tadahisa Sakamoto
- Starring: Gorō Kishitani; Kyoko Fukada; Tae Kimura; Ken Ishiguro; Masaya Kikawada
- Cinematography: Takahiro Tsutai
- Edited by: Takao Arai
- Music by: Norihito Sumitomo
- Production company: Kadokawa Daiei Studio
- Release date: October 8, 2011 (Japan)
- Running time: 129 minutes
- Country: Japan
- Language: Japanese

Yoake no Machi de (Japanese: 夜明けの街で), also known as Before Sunrise or In the City of Dawn, is a 2011 Japanese film directed by Setsurō Wakamatsu, based on the novel of the same name by Keigo Higashino.

== Cast ==
- Gorō Kishitani
- Kyoko Fukada
- Tae Kimura
- Ken Ishiguro
- Masaya Kikawada
- Ken Tanaka
- Hisako Manda
- Masatoshi Nakamura
