= Madadayo =

- Theatrical Release Poster
- Directed by: Akira Kurosawa
- Screenplay by: Akira Kurosawa; Ishiro Honda
- Based on: Literary works by Hyakken Uchida
- Produced by: Hisao Kurosawa
- Starring: Tatsuo Matsumura; Kyōko Kagawa; Hisashi Igawa; George Tokoro
- Cinematography: Takao Saito; Shoji Ueda
- Music by: Shinichiro Ikebe
- Production companies: Daiei; Dentsu, Inc.; Kurosawa Production
- Distributed by: Toho
- Release date: 17 April 1993 (Japan)
- Running time: 134 minutes
- Country: Japan
- Language: Japanese
- Budget: ¥1.3 billion
- Box office: ¥300 million

Madadayo (Japanese: まあだだよ, Hepburn: Mādadayo; lit. "Not Yet") is a 1993 Japanese comedy-drama film. It is the thirtieth and final film to be completed by Akira Kurosawa before his death. It was screened out of competition at the 1993 Cannes Film Festival. The film was selected as the Japanese entry for the Best Foreign Language Film at the 66th Academy Awards, but was not accepted as a nominee.

== Plot ==
The film is based on the life of Japanese academic and author Hyakken Uchida (1889–1971). While playfully teaching a class as a professor of German in the period immediately before the Second World War, Uchida tearfully announces his retirement to his crestfallen students. In 1943, he moves into a spacious house, but his wife is concerned about the safety of the neighborhood. Two students arrive to pretend to burglarize the home, but instead find a series of directions written by Uchida on how to break in to the house.

He hosts a dinner for several of his students, but as a result of wartime shortages he is embarrassed that he and his wife can only serve venison and horse meat. Their house burns down as a result of U.S. bombing raids, and Uchida and his wife are forced to live in a small shack with no indoor toilet with their few remaining possessions.

After the end of the war, his former students get together to host a banquet to honor him. Asked several times whether he is ready to die, he replies repeatedly, "Not yet", so naturally the banquet is named the "Not Yet Banquet". At the end of the raucous celebration, two American military policemen arrive but smile after they see that everyone is enjoying themselves.

With the help of his students, he builds a new house for himself and his wife with a pond that has a small island in the middle. A stray alley cat arrives and he eventually adopts the cat, aptly naming it Nora (from "Nora neko", meaning "alley cat" in Japanese).

The lot across from the couple is purchased by a developer who wants to build a 3-story house, but the landowner refuses the sale, as it would block the sunlight for the professor and his wife. Uchida's students get together to purchase the lot in secret.

Nora disappears during a storm, which causes Uchida to become heartbroken and sink into a deep depression. He conducts numerous searches, enlisting his students, local schools, and the townspeople, but aside from several false leads, Nora is never seen again. Soon after, another cat appears. He names it Kurz (German for "short") and, with the new cat, his depression lifts.

His former students hold the seventeenth Not Yet Banquet. No longer an all-men's affair, children of his students present him with flowers, and the students' grandchildren present him with a large cake. After receiving the cake and giving his remarks, he collapses from arrhythmia. After being taken home to rest, he falls asleep and dreams of playing hide-and-seek as a child. The other children keep asking if he's ready while he is looking for a place to hide and he replies, "not yet". He finally finds a place to hide, and in so doing, looks out toward a golden sun.

Many of the movie's vignettes, like the search for a missing cat and the time Uchida spent in a one-room hut after his home was destroyed in a bombing raid, come from Uchida's own writings, but the movie also gives Kurosawa the chance to comment on aspects of modern Japanese history like the American occupation of Japan that he had only been able to explore indirectly in his earlier works.

== Cast ==
- Tatsuo Matsumura – Professor Hyakken Uchida
- Kyōko Kagawa – Professor's Wife
- Hisashi Igawa – Takayama
- George Tokoro – Amaki
- Masayuki Yui – Kiriyama
- Akira Terao – Sawamura
- Takeshi Kusaka – Dr. Kobayashi
- Asei Kobayashi – Rev. Kameyama
- Hidetaka Yoshioka – Takayama's son
- Yoshitaka Zushi – Neighbor
- Mitsuru Hirata – Tada
- Nobuto Okamoto – Ōta
- Tetsu Watanabe
- Norio Matsui
- Noriko Honma – Old lady holding a cat

== Release ==
Madadayo was distributed theatrically in Japan by Toho on 17 April 1993. The film was exhibited at various American film festivals beginning on March 20, 1998. It did not initially receive a wide theatrical release and was released directly to television by WinStar Cinema and first broadcast on Turner Classic Movies in September 1999. It was reissued theatrically on September 1, 2000.

English-subtitled DVDs have been released by Winstar and the Criterion Collection in the U.S., Madman in Australia, Yume Pictures in the UK, and Mei Ah in Hong Kong. A Blu-ray edition, without English subtitles, is available in Japan as part of a box set with Rashomon, Ran, and The Quiet Duel.

== Reception ==
=== Critical response ===
Madadayo has an approval rating of 87% on review aggregator website Rotten Tomatoes, based on 15 reviews, and an average rating of 7.2/10. Metacritic assigned the film a weighted average score of 79 out of 100, based on 11 critics, indicating "generally favorable reviews".

=== Awards and nominations ===
In Japan, the film won the awards for Best Art Direction, Best Cinematography, Best Lighting at the Japanese Academy Awards. All these awards were given to their respective crews for their work on both Madadayo and Rainbow Bridge.

For his performance in the film, George Tokoro received the Blue Ribbon Award for Best Supporting Actor.

== See also ==
- Cinema of Japan
- List of submissions to the 66th Academy Awards for Best Foreign Language Film
- List of Japanese submissions for the Academy Award for Best International Feature Film
