= Mieko Harada =

Japanese actress (born 1958)

- Born: 26 December 1958 (age 67); Tokyo, Japan
- Occupation: Actress
- Years active: 1972–present
- Spouse: Ryo Ishibashi (m. 1987)
- Children: 3, including Shizuka Ishibashi

Mieko Harada (原田 美枝子, Harada Mieko; born December 26, 1958) is a Japanese actress. She has played various roles in many films and Japanese television drama series since 1974.

== Career ==
Harada most notably portrayed Lady Kaede in Akira Kurosawa's 1985 film Ran, and further collaborated with him in his 1990 film Dreams. Harada also provided the voice for Kaguya in the 2002 anime film InuYasha the Movie: The Castle Beyond the Looking Glass.

Harada won the award for best actress at the 21st Hochi Film Award for Village of Dreams and at the 23rd Hochi Film Award for Begging for Love.

== Personal life ==
Harada has been married to actor and singer Ryo Ishibashi since 1987 and has three children (two daughters and one son).

== Filmography ==
=== Film ===
- Lullaby of the Earth (1976)
- The Youth Killer (1976)
- Torakku Yarō: Totsugeki ichibanboshi (1978)
- The Fall of Ako Castle (1978)
- Ah! Nomugi Toge (1979)
- Aftermath of Battles Without Honor and Humanity (1979)
- Jigoku (1979)
- Ran (1985) – Lady Kaede
- Bakumatsu Seishun Graffiti: Ronin Sakamoto Ryōma (1986) – Oryō
- Tokyo: The Last Megalopolis (1988)
- Tsuribaka Nisshi 2 (1989)
- Dreams (1990)
- Shikibu Monogatari (1990)
- My Sons (1991)
- Strawberry Road (1991)
- Village of Dreams (1996)
- Begging for Love (1998)
- After the Rain (1999)
- First Love (2000)
- Off-Balance (2001)
- Inuyasha the Movie: The Castle Beyond the Looking Glass (2002) – Kaguya (voice)
- Out (2002)
- Half a Confession (2004)
- Hinokio (2005)
- The Samurai I Loved (2005)
- The Uchōten Hotel (2006)
- Dororo (2007)
- Hōtai Club (2007)
- School Days with a Pig (2008)
- Leonie (2010)
- Isoroku (2011)
- Dearest (2012)
- The Cowards Who Looked to the Sky (2012)
- Helter Skelter (2012)
- A Samurai Chronicle (2014) – Orie Toda
- Our Family (2014) – Reiko Wakaba
- If Cats Disappeared From the World (2016)
- Lear on the Shore (2017)
- Maki (2018)
- A Banana? At This Time of Night? (2018)
- A Hundred Flowers (2022) – Yuriko Kasai
- And So I'm at a Loss (2023)
- I Don't Know You(2026), Michiyo

=== Television ===
- Naruto Hichō (1977–78)
- Kita no Kuni kara (1981–2002) – Ryoko
- Taiheiki (1991) – Ano Renshi
- Nemureru Mori (1998) – Makiko Hamazaki
- Hojo Tokimune (2001) - Kikyo
- The Family (2007) – Yasuko Manpyō
- Clouds Over the Hill (2009–11) – Yae Masaoka
- Nagareboshi (2010) – Kazuko Okada
- On (2016) – Taeko Ishigami
- Mozart in the Jungle (2018) – Sadako
- Chimudondon (2022) – Fusako Ōshiro
- Umeko: The Face of Female Education (2022) – old Tsuda Umeko / narrator
- House of the Owl (2024) – Prime Minister Shiori Watanabe
- Reboot (2026) – Ryoko Hayase
- Viral Hit (2026)

== Awards and honors ==
Year	Honor	Ref.
2024	Medal with Purple Ribbon	

Year	Award	Category	Work(s)	Result	Ref.
1977	19th Blue Ribbon Awards	Best Newcomer	Lullaby of the Earth, The Youth Killer	Won	
1977	50th Kinema Junpo Awards	Best Actress	Lullaby of the Earth, The Youth Killer	Won	
1977	1st Elan d'or Awards	Newcomer of the Year	Herself	Won	
1980	3rd Japan Academy Film Prize	Best Supporting Actress	Nomugi Pass, Sono go no jingi naki tatakai	Nominated	
1986	11th Hochi Film Award	Best Supporting Actress	House on Fire	Won	
1987	10th Japan Academy Film Prize	Best Supporting Actress	House on Fire	Won	
1991	14th Japan Academy Film Prize	Best Supporting Actress	Dreams, Tsuribaka Nisshi 2, Mt. Aso's Passions	Nominated	
1996	21st Hochi Film Award	Best Actress	Village of Dreams	Won	
1997	70th Kinema Junpo Awards	Best Actress	Village of Dreams	Won	
1997	39th Blue Ribbon Awards	Best Actress	Village of Dreams	Won	
1997	6th Japanese Movie Critics Awards	Best Actress	Village of Dreams	Won	
1998	23rd Hochi Film Award	Best Actress	Begging for Love	Won	
1999	53rd Mainichi Film Awards	Best Actress	Begging for Love	Won	
1999	22nd Japan Academy Film Prize	Best Actress	Begging for Love	Won	
1999	72nd Kinema Junpo Awards	Best Actress	Begging for Love	Won	
1999	20th Yokohama Film Festival	Best Actress	Begging for Love	Won	
1999	41st Blue Ribbon Awards	Best Actress	Begging for Love	Won	
1999	8th Tokyo Sports Film Award	Best Actress	Begging for Love	Won	
2001	24th Japan Academy Film Prize	Best Supporting Actress	After the Rain	Won	
2001	24th Japan Academy Film Prize	Best Supporting Actress	First Love	Nominated	
2001	55th Mainichi Film Awards	Kinuyo Tanaka Award	Herself	Won	
2003	26th Japan Academy Prize	Best Supporting Actress	Out	Nominated	
2022	35th Nikkan Sports Film Awards	Best Actress	A Hundred Flowers	Nominated	
