= Shoji Ueda (cinematographer) =

Japanese cinematographer (1938–2025)

- Born: 1 January 1938; Funabashi, Chiba, Japan
- Died: 16 January 2025 (aged 87); Yokohama, Kanagawa, Japan
- Occupation: Cinematographer
- Years active: 1961–2025

Shoji Ueda (Japanese: 上田正治; 1 January 1938 – 16 January 2025) was a Japanese cinematographer. He worked several times with filmmaker Akira Kurosawa. He was nominated for the Academy Award for Best Cinematography for his work in the film Ran (1985).

Ueda died from a heart attack on 16 January 2025 in Yokohama, at the age of 87.

== Selected filmography ==
Year	Title	Director	Notes
1971	Damasarete moraimasu	Takashi Tsuboshima	
1974	Shiawase	Hideo Onchi	
1974	ESPY	Jun Fukuda	
1977	The Last Dinosaur	Alex Grasshoff	
1980	Kagemusha	Akira Kurosawa	With Takao Saito
1985	Ran	Akira Kurosawa	With Takao Saito and Asakazu Nakai
1990	Dreams	Akira Kurosawa	With Takao Saito
1991	Rhapsody in August	Akira Kurosawa	With Takao Saito
1993	Madadayo	Akira Kurosawa	With Takao Saito
1999	After the Rain	Takashi Koizumi	
2002	Letters from the Mountains	Takashi Koizumi	
2003	Warabi no kō	Hideo Onchi	
2007	Best Wishes for Tomorrow	Takashi Koizumi	
2007	For Those We Love	Taku Shinjō	
