= Whiteout (2000 film) =

- Film poster
- Directed by: Setsurou Wakamatsu
- Screenplay by: Yuichi Shimpo; Kenzaburo Iida; Yasuo Hasegawa
- Story by: Yuichi Shimpo
- Produced by: Shohei Kotaki; Noboyuki Toya; Takashi Ishihara; Hirotsugu Usui
- Starring: Yūji Oda; Nanako Matsushima; Koichi Sato; Katsuo Nakamura
- Cinematography: Hideo Yamamoto; Satoshi Murakawa
- Edited by: Yoshifumi Fukazawa
- Music by: Ken Ishii; Norihito Sumitomo
- Production companies: Nippon Herald Eiga; Fuji-TV; Toho; Nippon Victor; Dentsu; Destiny Production
- Distributed by: Toho
- Release date: 19 August 2000 (Japan)
- Running time: 129 minutes
- Country: Japan
- Language: Japanese
- Box office: ¥4.2 billion ($52.8 million)

Whiteout (Japanese: ホワイトアウト, Hepburn: Howaitoauto) is a 2000 Japanese film directed by Setsurou Wakamatsu, with special effects by Makoto Kamiya. A Die Hard-style movie made in Japan, it is about a one-man fight against a terrorist attack at a dam in Japan, starring Yūji Oda (織田裕二) and Nanako Matsushima (松嶋菜々子).

== Plot ==
It was an ordinary rescue mission for dam controller Togashi Teruo (Yūji Oda) and his colleague Yoshioka Kazushi as they set out to assist a few climbers who met an unexpected blizzard near the Okutowa Dam. Unfortunately, Yoshioka was injured while helping the others and Togashi had no choice but to seek help alone. Things got worse when WHITEOUT - a meteorological phenomenon – appeared and Togashi lost his best friend forever.

Meanwhile, with the most advanced technology, Utsuki Hirotaka (Koichi Sato) and his group of terrorists blow up the only main road to Okutowa Dam, the largest dam in Japan. They take over the dam along with the workers as hostages. They demanded JPY 5 billion from the government with a 24-hour deadline. To let the government know that they mean business, they decide to kill the hostages one by one unless they hear a definite answer from the highest government official. Among the hostages is Hirakawa Chiaki (Nanako Matsushima), Yoshioka’s fiancée whom Togashi promised his best friend to take good care of if anything bad should happen to Togashi.

A snowstorm isolates the Okutowa Dam, preventing access and trapping individuals inside. Terrorists demand a ransom under threat of destroying the dam, which would endanger the 200,000 downstream residents. Uncaptured by the terrorists, Togashi attempts to independently counter the group, rescue hostage Hirakawa, and prevent the destruction of the facility.

== Release ==
Whiteout was released in Japan on 19 August 2000 where it was distributed by Toho and was the number one film in Japan for the weekend.

== Awards and nominations ==
2001 Awards of the Japanese Academy

- Best Sound - Osamu Onodera
- Best Supporting Actor - Kōichi Satō
- Nomination - Best Actor - Yūji Oda
- Nomination - Best Actress - Nanako Matsushima
- Nomination - Best Art Direction - Fumio Ogawa
- Nomination - Best Cinematography - Hideo Yamamoto
- Nomination - Best Director - Setsurou Wakamatsu
- Nomination - Best Editing - Yoshifumi Fukazawa
- Nomination - Best Film
- Nomination - Best Lighting - Yoshikazu Motohashi
- Nomination - Best Music Score - Ken Ishii

2001 Blue Ribbon Awards

- Best Actor - Yūji Oda

Hochi Film Awards

- Best Actor - Yūji Oda

2001 Mainichi Film Award

- Best Film - Setsurou Wakamatsu

2001 Nikkan Sports Film Award

- Ishihara Yujiro Award
