= Setsurō Wakamatsu =

Japanese film director (born 1949)

- Born: May 5, 1949 (age 77); Akita Prefecture, Japan
- Occupation: Film director

Setsurō Wakamatsu (若松節朗, Wakamatsu Setsurō) is a Japanese film director. His film Shizumanu Taiyō won the Japan Academy Prize for Picture of the Year at the 33rd Japan Academy Prize.

== Filmography ==
=== Film ===
- Whiteout (2000)
- Shikyū no kioku (2007)
- The Unbroken (2009)
- In the City of Dawn (2011)
- Snow on the Blades (2014)
- Aircraft Carrier Ibuki (2019)
- Fukushima 50 (2020)
- Silence of the Sea (2024)

=== Television ===
- Ikkyū san (1985, TV movie)
- Ikkyū san katsu! (1986, miniseries)
- Oikaketai no (1988, 1 episode)
- Perfect Woman (2000, 6 episodes)
- Brother (2004, miniseries)
- Shukumei (2004, TV movie)
- Emergency Room 24 Hours (2005, 1 episode)
- Gion bayashi (2005, TV movie)
- Pandora (2008, 1 episode)
- Homeroom on the Beachside (2008)
- Kyouguu (2011, TV movie)
- Inseparable Souls: Fathers, Sons, and the Crash of JAL 123 (2012, miniseries)
- Yurichika e Mama kara no dengon (2013, TV movie)
- Chicken Race (2013, TV movie)
- Shingari: Yamaichi Shôken Saigo no Seisen (2015, 4 episodes)
- Kyoaku wa nemurasenai: Tokusô Kenji no gyakushû (2016, TV movie)
- Ishi tsubute - gaimusho kimitsuhi wo abaita sosa 2ka no otokotachi (2017, miniseries)
- Amerika ni Makenakatta Otoko (2020, TV movie)
- Tokkai - furyō saiken tokubetsu kaishū bu - (2021, 6 episodes)
- Water Margin aka Kitakata Kenzo Suikoden (2026)
