= Ran (film) =

1985 Japanese film by Akira Kurosawa

- Theatrical release poster
- Directed by: Akira Kurosawa
- Screenplay by: Akira Kurosawa; Hideo Oguni; Masato Ide
- Based on: King Lear by William Shakespeare
- Produced by: Katsumi Furukawa; Masato Hara; Serge Silberman
- Starring: Tatsuya Nakadai; Akira Terao; Jinpachi Nezu; Daisuke Ryu; Mieko Harada; Yoshiko Miyazaki; Mansai Nomura; Hisashi Igawa; Peter; Masayuki Yui
- Cinematography: Takao Saito; Shoji Ueda; Asakazu Nakai
- Edited by: Akira Kurosawa
- Music by: Toru Takemitsu
- Production companies: Herald Ace; Nippon Herald Films; Greenwich Film Productions
- Distributed by: Toho (Japan); Acteurs Auteurs Associés (France)
- Release dates: May 31, 1985 (Tokyo); June 1, 1985 (Japan); September 18, 1985 (France)
- Running time: 162 minutes
- Countries: Japan; France
- Language: Japanese
- Budget: $11–12 million
- Box office: $19 million (est.)

Ran (Japanese: 乱; lit. 'chaos' or 'tumult') is a 1985 epic historical action drama film directed, co-written, and edited by Akira Kurosawa. The plot derives from William Shakespeare's King Lear and includes segments based on legends of the daimyō Mōri Motonari. The film stars Tatsuya Nakadai as Hidetora Ichimonji, an aging Sengoku-period warlord who decides to abdicate as ruler in favor of his three sons.

Like most of Kurosawa's work in the 1970s and 80s, Ran is an international production, in this case a Japanese-French venture produced by Herald Ace, Nippon Herald Films, and Greenwich Film Productions. Production planning went through a long period of preparation. Kurosawa conceived the idea of Ran in the mid-1970s, when he read about Motonari, who was famous for having three highly loyal sons. Kurosawa devised a plot in which the sons become antagonists of their father. Although the film became heavily inspired by Shakespeare's play King Lear, Kurosawa began using it only after he had started preparations for Ran. Following these preparations, Kurosawa filmed Dersu Uzala in 1975, followed by Kagemusha in the early 1980s, before securing financial backing to film Ran.

Ran was Kurosawa's third encounter with Shakespeare during his career. In 1957, Kurosawa directed Throne of Blood, based on Shakespeare's Macbeth. In 1960, he directed the film The Bad Sleep Well, based on Hamlet. All three films have received critical acclaim.

As Kurosawa's last epic, Ran has often been cited as among his finest achievements and is widely regarded as one of the greatest films ever made. With a budget of $11–12 million, it was among the most expensive films in the history of Japanese cinema upon its release. Ran was previewed on May 31, 1985, at the Tokyo International Film Festival before its release on June 1, 1985, in Japan. The film was hailed for its powerful images and use of color; costume designer Emi Wada won an Academy Award for Best Costume Design for her work on Ran, and Kurosawa received his only career nomination for Best Director. The distinctive film score, inspired by Gustav Mahler, was composed by Toru Takemitsu.

== Plot ==
Hidetora Ichimonji, a powerful but elderly daimyo, decides to divide his domain among his three sons. Taro, the eldest, will receive the prestigious First Castle and become leader of the Ichimonji clan, though Hidetora will retain the title of Great Lord. Second and third sons Jiro and Saburo are to support Taro and will be given the Second and Third Castles. However, Saburo is exiled after criticizing his father's lecture about unity. Hidetora's retainer Tango is also exiled for defending Saburo.

Taro's wife Lady Kaede urges him to take full control of the clan. When Taro demands Hidetora renounce his title, a furious Hidetora leaves and travels to Jiro's castle, only to discover that Jiro is only interested in using him as a pawn. As Hidetora and his retinue wander, he decides to take over the Third Castle, which had become deserted after Saburo's exile.

Later, the Third Castle is attacked by Taro and Jiro's combined forces, and all of Hidetora's retinue are either killed or commit ritual suicide. Jiro's general Kurogane takes advantage of the confusion and shoots Taro dead with an arquebus. Hidetora succumbs to madness and is allowed to leave. Tango and court fool Kyoami, still loyal to Hidetora, accompany him as he wanders across the land, haunted by visions of the people he killed in the past. They take refuge in a peasant's home only to discover that the occupant is Tsurumaru, the brother of Lady Sue, Jiro's wife. Hidetora had blinded Tsurumaru after massacring his family and left him impoverished.

With Taro dead, Jiro becomes the Great Lord of the Ichimonji clan, and moves into the First Castle. Tango, learning that Jiro is considering sending assassins after Hidetora, rides off to alert Saburo. Lady Kaede seduces Jiro, and demands that he kill Lady Sue and marry her instead. Jiro orders Kurogane to do the deed, but he refuses, seeing through Kaede's perfidy. Kurogane then warns Sue and Tsurumaru to flee.

Saburo's army enters Jiro's territory to find Hidetora, forcing Jiro to hastily mobilize his army. A brief truce is reached and Saburo rides off after learning of Hidetora's whereabouts. Tsurumaru and Sue arrive at the ruins of the family castle. Sue leaves to retrieve the flute Tsurumaru has inadvertently left behind, giving him a picture of Amida Buddha for protection before she departs. She never returns. Jiro breaks the truce and attacks Saburo's remaining forces, suffering significant losses, and is forced to retreat when informed that the armies of the neighbouring lords are marching on the First Castle. Saburo tracks down Hidetora, who has partially recovered his sanity, and the two reconcile. However, Saburo is shot and killed by one of Jiro's assassins. Overcome with grief, Hidetora dies on his son's body.

As the First Castle is besieged, Kurogane learns of Sue's death, and confronts Kaede. After confessing that her plot was revenge against the entire Ichimonji clan for massacring her family, Kaede is beheaded by Kurogane. Jiro, Kurogane and all Jiro's men subsequently die in battle. A funeral procession is held for Saburo and Hidetora. Meanwhile, left alone in the castle ruins, Tsurumaru trips, dropping the Amida Buddha image that Sue had given to him.

== Cast ==
Actor	Character	King Lear analogue
Tatsuya Nakadai	Ichimonji Hidetora (一文字 秀虎)	King Lear
Akira Terao	Ichimonji "Taro" Takatora (一文字 太郎 孝虎)	Goneril
Jinpachi Nezu	Ichimonji "Jiro" Masatora (一文字 次郎 正虎)	Regan
Daisuke Ryu	Ichimonji "Saburo" Naotora (一文字 三郎 直虎)	Cordelia
Mieko Harada	Lady Kaede (楓の方)	Edmund
Yoshiko Miyazaki	Lady Sue (末の方)	Albany
Mansai Nomura	Tsurumaru (鶴丸)	Gloucester
Hisashi Igawa	Kurogane (鉄)	Oswald
Peter	Kyoami (狂阿弥)	Fool
Masayuki Yui	Hirayama Tango (平山 丹後)	Kent
Kazuo Kato	Ikoma Kageyu (生駒 勘解由)	
Jun Tazaki	Ayabe Seiji (綾部 政治)	Duke of Burgundy
Hitoshi Ueki	Fujimaki Nobuhiro (藤巻 信弘)	King of France

== Production ==
Prior to filming, Kurosawa spent ten years storyboarding every shot in the film as paintings. This is the Third Castle upon Hidetora's arrival.

Ran was Kurosawa's last epic film and by far his most expensive. At the time, its budget of $11–12 million made it the most expensive Japanese film in history, leading to its distribution in 1985 exceeding the budget of $7.5 million for his previous film Kagemusha. It is a Japanese-French venture produced by Herald Ace, Nippon Herald Films, and Greenwich Film Productions. Filming started in 1983. The 1,400 uniforms and suits of armor used for the extras were designed by costume designer Emi Wada and Kurosawa, and were handmade by master tailors, taking three years. The film also used 200 horses. Kurosawa loved filming in lush and expansive locations, and most of Ran was shot amidst the mountains and plains of Mount Aso, Japan's largest active volcano. Kurosawa was granted permission to shoot at two of the country's most famous landmarks, the ancient castles at Kumamoto and Himeji. For the castle of Lady Sue's family, he used the ruins of the custom-constructed Azusa castle, made by Kurosawa's production crew near Mount Fuji. Hidetora's third castle, which was burned to the ground, was a real building which Kurosawa built on the slopes of Mount Fuji. No miniatures were used for that segment, and Tatsuya Nakadai had to do the scene where Hidetora flees the castle in one take. Kurosawa also filmed a scene that required an entire field to be sprayed gold, but cut it out of the final film during editing. The documentary A.K. shows the filming of the scene.

Kurosawa often shot scenes with three cameras simultaneously, each using different lenses and angles. Many long-shots were employed and very few close-ups. On several occasions, Kurosawa used static cameras and suddenly brought the action into frame, rather than using the camera to track the action. He also used jump cuts to progress certain scenes, changing the pace of the action for filmic effect.

Akira Kurosawa's wife of 39 years, Yōko Yaguchi, died during the production of the film. He halted filming for one day to mourn before resuming work. His regular recording engineer Fumio Yanoguchi also died late in production in January 1985.

=== Crew ===
- Akira Kurosawa – director, co-writer
- Ishirō Honda – associate director
- Kunio Nozaki – assistant director
- Ichiro Yamamoto – assistant director
- Okihiro Yoneda – assistant director
- Teruyo Nogami – production manager
- Takeji Sano – lighting
- Yoshiro Muraki – production design
- Shinobu Muraki – production design
- Emi Wada – costume design
- Ichiro Minawa – sound effects

Personnel taken from The Criterion Collection.

=== Development ===
Kurosawa conceived of the idea that became Ran in the mid-1970s, when he read a parable about the Sengoku-period warlord Mōri Motonari. Motonari was famous for having three sons, all incredibly loyal and talented. Kurosawa began imagining what would have happened had they been bad. Although the film eventually became heavily inspired by Shakespeare's play King Lear, Kurosawa became aware of the play only after he had started pre-planning. According to him, the stories of Mōri Motonari and Lear merged in a way he was never fully able to explain. He wrote the script shortly after filming Dersu Uzala in 1975, and then "let it sleep" for seven years. During this time, he painted storyboards of every shot in the film (later included with the screenplay and available on the Criterion Collection DVD release) and then continued searching for funding. Following his success with 1980's Kagemusha, which he later considered a "dress rehearsal" or "dry run" for Ran, Kurosawa was finally able to secure backing from French producer Serge Silberman.

Kurosawa once said "Hidetora is me", and there is evidence in the film that Hidetora serves as a stand-in for Kurosawa. Roger Ebert agrees, arguing that Ran "may be as much about Kurosawa's life as Shakespeare's play". Ran was the final film of Kurosawa's "third period" (1965–1985), a time when he had difficulty securing support for his pictures, and was frequently forced to seek foreign financial backing. While he had directed over twenty films in the first two decades of his career, he directed just four in these two decades. After directing Red Beard (1965), Kurosawa discovered that he was considered old-fashioned and did not work again for almost five years. He also found himself competing against television, which had reduced Japanese film audiences from a high of 1.1 billion in 1958 to under 200 million by 1975. In 1968, he was fired from the 20th Century Fox epic Tora! Tora! Tora! over what he described as creative differences, but others said was a perfectionism that bordered on insanity. Kurosawa tried to start an independent production group with three other directors, but his 1970 film Dodes'ka-den was a box-office flop and bankrupted the company. Many of his younger rivals boasted that he was finished. A year later, unable to secure any domestic funding and plagued by ill health, Kurosawa attempted suicide by slashing his wrists. Though he survived, his misfortune continued to plague him until the late 1980s. According to Stephen Prince, medical treatment and Mosfilm's offer to make a film in Russia (Dersu Uzala) helped Kurosawa's eventual "spiritual recovery."

Kurosawa was influenced by the William Shakespeare play King Lear and borrowed elements from it. Both depict an aging warlord who decides to divide up his kingdom among his children. Hidetora has three sons – Taro, Jiro, and Saburo – who correspond to Lear's daughters Goneril, Regan, and Cordelia. In both, the warlord foolishly banishes anyone who disagrees with him as a matter of pride – in Lear it is the Earl of Kent and Cordelia; in Ran it is Tango and Saburo. The conflict in both is that two of the lord's children ultimately turn against him, while the third supports him, though Hidetora's sons are far more ruthless than Goneril and Regan. Both King Lear and Ran end with the death of the entire family, including the lord.

There are some crucial differences between the two stories. King Lear is a play about undeserved suffering, and Lear himself is at worst a fool. Hidetora, by contrast, has been a cruel warrior for most of his life: a man who ruthlessly murdered men, women, and children to achieve his goals. In Ran, Lady Kaede, Lady Sue, and Tsurumaru were all victims of Hidetora. Whereas in King Lear the character of Gloucester had his eyes gouged out by Lear's enemies, in Ran it was Hidetora himself who gave the order to blind Tsurumaru. The role of the Fool has been expanded into a major character (Kyoami). Kurosawa was concerned that Shakespeare gave his characters no past, and he wanted to give his version of King Lear a history.

The complex and variant etymology for the word Ran used as the title has been variously translated as "chaos", "rebellion", or "revolt"; or to mean "disturbed" or "confused".

=== Filming ===
The filming of Ran began in 1983. The development and conception of the filming of the war scenes in the film were influenced by Kurosawa's opinions on nuclear warfare. According to Michael Wilmington, Kurosawa told him that much of the film was a metaphor for nuclear warfare and the anxiety of the post-Hiroshima age. He believed that, despite all of the technological progress of the 20th century, all people had learned was how to kill each other more efficiently. In Ran, the vehicle for apocalyptic destruction is the arquebus, an early firearm that was introduced to Japan in the 16th century. Arquebuses revolutionized samurai warfare. Kurosawa had already dealt with this theme in his previous film Kagemusha, in which the Takeda cavalry is destroyed by the arquebuses of the Oda and Tokugawa clans.

In Ran, the battle of Hachiman Field is an illustration of this new kind of warfare. Saburo's arquebusiers annihilate Jiro's cavalry and drive off his infantry by engaging them from the woods, where the cavalry are unable to venture. Similarly, Taro and Saburo's assassination by a sniper also shows how individual heroes can be easily disposed of on a modern battlefield. Kurosawa also illustrates this new warfare with his camera. Instead of focusing on the warring armies, he frequently sets the focal plane beyond the action, so that in the film they appear as abstract entities.

=== Casting ===
The description of Hidetora in the first script was originally based on Toshiro Mifune. However, the role was cast to Tatsuya Nakadai, an actor who had played several supporting and major characters in previous Kurosawa films, such as Shingen and his double in Kagemusha. Other Kurosawa veterans in Ran were Masayuki Yui (Tango), Jinpachi Nezu (Jiro) and Daisuke Ryu (Saburo), all of whom were in Kagemusha. For Akira Terao (Taro) and Mieko Harada (Lady Kaede), Ran was their first Kurosawa film, but they would go on to work with him again in Dreams. Hisashi Igawa (Kurogane), who had previously been in Kurosawa's Dodes'ka-den, would reappear in both Dreams and Rhapsody in August. Kurosawa also hired two popular entertainers for supporting roles: singer-dancer Shinnosuke "Peter" Ikehata as Hidetora's loyal fool Kyoami and comedian-musician Hitoshi Ueki as rival warlord Nobuhiro Fujimaki. About 1,400 extras were employed.

=== Acting style ===
While most of the characters in Ran are portrayed by conventional acting techniques, three performances are reminiscent of Japanese Noh theatre. Noh is a form of Japanese traditional theatre requiring highly trained actors and musicians where emotions are primarily conveyed by stylized conventional gestures. The heavy, ghost-like make-up worn by Tatsuya Nakadai's character, Hidetora, resembles the emotive masks worn by traditional Noh performers. The body language exhibited by the same character is also typical of Noh theatre: long periods of static motion and silence, followed by an abrupt, sometimes violent, change in stance. The characters of Lady Kaede and Tsurumaru are also Noh-influenced. The Noh treatment emphasizes the ruthless, passionate, and single-minded natures of these two characters.

=== Music ===
Craig Lysy, writing for Movie Music UK, commented on the strengths of the film soundtrack's composer for Kurosawa's purposes: "Tōru Takemitsu was Japan's preeminent film score composer and Kurosawa secured his involvement in 1976, during the project's early stages. Their initial conception of the score was to use tategoe, a "shrill-voice" chant style without instrumentation. Over the intervening years, Kurosawa's conception of the score changed dramatically. As they began production his desire had changed 180 degrees, now insisting on a powerful Mahleresque orchestral score. Takemitsu responded with what many describe as his most romantic effort, one that achieved a perfect blending of Oriental and Occidental sensibilities."

Takemitsu has stated that he was significantly influenced by the Japanese karmic concept of ma, interpreted as a surplus of energy surrounding an abundant void. As Lysy stated: "Takemitsu was guided in his efforts best summed up in the Japanese word ma, which suggests the incongruity of a void abounding with energy. He related: 'My music is like a garden, and I am the gardener. Listening to my music can be compared with walking through a garden and experiencing the changes in light, pattern and texture.'"

The project was the second of two which allowed Kurosawa and Takemitsu to collaborate, the first being Dodes'ka-den in 1970. Lysy summarized the second project stating: "the collaboration between Kurosawa and the temperamental Takemitsu was rocky. Kurosawa constantly sent Takemitsu notes, which only served to infuriate him, so he frequently visited the set to gain a direct sensual experience. Takemitsu actually resigned... Fortunately, producer Masato Hara intervened, made peace, and Takemitsu returned to the film. Years later, Takemitsu would relate: "Overall, I still have this feeling of ... 'Oh, if only he'd left more up to me' ... But seeing it now ... I guess it's fine the way it is.'"

Kurosawa originally had wanted the London Symphony Orchestra to perform the score for Ran, but upon meeting conductor Hiroyuki Iwaki of the Sapporo Symphony Orchestra, he engaged Iwaki and the orchestra to record it. Kurosawa had the orchestra play up to 40 takes of the music. The running time of the soundtrack is just over an hour and was re-released in 2016 after its original release in 1985 by Silva Screen Productions. It was produced by Reynold da Silva and David Stoner.

== Reception ==
=== Box office ===
Released on June 1, 1985, the film was modestly successful financially in Japan. It earned ¥2.51 billion ($12 million) in Japan, just enough to break even. In France, where it released on 18 September 1985, the film sold 813,081 tickets, grossing an estimated 24,392,430 F ($2,439,243).

In the United States, where it released in December 1985, the film grossed $3,763,760 in its first four weeks of release. Later re-releases between 2000 and 2016 grossed $528,357 in the United States and Canada, bringing its total North American gross to $4,292,117.

In Germany, where it released in 1986, the film sold 222,862 tickets, grossing an estimated €735,440 ($714,912). The film also grossed $18,692 in the United Kingdom, and $16,215 in Portugal, bringing the film's total estimated gross to approximately $19,481,179 (equivalent to $58,000,000 in 2025) worldwide.

=== Critical reviews ===
Ran was critically acclaimed upon its premiere. On review aggregator website Rotten Tomatoes, the film holds an approval rating of 96%, based on 94 reviews, and an average rating of 9.3/10. The website's critical consensus reads, "Akira Kurosawa's sprawling, epic take on King Lear should be required viewing for fans of westerns, war movies, or period films in general." On Metacritic, the film has a weighted average score of 97 out of 100, based on 21 critics, indicating "universal acclaim".

Shawn Levy, of the Portland Oregonian wrote, "In many respects, it's Kurosawa's most sumptuous film, a feast of color, motion and sound: Considering that its brethren include Kagemusha, Seven Samurai and Dersu Uzala, the achievement is extraordinary." Writing for the Chicago Sun-Times, Roger Ebert said, "Ran is a great, glorious achievement." In the San Francisco Examiner, G. Allen Johnson stated: "Kurosawa pulled out all the stops with Ran, his obsession with loyalty and his love of expressionistic film techniques allowed to roam freely."

Writing for the San Francisco Chronicle, Bob Graham stated: "In Ran, the horrors of life are transformed by art into beauty. It is finally so moving that the only appropriate response is silence." Gene Siskel, writing for the Chicago Tribune, wrote: "The physical scale of Ran is overwhelming. It's almost as if Kurosawa is saying to all the cassette buyers of America, in a play on Clint Eastwood's phrase, 'Go ahead, ruin your night' – wait to see my film on a small screen and cheat yourself out of what a movie can be." Vincent Canby, writing for The New York Times, stated: "Though big in physical scope and of a beauty that suggests a kind of drunken, barbaric lyricism, Ran has the terrible logic and clarity of a morality tale seen in tight close-up, of a myth that, while being utterly specific and particular in its time and place, remains ageless, infinitely adaptable."

Roger Ebert awarded the film four out of four stars, with extended commentary, "Kurosawa (while directing Ran) often must have associated himself with the old lord as he tried to put this film together, but in the end he has triumphed, and the image I have of him, at 75, is of three arrows bundled together." In 2000, it was inducted into Ebert's Great Movies list.

Notoriously acerbic critic John Simon of the National Review wrote, "I find it as an almost total failure by a genius in his old age".

Michal Sragow, writing for Salon in 2000, summarized the Shakespearean origins of the play: "Kurosawa's Lear is a 16th century warlord who has three sons and a career studded with conquests. Kurosawa's genius is to tell his story so that every step suggests how wild and savage a journey it has been. At the start, this bold, dominating figure, now called Hidetora, is a sacred monster who wants to be a sort of warlord emeritus. He hopes to bequeath power to his oldest son while retaining his own entourage and emblems of command. He hasn't reckoned with the ambition of his successor or the manipulative skill of his heir's wife, who goes for the sexual and political jugular of anyone who invades her sphere." In 2009, the film was voted at No. 59 on the list of The Greatest Japanese Films of All Time by Japanese film magazine Kinema Junpo.

=== Accolades ===
Ran was completed too late to be entered at Cannes and had its premiere at Japan's first Tokyo International Film Festival. Kurosawa skipped the film's premiere, angering many in the Japanese film industry. As a result, it was not submitted as Japan's entry for the Best Foreign Language Film category of the Oscars. Serge Silberman tried to get it nominated as a French co-production but failed. However, American director Sidney Lumet helped organize a campaign to have Kurosawa nominated as Best Director.

Ran was nominated for the Academy Awards for art direction, cinematography, costume design (which it won), and Kurosawa's direction. It was also nominated for a Golden Globe for Best Foreign Language Film. In Japan, Ran was conspicuously not nominated for "Best Picture" at the Awards of the Japanese Academy. However, it won two prizes, for best art direction and best music score, and received four other nominations, for best cinematography, best lighting, best sound, and best supporting actor (Hitoshi Ueki, who played Saburo's patron, Lord Fujimaki). Ran won two awards from the British Academy of Film and Television Arts, for best foreign language film and best make-up artist, and was nominated for best cinematography, best costume design, best production design, and best screenplay–adapted. Despite its limited commercial success at the time of its release, the film's accolades have improved greatly, and it is now regarded as one of Kurosawa's masterpieces.

Ran won Best Director and Best Foreign Film awards from the National Board of Review, a Best Film award and a Best Cinematography award (Takao Saitō, Shōji Ueda, and Asakazu Nakai) from the National Society of Film Critics, a Best Foreign Language Film award from the New York Film Critics Circle, a Best Music award (Toru Takemitsu) and a Best Foreign Film award from the Los Angeles Film Critics Association, a Best Film award and a Best Cinematography award from the Boston Society of Film Critics, a Best Foreign Feature award from the Amanda Awards from Norway, a Blue Ribbon Award for Best Film, a Best European Film award from the Bodil Awards, a Best Foreign Director award from the David di Donatello Awards, a Joseph Plateau Award for Best Artistic Contribution, a Director of the Year award and a Foreign Language Film of the Year award from the London Critics Circle Film Awards, a Best Film, a Best Supporting Actor (Hisashi Igawa) and a Best Director from the Mainichi Film Concours, and an OCIC award from the San Sebastian Film Festival.

In the British Film Institute's 2002 Sight & Sound polls of the greatest films ever made, Ran ranked 41st in director's poll. In 2007, the film was ranked at No. 28 by The Guardian's readers' poll on its list of "40 greatest foreign films of all time". The film was selected in BBC's list of 100 greatest foreign language films by 209 critics of 43 countries around the world in 2018.

== See also ==
- List of historical drama films of Asia
