= Dodes'ka-den =

- Theatrical release poster
- Directed by: Akira Kurosawa
- Screenplay by: Akira Kurosawa; Hideo Oguni; Shinobu Hashimoto
- Based on: A City Without Seasons; 1962 novel by Shūgorō Yamamoto
- Produced by: Akira Kurosawa; Yoichi Matsue; Keisuke Kinoshita; Kon Ichikawa; Masaki Kobayashi
- Starring: Yoshitaka Zushi; Kin Sugai; Toshiyuki Tonomura; Shinsuke Minami
- Cinematography: Takao Saito; Yasumichi Fukuzawa
- Edited by: Reiko Kaneko
- Music by: Tōru Takemitsu
- Production companies: Toho; Yonki no Kai Productions
- Distributed by: Toho
- Release date: October 31, 1970 (Japan)
- Running time: 140 minutes
- Country: Japan
- Language: Japanese
- Budget: ¥100 million

Dodes'ka-den (Japanese: どですかでん, Hepburn: Dodesukaden; onomatopoeia term equivalent to "Clickety-clack") is a 1970 Japanese drama film directed by Akira Kurosawa. The film stars Yoshitaka Zushi, Kin Sugai, Toshiyuki Tonomura, and Shinsuke Minami. It is based on Shūgorō Yamamoto's 1962 novel A City Without Seasons and is about a group of homeless and poverty-stricken people living on the outskirts of Tokyo.

Dodes'ka-den was Kurosawa's first film in five years, his first without actor Toshiro Mifune since Ikiru in 1952, and his first without composer Masaru Sato since Seven Samurai in 1954. Filming began on April 23, 1970, and ended 28 days later. This was Kurosawa's first-ever color film and had a budget of only ¥100 million. In order to finance the film, Kurosawa mortgaged his house, but it failed at the box office, grossing less than its budget, leaving him with large debts and, at sixty-one years old, dim employment prospects. Kurosawa's disappointment culminated one year later on December 22, 1971, when he attempted suicide.

== Plot ==
The film is an anthology of overlapping vignettes exploring the lives of a variety of characters who live in a suburban shantytown atop a rubbish dump. The first to be introduced is Roku-chan, a boy who lives in a fantasy world in which he is a trolley driver. In his fantasy world, he drives his trolley along a set route and schedule through the dump, reciting the refrain "dodeska-den" ("clickety-clack", mimicking the sound of a trolley). His dedication to the fantasy is fanatical. Roku-chan is called "trolley freak" (densha baka) by locals and by children from outside the shantytown. His mother is concerned that Roku-chan is genuinely mentally challenged. (Note: In Yamamoto's novel it is stated "it has been repeatedly demonstrated by [expert] doctors that he is neither imbecile nor mentally deficient".) (Roku-chan has earned the label in several cinematographic writings. (Note: Such as Kurosawa's frequent script supervisor Teruyo Nogami, Kurosawa's assistant Hiromichi Horikawa, and film theorist Noël Burch.))

Ryotaro, a hairbrush maker by trade, is saddled with supporting many children whom his unfaithful wife Misao (Note: Misao means "Chastity".) has conceived in different adulterous affairs, but he is wholeheartedly devoted to them. A pair of drunken day laborers (Masuda and Kawaguchi) engage in wife-swapping, only to return to their own wives the next day as though nothing has happened. A stoic, bleak man named Hei is frequently visited by Ocho, who appears to be his ex-wife, and he watches emotionless as she does his domestic chores. It is eventually revealed that she cheated on him and returned, wracked with guilt; he does not forgive her. At the opposite end of the spectrum is Shima, a man with a tic who is always defending his outwardly unpleasant and bullying wife. He flies into a rage when friends criticize her and says that she's always been there for him. A beggar and his son live in a derelict car, a Citroën 2CV. While the father is preoccupied with daydreams of owning a magnificent home, the boy dies tragically of food poisoning and his father's neglect. He buries his son's cremated remains with Tanba's help, still keeping up the fantasy that the grave is a swimming pool built for his son to enjoy. Katsuko, a mute girl, is raped by her alcoholic uncle and becomes pregnant, and in a fit of irrationality stabs Okabe, a boy who works at the liquor shop who has tender feelings for her, not having any other way to vent her emotional turmoil. When her uncle is confronted as a suspect for this abusive act, he flees town. Okabe recovers and forgives Katsuko when she apologizes to him, his warmth toward her undaunted. Tanba the chasework silversmith is a sage figure who shows kindness to the people of the town, disarming a youth swinging a katana sword with understanding words and helping a burglar who broke into his house, first by giving him money and later denying to police that a robbery occurred.

After exploring the setbacks and anguish that surround many of the indigent characters, along with the dreams of escape that many of them support to maintain at least a superficial level of calm, the film comes full circle, returning to Roku-chan as he returns home, takes his imaginary tram conductor hat off, and hangs it up.

== Cast ==
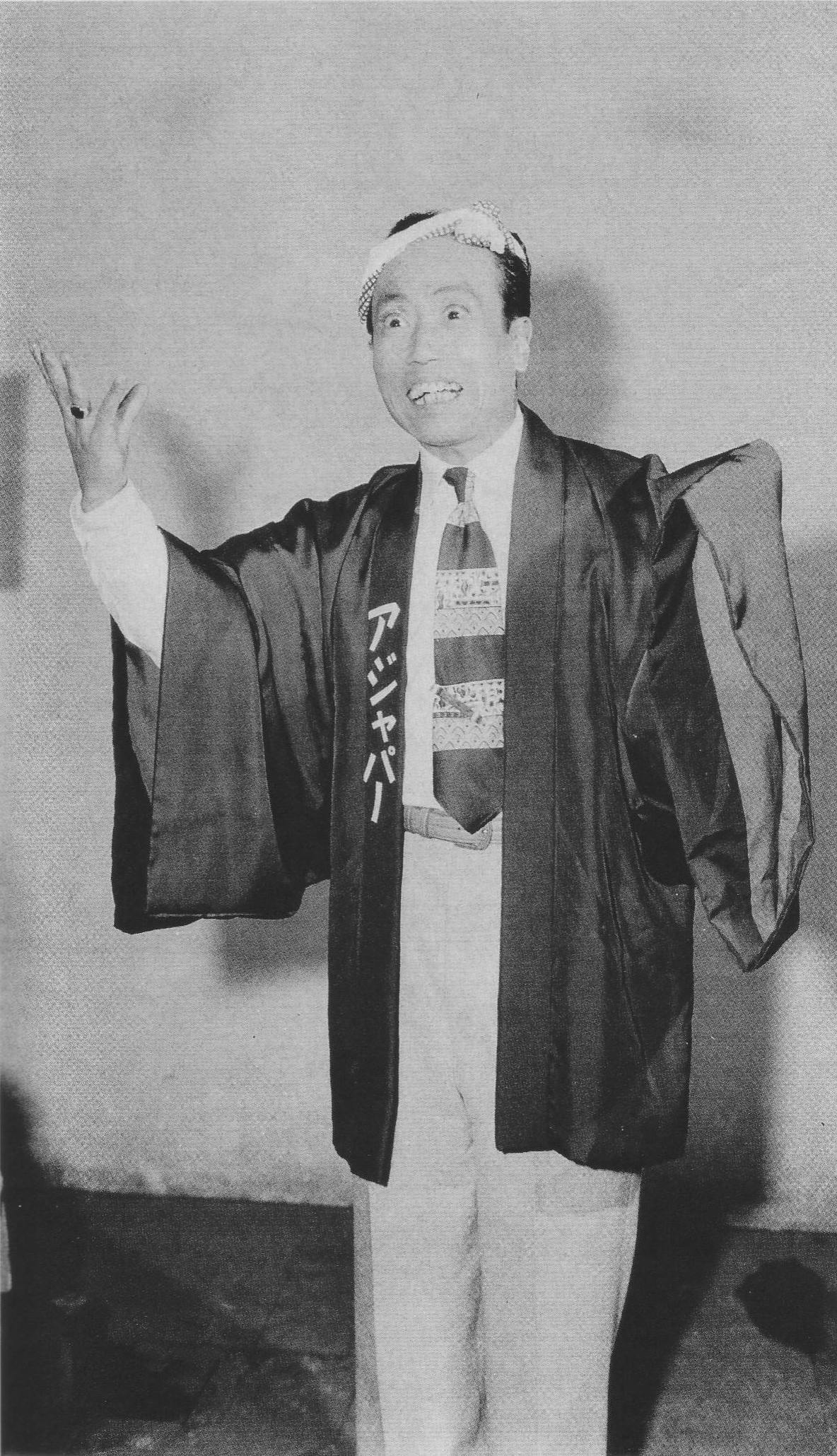
Comedian Junzaburō Ban (pictured in 1953) portrayed Yukichi Shima

- Yoshitaka Zushi as Rokuchan
- Kin Sugai as Okuni, Rokuchan's mother
- Toshiyuki Tonomura as Taro
- Shinsuke Minami as Ryotaro Sawagami
- Yuko Kusunoki as Misao, Sawagami's wife
- Junzaburō Ban as Yukichi Shima
- Kiyoko Tange as Shima's wife
- Michio Hino as Ikawa, Shima's guest
- Keiji Furuyama as Matsui, Shima's guest
- Tappei Shimokawa as Nomoto, Shima's guest
- Kunie Tanaka as Hatsutaro Kawaguchi
- Jitsuko Yoshimura as Yoshie, Kawaguchi's wife
- Hisashi Igawa as Masuo Masuda
- Hideko Okiyama as Tatsu, Masuda's wife
- Hiroshi Akutagawa as Hei
- Tomoko Naraoka as Ocho
- Atsushi Watanabe as Tanba
- Kamatari Fujiwara as Suicidal Old Man
- Kōji Mitsui as Stall Operator (cameo)

== Production ==
Five years had elapsed since the release of Akira Kurosawa's last film, Red Beard (1965). The Japanese film industry was collapsing as the major studios were slashing their production schedules or shutting down entirely due to television stealing the movie audience. When Kurosawa was let go from the American film Tora! Tora! Tora! by Twentieth Century Fox in 1969, it was rumored that the Japanese director's mental health was deteriorating. Teruyo Nogami, Kurosawa's frequent script supervisor, believes the director needed to make a good film to put that rumor to rest. Dodes'ka-den was made possible by Kurosawa forming the Club of the Four Knights production company (Yonki-no-kai) with three other Japanese directors; Keisuke Kinoshita, Masaki Kobayashi, and Kon Ichikawa. It was their first and only production.

It marks a stylistic departure from Kurosawa's previous works. It has no central story and no protagonist. Instead it weaves together the stories of a group of characters living in a slum as a series of anecdotes. It was his first color film, and he had only ever worked with a few of the actors previously; Kamatari Fujiwara, Atsushi Watanabe, Kunie Tanaka, and Yoshitaka Zushi. It marks the first time Kurosawa had used Takao Saito as principal cinematographer, and Saito became his "cinematographer of choice" for the rest of his career. Nogami said that Kurosawa told the crew that this time he wanted to make a film that is "sunny, light, and endearing." She speculated that Dodes'ka-den was his rebuttal to what went wrong on Tora! Tora! Tora!. The script supervisor of the film opined that the director was still recuperating from the shock of what happened on that Hollywood film, and was not operating at full strength. Nogami said that she gets choked up whenever she watches the scene where Rokuchan is called "trolley crazy" by children, because she imagines Kurosawa as the boy, with people yelling "Movie-crazy" at him. Kurosawa said that he wanted to show younger filmmakers that it did not need to cost a lot of money to make a movie. David A. Conrad wrote that an influence of the surging Japanese New Wave can be felt in this impulse and in the decision to focus on outcasts in contemporary society.

=== Filming ===
In contrast to Red Beard, which was in production for two years, filming for Dodes'ka-den began on April 23, 1970, and was finished in only 27 days, two months ahead of schedule. According to Stephen Prince, it was shot for standard-ratio 35 mm movie film rather than the anamorphic widescreen that Kurosawa had used since The Hidden Fortress (1958). Prince writes that this was because the director did not like how anamorphic lenses handled color information. As a result, it marks a return to the 1.37:1 aspect ratio he used regularly in the 1940s and early 1950s. Prince also states that Dodes'ka-den marks the first time the director used zoom lenses; a sign of the "speed and economy" with which he made the film. Nogami stated that she had never seen Kurosawa as "quiet and undemanding" on set as he was for Dodes'ka-den. As an example, she explained how during a nine-minute scene that had to be shot in one take, Junzaburō Ban had trouble memorizing all of his dialogue and caused numerous retakes. Nogami said "the old Kurosawa" would have lost his temper and started yelling, but instead he just gently said "let's try it again." and eventually praised Ban when the shot was finally completed. Nogami also related how Fujiwara was well known for not being able to memorize his lines. While filming an eight-minute scene with Watanabe, Kurosawa finally had had enough and had Nogami give Fujiwara verbal prompts. Nogami said her voice was hard to remove from the final tape. The drawings that cover the walls of Rokuchan's house were initially drawn by Kurosawa at home. But he decided they were too "grown-up", and had schoolchildren draw them instead.

=== Title ===
The film's title "Dodeska-den" are the playacting "words" uttered by the boy character to mimic the sound of his imaginary trolley car in motion. It is not a commonly used onomatopoeic word in the Japanese vocabulary, but was invented by author Shūgorō Yamamoto in Kisetsu no Nai Machi (A City Without Seasons), the original novel on which the film was based. In standard Japanese language, this sound would be described as gatan goton, equivalent to "clickity-clack" in English. (Note: More specifically, it is the sound that the trolley makes as it passes over the joints in the rail.)

== Reception ==
Dodes'ka-den was Kurosawa's first film in color. Domestically, it was both a commercial and critical failure upon its initial release. Abroad, however, the film was nominated for an Academy Award for Best Foreign Language Film at the 44th Academy Awards. Its Japanese reception, among other things, sent Kurosawa into a deep depression, and in 1971 he attempted suicide.

Despite continuing to draw mixed responses, Dodes'ka-den received votes from two artists – Sion Sono and the Dardenne brothers – in the British Film Institute's 2012 Sight & Sound polls of the world's greatest films.

== Awards ==
The film won the Grand Prix of the Belgian Film Critics Association.

== Documentary and home media ==
A significant short 36-minute documentary was made by Toho Masterworks concerning this film, Akira Kurosawa: It Is Wonderful to Create (Toho Masterworks, 2002). The film was released by the Criterion Collection on DVD in 2009, and it includes the documentary by Toho Masterworks.

== See also ==
- List of submissions to the 44th Academy Awards for Best Foreign Language Film
- List of Japanese submissions for the Academy Award for Best International Feature Film
