= Akira Nobuchi =

Japanese stage director and film director

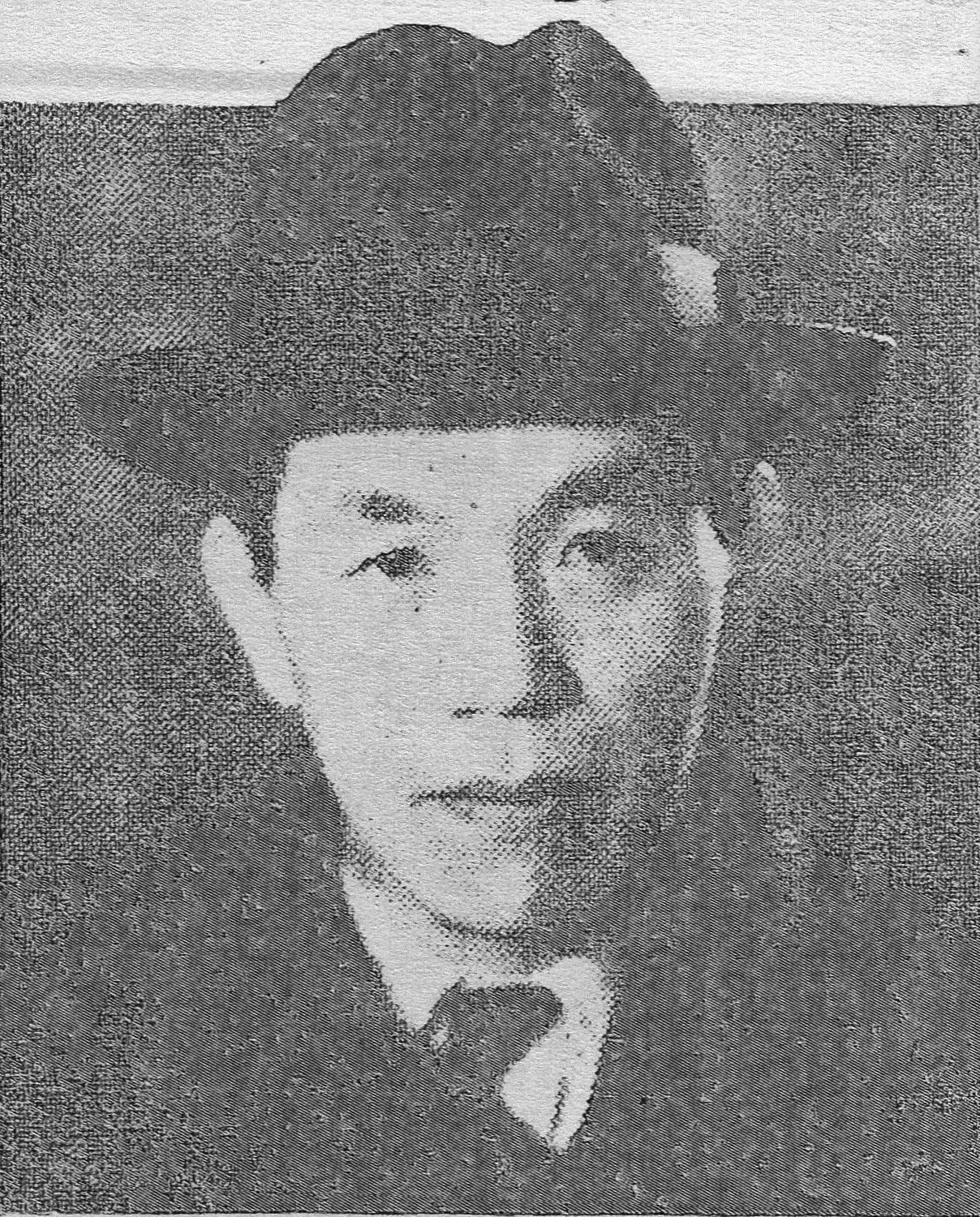
- Born: 22 June 1896; Nara City, Japan
- Died: 1 February 1968 (aged 71)
- Occupations: Stage director, film director
- Years active: 1918–1955

Akira Nobuchi (野淵 昶, Nobuchi Akira, 22 June 1896 - 1 February 1968) was a Japanese stage director and film director.

He launched the Elan Vital Shōgekijō little theatre in 1918 while he was at Kyoto Imperial University. He stage-managed plays by Anton Chekhov, Arthur Schnitzler, Lord Dunsany, Lady Gregory, John Millington Synge and Sean O'Casey as well as those by Japanese playwrights including Saneatsu Mushanokōji, Ujaku Akita, Masao Kume and Jun'ichirō Tanizaki.

Having left the Elan Vital Shōgekijō in 1933, he entered Shinkō Kinema the following year. He made a debut with talkie Nagasaki Ryūgakusei (1935), after which he made more than 30 films until 1955.

== Selected filmography ==
- Nagasaki Ryūgakusei (1935)
- Yoshida Goten (1937)
- Shizuka Gozen (1938)
- Fūfu Nise (1940)
- Taki no Shiraito (1952)
- Kaidan Botan-dōrō (1955)

== Bibliography ==
- Short stories of to-day (1929)
- One-act plays of to-day (1929)
- Enshutsu Nyūmon (1949)
