= After the Rain (film) =

1999 Japanese-French film

- Japanese film poster
- Directed by: Takashi Koizumi
- Screenplay by: Akira Kurosawa
- Story by: Shugoro Yamamoto
- Produced by: Masato Hara
- Starring: Akira Terao; Yoshiko Miyazaki; Shiro Mifune; Mieko Harada; Tatsuya Nakadai
- Cinematography: Shoji Ueda
- Edited by: Hideto Aga
- Music by: Masaru Sato
- Production companies: Asmik Ace Entertainment; Kurosawa Production; 7 Films Cinema
- Distributed by: Toho
- Release dates: September 5, 1999 (Venice Film Festival); January 22, 2000 (Japan); May 3, 2000 (France)
- Running time: 91 minutes
- Countries: Japan; France

After the Rain (Japanese: 雨あがる, Hepburn: Ame agaru) is a 1999 Japanese and French drama film. The story is based on the last script written by Akira Kurosawa and is directed by his former assistant director of 28 years, Takashi Koizumi. It was chosen as Best Film at the Japan Academy Prize ceremony. After the Rain was Japan's official submission for Best Foreign Language Film at the 73rd Academy Awards, but was not accepted as a nominee.

== Synopsis ==
A group of travelers are stranded in a small country inn when the local river floods. As the bad weather continues, tensions rise amongst the travelers trapped at the inn. A traveling rōnin (masterless samurai), Ihei Misawa, takes it upon himself to cheer everyone up by arranging a splendid feast. Unfortunately he has no money and in order to pay for the feast he visits the local dojos and challenges the masters there for payment, termed in the film as prize fighting. Later, after Misawa breaks up a duel between two young retainers of the local clan, the daimyō Shigeaki is impressed by Misawa's skill and temperament, Lord Shigeaki offers Misawa employment as a sword master. Misawa has a tense interaction with the lord and his retainers, revealing his prowess at their expense.

The film also shows the tender relationship he has with his wife, Tayo, and provides insights into the way of life of a rōnin's wife.

== Cast ==
- Akira Terao: Ihei Misawa
- Yoshiko Miyazaki: Tayo Misawa
- Shiro Mifune: Lord Nagai Izuminokami Shigeaki
- Fumi Dan: Okugata
- Hisashi Igawa: Kihei Ishiyama
- Hidetaka Yoshioka: Chamberlain Gonnojo Sakakibara
- Takayuki Katô: Hayato Naito
- Mieko Harada: Okin
- Tappie Shimokawa
- Tatsuo Matsumura: Sekkyo-Bushi Jii, the Old Preacher
- Tatsuya Nakadai: Tsuji Gettan

== Release ==
After the Rain premiered at the Venice Film Festival on October 25, 1999. It was released in Japan on January 22, 2000 where it was distributed by Toho and placed fourth at the box office for the week. It was released in France on May 3, 2000 where it was distributed by Opening Distribution.

== Awards ==
- 1999 - NOMINATED AFI Fest: Grand Jury Prize Award (Takashi Koizumi)
- 1999 - WON São Paulo International Film Festival: Mostra Special Award (Takashi Koizumi)
- 1999 - WON Venice Film Festival: CinemAwenire Award (Takashi Koizumi)
- 2000 - WON Nikkan Sports Film Awards for Best Actor (Akira Terao)
- 2001 - WON Awards of the Japanese Academy for Best Actor (Akira Terao), Best Art Direction, Best Cinematography, Best Film, Best Lighting, Best Music Score, Best Screenplay, Best Supporting Actress (Mieko Harada)
- 2001 - NOMINATED Awards of the Japanese Academy for Best Actress (Yoshiko Miyazaki), Best Director, Best Editing, Best Sound, Best Supporting Actor (Shiro Mifune)
- 2001 - WON Blue Ribbon Awards for Best Supporting Actress (Yoshiko Miyazaki)
- 2001 - WON Mainichi Film Awards for Best Cinematography
- 2001 - WON Portland International Film Festival: Audience Award (Takashi Koizumi)

== See also ==
- Cinema of Japan
- List of submissions to the 73rd Academy Awards for Best Foreign Language Film
- List of Japanese submissions for the Academy Award for Best Foreign Language Film

== Notes ==
=== Bibliography ===
- Galbraith IV, Stuart (2008). The Toho Studios Story: A History and Complete Filmography. Scarecrow Press. ISBN 978-1461673743.
