= Letters from the Mountains =

2002 film directed by Takashi Koizumi

- Film poster
- Directed by: Takashi Koizumi
- Screenplay by: Takashi Koizumi
- Based on: Amidadō Dayori by Keishi Nagi
- Produced by: Miyako Araki; Yasushi Tsuge; Tsutomu Sakurai
- Starring: Akira Terao; Kanako Higuchi; Takahiro Tamura; Tanie Kitabayashi
- Cinematography: Shoji Ueda
- Edited by: Hideto Aga
- Music by: Takashi Kako
- Production company: Asmik Ace
- Release date: October 5, 2002 (Japan)
- Running time: 128 minutes
- Country: Japan
- Language: Japanese

Letters from the Mountains (Japanese: 阿弥陀堂だより, Hepburn: Amidadō Dayori) is a 2002 Japanese drama film directed by Takashi Koizumi. The film was adapted from the novel Amidadō Dayori written by Keishi Nagi. It stars Akira Terao. Letters from the Mountains was nominated for 13 awards at the 26th Japan Academy Awards.

The film depicts a couple moving from a big city to the countryside.

== Cast ==
- Akira Terao as Takao Ueda
- Kanako Higuchi as Michiko Ueda
- Takahiro Tamura as Shignaga Kōda
- Kyōko Kagawa as Yone Kōda
- Hisashi Igawa as Sukeyaku Ishino
- Hidetaka Yoshioka as Doctor Nakamura
- Manami Konishi as Sayuri Ishino
- Tanie Kitabayashi as Oume

== Honors ==
=== Japan Academy Film Prize ===
- Won: Best Actress in a Supporting Role - Tanie Kitabayashi.
- Won: Newcomer of the Year - Manami Konishi.

=== Blue Ribbon Awards ===
- Won: Best Newcomer - Manami Konishi.

=== Mainichi Film Awards ===
- Won: Best Music - Takashi Kako.
