= Akira Terao =

- 寺尾 聰
- Born: Akira Terao; May 18, 1947 (age 79); Yokohama, Kanagawa, Japan
- Occupations: Actor; musician
- Years active: 1964–present
- Spouses: Bunjaku Han (m. 1973; div. 1974); Mayumi Hoshino
- Father: Jūkichi Uno
- Musical career
- Instrument: Vocals

Akira Terao (寺尾 聰, Terao Akira; born May 18, 1947) is a Japanese musician, singer and actor. As of 2012, he is the only male actor to have received both the Japan Record Award and the Japan Academy Award for Outstanding Performance by an Actor in a Leading Role.

== Early life ==
Terao was born in Yokohama (Kanagawa prefecture) in Japan, son of the actor and film director Jūkichi Uno. He attended schools Wako Gakuen, Hosei University Daini Senior High School, and graduated from the vocational school Bunka Gakuin.

== Career ==
=== Singing career ===
In 1966, he debuted as a bassist of a group sounds band called The Savage (ザ・サベージ). His solo debut album came out in 1970.

As a singer, Terao is known mostly for the 1981 hit song Ruby no Yubiwa (ルビーの指環) and the album it was part of named Reflections (リフレクションズ), which sold 1.6 million copies in Japan.

=== Acting career ===
As an actor, he debuted in The Sands of Kurobe, a film directed by Kei Kumai in 1968. In 1985, Terao worked under director Akira Kurosawa in Ran. Five years later he appeared as "I" in Kurosawa's Dreams. He has worked with director Takashi Koizumi in After the Rain and The Professor's Beloved Equation. As for dramas, Terao has acted with Kazunari Ninomiya in Yasashii Jikan as well as in the latest Takuya Kimura-helmed drama, Change (spring 2008). He won the award for best actor at the 47th Blue Ribbon Awards for Half a Confession. The promotional agencies to which he has belonged are Horipro, Ishihara International Productions, Inc. and his current personal agency Terao Music Offices (寺尾音楽事務所).

== Personal life ==
He was married to Bunjaku Han from 1973 to 1974 (ending in divorce). His current wife is Mayumi Hoshino. Terao is known for wearing sunglasses and for his expressions of nihilism. Because he has two moles on one cheek, he has the nickname of "hoppe" (ボッペ), meaning "cheek".

== Filmography ==
=== Films ===
- The Sands of Kurobe (1968)
- Tora-san's Sunrise and Sunset (1976)
- Ran (1985), Ichimonji Taro Takatora
- Rock yo shizukani nagareyo (1988)
- Dreams (1990), "I"
- Madadayo (1993) - Sawamura
- After the Rain (1999), Ihei Misawa
- Darkness in the Light (2001)
- Letters from the Mountains (2002) - Takao Ueda
- Casshern (2004), Professor Kotaro Azuma
- Half a Confession (2004), Soichiro Kaji
- Into the Sun (2005), Matsuda
- The Professor's Beloved Equation (2006) - the professor
- The Hovering Blade (2009), Shigeki Nagamine
- Fragments of the Last Will (2022), old Ken'ichi Yamamoto
- Mom, Is That You?! (2023)
- The Imaginary (2023), old dog (voice)
- Kaneko's Commissary (2025), Hoshida
- Unforgettable (2025), Tetta Mamiya
- Let's Meet at Angie's Bar (2025), Kumasaka

=== Television ===
- Kunitori Monogatari (1973), Tokugawa Ieyasu
- Daitokai Series (1976–1979), He was in only the 1st and 3rd seasons of the show.
- Seibu Keisatsu (1979), Takeshi Matsuda, but prefers to be called 'Rikki' by his colleagues. His character is killed in the line of duty in the 123rd episode of Part I of the show.
- Taiyō ni Hoero! Part2 (1986)
- Gunshi Kanbei (2014), Tokugawa Ieyasu
- Nobunaga Moyu (2016), Konoe Sakihisa
- Kohaku (2017), Toshio Arai
- Rikuoh (2017), Haruyuki Iiyama
- The Great White Tower (2019), Professor Azuma
- Hakone Ekiden: Our Story (2026), Hisashige Moroya

== Discography ==
- Ring of Ruby (1981)
- Reflections (1981)
- Atmosphere (1983)
- Standard (1987)

== Honours ==
- Medal with Purple Ribbon (2008)
- Order of the Rising Sun, 4th Class, Gold Rays with Rosette (2018)
