= Takao Saito (cinematographer) =

Japanese cinematographer (1929–2014)

Takao Saito (Japanese: 斎藤 孝雄, Hepburn: Saitō Takao; March 5, 1929 – December 6, 2014) was a Japanese cinematographer who frequently collaborated with filmmaker Akira Kurosawa. After assisting on High and Low (1963) and Red Beard (1965), he became Kurosawa's "cinematographer of choice" after serving as principal cinematographer on Dodes'ka-den (1970). Saito was nominated for the Academy Award for Best Cinematography for his work on the film, Ran (1985).
