= Submarine films =

Subgenre of war film

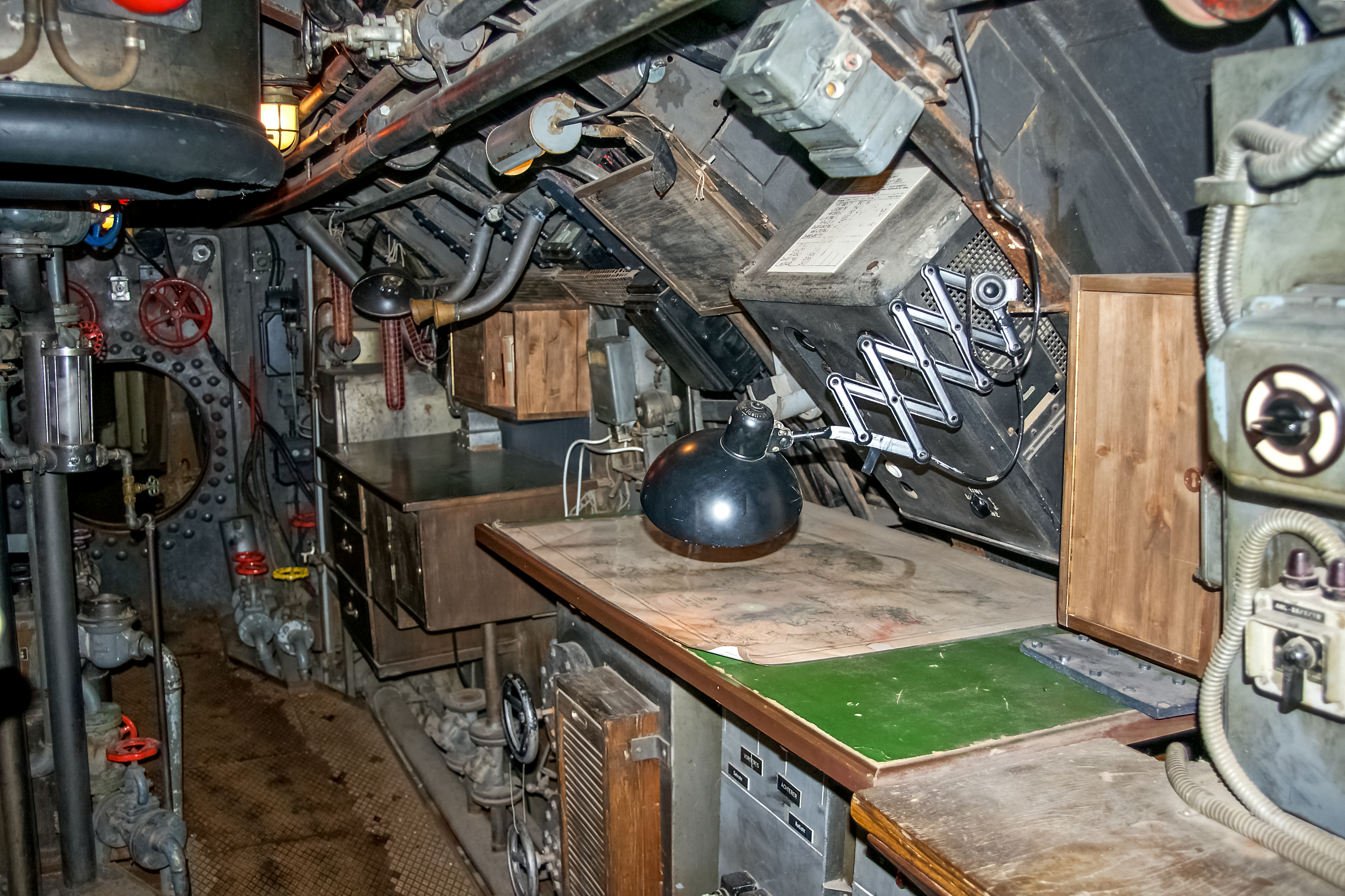
The cramped, equipment-filled set of a submarine film (Das Boot, 1981)

The submarine film is a subgenre of war film in which most of the plot revolves around a submarine below the ocean's surface. Films of this subgenre typically focus on a small but determined crew of submariners battling against enemy submarines or submarine-hunter ships, or against other problems ranging from disputes amongst the crew, threats of mutiny, life-threatening mechanical breakdowns, or the daily difficulties of living on a submarine.

The genre plays on the psychological tension of the submarine's crew and their unseen enemy, signified by a soundscape that may feature explosions, the ping of sonar, the creaking of the submarine's hull under extreme pressure, the alarm ordering the submarine to dive, and the threatening sound signatures of a destroyer's propeller or of an approaching torpedo.

Some 150 films have been made in the submarine genre between 1910 and 2010, variously depicting submarines in relatively realistic stories about World War I, World War II or the Cold War, or purely fictional and fantastic scenarios.

== Characteristics ==
Submarine films have their own particular semantics and syntax, creating a film genre concerned specifically with submarine warfare. A distinctive element in this genre is the soundtrack, which attempts to bring home the emotional and dramatic nature of conflict under the sea. For example, in the 1981 Das Boot, the sound design works together with the hours-long film format to depict lengthy pursuit with depth charges, and as the critic Linda Maria Koldau writes,

again and again, the mortal threat of the [sonar] ping, which signifies [the crew's] helpless exposure to the enemy.

Koldau identifies the basic syntactic structure of the submarine genre as "outside is bad, inside is good." The unseen outside means the enemy: this may be from nature, with elements such as water pressure threatening to crush the hull, sea monsters, or underwater rocks; or human opponents. Meanwhile, the inside of the submarine represents the human warmth and trust of the crew for each other and for their captain, their lives bound together by the situation. To this scenario can be added elements from within such as mutiny, fire, discord, or accidents including radiation leakage; and from outside such as water, terrorism, disease, and weapons, while the plot may feature sudden switches from being the hunter to being the hunted.

The soundscape may depict the creaking of the hull under pressure: as Koldau observes, this is both realistic and metaphoric, standing in for the fear and the responsibility on the shoulders of the crew. Stress may further be expressed in the acoustic signature of specifically submarine threats, such as the swelling sound of an approaching destroyer's propeller, the soft buzz of an enemy torpedo, or the submarine's own alarm ordering an immediate dive.

Another element of the soundscape less often remarked upon is simply silence, which can mean both safety (nothing is happening) and unseen danger, creating tension.

== List of submarine movies ==
This is a list of movies, grouped by the era in which they were made, in which a submarine plays a significant role in the storyline. From 1910 to 2010, some 150 fictional films about submarines have been made. Many of these are set in World War I, World War II, or the Cold War; others depict relatively "authentic" terrorist scenarios.

Some movies depict historical events from actual battles or incidents, such as Above Us the Waves, a 1955 film which depicts the true story of the British Royal Navy's midget submarines attacks on the Tirpitz. Other submarine movies develop a fictional plot created using more or less realistic details of naval warfare, such as the film U-571, which tells the story of a fictional U-boat in World War II.

Other submarine films from the fantasy, science fiction or occasionally horror film genres depict entirely fictitious events, such as the various film versions of Jules Verne's novel 20,000 Leagues Under the Sea.

=== Set before World War I ===
- Hearts in Bondage (1936) – directed by Lew Ayres
- The Hunley (1999) – CSS Hunley attacks a U.S. Navy ship

=== Made before World War II ===
- The Secret of the Submarine (1915) – US action-adventure silent serial directed by George L. Sargent depicting prevention of US submarine from falling into enemy hands
- A Submarine Pirate (1915) – US heist-comedy-short directed by Charles Avery and Syd Chaplin, depicting waiter attempting to foil sea-heist of gold-filled cargo vessel by submarine
- Civilization (1916) – US allegorical-drama directed by Reginald Barker, Thomas H. Ince, Raymond B. West, et al. depicting pacifist German Count's construction of submarine with order to sink ocean liner Lusitania presumably also carrying enemy munitions; a.k.a. La cruz de la humanidad, a.k.a. Civilização
- The Little American (1917) – US action-drama directed by Cecil B. DeMille and Joseph Levering, depicting ship of young Americans returning to ancestral French home torpedoed by a German U-boat and witness to German brutality while imprisoned; a.k.a. A Pequena Americana, a.k.a. La petite américaine
- On the Jump (1918) – US comedy directed by Raoul Walsh, depicting US reporter who joins Liberty Loan campaign before he must rescue his girlfriend and stolen secret fuel formula from German agent rendezvousing with a German U-boat
- Patriotism (1918) – US mystery-drama directed by Raymond B. West, depicting search in Scotland for German agent sending vital information to German U-boat fleet off the Scottish coast
- Behind the Door (1919) – US action-drama directed by Irvin Willat, depicting German-American naval officer who takes revenge against the German U-boat commander who brutalized his wife after sinking his ship; a.k.a. Detrás de la puerta
- The False Faces (1919) – US espionage-drama directed by Irvin Willat, depicting a thief who becomes a reluctant US agent and infiltrates German U-boat to deliver vital enemy information; a.k.a. The Lone Wolf
- The Isle of Conquest (1919) – US adventure-drama directed by Irvin Willat, based on Arthur Hornblow novel, about a man and woman marooned on a deserted isle after their ship is sunk by a German U-boat
- Mare Nostrum (1926) – directed by Rex Ingram
- Submarine (1928) – directed by Frank Capra
- Men Without Women (1930) – fictional USS S-13
- The Sea Ghost (1931) – a.k.a. U-67
- A Woman of Experience (1931)
- Morgenrot (1933)
- Hell Below (1933) – USS AL-14
- Dark Journey (1937) – UK adventure-thriller directed by Victor Saville
- Submarine D-1 (1937)
- Submarine Patrol (1938) – directed by John Ford
- Chetvyortyy periskop (1939) – the Soviet film
- The Spy in Black (1939) – a.k.a. U-Boat 29
- Thunder Afloat (1939)

=== Made during World War II ===
- Three Little Sew and Sews (1939) – US comedy short directed by Del Lord, depicting the Three Stooges as sailors working in a ships' tailor shop tricked into stealing a submarine by Nazi spies
- 49th Parallel (1941) – a U-boat is sunk in Hudson's Bay, leaving the surviving crewmen stranded in northern Canada
- U-Boote westwärts! (U-Boat, Course West!) (1941) – German war film promoting Kriegsmarine and Unterseeboot service
- Crash Dive (1943) – fictional USS Corsair
- T-9 Submarine (1943) – the Soviet movie
- Destination Tokyo (1943) – fictional USS Copperfin
- Gung Ho (1943) – fictional account of the Makin Island raid
- The Silver Fleet (1943) – British drama directed by Vernon Sewell and Gordon Wellesley, depicting a Dutch submarine builder forced to work for the Nazis
- Submarine Alert (1943) – US thriller directed by Frank McDonald, depicting a former gangster supplying German U-boat commanders with torpedoes in South America
- Submarine Base (1943) – US drama directed by Albert H. Kelley, depicting Nazi spies using a stolen shortwave transmitter prototype to broadcast top secret shipping info to an offshore Imperial Japanese Navy submarine
- We Dive at Dawn (1943) – UK action-drama directed by Anthony Asquith, depicting fictional submarine HMS Sea Tiger on a mission to sink fictional German battleship Brandenburg
- Two-Man Submarine (1944) – US B-movie directed by Lew Landers

=== Later films depicting World War II ===
- The Damned (1947) – directed by René Clément
- Morning Departure (1950) – directed by Roy Ward Baker. A British film about a crew aboard a disabled submarine during a rescue operation.
- Mystery Submarine (1950) – directed by Douglas Sirk, depicting a mission to destroy a U-boat off the coast of South America; a.k.a. Phantom Submarine
- Operation Pacific (1951) – fictional USS Thunderfish
- Submarine Command (1951) – US drama directed by John Farrow, depicting a US submarine commander forced to confront the consequences of sudden high-sea submersion while the crew remain outside the submarine
- Ubåt 39 (U-Boat 39) (1952) – Swedish drama directed by Hampe Faustman, depicting the crew of U-39
- Torpedo Alley (1953) – US drama directed by Lew Landers, depicting a US Navy pilot rescued at sea by submarine before applying for submarine duty; a.k.a. Down Periscope
- Submarine Attack (La grande speranza) (1954) – Italian action-romance directed by Duilio Coletti, depicting an Italian submarine sinking Allied shipping during the Battle of the Atlantic; a.k.a. Torpedo Zone
- Above Us the Waves (1955) – Royal Navy midget submarines vs. German battleship Tirpitz
- Haie und kleine Fische (1957) – Four young German naval cadets begin their military service in 1940; only one of them will survive - Based on the novel of the same name
- Hellcats of the Navy (1957) – fictional USS Starfish
- Sea Wife (1957) – US action-drama directed by Bob McNaught and starring Richard Burton and Joan Collins, depicting a cargo ship dangerously jammed to excess capacity with evacuees fleeing the 1942 Japanese invasion and Battle of Singapore that is sunk by a Japanese Imperial Navy submarine; one scene depicts the submarine underwater while another scene shows the submarine on the surface
- The Enemy Below (1957) – US action-drama directed by Dick Powell, depicting a duel between an American destroyer escort and a German U-boat in South Atlantic
- Run Silent, Run Deep (1958) – fictional USS Nerka (which loosely shares plot elements and the villain destroyer captain, Bungo Pete, with Edward L. Beach's novel, but not much of the plot)
- Submarine Seahawk (1958) – US action-drama directed by Spencer Gordon Bennet depicting a US submarine commander on a reconnaissance mission to locate a fleet of Imperial Japanese Navy fighting ships; a.k.a. Submarine X-2
- Torpedo Run (1958) – US drama directed by Joseph Pevney, depicting a US submarine commander confronted with destroying an Imperial Japanese Navy ship with Allied prisoners and civilians
- U 47 – Kapitänleutnant Prien (1958) – fictionalized combat career of Günther Prien
- Battle of the Coral Sea (1959) – USS Dragonfish
- Operation Petticoat (1959) – US comedy directed by Blake Edwards, depicting fictional USS Sea Tiger; remade in 1977 TV series Operation Petticoat
- Orzeł (The Eagle) (1959) – Polish drama directed by Leonard Buczkowski, depicting ORP Orzeł and Orzeł incident
- Up Periscope (1959) – US drama directed by Gordon Douglas, depicting a US Navy frogman on mission aboard a submarine to be smuggled into Japanese-held island; a.k.a. Up Periscope!
- Nacht fiel über Gotenhafen (Darkness Fell on Gotenhafen) (1960) – German film about the sinking of the Wilhelm Gustloff by the Soviet submarine S-13. The film is about the maritime disaster, not about the submarine.
- McHale's Navy (TV series), McHale and His Schweinhunds [Season 2, Episode 3] (1963) – US comedy episode directed by Sidney Lanfield, depicting a PT boat crew destroying a German U-boat rendezvousing with a Japanese patrol
- Mystery Submarine (1963) – UK action-drama directed by C.M. Pennington-Richards, depicting a British captured U-boat used for a mission
- Beta Som (Torpedo Bay) (1963) – Italian-French drama directed by Charles Frend and Bruno Vailati, depicting a British warship and Italian submarine operating in the Strait of Gibraltar and meeting in the neutral Rick's Cafe; a.k.a. Défi à Gibraltar
- Morituri (1965) – US drama directed by Bernhard Wicki, depicting German blackmailed by English to impersonate SS officer aboard ship; a.k.a. Saboteur: Code Name Morituri
- McHale's Navy (TV series), 36-24-73 [Season 4, Episode 23] (1966) – US comedy episode directed by Hollingsworth Morse, depicting a PT boat crew capturing a German U-boat
- Submarine X-1 (1969) – X class submarines
- Murphy's War (1971)
- Commander of the Lucky 'Pike' (1972), the Soviet movie
- Operation Petticoat (TV series) (1977–79) – comedy directed by Hollingsworth Morse, depicting fictional USS Sea Tiger; spinoff of 1959 film Operation Petticoat, producing 32 episodes
- 1941 (1979) – US comedy directed by Steven Spielberg, depicting an Imperial Japanese Navy submarine terrorizing the California coast
- Das Boot (1981) – German movie about U-96
- O vozvrashchenii zabyt (1985), the Soviet film, about S-131
- Slushat v otsekakh (1985), the Soviet TV-movie
- Sekretny farvater (1986–87), the Soviet TV miniseries
- War and Remembrance (TV miniseries) (1988)
- Das letzte U-Boot (The Last U-Boat) (1993) – a German television film about U-234
- U-571 (2000) – fictional U-571
- Below (2002) – fictional USS Tiger Shark (horror)
- In Enemy Hands (2004) – fictional USS Swordfish and U-429; a.k.a. U-Boat
- Ghostboat (2006) – mystery-thriller based on George E. Simpson and Neal R. Burger novel, directed by Stuart Orme, depicting fictional HMS Scorpion lost during World War II and resurfacing near the end of the Cold War
- 真夏のオリオン (Battle under Orion) (2009) – Japanese action-drama directed by Tetsuo Shinohara, depicting an Imperial Japanese Navy submarine against a US destroyer near the end of the war; a.k.a. Manatsu no Orion, Last Operations Under the Orion
- Die Gustloff (2008) – German television drama about the sinking of the Wilhelm Gustloff. Really the story of the maritime disaster, but does feature a few scenes aboard the Soviet submarine S-13
- The Sinking of the Laconia (2010) – British-German historical drama directed by Uwe Janson about the sinking of the former British ocean liner RMS Laconia by U-156, which then, with three other U-boats (including U-507) and an Italian submarine, attempted to rescue nearly 2,000 passengers
- Torpedo (Also known as U-235) – a Belgian film (2019)

=== Korean War ===
- Submarine Command (1951) – fictional USS Tiger Shark

=== Cold War ===
- Morning Departure (1950) – British drama directed by Roy Ward Baker depicting the crew of a sunken British submarine trapped on the sea floor; a.k.a. Operation Disaster
- Hell and High Water (1954) – American action-adventure directed by Samuel Fuller, depicting a World War II surplus Japanese submarine battling a Chinese submarine
- On the Beach (1959) – produced and directed by Stanley Kramer, depicting fictional nuclear submarine USS Sawfish (SSN-623) in the aftermath of a nuclear war
- Voyage to the Bottom of the Sea (1961) – adventure-science fiction film directed by Irwin Allen, depicting fictional SSRN Seaview; remade in the 1964 TV series Voyage to the Bottom of the Sea
- Voyage to the Bottom of the Sea (TV series) (1964) – adventure-science fiction, directed by Jus Addiss depicting fictional SSRN Seaview; spinoff of 1961 film Voyage to the Bottom of the Sea
- The Bedford Incident (1965)
- The Russians Are Coming, the Russians Are Coming (1966) – American comedy directed by Norman Jewison, depicting fictional Soviet submarine Спрут; a.k.a. The Russians Are Coming! The Russians Are Coming!
- Ice Station Zebra (1968) – fictional USS Tigerfish (in novel: USS Dolphin)
- Mission Impossible (TV series), "Submarine" (1969) – American action-adventure episode directed by Paul Krasny, depicting former SS officer with plans to fund Neo-Nazis
- The Boatniks (1970) – comedy directed by Norman Tokar, depicting a salami in a submarine torpedo tube
- Assault on the Wayne (1971) – fictional missile submarine USS Wayne (also named in The Spy Who Loved Me)
- The Spy Who Loved Me (1977) – American, British and Soviet submarines
- Gray Lady Down (1978) – fictional USS Neptune
- Bear Island (1979) – fictional U.S. Science Year team on remote island discover a World War II submarine base to which the SS had dispatched two U-boats with holds full of gold bullion from the conquest of Europe. SS, ex-Nazis, sons of U-boat commanders, Israelis, all try to recover the enormous wealth.
- Raise the Titanic (1980) – U.S. submarine confronts a Soviet warship and escorts the salvaged Titanic to port
- Virus (1980) – fictional HMS Nereid
- Incident at Map Grid 36-80 (1982) – the Soviet movie, about U.S. submarine
- Never Say Never Again (1983) – fictional U.S. submarine
- The Fifth Missile (1986) – fictional USS Montana
- The Dolphin's Cry (1986) – the Soviet movie
- Russkies (1987) – the Soviet submarine
- Full Fathom Five (1990) – fictional USS Aspen versus Alpha Victor Three class submarine CCCP Kirov
- The Rift (1990) – fictional Siren II searches for lost Siren I
- The Hunt for Red October (1990) – fictional Red October (Красный Октябрь), fictional V.K. Konovalov (В. К. Коновалов), USS Dallas, DSRV-1 Mystic
- Going Under (1991) – Comedy – An American submarine races to get a nuclear weapon before a Russian submarine.
- Buried on Sunday (1992) – a Soviet submarine is used to launch a missile attack on Canada's Wonderland
- Silent Service (1995) – anime; JMSDF Seabat (Japan's first nuclear-powered submarine)
- Hostile Waters (1997) – K-219
- K-19: The Widowmaker (2002) – K-19
- Phantom (2013) – K-129, the plot has a basis in one theory about the events aboard the Soviet submarine's final voyage

=== Post-Cold War ===
- Fer-de-Lance (1974) - TV movie, fictional nuclear submarine USS Fer-de-Lance, released on video as Operation Serpent
- Crimson Tide (1995) – USS Alabama
- Down Periscope (1996) – comedy directed by David S. Ward, depicting fictional USS Stingray (SS-161)
- Peculiarities of the National Fishing (1998)
- Phantom: The Submarine (1999), about fictional South Korea's first nuclear-powered submarine Phantom.
- On the Beach (2000) – fictional Los Angeles-class submarine USS Charleston (SSN-704)
- Danger Beneath the Sea (2001)
- 72 Meters (2004)
- Phantom Below (2005)
- Solar Attack (2006)
- Critical Situation (2008) - TV series, episode 10 "Running Out of Air" about AS-28 training accident
- Last Resort (2012–13) – TV series, fictional Ohio-class submarine, USS Colorado (SSBN-753)
- Black Sea (2014)
- Hunter Killer (2018)
- Kursk (2018)
- The Wolf's Call (2019)
- Vigil (2021) – TV series, season one largely on fictional Vanguard-class submarine, HMS Vigil

=== Other conflicts ===
- Ghazi Shaheed (1998)
- The Ghazi Attack (2017), first Indian underwater/war-at-sea film

=== Future or fantastic past ===
- Le voyage à travers l'impossible (An Impossible Voyage) (1904) – French adventure-comedy silent short directed by Georges Méliès, depicting Geographic Society members on an around-the-world journey using various modes of transport including a submarine; a.k.a. The Voyage Across the Impossible, a.k.a. The Impossible Voyage; predecessor to 1907 silent film 20,000 lieues sous les mers
- 20,000 Thousand Leagues Under the Sea (1907, 1916, 1954, 1997, 1997) – Jules Verne's fictional Nautilus (science fiction/fantasy)
- The Secret of Two Oceans (1957) – based on Grigory Adamov's novel, about the crew of the Soviet submarine "Pioneer"
- The Atomic Submarine (1959) – fictional USS Tiger Shark battles an underwater alien spacecraft/submarine
- Voyage to the Bottom of the Sea (1961) – Seaview nuclear submarine, the film was followed by a TV series 1964–68
- The Fabulous World of Jules Verne (1958) – based on Jules Verne's Facing the Flag, featuring HMS Sword
- The Three Stooges in Orbit (1962) – comedy directed by Edward Bernds, depicting the Three Stooges assisting an inventor with a new military hybrid (tank, helicopter, submarine) vehicle to aid in defense of a Martian invasion
- Atragon (1963) – fictional Gotengo (science fiction/fantasy)
- Stingray (1964–1965) – adventures of the WASPs (the World Aquanaut Security Patrol) (Supermarionation)
- Fantastic Voyage (1966) – set in the near future, an experimental submarine with special medical team aboard are reduced to microscopic size and injected into body of a brain-damaged scientist possessing military secrets in an attempt to repair his injury
- Around the World Under the Sea (1966)
- Yellow Submarine (1968) – animated musical film inspired by the music of The Beatles, directed by George Dunning with art direction by Heinz Edelmann
- Captain Nemo and the Underwater City (1969) – Jules Verne's fictional Nautilus (science fiction/fantasy)
- The Neptune Factor (1973) – undersea rescue (science fiction)
- The Land That Time Forgot (1975) – depicts a stranded World War I U-boat crew on uncharted South-Atlantic sub-continent of "Caprona"
- The Return of Captain Nemo (1978) – Jules Verne's fictional Nautilus (science fiction/fantasy)
- Thundersub (1979) – (anime)
- Virus (1980) – Japanese-made post-apocalyptic thriller featuring an international cast aboard a British sub, trying to find a cure to a global pandemic.
- The Abyss (1989) – fictional USS Montana (science fiction/fantasy)
- Nadia: The Secret of Blue Water (1989) – Jules Verne's fictional Nautilus (anime)
- seaQuest DSV (1993) – (science fiction/fantasy)
- Blue Submarine No. 6 (1998) – (anime)
- The League of Extraordinary Gentlemen (2003) – Jules Verne's fictional Nautilus (fantasy)
- Submarine 707R (2004) – (anime)
- The Life Aquatic with Steve Zissou (2004) – US adventure-comedy-drama directed by Wes Anderson
- Lorelei: The Witch of the Pacific Ocean (2005) – (World War II, science fiction)
- Tide-Line Blue (2005) – (anime)
- The Land That Time Forgot (2009) – action-sci-fi directed by C. Thomas Howell, depicting a stranded World War II U-boat crew in a time void on an island inside the Bermuda Triangle
- Arpeggio of Blue Steel (2013) – (anime)
- Nautilus (2024) - Jules Verne's fictional Nautilus, TV series, prequel to and reimagining of the Verne novel Twenty Thousand Leagues Under the Seas.
- Iron Lung (2026) - sci-fi-horror set almost entirely inside a midget submarine with a one-person crew.

== See also ==
- List of fictional ships
- List of underwater science fiction works
- Nautical fiction
- Sea in culture
