= Hanezu =

2011 film

- Directed by: Naomi Kawase
- Screenplay by: Naomi Kawase
- Based on: Hanezu by Masako Bando
- Cinematography: Naomi Kawase
- Edited by: Naomi Kawase; Tina Baz; Yusuke Kaneku
- Music by: Hasiken
- Production company: Kumie
- Release dates: 19 May 2011 (Cannes); 3 September 2011 (Japan)
- Running time: 91 minutes
- Country: Japan
- Language: Japanese

Hanezu (Japanese: 朱花の月, translit.Hanezu no tsuki) is 2011 Japanese drama film directed and written by Naomi Kawase, based on a novel by Masako Bando. The title is an ancient Japanese word for a shade of red, taken from the 8th century poetry collection Man'yōshū. The story is set in contemporary time in the Asuka area and recalls the ancient history of the place. The film premiered In Competition at the 2011 Cannes Film Festival.

== Cast ==
- Tohta Komizu as Takumi
- Hako Oshima as Kayoko
- Tetsuya Akikawa as Tetsuya
- Akaji Maro as Yo-chan
- Taiga Komizu as Hisao, Takumi's grandfather
- Kirin Kiki as Takumi's mother
- Norio Nishikawa as Takumi's father
- Miyako Yamaguchi as Kayoko's mother

== Production ==
The film was produced through Kumie in co-production with the Kashihara-Takaichi Regional Administrative Association. It was shot on 16 mm film on location in the Nara Prefecture, which is where director Naomi Kawase comes from and lives. The actors had no rehearsals, instead Kawase made them live in the region for a month prior to filming in order to create their characters, which were further developed through discussions with the director. Once filming, Kawase tried to restrict each scene to one take only.
