= Sweet Bean =

2015 film

- Theatrical release poster

Japanese name
- Kanji: あん
Transcriptions
- Revised Hepburn: An
- Directed by: Naomi Kawase
- Screenplay by: Naomi Kawase
- Based on: An by Durian Sukegawa
- Produced by: Kōichirō Fukushima; Yoshito Ohyama; Masa Sawada
- Starring: Kirin Kiki; Masatoshi Nagase; Kyara Uchida
- Cinematography: Shigeki Akiyama
- Edited by: Tina Baz
- Music by: David Hadjadj
- Production companies: Comme des Cinémas; Nagoya Broadcasting Network; Twenty Twenty Vision Filmproduktion; Aeon Entertainment; Kumie; Poplar Publishing; Hakuhodo; Elephant House; The Asahi Shimbun; ZDF/Arte; MAM Film
- Release dates: 14 May 2015 (Cannes); 30 May 2015 (Japan)
- Running time: 113 minutes
- Country: Japan
- Language: Japanese
- Box office: ¥234 million (Japan)

Sweet Bean (Japanese: あん, Hepburn: An) is a 2015 Japanese drama film directed by Naomi Kawase. It is the second film, after I Wish, to star real-life grandmother and granddaughter Kirin Kiki and Kyara Uchida. The film was selected to open the Un Certain Regard section at the 2015 Cannes Film Festival. It was also selected to be screened in the Contemporary World Cinema section of the 2015 Toronto International Film Festival.

== Plot ==
Sentaro is a middle-aged man who runs a small dorayaki shop in the outskirts of Tokyo. The shop is frequented by locals and secondary-school pupils alike. When he puts up a notice saying that he is looking for a co-worker, he is approached by Tokue, a lady in her mid-seventies, who states that she has always wanted to work in a dorayaki shop. Sentaro initially rejects her application, afraid that the work would prove too much for the old lady who, moreover, has somewhat deformed hands. However, he is swayed when he tries Tokue's anko (red bean paste); its taste and texture are far superior to that of the factory-made bean paste Sentaro has been using. Sentaro asks Tokue to start making bean paste with him, revealing that up until now, he did not actually like his own product.

Business begins to thrive, and very soon Tokue also starts serving customers and packaging dorayaki. However, when customers hear that the deformities to Tokue's hand were caused by leprosy, they stop coming. Sentaro reluctantly gives Tokue some time off but, realizing what has happened, Tokue decides to quit, and does not return to the shop. Wakana, a school girl whom Sentaro has befriended, eventually suggests that they go and visit Tokue at the sanatorium where she and other patients were forced to stay until the 1996 repeal of the 1953 Leprosy Prevention Law. Sentaro feels guilty that he was not able to protect Tokue against the prejudice of their customers, but she assures him that she is grateful for the time she was allowed to spend at the shop.

When Tokue dies of pneumonia a few months later, she leaves Sentaro her own bean paste making equipment, as well as a cassette recording intended for him and Wakana. In it, Tokue stresses that a person's worth lies not in their career, but simply in their being, and also that joy comes from taking in the sensory experiences of the world that surrounds us.

Through most of the film, Sentaro had been a man weighed down by his past. When Tokue no longer works for the shop, he sends her a letter, in which he reveals that he once seriously injured a man in a pub brawl, something he is still ashamed of. He was subsequently imprisoned and was ordered to pay a large reparation to the victim. Physically, Sentaro is tied to the dorayaki shop, which is owned by the loan shark that furnished the money for the reparation—money which Sentaro has not yet been able to pay back. Yet at the end of the film, Sentaro is seen selling dorayaki from his own stall in the local park, and it is clear he has learned to live with his circumstances.

== Cast ==
- Kirin Kiki as Tokue
- Masatoshi Nagase as Sentaro
- Kyara Uchida as Wakana
- Etsuko Ichihara
- Miyoko Asada as the shop owner's wife
- Miki Mizuno

== Title ==
For its debut at the Cannes Film Festival, the film was promoted under the title Sweet Red Bean Paste. At other festivals — and for the Australian release — the original Japanese title An was used. The subsequent international theatrical release title for the film became Sweet Bean. The English translation of the novel on which the film is based is titled Sweet Bean Paste (Oneworld Publications 2017, written by Durian Sukegawa, translated by Alison Watts).

== Themes ==
The film centres primarily around the themes of freedom and joy, suggesting that by embracing our sensory experiences we may attain richer, more rewarding lives. As Deborah Young writes, "The undercurrent that runs through the film is a message to learn from nature and enjoy the wonder of life moment by moment, no matter what hard knocks you're dealt". This aspect of the film ties in with the director's earlier work, "A consistent underlying concern of [which] has been the unspoken bond between man and his environment". The film's plot contain echoes to such films as The House Is Black and Yomeddine.

== Reception ==
The film has grossed ¥234 million in Japan. The film received generally positive reviews. Sweet Bean has an approval rating of 85% on review aggregator website Rotten Tomatoes, based on 60 reviews, and an average rating of 7.2/10. The website's critical consensus states:" Sweet Bean's deliberate pace demands patience, but the satisfying simplicity of its story -- and Kirin Kiki's absorbing performance -- yield an array of riches well worth the wait". Metacritic assigned the film a weighted average score of 60 out of 100, based on 16 critics, indicating "mixed or average reviews". The film was a "Critic's Pick" by The New York Times, with the Times' Glenn Kenny scoring it at 90 out of 100, writing that "The movie, beautifully shot and acted, earns its ultimate sense of hope by confronting real heartbreak head-on, and with compassion". The Guardian‘s film critic Peter Bradshaw scored the film at 2 out of 5 stars, writing that "Despite some touching moments, and earnest performances, I must confess to feeling exasperated by the sentimentality and stereotype being served up". However, the Observer's chief film critic, Wendy Ide, writes in The Guardian "the quality of the dignified, understated performances here prevents the picture from tipping into cloying sentimentality" and gives it 4 out of 5 stars. Ide mentions "The deceptive simplicity of this intimate, handsomely photographed picture parts like curtains to reveal something a little more knotty. What at first seems to be a reaction against the acceleration of contemporary culture...later serves as a window on to a less palatable element of Japan’s past." Odie Henderson for Roger Ebert gave Sweet Bean 3 out of 4 stars, calling it "a gentle, unassuming work" that "has the potential for arthouse sleeper status." The Irish Time's Tara Brady gives it 4 out of 5 stars and writes "This film is unabashedly sentimental and defined by themes that might, in other movies, seem cornier and syrupier than a bowl of Frosties: find your own path, it's never too late, all things are connected. Sweet Bean's gentle, quiet drama shares DNA with the work of Kawase's compatriot, Hirokazu Koreeda. Sweet by name, sweet by nature."

=== Accolades ===
The film earned actress Kirin Kiki the Best Performance by an Actress award at the 2015 Asia Pacific Screen Awards.

At the 2015 São Paulo International Film Festival, Sweet Bean won Best Foreign Feature Film (Audience Award).

Also in 2015, Naomi Kawase won the Best Director award at the Valladolid International Film Festival.
