= Oolong (disambiguation) =

Oolong is a kind of Chinese tea.

Oolong may also refer to:

== Fictional characters ==
- Oolong, a main character from Yie Ar Kung-Fu
- Oolong (Dragon Ball), a character in the Dragon Ball series

== Other uses ==
- Oolong (programming language), an assembler for the Java virtual machine
- Oolong (rabbit), a Japanese rabbit that was an internet phenomenon
- Oolong, New South Wales, a locality in New South Wales, Australia
- Udon, a Japanese noodle called oolong in Chinese

== See also ==
- Oolong Creek, a stream running through Dalton, New South Wales, Australia
- Oolong Island, a fictional location from the DC Comics series 52
- Ulong (disambiguation)
