= Sakana (disambiguation) =

Sakana is a type of Japanese snack.

Sakana may also refer to:

== People ==
- Sakana-kun, Japanese illustrator, ichthyologist and television personality

== Technology ==
- Sakana AI, an artificial intelligence company based in Tokyo

== Media ==
=== Books ===
- Hi no Sakana, 1960 novel by Murō Saisei

=== Film ===
- Seiji: Riku no Sakana, 2012 Japanese film

=== Music ===
- "Chokkan 2 (Nogashita Sakana wa Ōkiizo!)", 2005 single by Morning Musume
- Sora tob sakana, Japanese idol girl group
