= Machiko Ono =

Japanese actress (born 1981)

- 尾野 真千子
- Born: November 4, 1981 (age 45); Nishiyoshino, Nara Prefecture, Japan
- Occupation: Actress
- Years active: 1997–present
- Agent: Tom Company
- Spouses: Unknown (m. 2015; div. 2017); Unknown (m. 2021)

Machiko Ono (尾野 真千子(おの まちこ), Ono Machiko; born November 4, 1981) is a Japanese actress.

== Early life and career ==
Machiko Ono was born on November 4, 1981, in the small village of Nishiyoshino, Nara (now part of Gojō City), Nara Prefecture. Her family consist of her mother, father, and three older sisters.

Born in a rural area of Nara Prefecture, Ono was spotted by the film director Naomi Kawase cleaning out the shoe boxes at her junior high school, and cast in the lead role in Kawase's Suzaku, which earned the filmmaker the Camera d'Or at the 1997 Cannes Film Festival. Ono won the best actress award at the Singapore Film Festival for her role. After appearing in films by directors such as Shinji Aoyama, Akihiko Shiota, Nobuhiro Yamashita, and Isao Yukisada, Ono again starred in a Kawase film, The Mourning Forest, which won the Grand Prix at the 2007 Cannes Film Festival.

Also appearing on television, Ono was selected in an audition of 1850 actresses to play the coveted lead role in NHK's Asadora entitled Carnation which began broadcasting in October 2011.

== Personal life ==
In July 2015, Ono married an "ordinary man" who was eleven years her senior after dating for a year, and was the managing director of the talent agency LDH. The marriage only lasted two years before divorcing in September 2017, citing "differences in lifestyle and personal values" that arose amidst her busy schedules. In May 2021, she got remarried to a non-celebrity man, who is ten years her senior, again after only dating for a year. The couple resides in the village of Nakijin, Okinawa.

== Selected filmography ==
=== Film ===
Year	Title	Role	Notes	Ref.
1997	Suzaku	Michiru	Lead role	
2000	Eureka	Mikiko Sawai		
2004	Crying Out Love in the Center of the World			
2004	The Taste of Tea			
2006	Funky Forest	Mīko		
2006	Crickets			
2007	The Mourning Forest	Machiko	Lead role	
2008	Climber's High	Chizuko Tamaki		
2011	Ogawa no Hotori	Ikuhisa		
2012	Gaiji Keisatsu	Hina Matsuzawa		
2012	The Floating Castle	Chiyo		
2012	The Castle of Crossed Destinies	Yanagisawa Yoshiyasu		
2013	The Detective Is in the Bar 2	Yumiko Kawashima		
2013	The Apology King	Misaki Ube		
2013	Like Father, Like Son	Midori Nonomiya		
2014	Nishino Yukihiko no Koi to Bōken	Manami		
2014	Kiki's Delivery Service	Osono		
2015	Bali Big Brother	Shōko Terukawa		
2015	Solomon's Perjury	Ryōko Nakahara		
2015	Being Good	Masami		
2015	Terminal	Saeko Yūki		
2016	The Summit of the Gods	Ryōko Kishi		
2016	Too Young To Die!	Naomi Kamei		
2016	Black Widow Business	Tomomi Nakase		
2016	Museum	Haruka		
2017	The Blue Hearts			
2017	When Will You Return?	Tomoko Ashimura	Lead role	
2017	Miracles of the Namiya General Store	Harumi Tamura		
2018	Dynamite Graffiti	Tomiko		
2018	Kuso-yarō to Utsukushiki Sekai			
2018	Modest Heroes	Mama (voice)		
2019	The Stormy Family	Miyoko Suzuki		
2019	Shadowfall	Hisako Anzai		
2021	A Family	Yuka Kudō		
2021	Tomorrow's Dinner Table	Asumi		
2021	A Madder Red	Ryōko Tanaka	Lead role	
2022	Soul at Twenty	Keiko Asano		
2022	Anime Supremacy!	Kayako Arishina		
2022	Sabakan / Summer Days 1986			
2022	This Is Amiko	Amiko's mother		
2022	Thousand and One Nights	Nami		
2023	Plastic			
2023	The Dry Spell	Kazumi Iwakiri		
2023	Confess to Your Crimes	Hatsumi Teranaka		
2024	DitO			
2025	Taste and Tears	Yuka (30 years later)		
2025	Bullet Train Explosion	Yuko Kagami		
2026	Busshi	Satomi Iida		
2026	Yakushima's Illusion	Megumi		
2026	The Ogre's Bride	Kosetsu Nadeshiko		
2026	You, Like a Star	Honoka Aono		
2026	The Man Who Carried the Voices of August	Sachie Egi		
2027	The Tiger and Her Wings: The Movie	Narrator		
2027	Ama	Kozue Funatomi		

=== Television ===
Year	Title	Role	Notes	Ref.
2006	Imo Tako Nankin	Hanaoka Masae	Asadora	
2008	Nadeshiko Tai			
2008	The Flying Tire	Sugimoto		
2009	Hi no Sakana	Orimi Tochiko		
2009	Gaiji Keisatsu	Hina Matsuzawa		
2009	The Policeman's Lineage	Kumiko Moriya	Miniseries	
2010	Mother	Michiki Hitomi		
2010	Joker: Yurusarezaru Sōsakan	Nezu Miyoko		
2010	They Call Me a Fake Doctor: The Last Nurse Practitioner	Nakazen Yumi	Television film	
2011	Namae o Nakushita Megumi	Anno Chihiro		
2011	Carnation	Ohara Itoko	Lead role; Asadora	
2013	Matrimonial Chaos	Hamasaki Yuka		
2013	Meoto Zenzai	Chyouko	Lead role	
2014	Gokuaku Ganbo	Kaoru Kanzaki		
2015	Fujiko	Fujiko Uehara		
2016	Hello, I Love You	Mina Umeda	Lead role	
2016	Soseki Natsume and his Wife	Kyoko Nakane	Lead role	
2016	Sogeki	Ryōko Kōzuki	Lead role; television film	
2018	In This Corner of the World	Keiko Kuromura		
2019	The Voice Calling Your Name	Youko Suzuki	Lead role; miniseries	
2020–21	Awaiting Kirin	Iroha-dayū	Taiga drama	
2022	Because We Forget Everything	F		
2024	The Tiger and Her Wings	Narrator	Asadora	
2024	Light of My Lion	Aoi Tachibana		
2025	Asura	Makiko	Lead role	
2025	Totto no Ketsuraku Seishun-ki	Chō Kuroyanagi	Television film	
2025	The Man Who Carried the Voices of August	Sachie Egi	Television film	
2026	Yamada-Todoroki Law Firm	Narrator	Single episode drama	
2026	Blossom	Fuko Dobashi	Asadora	
2026	Kidnap Game	Uemura Sonomi	Japanese-Hong Kong-South Korean series	

=== Dubbing ===
- Minions: The Rise of Gru (Belle Bottom)
