= Firefly (2000 film) =

Japanese feature film from 2000

- Directed by: Naomi Kawase
- Written by: Naomi Kawase
- Produced by: Takenori Sentô
- Starring: Yūko Nakamura
- Cinematography: Masami Inomoto
- Edited by: Naomi Kawase
- Release date: 2000
- Running time: 164 min
- Country: Japan
- Language: Japanese

Firefly (Japanese: 組画, Hepburn: Hotaru) is a 2000 Japanese drama film directed by Naomi Kawase. It was her second drama feature after her 1997 debut drama feature Suzaku and won the FIPREPSCI Prize at its 2000 debut at Locarno for its "personal and universal approach towards the conflict between tradition and modernity". Like Suzaku, the film explores life in rural Japan and draws on Kawase's background as a documentary filmmaker. Together, these two films established Kawase as one of Japan's key contemporary female directors.

== Plot ==
Ayako, a striptease dancer, falls in and out of a relationship with Daiji, a potter, and returns to her childhood hometown in Nara province, Japan.

== Cast ==
- Yūko Nakamura as Ayako
- Toshiya Nagasawa as Daiji
- Miyako Yamaguchi as Yasuko

== Reception ==
Winner of the FIPREPSCI Prize and the C.I.C.A.E. Award at the Festival del film, Locarno, 2000.

Yūko Nakamura won Best Actress at BAFICI (Buenos Aires International Independent Film Festival), 2001.
