= Sweet Bean Paste (novel) =

Novel by Japanese author Durian Sukegawa

- Author: Durian Sukegawa (pen name)
- Language: Japanese
- Set in: Japan
- Publisher: OneWorld Publications
- Publication place: Japan
- English publication date: 2017
- ISBN: 1786071959

Sweet Bean Paste (Japanese: あん, Hepburn: An) is a 2013 novel by Japanese author Durian Sukegawa (pen name for Tetsuya Akikawa). It tells the story of an elderly woman, a middle-aged man, and a young girl who come together in an unusual companionship to explore friendship, life, and meaning. The English translation, by Alison Watts was published in 2017.

== Synopsis ==
The central character, Sentaro, is a middle-aged man who manages Doraharu, a shop that sells dorayaki, a type of Japanese pancake filled with sweet bean paste, in the outskirts of Tokyo. Sentaro is a man who has lost all hope and motivation in life and is working to pay off debt. One day at the shop Sentaro is approached by Tokue Yoshii, an elderly woman who states that she has always wanted to work in a dorayaki shop. Sentaro initially rejects her application, afraid that the work would prove too difficult for an elderly woman who has a physical disability. However, he is swayed when she drops off a tub of delicious homemade sweet bean paste and says she will work at one-third of the advertised pay. Tokue's paste is far superior to the factory-made product he has been using.

The new paste leads to an increase in customers and as business begins to thrive Tokue starts serving customers and packaging dorayaki. A local schoolgirl who frequents the shop, Wakana, develops a friendship with the pair.

However, when customers realize that Tokue's visible physical disability was caused by leprosy, they stop coming to the shop, and as a result, Tokue stops coming to work.

Eventually, Wakana suggests that she and Sentaro go and visit Tokue at the sanatorium where she and other leprosy patients were forced to live until 1996 when Japan repealed the Leprosy Prevention Law.

In the novel we learn that Tokue became a resident of the Tensheon National Sanatorium at the age of 14. Everything was taken from her on entrance, including her name, to prevent her family from becoming outcasts. Her hands were deformed from the disease. She married, but her husband was forcibly sterilized. Although Tokue was free to leave Sanatorium in 1996, with no family claiming her she must live out the remainder of her life in the sanatorium. Sentaro expresses his regret about being unable to protect Tokue against the prejudice of his customers when he visits her, but she assures him that she is grateful for the time she spent in the shop.

Tokue dies of pneumonia. She leaves Sentaro a letter that he receives several months later. In it, Tokue stresses that a person's worth lies not in their career but simply in their being and that joy comes from taking in the sensory experiences of the world around us.

== Background ==
Durian Sukegawa studied oriental philosophy at Waseda University, before going on to work as a reporter in Berlin and Cambodia in the early 1990s. He has written a number of books and essays, TV programs and films. He lives in Tokyo. Alison Watts is a freelance translator, translating literature from Japanese into English. She lives in Ibaraki, Japan.

== Reception ==
The book was an international bestseller. The Japan Times wrote "Sukegawa's writing style, delicately translated by Alison Watts, is well-matched to the subject matter: a slow, muted movement that gently guides the reader, while leaving the unnecessary unsaid. It is a very Japanese book, centering around the belief that peace — if not happiness — can be found in the discipline of pursuing one thing toward perfection." Library Journal's review stated that the book, "tells an endearing, thoughtful tale about relationships and the everyday meaning of life." Book Riot, a popular book review blog, listed the book as one of, "10 books that feel like Wes Anderson movies."

== Movie adaptation ==
Sweet Bean is a 2015 Japanese drama film directed by Naomi Kawase. The film was selected to open the Un Certain Regard section at the 2015 Cannes Film Festival. It was also selected to be screened in the Contemporary World Cinema section of the 2015 Toronto International Film Festival. The author asked Kawase to shoot the movie after hearing her say, "People do not always die satisfied. When I film, I convert people who died with regret and emptiness into a modern drama."
