= Ogawa no Hotori =

- DVD cover
- Directed by: Tetsuo Shinohara
- Written by: Yasuo Hasegawa; Kenzaburō Iida
- Based on: Ogawa no Hotori by Shuhei Fujisawa
- Starring: Noriyuki Higashiyama; Rinko Kikuchi
- Cinematography: Takahide Shibanushi
- Music by: Satoshi Takebe
- Distributed by: Toei Company
- Release dates: June 18, 2011 (Yamagata Prefecture); July 2, 2011 (Japan)
- Running time: 103 minutes
- Country: Japan
- Language: Japanese

Ogawa no Hotori (Japanese: 小川の辺), also known as At River's Edge, is a 2011 Japanese jidaigeki film directed by Tetsuo Shinohara, adapted from the novel of the same name by Shuhei Fujisawa.

== Cast ==
- Noriyuki Higashiyama as Sakunosuke Inui
- Rinko Kikuchi as Tazu
- Kataoka Ainosuke VI as Morie Sakuma
- Ryo Katsuji as Shinzō
- Machiko Ono as Ikuhisa
- Tatsuya Fuji as Chūzaemon Inui
- Chieko Matsubara as Ise
- Takashi Sasano as Gonnojō Sukegawa
- Tokuma Nishioka
