= The Secret of Two Oceans =

- Russian: Тайна двух океанов
- Directed by: Konstantine Pipinashvili
- Written by: Grigory Adamov; Vladimir Alekseev; Konstantine Pipinashvili; Nikolai Rozhkov
- Starring: Sergey Stolyarov; Igor Vladimirov; Sergei Golovanov; Pyotr Sobolevsky; Vakhtang Ninua
- Cinematography: Feliks Vysotsky
- Music by: Aleksi Machavariani
- Release date: March 25, 1957
- Country: Soviet Union
- Language: Russian

The Secret of Two Oceans (Russian: Тайна двух океанов) is a 1956 Soviet science-fiction adventure film, based on Grigory Adamov's 1939 novel of the same name and directed by Konstantine Pipinashvili.

The film shows how simultaneously, the Soviet ship Arktika and the French ship Victoire suddenly sink in the Atlantic and Pacific Oceans respectively, and how the crew of the Soviet submarine Pioneer investigates.

== Plot ==
In the Atlantic Ocean, the Soviet ship Arktika mysteriously sinks, followed by the explosion of the French vessel Victoire in the Pacific. The crew of the top-secret Soviet submarine Pioner, equipped with advanced technology and unparalleled capabilities, is tasked with uncovering the causes of these disasters.

Amidst the investigation, a foreign agent infiltrates the submarine by impersonating its chief engineer, planning to destroy it with a timed bomb. However, Soviet security operatives onboard and on land thwart the spy’s plans. Their pursuit leads to the discovery of an automated enemy military base launching magnetic torpedoes, which is ultimately neutralized, ensuring the submarine's survival and mission success.

== Cast ==
- Sergey Stolyarov as Vorontsov
- Igor Vladimirov as Skvoreshnya
- Sergei Golovanov as Gorelov
- Pyotr Sobolevsky as Druzhinin
- Vakhtang Ninua as Lortkipanidze
- Sergey Komarov as Professor
- Antonina Maksimova as Bystrykh
- Leonid Pirogov as Bistrikh
- Troadiy Dobrotvorskiy as Bazov (as T. Dobrotvorsky)
- Pavel Luspekayev as Kartsev
- Mikhail Gluzskiy as Ivashev
- Irina Preys as Sidorina (as I. Preys)
- Igor Bristol as Pavlik
