= Staromodnaya komediya =

1978 Soviet film

- Старомодная комедия
- Directed by: Era Savelyeva; Tatyana Berezantseva
- Written by: Aleksei Arbuzov; Vladimir Zheleznikov
- Starring: Alisa Freindlich; Igor Vladimirov
- Edited by: Nadezhda Anikeeva
- Music by: Mikael Tariverdiev
- Production company: Mosfilm
- Release date: 1978
- Running time: 89 minutes
- Country: USSR
- Language: Russian

Staromodnaya komediya (Russian: Старомодная комедия, lit. 'Old-fashioned comedy') is a Soviet full-length colour melodrama film. Released in 1978 by the Mosfilm studio, it was an adaptation of the play of the same name by Aleksei Arbuzov.

== Plot ==
Sanatorium somewhere on the Riga seaside. The main characters of the film are lonely middle-aged people, both about sixty. He is the head doctor of the sanatorium, she is a patient who came for treatment. Their first meeting ends in conflict. He calls her to him about the violation of the sanatorium regime, but the lady turns out to be difficult, with character. At first, this offends the doctor, but soon their relationship improves, and he invites her to a restaurant. Then they meet in the Dome Cathedral at an organ concert and after a long walk around Old Riga, remembering their pre-war youth and talking about everything in the world.

The story ends with the lady having to leave, but she realizes that she is no longer able to do so.

== Cast ==
- Alisa Freindlich as Lydia Vasilievna Zherber, former circus actress
- Igor Vladimirov as Rodion Nikolaevich Semyonov, head doctor of the sanatorium
- Tamara Sovchi as barmaid

== Film crew ==
- Script writers: Aleksei Arbuzov, Vladimir Zheleznikov
- Directed by: Era Savelyeva, Tatyana Berezantseva
- Director of Photography: Boris Kocherov
- Composer: Mikael Tariverdiev
- Production designers: Aleksei Parkhomenko, Konstantin Forostenko
- Songs based on verses by Bella Akhmadulina, Andrei Voznesensky are performed by Alisa Freindlikh, Galina Besedina, Sergey Taranenko

== Reviews ==
Art critic Yevgeny Kalmanovsky in his book "Alisa Freindlich" noted that although the film is more like a "performance shot on film", it does not particularly pretend to anything and hardly has any significance for the history of cinema, it is interesting for the acting work of Alisa Freindlich and Igor Vladimirov, who only benefit from the modesty of the film's cinematic techniques, so that it may well serve as a "good guide to the art" of these performers. Assessing Freindlich's acting, Kalmanovsky points to the actress' wide vocal and plastic abilities, which she skilfully uses to fill the picture with humour and vitality.
