= Ulong =

Ulong may refer to:

- Ulong Island, in the Republic of Palau in the Pacific Ocean, sometimes called Aulong and originally written Oroolong in English
- Ulong channel, a gap in the reef to the west of Ulong Island, popular with divers.
- Ulong, New South Wales, a small town in Australia lying inland from Coffs Harbour.
- Ulong, a tribe in Survivor: Palau, the tenth season, set in Palau, of the American TV series Survivor.
- Ulong is an unsigned long integer datatype in computer programming languages and operating systems
- Ulong tea, an alternate spelling for oolong tea.
- Ulong, a character in the anime franchise Dragon Ball.

== See also ==
- Oolong (disambiguation)
