= Dorayaki =

Japanese confection

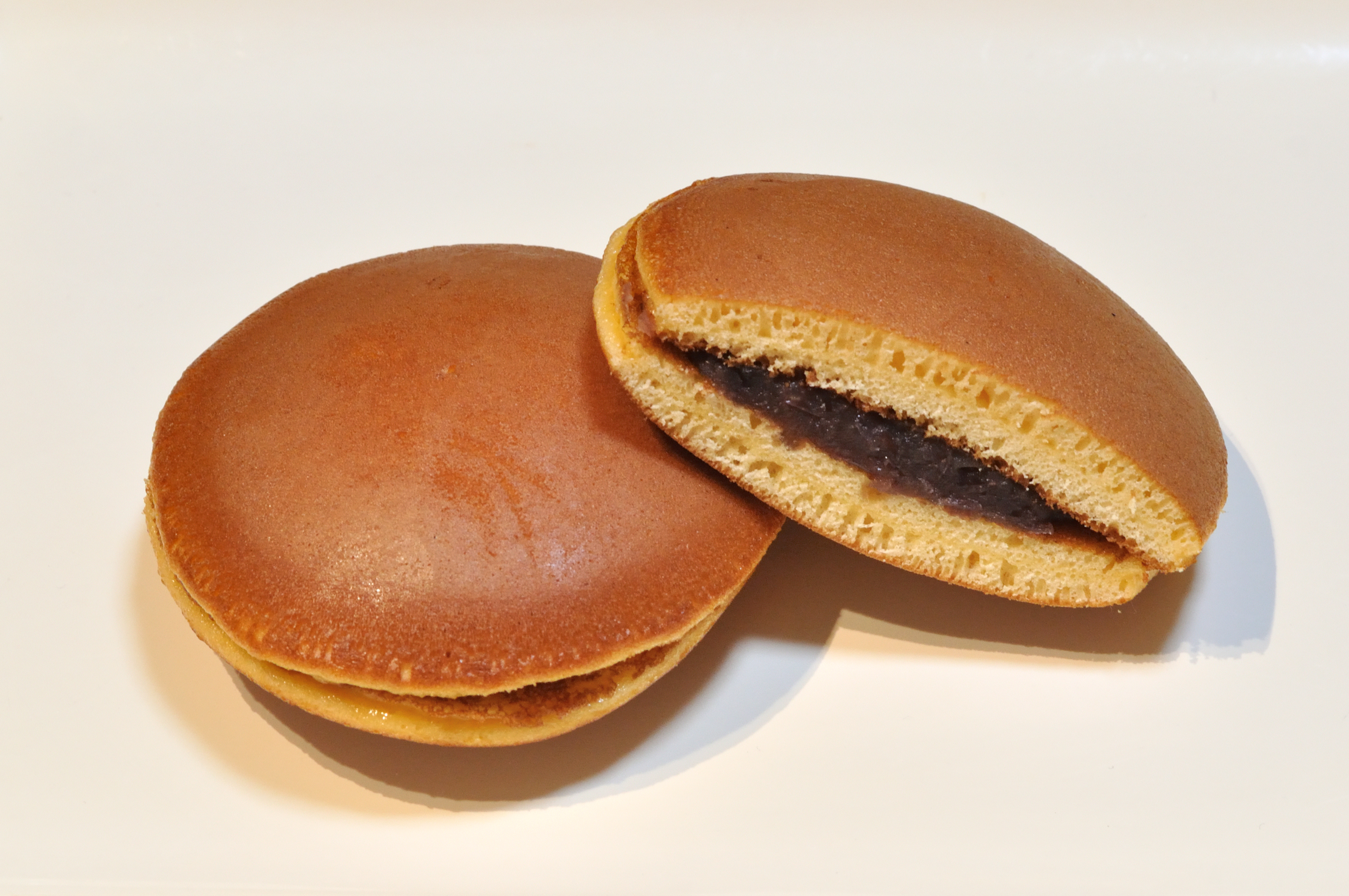
- Alternative names: Mikasa
- Type: Wagashi pancake
- Place of origin: Japan
- Main ingredients: Castella, azuki bean paste
- Variations: Pudding dorayaki, fruit dorayaki, parfait dorayaki

Dorayaki (Japanese: どら焼き, ドラ焼き, 銅鑼焼き, lit. 'gong bake/grill', hence "gong cake") is a type of Japanese confection. It consists of two small pancake-like patties made from castella wrapped around a filling of sweet azuki bean paste.

== Description and history ==
The original dorayaki consisted of only one layer. Its current shape was invented in 1914 by Usagiya in the Ueno district of Tokyo.

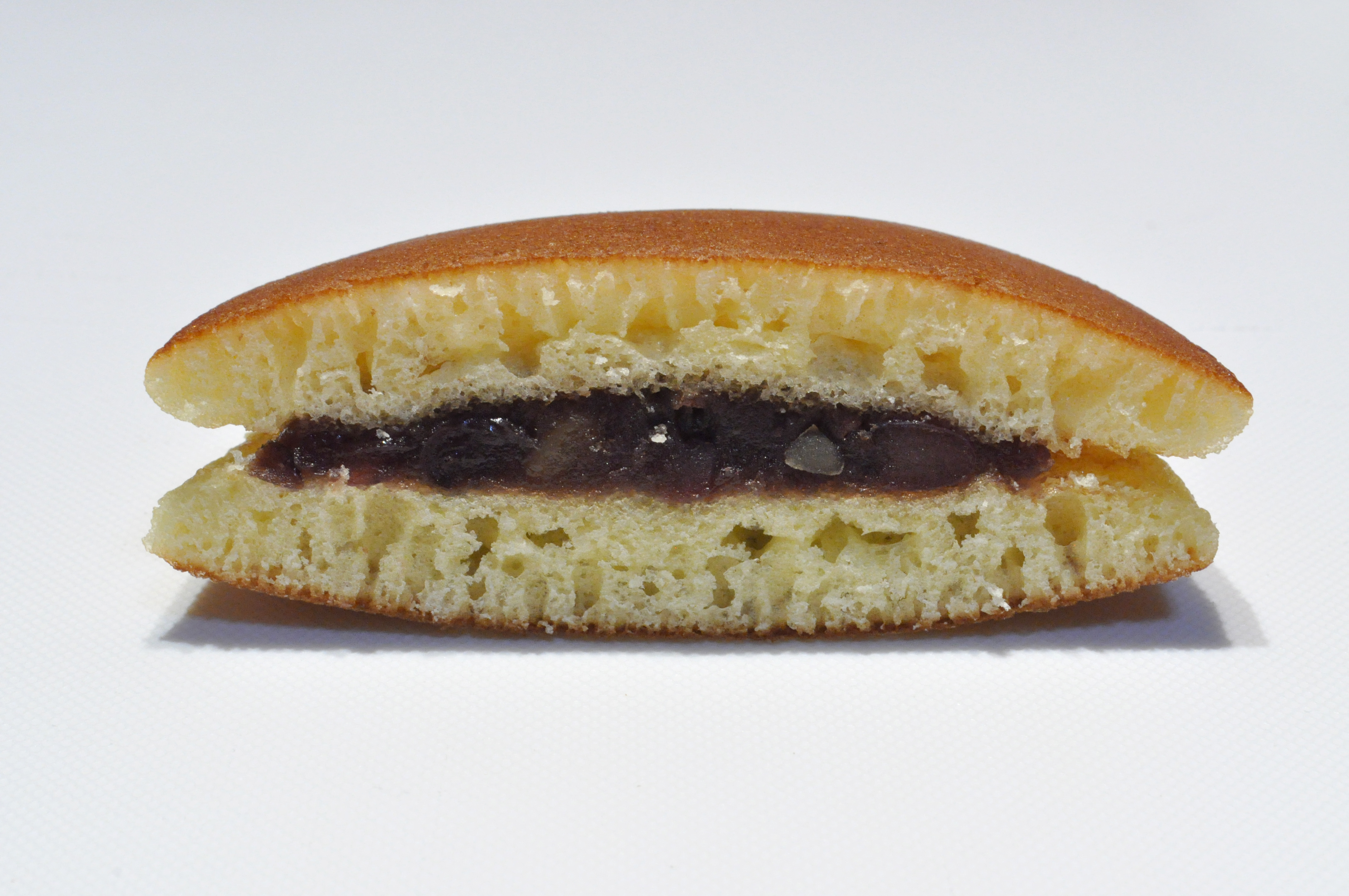
Cross-section of a dorayaki containing azuki bean paste

A dora refers to a Japanese type of "gong" and the name reflects that the original dorayaki was baked/grilled (yaki) on a heated gong, the Kyoto-based confectionery Sasaya Iori states, claiming they invented dorayaki at the request of Toji Temple. There is a rumor that it is probably the origin of the name of the sweet. Legend has it that the first dorayaki were made when a samurai named Benkei forgot his gong (dora) upon leaving a farmer's home where he was hiding, and the farmer subsequently used the gong to fry the pancakes.

Azuki bean paste is normally used by itself, but chestnuts and rice cakes are sometimes added. There are also dorayaki with amanatto. Other varieties include pudding dorayaki, with pudding used instead of azuki bean paste; fruit dorayaki, a dorayaki that uses fruit as the main ingredient; and parfait dorayaki, a hearty dorayaki that looks as if a parfait had been placed inside the dorayaki.

== Regional variation ==
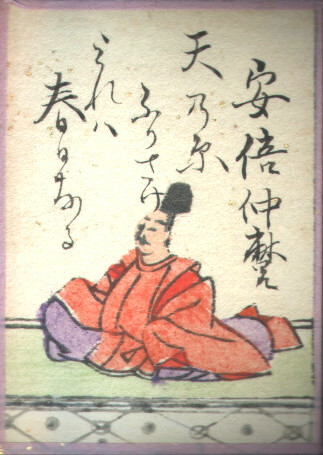
The hyakunin isshu karuta card of Nakamaro's poem

In the Kansai area, this sweet is often called mikasa (三笠), because the round shape resembles the full moon, and is a poetic reference to Abe no Nakamaro's waka where Nakamaro while studying in China nostalgically reminisced on the moon over Mt. Mikasa (Mount Wakakusa) back home in Kasuga, (cf. Kasuga-taisha shrine, Nara). The confection may be made in imitation (mitate (Note: Cf. mitate-e.) of not just the moon but also elements of the top ridge of the Mikasa mountain.

The particular poem is famed, for it is included in the "hundred by hundred poets" anthology, the hyakunin isshu (cf. image right). Nakamaro was known in China as Chō Kō (晁衡/朝衡) (Chao Heng). (Note: A Chinese adapatation of Nakamaro's moon poem is carved in a monument in Xi'an.)

== In popular culture ==
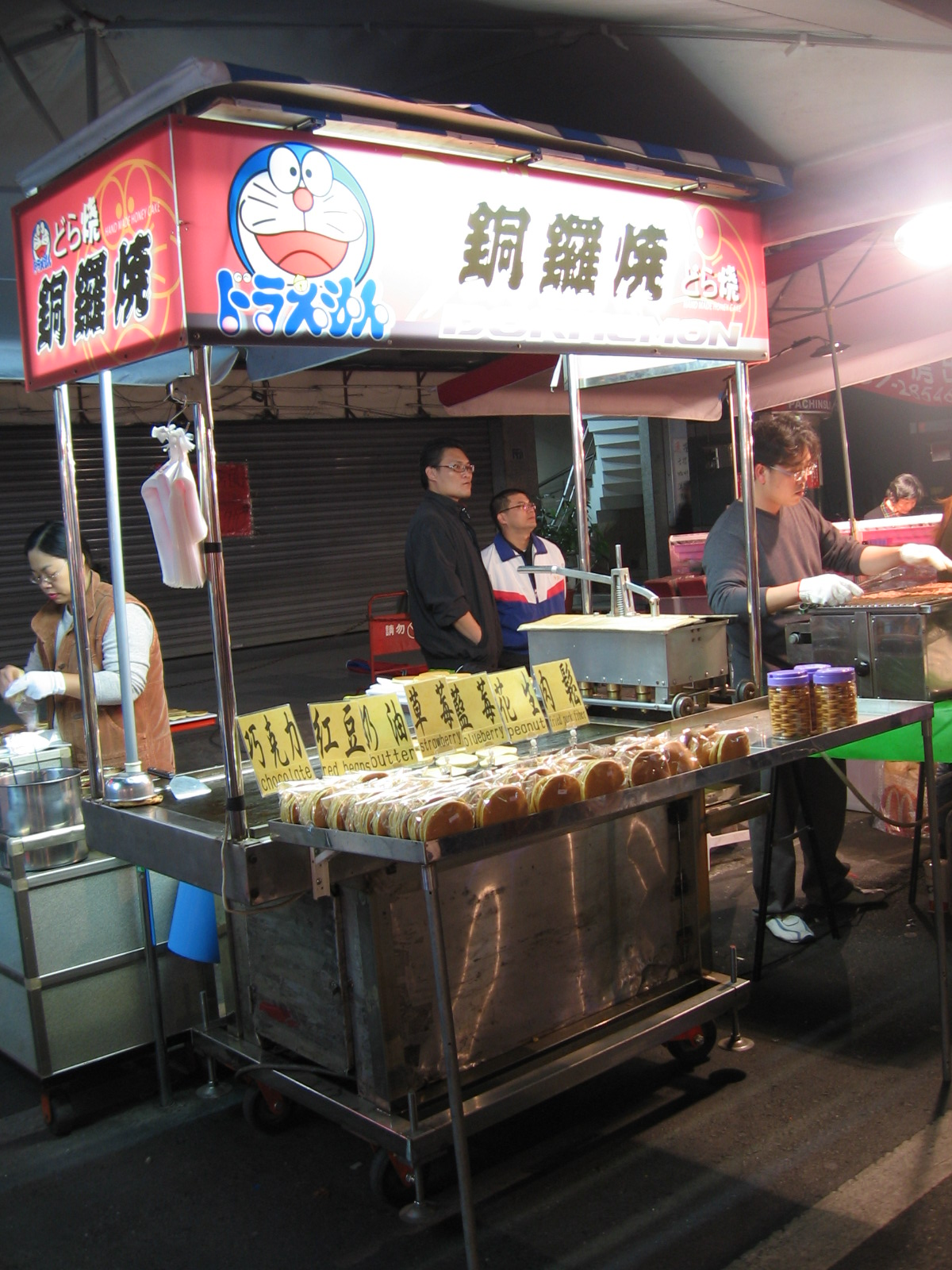
A dorayaki booth featuring Doraemon at the Liouhe Night Market, Kaohsiung, Taiwan

Dorayaki is the favorite food of the Japanese manga and anime character Doraemon from the namesake series. In the English dub, Nobita calls it "yummy buns" as an alternative. The food has been a plot device several times throughout the series. Doraemon is addicted to dorayaki and falls for any trap involving them.

In 2015 filmmaker Naomi Kawase released the film An ("Sweet Bean"), based on a novel, Sweet Bean Paste, by Durian Sukegawa, about an elderly woman who has a secret recipe for dorayaki anko.

== See also ==
- Japonesa - a similar confection eaten in Spain and Gibraltar
- Martabak manis (a.k.a. apam balik, terang bulan, peanut pancake) - a pancake-like confection in Malaysia, Indonesia, Brunei and Singapore. In parts of China it is known as ban jian kueh; in Thailand: khanom thang taek; in the Philippines: tarambulan.
- Chalbori-ppang - a similar confection originating in Korea
- Crumpet - a similar confection originating in the UK
