= Oolong (rabbit) =

Domestic rabbit

Oolong ウーロン
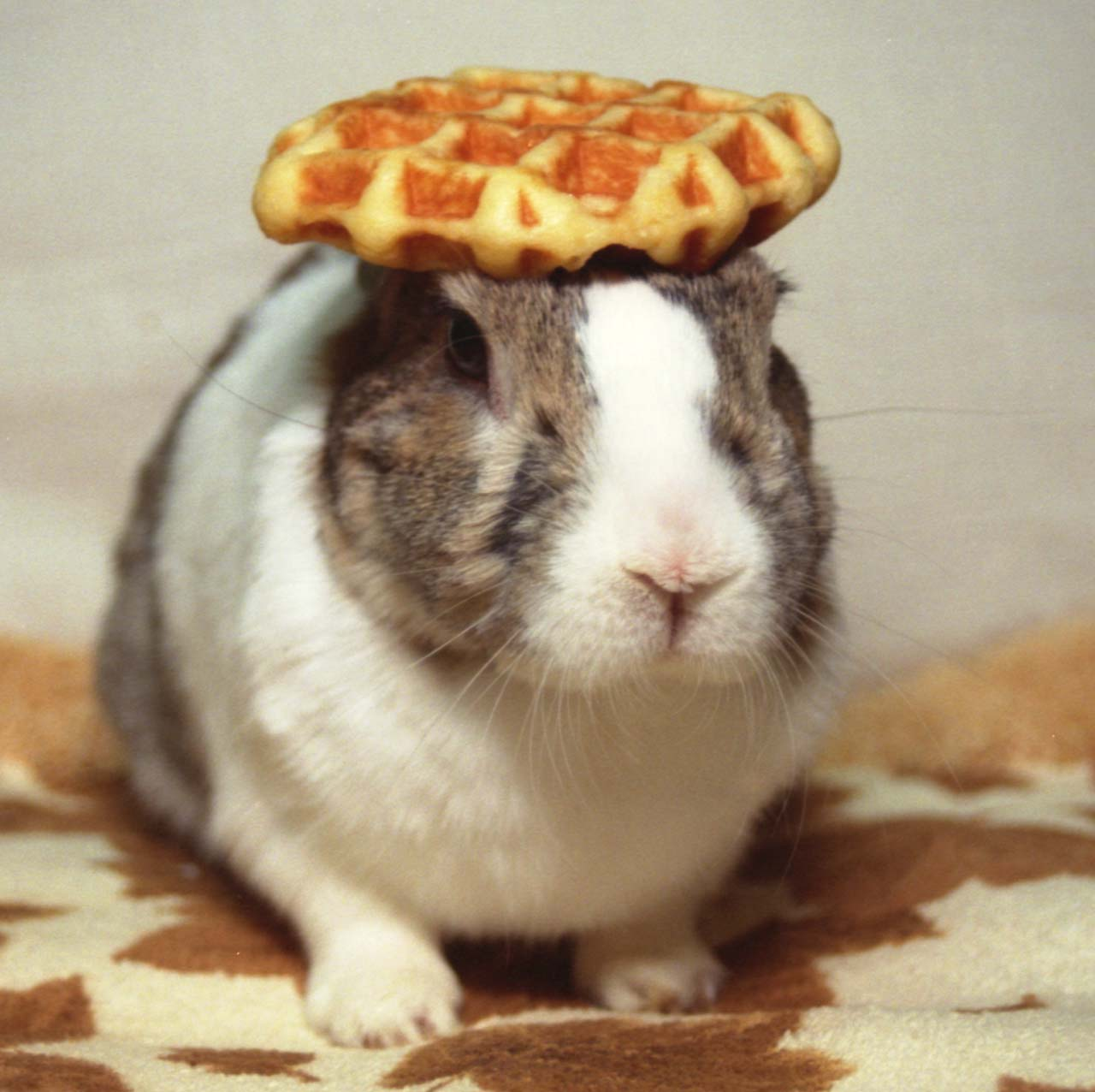
- Oolong balancing a waffle on his head in his last "head performance"
- Other names: Oolong the rabbit; The pancake rabbit
- Breed: Rabbit
- Sex: Male
- Born: July 28, 1994; Hokkaidō, Japan
- Died: January 7, 2003 (aged 8); Hokkaidō, Japan
- Nationality: Japan
- Years active: 1999–2003
- Owner: Hironori Akutagawa
- "Oolong's Photo journal". Archived from the original on December 7, 2008.

Oolong (ウーロン, Ūron; Originated from Chinese: 烏龍; July 28, 1994 – January 7, 2003) was a domestic rabbit owned by Hironori Akutagawa. Oolong became an Internet phenomenon through his owner, Akutagawa, uploading images of the rabbit with objects balanced on his head because of his skills of balancing items such as dorayaki.

Akutagawa's site featured "photo journeys" of Oolong traveling with his master through the house, yard, and other locations. The website became known to a wider audience when it was covered in 2001 by Syberpunk, a site which focuses on odd aspects of Japanese culture.

== History ==
Oolong was trained to balance objects on his head, an art called 'Head Performance' by his owner. The first object balanced on Oolong's head was a 35 mm film canister on 25 May 1999. Akutagawa later used tea cups, bread, fruit, dorayaki, and a rabbit skull. Although most reactions on the Internet were positive, there were some complaints by people who believed the practice to be cruel to animals. In response, Akutagawa wrote in a message to website visitors:

Some visitors have written me e-mails, accusing me of being cruel to my rabbit and that I am abusing my pet. This was never my intention when I included numerous links to photographs, showing Oolong's unique ability to hold objects on his head. This is not a site to mock rabbits, or demonstrate animal abuse. I'm sure you understand it if you see whole my site.

Throughout the rabbit's lifetime, the photographer continued to document his journeys through natural and not-so-natural environments as well as take hundreds of pictures of the rabbit balancing objects. Oolong was noticed by the media, including the New York Times, and became a widespread Internet meme. One of Oolong's photographs was used as an image macro called "Bunny Wafflehead" which featured Oolong balancing a dorayaki on his head. Another photograph showed Oolong with a pancake on his head with the caption "I have no idea what you're talking about... so here's a bunny with a pancake on its head."

Oolong died on January 7, 2003. Akutagawa took photographs of the rabbit's last days alive and included some of them on his website. Oolong was succeeded as Akutagawa's pet by another rabbit named Yuebing (meaning "moon cake"), a Netherland Dwarf.
