= The Mourning Forest =

- Directed by: Naomi Kawase
- Written by: Naomi Kawase
- Release date: May 26, 2007 (Cannes)
- Running time: 97 minutes
- Country: Japan
- Language: Japanese

The Mourning Forest (殯の森, Mogari no mori) is a 2007 Japanese film directed by Naomi Kawase. It won the Grand Prix at the 2007 Cannes Film Festival. It tells the story of a nurse (played by Machiko Ono) who is grieving for her dead child. She works at a nursing home and grows close to an elderly man (Shigeki Uda), suffering from dementia, who is searching in the local forest for something connected to his dead wife that he cannot explain.

== Plot ==
Elder Shigeki lives in a retirement home where he is lovingly cared for by Nurse Machiko, who is grieving the loss of a child. After celebrating Shigeki's birthday, the two take a trip to the countryside. The man, followed by Machiko, goes into the forest and, after two days of walking made difficult by the dense vegetation, they reach the place where Shigeki's wife is buried. Machiko learns that the man has been writing to his wife for 33 years, and is now preparing to write her the last letter.

== Reception ==
The Mourning Forest has an approval rating of 71% on review aggregator website Rotten Tomatoes, based on 7 reviews, and an average rating of 5.4/10.

== Awards ==
- 2007 Cannes Film Festival
  - Awarded as "Grand Prix"

== Cast ==
- Yōichirō Saitō - Machiko's husband
- Kanako Masuda - Mako
- Machiko Ono - Machiko
- Shigeki Uda - Shigeki
- Makiko Watanabe - Wakako
