= Last Operations Under the Orion =

- Film poster
- Kanji: 真夏のオリオン
- Directed by: Tetsuo Shinohara
- Based on: Orion Midsummer by Harutoshi Fukui
- Starring: Hiroshi Tamaki; Yoshikuni Dôchin; Mitsuru Fukikoshi
- Music by: Taro Iwashiro
- Distributed by: Asahi Broadcasting Corporation
- Release date: 13 June 2009 (Japan)
- Running time: 120 minutes
- Country: Japan
- Language: Japanese
- Box office: $5,474,821

Last Operations Under the Orion (Japanese: 真夏のオリオン, Hepburn: Manatsu no Orion), also known as Battle Under Orion, is a 2009 Japanese action drama film directed by Tetsuo Shinohara depicting an Imperial Japanese Navy submarine battling a United States Navy destroyer near the end of World War II.

== Plot ==
The story alternates between the past and present, linked by a fateful song. During World War II, Japanese submarine I-77 battles an American destroyer off the coast of Okinawa. Before heading to war, the captain received a final present from his lover, the score to a song titled Manatsu no Orion. Sixty-four years later, his granddaughter discovers the score and the significance behind the song.

== Cast ==
- Hiroshi Tamaki as Takayuki Kuramoto
- Keiko Kitagawa as Shizuko Arisawa / Izumi Kuramoto
- Yoshikuni Dōchin as Yoshihiko Arisawa
- Mitsuru Fukikoshi as Hiroshi Nakatsu
- Yuta Hiraoka as Makoto Tsubota
- Masaya Kikawada as Hajime Toyama
- Taiga as Katsumi Suzuki

== See also ==
- Das Boot
- Submarine films
- Battle of the Atlantic (1939–1945)
- The Cruel Sea
