= Heaven's Bookstore =

- Theatrical release poster
- Directed by: Tetsuo Shinohara
- Screenplay by: Tetsuo Shinohara; Kyoko Inukai
- Story by: Atsushi Matsuhisa; Wataru Tanaka
- Produced by: Nozomu Enoki; Nobuyuki Tohya; Hideshi Miyajima
- Starring: Tetsuji Tamayama; Yūko Takeuchi; Karina Nose; Yoshio Harada; Teruyuki Kagawa
- Cinematography: Shogo Ueno
- Edited by: Isao Kawase
- Music by: Masataka Matsutoya
- Production companies: Shochiku; Dentsu; Shogakukan; Eisei Gekijo; TV Asahi; Stardust Promotion
- Distributed by: Shochiku
- Release date: June 5, 2004 (Japan)
- Running time: 111 minutes
- Country: Japan
- Language: Japanese

Heaven's Bookstore (Japanese: 天国の本屋, Hepburn: Tengoku no Honya) is a 2004 Japanese drama film directed by Tetsuo Shinohara about a struggling classical pianist who is sent to heaven to work in a bookstore. It is based on two novels, written by Atsushi Matsuhisa and Wataru Tanaka.

== Plot ==
Kenta (Tetsuji Tamayama), a classically trained pianist, is fired from his orchestra and gets drunk in a bar. He wakes up the following morning in what turns out to be a bookstore in heaven. The owner of the bookstore had brought him there, and explains that people live to be 100; people who die before this age go to heaven to live out the rest of their allotted time before they are reborn on earth.

In heaven, he meets Shoko (Yūko Takeuchi), a pianist who he had admired on earth. Together, they start work on a special composition that she had started writing on earth.

Meanwhile, on earth, Shoko's niece Natsuko (also played by Yūko Takeuchi) wants to organise a fireworks display that was discontinued twelve years ago. It turns out that Shoko had been engaged to Takimoto (Teruyuki Kagawa), a talented firework maker, but her hearing had been damaged by a firework accident he caused. As a result, she stopped playing music, he stopped making fireworks, they split up, and later she died.

Natsuko wants Takimoto to make his special 'loving fireworks' for the fireworks display. These are the special fireworks that inspired Shoko to compose her special composition, uncompleted when Takimoto stopped making them. He is vehemently opposed to making fireworks again.

However, at the end of the firework display 'loving fireworks' unexpectedly appear in the sky, set-off by Takimoto. Kenta returns to earth and plays Shoko's now completed composition to accompany them. Natsuko and Kenta meet. She asks how he knows the piece, to which he responds that he met 'her'. In the end, they start laughing together (as the credits begin to roll).

== Cast ==
- Tetsuji Tamayama as Kenta
- Yuko Takeuchi as Shoko / Natsuko
- Karina Nose as Yui (credited as Karina)
- Hirofumi Arai as Satoshi
- Koji Ohkura as Maru
- Yoichiro Saito as Sentaro
- Ayumu Saito as Concert Manager
- Kazuko Kato as Taeko Nagase
- Morio Agata as Ikuro Nagase
- Toshie Negishi as Ota
- Sansei Shiomi as Nishiyama
- Kyōko Kagawa as Sachi Hiyama
- Haruko Wanibuchi as Heaven Coffee Shop Owner
- Hideko Yoshida as Yone
- Senri Sakurai as Tasuke
- Teruyuki Kagawa as Takimoto
- Yoshio Harada as Yamaki
- Akashi Takei
- Yasunari Takeshima as Bookstore Customer
