= Kirin Kiki =

Japanese actress (1943–2018)

- 樹木 希林
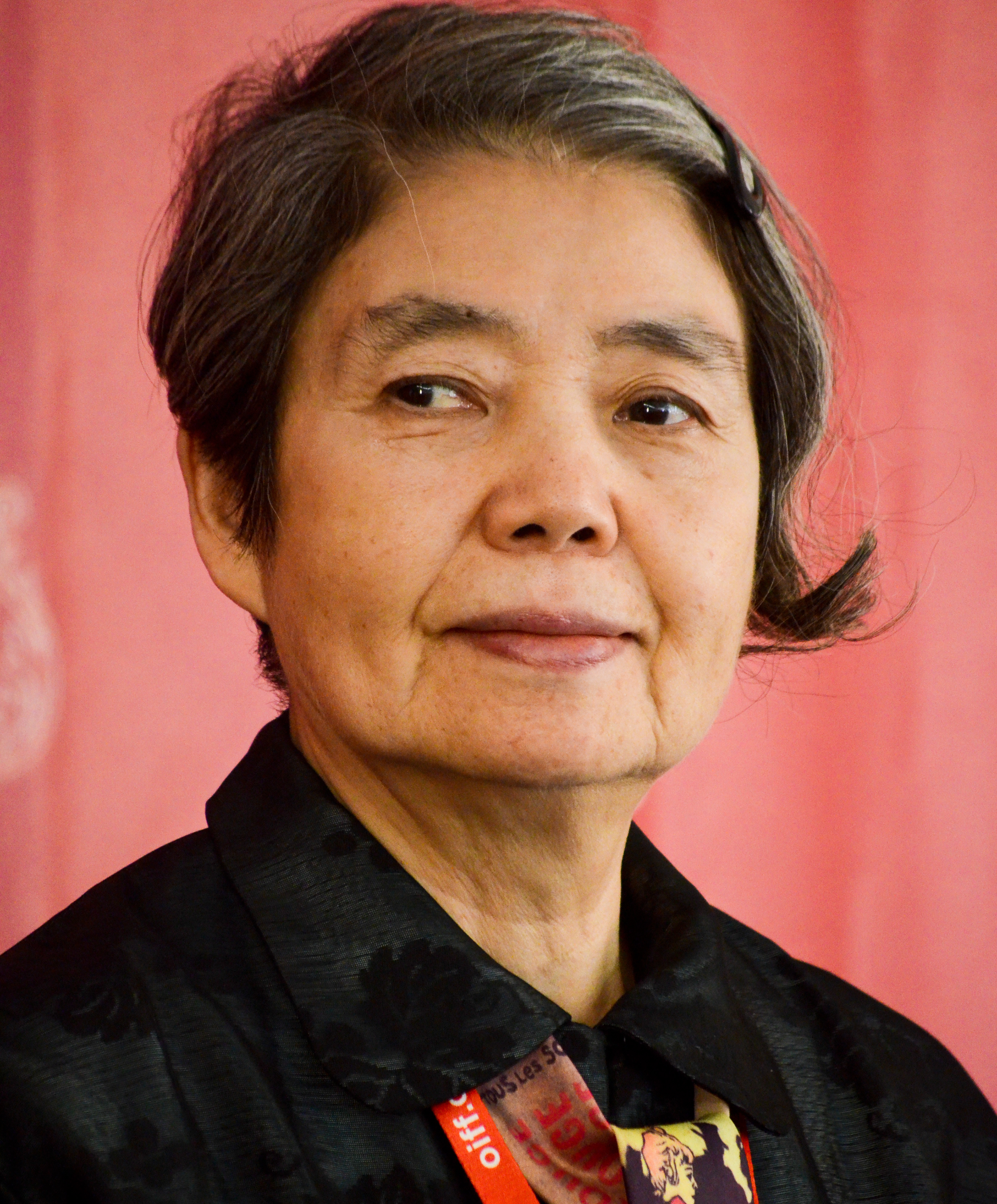
- Kirin Kiki at the 2015 Odesa International Film Festival
- Born: Keiko Nakatani (中谷 啓子, Nakatani Keiko); January 15, 1943; Tokyo, Japan
- Died: September 15, 2018 (aged 75); Tokyo, Japan
- Other names: Chiho Yūki (悠木千帆, Yūki Chiho) first stage name; Keiko Uchida (内田 啓子, Uchida Keiko) current legal name
- Occupation: Actress
- Years active: 1961–2018
- Spouses: Shin Kishida (m. 1964; div. 1968) Yuya Uchida (m. 1973; died 2019)
- Children: 1

Kirin Kiki (Japanese: 樹木 希林, Hepburn: Kiki Kirin; 15 January 1943 – 15 September 2018) was a Japanese actress for Japanese cinema and television.

== Biography ==
Kiki was born on January 15, 1943, in Kanda, Tokyo. Her father was a master of the biwa lute and a former police officer. Her mother owned a cafe in Jinbōchō, Tokyo and a restaurant in Noge, Yokohama, the latter being Kiki's maternal parents' home. Her mother was seven years senior to her father and had a child from both her two previous marriages.

After graduating from high school, she started her acting career in the early 1960s as a member of the Bungakuza theater troupe using the stage name Chiho Yūki (悠木千帆). She eventually gained fame for performing uniquely comedic and eccentric roles on such television shows as Jikan desu yo and Terauchi Kantarō ikka and in television commercials. She changed her name to "Kirin Kiki" when, after being asked on a television show to auction off something of hers, she ended up selling her first stage name, claiming she had "nothing else to sell."

While battling various ailments, including a detached retina in 2003 and breast cancer in 2005, Kiki continued to act and won several awards, including the best actress Japan Academy Prize for Mom and Me, and Sometimes Dad in 2008, the best supporting actress award from the Yokohama Film Festival for her work in Kamikaze Girls and Half a Confession in 2004, and the best supporting actress Blue Ribbon Award for Still Walking in 2008.

== Personal life ==
Kiki married fellow Bungakuza actor Shin Kishida. They separated in 1968. She married musician Yuya Uchida in 1973, and remained legally married to him though they separated in 1975. Their daughter, Yayako Uchida, is an essayist and musician, and portrayed the younger self of Kiki's character in the film Tokyo Tower: Mom and Me, and Sometimes Dad. Yayako Uchida is married to the actor Masahiro Motoki, who was adopted into the Uchida family as a mukoyōshi. Kirin has three grandchildren by her daughter, including actress Kyara Uchida, who has appeared with her in two films, I Wish and Sweet Bean.

Kiki was diagnosed with cancer in 2004 and underwent a mastectomy. She died of cancer, and related illnesses, on 15 September 2018.

== Selected filmography ==
=== Film ===
- Zoku Yoidore hakase (1966) - Fumiko
- Lake of Tears (1966) - Kayo Sugumo
- Tonogata goyôjin (1966)
- Tabiji (1967) - Chie
- Aniki no koibito (1968) - Sanae
- Kamisama no koibito (1968) - Aiko Yamagami
- Dai bakuhatsu (1969)
- Tora-san, His Tender Love (1970) - Maid in Shinshû
- Aka chôchin (1974)
- Akumyo: shima arashi (1974) - Oshige
- Jack and the Beanstalk (1974) - Madam Noir (voice)
- Honô no shôzô (1974)
- Abayo dachikô (1974)
- Mamushi to aodaishô (1975) - Kiku Matsukawa
- Za.Dorifutazu no kamo da!! Goyo da!! (1975) - tomiko
- Eden no umi (1976) - Orittsan
- Sachiko no sachi (1976) - Momoe
- Onna kyôshi (1977) - Yuriko Yokoyama
- Ballad of Orin (1977) - Tama Ichise
- Wani to oum to ottosei (1977) - Mary
- Taro the Dragon Boy (1979) - Yamanba (voice)
- Sochô no kubi (1979) - Okonomiyaki Manager
- Kindaichi Kosuke no boken (1979) - Tane
- Kamisamaga kureta akanbô (1979) - Woman who brought a boy
- Zigeunerweisen (1980) - Kimi
- Otake shinobu no a! Kono ai nakuba ganbasseyo Kuni-chan (1980)
- Tosa No Ipponzuri (1980) - Fuki
- Nogiku no haka (1981) - Omasu
- Tenkōsei (1982) - Naoko Saitoh
- Keiji monogatari (1982) - Sumi Yashiro
- Santô kôkôsei (1982)
- Amagi goe (1983) - Ryosaku's Wife
- Hometown (1983) - Yoshi
- Capone Cries a Lot (1985) - Sene Tachikawa
- Lonely Heart (1985) - Terue Amano
- Yumechiyo nikki (1985) - Kikuyakko
- Kyôshû (1988) - Mine Kamioka
- Tsuru (1988) - Yura
- Daidokoro No Seijo (1988) - Hisajo Sugita
- Kaze no Matasaburô - Garasu no manto (1989) - Otane
- Donmai (1990) - Hanako
- Rainbow Kids (1991) - Kura Nakamura
- Sensou to seishun (1991) - Etsuko Onoki
- Za Chugaku kyoshi (1992)
- The Triple Cross (1992)
- Yearning (1993) - Omatsu
- Rex: A Dinosaur's Story (1993)
- Rampo (1994) - House wife / Head of maid
- Toki no kagayaki (1995) - Nagashima
- Rintaro (輝け！隣太郎, Kagayake! Rintaro) (1995, she also sang the title song (with Toshiaki Karasawa))
- Oishinbo (1996)
- Koi to hanabi to kanransha (1997) - Sanae Mita
- Hissatsu shimatsunin (1997) - Otora
- Ashita heno kakehashi (1997)
- 39 keihô dai sanjûkyû jô (1997) - Defence Counsel Shigure Nagamura
- Zawa-zawa Shimo-Kitazawa (2000) - Fan of Kyushiro
- Drug (2001) - Yoshie Hirakawa
- Tôkyô Marîgôrudo (2001) - Ritsuko Sakai
- Pistol Opera (2001) - Rin
- Danbôru hausu gâru (2001)
- Inochi (2002) - Mother
- Returner (2002) - Xie
- Yoru o kakete (2002)
- Hotaru no hoshi (2003) - Headmistress
- Half a Confession (2004) - Yasuko Shimamura
- Kamikaze Girls (2004) - Momoko's Grandmother
- Izo (2004)
- Chekeraccho!! (2006) - Chisa Haebaru
- Brave Story (2006) - Onba (voice)
- Akai kujira to shiroi hebi (2006) - Midori Ohara
- Tôkyô tawâ: Okan to boku to, tokidoki, oton (2007) - Eiko Nakagawa
- Saido kâ ni inu (2007) - Granny Tome
- Still Walking (2008) - Toshiko Yokoyama
- Tokyo Tower: Mom and Me, and Sometimes Dad (2008)
- Miyagino (2008) - Madam
- The Borrower Arrietty (2010) - Haru (voice)
- Villain (2010) - Fusae Shimizu
- Ghost: In Your Arms Again (2010)
- Ôki-ke no tanoshii ryokô: Shinkon jigoku-hen (2011)
- Hanezu (2011) - Takumi's Mother
- I Wish (2011) - Hideko (Grandmother)
- Chronicle of My Mother (2011) - Yae
- Tsunagu (2012) - Aiko
- Yakusoku: Nabari dokubudôshu jiken shikeishû no shôgai (2013) - Iatsuno okunishi
- Like Father, Like Son (2013) - Riko Ishizeki
- Sweet Bean (2015; Best Performance by an Actress, Asia Pacific Screen Awards 2015) - Tokue
- Our Little Sister (2015) - Fumiyo Kikuchi
- Kakekomi onna to kakedashi otoko (2015) - Genbee
- After the Storm (2016) – Yoshiko
- Mori, The Artist's Habitat (2018) - Hideko Kumagai
- Shoplifters (2018) - Hatsue Shibata
- Every Day A Good Day (2018) - Ms. Takeda
- Cherry Blossoms and Demons (2019) - Yu's Grandmother
- Erica 38 (2019) - Erica's mother (final film role)

=== Television ===
- Shadow Warriors (1980-1986) - Orin
- Hanekonma (1986) - Yae (Hanekonma's mother)
- Tobu ga Gotoku (1990) - Ikushima
- Kimi no Na wa (1991)
- Aoi (2000) - Lady Kasuga

== Honours ==
- Medal with Purple Ribbon (2008)
- Order of the Rising Sun, 4th Class, Gold Rays with Rosette (2014)
