= First Love (2000 film) =

2000 Japanese film by Tetsuo Shinohara

- Film poster
- Directed by: Tetsuo Shinohara
- Written by: Masahiko Nagasawa
- Produced by: Takehiko Chino; Kazuya Hamana; Kazumi Kawashiro; Shohei Kotaki
- Starring: Rena Tanaka; Hiroyuki Sanada; Mieko Harada; Mitsuru Hirata; Makoto Satō
- Cinematography: Junichi Fujisawa
- Music by: Joe Hisaishi
- Production companies: Dynasty; Engine Network; Kadokawa Shoten; TBS; Bandai Visual; Dentsu
- Distributed by: Toei Company
- Release date: April 1, 2000 (Japan)
- Running time: 113 minutes
- Country: Japan
- Language: Japanese

First Love (Japanese: はつ恋, Hepburn: Hatsukoi) is a 2000 Japanese film directed by Tetsuo Shinohara.

== Cast ==
- Rena Tanaka
- Hiroyuki Sanada
- Mieko Harada
- Mitsuru Hirata
- Makoto Satō
- Masaki Nishina
- Nori Horikoshi
- Uchiyama Jikko
- Yōji Tanaka

== Reception ==
It was chosen as the 3rd Best Film at the 22nd Yokohama Film Festival.
