= Igor Vladimirov =

- Игорь Владимиров
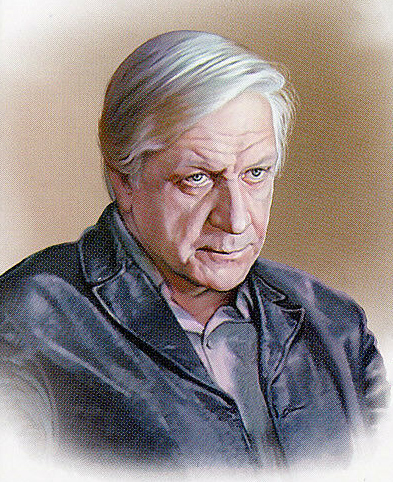
- Vladimirov on a 2018 Russian postcard
- Born: Igor Petrovich Vladimirov; 1 January 1919; Yekaterinoslav, Ukrainian People's Republic
- Died: 20 March 1999 (aged 80); Saint Petersburg, Russia
- Occupations: Actor, theater director, theater teacher
- Years active: 1948–1999
- Spouse(s): Zinaida Sharko (1953–1960); Alisa Freindlich (1960–1981); Inessa Perelygina (to 1999)
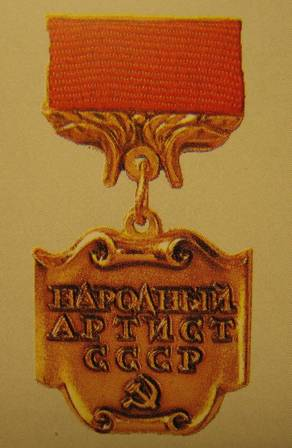
- Awards

Igor Petrovich Vladimirov (Russian: Игорь Петрович Владимиров; 1 January 1919 – 20 March 1999) was a Soviet and Russian actor, theater and film director, and pedagogue. People's Artist of the USSR (1978). From 1960 until his death in 1999 he was the Principal Director of the Lensovet Theatre in Leningrad.

== Biography ==
Vladimirov was born in Yekaterinoslav (now Dnipro). His family soon after birth moved to Kharkiv, and then to Leningrad in 1932.

He died in Saint Petersburg at the age of 80, and was buried at the Bolsheokhtinskoye Cemetery along with his parents.

== Filmography ==
- The Secret of Two Oceans (1956) as Andrei Skvoreshnya
- October Days (1958) as Georgy Blagonravov
- Your Contemporary (1967) as Vasily Vasilyevich Gubanov
- Taming of the Fire (1972) as General Anatoly Golovin
- Wrong Connection (1977) as Rolan Matveyevich Lonshakov
- Old-Fashioned Comedy (1978) as Rodion Nikolayevich Semyonov, head doctor of the sanatorium
- Front in the Rear of the Enemy (1981) as Voldemar Fribe
- Fairy tales... fairy tales... fairy tales of the old Arbat (1982) as Fyodor Kuzmich Balyasnikov
- Lethargy (1983) as Mikhail Nikolayevich Obolensky, composer
- The Life of Klim Samgin (1988) as Andrei Sergeyevich Prozorov

== Awards and honours ==
- Medal "For the Victory over Germany in the Great Patriotic War 1941–1945"
- Medal "For the Defence of Leningrad" (1945)
- Medal "For Valiant Labour in the Great Patriotic War 1941–1945" (1946)
- Medal "In Commemoration of the 250th Anniversary of Leningrad" (1957)
- Honoured Worker of the Arts Industry of the RSFSR (1966)
- Jubilee Medal "In Commemoration of the 100th Anniversary of the Birth of Vladimir Ilyich Lenin" (1970)
- People's Artist of the RSFSR (1974)
- People's Artist of the USSR (1978)
- Order of the Red Banner of Labour (1979)
- Order of Lenin (1990)
- Order of Friendship (1994)
