= Shino Sakuragi =

Japanese writer

- 桜木 紫乃
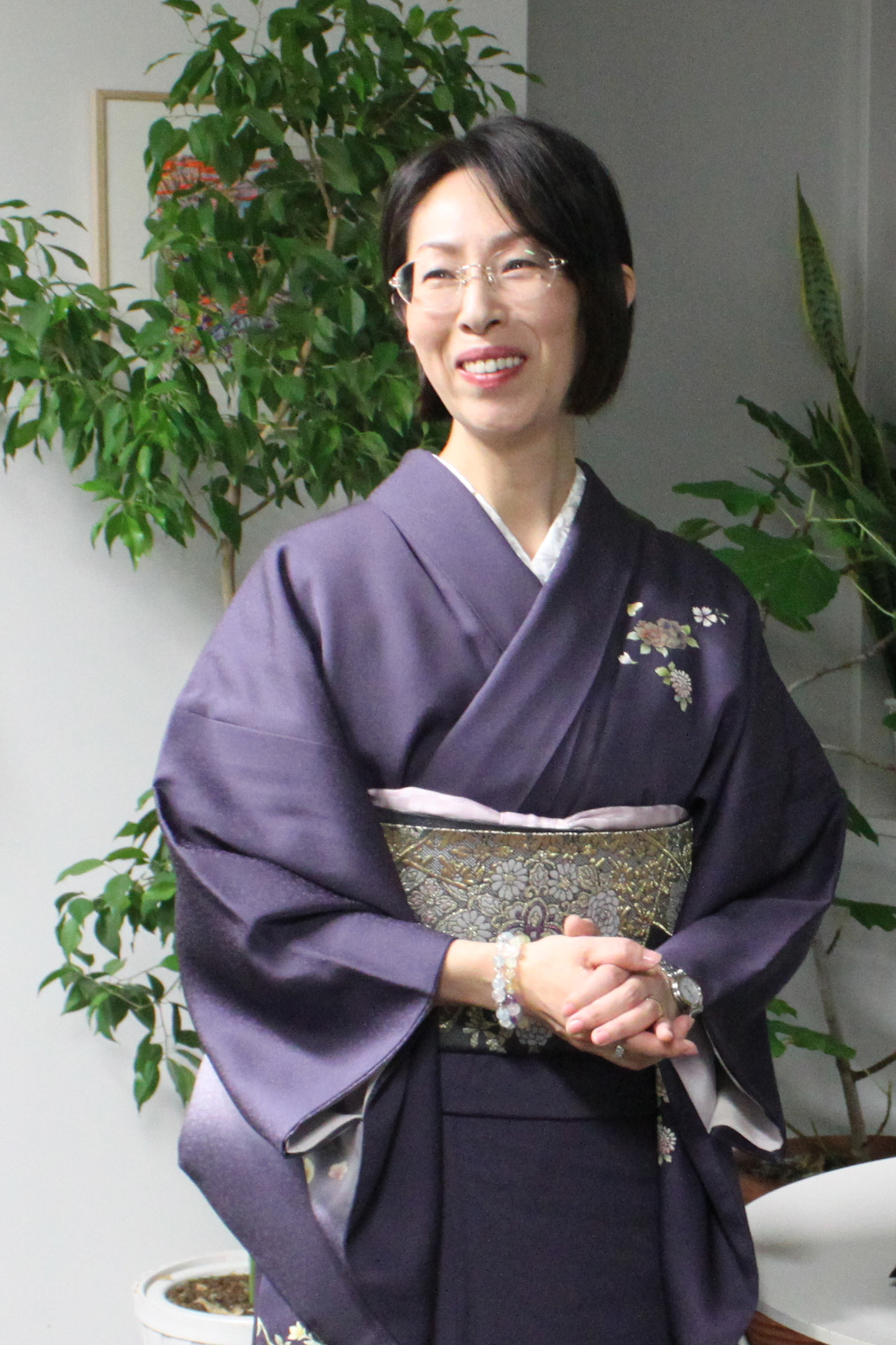
- Born: 1965 (age 60–61); Kushiro, Hokkaido, Japan
- Occupation: Writer
- Writing career
- Language: Japanese
- Genres: Fiction, short story
- Notable works: "Yukimushi"; Loveless; Terminals; Hotel Royal
- Notable awards: All Yomimono Prize for New Writers; Shimase Award for Love Stories; Naoki Prize

Shino Sakuragi (桜木 紫乃, Sakuragi Shino; born 1965) is a Japanese writer. She has won the All Yomimono Prize for New Writers, the Shimase Award for Love Stories, and the Naoki Prize. Her work has been adapted for film and television.

== Early life ==
Sakuragi was born in Kushiro, Hokkaido, Japan in 1965 to parents who owned and ran a local barbershop. After graduating from high school she worked as an official court typist until she got married at the age of 24, then had her first child at age 27 before starting to write in her early 30s.

== Career ==
She won the 2002 All Yomimono Prize for New Writers for her short story "Yukimushi" (雪虫, "Snow Bugs"), but her first book, a short story collection titled Hyōheisen (氷平線, Frozen Horizon), did not appear in print until 2007. In 2010 her book Garasu no ashi (硝子の葦, Reed of Glass) was published by Shinchosha, which also published Raburesu (ラブレス, Loveless) the next year. Loveless won the 19th Shimase Award for Love Stories in 2012 and was nominated for the 146th Naoki Prize, but the prize went to Rin Hamuro. Garasu no ashi was later adapted into a Wowow television drama starring Saki Aibu. In 2012 Sakuragi's short story collection Kishūteneki Tāminaru (起終点駅 (ターミナル), Terminals) was published by Shogakukan. Kishūteneki Tāminaru was later adapted into the film Kishūteneki Terminal, which premiered at the 28th Tokyo International Film Festival.

Sakuragi won the 149th Naoki Prize for her 2013 book Hoteru Rōyaru (ホテルローヤル, Hotel Royal), a set of stories told in reverse chronological order about a love hotel in her hometown of Kushiro, Hokkaido. The short story collections Blues (ブルース, Burūsu) and Hoshiboshitachi (星々たち, Stars) were published in 2014, followed by the 2015 novels Uraru (霧, Mist) and Sore o ai towa yobazu (それを愛とは呼ばず, Don't Call That Love). In 2016 Sakuragi's novel Kōri no wadachi (氷の轍, Tracks in the Ice), about the investigation of an elderly man's death on a Hokkaido beach, was published by Shogakukan and adapted into a TV Asahi television movie starring Ko Shibasaki. Her novel Sajō (砂上), a partly autobiographical story about a writer and editor, was published by Kadokawa Shoten in 2017.

== Personal life ==
Sakuragi is a fan of Golden Bomber. She lives with her family in Ebetsu, Hokkaido.

== Recognition ==
- 2002 All Yomimono Prize for New Writers
- 2012 19th Shimase Award for Love Stories
- 2013 149th Naoki Prize (2013上)

== Film and other adaptations ==
- Kishūteneki Terminal, 2015
- Garasu no ashi, Wowow, 2015
- Kōri no wadachi, TV Asahi, 2016

== Works ==
- Fūsō (風葬, Burial), Bungeishunjū, 2008, ISBN 9784163275703
- Tōgen (凍原, Tundra), Shogakukan, 2009, ISBN 9784093862646
- Koi-hada (恋肌), Kadokawa Shoten, 2009, ISBN 9784048740111
- Garasu no ashi (硝子の葦, Reed of Glass), Shinchosha, 2010, ISBN 9784103277217
- Wan moa (ワン・モア, One More), Kadokawa Shoten, 2011, ISBN 9784041100578
- Raburesu (ラブレス, Loveless), Shinchosha, 2011, ISBN 9784103277224
- Kishūteneki Tāminaru (起終点駅 (ターミナル), Terminals), Shogakukan, 2012, ISBN 9784093863186
- Daremo inai yoru ni saku (誰もいない夜に咲く, Nobody Blooms at Night), Kadokawa Shoten, 2013, ISBN 9784041006528
- Muku no ryōki (無垢の領域, Area of innocence), Shinchosha, 2013, ISBN 9784103277231
- Dakōsuru tsuki (蛇行する月), Futabasha, 2013, ISBN 9784575238358
- Hoteru Rōyaru (ホテルローヤル, Hotel Royal), Shūeisha, 2013, ISBN 9784087714920
- Burūsu (ブルース, Blues), Bungeishunjū, 2014, ISBN 9784163901794
- Hoshiboshitachi (星々たち, Stars), Jitsugyō no Nihonsha, 2014, ISBN 9784408536453
- Uraru (霧, Mist), 2015, Shogakukan, ISBN 9784093864206
- Sore o ai towa yobazu (それを愛とは呼ばず, Don't Call That Love), 2015, Gentosha, ISBN 9784344027336
- Kori no wadachi (氷の轍, Tracks in the Ice), Shogakukan, 2016, ISBN 9784093864503
- Sajō (砂上), Kadokawa Shoten, 2017, ISBN 9784041046005
