= Kishūteneki Terminal =

- Poster
- 起終点駅 ターミナル
- Directed by: Tetsuo Shinohara
- Screenplay by: Yasuo Hasegawa
- Based on: Novel by Shino Sakuragi
- Starring: Kōichi Satō; Tsubasa Honda; Nakamura Shidō II; Machiko Ono
- Music by: Takeshi Kobayashi
- Distributed by: Toei
- Release date: November 7, 2015 (Japan)
- Running time: 111 minutes
- Country: Japan
- Language: Japanese
- Box office: ¥35.2 million

Kishūteneki Terminal (Japanese: 起終点駅 ターミナル), also known as Terminal, is a 2015 Japanese drama film directed by Tetsuo Shinohara, based on the novel by Shino Sakuragi who won the Naoki Prize in 2013. The film's theme song is "Terminal" by My Little Lover. It was released on November 7, 2015.

== Cast ==
- Kōichi Satō as Kanji Washida
- Tsubasa Honda as Atsuko Shīna
- Nakamura Shidō II as Ichiryū Ōshita
- Masato Wada as Takuji Moriyama
- Takuma Otoo as Shinichi Ōmura
- Shigeru Izumiya as Tatsuzō Minami
- Machiko Ono as Saeko Yūki

== Reception ==
The film grossed ¥35.2 million on its opening weekend.
