= Wrong Connection =

Feedback
- Russian: Обратная связь
- Directed by: Viktor Tregubovich
- Written by: Aleksandr Gelman
- Starring: Oleg Yankovsky; Mikhail Ulyanov; Kirill Lavrov; Lyudmila Gurchenko; Igor Vladimirov
- Cinematography: Eduard Rozovsky
- Edited by: Margarita Shadrina
- Music by: Alexey Rybnikov
- Production company: Lenfilm
- Release date: 1977
- Running time: 88 minutes
- Country: Soviet Union
- Language: Russian

Wrong Connection (Russian: Обратная связь) is a 1977 Soviet industrial drama film directed by Viktor Tregubovich.

The film tells about the problems of construction: premature commissioning, mismanagement, poor control, theft and deception.

== Plot ==
The film is set in Novogurinsk, where a large petrochemical complex is under construction. Newly appointed city party committee secretary Leonid Sakulin arrives to take charge. He is soon approached by Vyaznikova, the former head of the plant's planning and economic department, who has been demoted to senior economist. Vyaznikova persistently tries to inform him about the dire situation at the construction site. After reviewing the financial and logistical calculations she provides, Sakulin realizes that the premature commissioning of one section of the plant will severely delay the completion of the entire complex, leading to significant losses for the state. Determined to prevent this, Sakulin opposes the early launch, despite encountering resistance from both the construction management and city officials.

Sakulin escalates the matter to higher authorities, ensuring that the problems at the construction site gain attention at the national level. However, despite support from the regional party committee and the Central Committee, the decision ultimately goes against him. The national leadership determines that delaying the launch of the first section would disrupt industrial plans across the country, causing even greater losses. As a result, the original plan is upheld, though additional resources are allocated from other projects to mitigate the gap between the commissioning of the first section and the full completion of the complex. Sakulin’s efforts highlight the challenges of confronting the inertia of the state machinery, as his battle to prioritize long-term outcomes over short-term gains proves futile.

== Production ==
The film was shot on location at the Nizhnekamsk Oil Refinery, with participation from its workers. Simultaneously, an East German adaptation of the story was released, directed by Lothar Bellag and titled "Rückkopplung."

== Cast ==
- Oleg Yankovsky as Leonid Aleksandrovich Sakulin
- Mikhail Ulyanov as Ignat Maksimovich Nurkov
- Kirill Lavrov as Vladimir Borisovich Okunev
- Lyudmila Gurchenko as Margarita Illarionovna Vyaznikova
- Igor Vladimirov as Rolan Matveyevich Lonshakov
- Mikhail Pogorzhelsky as Pavel Nikolayevich Koznakov
- Vsevolod Kuznetsov as Timonin
- Igor Dmitriev as Gleb Valerianovich Artyushkin
- Dmitri Krivtsov as Viktor Grigorevich Ablov
- Yelena Stavrogina as Vera Vasilyeva
