= Hi no Sakana =

1960 novel by Murō Saisei

Hi no Sakana (Fish of the Fire)
- Mitsu no Ahare & Hi no Sakana
- Author: Murō Saisei
- Original title: 火の魚
- Cover artist: (Kumiko Orimi for "Mitsu no Ahare")
- Language: Classical Japanese
- Published: 1960 Chuokoron-Shinsha
- Publication place: Japan

Hi no Sakana
- Also known as: Fish of the Fire
- Written by: Aya Watanabe
- Directed by: Hiroshi Kurosaki
- Starring: Yoshio Harada; Machiko Ono; Bansuke Kasamatsu; Seiko Takada; Ryo Iwamatsu
- Country of origin: Japan
- Original language: Japanese
- No. of episodes: 1

Production
- Running time: 53 minutes

Original release
- Network: NHK Hiroshima
- Release: July 24, 2009

Hi no Sakana (火の魚, Fish of the Fire) is a Japanese novel by Murō Saisei; it was first published in 1960, and was later adapted into a single episode TV drama that was broadcast on NHK Hiroshima in 2009. The story describes the interactions between an elderly author and a young staffer from a publishing company as they collaborate on a book cover design for the author's latest novel.

Saisei based the interactions on her own experience when she was writing Mitsu no Ahare (Aware) (蜜のあはれ), and was working with book designer Kumiko Tochiori in 1959. The novel is written as a collection of letters between the two.

== Summary ==
Shozo Murata is an elderly author who is living in Hiroshima in a historical port town that used to be part of the Kitamaebune trade route. He lives alone with only a red goldfish for a companion. One day, he receives a visit from Tochiko Orimi, a young woman from the publishing firm in Tokyo. She is substituting for the usual liaison, but at their first meeting, Murata sends her away. After she leaves the island, Murata sees a drawing of a dragon on the beach that the women drew for a boy. He decides to invite her back.

When she arrives for his manuscript, Murata asks about her life. Orimi tells him she used to perform shadow plays when she was a college student. Murata asks her to perform it for the kids on the island. Her visits become more frequent as she picks up manuscripts from Murata and entertains the kids.

Murata asks Orimi what she thinks of his previous story. After she gives her opinion, he gives her his latest manuscript. She asks him about the design of the book cover. Murata asks about the shadow pictures that Orimi uses in her play. She replies that she made them from her father's ink rubbing of a sea bream. Murata asks her to make an ink rubbing of his red goldfish. But she feels sorry for the red goldfish, because that would mean it would have to die. And that becomes a quiet issue for Tochiko, and Shozo will repent what he has done with her.

Two months later, Murata sees Orimi at a hospital. Unfortunately she has cancer, but Murata wishes for her recovery.

== Characters ==
- Shozo Murata - a 68-year-old author who lives in an island in Hiroshima. He was a popular author in Tokyo, but when he became ill ten years ago, he moved to Hiroshima, back to his home town, and writes his novels there.
- Tochiko Orimi - a 28-year-old editor working for a publishing company in Tokyo. She likes Murata's novels, and volunteered to visit him on the island to gather his manuscripts. She does not tell Murata that she has a terminal cancer.
- Yohei - a shopkeeper who owns a grocery store on the island.
- Kaori - Yohei's wife.
- Ito - Tochiko's colleague and editor

== PTV drama ==
In 2009, NHK Hiroshima developed a live-action drama based on the novel. The theme of the drama is "the brightness of the life". The story takes place in Osakishinojima Island, a fictional historical town in the Seto Inland Sea. The screenplay was written by Aya Watanabe, who had worked on House of Himiko and the live-action adaptation of the A Gentle Breeze in the Village manga. The director of the drama was Hiroshi Kurosaki, who would later direct the TV drama for Second Virgin.

The drama was filmed in Hiroshima. The Osakishinojima town scenes were filmed at Kure, and the hospital scenes were filmed at The Japanese Red Cross Hiroshima College of Nursing in Hatsukaichi.

The drama broadcast on NHK Hiroshima on July 24, 2009, and then on NHK BShi on October 14, 2009.

=== Cast ===
- Yoshio Harada as Shozo Murata
- Machiko Ono as Tochiko Orimi
- Bansuke Kasamatsu as Yohei
- Seiko Takada as Kaori
- Ryo Iwamatsu as Ito

== See also ==
- Japanese television programs
