= I Wish (film) =

- Northern American theatrical poster
- Directed by: Hirokazu Kore-eda
- Written by: Hirokazu Kore-eda
- Produced by: Kentarō Koike; Hijiri Taguchi
- Cinematography: Yutaka Yamasaki
- Edited by: Hirokazu Kore-eda
- Music by: Kishida Shigeru
- Production companies: Shirogumi Inc. BIGX
- Distributed by: Gaga
- Release date: 11 June 2011 (Japan)
- Running time: 127 minutes
- Country: Japan
- Language: Japanese
- Box office: $1,543,385

I Wish (奇跡, Kiseki; lit.Miracle) is a 2011 Japanese family drama film, edited, written, and directed by Hirokazu Kore-eda. This film stars real-life brothers Koki Maeda and Oshiro Maeda, along with veteran actress Kirin Kiki and actor Joe Odagiri.

I Wish tells the story of two young brothers who got separated and had to live in different cities – one with their father, one with their mother and her parents – and dream of reuniting.

== Cast ==
- Koki Maeda as Koichi Ohsako, the older brother
- Oshiro Maeda as Ryunosuke Kinami, the younger brother
- Nene Otsuka as Nozomi Ohsako, mother of the brothers
- Joe Odagiri as Kenji Kinami, father of the brothers
- Ryoga Hayashi as Tasuku Fukumoto, Koichi's friend
- Hosinosuke Nagayosi as Makoto Ohta, Koichi's friend
- Kyara Uchida as Megumi Ariyoshi, Ryu's friend
- Kanna Hashimoto as Kanna Hayami, Ryu's friend
- Rento Isobe as Rento Isobe, Ryu's friend
- Yuna Taira as Yuna Taira, Megumi's rival
- Yui Natsukawa as Kyouko Ariyoshi, Megumi's mother
- Hiroshi Abe as Mamoru Sakagami, a teacher at Koichi's school
- Masami Nagasawa as Sachi Mitsumura, a teacher at Koichi's school
- Kirin Kiki as Hideko Ohsako, Nozomi's mother
- Isao Hashizume as Shukichi Ohsako, Nozomi's father
- Yoshio Harada as Wataru Yamamoto, Shukichi's friend

== Production ==
Hirokazu Kore-eda started with the basic premise of the film but did not write the script until after the lead child actors had been cast, so that he could "get more ideas from them." Film Business Asia reported in October 2010 that production had begun.

== Release ==
The film was released in Japan on 11 June 2011.

== Critical response ==
On review aggregator Rotten Tomatoes, the film has an approval score of 94%, based on 77 critic reviews, with an average rating of 8/10. The site's critical consensus reads, "Elliptical and deliberately paced yet steadily absorbing, I Wish presents a beguiling portrait of childhood that grounds its sweetly nostalgic glow with well-rounded characters and attention to detail." On Metacritic, the film has an average score of 80 out of 100, based on 22 critics, indicating "generally favorable reviews".

== Soundtrack ==
The soundtrack from the film was created by the band Quruli.

Track listing on record.

1. 鹿児島おはら節 KAGOSHIMA OHARA BUSHI
2. プールとタコ焼きと市バス POOL TO TAKOYAKI TO SHI BUS
3. 龍之介と父親 RYUUNOSUKE TO CHICHIOYA
4. 学校へ行こう GAKKOU HE IKOU
5. 周吉と山本 SHUUKICHI TO YAMAMOTO
6. 中央駅にて CHUUOU EKI NITE
7. 花火だ花火だ HANABI DA HANABI DA
8. 鹿児島にて KAGOSHIMA NITE
9. ぞわぞわ ZOWAZOWA
10. それぞれの日々 SOREZORE NO HIBI
11. 軍資金のテーマ GUNSHIKIN NO THEME
12. 最終列車 SAISHUU RESSHA
13. コスモス COSMOS
14. 走れ HASHIRE
15. 願い NEGAI
16. 帰路 KIRO
17. 奇跡 KISEKI
