= Tetsuo Shinohara =

Japanese film director (born 1962)

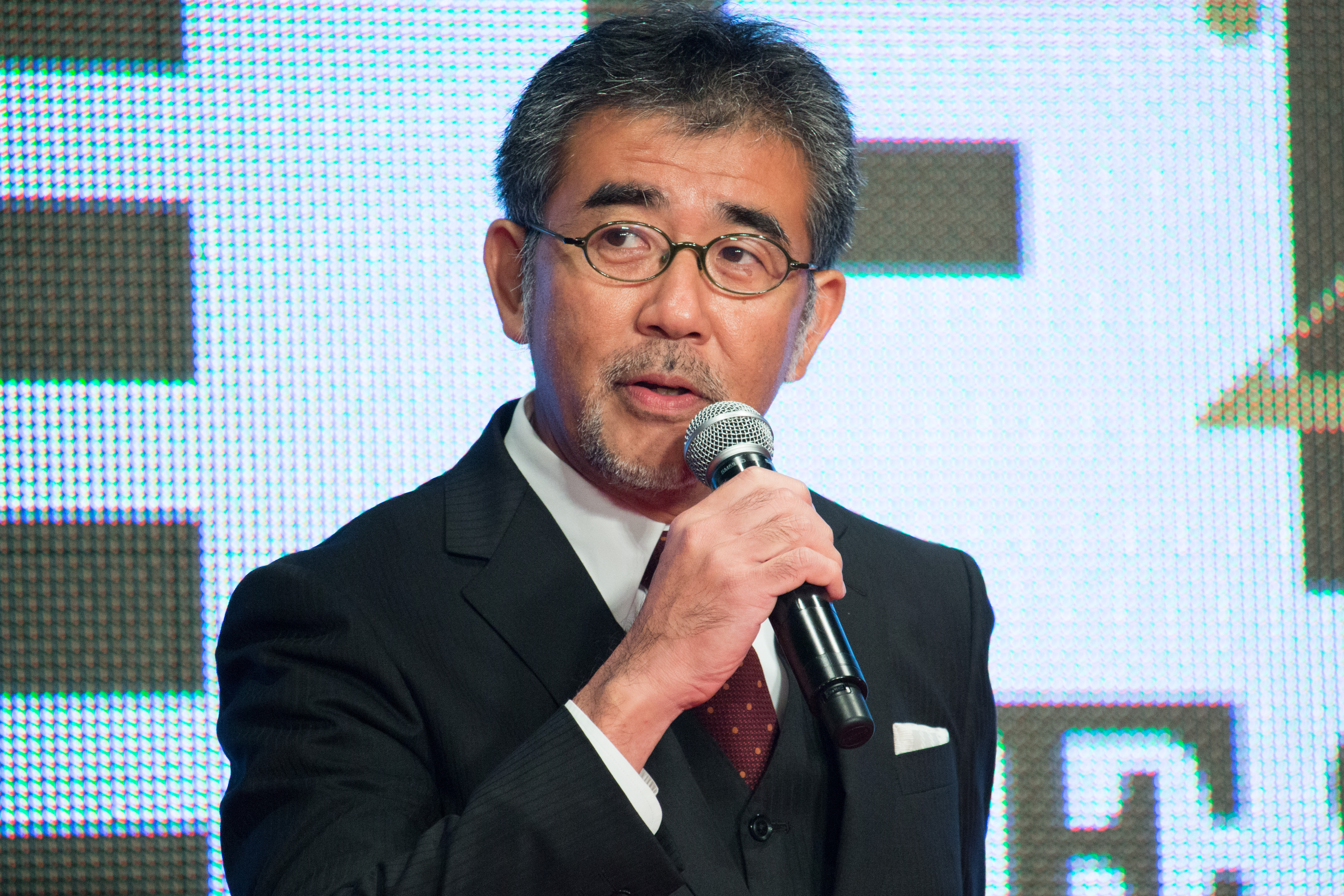
- Born: 9 February 1962 (age 64); Tokyo, Japan
- Occupation: Film director

Tetsuo Shinohara (篠原 哲雄, Shinohara Tetsuo; born 9 February 1962 in Tokyo, Japan) is a Japanese film director. His film First Love was the 3rd Best Film at the 22nd Yokohama Film Festival.

== Filmography ==
- Running High (1989)
- Work on the Grass (1993)
- One More Time, One More Chance (1996)
- Aku no hana (1997)
- Sentakuki wa ore ni makasero (1999)
- Kimi no tame ni dekiru koto (1999)
- Shisha no Gakuensai, aka School Day of the Dead, aka The Teacher (2000)
- First Love (2000)
- Stake Out (2001)
- Inochi (2002)
- High School Girl's Friend (2002)
- Mokuyo kumikyoku (2002)
- Jam Films "Kendama" (2002)
- Karaoke Terror (2003)
- Heaven's Bookstore (2004)
- Breathe In, Breathe Out (2004)
- Female (2005)
- Yokubō (2005)
- Metro ni Notte (2006)
- Clearless (2007)
- Manatsu no Orion (2009)
- Ogawa no Hotori (2011)
- Sweet Heart Chocolate (2013)
- A Sower of Seeds 2 (2015)
- Kishūteneki Terminal (2015)
- Flower and Sword (2017)
- Shadowfall (2019)
- Iyashi no Kokoromi (2020)
- Inubu: The Dog Club (2021)
- Happiness (2024)
