= Masako Bandō =

Japanese novelist (1958–2014)

Masako Bandō (坂東 眞砂子, Bandō Masako; March 30, 1958 – January 27, 2014) was a Japanese novelist.

She was awarded the prestigious Naoki Prize in 1996 for the novel Yamahaha.

== Life ==
Born in Sakawa, Takaoka District, Kōchi Prefecture, she graduated from Nara Women's University, after which she studied for a while at the Polytechnic University of Milan. After returning to Japan, she became a freelance writer.

She lived for some time in Tahiti and Lido di Venezia, and opened an Italian café in 2009 in her home province, Kōchi.

After being diagnosed with tongue cancer in 2013, she died on January 27, 2014.

== The kitten-killing incident ==
In August 2006, in two separate essays in the Nihon Keizai Shimbun, she revealed that she had killed kittens by throwing them off a cliff while living in Tahiti.

Yuriko Koike, who was Japan's minister of the environment at the time, said that "what Ms. Bandō had done was regrettable from the point of view of an animal lover".

About a month later, the Polynesian government was reported to have begun investigating it as a case of animal cruelty.

Bandō rebuked the criticism in the Mainichi Shimbun's Tokyo evening edition, saying that as long as there was no official report from the Polynesian government's side, she considered the criticism against her to be a case of suppression of freedom of speech.

== Awards ==
- 1982 The Mainichi Children's Literature Award for Newcomers
- 1994 The first Japan Horror Fiction Award
- 1996 The third Shimase Renai Literature Award
- 1996 The 116th Naoki Prize
- 2002 The 15th Shibata Renzaburō Award
