= Suzaku (film) =

- Directed by: Naomi Kawase
- Screenplay by: Naomi Kawase
- Produced by: Takenori Sentō; Kōji Kobayashi; Yasushi Tsuge
- Starring: Jun Kunimura; Machiko Ono
- Cinematography: Masaki Tamura
- Edited by: Shūichi Kakesu
- Music by: Masamichi Shigeno
- Production companies: WOWOW; Bandai Visual
- Release date: 1 November 1997
- Running time: 95 minutes
- Country: Japan
- Language: Japanese

Suzaku (Japanese: 萌の朱雀, Hepburn: Moe no Suzaku) is a Japanese fiction film from 1997 written and directed by Naomi Kawase (in her feature directorial debut).

The film follows the dissolution of a small rural Japanese family.

== Plot ==
In the mountainous Nishiyoshino region of Nara Prefecture, a small family made up of Kōzō, the father, his wife Yasuyo, grandmother Sachiko, toddler Michiru, and her male cousin, Eisuke, live peacefully together. A railway is being constructed at which the father expects to be employed. He brings his nephew and daughter to the construction site and they explore the large cavernous tunnel through which the train is expected to pass.

Fifteen years later the construction of the train has been abandoned. Michiru is now a teenage schoolgirl who has a crush on her cousin. Her mother meanwhile asks her nephew for help finding employment and he helps to secure her a position working at a small hotel where he works as a porter. Shortly after being employed there, Yasuyo faints. Afterwards, feeling depressed, Kōzō wanders off with his film camera and is later found dead by the police.

The family struggles to get along after Kōzō's death with both Michiru and her mother falling into a depression. Yasuyo eventually decides that she wants to leave the village in order to go back and live with her parents though Michiru is against the idea. Before she leaves however she confesses to Eisuke that she loves him. They spend the night on the rooftop of the house playing around.

The following day Eisuke reveals that he has the film from Kōzō's camera and the family watches scenes of different villagers and shots of nature that Kōzō took before his death.

Yasuyo and Michiru depart together and learn that Eisuke and Sachiko plan on leaving the family home as well in order to move to the hotel where Eisuke works so that he won't have to travel every day.

As Eisuke and Sachiko prepare to depart they reminisce about an earlier time when the family had been happy together.

== Cast ==
- Jun Kunimura as Kōzō Tahara
- Machiko Ono as Michiru
- Kōtarō Shibata as Eisuke
- Yasuyo Kamimura as Yasuyo
- Sachiko Izumi as Sachiko

== Production ==
Suzaku was the 35mm film debut of Kawase, who was known for her independently produced films in 8mm. A reference to her previous career can be seen in Suzaku through the 8mm film projected at the end. The only professional actor in the production was Jun Kunimura, though the film was also the debut of Machiko Ono, who later went on to have a successful acting career.

== Reception ==
Suzaku was selected for the Directors' Fortnight at the 1997 Cannes Film Festival and won the Caméra d'Or (best first film) at the Festival. It also won the FIPRESCI Award at the 1997 International Film Festival Rotterdam. Machiko Ono won the best actress award at the Singapore Film Festival for her role.

== Novelization ==
Kawase herself wrote a novelization of the film under the same title.
