= Grigory Adamov =

Soviet science fiction writer

- Born: Abram Borukhovich Gibs; May 18, 1886; Kherson, Russian Empire
- Died: June 14, 1945 (aged 59); Moscow, USSR
- Writing career
- Genre: Science Fiction

Grigory Borisovich Adamov (Russian: Григорий Борисович Адамов; born Abram Borukhovich Gibs; Абрам Борухович Гибс; May 18, 1886 - June 14, 1945) was a Soviet science fiction writer, best known for his novels Conquerors of the Underground (1937), The Mystery of the Two Oceans (1939) and The Ousting of the Ruler (1946).

== Biography ==
Abram Gibs was born in Kherson, the seventh child of a poor Jewish timber factory worker. Expelled from a local gymnasium due to his family's inability to pay for the course, he started to earn his living by giving lessons in grammar and arithmetic. His parents wanted him to become a doctor, but at the age of 15 Abram Gibs joined a radical youth circle, then the Kherson Bolshevik party organization.

In 1906 he was arrested and deported to the Arkhangelsk area, however, he soon escaped and made his way to Saint Petersburg, then, as part of a Bolshevik envoy group, travelled to Sevastopol and took part in the operation the end result of which was the destroying of documents of the battleship Potyomkin mutineers' trial. Arrested for agitation among Russian Black Sea Fleet sailors, Gibs was sentenced to three years in jail. (Note: In the post-Soviet times certain aspects of Adamov's biography, not corroborated by documental evidence, were put to doubt.)

In 1911, using the pen name Grigory Adamov, Gibs started contributing to the Kherson-based Yug (South) newspaper, of which he soon became the editor. After the 1917 Revolution Adamov joined the Narkomprod (where he became friends with future academician Otto Schmidt), then Goslitizdat publishing house, all the while writing for different journals, including Nashi Dostizhenyia (Our Achievements), edited by Mikhail Koltsov. As a correspondent for Za Industrializatsiyu (For Industrialization) newspaper Adamov travelled all over the country. It was during these voyages that he developed strong interest in science and new technology.

=== Literary career ===
In 1930 Adamov became a professional writer. His first short stories, belonging to the so-called 'close-range science fiction' genre and dealing with Solar energy and Earth power employment, artificial climate change, etc., were published by Znanie-Sila (Knowledge is Power) magazine. In 1937 Conquerors of the Underground came out. This finely written novel rich with technical trivia and with a spy thriller element to it became popular with the young, technically minded Soviet readership.

Even more successful was Adamov's second novel, The Mystery of the Two Oceans (1939), a technothriller telling the story of the Soviet wonder-submarine Pioneer, succeeding in its round-the-world mission despite imperialists' agents' attempts at thwarting it. While working upon it, Adamov became an expert in oceanography, having studied hundreds of scientific books and documents. In 1956, the novel was made into a film by Konstantin Pipinashvili at the Georgian Film Studio. While writing his third novel, The Ousting of the Ruler, he made a journey to the Russian Far North, so as to investigate his own idea of the possibility of warming the Arctic Circle area up (by artificially heating the Gulf Stream) and thus benefitting the Soviet economy. The novel was published posthumously, in 1946.

Grigory Adamov died on June 14, 1945, in Moscow.

== Select bibliography ==
- The United Columns (Соединённые колонны, Soyedinyonnye kolonny, 1931, essays and short stories collection).
- The Accident (Авария, Avariya, 1935, novelet)
- In the Stratosphere (В стратосфере, V stratosphere, 1938, short story)
- Oasis of the Sun (Оазис Солнца, Oazis Solntsa, 1936, novelet)
- Conquerors of the Underground (Победители недр, Pobediteli nedr, 1937, novel)
- The Mystery of the Two Oceans (Тайна двух океанов, Taina dvukh okeanov 1939, novel).
- The Attack of the Magnetic Torpedoes (Атака магнитных торпед, Ataka magnitnykh torped, 1938, novella)
- The Ousting of the Ruler (Изгнание владыки, Izgnaniye vladyki, 1946, novel).

=== Translations ===
- Das Geheimnis zweier Ozeane (German). Moscow, Verlag Progreß, 1948, 1962, 1966, 1978, 1980, 1982; Verlag Neues Leben, 1956, 1959.
- Pád vládce (Czech). Prague, Práce, 1950.
- Tajemství dvou oceánů (Czech). Prague, Práce, 1954.
- Taina celor doua oceane (Romanian). Bucharest. Editura Tineretului, 1957.
- Kahe ookeani saladus (Estonian). Tallinn: Eesti Riiklik Kirjastus, 1957.
- Երկու օվկիանոսների գաղտնիքը (Armenian). Yerevan, Հայպետհրատ, 1964.
