= Naomi Kawase =

Japanese filmmaker (born 1969)

- 河瀨直美
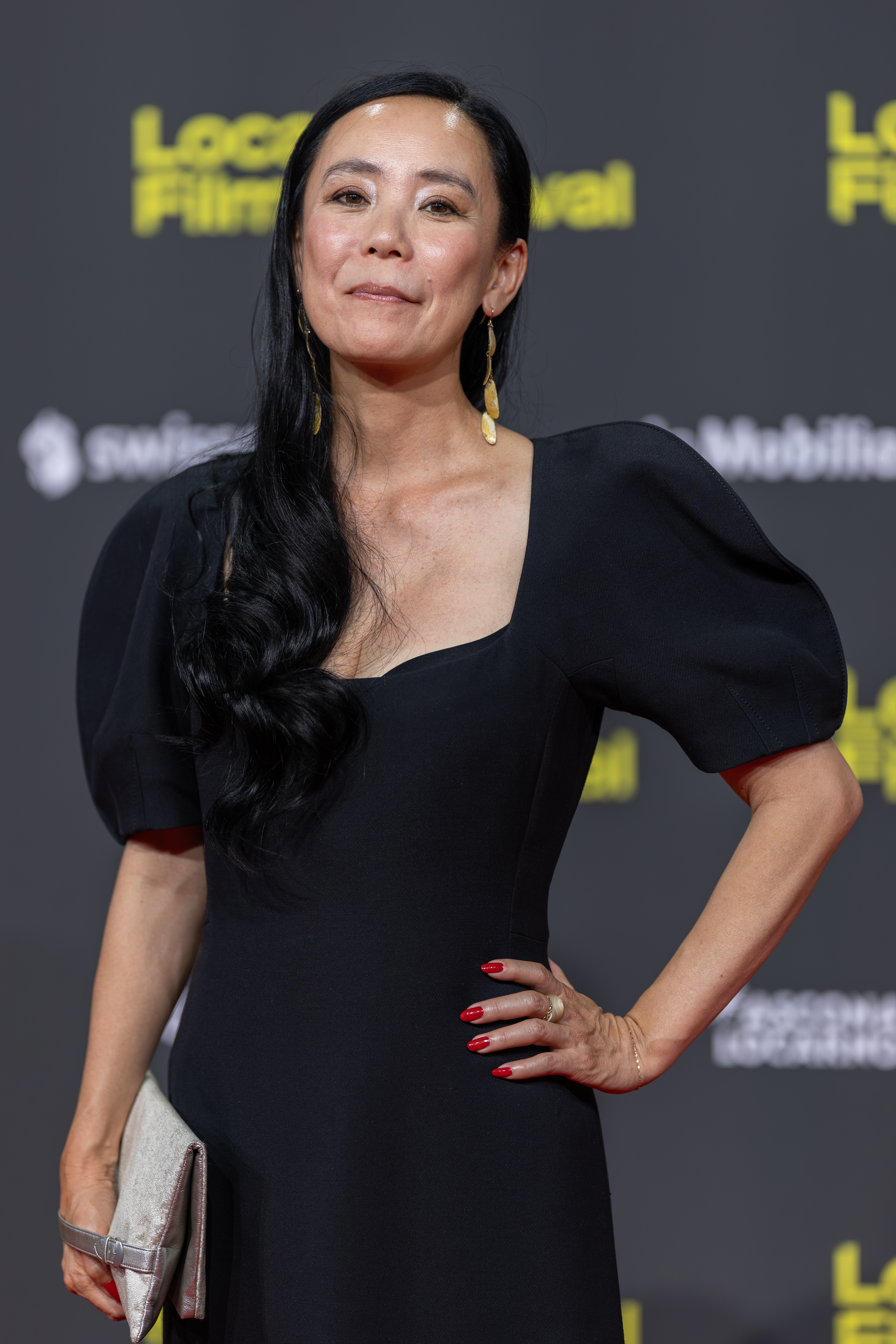
- Naomi Kawase at the 78th Locarno Film Festival in 2025
- Born: 30 May 1969 (age 57); Nara, Japan
- Other name: Naomi Sento
- Occupation: Filmmaker
- Years active: 1992–present
- Spouse: Takenori Sento (m. 1997; div. 2000)

Naomi Kawase (Japanese: 河瀨直美, romanized: Kawase Naomi; born 30 May 1969) is a Japanese film director. She was also briefly known as Naomi Sento (仙頭直美, Sentō Naomi), with her former husband's surname. Many of her works have been documentaries, including Embracing, about her search for the father who abandoned her as a child, and Katatsumori, about the grandmother who raised her.

== Early life and education ==
Growing up in the rural region of Nara, Kawase's parents split early on in her childhood, leaving her to be raised by her great-aunt, with whom she held a combative, yet loving, relationship.

She originally attended the Osaka School of Photography (大阪写真専門学校, Ōsaka Shashin Senmon Gakkō; now Visual Arts College Osaka) to study television production, but she became interested in film and decided to switch her focus. She was a student of Shunji Dodo at the college. She graduated in 1989.

== Career ==
After graduating, she spent an additional four years at the college as a lecturer before releasing Embracing. Employing her interest in autobiography, most of her first short films focus on her turbulent family history, including her abandonment and her father's death. Many of her first forays into filmmaking were autobiographical, inspired heavily by the rural landscape.

Between 1994 and 1996, she released a trilogy of films about her great-aunt: Katatsumori, See Heaven and Sun on the Horizon. She novelized her films Suzaku and Firefly.

In 2006, she released the forty-minute documentary Tarachime, which she prefers to be screened before her film from the following year. Tarachime revisits Kawase's relationship with her great-aunt, tackling very personal themes such as her aunt's growing dementia.

Kawase completed production on her fourth full-length film The Mourning Forest (Mogari no Mori), which premièred in June 2007 in her hometown Nara and went on to win the Grand Prix at the 2007 Cannes Film Festival.

Her 2011 film Hanezu premiered in competition at the 2011 Cannes Film Festival.

Pop star Hikaru Utada asked Kawase to create the music video for her 2012 single "Sakura Nagashi" (桜流し; lit. "Flowing Cherry Blossoms/Cherry Blossoms Sinking"), later to be included on Utada's 2016 album Fantôme.

In 2013 Kawase was selected as a member of the main competition jury at the 2013 Cannes Film Festival.

Her 2014 film Still the Water was selected to compete for the Palme d'Or in the main competition section at the 2014 Cannes Film Festival. Her 2015 film Sweet Bean was screened in the Un Certain Regard section at the 2015 Cannes Film Festival.

In April 2016 she was announced as the president of the jury for the Cinéfondation and short films section of the 2016 Cannes Film Festival.

On 23 October 2018, it was announced that Kawase had been selected by the IOC to shoot the official film for the 2020 Tokyo Olympics. Released in 2022, the two-part film places the 2020 Olympics within the wider context of the COVID-19 pandemic and the mixed reactions to the games from Japanese society.

== Controversies ==
On 26 December 2021, the NHK aired a documentary about the production behind Kawase's 2020 Olympics documentary. Footage and captions alleged that protesters were paid money to attend anti-Olympics demonstrations as part of larger opposition against the games. One of the men interviewed later stated he was "unsure" if he had actually attended any anti-Olympics rallies. NHK Osaka cited "editorial oversights" and "deficiencies in research", issuing an apology. They denied that the footage was deliberately fabricated to be misleading. On 13 January 2022, the NHK Osaka director Terunobu Maeda apologized during a press conference, admitting that the captions "should not have been included". Again he denied that the incident was a fabrication. On 10 February 2022 NHK Osaka announced an internal review and fired 6 production staff members.

In April 2022, Shūkan Bunshun reported that Kawase kicked a camera assistant in the stomach while filming True Mothers in May 2019, leading cinematographer Yūta Tsukinaga and his team to resign mid-production. Kawase did not deny the allegation. In May 2022, the magazine also reported that she assaulted an employee at her production company, Kumie, in October 2015. The employee was reportedly punched in the face with a closed fist and chased through the office by Kawase. Later that day the employee gathered his belongings from the office and quit. When interviewed by Shūkan Bunshun he stated, "It's true that I was punched by Kawase-san. It's something that occurred in the past and is not something I will comment about publicly."

Kawase denied both allegations and claimed the matters were handled internally.

== Styles and themes ==
Kawase's work is heavily concerned with the distorted space between fiction and non-fiction that has occurred within the state of modern Japanese society, approaching "fiction with a documentarian's gaze." She employs this documentary-realism to focus on individuals of lesser cultural status, challenging prevailing representations of women within the male-dominated Japanese film industry. This theme is also connected to her own personal reflections on contemporary issues in the current climate of economic depression such as the declining birthrate, alienation, and the collapse of traditional family structures.

She frequently shoots on location with amateur actors.

Kawase's style also invokes the autobiographical practices related to documentary style. Familiar and personal objects such as childhood photographs, and to explore her family history and identity. Her work reflects the personal, intimate, and domestic. Themes that are often associated with feminist practices and Women's Cinema.

However, Kawase does not classify herself as a feminist, as she explains:

It is extremely difficult for us to observe our own life, as it involves looking into the embarrassing or undesirable aspects of ourselves. In a way, being a woman made it easier for me to look closely at my own environment. Women tend to be more intuitive and rely more on their senses, or it might be due to gender status differences in Japan ... Not being in the mainstream or the center, she can make new discoveries. In my case, I will create things from the sources within myself. I believe that at the depth of the personal there is something universal. [Sento 1999: 47]

Kawase's films challenge cinematic conventions. Her subjects are primarily family and friends, and she frequently depicts the relationships between the filmmaker and the subject, and is self-reflexive of her own thoughts and emotions in her works.

== Awards ==
She became the youngest winner of the la Caméra d'Or award (best new director) at the 1997 Cannes Film Festival for her first 35mm film, Suzaku.

This is a list of some of her awards:

- 1997: Camera D'Or, Cannes International Film Festival: Suzaku
- 1999: Special Mention Prize, Vision du Reel: The Weald
- 2000: FIPRESCI Prize: Hotaru
- 2000: CICAE Prize: Hotaru
- 2000: Best Achievement Award in Cinematography and Directing, Buenos Aires International Film Festival: Hotaru
- 2007: Special Prize, Yamagata International Film Festival: Tarachime
- 2007: Grand Prix, Cannes International Film Festival: The Mourning Forest
- 2015: Chevalier Ordre des Arts et des Lettres of France
- 2017: Ecumenical Jury Prize, Cannes International Film Festival: Radiance
- 2021: Mainichi Film Award for Best Director: True Mothers

== Filmography ==
Kawase's work was originally produced in various media: 8mm film, 16mm film, 35mm film, and video.

- I focus on that which interests me (1988, 5 min)
- The concretization of these things flying around me (1988, 5 min)
- My J-W-F (1988, 10 min)
- Papa's Icecream (1988, 5 min)
- My Solo Family (1989, 10 min)
- Presently (1989, 5 min)
- A Small Largeness (1989, 10 min)
- The Girl's Daily Bread (1990, 10 min)
- Like Happiness (1991, 20 min)
- Embracing (につつまれて; 1992, 40 min)
- White Moon (1993, 55 min)
- Katatsumori (かたつもり; 1994, 40 min)
- See Heaven (天、見たけ; 1995, 10 min)
- Memory of the Wind (1995, 30 min)
- This World (1996, 8 min)
- Sun on the Horizon (陽は傾ぶき; 1996, 45 min)
- Suzaku (萌の朱雀; 1997, 95 min)
- The Weald (杣人物語; 1997, 73 min)
- Kaleidoscope (Mangekyō) (1999, 81 min)
- Firefly (Hotaru) (2000, 164 min)
- Sky, Wind, Fire, Water, Earth (きゃからばあ) (2001, 55 min)
- Letter from a Yellow Cherry Blossom (Tsuioku no dansu) (2003, 65 min)
- Shara (Sharasōju) (2003, 100 min)
- Kage (Shadow) (2006, 26 min)
- Tarachime (2006, 43 min)
- The Mourning Forest (Mogari No Mori) (2007, 97 min)
- Nanayomachi 「七夜待」(2008)
- In Between Days (2009)
- Visitors (2009) (segment "Koma")
- Genpin (2010)
- Hanezu (2011)
- 60 Seconds of Solitude in Year Zero (2011)
- Chiri (2012)
- Still the Water (2014)
- Sweet Bean (2015)
- Radiance (2017)
- Vision (2018)
- True Mothers (2020)
- Tokyo 2020 Official Film (2022)
- Yakushima's Illusion (2025)
- Echoes of Motherhood (2025)
