= Ichi (film) =

- Theatrical release poster
- Directed by: Fumihiko Sori
- Screenplay by: Taeko Asano
- Story by: Zatoichi by Kan Shimozawa
- Produced by: Nobuhiro Azuma; Koji Yoshida; Yasushi Umemura
- Starring: Haruka Ayase; Takao Osawa; Shido Nakamura; Yosuke Kubozuka
- Cinematography: Keiji Hashimoto
- Edited by: Mototaka Kusakabe
- Music by: Lisa Gerrard; Michael Edwards
- Production companies: Tokyo Broadcasting System; Geneon Entertainment; Sedic International; Warner Bros. Pictures; Dentsu; Lawson Ticket; Kodansha; Mainichi Broadcasting System; Horipro; Asahi Shimbun; Oxybot
- Distributed by: Warner Bros. Pictures
- Release date: October 25, 2008
- Running time: 120 minutes
- Country: Japan
- Language: Japanese

Ichi is a 2008 chanbara (チャンバラ) film directed by Fumihiko Sori, starring Haruka Ayase, Takao Osawa, Shido Nakamura, and Yosuke Kubozuka. It was released by Warner Bros. Japan on October 25, 2008.

The film was loosely based on the manga by Hana Shinohara published Oct 23, 2008, to Aug 23, 2011. It is also a soft reboot of the Zatoichi film series, featuring a female protagonist this time named Ichi, a blind musician and samurai traveling Feudal Japan to find her lost mentor (who is actually Zatoichi himself).

== Plot ==
Ichi (市) is a goze (blind woman) who is travelling Japan in search of her mentor, who was the actual Zatoichi.

She is befriended by a traveling samurai Toma Fujihira, who tells her that he rescued her from bandits (in fact, it was Ichi who saved them both by killing the bandits). They travel to a town run by the Shirakawa, a Yakuza family who are plagued by the Banki-to, a group of mercenaries. This group is led by Banki, an evil man who is excellent in sword fighting but has a disfigured face. Ichi is befriended by Kotaro, a boy who lives with his drunkard father.

After Ichi helps Toma win money from Chō-han, they are followed by five Bankito who demand Toma's money. After Toma refuses, he is challenged to a fight but is unable to draw his sword. Ichi slays the gang. The Shirakawa leader's son, Toraji, arrives after the fight and assumes that it was Toma who slew the men and makes Toma his personal bodyguard. Ichi is convinced by Kotaro and his father to stay in the hope of the famed blind swordmaster, Zatoichi, passing through. Toma confesses that although he has fighting skills he is unable to draw his sword because of guilt for blinding his mother in an accident.

The Bankito plan their revenge. They kill the head of the Shirakawa. Toma is unable to defend anyone and is left unconscious. Ichi admits that it was she who killed the earlier men and after displaying her skills, the second-in-command of the Bankito is convinced and takes her to the mountains to meet their leader, Banki. After she kills two Bankito who doubted her skills, Banki attacks and defeats her. As Ichi lies injured, Banki states that he has met her mentor. The two had fought but Zatoichi would die in battle because of a fast-acting disease. She is thrown into a locked ditch and left to die. As she loses consciousness, Ichi drops the bell given to her by Zatoichi.

We then see Ichi's backstory. She was born blind. While she was still a young girl, Zatoichi rescued her and left her in the care of a group of goze, giving Ichi a small bell to remember him by. Zatoichi visited her as she grew and secretly taught her the fighting techniques he had mastered. Ichi grew up to be a musically talented and beautiful woman, as well as an accomplished sword-fighter. After one of her goze group's performances, she was raped by one of the patrons. Goze were strictly forbidden to marry and required to be celibate so she was later expelled from the goze household, even though it broke the other members' hearts. She pleaded with the man who had raped her to talk to the leader of the goze so she could go back to the group, but instead he mocked her and tried to attack her again. She was able to draw the sword she kept hidden in her cane and killed him. Ichi then travelled Japan to look for Zatoichi, who she believed was her father, and this was how she met Toma.

Toma is attacked by the members of the Yakuza clan because of his deceit, but Toraji rebukes the attackers, stating that they still need Toma's help to defeat the Bankito. Toma goes with Kotaro's reformed father to the Bankito hideout and saves Ichi. Banki swore revenge. While recovering, Ichi explained that she is searching for Zatoichi because she wanted to see him one last time before she commits suicide. Toma is able to convince her to give up the idea. Later, while she sleeps recovering from her injuries, Toma leaves her to go help the Shirakawa fight the Bankito. When Ichi wakes up Kotaro tells her about the fight that's going on in the town.

The Bankito outnumber the Shirakawa by 2 to 1. Still, Toma is unable to draw his sword. But when Banki demands Toma step forward and fight him, Toma is willing. He overcomes his guilt and is able to draw his sword. The two men fight and Toma shows everyone that he is indeed an adept swordsman. Toma inflicts a fatal strike on Banki, but Banki gives him a fatal wound as well. Toma dies in Ichi's arms and tells her not to lose hope. After Toma dies Banki tries to attack Ichi but she is able to defeat him and finally kills the clan leader, whose horribly scarred face is revealed. Fearing for their lives, the few remaining members of the Bankito flee.

Later we see Toraji rebuilding his town and assuming the leadership of his Yakuza clan. Ichi plays Toma's favorite song one last time and is seen at his grave with Kotaro. Intending to bring Toma's katana to his mother's grave, she bids her friend Kotaro farewell and gives him a little bell as a keepsake (the same gift that Zatoichi had given her when she was young). She said that Kotaro was right all along, that she needed light for her journey, and then departs.

== Cast ==
- Haruka Ayase as Ichi
- Shido Nakamura as Banki
- Yosuke Kubozuka as Toraji Shirakawa
- Takao Osawa as Toma Fujihira
- Tetta Sugimoto as Zatoichi
- Megumi Yokoyama as Toma's mother
- Eri Watanabe as Ohama
- Mitsuki Koga as Jakou
- Ryousuke Shima as Kotaro
- Yukina Kashiwa as Ichi, as a girl

== Reception ==
The film received generally positive reviews, with a 78% rating on Rotten Tomatoes. Jessica Sattell of Ibuki Magazine said "Beauty is found at every turn in this bewitching tale", while James Mudge of BeyondHollywood.com found the plot 'very basic and predictable'.
