= Kosaka =

Kosaka (小坂, 小阪 or 古坂) and Kōsaka (高坂 or 向坂; also spelled Kousaka) are two separate Japanese surnames, distinguished by the length of the vowel in the first syllable of each surname. They are sometimes spelled identically in romanisation due to omission of the macron in the latter surname. Notable people with these surnames include:

- Daimaou Kosaka (古坂 大魔王), comedian
- Kenji Kosaka (politician) (小坂 憲次), politician
- Kitarō Kōsaka (高坂 希太郎), animator and film director
- Makoto Kosaka (小坂 誠), professional baseball player
- Nao Kosaka (小坂菜緒), idol, model, actress and member of the Japanese girls idol group Hinatazaka46
- Kōsaka Masanobu (高坂 昌信), samurai warrior
- Riyu Kosaka (小坂 りゆ), member of the Konami-produced J-Pop group BeForU
- Tadahiro Kosaka (小坂 忠広), race walker
- Yuka Kosaka (小阪 由佳), gravure idol
- Zentaro Kosaka (小坂 善太郎), politician

Fictional characters:

- Chihiro Kosaka (小阪 ちひろ), a character from The World God Only Knows
- Honoka Kōsaka (高坂 穂乃果), a character from Love Live!
- Kirino Kōsaka (高坂 桐乃), a character from Oreimo
- Tamaki Kōsaka (向坂 環), a character from To Heart 2
- Reina Kousaka (高坂 麗奈), a character from Sound! Euphonium

== See also ==
- Kosaka, Akita (小坂町), town located in Kazuno District, Akita Prefecture, Japan
