= 2002 in Japan =

- Decades: 1980s; 1990s; 2000s; 2010s; 2020s
- See also: Other events of 2002; History of Japan • Timeline • Years

Events in the year 2002 in Japan.

== Incumbents ==
- Emperor: Akihito
- Prime Minister: Junichiro Koizumi (L–Kanagawa)
- Chief Cabinet Secretary: Yasuo Fukuda (L–Gunma)
- Chief Justice of the Supreme Court: Shigeru Yamaguchi until October 30, Akira Machida from November 6
- President of the House of Representatives: Tamisuke Watanuki (L–Toyama)
- President of the House of Councillors: Yutaka Inoue (L–Chiba) until April 22, Hiroyuki Kurata (L–Chiba)
- Diet sessions: 154th (regular, January 21 to July 31), 155th (extraordinary, October 18 to December 13)

=== Governors ===
- Aichi Prefecture: Masaaki Kanda
- Akita Prefecture: Sukeshiro Terata
- Aomori Prefecture: Morio Kimura
- Chiba Prefecture: Akiko Dōmoto
- Ehime Prefecture: Moriyuki Kato
- Fukui Prefecture: Yukio Kurita
- Fukuoka Prefecture: Wataru Asō
- Fukushima Prefecture: Eisaku Satō
- Gifu Prefecture: Taku Kajiwara
- Gunma Prefecture: Hiroyuki Kodera
- Hiroshima Prefecture: Yūzan Fujita
- Hokkaido: Tatsuya Hori
- Hyogo Prefecture: Toshizō Ido
- Ibaraki Prefecture: Masaru Hashimoto
- Ishikawa Prefecture: Masanori Tanimoto
- Iwate Prefecture: Hiroya Masuda
- Kagawa Prefecture: Takeki Manabe
- Kagoshima Prefecture: Tatsurō Suga
- Kanagawa Prefecture: Hiroshi Okazaki
- Kochi Prefecture: Daijiro Hashimoto
- Kumamoto Prefecture: Yoshiko Shiotani
- Kyoto Prefecture: Teiichi Aramaki (until 15 April) Keiji Yamada (starting 16 April)
- Mie Prefecture: Masayasu Kitagawa
- Miyagi Prefecture: Shirō Asano
- Miyazaki Prefecture: Suketaka Matsukata
- Nagano Prefecture:
  - starting 15 July: Yasuo Tanaka
  - 16 July-5 September: Shuichi Abe
  - starting 5 September: Yasuo Tanaka
- Nagasaki Prefecture: Genjirō Kaneko
- Nara Prefecture: Yoshiya Kakimoto
- Niigata Prefecture: Ikuo Hirayama
- Oita Prefecture: Morihiko Hiramatsu
- Okayama Prefecture: Masahiro Ishii
- Okinawa Prefecture: Keiichi Inamine
- Osaka Prefecture: Fusae Ōta
- Saga Prefecture: Isamu Imoto
- Saitama Prefecture: Yoshihiko Tsuchiya
- Shiga Prefecture: Yoshitsugu Kunimatsu
- Shiname Prefecture: Nobuyoshi Sumita
- Shizuoka Prefecture: Yoshinobu Ishikawa
- Tochigi Prefecture: Akio Fukuda
- Tokushima Prefecture: Toshio Endo (until 27 April); Tadashi Ōta (starting 28 April)
- Tokyo: Shintarō Ishihara
- Tottori Prefecture: Yoshihiro Katayama
- Toyama Prefecture: Yutaka Nakaoki
- Wakayama Prefecture: Yoshiki Kimura
- Yamagata Prefecture: Kazuo Takahashi
- Yamaguchi Prefecture: Sekinari Nii
- Yamanashi Prefecture: Ken Amano

== Events ==
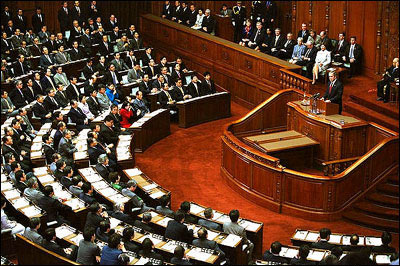
George W. Bush addressing a joint session of the Diet, February 19

=== January ===
- January 15: UFJ Bank founded via the merger of the Sanwa Bank, Ltd., the Tokai Bank, Ltd. and Toyo Trust and Banking Co., Ltd.
- January 29: Prime Minister Koizumi fires Foreign Minister Makiko Tanaka.

=== February ===
- February 1: Yoriko Kawaguchi is appointed foreign minister; her previous portfolio of Environment Minister is assumed by Hiroshi Oki.
- February 19: U.S. president George W. Bush addresses a joint session of the Diet.

=== March ===
- March 7: Futoshi Matsunaga and Junko Ogata are arrested for confinement of a 17-year-old girl. They are arrested for seven murders later.

=== April ===
- April 1: Mizuho Bank founded.
- April 1: Domestic Violence Prevention Act becomes effective.
- April 21
  - E231 series trains are introduced on the Yamanote Line in Tokyo.
  - Koizumi visits Yasukuni Shrine.
- April 22: The new official residence of the Prime Minister opens next to the old one in Nagatachō, Tokyo.

=== May ===
- May 31: The World Cup Korea/Japan 2002 begins.

=== June ===
- June 11: Solar eclipse visible throughout Japan.
- June 24: Chiyoda ward in Tokyo bans smoking while walking in public.
- June 30
  - The World Cup ends.
  - Izumi Garden Tower is completed.

=== August ===
- August 30: The last Mazda 626 rolls off the production line after 23 years. Its successor, the 6, enters production on October 1.

=== September ===
- September 17: Koizumi visits North Korea; Kim Jong-il admits to the North Korean abduction of Japanese citizens.

=== October ===
- October 15: Five Japanese abductees return from North Korea.
- October 25: Opposition politician Kōki Ishii was assassinated outside his home in Tokyo.

=== November ===
- November 1 – Renesas Technology, as predecessor of Renesas Electronics was founded.

=== December ===
- December 1
  - Tōhoku Shinkansen extension to Hachinohe Station opens.
  - Saikyo Line and Rinkai Line extensions to Osaki Station open, allowing through service.
  - Iwate Ginga Line and Aoimori Railway begin operations.

== The Nobel Prize ==
- Masatoshi Koshiba: 2002 Nobel Prize in Physics winner.
- Koichi Tanaka: 2002 Nobel Prize in Chemistry winner.

== Births ==
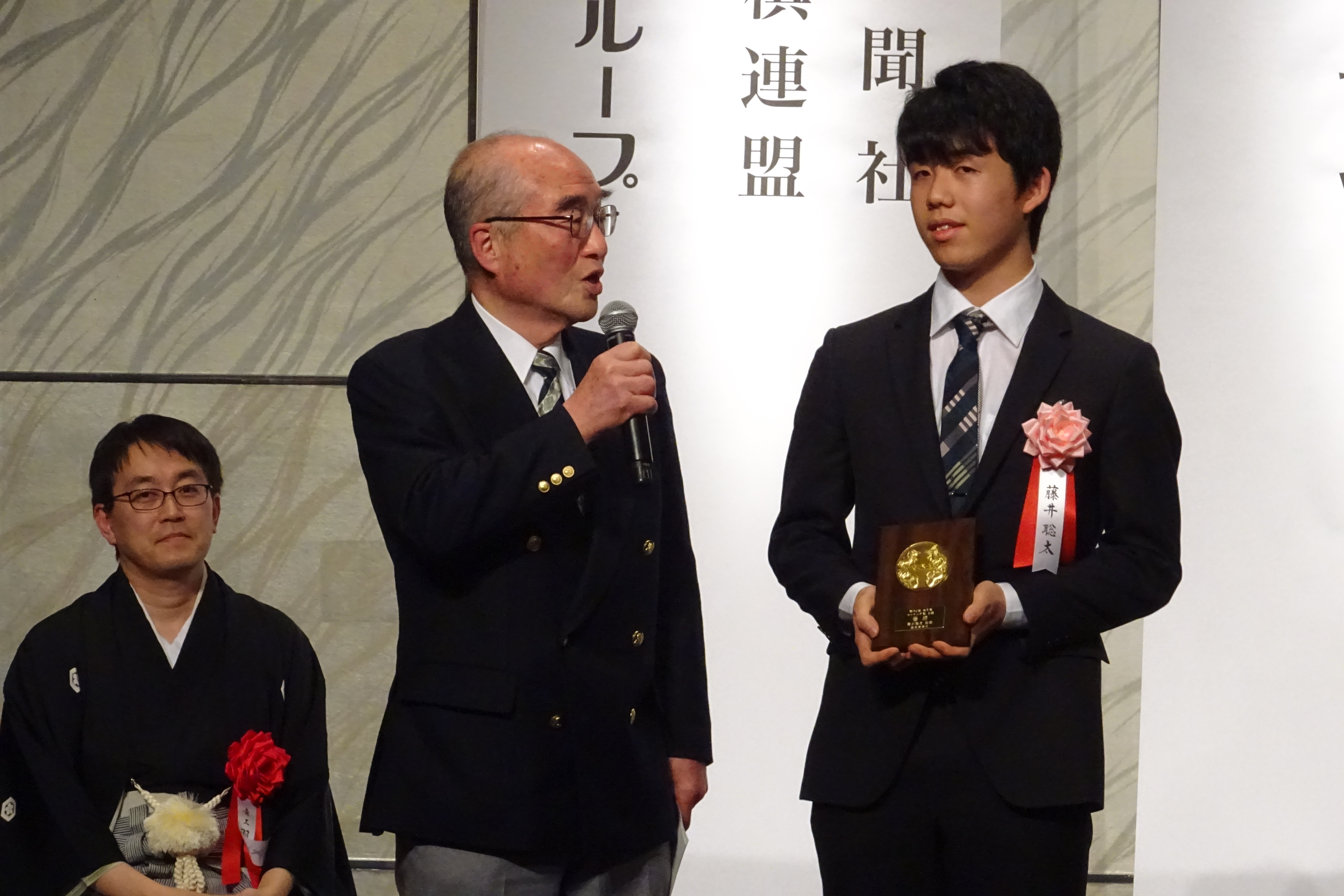
Sota Fujii, a current successful shogi player (right)

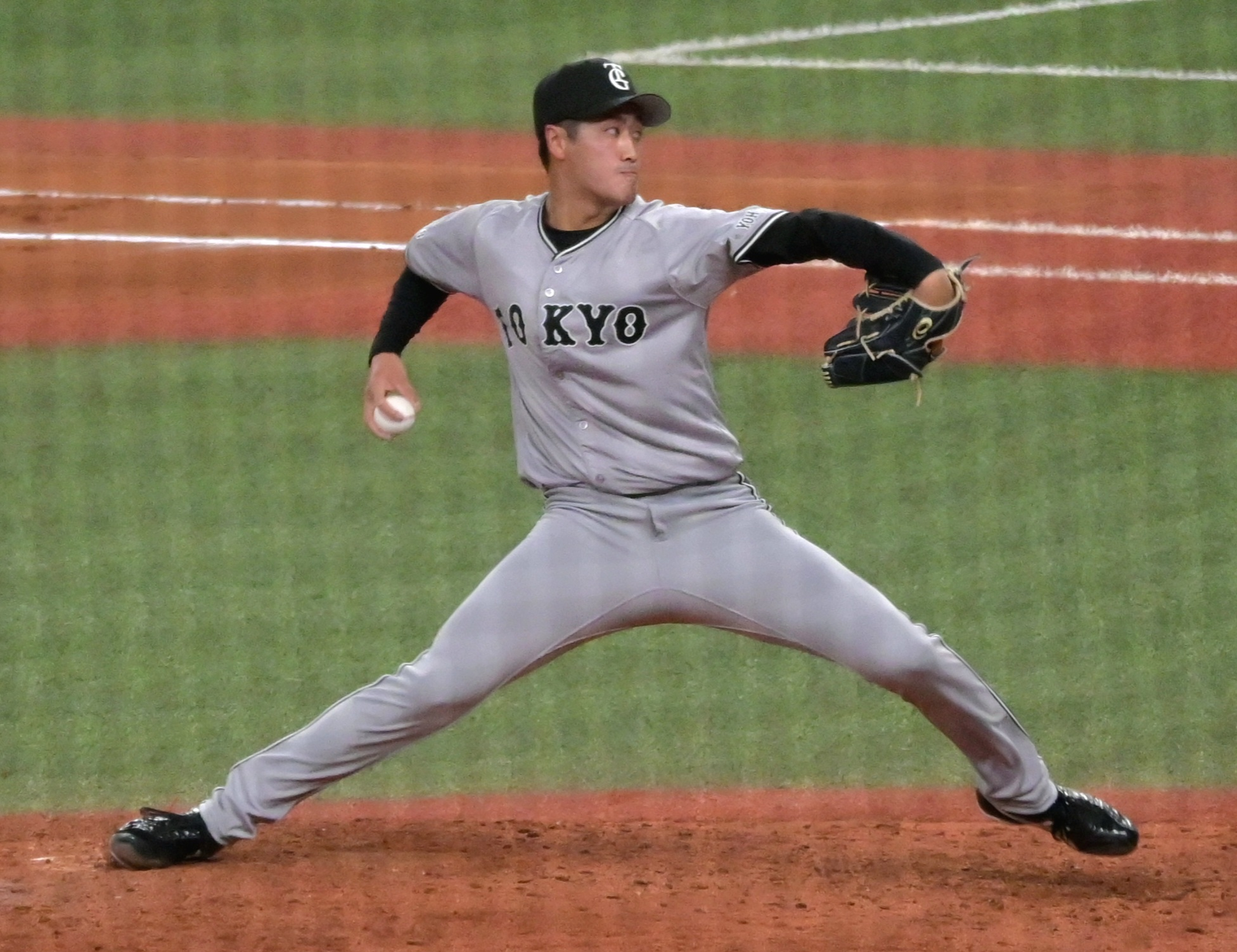
Yuhi Nishidate of Tokyo Yomiuri Giants relief pitcher

- March 11: Yūhi Nishidate, pfofessional baseball pitcher
- March 25: Rio Sasaki, child actress
- April 2: Yuito Obara, actor
- July 14: Kosei Fujita, professional wrestler
- July 19: Sōta Fujii, professional shōgi player
- July 21: Rika Kihira, figure skater
- September 7: Nao Kosaka, idol, model, actress and member of the Japanese girls idol group Hinatazaka46
- December 20: Yuuna Sugiyama, actress and singer

== Deaths ==
- March 8: Sanji Hase, voice actor
- April 10: Yuji Hyakutake, amateur astronomer
- May 13: Morihiro Saito, aikidoka
- May 16: Shoichi Arai, professional wrestling promoter
- May 24: Toshihito Ito, actor
- May 25: Genichi Kawakami, president of Yamaha Corporation from 1950 to 1977
- June 13: Hideo Murata, rōkyoku and enka singer
- June 15: Hideo Murota, actor
- September 12: Mitsuo Ikeda, wrestler
- October 12: Nozomi Momoi, AV idol
- October 25: Kōki Ishii, politician (b.1940)
- November 15: Sohn Kee-chung, marathon runner
- December 15: Mr. C.B., thoroughbred racehorse
- December 21: Prince Takamado
- December 28: Koreyoshi Kurahara, screenwriter and director

== See also ==
- 2002 in Japanese television
- List of Japanese films of 2002
