= Kurumi Mamiya =

Japanese voice actress (born November 10)

- 間宮 くるみ
- Born: Kurumi Mamiya (間宮くるみ); November 10; Yasu Town, Yasu District, Shiga Prefecture, Japan
- Occupation: Voice actress
- Years active: 1990–present
- Agent: 81 Produce
- Notable work: Trotting Hamtaro as Hamtaro; Inai Inai Baa! as U-tan; One Piece as Leo

Kurumi Mamiya (間宮 くるみ, Mamiya Kurumi; born November 10) is a Japanese voice actress affiliated with 81 Produce.

She is most famously known for her role as the titular character of the Trotting Hamtaro television anime series.

Other notable voice roles of hers are as U-tan in Inai Inai Baa! and Leo in One Piece.

== Biography ==
In her elementary school graduation yearbook, she wrote down that her dream was to become a voice actor, but in part to her introverted personality, that glamorous dream was gradually pushed to the back of her mind around junior high school. After graduating from Shiga Prefectural Yasu High School, she moved from Shiga to Tokyo and enrolled in a vocational school. Two years then passed, she lived day by day without any particular goal, and just as she started to think, "Should I go back to Yasu?," she then found herself asking, "What on earth do I really want to do?" and "Is this really how I want to live my one and only life?" She then set her mind at that moment to "challenge the dream I had put away," and enrolled in the Baobab Academy, now known as the Visual Space Actor Training Institute, as a 9th-generation student. She wound up studying acting and methods of expression for four years.

In her third year after graduating the institute, Mamiya was officially selected to voice the titular character, Hamtaro, in the Trotting Hamtaro television anime series. According to a 2003 interview, she felt a sense of fulfillment when children told her, "Even when I'm feeling down, hearing Hamtaro's voice cheers me up."

She was formerly affiliated with Production Baobab until transferring to 81 Produce on April 1, 2004.

== Personality ==
Her vocal range is soprano and she speaks in the Kansai dialect.

Her hobbies and special skills include playing badminton, performing impersonations, playing the ukulele, and watching movies.

She had felt a complex about her own voice for a long time, as in junior high school, people around her would say things like "you're so strange" or "that's weird", making her want to overcome and gain confidence in herself. After debuting as a voice actress, she stated, "This voice is something only I can produce—it's my own uniqueness."

As a voice actress, she is mainly active in television animation and foreign film dubbing.

== Filmography ==
=== Television animation ===
List of voice performances in television animation
Year	Title	Role	Notes	Source
1997	Tokyo Pig	Tamae Hatakeyama (Tama-chan)	Main role	
1997	Crayon Shin-chan	Tsuyoshi, Burīfu Panda, Chidejin		
1997	Those Who Hunt Elves 2	Female Student	Ep. 6	
1998	Takoyaki Mantoman	Tenten	Main role	
1998	DT Eightron	Child	Ep. 8	
1998	Bomberman B-Daman Bakugaiden	Juni Bomber	Ep. 33	
1998	Dokkiri Doctor	Kaori Tajima, The Phantom Girl Singer, Hanako	Main role; Phantom in Ep. 5, Hanako in Ep. 24	
1999	Bomberman B-Daman Bakugaiden V	Chibigon	Debuts in Ep. 2	
1999	Aesop's World	Picco	Main role	
1999	Kyoro-chan	Mikken, Tanaka's dog, Customer A	Main role; Tanaka's dog in Ep. 36	
1999	Nekojiru Gekijō	Ponkichi	Debuts in Ep. 11	
1999	Guru Guru Town Hanamaru-kun	Maruru	Lead role	
2000	Rerere no Tensai Bakabon	Penguin Lion, Snake Cobter, Hatabo Mouse, Shiro Unagi-Inu, Police Officer, Vacuum Cleaner Child, Enviable Child	Penguin Lion and Snake Cobter in Ep. 15, Hatabo Mouse in Ep. 16, Shiro Unagi-Inu in Eps 16, 19, 21-23, Police Officer in Ep. 19, Vacuum Cleaner Child in Ep. 23, Enviable Child in Ep. 24	
2000	Taro the Space Alien	Yūji	Main role	
2000	Trotting Hamtaro	Hamtaro	Lead role	
2000	Ghost Stories	Keiichiro Miyanoshita	Main role	
2001	Cosmic Baton Girl Comet-san	Tsuyoshi Fujiyoshi	Main role	
2001	Prétear - The New Legend of Snow White	C-ko	Ep. 1	
2001	Magical Meow Meow Taruto	Cookie, Manju		
2001	Dotto! Koni-chan	Tomoe Shinohara		
2001	Piroppo	Funira, Kimaru		
2002	A Little Snow Fairy Sugar	Lancelot the Turtle	Debuts in Ep. 14	
2002	Wagamama Fairy: Mirumo de Pon!	Komugi, Pappi	Komugi in Ep. 21, Pappi Debuts in Ep. 32	
2002	Atashin'chi	Fujino's Younger Brother, Child, Announcer		
2002	Doraemon	Cha-Cha, Yūki-kun	Cha-cha in Ep. 1678, Yūki-kun in Ep. 1725	
2002	Gravion	Anya		
2002	Tokyo Mew Mew	Momoka	Ep. 35	

- Takopi's Original Sin (Takopi)
- Glass Mask (TV) as Kazu (Ep. 16)
- Jigoku Shoujo Futakomori as Nene Chiwaki (Ep. 17)
- One Piece as Leo
- Sgt. Frog as Nuii of Shurara Corps (Ep. 188)
- Yakitate!! Japan as Little Girl (Ep. 63)
- Zoids: Genesis as Ra Muu (Eps 16-17)
- Otogizōshi as Brother (Ep. 16)
- Assassination Classroom (Kunudon)
- Battle B-Daman (Bull Borgnine)
- Gravion Zwei (Anya)
- Inai Inai Baa! (U-tan)
- Ice (Satsuki)
- Les Misérables: Shōjo Cosette (Azelma)
- Magical Girl Raising Project (Fav)
- Mirmo de Pon! (Pappi)
- Ouran High School Host Club (Kirimi Nekozawa)
- Pokémon Mystery Dungeon: Explorers of Time and Explorers of Darkness (Pochama)
- Puyo Puyo~n (Carbuncle)
- Shugo Chara! (Hinamori Ami)
- Shugo Chara!! Doki- (Hinamori Ami)

=== Theatrical animation ===
List of voice performances in theatrical animation
Year	Title	Role	Notes	Source
2000	Escaflowne	Hitomi Kanzaki (child)		
2001	Trotting Hamtaro: Adventures in Ham-Ham Land	Hamtaro	Lead role	
2002	The War of the Girl	Link		
2002	6 Angels	Rynk		
2002	Trotting Hamtaro: The Captive Princess	Hamtaro	Lead role	
2003	My Sister Momoko	Momoko Kuramoto		
2003	Trotting Hamtaro: Miracle in Aurora Valley	Hamtaro	Lead role	
2004	Trotting Hamtaro: The Mysterious Oni Picture Book Tower	Hamtaro	Lead role	
2006	Origin: Spirits of the Past	Bērui		
2007	Tamagotchi: The Movie	Ms. Perfect		
2008	Crayon Shin-chan: Fierceness That Invites Storm! The Hero of Kinpoko	Gingin (Kuro)		
2010	Pokémon—Zoroark: Master of Illusions	Zorua	Main role	
2014	Go Go Yuto the Movie	Chicho	Main role	
2025	Dream Animals: The Movie	Chick		
2026	Takopi's Original Sin: Thank You, See You Tomorrow	Takopi	Compilation film	

=== Original video animation (OVA) ===
List of voice performances in original video animation
Year	Title	Role	Notes	Source
1996	Alice in Cyberland	Female		
2000	éX-Driver	Make		
2001	Hello Kitty's Momotarō	Baby Goat		
2001	Pompompurin's The Hare and the Tortoise	Tortoise	Lead role	
2001	Trotting Hamtaro: 3000 Hammy Steps In Search Of Mommy	Hamtaro	Lead role	
2002	Trotting Hamtaro: Ham-Hams Ahoy!	Hamtaro	Lead role	
2003	Ano Yama ni Noborou Yo	Yūki		
2003	Trotting Hamtaro: Rainbow Rescue	Hamtaro	Lead role	
2004	Jing, King of Bandits: Seventh Heaven	Clove	Ep. 2	
2004	Trotting Hamtaro: Ham-Ham Games	Hamtaro	Lead role	
2007	Ice	Satsuki	Main role	
2009	Unusual Adventures -Taro and His Fun-Loving Friends-	Yaoi, Neko		
2025	Dream Animals THE MOVIE Short Clips	Chick	Main role	

=== Video games ===
- Kirby and the Forgotten Land as Elfilin
- Touhou Gensou Eclipse (Cirno)

=== Dubbing ===
==== Animation ====
- The Powerpuff Girls as Bubbles (Japanese UG dub)
- Recess as Cornchip Girl and Guru Kid

=== Drama CD ===
- Hayate × Blade as Hayate Kurogane

Unknown date
