= List of Japanese films of 2002 =

The following is a list of Japanese films distributed in 2002.

== Highest-grossing films ==
Rank	Title	Gross	Ref.
1	The Cat Returns / Ghiblies Episode 2	¥6.48 billion	
2	Case Closed: The Phantom of Baker Street	¥3.4 billion	
3	Godzilla, Mothra and King Ghidorah: Giant Monsters All-Out Attack / Hamtaro: Adventures in Ham-Ham Land	¥2.71 billion	
4	Pokémon Heroes / Camp Pikachu	¥2.67 billion	
5	Doraemon: Nobita in the Robot Kingdom / The Day When I Was Born / Goal! Goal! Goal!!	¥2.31 billion	
6	Sennen no Koi Story of Genji	¥2.08 billion	
7	Chopper's Kingdom on the Island of Strange Animals / Digimon Tamers: Runaway Locomon / Dream Soccer King!	¥2 billion	
8	Copycat Killer	¥1.61 billion	
9	Inuyasha the Movie: Affections Touching Across Time	¥1.54 billion	
10	Leave It to the Nurses	¥1.44 billion	

== List of films ==
A list of films released in Japan in 2002 (see 2002 in film).

Title	Director	Cast	Genre	Notes
6 Angels	Makoto Kobayashi			
Alive	Ryuhei Kitamura	Hideo Sakaki, Tak Sakaguchi	Horror	
The Cat Returns	Hiroyuki Morita		Fantasy, Anime	
Crayon Shin-chan: The Battle of the Warring States				
Dark Water	Hideo Nakata		Horror	
Dead or Alive: Final	Takashi Miike	Riki Takeuchi, Show Aikawa	Action, Science fiction	
Detective Conan: The Phantom of Baker Street				
Dolls	Takeshi Kitano	Miho Kanno, Hidetoshi Nishijima	Drama	
Doing Time	Yoichi Sai	Tsutomu Yamazaki, Teruyuki Kagawa	Drama	
Doraemon: Nobita and the Robot Kingdom	Tsutomu Shibayama	Nobuyo Ōyama, Nobita Nobi, Michiko Nomura, Kaneta Kimotsuki, Kazuya Tatekabe	Anime	26th film in the Doraemon film series.
Godzilla Against Mechagodzilla	Masaaki Tezuka		Kaiju	
Harmful Insect	Akihiko Shiota	Aoi Miyazaki, Seiichi Tanabe	Drama	
Hurricanger Movie				
Hurricanger vs. Gaoranger				
Hustler	Joel Apuyan	Jacky Woo, Jo Canonizado, John Apacible, Via Veloso, Ricardo Cepeda	Action, Sport	Filipino-Japanese co-production
Inuyasha the Movie: The Castle Beyond the Looking Glass		Kappei Yamaguchi, Satsuki Yukino	Fantasy anime	
Kamen Rider Ryuki: Episode Final				
Kinnikuman Nisei: Muscle Carrot Competition! The Great Choujin War				
The Laughing Frog	Hideyuki Hirayama	Kyōzō Nagatsuka, Nene Ootsuka, Yuika Motokariya	Comedy	
One Piece the Movie: Chopper's Kingdom on the Island of Strange Animals		Mayumi Tanaka, Kazuya Nakai, Akemi Okamura, Kappei Yamaguchi, Hiroaki Hirata, Ikue Ōtani	Fantasy anime	
Poketto Monsutā Ratiasu and Ratiosu, the Guardian Gods of the Water Capital			Fantasy anime	
Returner	Takashi Yamazaki	Anne Suzuki, Takeshi Kaneshiro	Science fiction	
The Ring	Gore Verbinski	Naomi Watts, Martin Henderson, Brian Cox	Psychological supernatural horror	
A Saloon Wet with Beautiful Women	Tatsurō Kashihara	Koharu Yamasaki	Pink	Best Film, Pink Grand Prix
Suicide Club	Shion Sono	Ryo Ishibashi, Masatoshi Nagase	Horror	
Tomie: The Final Chapter -Forbidden Fruit-				
The Twilight Samurai	Yoji Yamada	Hiroyuki Sanada	Samurai film	Blue Ribbon Award winner Japan Academy Prize for Best Film
Ultraman Cosmos 2: The Blue Planet		Kaori Sakagami, Hidekazu Ichinose		
Women in the Mirror	Yoshishige Yoshida	Mariko Okada, Yoshiko Tanaka	Drama	Screened at the 2002 Cannes Film Festival

== See also ==
- 2002 in Japan
- 2002 in Japanese television
