= Ikebukuro West Gate Park =

Japanese novel series

池袋ウエストゲートパーク
- Novel series
- Written by: Ira Ishida
- Published by: Bungeishunju
- Original run: September 1998 – present
- Volumes: 19
- Manga
- Written by: Ira Ishida
- Illustrated by: Sena Aritō
- Published by: Akita Shoten
- English publisher: NA: Digital Manga Publishing
- Magazine: Young Champion
- Original run: July 2001 – November 25, 2004
- Volumes: 4
- Manga

IWGP: Denshi no Hoshi
- Written by: Masashi Asaki
- Published by: Kodansha
- Magazine: Weekly Shōnen Magazine
- Published: November 28, 2003
- Volumes: 1
- Manga

Ikebukuro West Gate Park R
- Written by: Ira Ishida
- Illustrated by: Sena Aritō
- Published by: Akita Shoten
- Magazine: Young Champion
- Published: October 20, 2008
- Volumes: 1
- Anime television series
- Directed by: Tomoaki Koshida
- Written by: Fumihiko Shimo
- Music by: Daijirō Nakagawa; Ryūichi Takada
- Studio: Doga Kobo
- Licensed by: Crunchyroll (Note: In North America through Crunchyroll, LLC (formerly known as Funimation).)
- Original network: AT-X, Tokyo MX, Sun TV, KBS, BS11
- Original run: October 6, 2020 – December 22, 2020
- Episodes: 12
- Television drama
- Ikebukuro West Gate Park (2000)

Ikebukuro West Gate Park (池袋ウエストゲートパーク), usually referred to by its initials IWGP, is a series of urban mystery novels by Ira Ishida. It was adapted into a drama television series directed by Yukihiko Tsutsumi. The television drama then got a manga adaptation. An anime television series adaptation of the original novel by Doga Kobo aired from October to December 2020.

== Plot ==
The series revolves around 20-year-old Makoto, who frequently gets involved in highly dangerous situations, usually against his own judgment.

== Characters ==
Makoto Majima (真島誠, Majima Makoto)
Voiced by: Kentarō Kumagai (Japanese); Griffin Puatu (English)
A 20 year old punk, Makoto loves to cut loose and pick up chicks. He is very charismatic, and is frequently approached by people who need help in desperate situations. Makoto has a vengeful side, which is seen after his girlfriend, Rika, was brutally murdered by an unknown assailant. Makoto also has school ties with the leader of the local gang, G Boys, and can call on him for help if he truly needs it. Raised in a single parent household, Makoto's mother runs a local fruit shop, and frequently uses and abuses him to watch the store.
TV Version: In the TV version Makoto is very similar to his manga counterpart. He is more fleshed out in the TV version. He frequently cons people into losing bets at one of the local bowling alleys, and also becomes an unofficial member of the G Boys. Makoto also falls for a girl that his mother hires for part-time help, a character that only appears in the TV series.
Rika Nakamura (中村リカ, Nakamura Rika)
Rika is Makoto's girlfriend and is a typical teenage ganguro. They first met at the fountain at IWGP, although there are some slight differences between the manga and the TV versions. Rika would sell herself for money, and was found strangled in a motel after a botched meeting.
TV Version: In the TV version Rika is more demanding, and is described by Hikaru as a person who will use other people in order to get what they want.
Hikaru Shibusawa (渋沢光, Shibusawa Hikaru)
Rika's best friend, Hikaru, is the more innocent seeming of the two, although she hides a horribly tragic past and a terrifying secret. In the TV series, she is much more forward in her attraction towards Makoto, whereas she is less so in the manga. Hikaru's real name is Hikariko (光子), although she has a deep loathing of the name.
TV Version: In the TV version Hikaru is less innocent than her manga counterpart, and is also incredibly jealous of any female attention Makoto receives, even when it is obvious that it is not romantically inclined. Hikaru's actions are also more erratic in the series, and at times her actions will push Makoto farther away than she'd like. When Yamai starts following her, Takashi posts guards around her.

Takashi Ando (安藤崇, Ando Takashi) (G Boys King)

Voiced by: Koki Uchiyama (Japanese); Howard Wang (English)
An old school-mate of Makoto's, Takashi is the leader of the G Boys, a local gang. He frequently comes off as goofy or playful, but that hides his true personality as a ruthless leader who will do anything to meet his own needs. He frequently comes to Makoto's aid whenever it is needed, but will not hesitate to ask for favors in return.
TV Version: In the TV version Takashi has an older girlfriend named Jessie, who is almost always at his side. Takashi is more ruthless in the TV series, and has more of a role than in the manga. Surprisingly, he is very anti-drug and refuses to allow any of his gang members to purchase or use drugs, (although he did allow one member to purchase drugs in order to flush out a drug pusher.)
Shun Mizuno (水野シュン, Mizuno Shun)
A young artist, Shun first meets Makoto and Masa while he is shoplifting in a local bookstore. Shy and quiet, Shun craves the approval of Makoto and his friends, and breaks laws just to fit in.
TV Version: In the TV version Shun is quieter and has less of a role. Since Hikaru is present at the time of the Chiaki incident, she is the one who purchases the drugs instead of Shun. Also, Makoto and Masa first meet Shun as he is shoplifting at a bookstore, and he actually steals a local landmark later in order to impress them.
Masa Mori (森マサ, Mori Masa)
Makoto's best friend and a would-be ladies man. He often tries (with not much success) to hit on girls, but most often spends his time with Makoto.
TV Version: In the TV version Masa has a part-time job at one of the local bowling alleys, where he and Makoto often scam people out of their money.
Yamai (山井武士)
Yamai was formerly an old schoolmate of Makoto and Takashi, and had even challenged Takashi to a fight. He is best known for killing a blood thirsty doberman at the request of a group of schoolmates. Yamai kidnaps Hikaru, with his only explanation being that she "is just like him".
TV Version: In the TV version Yamai temporarily joins the G Boys, and tries to sell drugs in order to incriminate Takashi. When Takashi discovers this, he cuts off Yamai's finger and throws him out of the G Boys.
Kyōichi (キョウイチ)
Voiced by: Reiō Tsuchida (Japanese); Billy Kametz (English)
Masaru Taniguchi (谷口マサル, Taniguchi Masaru)
Voiced by: Chiaki Kobayashi
Mitsuki Fujimoto (藤本ミツキ, Fujimoto Mitsuki)
Voiced by: Ayumu Murase (Japanese); Justin Briner (English)
Minoru Tamotsu (ミノル・タモツ, Tamotsu Minoru)
Voiced by: Tarusuke Shingaki
Kurō (クロウ)
Voiced by: Kensho Ono
Saru (サル)
Voiced by: Ryōhei Kimura
Zero-One (ゼロワン, Zero Wan)
Voiced by: Junichi Suwabe (Japanese); Anthony Bowling (English)
Shadow (シャドウ, Shadō)
Voiced by: Kenjiro Tsuda
Reiichirō Yokoyama (横山礼一郎, Yokoyama Reiichirō)
Voiced by: Takahiro Sakurai (Japanese); Daman Mills (English)
Yoshioka (吉岡, Yoshioka)
Voiced by: Nobuyuki Hiyama (Japanese); Brook Chalmers (English)
Makoto's mother (マコトの母, Makoto no Haha)
Voiced by: Yūko Kaida

== Media ==
=== Anime ===
On September 2, 2019, it was announced that the novel series would receive an anime television series adaptation by Doga Kobo. The series was directed by Tomoaki Koshida, with Fumihiko Shimo handling series composition, Junichirō Taniguchi designing the characters and Daijirō Nakagawa and Ryūichi Takada composing the music. The series was originally set to premiere in July 2020. However, it was delayed to October 6 due to the COVID-19 pandemic. The Pinballs performed the opening theme "Needle Knot," while Innosent in Formal performed the ending theme "after song." Funimation acquired the series and streamed it on their website in North America and the British Isles, and on AnimeLab in Australia and New Zealand. The series ran for 12 episodes.

On September 12, 2021, Funimation announced the series would receive an English dub, which premiered the following day.

No.	Title (Note: All English titles are taken from Funimation.)	Directed by	Written by	Original release date
1	"North Gate Smoke Tower"; Transliteration: "Kitaguchi Sumōku Tawā" (Japanese: 北口スモークタワー)	Tomoaki Koshida	Fumihiko Shimo	October 6, 2020
2	"Nishi Ichibangai Shady Job"; Transliteration: "Nishī Ichibangai Burakku Baito" (Japanese: 西一番街ブラックバイト)	Hiroshi Haraguchi	Fumihiko Shimo	October 13, 2020
3	"ZettaMovier @ Metropolitan Theater"; Transliteration: "Zetamūbā @ Geijutsu Gekijō" (Japanese: ゼタムーバー@芸術劇場)	Kim Sung-min	Fumihiko Shimo	October 20, 2020
4	"Waltz for Baby"; Transliteration: "Warutsu Fō Bebī" (Japanese: ワルツ・フォー・ベビー)	Akira Toba	Tomoaki Koshida	October 27, 2020
5	"Dragon Tears"; Transliteration: "Doragon Tiāzu" (Japanese: ドラゴン・ティアーズ)	Hodaka Kuramoto	Masashi Sogo	November 3, 2020
6	"G-Boys Winter War, Part 1"; Transliteration: "G-Bōizu Fuyu Sensō Zenpen" (Japanese: Gボーイズ冬戦争・前編)	Midori Yui	Masashi Sogo	November 10, 2020
7	"G-Boys Winter War, Part 2"; Transliteration: "G-Bōizu Fuyu Sensō Kōhen" (Japanese: Gボーイズ冬戦争・後編)	Hiroshi Haraguchi	Masashi Sogo	November 17, 2020
8	"Senkawa Fall Out Mother"; Transliteration: "Senkawa Fōru Auto Mazā" (Japanese: 千川フォールアウト・マザー)	Kim Sung-min	Masashi Sogo	November 24, 2020
9	"Hatred on Parade"; Transliteration: "Zōo no Parēdo" (Japanese: 憎悪のパレード)	Kazuki Kawagoe	Fumihiko Shimo	December 1, 2020
10	"Beastly Reunion"; Transliteration: "Yajū to Riyunion" (Japanese: 野獣とリユニオン)	Midori Yui; Tomoaki Koshida	Masashi Sogo	December 8, 2020
11	"Sunshine Street Civil War, Part 1"; Transliteration: "Sanshain-dōri Shibiru Wō Zenpen" (Japanese: サンシャイン通り内戦(シビルウォー)・前編)	Akira Toba	Fumihiko Shimo	December 15, 2020
12	"Sunshine Street Civil War, Part 2"; Transliteration: "Sanshain-dōri Shiviru Wō Kōhen" (Japanese: サンシャイン通り内戦(シヴィルウォー)・後編)	Tomoaki Koshida	Fumihiko Shimo	December 22, 2020
