= Yiyayiya =

2017 Chinese television series

- Chinese: 咿呀咿呀
- Genre: Children's television series
- Based on: Inai Inai Baa! by NHK
- Directed by: Zhu Wenyao; Liu Daku
- Starring: Huang Zhen<; Yu Yang; Zhou Haixia; Xu Mingjie; Zhang Yi (2017–2020); Sun Yatong (2020–)
- Country of origin: China
- Original language: Chinese

Production
- Production locations: Shanghai, China
- Running time: 15 min
- Production companies: NHK; SMG; Shanghai Xiyou Culture

Original release
- Network: Haha Xuandong TV
- Release: 1 July 2017 – November 2022

Related
- Inai Inai Baa!

Yiyayiya (Chinese: 咿呀咿呀) is a Chinese children's television series focusing on singing, dancing, gymnastics, handicrafts, and language. On July 1, 2017, it was broadcast on Haha Xuandong TV (哈哈炫动卫视) and other channels, and was one of the columns of "Baby Academy" (宝贝学院).

The program is co-produced by Shanghai Media Group and Shanghai Xiyou Culture (上海习游文化), with NHK providing some content and technical support. In November 2022, due to program arrangement issues with Haha Xuandong TV, Yiyayiya was suspended.

== Summary ==
Yiyayiya is adapted from Japanese children's program Inai Inai Baa! broadcast by NHK Educational TV. The program was filmed in Shanghai. It is hosted by Wangwang (汪汪), Wutang (乌糖), Xiaoyi (小亦), and Xiaotong (小瞳).
