= Ping Pong (2002 film) =

2002 Japanese film

- Theatrical release poster
- Directed by: Fumihiko Sori
- Written by: Kankurō Kudō
- Based on: Ping Pong by Taiyō Matsumoto
- Produced by: Shinji Ogawa; Sanae Suzuki; Tamotsu Shiina
- Starring: Yosuke Kubozuka; Arata; Sam Lee; Shidō Nakamura; Kōji Ōkura; Naoto Takenaka; Mari Natsuki
- Cinematography: Akira Sakoh
- Edited by: Soichi Ueno
- Music by: Mao
- Production companies: Asmik Ace; TBS
- Distributed by: Asmik Ace (Japan)
- Release date: July 20, 2002 (Japan)
- Running time: 114 minutes
- Country: Japan
- Languages: Japanese; Cantonese

Ping Pong (Japanese: ピンポン, Hepburn: Pin Pon) is a 2002 Japanese sports film directed by Fumihiko Sori, and starring Yōsuke Kubozuka, Arata Iura, Nakamura Shidō II, and Sam Lee. It is based on Taiyō Matsumoto's manga series of the same name and is about the friendship between two high school table tennis players.

The film concentrates on these two friends, their two mentors, and three players who they encounter at high school table tennis tournaments. It explores the different motivations and philosophies that they have towards table tennis and tries to portray the excitement and subtlety of the sport.

Nakamura won the Newcomer of the Year Award at the 26th Japan Academy Film Prizes for his performance. The film was nominated in seven other categories, including for Picture of the Year and Director of the Year.

A 4K restoration and Blu-ray edition is set to be released by 88 Films on July 27, 2026.

== Plot ==
Yutaka "Peco" Hoshino and Makoto "Smile" Tsukimoto are members of Katase High table tennis club. Peco is charismatic and has a passion for the sport, while Smile is introverted. Tsukimoto's friends in the table tennis club nicknamed him "Smile" as he does not smile often. The characters have known each other, and Manabu "Demon" Sakuma, since primary school. Despite Smile's greater natural talent, he sees the sport as simply a way to pass the time, and often lets less able players such as Peco beat him out of consideration for their feelings.

Peco hears about a new table tennis player brought over from Shanghai, to beat local hero Dragon for Tsujido Academy: Kǒng "China" Wéngé. Ryūichi "Dragon" Kazama plays for the fight, in search of a worthy opponent. In an informal set, China completely shuts out Peco, winning 21 to 0. Peco is devastated by the loss. This is compounded at the next inter-school competition where Demon also beats Peco in the third round of the tournament. Smile, meanwhile, lets China beat him out of kindness for his opponent. Demon's team from Kaio Academy—led by Dragon, a top competitor and strict disciplinarian—wins the overall competition.

Demon confronts Peco, telling him he lost because he was coasting. Peco jumps into a river as a symbolic rebirth and trains with Tamura to get back into his school team. In the next high school tournament, Peco beats China in the first round and Dragon in the semi-final despite an injured knee. During this match, Dragon experiences the joy of playing table tennis for the first time. Peco and Smile meet in the final. Several years later, Peco has fulfilled his dream of playing professionally in Europe, while Smile helps a young boy learn the sport. A photo behind Smile shows Peco, Smile and Dragon having taken first, second and third places respectively.

== Cast ==
- Yōsuke Kubozuka as Yutaka "Peco" Hoshino
- Arata Iura as Makoto "Smile" Tsukimoto
- Sam Lee Chan-sam as Kǒng "China" Wéngé
- Nakamura Shidō II as Ryūichi "Dragon" Kazama
- Kôji Ohkura as Manabu "Demon" Sakuma
- Naoto Takenaka as Jō "Butterfly Joe" Koizumi
- Mari Natsuki as "Obaba"

== Soundtrack ==
1. Yumegiwa Last Boy—Supercar (4:11)
2. Spring Sponsor—Subtle (4:55)
3. Strobolights—Supercar (3:27)
4. La Peggi (Ping Pong Original Short Size)—Takkyū Ishino (4:58)
5. E.D.E.N. (Ping Pong Original Short Size)—Dub Squad (5:23)
6. Rise (Ping Pong Original Short Size)—Sugar Plant (6:37)
7. Breakdown—[Ma-O] (2:21)
8. Before (Ping Pong Original Short Size)—Group (6:02)
9. Canned Beat—World Famous (3:01)
10. No Sun (Ping Pong Original Short Size)—Yoshinori Sunahara (4:28)
11. Scatterin' Monkey—Boom Boom Satellites (5:26)
12. Cicabow (Ping Pong Original Short Size)—Cicada (4:52)
13. The Good Timing of World of Love Song—Yoshinori Sunahara (2:21)
14. Angelic Butterfly—[Ma-O] (1:51)
15. Free Your Soul—Supercar (4:19)

== Reception ==
Ping Pong was nominated for eight categories at the 26th Japan Academy Film Prize in 2003; Shidō Nakamura won the 'Newcomer of the Year' prize for his performance as Dragon.

The review aggregator website Rotten Tomatoes reported an 75% approval rating with an average rating of 6,60/10, based on 20 critic reviews. Jeannette Catsoulis from The New York Times praised the film and stated "Stylistically stunning and completely nuts, Ping Pong is nevertheless perceptive about male social hierarchies and the benefits of knowing your place. Between the pistoning elbows and whizzing balls, the director, Sori, repeatedly films his protagonists sitting on stairs, subtly altering their positions as the story progresses. In fact, when not busying himself with slow-motion sweat and eye-popping backspins, Sori has a lot to say about the heart-versus-skill conflict and the demands of natural talent. It's just difficult to hear him over the noise of those balls".
