= Ikebukuro West Gate Park (TV series) =

- Written by: Kankurō Kudō
- Starring: Tomoya Nagase; Ken Watanabe; Ai Kato; Yōsuke Kubozuka; Tomohisa Yamashita; Koyuki
- Country of origin: Japan
- Original language: Japanese
- No. of episodes: 11 + 1 special

Production
- Running time: approx. 46:00
- Production company: TBS

Original release
- Network: TBS
- Release: April 14 – June 23, 2000

Ikebukuro West Gate Park (池袋ウエストゲートパーク, Ikebukuro Uesuto Gēto Pāku) is a Japanese television drama by screenwriter Kankurō Kudō. Based on a novel by Ira Ishida, it initially aired on the Tokyo Broadcasting System during the summer of 2000, and was directed by Yukihiko Tsutsumi. The success of the television series would launch a manga adaptation the following year. In a break from traditional Japanese programming, the series used edgy graphics and scene breaks to highlight a story involving themes drawn from the underbelly of modern Japanese society: hip-hop youth gang warfare, juvenile delinquency, prostitution, drug abuse, the Yakuza, rape and murder.

Notable among the cast are Tokio lead singer Tomoya Nagase, film star Ken Watanabe, and future stars Koyuki, Satoshi Tsumabuki, and Tomohisa Yamashita of Johnny's Jimusho idol group NEWS. The series is also credited for raising the profile of actor Yōsuke Kubozuka.

== Synopsis ==
Twenty-one-year-old Makoto, the former #1 waru of Ikebukuro in his high school years, hangs out at the bowling alley and in the eponymous park (池袋西口公園 (Ikebukuro Nishiguchi-koen)) of the series with best friend Masa on a repetitive nightly basis. Their world starts to change as Shun, Rika, and Hikaru enter their lives after chance meetings in the park. Soon after, Rika is found raped and murdered in a love hotel, bringing unwanted police attention and a new detective to Ikebukuro on the trail of a serial rapist. After being suspected, arrested, and detained by the police in classic Japanese style (beatings, coerced confessions), Makoto is released and vows to find justice for Rika. Enlisting the help of Takashi, an old school friend, and his gang, the G-Boys, Makoto starts his search and gains a reputation for getting problems solved in the underworld of Ikebukuro - much to the consternation of Yokoyama and the police. Things then begin to spiral out of control in Ikebukuro, as not everything is what it seems to be...

== Characters ==
- Makoto Majima

Main character and primary protagonist of I.W.G.P., Makoto is a 20-year-old former waru without an obvious direction in his life at the start of the series. He commonly complains that things are "mendokusai" (bothersome). He earns spending money through petty theft and by hustling people at the bowling alley where he, Masa, and later the G-Boys hang out; he wins a BMW from Yokoyama in this fashion. During the day, he helps out at his mother's fruit shop; at night, he hangs out on the streets of Ikebukuro. After Rika is found murdered, Makoto's actions earn him a reputation as the "mover and shaker of Ikebukuro" by both the police and the underworld. Running gags involving his character include: his love of yakisoba covered in mayonnaise, bowling, and his uncooperative erection during his interactions with the women of the series.

- Masa

Makoto's best friend. Masa works at the bowling alley with Kaoru. Unlike Makoto, Masa eventually joins the G-Boys in order to retaliate against the Black Angels for their apparent murder of Shun.

- Rika Nakamura

Makoto's girlfriend. Rika typically dressed in ganguro style. She and Hikaru first meets Makoto and crew when the girls notice Shun drawing in the park, then join them for a night on the town. After meeting Makoto, Rika breaks things off with her sugar daddy. During one of their nightly adventures, Rika and Makoto sneak off to a love hotel. Soon after, Rika is called out by the serial rapist, and later found murdered.

- Hikaru Shibusawa

Rika's best friend. Her psychological issues underlie the dramatic action of the series, and form the critical plot that brings the series to its climax.

- Takashi Ando

Eccentric schoolmate of Makoto and "King" of the G-Boys, an "Oriental-style Asian Gang" (per their business card) based out of a van-conversion who identify with the color yellow. Son of a senile sentō owner, he dates an older woman named "Jessie" who is fluent in Russian. While highly violent and skilled in close quarters combat, he does not allow drug use or sales within his gang. He constantly pesters Makoto to join the G-Boys, but continues to support Makoto's missions despite his rejection.

- Black Angels

Rival gang, identified with the color black, started by the ballet-dancing Kyoichi Ozaki.

- Shun Mizuno

A quiet artistic loner with a penchant for drawing disturbing images, he is initially approached by Makoto and Masa after they catch him shoplifting from a local bookstore. He later asks to join their group, offering Ikefukurō-zō, the symbol of Ikebukuro that he had just lifted and becomes a critical member of their ingroup. Shun dates Kaoru, the girl who works at the bowling alley, during the latter part of the series. In the buildup to the final climax of the series, Shun is murdered by Yamai and the Black Angels as part of a wider plot.

- Yamai

Nicknamed "Doberman" for his beating of a chained dog, Yamai was a schoolmate of Makoto and serves as a constant foil to Makoto and Takashi. He is easily beaten in a showdown with Takashi, after which he attempts revenge by trying to implicate Takashi in drug dealing. Yamai later joins the Black Angels, is critical to the plot that brings the series to its climax, and is responsible for the death of Shun.

- Fujio Saitou

Nicknamed "Saru" (monkey), Fujio is a former schoolmate of Makoto who joined the local Yakuza family because he was tired of being "weak". He was assigned to look over and protect the daughter of the Boss; his mistakes bring the Yakuza to ask for Makoto's help, but the results cost Saitou his pinky. He appears as an ally and contact for Makoto throughout the series.

- Yokoyama

A hard-nosed, no-nonsense detective brought into Ikebukuro in response to the presence of a serial rapist and the growing presence of youth gangs in the ward. He orders the initial beating and questioning of Makoto after Rika is found dead, which ends only when locals are brought in to testify for Makoto's character.

- Ritsuko Majima

Makoto's mother. A former snack bar hostess who raised Makoto as a single mother, she now runs a small fruit shop and tends to get involved in get-rich-quick schemes. Often lying about her age, she dresses and acts younger than her 42 years. She is the love interest of the local detective.

- Chiaki

Sex worker and former classmate of Makoto who works at Last Chance, the "soapland" across the street from the Majima's fruit shop - which she frequents to gossip. After Makoto gains a reputation for getting things done, she asked him to help out her client/boyfriend Ali, who found himself in trouble after attacking her drug dealer in an attempt to help her clean up. Ali reveals her real name is Emi.

- Kana Matsui

A girl hired by Ritsuko to help out around the shop, she becomes a love interest for Makoto. After leaving the shop, he discovers her working as a nursery school teacher, and later as a prostitute for the local Yakuza boss. She ends up stabbed as part of the elaborate plot that works to the climax of the series.

== Main cast ==
- Tomoya Nagase – Makoto Majima
- Ai Kato – Hikaru Shibusawa
- Yōsuke Kubozuka – Takashi, G-Boys King
- Tomohisa Yamashita – Shun Mizuno
- Ryuta Sato – Masa
- Koyuki – Kana Matsui
- Satoshi Tsumabuki – Fujio Saitou
- Issei Takahashi – Kazunori Morinaga
- Aiko Morishita – Ritsuko Majima
- Ken Watanabe – Detective Yokoyama
- Sadao Abe – Hamaguchi
- Kazuhiro Nishijima – Kyoichi Ozaki
- Kenji Sakaguchi – Yamai (Doberman)
- Kitaro – Yoshioka
- Shin Yazawa – Chiaki
- Wakana Sakai – Rika

== Episodes ==
The series is comprised by 11 episodes and 1 special, with the names of the episodes formed by a play on words of the number of episode, such as Strawberry (Ichigo) for the first, Carrot (Ninjin) for the second, Mandarin Orange (Mikan) for the third, and so forth. The special also received such type of name, being it "Soup".

No.	Title	Original release date
1	"Strawberry Episode"; Transliteration: "Ichigo Episode" (Japanese: イチゴ)	14 April 2000
Makoto meets the beautiful Rika and her friend Hikaru. When Rika comes up mysteriously killed, Makoto enlists the help of the local gang G Boys to find her murderer. They believe that she was the latest victim of a serial rapist, who abducts and strangles his captives.
2	"Carrot Episode"; Transliteration: "Ninjin Episode" (Japanese: ニンジン)	21 April 2000
Reeling from the brutal murder, Makoto swears revenge on the murderer of Rika. With the G Boys' help, Makoto may have found the culprit. However, he swears that he didn't murder Rika. Can he be telling the truth? If so, then who is the true killer?
3	"Mandarin Orange Episode"; Transliteration: "Mikan Episode" (Japanese: みかん)	28 April 2000
Makoto has been enlisted (thanks to Takashi) to find the missing daughter of a Yakuza boss. He has to find her in one week or pay the ultimate price. With leads on her disappearance being scarce to non-existent, Makoto's only hope lies in a mysterious person named Kazunori. A shut in whose only link to the world is through his computers and telescopes, Kazunori shows Makoto evidence that leads him to the discovery of the missing girl and her killer. Not only has he raped and accidentally murdered the yakuza boss's daughter, but he is also the serial rapist everyone was looking for. However, with this discovery Makoto begins to realize that the true killer of Rika is still at large.
4	"Shiitake Mushroom Episode"; Transliteration: "Shiitake Episode" (Japanese: しいたけ)	5 May 2000
Makoto has become quite well known around IWGP as an all around problem solver, and even has a little bit of a following! He's approached by an old classmate, Chiaki, who asks for his help in saving the life of her boyfriend, Ali. Makoto discovers that Chiaki works as a prostitute in one of the local brothels. One of Chiaki's customers got her addicted to speed, and Ali confronted him. Unbeknownst to Ali, the man he confronted was a drug pusher for some very dangerous people, and as such he has to go into hiding. Makoto manages to get the drug ring arrested, but unfortunately was unable to keep Ali from getting deported as a result. Meanwhile, Hikaru is questioning Makoto about what she is to him, and is also approached by Yamai, who tells her that he is leaving IWGP for a while.
5	"GORILLA Episode"; Transliteration: "Gorira Episode" (Japanese: ゴリラ)	12 May 2000
Someone has been broken into Hikaru's room and scrawled nasty messages over her pictures and trashed her room. Hikaru asks Makoto for protection from whmever is doing this. Makoto has now been approached by Sachiko, a former female classmate of his turned male who now calls himself Shou. He has started recruiting lovely young women to star on a live camera website called 'The Fairy's Garden'. Shou wants Makoto to track down and deter a forceful male stalker from harassing a client of his, Ayumi. The stalker, Tsukasa, has been calling her constantly, leaving creepy messages, as well as sending nasty "presents". After a botched meeting to request that he stop, Tsukasa breaks into Ayumi's apartment to force himself on her. Shou manages to stop him and gets the stalker arrested. Meanwhile, Makoto's mother has hired a beautiful new girl for part-time help named Kana, much to Makoto's joy. Also, it is discovered that the one stalking Hikaru has been Yamai. Takashi begins to question what the true link between Yamai and Hikaru is, believing that Yamai must have a deeper reason to follow her.
6	"Channel 6 (TBS) Episode"; Transliteration: "6-Chaneru Episode" (Japanese: 6チャンネル)	19 May 2000
Makoto and Hikaru go out on their first date, with humorous results. They discover a young boy, Hiroki, sitting outside counting stars. He befriends the pair, and confides in them that he has a learning disability, and is also OCD. Hiroki takes several pills in order to correct these. When Hiroki is kidnapped, Makoto is approached about finding him. Hiroki's mother believes that he has been kidnapped by his brother, Erito, who has been having money problems lately. Makoto must find the two brothers before the police or their yakuza father does. The new girl, Kana, has drawn in many new customers, much to the joy of Makoto's mother. Makoto finds himself beginning to fall for Kana's gentle demeanor. Hikaru walks in on a very cozy scene between the two of them, and introduces herself as Hikariko, which she had never referred to herself as before, and begins to act bizarrely. Kazunori also makes a reappearance in this episode as an informant (and has moved out of his room), and helps Makoto track down Hiroki. Also appearing in this episode is a mysterious man, Kyoichi, who appears in the middle of a G Boys ceremony, interrupting Jessie's dance with his own dance. At the end of the episode, Makoto invites Kana out for a drink, and she kisses a very bewildered Makoto.
7	"Youshichi Episode"; Transliteration: "Yōshichi Episode" (Japanese: 洋七)	26 May 2000
Makoto's head is in the clouds after the previous night's kiss from Kana, only to discover that she has quit the job to go work at a kindergarten. Makoto's mother begins to act bizarrely, talking to a woman who isn't there. In fact, everyone is talking to this invisible woman, and the only person who can't see her is Makoto! Makoto traces the name of the invisible woman to his mother's pyramid scheme group, and enlists Kazunori's help in tracking down information about her, as well as the whereabouts of the elusive Kana. Makoto infiltrates the money group, only to hear a moving speech by his mother. Afterwards another group member (bribed by a free meal) states that there is a rumour that the group is a cover for a yakuza group, and that the speaker (Makoto's mother) is dating one of the head bosses of the yakuza. Makoto's newfound respect for his mother (because of her speech) creeps her out, so it is hard for him to question her. Before Makoto can ask her anymore questions, one of his friends appears, beaten by one of the G Boys. Angry, Makoto confronts Takashi, demanding to know who did it. Makoto is also reunited with Kana, who reassures him that it was not his fault that she quit. An angry Hikaru watches them balefully through the window of the restaurant they met in. It is revealed that Kyoichi wants to be the new G Boys King. Makoto discovers that the tea leaves were psychedelic, and that the rumor about the group being a front for the yakuza was correct. Makoto's mother was also mistakenly kidnapped by a group of yakuza who had meant to kidnap Kana. (The picture they were given of Kana also had her in it.) She was returned safely by the chief of police.
8	"Youhachi Episode"; Transliteration: "Yōhachi Episode" (Japanese: 洋八)	2 June 2000
9	"Kyushu Episode"; Transliteration: "Kyūshū Episode" (Japanese: 九州)	9 June 2000
10	"Jutte (Jitte) Episode"; Transliteration: "Jitte Episode" (Japanese: 十手)	16 June 2000
11	"Samurai"; Transliteration: "Shi" (Japanese: 士)	23 May 2000
n–a	"Soup Episode (special)" Transliteration: "Sūpu Episode" (Japanese: スープ)	28 March 2003
The story is set three years after the conflict between the G Boys and the Black Angels. The main story is about solving an attack on a homeless person. The group heads to a Rize concert with tickets that Masa gave them. After the concert, each member continues to interact with Makoto and the others. As Masa and his friends chase the Black Angels, they come across members of Kisarazu Cat's Eye (in a cameo appearance) dressed in black. The master says, "Hey, doesn't that guy look just like me?" and runs away. Makoto is inside a bookstore with Masa, when realizing the day is the 22, day when he always calls Hikaru. As he calls, he notices the ringtone from inside the bookstore. They spend time together, with her wishing to see him again. Makoto listens to the audience criticize Rize's music, saying that it's nothing more than the sound of crushed bones, so Makoto says he will crush his own arm. Takashi appears in front of him, when Makoto dodges the hammer hit and says he'll do it, and hits Makoto shattering the bone. The audience was silenced by the sight and the gruesomeness of the sound, and the situation was resolved. At the end of the episode, Makoto revealed that his arm was not broken. Takashi had hidden a pork bone.

== Awards ==
Ikebukuro West Gate Park won 7 Television Drama Academy Prize (Best Drama, Ensemble Cast, Opening sequence, Supporting Actor, Theme Song, Scriptwriter, and Director) from Japanese TV listings-Magazine The Television in 2000.

== See also ==
- Ikebukuro West Gate Park (manga)
- Television in Japan
