= 2002 in Japanese television =

Events in 2002 in Japanese television.

== Debuts ==
Show	Station	Premiere Date	Genre	Original Run
.hack//Sign	TV Tokyo	April 4	anime	April 4, 2002 – September 25, 2002
Ai Yori Aoshi	Fuji TV	April 11	anime	April 11, 2002 - September 26, 2002
Bakuten Shoot Beyblade 2002	TV Tokyo	January 7	anime	January 7, 2002 – December 30, 2002
Chobits	TBS	April 2	anime	April 2, 2002 – September 24, 2002
Dragon Drive	TV Tokyo	July 4	anime	July 4, 2002 – March 27, 2003
Digimon Frontier	Fuji TV	April 7	anime	April 7, 2002 - March 30, 2003
Full Moon o Sagashite	TV Tokyo	April 6	anime	April 6, 2002 – March 29, 2003
Kamen Rider Ryuki	TV Asahi	February 3	tokusatsu	February 3, 2002 – January 19, 2003
Kanon	Fuji TV	January 30	anime	January 30, 2002 - March 27, 2002
Kinnikuman Second Generations	TV Tokyo	January 9	anime	January 9, 2002 – December 25, 2002
Kitty's Paradise Fresh	TV Tokyo	October 1	children's variety	October 1, 2002 – September 27, 2005
Magical Shopping Arcade Abenobashi	Kids Station	April 4	anime	April 4, 2002 – June 27, 2002
Naruto	TV Tokyo	October 3	anime	October 3, 2002 - February 8, 2007
Ninpuu Sentai Hurricaneger	TV Asahi	February 17	tokusatsu	February 17, 2002 – February 9, 2003
Ojamajo Doremi Dokkan!	TV Asahi	February 3	anime	February 3, 2002 – January 26, 2003
Panyo Panyo Di Gi Charat	Kids Station	January 9	anime	January 9, 2002 – September 25, 2002
Piano	Kids Station	November 11	anime	November 11, 2002 – January 13, 2003
Pocket Monsters Advanced Generation	TV Tokyo	November 21	anime	November 21, 2002 - September 14, 2006
Rizelmine	Kids Station	April 2	anime	April 2, 2002 – June 25, 2002
Rockman.EXE	TV Tokyo	March 4	anime	March 4, 2002 - March 31, 2003
Shomuni FINAL	Fuji TV	July 3	drama	July 3, 2002 – September 18, 2002
Tokyo Mew Mew	TV Tokyo	April 6	anime	April 6, 2002 – March 29, 2003
Tsuribaka Nisshi	TV Asahi	November 2	anime	November 2, 2002 - September 13, 2003
Weiß Kreuz Glühen	Kids Station	November 28	anime	November 28, 2002 – February 20, 2003
You're Under Arrest	TV Asahi	October 17	drama	October 17, 2002 - December 12, 2002

== Ongoing shows ==
- Music Fair, music (1964-present)
- Mito Kōmon, jidaigeki (1969-2011)
- Sazae-san, anime (1969-present)
- FNS Music Festival, music (1974-present)
- Panel Quiz Attack 25, game show (1975-present)
- Doraemon, anime (1979-2005)
- Soreike! Anpanman, anime (1988-present)
- Downtown no Gaki no Tsukai ya Arahende!!, game show (1989-present)
- Crayon Shin-chan, anime (1992-present)
- Shima Shima Tora no Shimajirō, anime (1993-2008)
- Nintama Rantarō, anime (1993-present)
- Chibi Maruko-chan, anime (1995-present)
- Kochira Katsushika-ku Kameari Kōen-mae Hashutsujo, anime (1996-2004)
- Detective Conan, anime (1996-present)
- SASUKE, sports (1997-present)
- Ojarumaru, anime (1998-present)
- One Piece, anime (1999–present)
- Yu-Gi-Oh! Duel Monsters, anime (2000-2004)
- Tottoko Hamtaro, anime (2000-2004)
- InuYasha, anime (2000-2004)
- Kirby of the Stars, anime (2001-2003)
- Hikaru no Go, anime (2001-2003)
- The Prince of Tennis, anime (2001-2005)

== Hiatus ==
Show	Station	Hiatus Date	Genre	Original Run
Rizelmine	Kids Station	June 25th	anime	April 2, 2002 – June 25, 2002

== Returning ==
Show	Station	Hiatus Date	Genre	Original Run
Rizelmine	Kids Station	October 8th	anime	October 8, 2002 – December 24, 2002

== Endings ==
Show	Station	Ending Date	Genre	Original Run
.hack//Sign	TV Tokyo	September 25	anime	April 4, 2002 – September 25, 2002
A Little Snow Fairy Sugar	TBS	March 26	anime	October 2, 2001 – March 26, 2002
Ai Yori Aoshi	Fuji TV	September 26	anime	April 11, 2002 - September 26, 2002
Bakuten Shoot Beyblade 2002	TV Tokyo	December 30	anime	January 7, 2002 – December 30, 2002
Chobits	TBS	September 24	anime	April 2, 2002 – September 24, 2002
Cyborg 009: The Cyborg Soldier	TV Tokyo	October 13	anime	October 14, 2001 – October 13, 2002
Daa! Daa! Daa!	NHK	February 26	anime	March 28, 2000 – February 26, 2002
Digimon Tamers	Fuji TV	March 31	anime	April 1, 2001 – March 31, 2002
Groove Adventure RAVE	TBS	September 28	anime	October 13, 2001 – September 28, 2002
Hajime no Ippo: THE FIGHTING!	Nippon TV	March 26	anime	October 3, 2000 - March 26, 2002
Hellsing	Fuji TV	January 16	anime	October 10, 2001 – January 16, 2002
Hyakujuu Sentai Gaoranger	TV Asahi	February 10	tokusatsu	February 18, 2001 – February 10, 2002
Kamen Rider Agito	TV Asahi	January 27	tokusatsu	January 28, 2001 – January 27, 2002
Kanon	Fuji TV	March 27	anime	January 30, 2002 - March 27, 2002
Kinnikuman Second Generations	TV Tokyo	December 25	anime	January 9, 2002 – December 25, 2002
Kitty's Paradise GOLD	TV Tokyo	September 24	children's variety	April 4, 2000 – September 24, 2002
Magical Shopping Arcade Abenobashi	Kids Station	June 27	anime	April 4, 2002 – June 27, 2002
Martial Arts Cooking Legend Bistro Recipe	NHK	June 25	anime	December 11, 2001 - June 25, 2002
Motto! Ojamajo Doremi	TV Asahi	January 27	anime	February 4, 2001 – January 27, 2002
PaRappa the Rapper	Fuji TV	January 11	anime	April 14, 2001 – January 11, 2002
Pocket Monsters	TV Tokyo	November 14	anime	April 16, 1998 - November 14, 2002
Rizelmine	Kids Station	December 24	anime	October 8, 2002 – December 24, 2002
Super GALS! Kotobuki Ran	TV Tokyo	March 31	anime	April 1, 2001 - March 31, 2002
Shaman King	TV Tokyo	September 25	anime	July 4, 2001 - September 25, 2002
Ultraman Cosmos	MBS	September 28	tokusatsu	July 7, 2001 – September 28, 2002
X	WOWOW	March 27	anime	October 3, 2001 – March 27, 2002
You're Under Arrest	TV Asahi	October 17	drama	October 17, 2002 - December 12, 2002

== See also ==
- 2002 in anime
- List of Japanese television dramas
- 2002 in Japan
- List of Japanese films of 2002
