= Kanagawa Yokosuka High School =

Coordinates: 35°15′24″N 139°40′12″E

Kanagawa Prefectural Yokosuka High School
- 神奈川県立横須賀高等学校
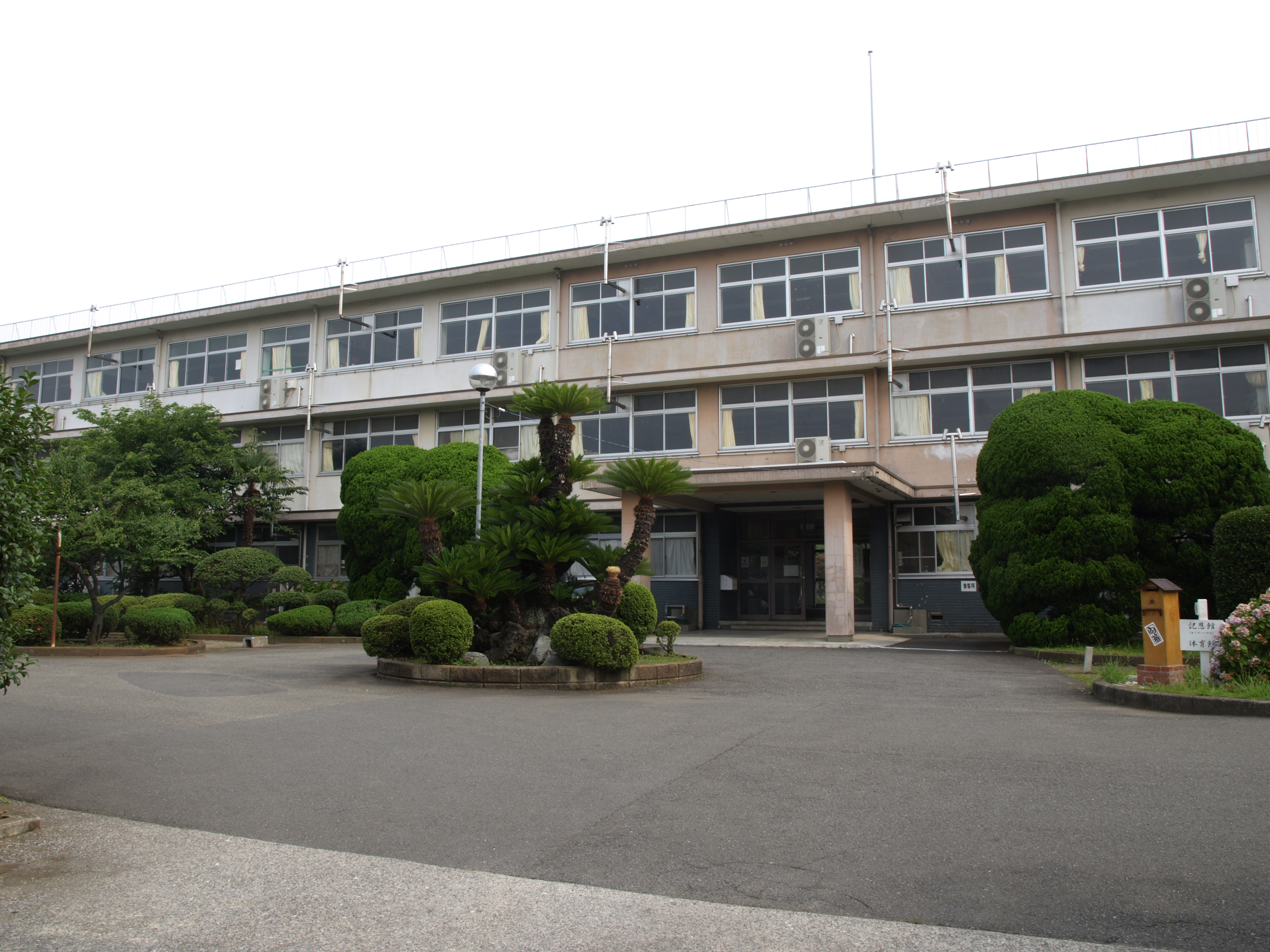
- Yokosuka High School
- Yokosuka, Kanagawa Prefecture; Japan

Information
- Established: 1908
- Website: www.pen-kanagawa.ed.jp/yokosuka-h/

Kanagawa Prefectural Yokosuka High School (神奈川県立横須賀高等学校, Kanagawa Kenritsu Yokosuka Kōtō Gakkō) is a high school in Yokosuka, Kanagawa Prefecture Japan, founded in 1907. The school is operated by the Kanagawa Prefectural Board of Education. As of 2014 the principal is Yoshiaki Kawaguchi (川口吉秋, Yoshiaki Kawaguchi) .

== Notable alumni ==
- Politician Junichirō Koizumi, 87th Prime Minister of Japan from 2001 to 2006
- Physicist Masatoshi Koshiba, Nobel Prize winner 2002
- Actor Yōsuke Kubozuka, dropout
- Actor Shunsuke Kubozuka, younger brother of Yosuke Kubozuka
- Judoka Isao Inokuma, Tokyo Olympic Gold Medalist
- Football player Hiroyuki Sakashita
- Football player Shuhei Terada
- Football player Tatsuya Suzuki
- Climatologist Atsumu Ohmura
- Ryo Hazuki from Shenmue
- Okikatsu Arao, colonel of the Imperial Japanese Army
- Takashi Saito, four-star admirals of the Japan Maritime Self-Defense Force, 2nd Joint Staff Office chief of staff
- Coroner Thomas Noguchi
- Anime designer Kazutaka Miyatake
