= Hiroyuki Sakashita =

Japanese footballer

Hiroyuki Sakashita 坂下 博之
Personal information
- Full name: Hiroyuki Sakashita
- Date of birth: May 6, 1959 (age 67)
- Place of birth: Miura, Kanagawa, Japan
- Height: 1.74 m (5 ft 8 1/2 in)
- Position: Defender

Youth career
- 1975–1977: Kanagawa Yokosuka High School
- 1978–1981: University of Tsukuba

Senior career*
Years	Team	Apps	(Gls)
1982–1990	Fujita Industries	158	(5)
1990–1991	Yomiuri	3	(0)
Total		161	(5)

International career
1980	Japan	1	(0)
Medal record
Fujita Industries
Runner-up	Emperor's Cup	1982
Runner-up	Emperor's Cup	1985
Runner-up	Emperor's Cup	1988
Yomiuri
Winner	Japan Soccer League	1990/91
- * Club domestic league appearances and goals

Hiroyuki Sakashita (坂下 博之, Sakashita Hiroyuki; born May 6, 1959) is a former Japanese football player. He played for Japan national team.

== Club career ==
Sakashita was born in Miura on May 6, 1959. After graduating from University of Tsukuba, he joined Fujita Industries in 1982. He played as regular player at the club. However, the club was relegated to Division 2 in 1990. He moved to Yomiuri in 1990 and retired in 1991. He played 161 games and scored 5 goals in the league.

== National team career ==
In December 1980, when Sakashita was a University of Tsukuba student, he was selected Japan national team for 1982 World Cup qualification. At this qualification, on December 28, he debuted against Macau.

== Club statistics ==
Club performance			League		Cup		League Cup		Total	
Season	Club	League	Apps	Goals	Apps	Goals	Apps	Goals	Apps	Goals
Japan			League		Emperor's Cup		JSL Cup		Total	
1982	Fujita Industries	JSL Division 1	13	0						
1983	Fujita Industries	JSL Division 1	18	0						
1984	Fujita Industries	JSL Division 1	18	0						
1985/86	Fujita Industries	JSL Division 1	22	0						
1986/87	Fujita Industries	JSL Division 1	22	0						
1987/88	Fujita Industries	JSL Division 1	22	2						
1988/89	Fujita Industries	JSL Division 1	22	3						
1989/90	Fujita Industries	JSL Division 1	21	0			4	2	25	2
1990/91	Yomiuri	JSL Division 1	3	0	2	0	0	0	5	0
Total			161	5	2	0	4	2	167	7

== National team statistics ==
Japan national team
Year	Apps	Goals
1980	1	0
Total	1	0
