= Mio's Cookbook =

- DVD cover
- みをつくし料理帖
- Directed by: Haruki Kadokawa
- Screenplay by: Itaru Era; Kana Matsui; Haruki Kadokawa
- Based on: Mio Tsukushi Ryōri-chō by Kaoru Takada
- Produced by: Shigeji Maeda
- Starring: Honoka Matsumoto; Nao; Mayumi Wakamura; Atsuko Asano; Yōsuke Kubozuka; Yuta Koseki; Takashi Fujii; Kōji Ishizaka; Nakamura Shidō II
- Cinematography: Nobuyasu Kita
- Music by: Masataka Matsutoya
- Production company: Rakueisha
- Distributed by: Toei Company, Ltd.
- Release date: October 16, 2020 (Japan)
- Running time: 131 minutes
- Country: Japan
- Language: Japanese

Mio's Cookbook (Japanese: みをつくし料理帖) is a 2020 Japanese period romance film. Directed by Haruki Kadokawa, it was adapted from Kaoru Takada's novel Cookbook of Devotion, Mio’s Cookbook.

The film featured at the Toronto Japanese Film Festival in 2021 and the Australian Japanese Film Festival in 2020.

== Plot ==
The movie starts in 1800, showing the friendship of two young girls, Mio and Noe. A flood destroys Osaka where they live and their lives are both destroyed when they lose their families.

The move then moves forward to 1820, but Mio is working in Edo, the Japanese capital. Mio loves cooking and initially fails at the restaurant she works at because she is cooking Osaka style. However, as she innovates, her restaurant starts to take off. After her restaurant is burnt down by rivals, she re-builds and a noble protects her from further harm. it is then that she is visited by a man representing a famed courtesan, who comes to her for her Osaka style cooking.

== Cast ==
- Honoka Matsumoto as Mio
- Nao as Noe
- Mayumi Wakamura
- Atsuko Asano
- Yōsuke Kubozuka as Komatsubara
- Yuta Koseki as Gensai Nagata
- Takashi Fujii
- Hironobu Nomura
- Misa Etō
- Noriko Watanabe
- Jun Murakami as Ukichi
- Toshiyuki Nagashima
- Kenichi Matsuyama
- Takashi Sorimachi
- Takaaki Enoki
- Takeshi Kaga
- Hiroko Yakushimaru
- Kōji Ishizaka (special appearance)
- Nakamura Shidō II
