= Ice (OVA) =

2007 original video animation

- Screenshot from the promotional trailer for the 2007 anime

アイス (Aisu)
- Genre: Post-apocalyptic, Science fiction, Yuri
- Created by: Yasushi Akimoto
- Original video animation
- Directed by: Makoto Kobayashi
- Produced by: Masaki Sawa; Keiichi Miyamoto; Hiroaki Inoue; Hiromi Chiba
- Written by: Yasushi Hirano; Makoto Kobayashi
- Music by: Won Il
- Studio: PPM
- Licensed by: NA: Sentai Filmworks
- Released: 25 May 2007 – 25 September 2007
- Runtime: 40 minutes
- Episodes: 3

Ice (アイス, Aisu) is a 2007 three-episode original video animation created by Yasushi Akimoto and directed by Makoto Kobayashi. It is set in the ruins of Tokyo in the near future, after an unspecified catastrophe has led to the death of all human males and many females. The group of twenty thousand surviving women who live there face the impending extinction of humanity. There are suggestions that the disaster was caused by human interference with nature, possibly biological warfare experiments or genetic engineering.

Many of the survivors blame men's warlike nature and scientific arrogance for the catastrophe. However, even though men have perished, the women who remain are forced to use violence in the face of bioterrorism and other threats. While some accept their fate as the last generation of humans, others see biological engineering as a final hope for the survival of the species.

== Characters ==
The show's creator Yasushi Akimoto is also the producer of idol group AKB48. The cast is a mixture of experienced voice actors and young AKB48 members.

Aoi (アオイ)
Voiced by: Tomomi Kasai (Japanese); Maggie Flecknoe (English)
A woman who is in the Guardwomen ranks with long brown hair. She later betrays her comrades on the notion of getting pregnant in the future, as promised by Julia.

Julia (ジュリア, Juria)
Voiced by: Akira Ishida (Japanese); Chris Patton (English)
The ruling Commander of the Guardswomen with long blonde hair, who opposes the Kisaragi's ideologies. Under her direct command she has a large group of girls who are uses to test the ICE project as well as serve her needs, be it of a sexual nature or just common chores.

Hitomi Aida (相田瞳, Aida Hitomi)
Voiced by: Haruna Ikezawa (Japanese); Stephanie Wittels (English)
A blonde woman who is hit by a truck on the first OVA. After that she seems to coexist within the mind of the Captain of the Guardswomen. Once she is awakened in a hospital in her own time, she is told she was clutching a gold ornament; it is identical to something Yuki Ice-T wore. Hitomi is also told she is pregnant, looping the story back to a pertinent point.

Hitomi Landsknecht (ヒトミ・ランツクネヒト, Hitomi Rantsukunehito)
Voiced by: Junko Minagawa (Japanese); Emily Neves (English)
The gray-haired Captain of the Guardswomen and protagonist of the series. She uses a swordblade and a large gun. She has not slept for three years.

Kisaragi (キサラギ)
Voiced by: Yoshino Ōtori (Japanese); Melissa Davis (English)
Head of the Kisaragi family, whose ideology is that if it is the fate of humanity to die, then let it be. She herself is the product of a genetic experiment, being a hybrid between a human and a jellyfish. She has pale white skin and long white hair.

Mint (ミント, Minto)
Voiced by: Eri Kitamura (Japanese); Elizabeth Bunch (English)
A Guardwoman with short green hair who seems more aggressive than the other guardswomen.

Murasaki (ムラサキ)
Voiced by: Natsuki Sato (Japanese); Shelley Calene-Black (English)
Second in command of the Guardswomen with long purple hair and a scar over her right eye. She follows always her captain to the bitter end.

Rinne (リンネ)
Voiced by: Yūko Ōshima (Japanese); Luci Christian (English)
A Guardswoman with a high intellect. She is a level minded person with long brownish blond hair.

Satsuki (サツキ)
Voiced by: Kurumi Mamiya (Japanese); Brittney Karbowski (English)
A violent girl who borderlines bipolarity. She is a loli-type character with long black hair in pigtails. She tries to kill Yuki numerous times in a jealous rage and beats her bloody later on, because of Yuki's feelings for the Captain of the Guardwomen.

Usuha (ウスハ)
Voiced by: Yū Imai (Japanese); Carlee Gabrisch (English)
A Guardwoman who is exceptional at logic. Her intellect is far superior to the other guardswomen. She has long brown hair and wears glasses.

Yuki Ice-T (ユキ, Yuki)
Voiced by: Erena Ono (Japanese); Serena Varghese (English)
A polite girl whose speech and personality seems detached from what is happening around her, as she does not flinch when in immediate danger; nor does it change after it is over. She is a Kisuragi daughter, but not by blood, and has long brown hair in pigtails. When she met the captain of the Guardswomen, she immediately wanted to be friends with her, as she saw this as a change of fate.

== Media ==
=== Episodes ===
Three episodes were released. Each was released in both limited-edition and standard DVD versions. The limited editions come with a figure, a small artbook, and special packaging. The DVDs were released in Japan by Bandai Visual.

No.	Title	Original release date
1	"Day 1: -Heart-"; Transliteration: "Ichinichi Me: Hato -HEART-" (Japanese: 一日目：はと-HEART-)	25 May 2007
2	"Day 2: -Rule-"; Transliteration: "Futsuka Me: Ruru -RULE-" (Japanese: 二日目：るる-RULE-)	27 July 2007
3	"Day 3: -Answer-"; Transliteration: "Muika Me: Asa -ANSWER-" (Japanese: 三日目：あさ-ANSWER-)	25 September 2007

=== Novel ===
A 238-page novel titled Thus Love Froze — ICE (かくて愛は凍りついた―ICE, Kakute Ai wa Kōritsuita ― ICE) and written by Yasushi Hirano was published on 20 February 2007 by Fujimi Shobo.

== Reception ==
Theron Martin of the Anime News Network called the series "fairly obscure," saying that while it has "intriguing ideas" in its artistry and story, it suffers from a "crippling lack of internal logic." Martin also criticized the series for being "all over the place," not having consistent "visual quality," while he praised the music score.
