= Nakamura Shidō II =

Japanese actor (born 1972)

Shidō Nakamura II
- 二代目中村獅童
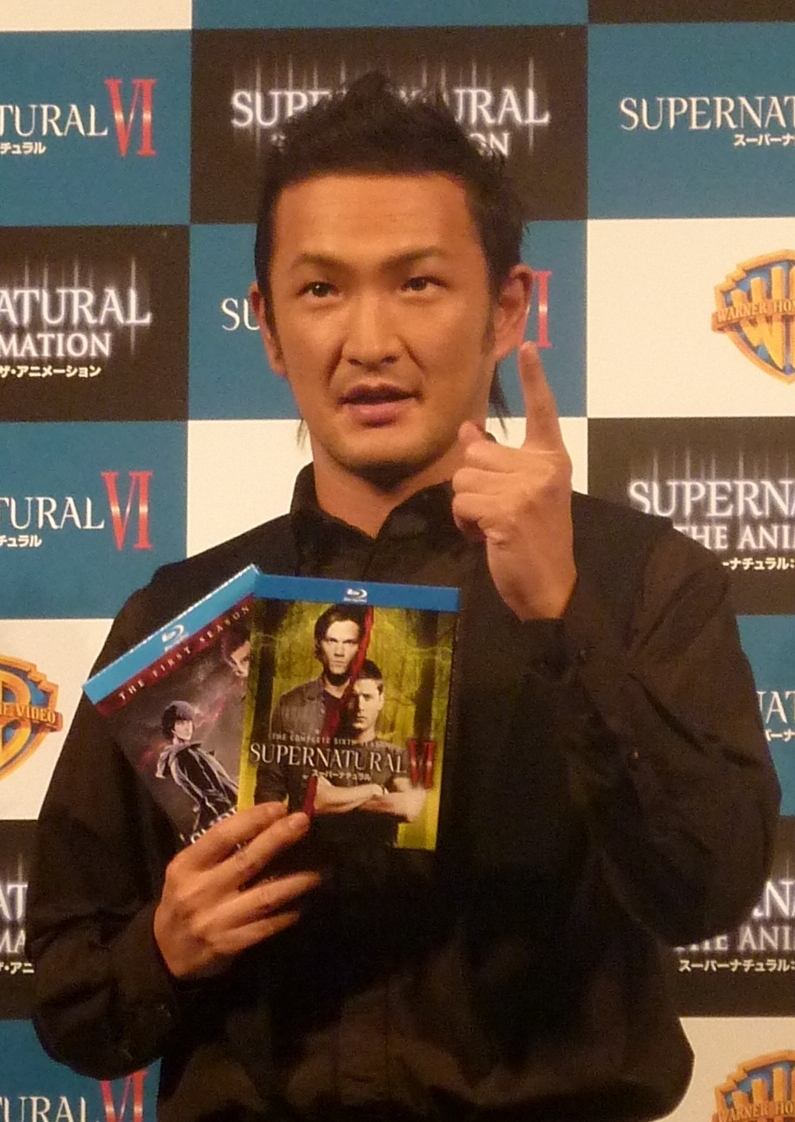
- Nakamura in 2010
- Born: Mikihiro Ogawa; 14 September 1972 (age 53); Tokyo, Japan
- Occupations: Kabuki and film actor
- Years active: 1989–present
- Notable credit(s): Ryuk in Death Note, Dragon in Ping Pong
- Spouses: Yūko Takeuchi (m. 2005; div. 2008) Saori Adachi (m. 2015)
- Children: 3
- Father: Nakamura Shidō I
- Relatives: Nakamura Karoku I (great-great-grandfather); Nakamura Karoku III (great-grandfather); Nakamura Tokizō III (grandfather); Yorozuya Kinnosuke (uncle); Nakamura Kashō II (uncle); Nakamura Tokizō IV (uncle); Nakamura Tokizō V (cousin); Nakamura Matagorō III (cousin); Nakamura Karoku V (cousin); Nakamura Kinnosuke II (cousin); Nakamura Baishi IV (cousin); Nakamura Mantarō (cousin); Nakamura Kashō IV (cousin); Nakamura Tanenosuke (cousin); Nakamura Yonekichi V (cousin); Nakamura Ryūnosuke (cousin); Nakamura Hayato I (cousin); Nakamura Tanetarō V (cousin); Nakamura Hidenosuke (cousin)
- Website: http://www.shidou.jp/

Mikihiro Ogawa (小川 幹弘, Ogawa Mikihiro; born 14 September 1972), better known by the stage name Shidō Nakamura II (二代目 中村 獅童, Nidaime Nakamura Shidō), is a Japanese kabuki and film actor.

== Life ==
Born in Tokyo, the son of kabuki actor Nakamura Shidō I, young Nakamura made his kabuki debut at the age of eight. He took the name Shidō the following year, following his father's retirement. Twenty-one years later, despite being a relative latecomer to the silver screen, the 30-year-old Kabuki actor was in his first film, Ping Pong (2002), in which he portrayed a skin-headed, demonically intense table tennis champion nicknamed Dragon. His film debut won Nakamura a Best Newcomer award at the 2003 Japanese Academy Awards. Since then, Nakamura has starred in a string of high-profile movies as well as TV dramas.

In May 2017, he announced that he will take a hiatus for his lung cancer treatment.

== Career ==
Nakamura came to international attention in 2004 after starring in the highly successful romance film Ima, Ai ni Yukimasu (Be With You) with Yūko Takeuchi, the two stars playing a couple separated by death. The two married after filming was complete, on 10 May 2005, and eventually divorced on 29 February 2008.

In the Hong Kong/China martial arts movie Fearless starring international kung fu star Jet Li, and set in 1910s Imperial China, Nakamura plays a Japanese martial artist who is Jet Li's final opponent. He also starred in Clint Eastwood's Letters from Iwo Jima.

Nakamura is the voice of Yoshitaka Mine, Chairman of the Hakuho Clan in Yakuza 3 (released in Japan as Like a Dragon 3 (龍が如く3, "Ryū ga Gotoku 3").

== Filmography ==
=== Films ===
Year	English title	Role	Notes	Ref.
2002	Ping Pong	Dragon		
2003	Like Asura	Shizuo Katsumata		
2003	Iden & Tity	Johnny		
2004	Be With You	Takumi	Lead role	
2004	One Piece: Curse of the Sacred Sword	Saga (voice)		
2004	Akasen	Izō	Lead role	
2004	My Lover Is a Sniper: The Movie	Fan Huoqing		
2005	Yamato	Mamoru Uchida		
2005	All About My Dog	Kentaro Yamada		
2005	The Neighbor No. Thirteen	No. 13	Lead role	
2005	One Stormy Night	Gabu (voice)		
2006	Letters from Iwo Jima	Lieutenant Ito	American film	
2006	Fearless	Anno Tanaka		
2006	Death Note	Ryuk (voice)		
2006	Honey and Clover	Repairer		
2006	Death Note 2: The Last Name	Ryuk (voice)		
2007	GeGeGe no Kitaro	Great Tengu Judge		
2007	Cha Cha, The Heavenly Woman	Tokugawa Ieyasu		
2008	Red Cliff	Gan Xing	Chinese film	
2008	Pokémon: Giratina & the Sky Warrior	Zero (voice)		
2008	L: Change the World	Ryuk (voice)		
2008	Ichi	Banki		
2009	Silver Rain	Shoji Iwai		
2010	Leonie	Yone Noguchi		
2011	Ninja Kids!!!	Rantaro's father		
2011	Hard Romantic-er	Takagi		
2013	Gatchaman	Iriya	Special appearance	
2013	Tenshin	Taikan Yokoyama		
2014	Silver Spoon	Miyuki Nakajima		
2015	Furiko	Daisuke Hasegawa	Lead role	
2015	Terminal	Ichiryū Ōshita		
2016	Twisted Justice	Kuroiwa		
2016	Death Note: Light Up the New World	Ryuk (voice)		
2018	The Blood of Wolves	Takafumi Kōsaka		
2020	Mio's Cookbook	Mataji		
2020	Signal 100	Shimobe		
2021	Character	Makabe		
2021	Last of the Wolves	Takafumi Kōsaka		
2023	The Village	Mitsuyoshi Ōhashi		
2023	Monster	Kiyotaka		
2023	Kubi	Naniwa Mosuke		
2023	Lumberjack the Monster	Takeshi Kenmochi		
2024	Hakkenden: Fiction and Reality	Ichikawa Danjūrō VII		
2024	Broken Rage			
2026	Street Kingdom			
2026	This Is I			
2026	The Mouths	Kusakabe		

=== TV series ===
- Taiga dramas
  - Kasuga no Tsubone (1989), Inaba Masasada
  - Mōri Motonari (1997), Amago Yoshihisa
  - Musashi (2003), Tokugawa Hidetada
  - Shinsengumi! (2004), Takimoto Sutesuke
  - Yae's Sakura (2013), Sagawa Kanbei
  - Idaten (2019), Sanetsugu Kanakuri
  - The 13 Lords of the Shogun (2022), Kajiwara Kagetoki
- Kisarazu Cat's Eye (2002)
- HR (2003)
- Akai Tsuki (2004), Himuro Keisuke
- Death Note (2006)
- Tenka Souran (2006)
- Shinjitsu no Shuki BC-kyu Senpan Kato Tetsutaro: Watashi wa Kai ni Naritai (2007)
- Ushi ni Negai wo: Love & Farm (2007)
- Sexy Voice and Robo (2007, ep1 and 11)
- Ri Kouran (2007)
- Wachigaiya Itosato (2007)
- Nikutai no Mon (2008)
- Kiri no Hi (2008)
- Untouchable (2009), Kusuda Makoto
- Mori no Asagao (2010, ep1)
- Totto TV (2016), Kiyoshi Atsumi
- Death Note: New Generation (2016), Ryuk (voice)
- Bones of Steel (2020), Gorō Nishida
- Ohsama Sentai King-Ohger (2024), Causus Husty, Reiniol Husty
- Shadows of the Ten Ninja (2026), Hattori Hanzo

=== Japanese dub ===
- The Amazing Spider-Man 2 as Max Dillon / Electro (Jamie Foxx)
- Spider-Man: No Way Home as Max Dillon / Electro (Jamie Foxx)
- Venom as Venom (Tom Hardy)
- Venom: Let There Be Carnage as Venom (Tom Hardy)
- Venom: The Last Dance as Venom (Tom Hardy)

=== Video games ===
- Yakuza 3 (2009), as Yoshitaka Mine
- Like a Dragon: Ishin! (2014), as Hijikata Toshizō
- Yakuza Kiwami 3 & Dark Ties (2026), as Yoshitaka Mine
