= Fumihiko Sori =

Japanese film director and film producer (born 1964)

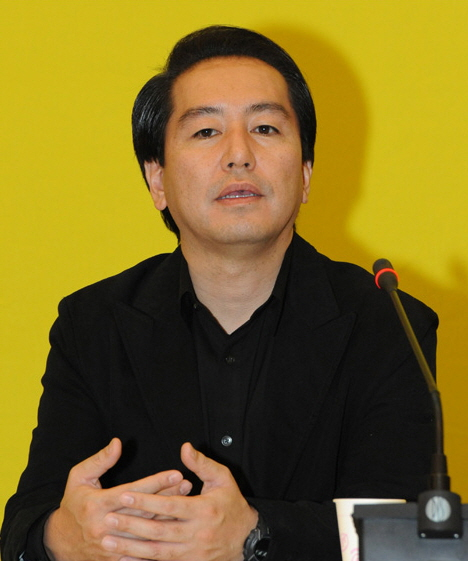
- Born: Fumihiko Sori; May 17, 1964 (age 62); Osaka, Japan

Fumihiko Sori (曽利 文彦) is a Japanese film director and film producer. He received a nomination for the 'Best Director' prize at the Japanese Academy Awards for his directing debut, Ping Pong.

== Filmography ==
=== Director ===
- 2002 Ping Pong
- 2007 Vexille
- 2008 Ichi
- 2009 To
- 2011 Tomorrow's Joe
- 2012 Dragon Age: Dawn of the Seeker
- 2017 Fullmetal Alchemist
- 2022 Fullmetal Alchemist: Revenge of Scar
- 2022 Fullmetal Alchemist: The Final Alchemy
- 2024 Hakkenden: Fiction and Reality
- 2027 Darwin's Game

=== Producer ===
- 2004 Appleseed

=== Visual effects supervisor ===
- 1998 Andromedia
- 1999 Himitsu
- 2000 Keizoku

== Awards ==
- Awards of the Japanese Academy 2002 Best Director
- Mainichi Film Concours 2002 Technical Achievement
- Yokohama Film Festival 2002 Best New Director
