= Ira Ishida =

Japanese novelist and TV commentator (born 1960)

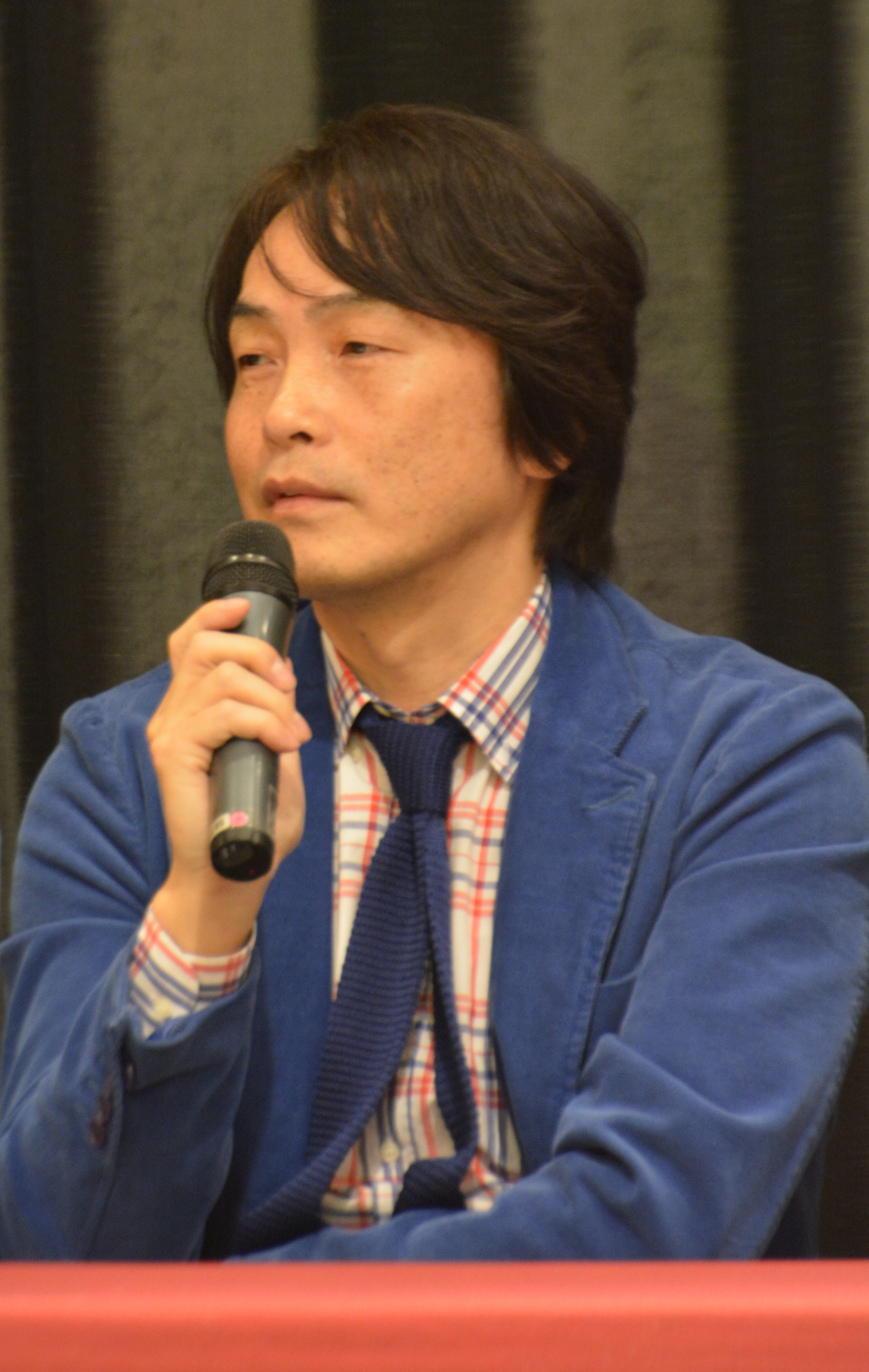
- Born: Shoichi Ishidaira; March 8, 1960 (age 66); Tokyo, Japan

Ira Ishida (石田 衣良, Ishida Ira; born March 8, 1960) is a Japanese novelist and TV commentator.

After graduating from Seikei University, he worked for a number of different advertising production companies and as a freelance copywriter. In 1997, he published his first short story collection, Ikebukuro West Gate Park, which won the 36th All Yomimono New Mystery Writer's Prize. In 2003, he won the Naoki Prize for 4teen.

His novels describe the culture of young people in Japan, particularly young women and otaku without a college education. Many of his works have been adapted for manga and television. As an actor, he made his first appearance in a leading role in the 2006 film Love My Life.

Ishida's pen name, Ishida Ira, was derived by splitting his real family name Ishidaira.

== Works in English translation ==
Novel

- Call Boy (original title: Shōnen), trans. Lamar Stone (Shueisha English Edition, 2013)

Short story

- Ikebukuro West Gate Park (Digital Geishas and Talking Frogs: The Best 21st Century Short Stories from Japan, Cheng & Tsui Company, 2011)

== Awards and nominations ==
- 1997 - All Yomimono New Mystery Writer's Prize: Ikebukuro West Gate Park (short story)
- 2001 - Nominee for Naoki Prize: Call Boy
- 2002 - Nominee for Naoki Prize: Kotsuon: Ikebukuro West Gate Park 3
- 2003 - Naoki Prize: 4teen

== Main works ==
=== Ikebukuro West Gate Park ===
- Short story collections
  - Ikebukuro West Gate Park (池袋ウエストゲートパーク), 1998
    - Ikebukuro West Gate Park (池袋ウエストゲートパーク)
    - Ekisaitaburu bōi [Excitable boy] (エキサイタブルボーイ)
    - Oashisu no koibito (オアシスの恋人)
    - Sanshain-dōri shiviru wō (サンシャイン通り内戦)
  - Ikebukuro West Gate Park 2: Shōnen keisūki (池袋ウエストゲートパーク2 少年計数機), 2000
  - Ikebukuro West Gate Park 3: Kotsuon (池袋ウエストゲートパーク3 骨音), 2002
  - Ikebukuro West Gate Park 4: Denshi no hoshi (池袋ウエストゲートパーク4 電子の星), 2003
  - Ikebukuro West Gate Park 5: Han-jisatsu kurabu (池袋ウエストゲートパーク5 反自殺クラブ), 2005
  - Ikebukuro West Gate Park 6: Haiiro no Pītāpan (池袋ウエストゲートパーク6 灰色のピーターパン), 2006
  - Ikebukuro West Gate Park 7: G bōizu fuyu sensō (池袋ウエストゲートパーク7 Gボーイズ冬戦争), 2007
  - Ikebukuro West Gate Park 8: Hiseiki rejisutansu (池袋ウエストゲートパーク8 非正規レジスタンス), 2008
  - Ikebukuro West Gate Park 9: Doragon tiāzu Ryūrui (池袋ウエストゲートパーク9 ドラゴン・ティアーズ 龍涙), 2009
  - Ikebukuro West Gate Park 10: Puraido [Pride] (池袋ウエストゲートパーク10 PRIDE), 2010

=== Call Boy series ===
- Shōnen (娼年), 2001 (Call Boy, Shueisha English Edition, 2013)
- Seinen (逝年), 2008
- Call Boy 3, 2018

=== Standalone novels ===
- Utsukushii Kodomo (うつくしい子ども), 1999
- Enjeru [Angel] (エンジェル), 1999
- Nami no ue no majutsushi (波のうえの魔術師), 2001
- Burū tawā [Blue Tower] (ブルータワー), 2004
- Akihabara@DEEP (アキハバラ@DEEP), 2004
- Fushichōshōnen (不死鳥少年), 2019

=== Short story collections ===
- Surō guddobai [Slow Good-bye] (スローグッドバイ), 2002
- 4teen (4TEEN), 2003

== TV and film adaptations ==
Japanese TV dramas

- Ikebukuro West Gate Park (TV series) (2000)
- 4teen (2004)
- Akihabara@DEEP (2006)

Japanese film

- Akihabara@DEEP (2006)
- Shōnen (娼年) (2018)
