= 6 Angels =

2002 film by Makoto Kobayashi

- 6 Angels (シックス・エンジェルズ)
- Original net animation
- Directed by: Makoto Kobayashi
- Produced by: Hiromi Chiba; Yasushi Akimoto
- Written by: Yasushi Hirano
- Music by: Masamichi Amano
- Studio: Arcturus
- Released: November 20, 2001 – July 6, 2002
- Runtime: 20 minutes (each)
- Episodes: 6

6 Angels (シックス・エンジェルズ) is a 2002 science fiction action anime ona series directed by Makoto Kobayashi, with scripts by Yasushi Hirano and story, layouts, and original concepts by Yasushi Akimoto.

== Background ==
Production began in 2000 with an original release expectation for January 2001. Character design was by Hiromi Kato and mechanical design was by Makoto Kobayashi. There are 6 chapters of uneven duration, originally released on the Internet as separate episodes, and the total running time is 100 minutes.

== Synopsis ==
The series is set in the near-future in a large underground prison at a former nuclear test site in Utah known as Neo Purgatory, where the characters of Maki (Fumiko Orikasa), Naomi (Michiko Neya), Doris (Akemi Okamura), Marilyn (Mayumi Asano), and Katherine (Yuri Shiratori) make up an all-female mercenary outfit called the "Guard of Rose" and acting as a guard patrol. The prisoners, many of whom are mutated by the ambient radiation, are left to their own devices, but a criminal known as Donn Canyon (Takeshi Watabe) and his family take control of the prison and declare war upon the world by gaining control of the American orbital nuclear missile platform and vowing the "purify the world with radiation" in a nuclear holocaust. After an abortive attempt by the United States and Soviet militaries to assault the prison, the Guard of Rose is tasked with infiltrating and defeating the Canyon family to preserve global peace.

== Cast ==
- Fumiko Orikasa as Maki Aoba
- Michiko Neya as Naomi Jones
- Akemi Okamura as Doris Nicholas
- Mayumi Asano as Marilyn Moreau
- Yuri Shiratori as Katherine Hook
- Takeshi Watabe as Donn G Canyon
- Daisuke Sakaguchi as Akira Canyon
- Hideyuki Umezu as Ed Canyon
- Bunkoh Ogata as Terry Canyon
- Akira Ishida as J C
- Kurumi Mamiya as Link
- Banjou Ginga as Giga
- Junko Noda as Tereshkova
- Katsumi Chou as President of the United States
- Katsuhiro Kitagawa as Premier of the Soviet Union
- Ken Narita as Mike
- Maria Kawamura as Angel
- Takehiro Murozono as First Lieutenant
- Tadahisa Saizen as Tower operator
- Daisuke Kishio as Boy
- Hirotoku Miyata as Leader of U.S. Personnel

== Critical reception ==
T.H.E.M. Anime Reviews felt that director Kobayashi Makoto and scriptwriter Akimoto Yasushi failed in their efforts to create a viewable series. Among the series' attributes that were panned were the background music sounding "eerily similar to the background of the Care Bears Movie, ethereal and fluffy and jarring and likely the result of a five-year-old banging on a synthesizer," the casting of Mamiya Kurumi as the mecha mascot, Link, who reminding the reviewer of Jar Jar Binks "but with a squeaky Japanese woman's voice," and otherwise talented actresses playing the voices of the Guard of Rose being "uniformly mediocre and less interesting than the girls of the Gall Force", and character designs being bad and characterizations worse. The reviewer ended his enumeration of multiple flaws by stating (sic) "This really IS the worst anime I've ever seen. 6 Angels has all the elements that could have made a great movie, except for the greatness."
