= Yuka Kosaka =

Japanese gravure idol and actress (born 1985)

- Born: June 27, 1985 (age 41); Kanagawa Prefecture, Japan
- Years active: 2004–2009, 2023–present
- Height: 169 cm (5 ft 7 in)
- Spouse: Rakuto Tochihara (m. 2022)

Yuka Kosaka (小阪由佳; こさか ゆか born June 27, 1985) is a Japanese gravure idol and actress. She was born in Izumi-ku, Yokohama, Kanagawa, Japan. She is also known as her nickname "Yuka-chin", and has starred in a number of TV dramas and films.

== Profile ==
Yuka made her debut in 2004 after winning the Grand Prix award in Miss Magazine 2004. After her first DVD peach went on sale on March 25, 2004, her DVDs have constantly produced. Yuka also became a frequent guest on Matthew’s Best Hit TV. In the fall of 2004, Yuka’s popularity rose when she became the campaign girl for the Japanese convenience store, Circle K Sunkus. Previously, she belongs in a Japanese entertainment company, A-team, in which a number of Japanese actresses and models are belonged including Aki Hoshino.

She suddenly retired from entertainment industry in 2009. During her retirement, she works at a nursery. She returned to entertainment industry in November 2023.

On January 6, 2022, she announced her marriage to a former actor Rakuto Tochihara.

== Filmography ==
Film
Year	Film	Role	Notes
2005	Gekijôban XXXHolic Manatsu no yoru no yume		voice
2005	Sutâraito		
2006	Akihabara@Deep	Akira	
2007	Kyonyu wo business ni shita otoko		
2007	Gakkô no kaidan	Chizuru Nakamura	
2007	Kûga no ori: Nami dai-42 zakkyobô		Video
2008	Urahara		
