= Inai Inai Baa! =

Japanese television series

- Japanese: いないいないばあっ!
- Genre: Children's television series
- Starring: Kanako Tahara (1996–1999); Rina Saitou (1999–2003); Fuuka Hara (2003–2007); Kotomi Kuga (2007–2011); Yuuna Sugiyama (2011–2015); Yuki Oosumi (2015–2019); Haruki Kuramochi (2019–2023); Oka Takeishi (2023–present)
- Country of origin: Japan
- Original language: Japanese

Production
- Running time: 15 min
- Production company: NHK

Original release
- Network: NHK Educational TV
- Release: 1 April 1996 – present

Related
- China: Yiyayiya; Vietnam: Ú Òa! Myanmar: Tu Tu Yay Wah

Inai Inai Baa! (Japanese: いないいないばあっ!, lit. 'Peekaboo!') is a Japanese children's TV program broadcast by NHK Educational TV for infants, toddlers, preschoolers, and kindergarteners (0–6 years old), consisting of gymnastics, songs, educations, etc. It first premiered on April 1, 1996.

== Overview ==
NHK's program for infants, which started broadcasting in 1996. The audience rating of NHK education as a children's program is the most popular program, following Okaasan to Issho and Miitsuketa!.

The program name "っ!" has the meaning of "full of energy".

The pilot version was broadcast on BS2 on January 15 and 16, 1996. Broadcasting began on NHK BS2 Television on April 1, 1996, and then on October 7, 1996, it moved to the current educational television frame. From April 5, 1999, there were two broadcasting systems, morning and evening.

Appearances are regular such as Wanwan, Sister (O-chan as of 2023), and Puppet (Poupo as of 2023). Up until now, elementary school girls have been appointed as sisters, and they have been replaced in four years (only the first three years). The puppets also change irregularly.

As of 2021, localized versions are being produced and broadcast in Shanghai (People's Republic of China), Vietnam and Myanmar.

In April 2026, the show celebrated its 30th anniversary.

== Characters ==
There is an amount of characters that appear in the show.

=== Puppets ===
==== Regular ====
Character name	Date	Description
Penta (ペンタ)	April 1, 1996 - April 4, 1997	A 5-sided star shaped creature with a green antenna that has buck teeth. In the pilot version, the puppeteer of Penta was visible until the regular broadcast. They graduated from the show just over a year later, and was the only character that did not appear in the 20th anniversary special in 2016.
Kuu (くぅ)	April 7, 1997 - April 4, 2003	A light pink cloud fairy with a green mohawk. In 2000, Dada, a new friend appeared along with Kuu. They both left in 2003.
Dada (ダーダ)	April 3, 2000 - April 4, 2003	A baby bird who only says 'dada'. They joined the show along with Kuu, before both graduating in 2003.
U-tan (うーたん)	April 7, 2003 - March 31, 2023	A fairy from the Land of Music, and has a lot of friends. Graduated from the show in March 2023, almost 20 years after they joined.
Poupo (ぽぅぽ)	April 3, 2023 - present	A baby with pompoms on the head, and loves being stroked gently.

==== Poupo's friends ====
Character name	Description
Maaru	Poupo's younger sibling. Often imitates Poupo.
Yaya	Poupo and Maaru's mother.
Otto	Calm and collects insects. An only child who is always with their beloved doll.
Chichi	
Nini	

== Songs ==
The many songs in the show is designed to be fun and exciting for babies and young children, and is only 1 to 2 minutes in length. Across the years, many well-known lyricists, composers, picture book authors, musicians and scriptwriters had contributed to adding songs into the show. In the beginning, the team behind the show were not intending to have songs by famous people, but would end up doing so as they were introduced by people involved in the program (e.g. lyricists). Gymnastics songs that play in every episode aired change every few years, and feature movements to help develop the infant mind.

There are also songs to teach about lifestyle habits (e.g. eating, brushing teeth, tidying up) in a puppet show. However, even if a girl is replaced, the videos are not replaced and are kept.

=== Normal songs ===
- Looks like something good will happen! (2022-)
- Fruits Purupuru (2025-)
- Maple Tree Song (2011-2023)
- Yaho☆ (2023-)
- Tetotetotetote (2019-2023, 2025-)

=== Lifestyle habits songs ===
- Ah, It's Delicious! () (2023-)

== Specials ==
=== 20th Anniversary Special! -Always Together!- ===
To celebrate the 20th anniversary of the show in April 2016, a 30-minute special was aired on January 2 of the same year (rebroadcasting on January 11). This featured many past segments making a return. Some of the special included a medley of gymnastics songs from the past, a felt puppet segment featuring puppets of past girls and characters from the show (excluding Penta), and the full version of the 20th anniversary song, Always Together (ずーっといっしょ). It was also released on DVD, Blu-ray and streaming services. Special messages and pictures from the past girls of the show were also released.
