= Yōsuke Kubozuka =

Japanese actor

- 窪塚洋介
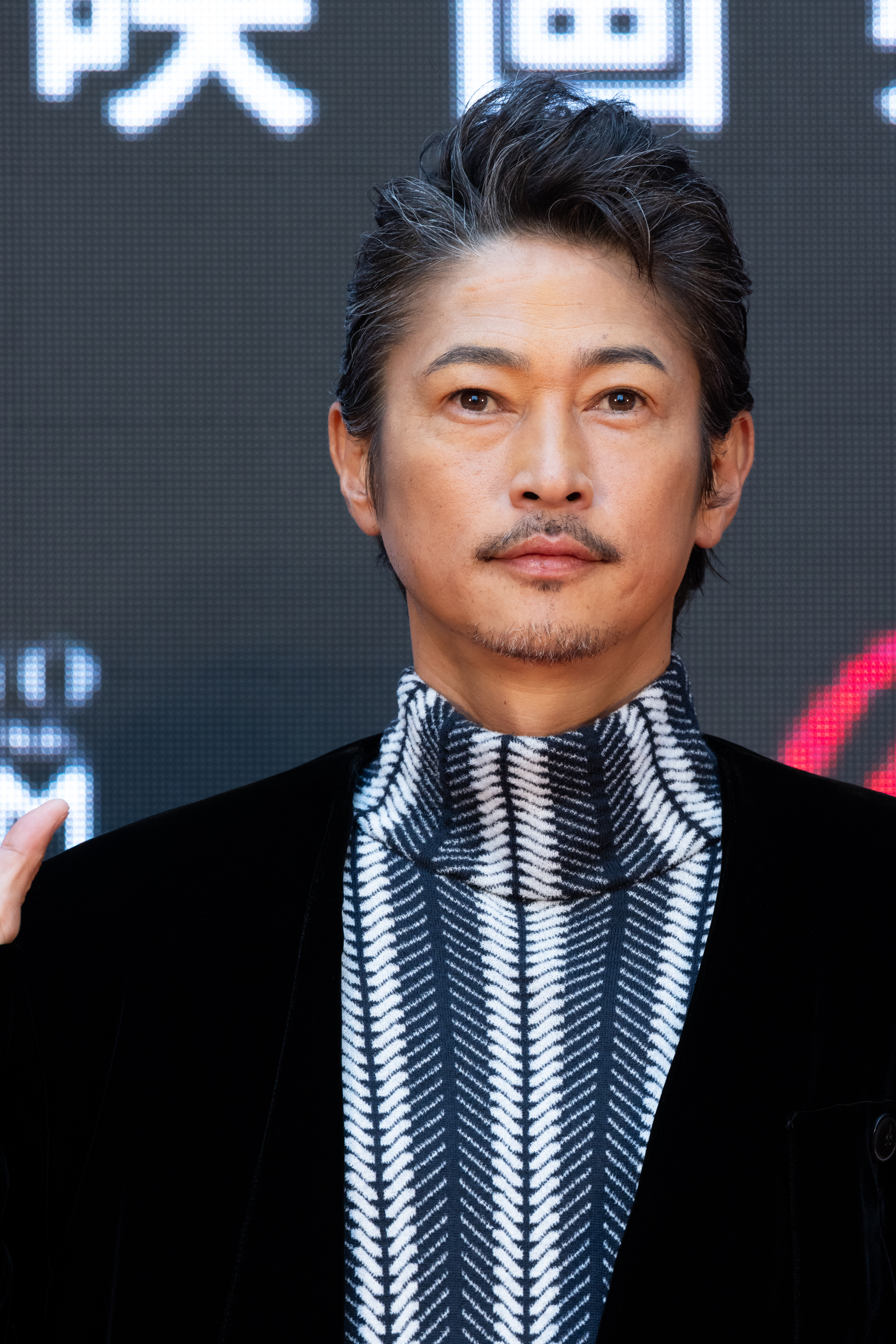
- Kubozuka at the 36th Tokyo International Film Festival in October 2024
- Born: 7 May 1979 (age 47); Yokosuka, Kanagawa, Japan
- Occupations: Actor, musician
- Years active: 1994–present
- Spouses: Unknown (m. 2003; div. 2012); PINKY (m. 2015)
- Children: 2, including Airu Kubozuka
- Website: www.manjiline-amatorecordz.com

Yōsuke Kubozuka (窪塚 洋介, Kubozuka Yōsuke; born May 7, 1979 in Yokosuka, Kanagawa) is a Japanese actor and musician.

== Career ==
Yosuke Kubozuka has been a model for many magazines and TV commercials before starting out his acting career where he debuted in a 1995 TV crime drama Kindaichi Case Files. In 1998, he starred in the TV series GTO as the role of an honors student, Yoshito Kikuchi. In 2000, he starred in Ikebukuro West Gate Park along with Tomoya Nagase, Ken Watanabe (The Last Samurai, Memoirs of a Geisha, Inception) and Tomohisa Yamashita (Nobuta wo Produce, Kurosagi, Operation Love, Code Blue). In this drama he plays the role of "King" of the G-Boys, Takashi Ando.

In 2001, he starred in Strawberry on the Shortcake along with other popular young artists such as Hideaki Takizawa and Kyoko Fukada. In the drama he took the role of being Kyoko Fukada's first love.

In October of that same year, he starred in Go (directed by Isao Yukisada), which tells the story of a Zainichi chosenjin teenager who falls in love with a Japanese girl, was officially released. For his performance in this role, Kubozuka took home two awards (Outstanding Performance by an Actor in a Leading Role and Newcomer of the Year) at Japan Academy Film Prize. Kubozuka also appeared in Mr. Children's 2002 "Kimi ga Suki" music video, which won MTV Video Music Award Japan for Video of the Year in 2002 (Mr. Children also nominated in Best Group Category but losing to Backstreet Boys).

Since then, Kubozuka took on projects starring in Ping Pong, Kyoki no Sakura as well as Samurai Resurrection.

He also appeared in films such as Tokyo Island, Monsters Club, Helter Skelter, and the 2016 remake of Silence directed by Martin Scorsese.

Kubozuka has also been pursuing his career as a reggae musician by the name 'Manji Line' (卍 LINE) since 2006.

== Personal life ==
Kubozuka graduated from Kanagawa Prefectural Yokosuka High School. He married a non-celebrity woman in May 2003 and had one son. In 2004, he survived after falling 26 metres from his 9th floor apartment. On July 12, 2012, Kubozuka announced through his official website that he had divorced his wife a month earlier, and that he has official custody of his son. Kubozuka remarried in December 2015, a daughter was born in 2017.

== Filmography ==
=== Films ===
Year	Title	Role	Notes	Ref.
2001	Go	Sugihara	Lead role	
2015	Deadman Inferno	Shirakawa		
2016	Silence	Kichijiro	American film	
2017	Alley Cat	Hideaki Asa / Maru		
2019	The First Supper	Shun		
2020	Mio's Cookbook	Komatsubara		
2021	First Love	Gamon Makabe		
2021	DIVOC-12		Anthology film	
2021	Go Seppuku Yourselves			
2023	Sin Clock	Shinji Takagi		
2023	Home Sweet Home			
2023	Phoenix: Reminiscence of Flower	George (voice)		
2023	Knuckle Girl	Shiraishi	South Korean-Japanese film	
2025	Frontline: Yokohama Bay	Yukiyoshi Sendo		
2025	The Killer Goldfish			
2025	Transcending Dimensions	Rosuke Yamanaka		

=== Television ===
Year	Title	Role	Notes	Ref.
1998	Great Teacher Onizuka (GTO)	Yoshito Kikuchi		
2000	Match Making	Junichi Ohata		
2000	Ikebukuro West Gate Park (IWGP)	Takashi Ando, G-Boys King		
2023	Phoenix: Eden17	George (voice)		
2024	Tokyo Vice	Naoki Hayama	Season 2	
2024	GTO Revival	Yoshito Kikuchi		
2026	GTO 2026	Yoshito Kikuchi		

=== Stage Play ===
Year	Title	Role	Notes	Ref.
2015–16	The Teachings of Kaiju		Lead role	

== Awards and nominations ==
Year	Award	Category	Work(s)	Result	Ref.
2001	26th Hochi Film Awards	Best Actor	Go!	Won	
2002	25th Japan Academy Film Prize	Best Actor	Go!	Won	
2002	25th Japan Academy Film Prize	Newcomer of the Year	Go!	Won	
2002	23rd Yokohama Film Festival	Best Actor	Go!	Won	
