= Yuuna Sugiyama =

Japanese child actress (born 2002)

- 杉山 優奈
- Born: December 20, 2002 (age 23); Kanagawa Prefecture, Japan
- Occupation: Child actress
- Years active: 2009 -
- Agent: Nichien Production
- Known for: Inai Inai Baa!
- Website: Official profile

Yuuna Sugiyama (杉山 優奈, Sugiyama Yūna; born December 20, 2002) is a Japanese child actress, who also records on Universal Music Japan.

== Biography ==
Sugiyama was born in Kanagawa Prefecture, Japan. In 2009, Sugiyama debuted on the Tokyo Broadcasting System drama, Kochira Katsushika-ku Kameari Kōen-mae Hashutsujo.

From March 28, 2011, to March 27, 2015, she became the fifth-generation One-san in the NHK Educational TV series, Inai Inai Baa!. Sugiyama is now in Wan Wan Wonderland from April 2015.

Her favorite food is Inari roll and sushi. Sugiyama had a difficulty with swimming. On 2013, she wanted to practice riding a bike.

On September 22, 2015, Sugiyama's CD debut was "Kama tte Yo! Ne".

== Filmography ==
=== TV series ===
Year	Title	Network	Notes
2011	Inai Inai Baa!	NHK E TV	
2015	Inai Inai Baa! Atsumare! Wan Wan Wonderland	NHK E TV	

=== Drama ===
Year	Title	Role	Network	Notes
2009	Kochira Katsushika-ku Kameari Kōen-mae Hashutsujo		TBS	Episode 7
2010	Code Blue	Miku Ueno	Fuji TV	Season 2
2010	Ai wa Mieru: Zenmō Fūfu ni Yadotta Chīsana Inochi	Satoko Tatemichi (child)	Fuji TV	
2011	Kokuhatsu: Kokusen Bengo Hito	Haruko Nakazato	TV Asahi	
2011	Castle of Sand	Taeko Yoshimura	TV Asahi	

=== Films ===
Title	Notes
Tomato no Shizuku	

== Discography ==
=== Singles ===
Year	Title	Notes	Ref.
2015	"Kama tte Yo! Ne"		
2015	"Koi Suru Fortune Cookie"		
2015	"Odoru Pompokolin"		
2015	"Attakain Dakaraa"		
