= Rhapsody in August =

1991 film by Akira Kurosawa

- Theatrical release poster
- Directed by: Akira Kurosawa
- Screenplay by: Akira Kurosawa
- Based on: Nabe no Naka by Kiyoko Murata
- Produced by: Hisao Kurosawa
- Starring: Sachiko Murase; Hidetaka Yoshioka; Richard Gere
- Cinematography: Takao Saito; Shoji Ueda
- Music by: Shin’ichirō Ikebe
- Distributed by: Shochiku
- Release date: 25 May 1991 (Japan)
- Running time: 98 minutes
- Country: Japan
- Languages: Japanese and English
- Box office: ¥820 million (Japan rentals) $9 million (overseas)

Rhapsody in August (Japanese: 八月の狂詩曲, Hepburn: Hachigatsu no Rapusodī) (Note: The Japanese title (八月の狂詩曲 Hachigatsu no Rapusodī) is also known as Hachigatsu no Kyōshikyoku. "狂詩曲" is usually pronounced "kyōshikyoku." When the film was released in Japan, the furigana "rapusodī (ラプソディー)" was added to the word "狂詩曲" contrary to the standard usage of Japanese.) is a 1991 Japanese drama film by Akira Kurosawa based on the novel Nabe no Naka by Kiyoko Murata. Starring Sachiko Murase, Hidetaka Yoshioka, and Richard Gere, the story centers on an elderly hibakusha, who lost her husband in the 1945 atomic bombing of Nagasaki, as she cares for her four grandchildren over the summer. She learns of a long-lost brother, Suzujiro, living in Hawaii who wants her to visit him before he dies. Thematic analyses of the film focus primarily on the concern of the nuclear bomb and its remembrance; examining how the use of silence and music have been used to express its horror. Additional focus has looked at the place of family and the role of nature in the film's imagery.

Produced by Shochiku and Kurosawa Production on a budget of $10,000,000 ($24.6 million in 2025), production finished quickly despite logistical problems surrounding Gere's schedule, and difficulty with shooting a train of ants. Initial previews of the film by foreign reporters were often negative in tone, and Kurosawa faced accusations of anti-Americanism; some felt the film did not properly contextualize the nuclear attacks by failing to mention Japanese aggression. Reporters were particularly upset with a scene where Gere's character appears to apologize for the nuclear attacks, whereas most scholarly readings tend to view the scene as a reconciliation among family members without any specific political meaning. Released in Japan on 25 May 1991 to mixed reviews, the film won several Japan Academy Film Prizes. Rhapsody had its Midwestern premiere in Saint Paul, Minnesota, where funds were raised to help donate an American sculpture to Nagasaki Peace Park.

== Plot ==
Kane (an elderly hibakusha whose husband was killed in the atomic bombing of Nagasaki) has her grandchildren visiting her at her rural home in Kyūshū one summer while her children visit Kane's brother, Suzujiro, in Hawaii. The grandchildren receive a letter from their parents urging them to convince their grandmother to visit her brother in Hawaii, however, Kane can not recall Suzujiro's name or face. On a visit to Nagasaki, the grandchildren go to the spot where their grandfather was killed in 1945 and become more aware of their grandparents' experiences. They walk around the city to learn more about the event and visit Nagasaki Peace Park, whereupon they discover there is no monument from America to commemorate the civilian deaths. They return that evening and discuss the day's events. They criticize their parents' attitude towards their Hawaiian family while failing to consider Kane. Kane overhears them and tells them that she is not bitter, and states that she does not particularly like or dislike America. She tells her grandchildren about her siblings, including one who eloped with his employer's daughter to live in the forest.

The following day the elder two grandchildren visit the trees where Kane's brother lived, but return after feeling unsettled by the atmosphere. When they return they find Kane sitting in silence with an old friend, Kane explains that they both lost their husbands in the bombing and so do not need to exchange words to understand each other. The family send a telegram asking Suzujiro to confirm the names of his siblings so Kane can be sure of his identity. That evening, Kane tells the grandchildren about another brother who spent his time drawing pictures of eyes, which the children compare to the eye of a snake and Kane to the bomb's mushroom cloud. The American family confirm the siblings' names and Kane decides to go to Hawaii after a memorial service for the bomb victims on August 9. The parents return home, enamored with the wealth of their American cousins, but are upset that Kane had written to her relatives about the death of her husband at Nagasaki, feeling that it would create friction within the family. They receive a message telling them that Clark, Kane's nephew, will visit Nagasaki, which the family misinterpret as their cousins cutting them off. Clark travels to Japan and surprises them by wanting to apologize to Kane and visit the site of his uncle's death.

Clark visits the site and witnesses a local commemoration of the bombing. After Clark apologizes to Kane, the two reconcile. He joins Kane at a local temple for the memorial service of her husband's death. He and the grandchildren observe the Buddhist ceremony before they turn their attention to a train of ants climbing over a rose. While spending time with his family, Clark suddenly receives a telegram telling him that his father Suzujiro, Kane's brother, has died in Hawaii; he is forced to return there for his father's funeral. Kane feels regret that she did not make the decision to visit her brother sooner. Kane's mental health and memory begin to falter. She begins to show signs of odd behavior by laying out her husband's old clothing. When a storm strikes she tries to protect her grandchildren by covering them with sheets, which confuses her younger family members. As the storm intensifies again, Kane becomes more disoriented and mistakenly confuses the storm for the atmospheric disturbance caused by the bombing. In her disoriented state, Kane decides that she must save her husband from the impending atomic blast. She takes her small umbrella and walks into the storm to warn her husband, while her family chase after her.

== Cast ==
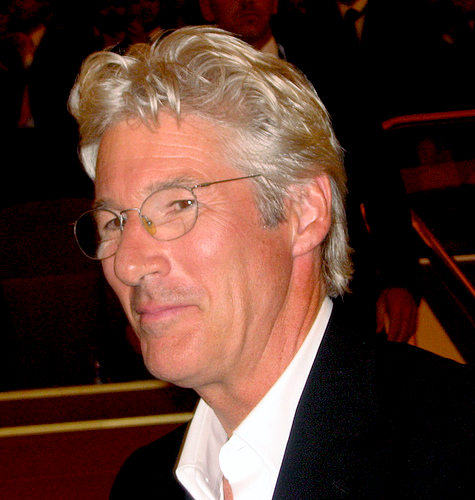
Gere in October 2007

- Sachiko Murase as Kane (the grandmother)
- Hidetaka Yoshioka as Tateo (Yoshie's son)
- Tomoko Otakara as Tami (Tadao's daughter)
- Mieko Suzuki as Minako (Yoshie's daughter)
- Mitsunori Isaki as Shinjiro (Tadao's son)
- Hisashi Igawa as Tadao (Kane's son)
- Toshie Negishi as Yoshie (Kane's daughter)
- Choichiro Kawarazaki as Noboru (Yoshie's husband)
- Narumi Kayashima as Machiko (Tadao's wife)
- Richard Gere as Clark (Kane's nephew)

== Production ==
=== Development and pre-production ===
Based on the novel Nabe no Naka by Kiyoko Murata, Kurosawa read the book and started development on the film during the production of Dreams (1990). He wrote the screenplay by himself and made several changes to the original story. The novel focuses on the perspective of the grandmother who becomes increasingly unable to tell the difference between illusions and reality. Finishing the script in about fifteen days, Kurosawa decided to change the location of the story to the outskirts of Nagasaki, making the protagonist's deceased husband a victim of the atomic bomb dropped on the city in 1945. Filmmaker Ishiro Honda also made some uncredited contributions to the script. With a budget of $10,000,000 ($24.6 million in 2025), Rhapsody in August was produced by Kurosawa Production and financed by Shochiku and Feature Film Enterprise No. 2 (an investment partnership of at least eighteen companies, including Imagica and Hakuhodo). It marked Kurosawa's first film produced solely by Japanese studios since Dodes'ka-den (1970).

When she received the script for the film, Sachiko Murase was initially reluctant to accept, but was impressed by Kurosawa's understanding of the suffering inflicted by both sides of the Second World War and considered his attitude and direction to be compassionate and gentle. Despite harboring reservations about the difference between herself and the characterization of Kane, she did not ask to change the character's personality. Richard Gere was cast after Kurosawa asked if he was interested in the role of Clark at a party that celebrated Kurosawa's birthday and 1990 Academy Award. Kurosawa was struck by his interest in Asia and practice of Lamaism; when he was told about the role, Gere offered to act in the film for free but accepted the offer of a minor fee. Originally Gere had prosthetic eyes made to look half-Japanese, but Kurosawa decided on a simple makeup job. Gere practiced Japanese with a dialogue coach, and used a tape provided for him by a friend who was bilingual.

=== Production ===
Location shooting in Nagasaki began on 22 August 1990. The film's climax at the elementary school with Richard Gere was filmed over three days from 24 August. That summer was especially hot, and Kurosawa filmed multiple retakes, but Gere's schedule made it difficult to finish early. Additions to the script were made during filming, and Kurosawa increased Gere's role, although the actor's contract was only for three weeks. Nearly 100 staff members travelled across Japan, causing logistical problems with accommodation and transportation as they were filming during the Obon holiday.

To film a scene that showed ants marching in a straight line, Kurosawa employed a professor from the Kyoto Institute of Technology to create a pheromone trail leading to Gere's feet. Working with assistant director Toru Tanaka, they encountered difficulties when the ants continually fanned out in different directions instead of following the trail. Realizing the soil was absorbing the pheromones too quickly, the production team replaced, dried, and remixed the soil with cement. Later scenes involving the use of ants also required a large amount of effort, with Tanaka spending three days on a shot composed of the ants climbing a rose bush. According to Donald Richie, the scene could not be completed because the ants were at the wrong altitude, and was only finished after the crew moved the location of the shoot from Gotemba to sea-level Kyoto.

Kurosawa told Gabriel García Márquez in 1990:

I have not filmed shockingly realistic scenes which would prove to be unbearable and yet would not explain in and of themselves the horror of the drama. What I would like to convey is the type of wounds the atomic bomb left in the heart of our people, and how they gradually began to heal.

Whereas before he worked with composers to make original music, in his final films Kurosawa began using pre-existing music that played outside of the narrative world. Production finished quickly, and the film was ready to view three months before Shochiku's scheduled release date.

== Themes ==
=== Family and generations ===
In Rhapsody in August, Kane is shown to model behavior for her grandchildren whereas her own children view her cynically as being old-fashioned. Professor of Japanese and cinema Linda Ehrlich sees the film's perspective as one that focuses on the extremes of age while reducing the middle generation (who were born and raised during the war and its aftermath) to caricature. She comments that Kurosawa connects children and the elderly to an idea of innocence which is associated with the theme of nature. To film scholar Stephen Prince, the growing connection of the younger generation to Kane advances their historical understanding and reconciliation, whereas Kane's assimilated Hawaiian older brother is thematically forgotten and the middle generation are condemned for their opportunism. Historian David Conrad writes of the connection between the generations and how Clark acts as a medium for growing international cultural exchange. Clark is able to play with his Japanese nieces and nephews, and shames his cousins by freely offering the wealth they sought to cajole from him. Because he is a nisei (second generation) hāfu, he represents a possibility for a new geopolitical and familial relationship in a world no longer bound by the framework of the Second World War and Cold War.

Mitsuhiro Yoshimoto, in his study of Kurosawa's filmography, states that "the present is haunted by the past." He examines how Kane recounts her youngest brother's elopement and subsequent life in the forest near a pair of cedar trees struck and twisted by lightning which she describes as appearing like "two lovers that had committed suicide" so evocatively that prompts her grandchildren to go searching for them. The grandchildren also tease one another and when Shinjiro is told he looks like Kane's youngest brother, he later dresses up like a kappa based on another story Kane relates about him. Because of Kane's self-distancing from her memories, she only remembers just prior to his death that her older brother moved to Hawaii. To Yoshimoto, the death of Kane's brother causes a traumatic reaction where her memories of both her husband and Suzujiro become confused with each other. Prince summarily describes the film's politics as metaphorical for being contained within the family, and not focused on the broader history of the war. Film scholar James Goodwin argues that the introduction of Clark, and his request to view the site where his uncle lost his life to the bomb, reintegrates the family unit and connects them to a social and psychological past.

=== Death and memory of the atomic bomb ===
In Donald Richie's The Films of Akira Kurosawa, the author considers Kurosawa's aim to have been for "the viewer to remember and then forgive" the dropping of the atomic bomb. However, he writes that the film's assignment of blame for the destruction caused by the atomic bomb is too simplistic for the subject matter. Similarly, Ehrlich believes that Rhapsody distorts the form of innocence by undermining its sincerity with simplicity, writing that unaddressed complexities of wartime suffering are not adequately expressed—and so detract from—the suffering inflicted by the atomic bomb. Prince refers to the film's politics as "curiously evasive". Much of the film's dramatic narrative occurs off-screen (e.g. the death of Suzujiro, the parents' trip to Hawaii), which he indicates is also Kurosawa's approach to the history of the atomic bomb due to the fact that it had already occurred. As a result, everything is left to recollection which deprioritizes action in favor of memory. Yoshimoto, in writing on Rhapsody's political statements on the atomic bomb, considers the film's question of commemoration. He writes that, while the children's perspectives on why America had not donated a memorial to Nagasaki Peace Park are not treated unequivocally, it is not a historical distortion to question why America had not done so.

The depiction of the eye represents the blast of the atomic bomb, described as "omnipotent" by Galbraith, and "cosmic" by Goodwin.

In The Warrior's Camera, Prince identifies Rhapsody in August within Kurosawa's late filmography as a form of "psychobiography". On this theme, Conrad notes Kurosawa's casting of a woman as a central character for the first time since the 1940s, which he suggests may have been Kurosawa commemorating his late wife, who died in 1985. As a reference to Kurosawa's former work, Prince examines the director's use of the axial cut (a jump cut that pushes in to focus on the characters) in the silent conversation between Kane and her friend. He describes its use in Rhapsody as a form of quotation, a technique whose use is more iconographic than narrative. Kurosawa does not show any direct depiction of the bomb, but uses the depiction of a massive eye overlaid on the mountains as a representation of Kane's recollection and Kurosawa's cinema of memory. For Goodwin, the silent conversation between Kane and her friend is indicative of the bomb's unspeakable horror and an attempt to frame the past in a personal context without using conventional narrative or cinematic forms such as a flashback. He considers the silence itself to express reflection. This personal reflection of memory he likens to a monologue. Yoshimoto likewise comments on the lack of visualization and use of silence by witnesses to the atomic attack as a means of remembering the event and mourning the dead.

In a 1991 Kinema Junpo feature upon the release of the film, Reiko Kitagawa wrote on the link between grandmother and grandchildren, seeing in the natural world an analogue to the memory of the atomic bomb itself. The children experience death through the songs they sing, the remains of a pair of trees struck by lightning near which their grandmother's brother had lived, the waterfall, and the twisted jungle gym. To Ehrlich, too, the film's natural scenes represent the connection between a micro– and macrocosmic view of the bomb, giving the example of how the expressionistic image of the eye overlaid on the mushroom cloud is mirrored in the eye of a snake seen at the waterfall. Goodwin sees in the image of the 'eye' an abstraction of human consciousness and an awareness of a new age. Writing about the bomb's commemoration, Conrad comments on the film's depiction of smaller, local ceremonies as a form of private practice, rather than large public events to memorialize the bomb victims.

==== Clark's apology ====
The scene where Clark meets Kane and apologises to her caused significant controversy among film critics when the film was released. The children's parents—Clark's cousins—enamored with the wealth of their Hawaiian family, deliberately fail to tell Clark that his uncle was a victim of the bomb. Richie describes the parents' self-serving behavior—which seeks to forget the effects of the bomb—as impeding the reconciliation between Clark and Kane. Richie reads the apology scene as an atonement for the use of the atomic bombs.

However, Stuart Galbraith IV views the scene instead as an apology from Clark for his insensitivity in asking Kane to go to Hawaii during the anniversary of her husband's death. To him, Clark's apology comes from his acceptance of responsibility for possibly having offended her. Conrad and Prince likewise read the scene as an apology for failing to realize his family's suffering. Yoshimoto similarly states that Clark's apology reflects his status as a family member, and not an American. That is, that Clark is not apologizing for the bomb, but for failing to realize that he and his family had acted selfishly in talking of themselves and not understanding the extent of her pain. Prince goes on to analyse Kane's general anti-war response as indicative of Kurosawa's feelings, but criticizes the film's tone as unpersuasive when the adolescent characters become the voice of conscience and narrate about the city's forgetfulness.

==== Kane's departure ====
Prince examines the events preceding Kane's departure as a collapse of the past into the present as she relives her experience of the bombing. To Kane, the memory of the atomic bomb becomes indistinguishable from a thunderstorm. Although she is forced to live in the present day, the final sequence embodies her attempt to psychologically return to the past which she has been stuck in. Yoshimoto sees the final scene of Kane's march through the storm as a departure from the film's realism and notes the connection between the past and present that links the death of her husband to that of her older brother in Hawaii. To Galbraith the scene indicates that Kane's endurance in the natural world lasts as long as it is remembered by future generations. Prince continues, viewing the final moments of Kane appearing to march in place as a visual representation of her contradictory and unattainable desire to escape the postwar era, despite centering her concerns on the atomic bomb which defined it. Whereas Kitagawa views the umbrella Kane carries to shield her from the storm to be a symbol of life, the film critic Yuichiro Nishimura views the sequence to be symbolic of her death and ascension to heaven.

=== Music and religion ===
The scholar Yusuke Kataoka writes on the image of the Virgin Mary in the film, analyzing how the "Stabat Mater" (a piece played during mass describing Mary's sadness after Jesus' death on the cross) is played when the children visit Nagasaki Peace Park for the first time, and again when Clark visits the site where his uncle was killed. Kataoka describes this repetition as a means of reconciliation between both sides of the family, and Japan and America more broadly. Regarding the scene of ants climbing up a thornless rose while the bomb is commemorated by worshippers chanting the Heart Sutra, Kataoka identifies the rose as a symbol of Mary, and considers the scene to be a kind of dual religious lament.

Richie comments on the use of Franz Schubert's "Heidenröslein" as a leitmotif heard throughout the film—in addition to the sudden change in the final scene from choreographed long-shots to a rhythm of fast-cutting—as an affirmation of survival and the human condition. Goodwin examines the use of Schubert's piece in this scene and compares the "rose" referenced in the song to the rose climbed over by a colony of ants, with the flower's color and bloom a reference to the sight of the bomb. Galbraith identifies the lyrics of the song with Kane herself, and suggests that this mirrors the similarly unexplained scene following a train of ants while the atom bomb survivors chant nenbutsu. Yoshimoto also identifies these associations and analyses them as an allegory for the preciousness of life in the aftermath of the nuclear blast. Kataoka sees in the use of "Heidenröslein" a counterpoint to the "Stabat Mater", where the use of music outside the narrative world, and Kane's growing delusions, subvert the image of reconciliation by implying the continued danger of nuclear weapons.

== Release ==
Kurosawa was approached by Orion Classics to theatrically distribute the film in America, and a deal was finalised in August 1990. The film was previewed in March 1991 before being shown out of competition at the 1991 Cannes Film Festival in May. American reviewers took umbrage with what was perceived as anti-American sentiment. Concerned about its commercial success, Shochiku encouraged some large companies within Japan to sell tickets directly to their employees. A pre-order ticket campaign saw ¥300 of the ¥1,300 ticket price go to the Japanese Society for Preservation of Birds, which was assisting birds that were affected by the Gulf War. The film was distributed in Japan by Shochiku, the first time Kurosawa had partnered with the company since directing The Idiot (1951). It was released in Japan on 25 May 1991.

The film opened in America on 19 December 1991. In 1990 James Scheibel, the mayor of Nagasaki's American sister city, Saint Paul, Minnesota, visited Nagasaki and learned that there was no sculpture in the city's Peace Park from the United States. Rhapsody in August held its midwest premiere in St. Paul in 1991 as part of the efforts to raise funds for the Constellation Earth sculpture, which was donated to the Peace Park and formally unveiled in September 1992.

== Reception ==
=== Box office ===
In Japan the film earned upwards of $10 million in rentals. The film's box office chances in America were cut by a series of negative reviews and bad publicity concerning the film's political content. As a result, returns were unremarkable. Opening in seven theaters to a box office of $26,771 ($63,281 in 2025), the film accrued $516,431 ($1.22 million in 2025) in total. The film saw some financial success in Europe, garnering $5 million before it had premiered in Japan.

=== Critical response ===
Rhapsody in August has an approval rating of 60% on review aggregator website Rotten Tomatoes, based on 15 reviews, and an average rating of 6.1/10. The film received mixed reviews upon its release in Japan. Writing in Kinema Junpo on the film's release, Yu Hamano praised the film's structure, in particular emphasizing how the film switches from stillness to motion in order to capture the conflicting emotions that permeate the film. Nishimura also focused on the film's structure, believing it employed a jo-ha-kyu rhythm adopted from Noh theatre that informs a fantastical approach to the theme of death. The film scholar Susanne Schermann wrote that the film depicted a mundane family life that shows Kane as overcoming tragedy by forgiving the past through interactions with her family. Schermann called the final scene "ambiguous and haunting" and considers Kurosawa's handling of the Second World War to advocate for a humanist condemnation of violence evident as a theme in his work since his first film, Sanshiro Sugata (1943). However, Japanese cultural critic Inuhiko Yomota, addressing some of the film's political content, commented: "Many critics, myself included, thought Kurosawa chauvinistic in his portrayal of the Japanese as victims of the war, while ignoring the brutal actions of the Japanese and whitewashing them with cheap humanist sentiment."

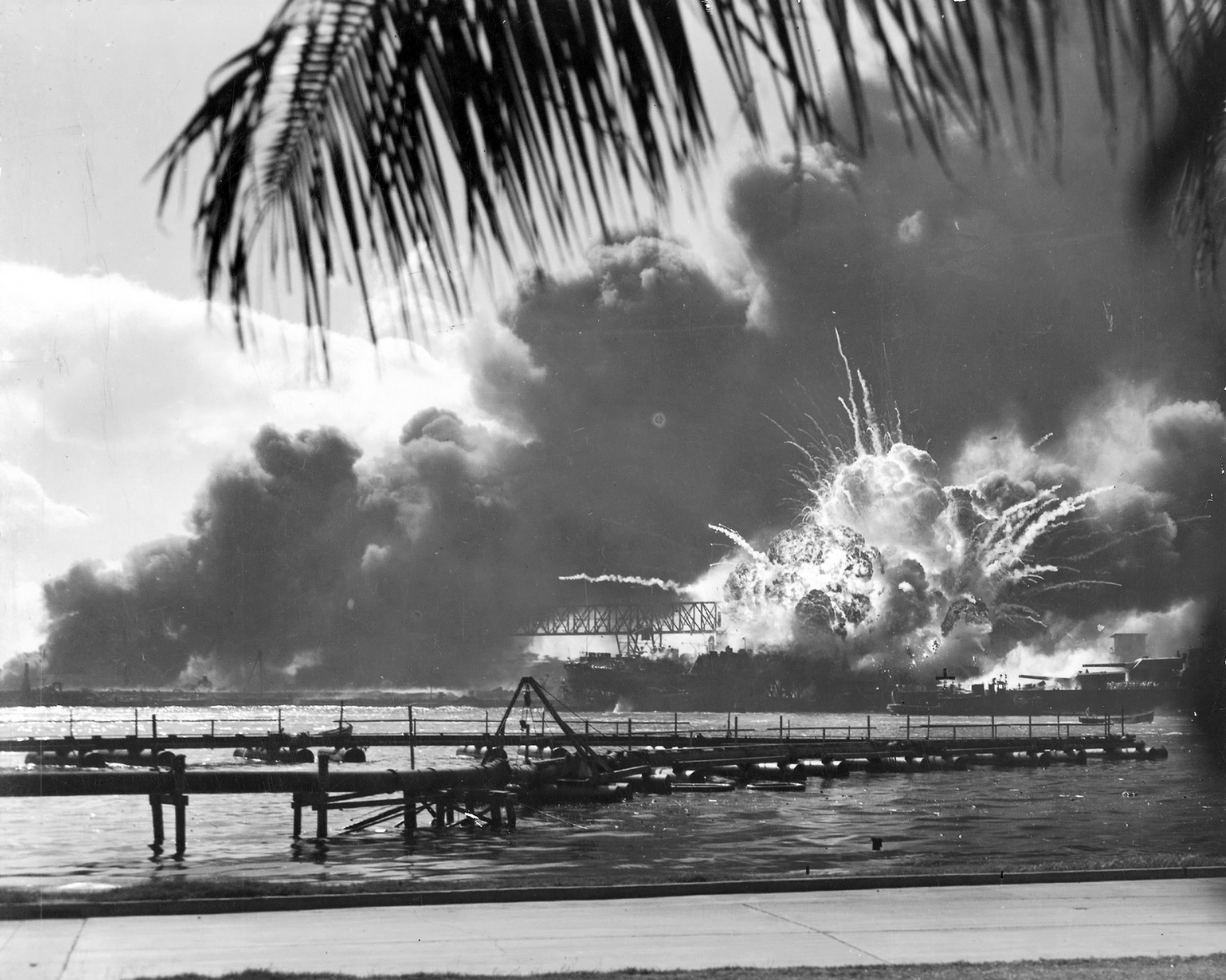
Some American reviewers were upset at the film's lack of acknowledgement of the attack on Pearl Harbor when they believed Clark apologized for the atomic bombings of Hiroshima and Nagasaki.

In America, the film was received poorly. For instance, many Americans criticized Gere's casting as a half-Japanese man. The film was further criticized for being overly-sentimental, and accusations arose that Kurosawa's film was anti-American. Critics of Japanese militarism at both the Tokyo Film Festival and Cannes Film Festival believed Rhapsody failed to contextualize the focus on the atomic bomb by addressing Japanese war crimes and the attack on Pearl Harbor. During the press conference at its premiere at Cannes, one journalist asked, "Why was the bomb dropped in the first place?" Kurosawa anticipated that his intentions may be misread, an effect Galbraith attributes to the broader conservative culture of the era as a reaction to the Japanese economic miracle, but the director denied any political motivations when conceiving of the film. The film critic Roger Ebert wrote that the film was viewed as a disappointment at Cannes. In a three out of four star review, he continued that it was not among Kurosawa's best films, but that it worked as a personal meditation on the effect of the atomic bomb.

Vincent Canby of The New York Times argued that the film's message was targeted toward a Japanese audience rather than a Western audience. He described Kurosawa's message as being anti-war, but believed that Clark's apology was for the American bombing of Nagasaki, and that this should have been contextualized. Kevin Thomas of The LA Times praised the film's focus on family via the exploration of nature and religious tradition, but both he and Desson Howe of The Washington Post specifically criticized Kurosawa's failure to mention Pearl Harbor despite the American relatives in the family being from Hawaii. Howe panned the film and considered it a misfire. A review in Deseret News praised the film for its sentimental tone and depiction of trauma. A four out of five star review in Empire magazine published in 2000 rejected accusations of the film being overly-sentimental, praising Gere's acting and the use of weather in the film.

=== Accolades ===
Award	Date of ceremony	Category	Recipient(s)	Result	Ref.
Kinema Junpo Best Ten	1991	Best Ten List	Rhapsody in August	Third	
Japan Academy Film Prize	March 20, 1992	Picture of the Year	Rhapsody in August	Nominated	
Japan Academy Film Prize	March 20, 1992	Director of the Year	Akira Kurosawa	Nominated	
Japan Academy Film Prize	March 20, 1992	Screenplay of the Year	Akira Kurosawa	Nominated	
Japan Academy Film Prize	March 20, 1992	Best Actress	Sachiko Murase	Nominated	
Japan Academy Film Prize	March 20, 1992	Best Supporting Actor	Hisashi Igawa	Nominated	
Japan Academy Film Prize	March 20, 1992	Best Cinematography	Takao Saitō	Won	
Japan Academy Film Prize	March 20, 1992	Best Lighting	Takeharu Sano	Won	
Japan Academy Film Prize	March 20, 1992	Best Art Direction	Yoshiro Muraki	Won	
Japan Academy Film Prize	March 20, 1992	Best Sound Recording	Koichi Benitani	Won	

== See also ==
- Japanese-American
- List of submissions to the 64th Academy Awards for Best Foreign Language Film
- List of Japanese submissions for the Academy Award for Best Foreign Language Film
