= Themes in Seven Samurai =

Analyses of the 1954 film

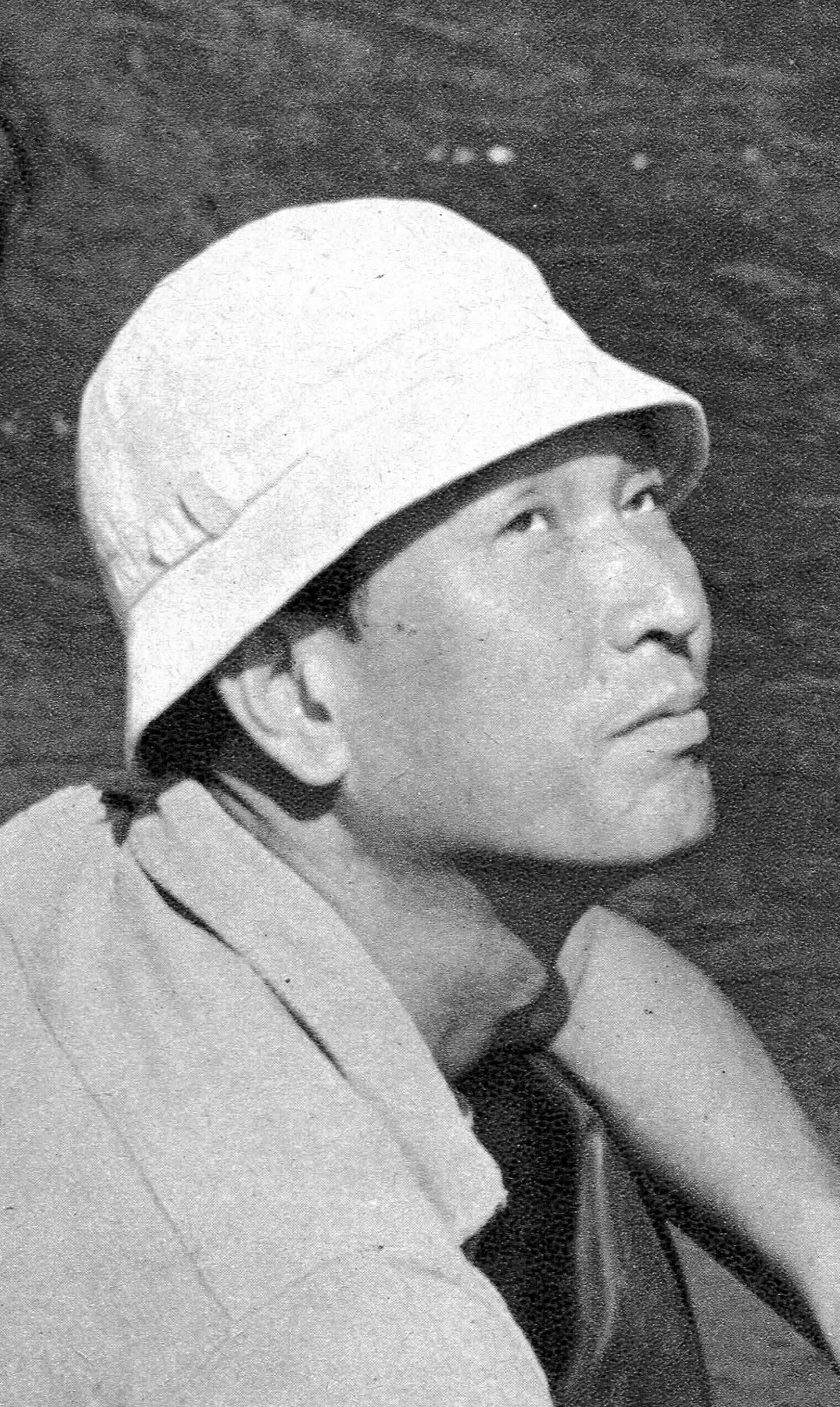
Akira Kurosawa, director of Seven Samurai

Seven Samurai (Japanese: 七人の侍, Hepburn: Shichinin no Samurai) is a 1954 Japanese epic samurai action film directed by Akira Kurosawa. Scholars and critics have analysed at the role of class in the film, and how different social groups have been positioned both to contrast each other, and become unified in the frame. Scholars have debated the meaning of various symbols throughout the film, including the use of weather, flags, and clothing as identifiers of social class. Concern with class can also be found in the film's overlapping discussions of morality, gender, and the environment.

In Seven Samurai, the individual characters each maintain heroic elements and character development that sees them fulfilling their role as members of the social class, while seeking to create a more unified community. Some have identified a level of irony in the film concerning the deaths of various samurai. Scholars generally agree that the ending of the film positions the relationship between the samurai and the farmers as broken and serves to emphasise the temporary status of the samurai.

== Class ==
=== Samurai ===
Donald Richie, in his The Films of Akira Kurosawa (1965), analyses each of the titular samurai as individuals, he sees Kyuzo as the greatest embodiment of the samurai, being both skillful with his swordsmanship and pacific in his appreciation of nature. Katsushiro, the youngest samurai, is analysed through his coming-of-age. When he first meets the farmer girl Shino, he is naively picking flowers as she is, then after he has had sex and killed someone for the first time he has entered adulthood, but his weeping after the final battle indicates he has still yet to become a man. Richie views Kambei as a man who inspires others by seeking to change the world according to personal example. His leadership is a stoic one that successfully balances the role of the individual and the collective. The scholar Stuart Galbraith IV charts the character arc of Kambei as being one who hopes he can affect the world around him positively by helping the farmers when they only have rice to give, to becoming disillusioned with them after it becomes clear that they are not innocent people, and that by the end they have forgotten the samurai's selflessness.

To the film theorist Stephen Prince, the samurai of the film embody a physical strength in their cultivation of the samurai code, bushido, rather than a spiritual strength. Galbraith mentions the fact that, despite them being masterless samurai, the film's title does not refer to the samurai as ronin, because they are spiritual adherents to bushido. He analyses the four deaths of the seven samurai as each being the result of gunfire, a corrupting influence from the west. Desser also notes the fact that the samurai are all killed by firearms, believing their deaths to be ironic, with Heihachi dying when he could not see his enemy despite always running away, Gorobei because he dies without any moral conviction for helping the farmers, Kyuzo for he sought to improve his ability with a sword, and Kikuchiyo for his comment that he would hate to die in the village.

Richie, despite recognising Kurosawa's desire to get away from the chanbara (sword fighting films) tropes of inclination juxtaposing duty, still views the samurai's actions as in some way showing the division between the two. He sees duty to the farmers as an illusion created by the samurai for an unfulfilled hope for change, whereas the samurai's former pursuit of inclination by taking the job in the first place turns out to be valueless and isolating at the end of the film. To Richie, this is a struggle of the human spirit that suggests that choice and bravery should be insisted upon in the face of a chaotic and overwhelming world. Prince refers to Seven Samurai as the "paramount exploration of the elusiveness and paradoxical nature of glory."

The philosopher Gilles Deleuze comments in his book, Cinema 1: The Movement Image (1986), on the role of the samurai as absorbers of situation. The process of the samurai gathering information about the village also causes them to absorb the psychological situation of the farmers. He considers this process to ask the central question of, "'What is a samurai today, at this particular moment of History?'" Their absorption sees the samurai becomes shadows in the world. To Goodwin, the film represents an ironic take on the historical power of the samurai, writing that by the end of the film, the defeat of the bandits and the training of the farmers leaves the role of the samurai obsolete.

=== Farmers ===
Prince notes the introduction of the farmer Rikichi as one where he exclaims that the farmers should not be so passive in accepting their fate, but that his objections to the villagers' passivity sees the edit reinscribe into the group, as when he walks off, the camera position changes so that he is in the foreground while the rest of the farmers are in the background. To Prince, this eliminates the separation between the individual farmer and the social group.

Conrad considers Seven Samurai to act as a mirror for class relations in Japan post–Second World War. He considers the film to reflect audience experiences that had known change but existed in continuity with the past, utilising the farmers as a connective tissue as their standard of living had risen during the occupation of Japan, but their work was similar in the 20th century as it was in 16th century, with many Japanese people knowing, or coming from, farming families.

=== Social structure ===
The academic David Desser identifies the introduction of the samurai with a form of "role-confusion" that establishes their relationship with the farmers. He compares this to Kambei's first meeting with Kikuchiyo, where he doubts the latter's assertions of samurai status despite Kikuchiyo carrying a sword, mirrored by how Kambei willingly adopts the clothes of a priest to fool a criminal. Desser interprets this to mean that symbols of status do not indicate a person's character. Prince views Kambei's Buddhist priest disguise as a fulfillment of his class identity, where humane action is the individual basis for loyalty to the group. Because the group aim is freedom, class status acts as a code to restrict individual choice and pursue the group aim. Prince views the film as a struggle against class heritage, one that would traditionally force the samurai to let the farmers suffer the bandits. He describes the film as a need to overcome forms of scarcity, with class being the mechanism to structure competition of control over resources and labour.

Mitsuhiro Yoshimoto points out that even though the samurai and distinct farmers are characterised individually, to some extent they lack autonomy, having to subordinate their desires to the cohesion of the group. He views the individual characters of the samurai as transcending the type of character they embody, with each group (the bandits, farmers, and samurai) constructing relationships based on this balance between their personality and their group identity. To historian David Conrad, Kikuchiyo's social position is unidentifiable. He is not a samurai, and hates peasants, and does not belong to any other social caste. The flag that portrays circles for the samurai and the hiragana for 'field' to represent the village, shows Kikuchiyo as a triangle between the village and the samurai, connecting the two groups. Conrad sees the film as pessimistic about the possibility for individuals to change the social structure that shapes their lives. At the end of the film, he considers the relationship between the castes to be basically unchanged, with Kikuchiyo's burial as a samurai—despite not being born into the class—indicating that death is the only positive outcome for the samurai.

=== Conflict and unity ===
Prince defines Seven Samurai's relationship to class as one that seeks to define whether the setting of the past can help reveal the dialectic between class and the individual, and whether the social construction of individuals conflicts with ideas about individual heroism. He concludes his analysis by describing the tension in the film as being one between a simultaneous belief in class exploitation and the dissolution of class resulting in the end of the heroic individual who provides a moral example. Conrad believes the film offers a third perspective between the contemporary Cold War debates on class between capitalist and communist powers. To him, class (defined as difference in economic position) is no less important as a category to transcend than other social groupings such as gender, and ancestry; which the film repeatedly emphasises the difficulty of.

Richie acknowledges that the film has parallels to Soviet cinema of the 1930s, but insists that although the film is about social groups, it mostly concerns the development of individual characters. He identifies the three core groups as the seven samurai, the forty bandits, and the more than one hundred farmers, discussing how the groups are divided by the film's structure and use of music. While low drums are used for the bandits, the samurai's theme uses a male chorus and horn instruments, and the farmers' are identified with folk music; these musical motifs are heard together, but never played at the same time.

Desser views the relationship between farmers and samurai to be mediated by weaponry, with Kikuchiyo being the only member of the samurai who synthesises the relationship between the two classes. When it is revealed the farmers had in the past killed wounded samurai and stolen their armour, Kyuzo comments that he would like to kill them all, which Desser takes as an exclamation of his moral belief in bushido. To Prince, Kikuchiyo's speech about the suffering wrought on farmers by the samurai implicates the samurai in the crimes of the bandits, and as such their efforts to defeat them effectively bring them to the state of "annihilating their own class." He views the unity of the farmers and samurai during a period of historical and spatial class disintegration as a means to transcend class conflict and oppression. The possibility of an organic community Prince refers to as a millenarian vision of social justice.

The flag is a symbol of the new relations between the samurai and the farmers.

Desser notes that the samurai and farmers are buried together on the same hillside (although the samurai are buried at the top), and writes that this indicates a unity in death. He goes on to describe two specific instances of unity between the two classes: the flag which has symbols that identify both the samurai and the farmers, and the relationship between Katsushiro and Shino. This latter relationship he describes as demonstrating the inability of unity between the two groups, however, as the other samurai and Shino's father each have different reactions to the consummation of the pair's love. Prince also analyses the flag as a form of the new relations between samurai and farmer, where the defence of the village is a defence of the organic community that has eradicated class. However, he notes that the use of the flag at Heihachi's funeral sees the camera movement and edits focus on the farmers and the symbol for the village, indicating their longevity as a social group against the samurai's temporary status.

To Galbraith, Kikuchiyo's death in the film, while an actualisation of his samurai status, is debased. At the start of the film, the character had been enamoured with what the class status of samurai conferred, but the events of the story force him to confront his past, and he ends the film dead in the village of farmers analogous to the one he had been born into. Richie, rather, sees Kikuchiyo's death as an actualisation of his humanity, seeking to impress both Kambei and Katsushiro both with his bravery. It is through his humanity, and his origin as the son of a farmer himself, that the character of Kikuchiyo raises the question of how the different social groups are equated, and that the actions of the samurai and the bandits are comparable to each other. Prince sees the ending of the film to be ironic, positing the failure of the alliance between samurai and farmer, with the final shot linking the surviving samurai to the graves of their comrades, and separated from the farmers by the peasants.

==== Cross-class identification ====
Desser considers Kambei's decision to fight for the farmers to be emblematic of his humanistic impulse, which influences audience identification with the farmers. Similarly, it is not Kambei's strengths as a leader, but his ethic that encourages Gorobei and Katsushiro to join him. Conrad claims that the level of complexity seen in the characters of the farmers prevents audience identification with them. Richie considers the film's ending hopeful, seeing the film's final scene of the farmers planting rice to be an encapsulation of the audience's emotional and childlike identification with all humanity.

Kikuchiyo can not read the scroll that he produces to indicate his own samurai status in a way similar to how the farmers can not know the motives of the samurai they approach to help them defend their village. The farmers' fear at the samurai's arrival demonstrates a gap in power and the existential condition that marks their relationship, and the audience's identification with the farmers. Meanwhile, Kikuchiyo's strong fishing ability and familiarity with the village warning system indicates a familiarity between both classes.

== Morality ==
Galbraith presents the film's setting as harsh and violent, populated with flawed characters that are concerned with enduring the chaos of the world around them. He comments that the audience is invited to question the motives of both the samurai and the farmers. Despite this, he does consider the film to offer a solution to its presented moral problems. Conrad analyses Kikuchiyo's speech upon the samurai finding a hidden cache of weapons as a rejection of both the samurai's offended honour at the implication of the farmers' killings, and the supposed nobility of the peasantry, believing it instead to only highlight a human condition of moral failing. He further analyses the role of weaponry in the film, viewing the link between guns and villainy as a subtle moral critique of Westernisation, with the seven samurai choosing to fight with traditional swords even after capturing the bandits' firearms.

Desser considers the setting of Seven Samurai to be a frontier space that takes place in an era of civil war, and as such the film's boundaries are morally ambiguous. As there is no central authority, moral choices are left to individual characters. Films in which there are individual characters who allow themselves to be split between their developing individual identity and their social role, are considered emblematic of "Nostalgic Samurai drama"—a form that Desser says Seven Samurai both embodies and transcends. He frames this discussion by writing that the farmers' own weaknesses and ingratitude make the samurai more heroic and more tragic, and that it is because the farmers are flawed that the samurai should save them. He describes the death of Heihachi—occurring from an unseen firearm as a result of him trying to protect the farmer Rikichi—as being the result of his own humanity. To Prince, the defense of the village is a self-sacrificial act drawing from the Christian influence of Fyodor Dostoevsky on Kurosawa, where people ought to be encouraged to cultivate an individualistic ethic as a social imperative.

Desser draws a parallel between Kambei's killing of the criminal and Kyuzo's killing of a challenger in a duel. Both interactions are shown in slow motion, and both introduce the two samurai. However, the use of an extreme long shot in Kyuzo's case implies a different moral situation, one where the circumstances of the duel indicate that humanity has taken a secondary role in the swordsman's understanding of morality.

== Environment ==
=== Geography and space ===
Prince notes the use of editing to identify the farmers with both the space of the village itself, and "the abstract idea of community". He continues, believing that the use of the edit consistently reinscribes individuals into a space that forces identification with their social group. The samurai survey the land when they arrive at the village. Galbraith notes the use of the edit to cut between sections of the village and the corresponding parts of Kambei's map. Geography is additionally used to develop the characters of the village. When Kambei asserts that three houses on one side of the river have to be sacrificed for the other twenty, the initially aghast Mosuke later comments offhandedly to no longer care for them when the bandits arrive, even as his own home is destroyed.

To Prince, the forest is identified as a location of mystery and sensuality.

=== Nature and weather ===
Desser notes that the beginning of the film shows the bandits on top of the hill overlooking the village, analogising them to the sun. He analyses this use of the weather as symbolic of the farmers' lack of control over forces outside their village. The scholar believes the relationship between the samurai and the farmers embodies a dichotomy between nature and culture. The farmers win and they belong to the forces of nature, whereas the cultural forces of violence and political chaos are the domain of the samurai and the bandits. He sees the intrusion of the rain in the final battle as a symbol of nature that aids the farmers while the cultural battle between samurai and bandits ends with their mutual defeat. He views the farmers' hiring of the samurai as a means to unite nature and culture to pursue their own agricultural ends. In addition, the rice that the farmers are seen planting is a metaphysical rejection of the individualistic, wandering samurai's way of life.

Deleuze comments on the use of rain in Seven Samurai, believing it to symbolise the topological space of the situation-action formula, an understanding of spatial and environmental factors in the film's frame that enable characters within the story to act. The rain acts as a vertical line that emphasises horizontal movements in the frame. Galbraith identifies the use of rain with scenes of contemplation, and the use of wind with emotional climaxes and impending change. Prince notes that the rain following the confrontation between Shino and her father after the consummated relationship with Katsushiro acts as an emotional cue that cools the emotions of the scene.

For Yoshimoto, the final battle sees the samurai and farmers fighting the mud itself, struggling to stay alive, a factor that is implicated in the film's departure from contemporary jidaigeki films and their highly choreographed swordfights. D. P. Martinez sees the natural world as inextricably tied to the role of women in the film, a theme converging at the end where Shino rejects Katsushiro and life, fertility, and continuity are exemplified by the image of her planting rice. Thus women in the film are associated with the endurance of male violence that arises from a masculine need to protect the village.

== Gender ==
In Martinez's analysis of women's role in Seven Samurai, she notes that it is the cry of an anonymous woman who has forsaken any hope of intervention from other powers—specifically that there are neither gods nor bodhisattvas—that spurs the men into action at the beginning of the film. The men who want to return home after unsuccessfully searching for samurai to protect their village have their protests silenced when they are forced to remember what might happen to the women and children. When they find Kambei, the samurai dresses as a priest to trick a criminal holding a kidnapped child, Martinez considers the silence and use of slow motion marking the criminal's death to be undercut by the sobbing of the mother and child reuniting. In this way, the farmers who have given up hope in divine power find the defender of the village in a priest.

Martinez juxtaposes the character of Shino and Rikichi's missing wife. She characterises Shino as aware of her place in the social hierarchy, but rebellious. When her father cuts off her hair, Martinez views this scene as containing undertones of sexual violence and having a chilling effect on the rest of the village, causing them to hide the women from the samurai. Shino's sexual encounters with Katsushiro are also marked by a level of aggression, but always with both of them too shy to pursue it. Martinez notes that, while the relationship between the two young lovers is seen by the farmers as dishonouring, Rikichi's wife, however, was not forcefully taken by the bandits, but willfully given to them as a means to bargain with them, as such she reads the woman's suicide as not shameful, but vengeful. Her self-immolation is later echoed in the village elder's refusal to leave his house on the other side of the river as a form of atonement for betraying her.

Desser describes Katsushiro, the young samurai, and Shino, the village girl, as being united by their shared lack of training within their respective social classes. As such, their relationship closes the gap between farmers and samurai and they act as the "only real mediators between the two groups." He considers their relationship "essentially non-romantic" for not remaining together and being divided inseparably by class. Conrad sees in the relationship between Katsushiro and Shino a contemporary concern that had remained postwar, centring on the illusion of chastity among young men and women in an age dominated by arranged marriage. He also views the scene of the raid on the bandits, climaxing in the suicide of Rikichi's wife, as indicative of this culture that prioritised chastity and fidelity—with suicide being a means to restore or atone for a loss of honour.

== Technique ==
Richie identifies the use of motion in the film as a key theme. He notes that almost every frame has some kind of motion within it. Kurosawa also uses the motion of the edit, often increasing the pace of the film by using short-cuts. Richie uses the example of Heihachi's funeral to demonstrate how the varying use of movement from the funeral, to the use of the banner, to the arrival of the bandits, to the defence of the village indicates a change of emotion; respectively corresponding to sorrow, defiance, alarm, and joy. He identifies the creation of continuous movement in Kurosawa's use of editing. To him, Kurosawa's method of cutting by using the motion of the camera and different techniques to indicate changes in scene (e.g. wipes) to indicate continuity. Prince comments on the use of tracking cameras and intercutting to frame the individual power of the seven samurai as well as their unification into the group, simultaneously being linked with others through the continuity of the frame.

Seven Samurai was the first film where Kurosawa used a multi-camera approach, which he used to help actors overcome their own self-consciousness of having a single camera placed on them. Prince views the effect of this to fragment the film's images as an anticipation of his montage. Prince analyses the room where the farmers gather the samurai in the town. In the scene the edits cut to different angles and rarely repeat the same composition, and when they are repeated, camera movement changes the position of characters in relation to each other. He describes it as a fragmented space where the groups are separated from each other; serving to reframe the individual heroism of the samurai, transformed by changes in social relations. Yoshimoto notes the importance of close-up shots to foreground each character's individuality. Rather than occurring as part of a pattern of shot-reverse-shot used to assist the narrative, Yoshimoto considers their use "abrupt and abstract", and believes these close-ups to indicate character interiority. While its use on humans isolates them, he uses the example of a bowl of rice held by Kambei that is foregrounded against the farmers in the background to establish the relationship between the farmers and the samurai.

=== Structure ===
Desser identifies the film with a dialectical structure which is both conservative and radical in presenting plot and cinematic codes. He chiefly identifies a broad theme in Kurosawa's work to be a division between the director's humanistic and formalistic tendencies, believing it is exemplified in Seven Samurai by the use of firearms. Desser divides the film into four sections: the introduction of the farmers, the introduction of the samurai, the training of the farmers, and the final battle. There exists oppositions both within each section and between sections. He describes the traditional genre foundations of the film as a common theme in Kurosawa's work: the interaction between settled communities and nomadic persons, and notes the dialectic between these and other elements to create unique developments.
