= The Green Slime =

1968 film by Kinji Fukasaku

- U.S. theatrical release poster
- Directed by: Kinji Fukasaku
- Screenplay by: Bill Finger (Note: Credited as 'William Finger'.); Tom Rowe; Charles Sinclair
- Story by: Ivan Reiner
- Produced by: Walter Manley; Ivan Reiner
- Starring: Robert Horton; Richard Jaeckel; Luciana Paluzzi
- Cinematography: Yoshikazu Yamasawa
- Edited by: Osamu Tanaka
- Music by: Toshiaki Tsushima; Charles Fox (U.S. cut)
- Production company: Toei Company; Ram Films; Southern Cross Film Company; Metro-Goldwyn-Mayer
- Distributed by: Toei Company (Japan); Metro-Goldwyn-Mayer (U.S.)
- Release dates: December 1, 1968 (U.S.); December 19, 1968 (Japan)
- Running time: 77 minutes (Japan cut); 90 minutes (U.S. cut)
- Countries: Japan; United States
- Language: English (Note: Filmed in English, later dubbed into Japanese.)

The Green Slime (Japanese: ガンマー第3号 宇宙大作戦, Hepburn: Ganmā Daisan Gō: Uchū Daisakusen; lit. 'Gamma 3: The Great Space War') is a 1968 science fiction film directed by Kinji Fukasaku and starring Robert Horton, Richard Jaeckel and Luciana Paluzzi. It was written by Bill Finger, Tom Rowe and Charles Sinclair, from a story by Reiner.

After destroying a huge asteroid that was on a rapid collision course with Earth, a group of astronauts discover they have accidentally returned to their space station with an alien slime creature that feeds on radiation and can reproduce rapidly from its own blood.

The film was an international co-production between Japan's Toei Company and American studio Metro-Goldwyn-Mayer. It was shot entirely in Japan with an all-Japanese crew, but a mostly-American cast. It was released in the United States on December 1, 1968, and in Japan on December 19.

== Plot ==
A group of scientists discover that an asteroid, named Flora, is on a collision course with Earth. The space program summons Commander Jack Rankin to take command of space station Gamma 3 and destroy the asteroid, stating that if he fails he should not bother coming back, because the asteroid collision would cause an extinction event.

Rankin goes to Gamma 3 where he runs into an old comrade, Commander Vince Elliot, with whom he has a history. Nevertheless, Rankin carries out the mission commanding a shuttle onto the surface of Flora to set bombs to destroy it. While on the surface, they discover a strange amoeba like creature attaching to their vehicles and sucking the energy out. The science officer, Dr. Halversen, tries to bring a sample of the green substance aboard the shuttle in a sealed container, but Rankin angrily throws the container to the ground causing it to shatter and some of the green slime to attach to Halversen's space suit.

The detonation is a success and Flora is destroyed. The crew returns to Gamma 3 to celebrate while their suits go through decontamination. The energy from decontamination causes the green slime to evolve and grow and in the middle of the celebration an alarm goes off indicating trouble in the decontamination chamber. An officer opening the door is quickly killed by an unknown assailant.

When the senior officers arrive to investigate, they find the crew member electrocuted to death and a strange one-eyed tentacled creature that discharges lethal amounts of electricity. When they attempt to kill it with their laser weapons, they find that the creature's electricity causes its blood to grow into identical creatures, rapidly multiplying their numbers. Despite the attempts to contain the creatures, they quickly multiply even more to the point where they will soon overrun the station. Dr. Halversen is killed trying to contain the creatures.

Rankin, refusing to leave until the mission is completed, stays in command and decides to evacuate the station on shuttles and set the station to burn up in Earth's atmosphere. Elliott returns to help his friend and is killed trying to save him. Rankin manages to set up the crash landing and escapes with Elliott's body onto the shuttle as the station burns up and destroys all of the green slime creatures. Rankin logs the mission as a success and recommends the highest citation for Elliott posthumously.

== Cast ==
- Robert Horton as Commander Jack Rankin
- Richard Jaeckel as Commander Vince Elliott
- Luciana Paluzzi as Dr. Lisa Benson
- Bud Widom as General Jonathan B. Thompson
- Ted Gunther as Dr. Hans Halversen
- Robert Dunham as Captain Martin
- David Yorston as Lieutenant Curtis
- William Ross as Ferguson
- Gary Randolf as Cordier
- Linda Jo Miller and Patricia Elliott as Nurses

=== Japanese dub cast ===
- Gorō Naya as Commander Jack Rankin
- Ichirō Murakoshi as Commander Vince Elliott
- Haruko Kitahama as Lisa Benson
- Kōsei Tomita as General Jonathan B. Thompson

== Production ==
The Green Slime was a co-production between Metro-Goldwyn-Mayer, Ram Films, and Toei. MGM provided the funding and script while Toei provided the film crew and location to shoot the film. It was the second ever film co-produced by Ram Films and Toei after the 1966 film Terror Beneath the Sea.

The storyline for The Green Slime originated in Italy, where MGM also had dealings. Years before The Green Slime went into production, MGM had contracted Italian filmmaker Antonio Margheriti to direct what was intended to be a series of four television movies about the adventures of a space station called Gamma One. Margheriti's films in the series consisted of Wild, Wild Planet; War of the Planets; War Between the Planets and Snow Devils, all created over a period of three months and released in 1965. MGM was impressed with Margheriti's films and released the four films theatrically. Gamma One producers Manley and Reiner were eager to take advantage of these films and made The Green Slime as an unofficial fifth entry in the film series. The only connection the film had to Margheriti's films is the space station, retitled Gamma Three, which had a similar design as the one in Margheriti's films. The screenplay was co-written by Batman co-creator Bill Finger (credited as 'William Finger').

The US theatrical release includes a subplot involving Dr. Lisa Benson as a shared love interest between Rankin (a former flame) and Vince (her current fiance). The Japanese release version leaves out this subplot to make the film faster paced.

Green Slime was shot in Japan with a predominantly Asian film crew and Western actors. Aside from Horton, Jaeckel, and Paluzzi, the rest of the cast consisted of amateur and semi-professional Western actors and models living in Japan at the time. Yoshikazu Yamasawa was the cinematographer, and the film was edited by Osamu Tanaka. Toshiaki Tsushima composed the original score. Charles Fox re-scored much of the film for its release in United States, including the title song.

== Release ==
The Green Slime premiered in the United States on December 1, 1968, receiving a general theatrical release on May 21, 1969. The Green Slime was released in Japan on December 19, 1968. The Japanese version runs 77 minutes in comparison to the 90-minute version released in the United States by MGM, removing the arguments between the Rankin and Elliot characters, but adding a deathbed scene for Elliot.

=== Home media ===
The film's Japanese language version debuted in 2004 on DVD without English subtitles or dialog. On October 26, 2010, the American theatrical release debuted on DVD as part of the Warner Archive Collection. On October 10. 2017, Warner re-released the film on high-definition Blu-ray.

== Reception ==
Contemporary reviews of the film were mostly negative. Monthly Film Bulletin referred to the film as "junior league science fiction" that was "certainly schoolboy stuff". The review commented on the monsters in the film, stating that "the first appearance of the green slime looks promising, but the transformation of the lurid jelly into stock monsters is something of a let-down". Variety referred to the film as "a poor man's version of 2001", and described the story, script and special effects as "amateurish". The New York Times stated that the film "opens promisingly, keeps it up for about half an hour but then fades badly [...] the picture falls to pieces when the green menace becomes an army of rubbery-looking goblins".

In a retrospective review, Stuart Galbraith IV discussed the film in his book Japanese Science Fiction, Fantasy and Horror Films, finding that Fukasaku's direction was "flat and uninteresting" and that the special effects by ex-Toho employees Yukio Manoda and Akira Watanabe were worse than their previous work with Eiji Tsuburaya, noting that the "miniatures are badly lit and lacking in detail". Galbraith commented that the film was "ultimately undone by some of the most laughably ridiculous monsters in screen history" and that "the film isn't bad until the critters show up". In Phil Hardy's book Science Fiction (1984), the film was described as "not a very convincing entry in the vegetable monster movie subgenre". On Rotten Tomatoes, the film holds an approval rating of 23% based on 13 reviews, with a weighted average rating of 4.5 out of 10.

== Aftermath and influence ==
Excerpts from The Green Slime were used for the pilot episode of the film-mocking television series Mystery Science Theater 3000, produced in 1988 for Minneapolis-area television station KTMA. The pilot included human host (and series creator) Joel Hodgson, accompanied by Crow T. Robot. It did not include the character Tom Servo. His role evolved from a puppet named Beeper who spoke in high-pitched tones only Crow could understand.

Every year The Green Slime Award is given out for that year's worst in science fiction at Bubonicon, a tradition started by writer Roy Tackett in 1976.

== See also ==
- List of American films of 1968
- List of Japanese films of 1968
- List of films featuring space stations
- List of science fiction films of the 1960s
- The Quatermass Experiment
