= Los Ranchos de Albuquerque, New Mexico =

- Village
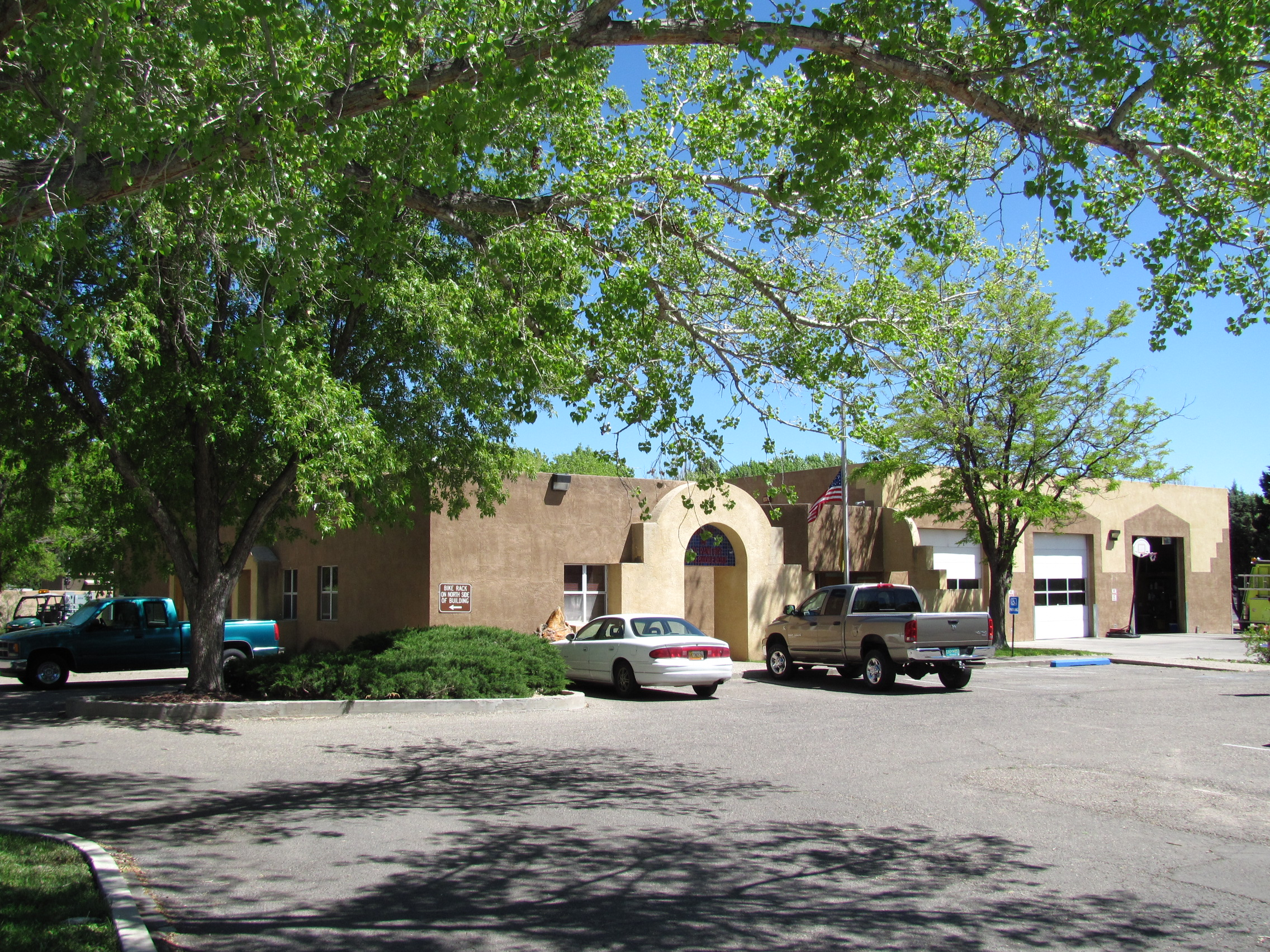
- Village Hall

- Location of Los Ranchos de Albuquerque, New Mexico

- Location in the United States Los Ranchos de Albuquerque (the United States)
- Coordinates: 35°10′20″N 106°38′47″W
- Country: United States
- State: New Mexico
- County: Bernalillo

Area
  - Total: 4.45 sq mi (11.53 km^{2})
  - Land: 4.45 sq mi (11.53 km^{2})
  - Water: 0 sq mi (0.00 km^{2})
- Elevation: 4,984 ft (1,519 m)

Population (2020)
  - Total: 5,874
  - Density: 1,319.5/sq mi (509.45/km^{2})
- Time zone: UTC-7 (Mountain (MST))
  - Summer (DST): UTC-6 (MDT)
- ZIP codes: 87107, 87114
- Area code: 505
- FIPS code: 35-43930
- GNIS feature ID: 2413568
- Website: losranchosnm.gov

Los Ranchos de Albuquerque, also known simply as "Los Ranchos", is a village in Bernalillo County, New Mexico. As of the 2020 census, Los Ranchos de Albuquerque had a population of 5,874.

== Description ==
Part of the Albuquerque metropolitan area, Los Ranchos is located on the east side of the Rio Grande, adjacent to the unincorporated North Valley area. Los Ranchos is surrounded on three sides by the larger city of Albuquerque. Like the North Valley and Corrales, Los Ranchos is a mostly rural area with widely spaced large houses and dense vegetation.

== History ==
=== Pueblo tribes ===
Signs of human activity in the middle Rio Grande valley date back to as early as 10,000 B.C. The introduction of cultivated maize from Mexico in 1,000 B.C. marked a major turning point in the settlement of the region, causing the traditionally nomadic tribes of the area to adopt a more agricultural way of life. The first pueblos in the area appeared between one and 600 A.D., established by the Tiwas (called Tigua by the Spaniards), and by 1,200 AD there were already 14 major sites along the Rio Grande from Algodones to Isleta, the Chamisal Site in present-day Los Ranchos being among the largest of these communities.

Hernando de Alvarado was reported as being one of the first Europeans to lay eyes on the region in September 1540 as the leader of a small convoy sent out by Coronado. He described the area as a "broad valley planted with fields of maize and dotted with cottonwood groves. There are twelve pueblos, whose houses are built of mud and are two stories high."

=== Early settlers ===
The first colonizing expedition into New Mexico was led by Juan de Oñate in 1598, and the fertile valley between Alameda and Atrisco was gradually populated by settlers living on scattered farms. The settlers were briefly driven out during the Pueblo Revolt of 1680, but returned in 1692. Frequent Apache and Navajo raiding compelled the settlers to consolidate their scattered dwellings into a series of plazas, which were easier to defend. Upriver from Albuquerque, these included Los Duranes, Los Candelarias, Los Griegos, and Los Ranchos, or more formally Plaza de Señor San José de los Ranchos. The Los Ranchos plaza was probably established around 1750, and had 176 residents living in 40 households at the time of the 1790 census. By 1814, the population had increased to 65 households and 331 people, and the village even became the seat of Bernalillo County for a brief period from 1851 to 1854. Unfortunately for its residents, the Los Ranchos area was prone to flooding, and the old village was badly damaged by major floods in 1874 and 1891 before being completely wiped away in a third flood in 1904. The continued flooding also turned much of the land alkaline and untillable.

=== Early 20th-century development ===
Many of the settling families sold their land to Anglo settlers and speculators after the railroad reached Albuquerque in 1880. In the face of growing demand for more housing, small subdivisions, land holdings and large country estates began to appear along Rio Grande Boulevard, new roads were constructed and existing ones were paved or removed. During the 20th century, a half-mile-long section of the Guadalupe Trail starting just south of Chamisal Road and extending north to Ranchitos Road became known as the new Los Ranchos.

"The 1930s marked a time when Albuquerque families began moving to the North Valley in greater numbers, some buying and restoring abandoned adobe homes, others proceeding to build large new houses." United States Representatives Albert Simms and his wife Ruth Hanna McCormick were among these families and built two houses designed by Santa Fe architect John Gaw Meem on the site of the current-day Los Poblanos Ranch. The valley continued to be home to many farms and ranches, and dairies were run by both Anglo and Spanish families alike. After World War II there was a new flood of settlers to Albuquerque, and the number of able-bodied men to work the land had thinned. Housing developments began to pop up on any available land around the Valley. Rob Lee Meadows was built on the site of the old Los Ranchos plaza, the farmlands belonging to the Robert Dietz family were turned into the rows of houses of Dietz Farms and over 100 acres of farm owned by the Charles Mann family became the present day Meadows on Rio Grande and Thomas Village homes.

=== Founding and incorporation ===
This sudden influx of newcomers and development after the war caused alarm that Albuquerque proper would annex Los Ranchos, and residents sought incorporation to prevent such a fate. After a successful vote, the village of Los Ranchos de Albuquerque was incorporated on December 29, 1958. People involved in incorporating the village included William Kitsch, Frederick O'Hara, Sam Hartnett, Paul Gillespie and Robert Nordhaus. This area contained the least developed section of the valley and included many of the larger homes and remaining open space. Restrictions on lot size and use have kept this area less built up and more verdant than other parts of the North Valley.

Today, Los Ranchos has been able to preserve much of its original rural agricultural nature.

== Geography ==
According to the United States Census Bureau, the village has a total area of 4.4 square miles (11.3 km^{2}), all land.

== Demographics ==
Historical population
Census	Pop.	Note	%±
1880	400		—
1970	1,900		—
1980	2,741		44.3%
1990	3,955		44.3%
2000	5,092		28.7%
2010	6,024		18.3%
2020	5,874		−2.5%
U.S. Decennial Census

=== 2020 census ===
As of the 2020 census, Los Ranchos de Albuquerque had a population of 5,874. The median age was 50.6 years. 18.3% of residents were under the age of 18 and 28.5% of residents were 65 years of age or older. For every 100 females there were 94.2 males, and for every 100 females age 18 and over there were 90.5 males age 18 and over.

100.0% of residents lived in urban areas, while 0.0% lived in rural areas.

There were 2,543 households in Los Ranchos de Albuquerque, of which 26.8% had children under the age of 18 living in them. Of all households, 46.4% were married-couple households, 18.2% were households with a male householder and no spouse or partner present, and 28.4% were households with a female householder and no spouse or partner present. About 30.1% of all households were made up of individuals and 15.9% had someone living alone who was 65 years of age or older.

There were 2,725 housing units, of which 6.7% were vacant. The homeowner vacancy rate was 1.4% and the rental vacancy rate was 6.0%.

Racial composition as of the 2020 census
Race	Number	Percent
White	3,541	60.3%
Black or African American	76	1.3%
American Indian and Alaska Native	157	2.7%
Asian	66	1.1%
Native Hawaiian and Other Pacific Islander	3	0.1%
Some other race	774	13.2%
Two or more races	1,257	21.4%
Hispanic or Latino (of any race)	2,599	44.2%

=== 2000 census ===
As of the 2000 census, there were 5,092 people, 1,997 households, and 1,431 families residing in the village. The population density was 1,247.3 inhabitants per square mile (481.6/km^{2}). There were 2,107 housing units at an average density of 516.1 per square mile (199.3/km^{2}). The racial makeup of the village was 81.60% White, 0.49% African American, 1.55% Native American, 0.71% Asian, 0.06% Pacific Islander, 12.14% from other races, and 3.46% from two or more races. Hispanic or Latino of any race were 37.41% of the population.

There were 1,997 households, out of which 30.1% had children under the age of 18 living with them, 57.4% were married couples living together, 9.7% had a female householder with no husband present, and 28.3% were non-families. 22.2% of all households were made up of individuals, and 7.6% had someone living alone who was 65 years of age or older. The average household size was 2.55 and the average family size was 2.98.

In the village, the population was spread out, with 23.9% under the age of 18, 5.9% from 18 to 24, 23.3% from 25 to 44, 33.0% from 45 to 64, and 13.8% who were 65 years of age or older. The median age was 43 years. For every 100 females, there were 93.3 males. For every 100 females age 18 and over, there were 91.7 males.

The median income for a household in the village was $60,500, and the median income for a family was $77,150. Males had a median income of $51,797 versus $31,757 for females. The per capita income for the village was $40,883. About 6.6% of families and 8.7% of the population were below the poverty line, including 11.6% of those under age 18 and 9.2% of those age 65 or over.

== Notable people ==
- Joshua Cooper Ramo, author and consultant
- John Ryan, former member of the New Mexico House of Representatives
- José Sarria, activist and former drag queen
- Roy Tackett, author and co-founder of Bubonicon

== Education ==
It is zoned to Albuquerque Public Schools.

== See also ==
- List of municipalities in New Mexico
