= The Emperor and the Wolf =

2002 work by Stuart Galbraith IV

The Emperor and the Wolf: The Lives and Films of Akira Kurosawa and Toshiro Mifune
- Author: Stuart Galbraith IV
- Genre: Biography
- Publisher: Faber and Faber
- Publication date: 2002
- Pages: 823
- ISBN: 978-0-571-19982-2
- Text: The Emperor and the Wolf: The Lives and Films of Akira Kurosawa and Toshiro Mifune at the Internet Archive

The Emperor and the Wolf: The Lives and Films of Akira Kurosawa and Toshiro Mifune is a 2002 joint biography book written by Stuart Galbraith IV. The work details the lives and films of Akira Kurosawa and Toshiro Mifune from their early life through to their deaths. Written in five years, the book was published by Faber and Faber. Reviews of the work praised it for its in-depth research, but criticised it for its heavy focus on contextual elements outside the scope of the two men's relationship.

== Contents ==
The Emperor and the Wolf gives an account of the lives and careers of its two subjects: Akira Kurosawa and Toshiro Mifune. As a joint biography, Galbraith writes about the early lives of the two men, detailing Kurosawa's early artistic ambitions and journey through Toho studios, and Mifune's upbringing in Manchukuo and service in the air force during the Second World War. He details much of their work together and separately, providing extensive descriptions of the films they worked on, including biographies of other cast and crew members and extensive quotations from American critics on each of their films. Galbraith continues the narrative through the two men's separate projects up until their deaths in the late 1990s, providing an analysis of the two men's professional estrangement from each other—which he considers to be the result of an accumulation of insults over the course of their work together. Galbraith's biography is told through the prism of changes in Japan's film industry and society more broadly. The book also provides details about overseas distribution, and a broad reference of films.

== Development and publication ==
Galbraith conceived of the book when he discovered that no English-language biography of Akira Kurosawa existed. When he started to research the book he could not speak Japanese. As he continued to research Kurosawa's life and films, he increasingly found it increasingly difficult to write about the director without also talking about Mifune in depth. The book was written in five years. The book was published by Faber and Faber and has 823 pages. The Japanese translation was published in November 2015 and has 703 pages.

== Reception ==
Writing for The New York Times, Peter Biskind criticised the work for failing to properly link the two lives together, and structuring the book as though the two were parallel rather than interlinked. However, he appreciated the extensive research into aspects of Kurosawa and Mifune's careers that remained somewhat opaque, and considered the book to renew his appreciation for their filmographies. Philip French of The Observer considered the subject matter of the two men's relationship to be interesting, but opined that it was nestled within large amounts of context about the Japanese film industry and society. Writing for Variety magazine, Nicholas Riccard considered the book "a disappointment" for providing extensive details about Kurosawa and Mifune's filmography at the expense of writing about their private life. He praised the book for its level of research and the occasional interesting anecdote. Reviewing the Japanese translation of the work, Asahi Shimbun considered the book to be an interesting collection of testimonies and perspectives on the lives and careers of its subjects. However, the review considered its treatment of Mifune's life to not be very extensive.

== See also ==
- The Films of Akira Kurosawa – 1965 book by Donald Richie detailing the production, and analysing the films of Akira Kurosawa
- The Warrior's Camera – 1991 book by Stephen Prince analysing the films of Akira Kurosawa
