= Kiyoko Murata =

Japanese writer

- 村田 喜代子
- Born: 1945 (age 80–81); Yahata, Fukuoka, Japan
- Occupation: Writer
- Writing career
- Language: Japanese
- Genre: Fiction
- Notable works: Nabe no naka; Kokyō no wagaya; Yūjokō
- Notable awards: Akutagawa Prize; Noma Literary Prize; Yomiuri Prize; Medal with Purple Ribbon; Order of the Rising Sun

Kiyoko Murata (村田 喜代子, Murata Kiyoko; born 1945) is a Japanese writer. She has won the Akutagawa Prize, the Noma Literary Prize, and the Yomiuri Prize, among other literary prizes. The Government of Japan has awarded her the Medal with Purple Ribbon and Order of the Rising Sun, and she has been appointed to the Japan Art Academy. Her work has been adapted for film by Akira Kurosawa and Hideo Onchi.

== Early life and education ==
Murata was born in 1945 in Yahata, Fukuoka. After graduating from junior high school she worked a variety of jobs, including delivering newspapers, welding, working as a waitress in a coffee shop, and taking tickets at a movie theater. She married her husband, an engineer, in 1967, and began writing while raising her children.

== Career ==
In 1976 Murata received her first award for fiction when her story "Suichū no koe" ("Voice under Water"), about a woman attempting to help protect children after the loss of her own child, won the Kyushu Art Festival Literary Prize. After writing for several years and publishing her own private literary periodical, Murata was nominated for the Akutagawa Prize in the first half of 1986 for her story "Netsuai" ("Ardent Love"), a story about two boys engaged in a dangerous motorcycle race. The prize committee expressed concern about its initial publication in a minor journal, and she did not win. Murata was again nominated for the Akutagawa Prize in the second half of 1986 for her story "Meiyū" ("Allied Friends"), but again did not win.

Murata won the Akutagawa Prize on her third nomination. In the first half of 1987 her novella "Nabe no naka" ("In the Pot"), about a grandmother who entertains her visiting grandchildren with stories about their relatives, won the 97th Akutagawa Prize. Bungeishunjū then published "Nabe no naka" as the title story of Murata's first short story collection, which also included "Suichū no koe", "Netsuai", and "Meiyū". Akira Kurosawa wrote a screenplay based on "Nabe no naka", which he later filmed and released under the title Rhapsody in August. An English translation of "Nabe no naka", translated by Kyoko Iriye Selden, was published in a 2015 collection of fiction by Japanese women writers.

After winning the Akutagawa Prize, Murata continued publishing novellas and full-length novels, including her 1990 work Shiroi yama (白い山, White Mountain), which won the 29th Women's Literature Prize; the 1994 novel Warabi no kō (蕨野行), which was later adapted into the 2003 Hideo Onchi film Warabi no kō; the story Bōchō (望潮, Fiddler Crabs), which won the 29th Kawabata Yasunari Literature Prize; and the 1998 novel Ryūhi gyotenka (龍秘御天歌), which won a 49th MEXT Arts Award in the literature category.

In 2007 the Government of Japan recognized Murata's cultural contributions by awarding her a Medal with Purple Ribbon. Three years later her short story collection Kokyō no wagaya (故鄉のわが家, My Old Home), a set of stories told as the nightly dreams of a woman who has returned to her hometown to sell her family home, was published by Shinchosha. Kokyō no wagaya won the 63rd Noma Literary Prize.

Murata's 2013 novel Yūjokō (ゆうじょこう), a story about a teenage girl who is sold into prostitution by her parents and then helps organize a prostitute labor strike, won the 65th Yomiuri Prize in the fiction category. After winning the Yomiuri Prize, Murata again received national honors for her artistic contributions to Japanese culture, receiving the Order of the Rising Sun, Gold Rays with Rosette, in 2016, followed by a lifetime appointment as one of the 120 stipendiary members of the Japan Art Academy in 2017.

== Personal life ==
Around the time of the 2011 Tōhoku earthquake and tsunami, Murata was diagnosed with uterine cancer and sought radiation treatment, an experience she later used as the basis of her novel Yakeno made (焼野まで).

== Recognition ==
- 1976: 7th Kyushu Art Festival Literary Prize
- 1987: 97th Akutagawa Prize (1987上)
- 1990: 29th Women's Literature Prize
- 1998: 25th Kawabata Yasunari Literature Prize
- 1999: 49th MEXT Arts Award
- 2007: Medal with Purple Ribbon
- 2010: 63rd Noma Literary Prize
- 2014: 65th Yomiuri Prize (FY2013)
- 2016: Order of the Rising Sun
- 2017: Japan Art Academy
- 2019: Tanizaki Prize

== Film and other adaptations ==
- Rhapsody in August, 1991
- Warabi no kō, 2003

== Bibliography ==
=== Selected works in Japanese ===
- Nabe no naka (鍋の中), Bungeishunjū, 1987, ISBN 9784163099606
- Shiroi yama (白い山, White Mountain), Bungeishunjū, 1990, ISBN 9784163118505
- Warabi no kō (蕨野行), Bungeishunjū, 1994, ISBN 9784163146102
- Bōchō (望潮, Fiddler Crabs), Bungeishunjū, 1998, ISBN 9784163181806
- Ryūhi gyotenka (龍秘御天歌), Bungeishunjū, 1998, ISBN 9784163176802
- Kokyō no wagaya (故鄉のわが家), Shinchosha, 2010, ISBN 9784104041039
- Yūjokō (ゆうじょこう), Shinchosha, 2013, ISBN 9784104041046
- Yakeno made (焼野まで), Asahi Shimbun, 2016, ISBN 9784022513588

=== Works in English ===
- "Nabe no naka", trans. Kyoko Iriye Seldon, Japanese Women Writers: Twentieth Century Short Fiction, 2015
- A Woman of Pleasure, translated by Juliet Winters Carpenter, Counterpoint, 2024
