= Onchi =

Onchi (written: 恩地) is a Japanese surname. Notable people with the surname include:

- Hideo Onchi (恩地 日出夫, born 1933), Japanese film and television director
- Kōshirō Onchi (恩地 孝四郎, 1891–1955), Japanese print-maker
