= Santa Fe National Cemetery =

Historic veterans cemetery in Santa Fe, New Mexico

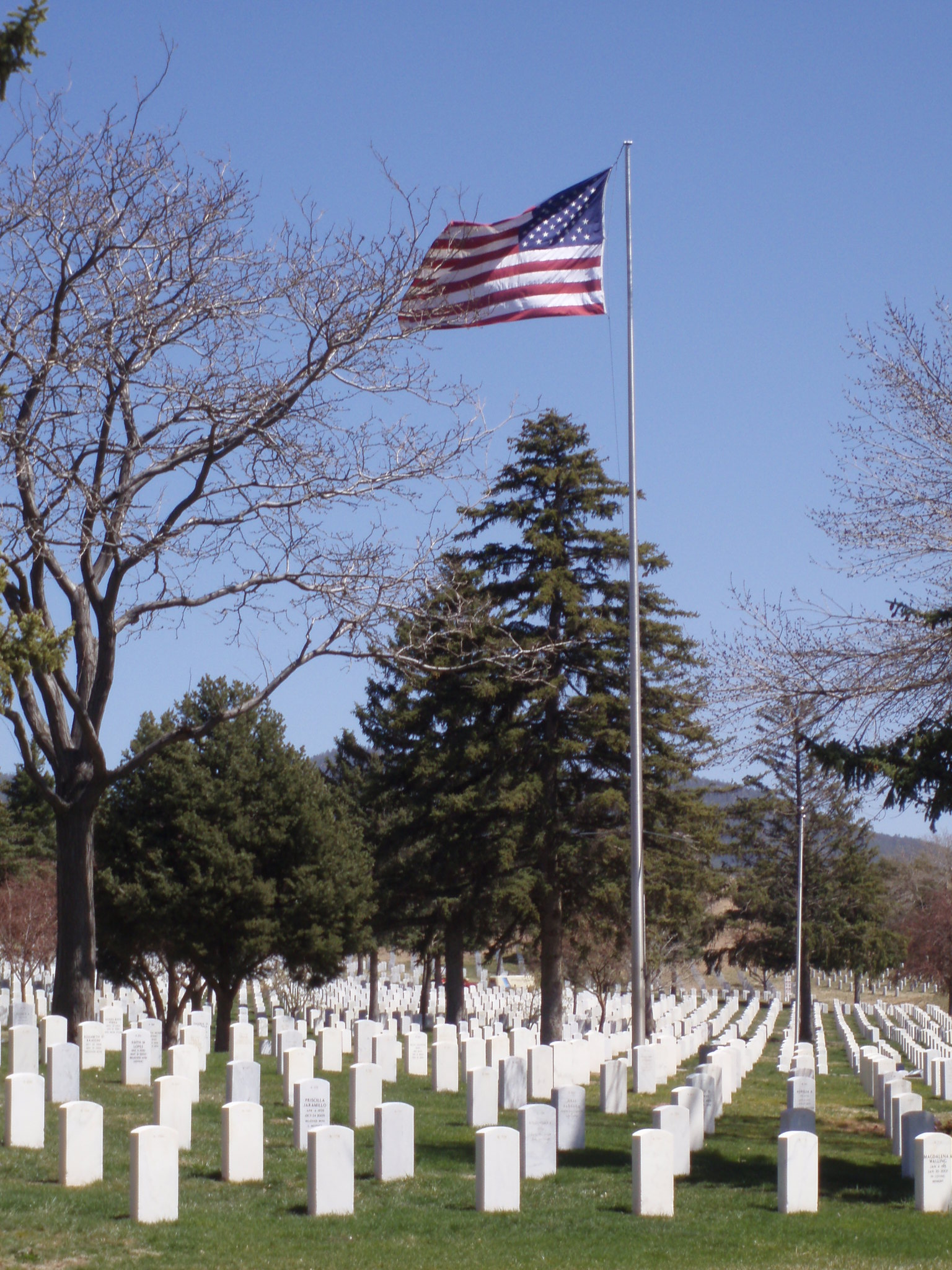
- Santa Fe National Cemetery, 2008
- Interactive map of Santa Fe National Cemetery

Details
- Established: 1870
- Location: Santa Fe, New Mexico
- Country: United States
- Coordinates: 35°41′54″N 105°56′56″W
- Type: United States National Cemetery
- Owned by: US Department of Veterans Affairs
- Size: 84.3 acres (34.1 ha)
- No. of interments: > 68,000
- Website: Official
- Find a Grave: Santa Fe National Cemetery
- Santa Fe National Cemetery
- U.S. National Register of Historic Places
- Location within New Mexico Location within the United States
- Location: 501 N. Guadalupe St., Santa Fe, New Mexico
- Coordinates: 35°41′54″N 105°56′56″W
- NRHP reference No.: 16000588
- Added to NRHP: September 6, 2016

Santa Fe National Cemetery is a United States National Cemetery in the city of Santa Fe, in Santa Fe County, New Mexico. It encompasses 84.3 acres (34.1 ha), and as of 2021, had 68,000 interments. Administered by the United States Department of Veterans Affairs, it is one of two national cemeteries in New Mexico (the other being Fort Bayard). It was listed on the National Register of Historic Places in 2016.

== History ==
The first known burial in the cemetery occurred in 1868 prior to the formal establishment of the land as a national cemetery. Though New Mexico only played a small part in the American Civil War, the cemetery was created after the war to inter the Union soldiers who died fighting there, primarily at the Battle of Glorieta Pass. The Roman Catholic Archdiocese of Santa Fe donated the land to the federal government in 1870. In 1876 its status was changed to a post cemetery, but in 1885 it became a national cemetery once again. The remains of Governor Charles Bent, the first American governor of the Territory of New Mexico, were among 47 bodies removed in 1895 from the old Masonic Cemetery in Santa Fe to the national cemetery. Between 1896 and 1912, the government moved remains here from several abandoned forts which had small post cemeteries including Apache and Grant in Arizona, Hatch and Wingate in New Mexico, and Duchesne in Utah among many other smaller posts. In 1953, the government acquired an additional 25 acres, bringing the cemetery to 34 acres. On June 23, 1987, the remains of 31 Confederate soldiers of the Texas Mounted Volunteers who were killed or died as a result of wounds during the Battle of Glorieta Pass were discovered in a mass grave on the battlefield. Three were identified and 28 who could not be identified were reburied in Section K together. In 2007 the remains of sixty-four federal soldiers and civilians discovered by the U.S. Bureau of Reclamation at the site of Fort Craig were relocated to here. In 2017 the Veterans Administration was unsuccessful in purchasing six acres of land adjacent to the cemetery and current estimates are that the site will be at capacity before 2030.

== Notable monuments ==
- Memorial made of granite and bronze dedicated to World War II Glider Pilots, erected in 1994.
- Memorial to "Women Who Served in the Navy" erected in 1995.
- The China-Burma-India Veterans Memorial, dedicated to World War II veterans, erected in 2002.
- The Navajo Code Talkers Memorial, erected in 2013.

== Notable interments ==
- Medal of Honor recipients
  - Watertender Edward A. Clary, for peace time service on board USS Hopkins
  - Private Edwin L. Elwood, for action in Arizona Territory during the Indian Wars
  - Specialist Four Daniel D. Fernandez, for action during the Vietnam War
  - Corporal Jacob Guenther, for action in Arizona Territory during the Indian Wars
  - Second Lieutenant Raymond G. Murphy USMC, for action in Korea on February 3, 1953
  - Corporal Thomas Murphy, US Army, for action in the Indian Wars
  - Yuma Indian and Army Scout Sergeant Y. B. Rowdy, for action in Arizona Territory during the Indian Wars
  - Captain Robert S. Scott, for action in World War II
  - Private First Class Jose F. Valdez, for action during World War II
- Others
  - Captain George Nicholas Bascom, Union officer killed in the Battle of Val Verde in 1862
  - Governor Charles Bent, first American governor of New Mexico Territory
  - Lieutenant Colonel José Francisco Chaves, Union Army officer during the American Civil War, U.S. Representative from the New Mexico Territory
  - John O. Crosby, musician, conductor and arts administrator, U.S. Army Veteran
  - Forrest Fenn, US Air Force pilot and the person behind the Fenn treasure.
  - Tony Hillerman, novelist and journalist
  - Van Dorn Hooker, University architect for the University of New Mexico
  - Patrick J. Hurley, Major General, World War I and World War II, U.S. Ambassador to China from (1944–45), and Secretary of War for President Herbert Hoover
  - James B. Jones, lieutenant governor of New Mexico
  - Jack P. Juhan, Marine Corps Major General
  - Oliver La Farge, 1930 Pulitzer Prize winning author of the novel Laughing Boy, Army Major during World War II
  - Francis W. Nye, Air Force Major General during World War II and Korean War
  - James P. Riseley, Marine Corps Lieutenant General
  - William G. Ritch, acting Governor of the New Mexico Territory, member of the Wisconsin State Senate
  - John Bristol Speer, attorney, judge, politician, and writer
  - Roy Tackett, Marine Corps Master Sergeant credited with the introduction of Sci-Fi to Japan and co-founder of Bubonicon
  - Valentin de Vargas, actor, U.S. Army veteran.
  - Rebecca Welles, American television and film actress
  - Frank Chee Willeto, Navajo code talker, Congressional Silver Medal recipient and Vice President of the Navajo Nation (1998–1999)

== See also ==
- National Register of Historic Places listings in Santa Fe County, New Mexico
