= Frank Chee Willeto =

American politician and Navajo code talker (1925–2012)

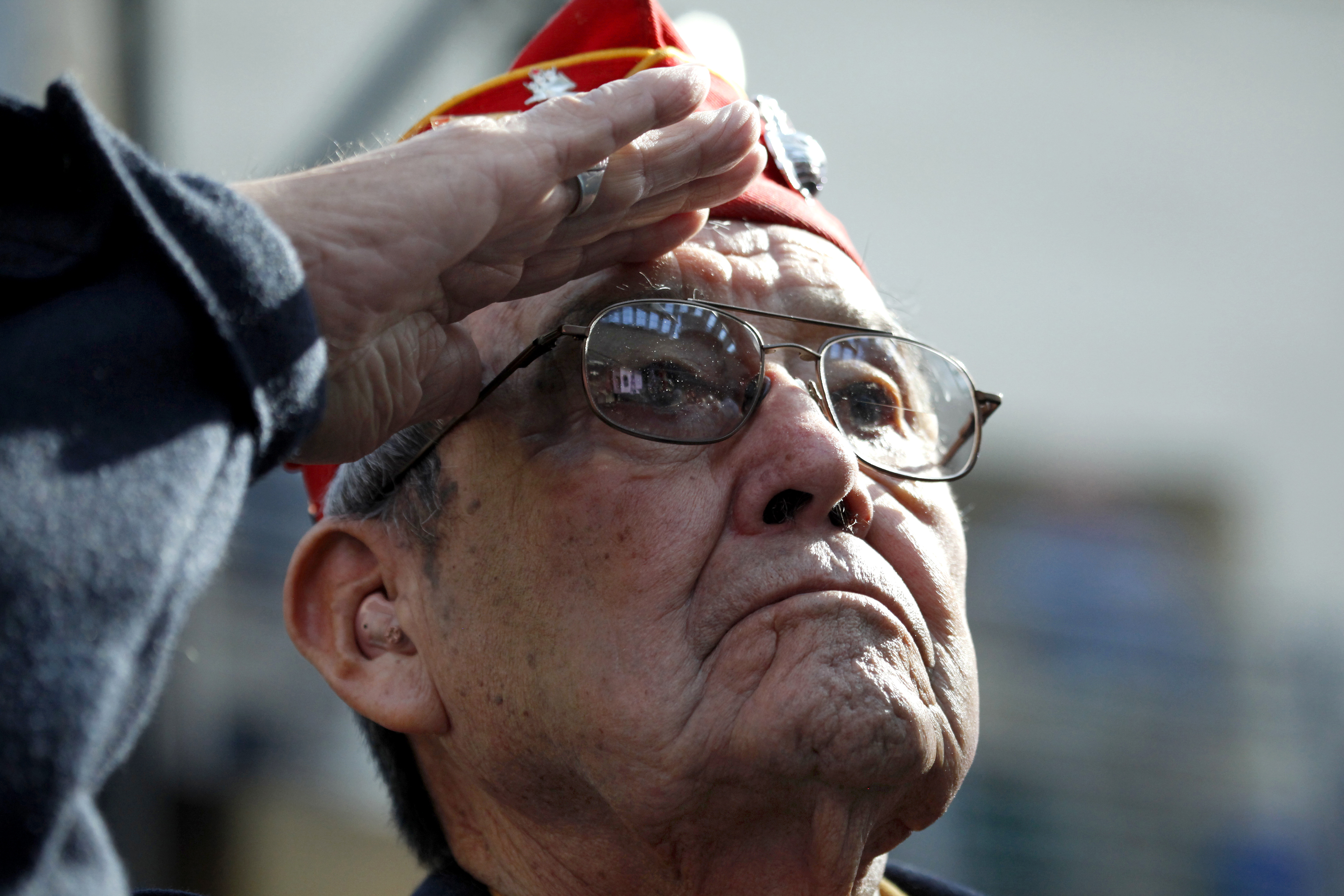

4th Vice President of the Navajo Nation
- In office August 1998 – January 12, 1999
- President: Milton Bluehouse, Sr.
- Preceded by: Milton Bluehouse, Sr.
- Succeeded by: Taylor McKenzie

Personal details
- Born: June 6, 1925 Crownpoint, New Mexico
- Died: June 23, 2012 (aged 87) Pueblo Pintado, New Mexico

Frank Chee Willeto (June 6, 1925 – June 23, 2012) was an American politician and Navajo code talker during World War II. Willeto served as the vice president of the Navajo Nation under President Milton Bluehouse, Sr. from his appointment in August 1998 until January 1999, when the Begaye administration took office.

== Early life ==
Willeto was born in Crownpoint, New Mexico, on June 6, 1925. According to the Navajo Times, Willeto was "Bit'ahnii (Folded Arms Clan), born for Tódích'íi'nii (Bitter Water Clan). His maternal great grandfather was Ta'neeszahnii (Tangle Clan) and his paternal family was Naakai dine'é (Mexican People Clan)."

== Code talker ==
He enlisted in the U.S. Marine Corps in January 1944 during World War II. Willeto joined the 6th Marine Division, serving in the Pacific Theater in Saipan and Okinawa as a Navajo code talker. The code talkers’ role in the war was not disclosed until 1968, when documents on the talkers were declassified. Willeto and other surviving Navajo code talkers were awarded the Congressional Silver Medal in 2001.

== Career ==
He returned to the Navajo Nation following the end of World War II. He was employed in the roads department of the Bureau of Indian Affairs from 1946 until 1974. Willeto then joined the United States Department of Education.

Willeto was elected to the Navajo Nation Council in 1974. He remained on the council until 1986, when he was elected as the president of the Pueblo Pintado Chapter. Willeto also served as a judge on the former Navajo Supreme Judicial Council, a precursor to the present-day Supreme Court of the Navajo Nation.

On July 23, 1998, Navajo Nation President Thomas Atcitty was removed from office by the Navajo Nation Council for ethics violations. Atcitty was succeeded by Milton Bluehouse, Sr., Atcitty's vice president, as interim president one day later. Bluehouse appointed Willeto as vice president of the Navajo Nation in August 1998. Together, Bluehouse and Willeto ran as running mates for a full, four-year term in the November 1998 presidential election. Kelsey Begaye won the general election and was inaugurated on January 12, 1999. Willeto remained vice president within the Bluehouse administration until Begaye took office.

== Later life ==
He remained active in public life. Willeto was a proponent of the new Tsé Yi’ Gai High School in Pueblo Pintado, New Mexico and the construction of a new bridge between the high school and Navajo Route 9.

Willeto was a frequent visitor to the eastern United States, especially Washington, D.C. In 2008, Willeto gave the blessing to mark the start of construction on the USS New Mexico (SSN-779) nuclear submarine in Newport News, Virginia. He was also invited to the White House to witness the signing of the Omnibus Public Land Management Act of 2009 by U.S. President Barack Obama. Most recently, Willeto appeared as a panelist for the United States Senate Committee on Indian Affairs' "The Way of the Warrior: Native Americans' Commitment to Country, Community, and Communication" panel on November 16, 2011, as part of National American Indian and Alaska Native Heritage Month.

Willeto died at his home in Pueblo Pintado on June 23, 2012, at the age of 87. New Mexico Governor Susana Martinez ordered flags to be flown at half-mast in Willeto's honor. Navajo Nation President Ben Shelly also offered all Navajo flags to be flown at half staff from June 25 until June 28. His funeral was held at the Tseဴ Yi’ Gai High School in Pueblo Pintado. Willeto was buried at Santa Fe National Cemetery in Santa Fe, New Mexico, June 29, 2012, at a ceremony attended by 150 people, including Governor Martinez.
