= Warabi no kō =

- Film poster

Japanese name
- Kanji: 蕨野行
- Kana: わらびのこう
- Directed by: Hideo Onchi
- Screenplay by: Hisashi Watanabe
- Based on: Warabi no kō by Kiyoko Murata
- Produced by: Mitsuru Itō
- Starring: Etsuko Ichihara; Mina Shimizu; Reisen Ri; Renji Ishibashi
- Cinematography: Shoji Ueda
- Edited by: Nobuo Ogawa
- Music by: Toshiro Saruya
- Distributed by: Toei Company
- Release date: October 4, 2003 (Japan)
- Running time: 124 minutes
- Country: Japan
- Language: Japanese

Warabi no kō (Japanese: 蕨野行), also known as To the Bracken Fields, is a 2003 Japanese film directed by Hideo Onchi. It is based on the novel of the same name by Kiyoko Murata.

== Cast ==
- Etsuko Ichihara
- Mina Shimizu
- Reisen Ri
- Renji Ishibashi

== Awards and nominations ==
28th Hochi Film Award

- Won: Best Director - Hideo Onchi
