= Daniel D. Fernández =

United States Army soldier

Daniel Fernández
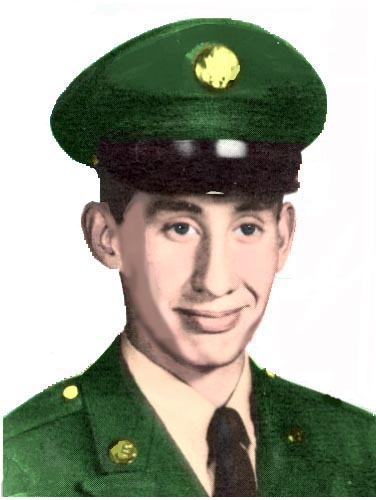
- Daniel D Fernández
- Born: June 30, 1944; Albuquerque, New Mexico, U.S.
- Died: February 18, 1966 (aged 21); Cu Chi District, Hậu Nghĩa Province, Republic of Vietnam
- Burial place: Santa Fe National Cemetery, Santa Fe, New Mexico
- Military career
- Allegiance: United States of America
- Branch: United States Army
- Service years: 1962–1966
- Rank: Specialist Four
- Units: 5th Infantry Regiment (Mechanized), 25th Infantry Division
- Conflicts: Vietnam War †
- Awards: Medal of Honor; Purple Heart

Daniel D. Fernández (June 30, 1944 – February 18, 1966) was a United States Army soldier in the Vietnam War who received the U.S. military's highest decoration, the Medal of Honor, for his actions in Hậu Nghĩa province, Republic of Vietnam, in February 1966.

== Early years ==
Born in Albuquerque, New Mexico, on June 30, 1944, Fernández grew up in nearby Los Lunas. He had two younger brothers, Peter and James, and a sister, Rita.

Fernández joined the Army from Albuquerque in 1962, and by 1966, he was on his second tour of duty in Vietnam. During that deployment, Fernández served as a specialist four in Company C, 1st Battalion, 5th Infantry Regiment (Mechanized), 25th Infantry Division. On February 18, 1966, in Củ Chi, Hậu Nghĩa province, his 16-man patrol was ambushed by a Viet Cong rifle company and forced to fall back. Fernández and two others volunteered to follow a sergeant back to the ambush site and rescue a wounded soldier who had been left behind. After reaching the injured man, the sergeant was shot in the knee and Fernández took over command of the patrol. All five men were pinned down by heavy fire when a rifle grenade landed in their midst. In the scramble to get away from the device, Fernández accidentally kicked it closer to the rest of the group. He then shouted "move out", jumped over the immobile sergeant, and threw himself on the grenade. Fernández was killed in the resulting explosion, but successfully saved the lives of his fellow soldiers.

For this action, Fernández was posthumously awarded the Medal of Honor in November 1966. He was the first of nine Mexican Americans to receive the medal in Vietnam.

== Medal of Honor ==
His official Medal of Honor citation reads:

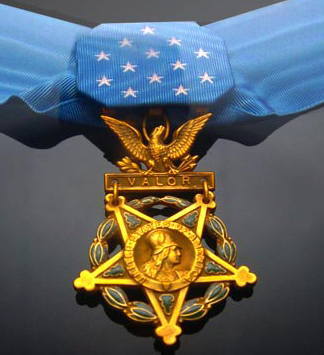

FERNANDEZ, DANIEL
Rank and organization: Specialist Fourth Class, U.S. Army, Company C, 1st Battalion, 5th Infantry (Mechanized) 25th Infantry Division
Place and date: Cu Chi, Hau Nghia Province, Republic of Vietnam, 18 February 1966
Entered service at: Albuquerque, New Mexico
Born: 30 June 1944, Albuquerque, New Mexico
Citation:

For conspicuous gallantry and intrepidity at the risk of his life above and beyond the call of duty. Sp4c. Fernández demonstrated indomitable courage when the patrol was ambushed by a Viet Cong rifle company and driven back by the intense enemy automatic weapons fire before it could evacuate an American soldier who had been wounded in the Viet Cong attack. Sp4c. Fernández, a sergeant and 2 other volunteers immediately fought their way through devastating fire and exploding grenades to reach the fallen soldier. Upon reaching their fallen comrade the sergeant was struck in the knee by machine gun fire and immobilized. Sp4c. Fernández took charge, rallied the left flank of his patrol and began to assist in the recovery of the wounded sergeant. While first aid was being administered to the wounded man, a sudden increase in the accuracy and intensity of enemy fire forced the volunteer group to take cover. As they did, an enemy grenade landed in the midst of the group, although some men did not see it. Realizing there was no time for the wounded sergeant or the other men to protect themselves from the grenade blast, Sp4c. Fernández vaulted over the wounded sergeant and threw himself on the grenade as it exploded, saving the lives of his 4 comrades at the sacrifice of his life. Sp4c. Fernández' profound concern for his fellow soldiers, at the risk of his life above and beyond the call of duty are in the highest traditions of the U.S. Army and reflect great credit upon himself and the Armed Forces of his country.

A Requiem Mass was held for Fernández at Los Lunas High School prior to his burial at Santa Fe National Cemetery. His name is inscribed on the Vietnam Veterans Memorial ("The Wall") on Panel 05E, Row 046.

== Honors ==
In Fernández's hometown of Los Lunas, a number of structures have been named in his honor. In March 1966, the newly opened Los Lunas Junior High School was renamed Daniel Fernández Junior High School in his honor (now Century High School, though the library retains his name). A park and recreation facility, Daniel D. Fernández Memorial Park, was dedicated in 1972. The local Veterans of Foreign Wars post bears his name, as does a road, Fernandez Street.

Students at Daniel D. Fernández Intermediate School wrote a biography of him, titled Man of Honor: The Story of Daniel D. Fernández, which was published in 2009 by Author House Publishing.

Produced by Señor Al Hurricane of New Mexico, there exists a biographical song entitled, "The Ballad of Dan Fernandez", by Sr. Roberto Martínez and Los Reyes de Albuquerque (Ray Flores, Miguel Archibeque, Isidro Chavez, George Benavidez, Roberto Martinez). This song tells a story of Sr. Fernández's U.S. military service and death. In Spanish (en Español), the song is entitled, "El Corrido de Daniel Fernandez", and the Spanish-language version of this song is recorded on the flip side of the 45 produced by Hurricane.

== See also ==
- List of Medal of Honor recipients for the Vietnam War
- List of Hispanic Medal of Honor recipients
