= Edwin L. Elwood =

American soldier in the U.S. Army

- Born: 1847; St. Louis, Missouri, United States
- Died: September 13, 1907 (aged 60); Santa Fe, New Mexico, United States
- Burial place: Santa Fe National Cemetery
- Military career
- Allegiance: United States of America
- Branch: United States Army
- Service years: c. 1868–1870
- Rank: Private
- Unit: 8th U.S. Cavalry
- Conflicts: Indian Wars; Apache Wars
- Awards: Medal of Honor

Edwin L. Elwood (1847 – September 13, 1907) was an American soldier in the U.S. Army who served with the 8th U.S. Cavalry during the Indian Wars. He took part in campaigns against Cochise and the Apache Indians in the Arizona Territory in the late-1860s and was one of thirty-two men who received the Medal of Honor for gallantry during the fighting in the Chiricahua Mountains, known as the "Campaign of the Rocky Mesa", on October 20, 1869.

== Biography ==
Edwin L. Elwood was born in St. Louis, Missouri, in 1847. He later moved to San Jose, California, where he enlisted in the U.S. Army. He was sent to the Arizona Territory for frontier duty with the 8th U.S. Cavalry and took part in the Apache Wars. Elwood was among the soldiers under Lieutenant William H. Winters who pursued Cochise and the Apache Indians following the massacre of stage coach passengers en route to Tucson, and an attack on a group of cowboys in the Sulphur Springs Valley, on October 5, 1868. The cavalrymen finally confronted Cochise at his stronghold in the Chiricahua Mountains, in what would become known as the "Campaign of the Rocky Mesa", on October 20, 1869. Elwood was shot in the right side of his chest while battling the Apaches but recovered from his injuries. He was cited for "gallantry in action" in this engagement and was among the 32 members of the 1st and 8th U.S. Cavalry who received the Medal of Honor on February 14, 1870. Elwood died in Santa Fe, New Mexico, on September 13, 1907, at the age of 60. He was interred at the Santa Fe National Cemetery.

== Medal of Honor citation ==
Rank and organization: Private, Company G, 8th U.S. Cavalry. Place and date: At Chiricahua Mountains, Ariz., October 20, 1869. Entered service at: California. Birth: St. Louis, Mo. Date of issue: February 14, 1870.

Citation:

Gallantry in action.

== See also ==
- List of Medal of Honor recipients for the Indian Wars
