= Van Dorn Hooker =

American architect

- Architect Van Dorn Hooker in 2001 visits the UNM duck pond, a project that he championed in the campus master plan
- Born: Van Dorn Hooker Jr. August 22, 1921; Carthage, Texas
- Died: June 14, 2015 (aged 93); Albuquerque, New Mexico
- Resting place: Santa Fe National Cemetery
- Education: B.Arch. 1947 University of Texas at Austin; Postgraduate 1951 University of California-Berkeley; Doctor in Fine Arts (honorary) 2010, University New Mexico
- Known for: UNM Architect, 1963–1987
- Spouse(s): Marjorie Mead Hooker, 1947–2006 (her death)
- Children: Ann Hooker Clarke; Van Dorn Hooker III; John Hardy Hooker
- Awards: Regents Recognition Medal 1985, University New Mexico

Van Dorn Hooker (August 22, 1921 – June 14, 2015) was an American architect and the University Architect for the University of New Mexico from 1963 to 1987.

== Early life and education ==
Hooker was born September 22, 1921, in Carthage, Texas, the son of Van Dorn and Anne (née Wylie) Hooker. He graduated from the College of Marshall, in Marshall, Texas in 1940. During World War II, he served in the US Army Corps of Engineers and later in the USAAF 25th Bombardment Squadron 1943 – 1945, stationed in India; in his spare time he was a cartoonist for Army news publications, and painted aircraft nose art.

After discharge, he obtained a Bachelor of Architecture degree at the University of Texas at Austin (UT) in 1947, and that same year married his university sweetheart, Marjorie ("Peggy") Mead, who was also the first woman to receive a B.Arch. Degree from UT. Their honeymoon took them to New Mexico, where they first became familiar with the campus of the University of New Mexico (UNM) with its unique Pueblo Revival architecture.

== Career ==
Hooker was hired by the Santa Fe firm of Meem, Zehner, Holien and Associates in 1951. John Gaw Meem, who became Hooker's mentor, was UNM's preferred consulting architect, designing nearly all of some 30 campus buildings in the Pueblo Revival style between 1933 and 1957.

In 1955 Van Dorn partnered with John W. McHugh in a new practice, McHugh, Hooker, Bradley P. Kidder and Associates; his wife Peggy also became one of the associates. One of his projects was the original 1957 open-air theatre for the Santa Fe Opera. During this period he also served on the Archdiocese of Santa Fe's building committee, and developed an expertise in the restoration of adobe churches, including San Francisco de Asís Mission Church at Ranchos de Taos.

=== At UNM ===
In 1963 he left private practice to become UNM's first University Architect. During his 24-year tenure some 75 buildings were added, extended or remodelled on the campus, and UNM received more than 30 design awards for landscapes and buildings. He is recognized for his success at maintaining the pueblo revival style that prevails on the UNM campus. Hooker designed few of these buildings himself; his role was oversight and management of the campus development, during a period of great expansion of both curriculum and enrolment. He assembled teams of architects and engineers for this purpose, and was greatly involved in the landscaping, pedestrianization and traffic management of the spaces between buildings, on a main campus which was hemmed in by the surrounding city.

=== Other activities ===
Following his retirement in 1987, Hooker was a consultant to the New Mexico Legislation Council Service on renovation of the New Mexico State Capitol Building in Santa Fe, through 1991. He was also a watercolor artist and photographer; his paintings and images reflected his affection for New Mexico.

== Citations and awards ==
Hooker was a Fellow of both the American Institute of Architects and the Association of University Architects (AUA President, 1971). He received the 2007 Silver Medal for Lifetime Achievement, FAIA (AIA New Mexico).

Hooker received awards not only from architecture societies, but also from the City of Albuquerque, a conservation association, and the University of New Mexico:

- Honor Award – for Continued Support of Landscape Architecture, American Society of Landscape Architects, New Mexico Chapter, 1982
- Silver Medal – Development of the UNM Campus, AIA, Western Mountain Region, 1980
- Honor Award – For Service as President of the Society, New Mexico Society of Architects, 1973
- Merit Award – Equitable Way of Selecting Architects, New Mexico Society of Architects, 1984
- Certificate of Appreciation – Civic Beautification: Duck Pond and Children’s Psychiatric Center, City of Albuquerque, 1981
- Landscape Award – For Contributing to the Quality of Our Nation’s Environment, The Albuquerque Conservation Association (TACA), 1983
- Regents Recognition Medal – For Protecting and preserving the Unique Campus, UNM Board of Regents 1985

== Selected publications ==
- Only in New Mexico: An Architectural History of the University of New Mexico, The First Century 1889–1989, 2000, University of New Mexico Press, ISBN 0-8263-2135-6
- Centuries of Hands: An Architectural History of St. Francis of Assisi Church (Ranchos De Taos), 1996, Sunstone Press, ISBN 0-8653-4234-2
- Memories, Memorials, and Monuments: A Companion to “Only in New Mexico: An Architectural History of the University of New Mexico: The First Century 1889–1989”, by Ann Hooker Clarke (Author), Van Dorn Hooker (Author), 2019, Park Place Publications
