= The Films of Akira Kurosawa =

1965 academic book by Donald Richie

The Films of Akira Kurosawa is a 1965 academic book by Donald Richie, published by University of California Press. It discusses the films of Akira Kurosawa.

This was the first English-language academic book about a Japanese film director's works, and about Kurosawa's in particular. There were two more editions, in 1984 and 1996, covering more films, and the latter including edits to the last chapter. According to David Desser of the University of Illinois Urbana-Champaign stated that the work caters to a 1960s Westerner who did not have a lot of background on Japanese culture nor films from Japan.

== Reception ==
José M. de Vera, in a review of the first edition, stated that "we sometimes have the impression that Richie is all out to make things difficult" with a "less-experienced" person reading the book possibly having difficulty following the book; Vera contrasts this with The Japanese Movie: An Illustrated History, which he argues is much easier to follow.

In 1998 Desser stated that the work "remains" the highest quality method to examine Kurosawa's whole collection of works; according to Desser the second and third editions of the book had a "tacked-on" aura and he characterized that as being unfortunate.

== See also ==
- The Emperor and the Wolf – 2002 book by Stuart Galbraith IV detailing the lives, and analysing the films of Akira Kurosawa and Toshiro Mifune
- The Warrior's Camera – 1991 book by Stephen Prince analysing the films of Akira Kurosawa
