= The Warrior's Camera =

1991 nonfiction book by Stephen Prince

The Warrior's Camera: The Cinema of Akira Kurosawa
- Cover
- Author: Stephen Prince
- Language: English
- Publisher: Princeton University Press
- Publication date: 1991
- Dewey Decimal: 791.430233092
- LC Class: PN1998.3.K87 P75

The Warrior's Camera: The Cinema of Akira Kurosawa is a 1991 non-fiction book by Stephen Prince, published by Princeton University Press, discussing Akira Kurosawa's films from the beginning until 1985. Prior to the publication of this book, there was only one other scholarly book work, The Films of Akira Kurosawa, chronicling the whole collection of Kurosawa's works. An updated version detailing Kurosawa's late period making films was released after the director's death in 2005.

== Background ==
The book relies on sources from Western countries, and does not rely on Japanese sources.

== Contents ==
The book groups its content thematically while following a generally chronological approach. Organised into nine chapters in the revised and expanded edition, it works through the entirety of Kurosawa's filmography as a director, starting with Sanshiro Sugata. Prince employs a thematic approach, applying literary criticism in combination with an explanation of Kurosawa's cinematic grammar to analyse the development of his style; situating this in context that he draws from Kurosawa's life and information drawn in part from Donald Richie's notes.

== Reception ==
Joanne R. Bernardi of Ibaraki University stated that the book "is a valuable study".

Arthur Noletti, Jr. of Framingham State College described the book as "ambitious", and that it is "thoughtful, stimulating, and rigorous".

== See also ==
- The Emperor and the Wolf – 2002 book by Stuart Galbraith IV detailing the lives, and analysing the films of Akira Kurosawa and Toshiro Mifune
- The Films of Akira Kurosawa – 1965 book by Donald Richie detailing the production, and analysing the films of Akira Kurosawa
