= Robert S. Scott =

United States Army Medal of Honor recipient

Robert Sheldon Scott
- Born: November 30, 1913; Washington, D.C.
- Died: February 5, 1999 (aged 85); Santa Fe, New Mexico
- Burial place: Santa Fe National Cemetery
- Military career
- Allegiance: United States
- Branch: United States Army
- Service years: 1941–1966
- Rank: Colonel
- Units: 1st Battalion, 172nd Infantry Regiment, 43rd Infantry Division
- Conflicts: World War II
- Awards: Medal of Honor

Colonel Robert Sheldon Scott (November 30, 1913 – February 5, 1999) was a soldier of the United States Army who received the Medal of Honor for actions during World War II (1939/1941-1945). He was born in Washington, D. C., and graduated later from the University of New Mexico in 1937 with a degree in English. In September 1941, Scott was drafted into the U.S. Army. After attending Officer's Candidate School he received a commission.

Scott, who was a Second Lieutenant at the time of his action, was a member of the 172nd Infantry Regiment of the 43rd Infantry Division in the southwest Pacific Ocean, that successfully captured the Munda Point airstrip on the island of New Georgia, Solomon Islands from its Japanese defenders in the summer of 1943. On July 29, 1943 Japanese soldiers counter-attacked against the American assault on Morrison-Johnson Hill overlooking the airfield. Scott commanded the 3rd platoon, "C" Company, that he led into attack against the Japanese fortified position. 75 yards from the enemy soldiers, Scott became detached from the rest of his men. Despite being alone, being shot in the left hand and receiving a shrapnel wound to the head, Scott used the combination of his M1 carbine and grenades to kill 28 Japanese soldiers, causing the rest of the attacking soldiers to withdraw. Scott's colleagues consequently took the hill and later the airstrip.

Scott remained in the Pacific theatre after the New Georgia campaign and was discharged after the end of the war. He re-joined in 1947, serving in the Korean War (1950-1953), and rose to the rank of colonel before retiring in 1966.

He was awarded the Medal of Honor in October 1944 at Aitape, New Guinea. In 1997 New Mexico, his home state, declared November 30 Robert Scott Day in his honor. He died at his home in Santa Fe, New Mexico on February 5, 1999, aged 85.

He is buried in Santa Fe National Cemetery Santa Fe, New Mexico. His grave can be found in Plot: 9-460.

== Medal of Honor citation ==
Rank and organization: Captain (then Lieutenant), U.S. Army, 172d Infantry, 43d Infantry Division. Place and date. Near Munda Air Strip, New Georgia, Solomon Islands, 29 July 1943. Entered service at. Santa Fe, N. Mex. Birth: Washington, D.C. G.O. No.: 81, 14 October 1944.

For conspicuous gallantry and intrepidity at the risk of his life above and beyond the call of duty near Munda Airstrip, New Georgia, Solomon Islands, on 29 July 1943. After 27 days of bitter fighting, the enemy held a hilltop salient which commanded the approach to Munda Airstrip. Our troops were exhausted from prolonged battle and heavy casualties, but Lt. Scott advanced with the leading platoon of his company to attack the enemy position, urging his men forward in the face of enemy rifle and enemy machinegun fire. He had pushed forward alone to a point midway across the barren hilltop within 75 yards of the enemy when the enemy launched a desperate counterattack, which if successful would have gained undisputed possession of the hill. Enemy riflemen charged out on the plateau, firing and throwing grenades as they moved to engage our troops. The company withdrew, but Lt. Scott, with only a blasted tree stump for cover, stood his ground against the wild enemy assault. By firing his carbine and throwing the grenades in his possession he momentarily stopped the enemy advance using the brief respite to obtain more grenades. Disregarding small-arms fire and exploding grenades aimed at him, suffering a bullet wound in the left hand and a painful shrapnel wound in the head after his carbine had been shot from his hand, he threw grenade after grenade with devastating accuracy until the beaten enemy withdrew. Our troops, inspired to renewed effort by Lt. Scott's intrepid stand and incomparable courage, swept across the plateau to capture the hill, and from this strategic position 4 days later captured Munda Airstrip.

== See also ==
- List of Medal of Honor recipients
- List of Medal of Honor recipients for World War II
