= Roy Tackett =

American novelist

- Born: May 20, 1925; El Paso, Texas
- Died: May 23, 2003 (aged 78); Albuquerque, New Mexico, USA
- Burial place: Santa Fe, New Mexico
- Military career
- Allegiance: United States of America
- Branch: United States Marine Corps
- Service years: 1942–1962
- Rank: Master Sergeant
- Nickname: HORT
- Units: 1st Marine Division; MCRDPI
- Conflicts: World War II; *Battle of Guadalcanal; *Battle of Peleliu; *Battle of Okinawa
- Other work: Author co-founder Bubonicon

Roy Tackett (May 20, 1925 – May 23, 2003), also known as Horrible Old Roy Tackett, was a rifleman with the United States Marine Corps during World War II. He has been credited with introducing science fiction to Japan when he was stationed there as part of the American occupation.

== Career ==
During the early 1950s Tackett was a Drill instructor at Marine Corps Recruit Depot Parris Island. He retired in 1962 with 20 years of service and went on to co-found Bubonicon in 1969 with the writer Robert E. Vardeman. That same year he was the Guest of Honor at Westercon. He produced more than 100 issues of his fanzine Dynatron during the 1960s, and was the TransAtlantic Fan Fund winner for 1976.

Roy was the Fan Guest of Honor at the 1997 Worldcon in San Antonio, Texas. As part of the run up to the ceremony in San Antonio, Mojo Press released The Least Horrible of Roy Tackett which consisted of selected short stories he had written over the previous 50 years.

== Personal life ==
Roy Tackett died in 2003 of heart failure brought on by years of heavy smoking, and was buried in the Santa Fe National Cemetery along with his wife, and fellow Marine, of over 40 years, Crystal Tackett (1923–1989). In 2008, the science fiction writer and long time friend Jack Speer was buried nearby.
