= Hideo Onchi =

Japanese film and television director (1933–2022)

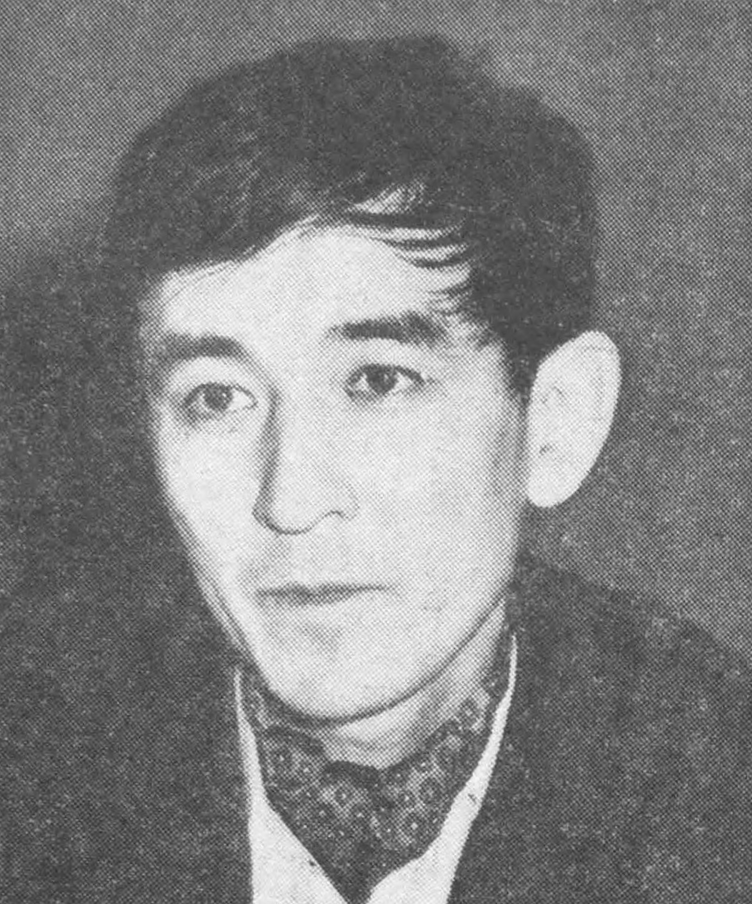
- Born: 23 January 1933; Tokyo, Japan
- Died: 20 January 2022 (aged 88)
- Occupation: Film director
- Years active: 1961-2003

Hideo Onchi (恩地日出夫, Onchi Hideo; 23 January 1933 – 20 January 2022) was a Japanese film and television director.

== Career ==
Born in Tokyo, Onchi graduated from Keio University and joined the Toho studios. He debuted as a director with Wakai ōkami (1961), and first made a name for himself directing youth films such as Izu no odoriko (1967). After turning freelance, he also worked in Japanese television, serving for instance as the main director for Kizu darake no tenshi, an influential TV drama from the 1970s.

Onchi won the award for Best Director at the 28th Hochi Film Award for Warabi no kō. He died from lung cancer on 20 January 2022, at the age of 88.

== Filmography ==
- Wakai ōkami (1961)
- Izu no odoriko (1967)
- Toward the Terra (1980)
- Warabi no kō (2003)
