= Bubonicon =

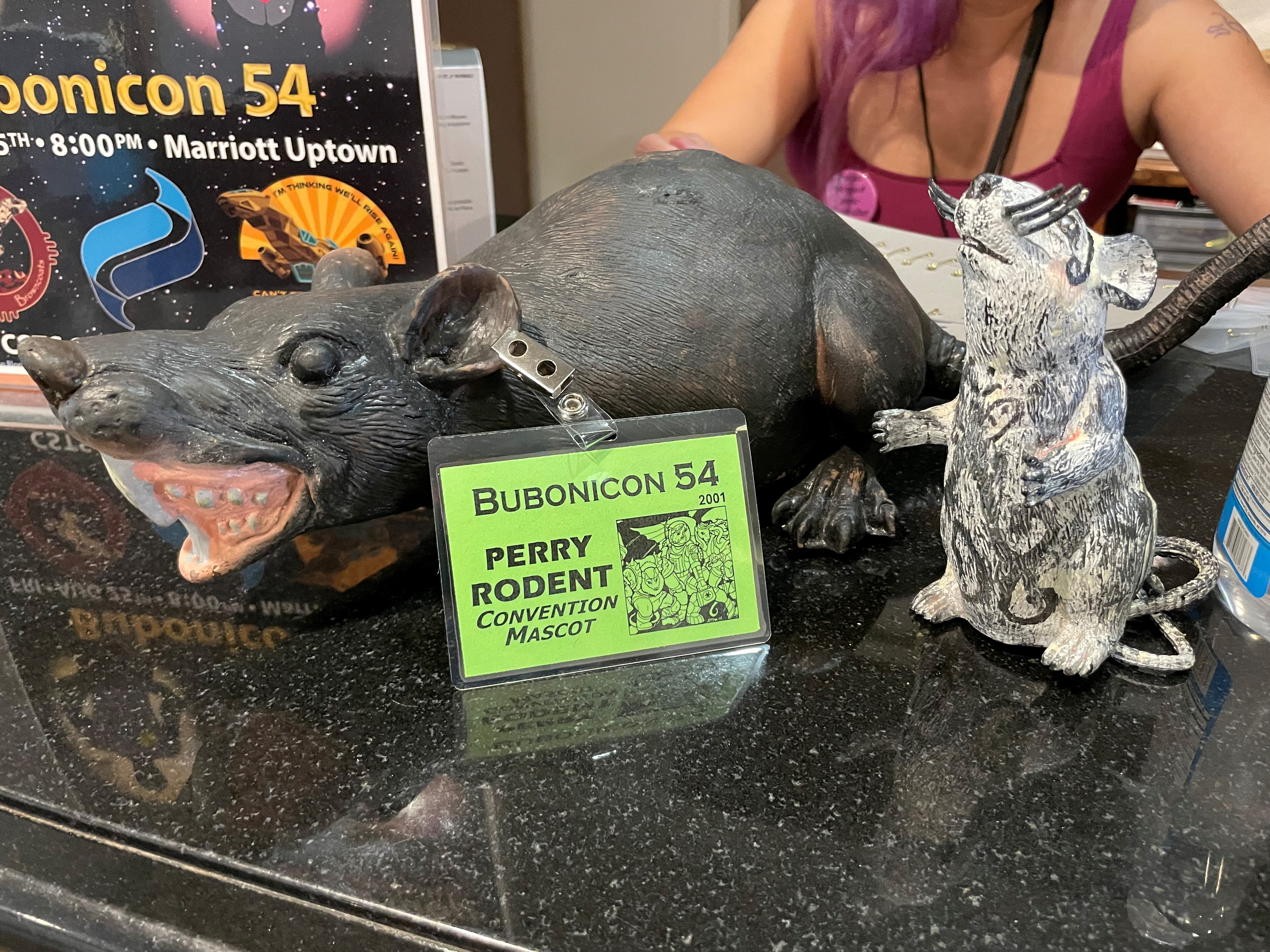
- Perry Rodent, the official mascot of Bubonicon.
- Status: Active
- Genre: Science fiction
- Venue: Albuquerque Marriott
- Locations: Albuquerque, New Mexico
- Country: United States
- Inaugurated: 1969
- Attendance: 721 (2024) / 980 (2013)
- Organizer: Albuquerque Science Fiction Society
- Website: http://www.bubonicon.com

Bubonicon is an annual multigenre convention in Albuquerque, New Mexico, typically held during the last weekend of August.

== History ==
Bubonicon was first held in 1969 as a literary science fiction gathering in Albuquerque called NewMexiCon. Authors Roy Tackett and Robert E. Vardeman were two of the key figures in establishing and promoting Bubonicon in its early days. It grew from a gathering of 20 in 1969, to 50 people attending in 1971, to over 100 people attending Bubonicon 5 in 1973. 1973 also introduced Bubonicon's mascot, Perry Rhodent. The name Bubonicon, not officially adopted until 1971, is a nod to Albuquerque's long history of bubonic plague outbreaks, with Perry Rhodent a continuation of this theme. In 1976, one of Bubonicon's longest running traditions, the Green Slime Awards, was started in order to honor the worst in Science Fiction from the previous year.

The convention began to include science lecturers, often from nearby Sandia National Laboratories and the University of New Mexico. Lectures included topics from physics to microbiology and encompassed fiction and fantasy of all media.

In the 1990s, Bubonicon averaged three hundred people in attendance. 2003's gathering marked the first time when over four hundred people attended.

Bubonicon 42, held in 2010 at the Albuquerque Grand Airport Hotel, featured a theme based on Douglas Adams' The Hitchhiker's Guide to the Galaxy. Honored guests included authors Peter David and Mario Acevedo.

In 2012, Bubonicon attendance was 700, at the new larger venue, Marriott Hotel, at Louisiana Blvd and I40. The theme was based on the Mayan Apocalypse idea of the "End of the World as We Know It." In 2013, attendance reached its peak at 980 with the theme of "Wonder Women".

Bubonicon was canceled in 2020 in response to the Covid-19 Pandemic and was "virtual" in 2021, with the ability to stream events ranging from book discussions to scientific presentations offered by members of the University of New Mexico. 2022 witnessed the return to in-person gatherings, although with the smallest attendance the convention had experienced since 2008.
