= Stephen Prince =

American film critic, historian, and theorist (1955–2020)

Stephen Robert Prince (September 13, 1955 – December 30, 2020) was an American film critic, film historian and film theorist. He was a Professor of Communication Studies and was a Professor of Cinema at Virginia Polytechnic Institute and State University ("Virginia Tech"). His books include The Warrior's Camera: The Cinema of Akira Kurosawa (1991) and Savage Cinema: Sam Peckinpah and the Rise of Ultraviolent Movies (1998). Prince was frequently cited as an expert in East Asian cinema by Criterion and can often be heard in commentary tracks in their collections.

== Works ==
=== Original works ===
- The Warrior's Camera: The Cinema of Akira Kurosawa (1991, 2nd edition, 1999), Princeton University Press.
- Visions of Empire: Political Imagery in Contemporary American Films (1992), Praeger.
- Movies and Meaning: An Introduction to Film (1996; 6th Edition, 2012)
- Savage Cinema: Sam Peckinpah and the Rise of Ultraviolent Movies (1998), University of Texas Press.
- Screening Violence (2000), Rutgers University Press (Series: Rutgers Depth of Field Series).
- A New Pot of Gold: Hollywood under the Electronic Rainbow, 1980-1989 (2002), University of California Press (Series: History of the American Cinema, Book # 10)
- Classical Film Violence: Designing and Regulating Brutality in Hollywood Cinema, 1930–1968 (2003), Rutgers University Press.
- Firestorm: American Film in the Age of Terrorism (2009), Columbia University Press
- Digital Visual Effects in Cinema: The Seduction of Reality (2011), Rutgers University Press
- A Dream of Resistance: The Cinema of Kobayashi Masaki (2018), Rutgers University Press
- Digital Cinema (2019), Rutgers University Press.
- Apocalypse Cinema (2021 - published posthumously), Rutgers University Press.

=== As editor ===
- Sam Peckinpah's 'The Wild Bunch' (1998), Cambridge University Press (Series: Cambridge Film Handbooks).
- The Horror Film (2004), Rutgers University Press.
- American Cinema of the 1980s: Themes and Variations (2007), Rutgers University Press (Series: Screen Decades: American Culture/American Cinema)

=== DVD & Blu-ray commentary ===
- Commentary on Red Beard (2001), The Criterion Collection.
- Commentary on Ikiru (2003), The Criterion Collection.
- Commentary on Ran (2003), The Masterworks Edition.
- Commentary on Stray Dog (2003), The Criterion Collection.
- Commentary on Kagemusha (2004), The Criterion Collection.
- Commentary on Yojimbo (2006), The Criterion Collection.
- Commentary on Sanjuro (2006), The Criterion Collection.
- Commentary on Sword of Doom (2005), The Criterion Collection.
- Commentary on High and Low (2008), The Criterion Collection.
- Commentary on The Hidden Fortress (2013), The Criterion Collection.
- Commentary on Kwaidan (2015), The Criterion Collection.
- Commentary on The Grand Duel Arrow Video
