= Stuart Galbraith IV =

American film historian and critic

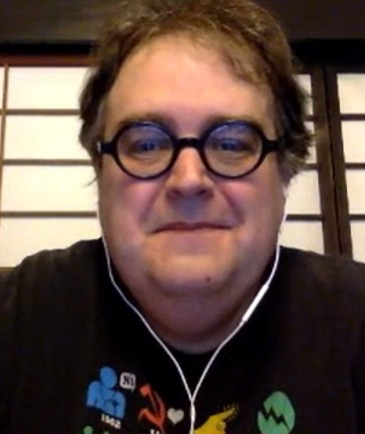
- Born: December 29, 1965; Detroit, Michigan, U.S.
- Occupations: Film historian, film critic
- Spouses: Anne Sharp (m. 1990; div. 1994); Yukiyo Nishi (m. 2001)
- Writing career
- Years active: 1997–present
- Subjects: Japanese film, anime

Stuart Eugene Galbraith IV (born December 29, 1965) is an American film historian, film critic, essayist, and audio commentator.

== Early life and education ==
Raised in Livonia, Michigan, Galbraith first worked professionally as a film reviewer and long-running home video columnist for The Ann Arbor News. In 1993, Galbraith moved to Los Angeles, California, where he eventually earned an M.A. from the University of Southern California's School of Cinema-Television.

== Career ==
=== Archive and early publishing work ===
After graduation, Galbraith worked as an archivist for the USC-Warner Bros. Archives, and later worked at the Warner Bros. Corporate Archives before writing The Emperor and the Wolf, a joint biography of Japanese director Akira Kurosawa and actor Toshiro Mifune, and the first biography of either man published outside Japan. As with Monsters Are Attacking Tokyo!, the 800-page book featured original interviews with collaborators including Shinobu Hashimoto, Kyoko Kagawa, Takeshi Kato, Yoshiro Muraki, Masaru Sato, and Senkichi Taniguchi.

After that book's publication, Galbraith returned to archive work, as a "film detective" for MGM, tracking down the original camera negatives to more than three dozen "lost" films.

=== Film scholarship and media work ===
Galbraith's Japanese Science Fiction, Fantasy, and Horror Films, the first English-language book about the genre, was published in 1994, and was soon followed by The Japanese Filmography.

Galbraith's 1998 book Monsters Are Attacking Tokyo! The Incredible World of Japanese Fantasy Films was an oral history of the genre, told by such filmmakers as Kinji Fukasaku, Jun Fukuda, Kihachi Okamoto, and Noriaki Yuasa, and actors Mie Hama, Kumi Mizuno, and Akira Takarada.

On DVD, Galbraith's essays have accompanied Criterion's three-disc Seven Samurai, Optimum's Rashomon, and BCI Eclipse's The Quiet Duel. He was an associate producer for the DVDs of the classic poolroom drama The Hustler and Sidney Lumet's The Verdict. He provided audio commentary (with director Richard Fleischer) for the Special Edition DVD of Tora! Tora! Tora!, and interviewed Oscar-winning cinematographer Vilmos Zsigmond for his audio commentary track for The Sadist. Galbraith's audio commentary for Classic Media's Invasion of Astro-Monster was released in 2007 and nominated for a Rondo Hatton Award.

=== Move to Japan ===
In 2003, Galbraith moved to Kyoto, Japan. Until 2009 Galbraith published a monthly home video column for the English-language edition of the Daily Yomiuri. He also records narration and voice-over for industrial and educational films.

Galbraith's The Toho Studios Story was published in 2008, and Japanese Cinema, edited by Paul Duncan, was published by Taschen in 2009. Also in 2009 he recorded a commentary track for AnimEigo's Tora-san, Our Loveable Tramp.

=== Later work ===
Since August 2003, Galbraith has been a reviewer for the website DVD Talk, where he has published more than 1,900 reviews. Galbraith has been selected as a member of the Online Film Critics Society.

== Personal life ==
He is married to Yukiyo Nishi. Their daughter, Sadie, was born in 2007.

Galbraith is not directly related to Kilimanjaro Live music promoter Stuart Galbraith or former Ballyclare Comrades midfielder Stuart Galbraith.

== Bibliography ==
- Japanese Science Fiction, Fantasy, and Horror Films. McFarland. 1994. ISBN 0-89950-853-7.
- Motor City Marquees. McFarland. 1994. ISBN 0-7864-1143-0.
- The Japanese Filmography. McFarland. 1996. ISBN 0-7864-0032-3.
- Monsters Are Attacking Tokyo! The Incredible World of Japanese Fantasy Films. Feral House. 1998. ISBN 0-922915-47-4.
- The Emperor and the Wolf: The Lives and Films of Akira Kurosawa and Toshiro Mifune. Faber. 2002. ISBN 0-571-19982-8.
- The Toho Studios Story. Scarecrow Press. 2008. ISBN 978-0-8108-6004-9.
- Japanese Cinema. Taschen. 2009. ISBN 978-3-8228-3156-4.
- Ishiro Honda: A Life in Film, from Godzilla to Kurosawa. Special thanks. Wesleyan University Press. 2017.

== Screenplays ==
- Mifune: The Last Samurai (co-written with Steven Okazaki)
