= Yellow Magic Orchestra discography =

- Studio albums: 9
- Live albums: 15
- Compilation albums: 10
- Singles: 23

This is the discography of Japanese electronic music band Yellow Magic Orchestra (YMO).

== Studio albums ==
Year	Album details	Peak chart positions	
Year	Album details	JP	US
1978	Yellow Magic Orchestra: Released: November 25, 1978; Labels: Alfa Records; Formats: LP	17	81
1979	Solid State Survivor: Released: September 25, 1979; Labels: Alfa Records; Formats: LP	1	–
1980	×∞ Multiplies (a.k.a. Zoshoku): Released: June 5, 1980; Labels: Alfa Records; Formats: EP	1	177
1981	BGM: Released: March 21, 1981; Labels: Alfa Records; Formats: LP	2	–
1981	Technodelic: Released: November 21, 1981; Labels: Alfa Records; Formats: LP	4	–
1983	Naughty Boys: Released: May 24, 1983; Labels: Alfa Records; Formats: LP	1	–
1983	Service: Released: December 14, 1983; Labels: Alfa Records; Formats: LP	5	–
1993	Technodon: Released: May 26, 1993; Labels: Toshiba EMI; Formats: LP	2	–

== Live albums ==
- 1980 Public Pressure – Japan No. 1
- 1984 After Service – Japan No. 2
- 1991 Faker Holic (Transatlantic Tour 1979) – Japan No. 50
- 1992 Complete Service (mixed by Brian Eno) – Japan No. 37
- 1993 Technodon Live – Japan No. 12
- 1993 Live At The Budokan 1980 – Japan No. 87
- 1993 Live At Kinokuni-Ya Hall 1978 – Japan No. 55
- 1995 Winter Live 1981
- 1996 World Tour 1980 – Japan No. 59
- 1997 Live At The Greek Theatre 1979
- 2008 EUYMO – Yellow Magic Orchestra Live in London + Gijón 2008
- 2008 LONDONYMO - Yellow Magic Orchestra Live in London 15/6 08
- 2008 GIJÓNYMO – Yellow Magic Orchestra Live in Gijón 19/6 08
- 2015 No Nukes 2012
- 2025 YMO Trans Atlantic Tour London 10/16/1979
- 2025 YMO Trans Atlantic Tour Paris 10/18/1979

== Compilation albums ==
- 1980 X∞Multiplies
- 1982 YMO Best Selection
- 1984 Sealed
- 1987 Y.M.O. History
- 1992 Techno Bible
- 1992 Kyoretsu Na Rhythm
- 1995 Over Seas Collection
- 1999 YMO Go Home! : The Best of Yellow Magic Orchestra, (compiled by Haruomi Hosono)
- 2000 One More YMO: The Best of YMO Live (compiled by Yukihiro Takahashi)
- 2003 UC YMO: Ultimate Collection of Yellow Magic Orchestra (compiled by Ryuichi Sakamoto)
- 2005 L-R Trax: Live & Rare Tracks
- 2011 YMO (compiled by YMO)
- 2018 NEU TANZ (Towa Tei supervised and selected the songs, and Yoshinori Sunahara was in charge of remastering)
- 2025 YMO 1979 Trans Atlantic Tour Live Anthology

== Remix albums ==
- 1983 Naughty Boys Instrumental – Japan No. 18
- 1993 Hi-tech/No Crime (Yellow Magic Orchestra Reconstructed) (UK compilation of remixes by British artists)
- 1993 Technodon Remixes I (Japanese compilation of Technodon remixes)
- 1993 Technodon Remixes II (Japanese compilation of Technodon remixes)
- 1999 YMO Remixes Technopolis 2000-01 (Japanese compilation of remixes by Japanese artists)
- 2000 YMO Remixes Technopolis 2000-00 (Japanese compilation of remixes by Japanese artists)

== Singles ==
- "Firecracker" (1978, Japan; 1979, US, UK)
- "Yellow Magic (Tong Poo)" (1978, Japan; 1979, UK)
- "Computer Game" (1979, US, Canada, Europe) – UK No. 17, US No. 60
- "Cosmic Surfin" (1979, US)
- "La Femme Chinoise" (1979, Europe) (Lyrics: Chris Mosdell)
- "Technopolis" (1979, Japan) – Japan No. 9
- "Rydeen" (1980, Japan; 1982, UK) – Japan No. 15
- "Behind the Mask" (1979, US; 1980, UK, Italy) (Lyrics: Chris Mosdell)
- "Nice Age" (1980, UK, Netherlands) (Lyrics: Chris Mosdell)
- "Tighten Up (Japanese Gentlemen Stand Up Please)" (cover version of Archie Bell & the Drells hit; 1980, Japan, US, UK) – Japan No. 43
- "Cue" (1981, Japan, US)
- "Mass" (1981, Japan)
- "Taiso" (1982, Australia, Japan)
- "Pure Jam" (1982, Spain)
- "Kimi ni Mune Kyun" (1983, Japan) – Japan No. 2
- "The Spirit of Techno / Kageki na Shukujo" (1983, Japan) – Japan No. 15
- "Ishin Denshin (You've Got To Help Yourself)" (1983, Japan) – Japan No. 23
- "Every Time I Look Around (I Hear The Madmen Call)" (1983, Holland)
- Reconstructions EP (1992, UK)
- "Pocketful of Rainbows" (1993, Japan) – Japan No. 13
- "Be A Superman" (1993, Japan) – Japan No. 76
- "Rescue / Rydeen 79/07" (2007, Japan) – Digital download release: March 10, 2007, CD release: August 22, 2007
- "The City of Light / Tokyo Town Pages" (2008, Japan) – by HASYMO
- "Good Morning, Good Night" (2009, Japan) – by HASYMO

== Music videos ==
Year	Title	Director(s)
1978	"Yellow Magic (Tong Poo)"	
1978	"Computer Game"	
1979	"Technopolis"	
1979	"Rydeen"	
1981	"Taiso"	Haruomi Hosono, Norimasa Okumura
1983	"Kimi ni Mune Kyun"	Hajime Tachibana
