= Sealed (album) =

Box set by Yellow Magic Orchestra
- Released: December 21, 1984
- Recorded: July 1978 – October 1983
- Genre: Contemporary classical; electronic rock; electronica; jazz fusion; new wave; synthpop
- Label: Alfa Records

Yellow Magic Orchestra compilation chronology
YMO Best Selection (1982)	Sealed (1984)	YMO History (1987)

Sealed is a compilation boxed set by Yellow Magic Orchestra. Released to "seal" the band, it is a four-part release, with one record/tape with songs by each member of the band, plus one for group compositions. Each copy is numbered and contains two booklets containing comments by the band regarding their career and "spreading out", an illustrated discography and song lyrics; it also comes with a poster of the band and a "Spreading Out Commemorative Certificate". When reissued on CD in 1988, the set was pared down to just the songs and lyrics, the order of the discs was switched and it was full of typographical errors, as well as the omission of a few tracks.

== Track listing ==
All tracks are written by Haruomi Hosono, except where noted

Haruomi Hosono side A
No.	Title	Lyrics	Originally from	Length
1.	"Simoon"	Chris Mosdell	Yellow Magic Orchestra, 1978
2.	"Absolute Ego Dance"	instrumental	Solid State Survivor, 1979
3.	"Isomnia"	Mosdell	Solid State Survivor, 1979
4.	"Mass"	Hosono, trans. Peter Barakan	BGM, 1981

Haruomi Hosono side B
No.	Title	Lyrics	Originally from	Length
5.	"Graduated Grey" (灰色(グレイ)の段階 Gurei no Dankai)	Hosono, Barakan	Technodelic, 1981
6.	"Chaos Panic"	Hosono, Barakan	"Kimi ni, Mune Kyun." single, 1983
7.	"Lotus Love"		Naughty Boys, 1983
8.	"The Madmen" (マッドメン Maddomen)	Hosono, Barakan	Service, 1983

All tracks are written by Yukihiro Takahashi, except where noted

Yukihiro Takahashi side A
No.	Title	Lyrics	Originally from	Length
1.	"La Femme Chinoise" (中国女 Chūgoku Onna)	Mosdell	Yellow Magic Orchestra, 1978
2.	"Rydeen" (雷電 Raidīn)	instrumental	Solid State Survivor, 1979
3.	"Solid State Survivor"	Mosdell	Solid State Survivor, 1979
4.	"Ballet"	Takahashi, Barakan	BGM, 1981

Yukihiro Takahashi side B
No.	Title	Lyrics	Originally from	Length
5.	"Pure Jam" (ジャム Jamu)	Takahashi, Barakan	Technodelic, 1981
6.	"Camouflage"	Takahashi, trans. Barakan	BGM, 1981
7.	"Expected Way" (希望の路 Kibō no Michi)		Naughty Boys, 1983
8.	"Chinese Whispers"	Takahashi, Barakan	Service, 1983

All tracks are written by Ryuichi Sakamoto, except where noted

Ryuichi Sakamoto side A
No.	Title	Lyrics	Originally from	Length
1.	"Tong Poo" (東風 Ton Pū)	instrumental	Yellow Magic Orchestra, 1978
2.	"Technopolis"		Solid State Survivor, 1979
3.	"Behind the Mask"	Mosdell	Solid State Survivor, 1979
4.	"Citizens of Science"	Mosdell	X∞Multiplies, 1980
5.	"Music Plans"	Sakamoto, Barakan	BGM, 1981

Ryuichi Sakamoto side B
No.	Title	Lyrics	Originally from	Length
6.	"Prologue"	instrumental	Technodelic, 1981
7.	"Epilogue"	instrumental	Technodelic, 1981
8.	"Ongaku" (音楽)		Naughty Boys, 1983
9.	"Kai-Koh" (邂逅)		Naughty Boys, 1983
10.	"Perspective"	Sakamoto, Barakan	Service, 1983

All tracks are written by Yellow Magic Orchestra (Hosono/Takahashi/Sakamoto), except where noted

YMO side A
No.	Title	Lyrics	Music	Originally from	Length
1.	"Nice Age"	Mosdell	Sakamoto, Takahashi	X∞Multiplies, 1980
2.	"Multiplies"	instrumental	YMO, Elmer Bernstein	X∞Multiplies, 1980
3.	"Cue"	Hosono, Takahashi, trans. Barakan	Hosono, Takahashi	BGM, 1981
4.	"Taisō" (体操)			Technodelic, 1981
5.	"Key" (手掛かり Tegakari)	Hosono, Barakan	Hosono, Takahashi	Technodelic, 1981

YMO side B
No.	Title	Lyrics	Music	Originally from	Length
6.	"Kimi ni, Mune Kyun. (Uwaki na Vakansu)" (君に、胸キュン。 (浮気なヴァカンス))	Takashi Matsumoto		Naughty Boys, 1983
7.	"Focus"	Hosono, Barakan	Hosono, Takahashi	Naughty Boys, 1983
8.	"Kageki na Shukujo" (過激な淑女)	Matsumoto		non-album single, 1983
9.	"Shadows on the Ground"	Sakamoto, Takahashi, Barakan	Sakamoto, Takahashi	Service, 1983
10.	"You've Got to Help Yourself" (以心電信 Ishin Denshin)	Hosono, Barakan	Sakamoto, Takahashi	Service, 1983

== Charts ==
Year	Release	Chart	Peak position	Weeks	Sales
1984	LP	Oricon LP Chart	64	6	6,000
1988	Album	Oricon Albums Chart	93	1	3,000
		Japan			9,000
