= UC YMO: Ultimate Collection of Yellow Magic Orchestra =

Compilation album by Yellow Magic Orchestra
- Released: 6 August 2003
- Genre: Electropop
- Label: Sony Music Entertainment

UC YMO: Ultimate Collection of Yellow Magic Orchestra is a compilation album by Yellow Magic Orchestra. The songs were selected by keyboardist and pianist Ryuichi Sakamoto. The album was also released as a premium edition. The premium edition came with a long-sleeved white shirt emblazed with the yMo logo as well as a yMo bandana that the band wore on the 1980 world tour 'From Tokio to Tokyo', along with a special Liner Notes Booklet and an autographed print by drummer and sometimes singer, Yukihiro Takahashi. It was cataloged as MHCL 291-4 and sold in Japan for 21,000 yen.

== Track listing ==
All tracks arranged by YMO, except "Hirake Kokoro －Jiseiki－" by YMO & Kenji Omura and "Behind the Mask (Seiko Quartz CM Version)" by Ryuichi Sakamoto.

Disc 1
No.	Title	Lyrics	Music	Originally from	Length
1.	"Computer Game “Theme from The Circus”"		Haruomi Hosono, Ryuichi Sakamoto, Yukihiro Takahashi	Yellow Magic Orchestra, 1978	1:47
2.	"Firecracker"		Martin Denny	Yellow Magic Orchestra, 1978	4:51
3.	"Tong Poo" (東風 Ton Pū)		Sakamoto	Yellow Magic Orchestra, 1978	6:14
4.	"La Femme Chinoise" (中国女 Chūgoku Onna)	Chris Mosdell	Takahashi	Yellow Magic Orchestra, 1978	5:51
5.	"Technopolis" (Single Version)		Sakamoto	Solid State Survivor, 1979	3:51
6.	"Insomnia"	Mosdell	Hosono	Solid State Survivor, 1979	4:57
7.	"Rydeen" (雷電 Raidīn)		Takahashi	Solid State Survivor, 1979	4:24
8.	"Behind the Mask"	Mosdell	Sakamoto, Takahashi	Solid State Survivor, 1979	3:36
9.	"Solid State Survivor"	Mosdell	Takahashi	Solid State Survivor, 1979	3:59
10.	"Radio Junk" (Live at The Bottom Line in New York City)	Mosdell	Takahashi	Public Pressure, 1980	4:17
11.	"Jingle “Y.M.O.”"		Hosono, Sakamoto, Takahashi	X∞Multiplies, 1980	0:19
12.	"Nice Age"	Mosdell	Sakamoto, Takahashi	X∞Multiplies, 1980	3:46
13.	"Tighten Up (Japanese Gentlemen Stand Up Please!)"	Billy Buttier	Archie Bell	X∞Multiplies, 1980	3:41
14.	"The End of Asia"		Sakamoto	X∞Multiplies, 1980	1:32
15.	"Citizens of Science"	Mosdell	Sakamoto	X∞Multiplies, 1980	4:33
16.	"Jiseiki Hirake Kokoro" (磁性紀－開け心－) (Stereo Version)	Hosono	Sakamoto, Takahashi	Snakeman Show, 1981 (mono); World Tour 1980, 1996 (stereo)	3:25
Total length:					61:29

Disc 2
No.	Title	Lyrics	Music	Originally from	Length
1.	"Cue"	Hosono, Takahashi, Peter Barakan	Hosono, Takahashi	BGM, 1981	4:32
2.	"Ballet"	Takahashi, Barakan	Takahashi	BGM, 1981	4:32
3.	"U•T"		Hosono, Sakamoto, Takahashi	BGM, 1981	4:31
4.	"Gradated Grey" (灰色(グレイ)の段階 Gurei no Dankai)	Hosono, Barakan	Hosono	Technodelic, 1981	5:32
5.	"Taisō" (体操)	Hosono, Sakamoto, Takahashi	Hosono, Sakamoto, Takahashi	Technodelic, 1981	4:20
6.	"Lover, Come Back to Me" (恋人よ我に帰れ Koibito yo Ware ni Kaere)	Oscar Hammerstein II	Sigmund Romberg	Music Fair, 1982	1:03
7.	"Kimi ni, Mune Kyun. (Uwaki na Vakansu)" (君に、胸キュン。 （浮気なヴァカンス）)	Takashi Matsumoto	Hosono, Sakamoto, Takahashi	Naughty Boys, 1983	4:06
8.	"Chaos Panic"	Hosono, Barakan	Hosono	"Kimi ni, Mune Kyun." single, 1983	4:12
9.	"Ongaku" (音楽)	Sakamoto	Sakamoto	Naughty Boys, 1983	3:26
10.	"Lotus Love"	Hosono	Hosono	Naughty Boys, 1983	4:04
11.	"Kai-Koh" (邂逅)	Sakamoto	Sakamoto	Naughty Boys, 1983	4:26
12.	"Kageki na Shukujo" (過激な淑女)	Matsumoto	Hosono, Sakamoto, Takahashi	single, 1983	4:10
13.	"The Madmen" (マッドメン Maddomen)	Hosono, Barakan	Hosono	Service, 1983	4:40
14.	"You've Got to Help Yourself" (以心電信 Ishin Denshin)	Hosono, Barakan	Sakamoto, Takahashi	Service, 1983	4:43
15.	"Perspective"	Sakamoto, Barakan	Sakamoto	Service, 1983	5:14
16.	"M-16"		Hosono, Sakamoto, Takahashi	Propaganda, 1984	4:11
17.	"Pocketful of Rainbows" (ポケットが虹でいっぱい Poketto ga Niji de Ippai)	Fred Wise, Ben Weisman; Reiko Yukawa (translation)	Wise, Weisman	Technodon, 1993	4:59
18.	"Behind the Mask" (Seiko Quartz CM Version)		Sakamoto, Takahashi	Previously unreleased	2:15
Total length:					75:25

=== Digital release ===
On October 20, 2017, a 30-track digital version of the compilation was released to streaming services. This version omits track 16 from CD 1 (the stereo version of "Hirake Kokoro") as well as tracks 6, 16, 17 and 18 from CD 2 ("Lover Come Back To Me", "M-16", "Pocketful Of Rainbows" and the Seiko Quartz CM Version of "Behind The Mask").

== Personnel ==
- Haruomi Hosono - Bass guitar, Synthesizer/Synth Bass, Keyboards, Drum machines, Samplers, Electronics, Sequencer, Marimba, Vocals
- Ryuichi Sakamoto - Keyboards, Electric piano, Synthesizer, Vocoder, Drum machines, Samplers, Electronics, Percussion, Vocals
- Yukihiro Takahashi - Drums, Electronic drums, Cymbals, Drum machines, Samplers, Percussion, Vocals
- Hideki Matsutake - Modular synthesizers, Sequencer, Programming
- Chris Mosdell - Lyrics, Vocals on "Citizens of Science"
- Masayoshi Takanaka - Guitar on "La Femme Chinoise"
- Tomoko Nunoi (née Ebe) - Sexy Voice (Vocals) on "La Femme Chinoise"
- Makoto Ayukawa - Guitar on "Solid State Survivor"
- Akiko Yano - Keyboards & Vocals on "Radio Junk"
- Moichi Kuwahara - Voice on "Jingle “Y.M.O.”"
- Kenji Omura - Guitar on "Nice Age", "Tighten Up", "Citizens of Science" & "Hirake Kokoro －Jiseiki－"
- Sandii - Vocals on "Nice Age"
- Mika Fukui - Voice on "Nice Age"
- Katsuya Kobayashi - Voice on "Tighten Up"
- Masato Ibu - Voice on "Tighten Up" & "The End of Asia"
- Peter Barakan - Lyrics
- Mari Nakamoto - Vocals on "Lover, Come Back to Me"
- Takashi Matsumoto - Lyrics
- Bill Nelson - Guitar on "Chaos Panic", "Ongaku", "Lotus Love", "Kai-Koh" & "Kageki na Shujuko"
- Takeshi Fujii & Akihiko Yamazoe - Technical Assistance on "Kimi ni, Mune Kyun.", "Chaos Panic", "Ongaku", "Lotus Love", "Kai-Koh", "Kageki na Shujuko", "The Madmen", "You've Got to Help Yourself", "Perspective" & "M-16"
- Regency - Doo-wop on "Pocketful of Rainbows"
