= Winter Live 1981 =

WINTER LIVE 1981

Live album by Yellow Magic Orchestra
- Released: November 22, 1995
- Recorded: 22–24 December 1981
- Venues: Shinjuku Koma Theater, Kabukichō, Shinjuku, Tokyo
- Genres: Art rock; electronic rock; experimental; techno; synthpop
- Label: Alfa Music

Yellow Magic Orchestra chronology
LIVE AT KINOKUNI-YA HALL 1978 (1993)	WINTER LIVE 1981 (1995)	OVER SEAS COLLECTION (1995)

WINTER LIVE 1981 is a live album by Yellow Magic Orchestra. It was recorded during the band's 1981 tour of Japan during the winter season of November and December 1981. A set of performances were first released in Betamax and VHS in 1983, featuring illustrations by Yakov Chernikhov. This is the only YMO live album from the BGM/Technodelic era of the group (three songs are included in the ONE MORE YMO compilation, but this remains the only full music album to do so); although this album only features one song that wasn't in either BGM or Technodelic ("Cosmic Surfin'" from Yellow Magic Orchestra), YMO also performed "Technopolis" and "Rydeen" (both from Solid State Survivor), as well as more songs from BGM and Technodelic ("Ballet", "Seoul Music" and "Key") and the unreleased "Loop".

== Track listing ==
No.	Title	Lyrics	Music	Length
1.	"Loom" (来たるべきもの Kitaru Beki Mono)		Haruomi Hosono, Ryuichi Sakamoto, Yukihiro Takahashi, Hideki Matsutake	5:13
2.	"Prologue" (前奏 Zensō)		Sakamoto	3:10
3.	"Pure Jam" (ジャム Jamu)	Takahashi, Peter Barakan	Takahashi	4:19
4.	"Light in Darkness" (灯 Akari)		Sakamoto, Takahashi	4:18
5.	"Camouflage"	Takahashi, Barakan	Takahashi	4:45
6.	"Stairs" (階段 Kaidan)	Takahashi, Barakan	Takahashi	4:39
7.	"Neue Tanz" (新舞踊 Shin Buyō)	Hosono, Sakamoto, Takahashi	Hosono, Sakamoto, Takahashi	6:12
8.	"Happy End"		Sakamoto	5:07
9.	"Music Plans" (音楽の計画 Ongaku no Keikaku)	Sakamoto, Barakan	Sakamoto	5:03
10.	"Cue"	Hosono, Takahashi, Barakan	Hosono, Takahashi	4:38
11.	"Taisō" (体操)	Hosono, Sakamoto, Takahashi	Hosono, Sakamoto, Takahashi	5:13
12.	"Cosmic Surfin'"		Hosono	4:00
13.	"Epilogue" (後奏 Kōsō)		Sakamoto	4:20

== Personnel ==
- Haruomi Hosono – Bass, Keyboards, Vocals
- Ryuichi Sakamoto – Keyboards, Vocals, Drums, Megaphone
- Yukihiro Takahashi – Drums, Percussion, Electronic drums, Vocals, Keyboards
- Hideki Matsutake – Programming
