= EUYMO – Yellow Magic Orchestra Live in London + Gijón 2008 =

2008 live album compilation by Yellow Magic Orchestra

EUYMO Yellow Magic Orchestra Live in London + Gijón 2008

Live album / Box set by Yellow Magic Orchestra
- Released: December 10, 2008
- Recorded: 15 & 19 June 2008
- Venue: Meltdown festival on the Royal Festival Hall, London; Laboral Ciudad de la Cultura, Gijón, Asturias
- Genre: Electronic rock; electronica; jazz fusion; techno; synthpop
- Label: Avex Group, Rhythm Zone, commmons
- Producer: Haruomi Hosono, Ryuichi Sakamoto & Yukihiro Takahashi

Yellow Magic Orchestra chronology
UC YMO (2003)	EUYMO; Yellow Magic Orchestra Live in London + Gijón 2008 (2008)

Alternative cover
- LONDONYMO cover

Alternative cover
- GIJÓNYMO cover

EUYMO – Yellow Magic Orchestra Live in London + Gijón 2008 is a live album compilation released by Yellow Magic Orchestra on December 10, 2008. It collects two live double-disc YMO albums, LONDONYMO – Yellow Magic Orchestra Live in London 15/6 08 and GIJÓNYMO – Yellow Magic Orchestra Live in Gijón 19/6 08 (and also comes with a tour T-shirt). It is performed in the style that the group built up as Sketch Show and as HASYMO.

Unlike all other YMO live albums, these only have three songs from YMO albums (one from BGM, one from Naughty Boys and one from Service, as well as a song that YMO performed live but was not included in any of their albums). Most of the songs played are Sketch Show/HASYMO material (three songs from Audio Sponge, four from Loophole and the "Rescue / Rydeen 79/07" & "The City of Light / Tokyo Town Pages" singles), as well as songs from the individual members' solo careers (one from Hosono's Philharmony and one song each from Sakamoto's B-2 Unit, Illustrated Musical Encyclopedia and Chasm albums). Two tracks are performed in the way they were on the "Tribute to Haruomi Hosono" album (Hosono's "Sports Men" and Sketch Show's "Turn Turn"). Both albums are very similar, with the main distinction between them being GIJÓNYMO having its songs on a different order, fewer songs, and "Riot in Lagos" being performed differently.

== Track listing ==
=== LONDONYMO – Yellow Magic Orchestra Live in London 15/6 08 ===
Disc 1
No.	Title	Lyrics	Music	Length
1.	"You've Got to Help Yourself" (以心電信 Ishin Denshin)	Haruomi Hosono, Peter Barakan	Ryuichi Sakamoto, Yukihiro Takahashi	5:04
2.	"Sports Men"	Hosono, Giles Duke	Hosono (arr. Takahashi)	4:28
3.	"Fly Me to the River"	Hosono, Takahashi	Hosono, Takahashi	4:59
4.	"Mars"	Hosono, Takahashi	Hosono, Sakamoto, Takahashi	4:52
5.	"Flakes"	Takahashi	Hosono, Takahashi	5:34
6.	"Riot in Lagos"		Sakamoto	5:46
7.	"Ongaku" (音楽)	Sakamoto	Sakamoto	5:08
8.	"Rescue"	Hosono, Takahashi, Chiho Shibaoka	Hosono, Sakamoto, Takahashi	3:47
9.	"Turn Turn"	Hosono, Takahashi	Hosono, Takahashi (arr. Sakamoto & Cornelius)	4:52
10.	"Tokyo Town Pages"		Hosono, Sakamoto, Takahashi	5:07
11.	"The City of Light"	Sakamoto, Takahashi, Kyoko Amatatsu	Hosono, Sakamoto, Takahashi	4:43

Disc 2
No.	Title	Lyrics	Music	Length
1.	"Supreme Secret"	Hosono, Takahashi	Hosono, Sakamoto, Takahashi	4:12
2.	"Wonderful to Me"	Hosono, Takahashi	Hosono, Sakamoto, Takahashi	5:25
3.	"Tibetan Dance"		Sakamoto	5:08
4.	"War and Peace"	Arto Lindsay	Sakamoto	5:40
5.	"Rydeen 79/07" (雷電 79/07 Raidīn 79/07)		Takahashi	5:28
6.	"Chronograph"	Hosono, Takahashi	Hosono, Takahashi	5:24
7.	"Cue"	Hosono, Takahashi, Barakan	Hosono, Takahashi	4:51

=== GIJÓNYMO – Yellow Magic Orchestra Live in Gijón 19/6 08 ===
Disc 1
No.	Title	Lyrics	Music	Length
1.	"You've Got to Help Yourself" (以心電信 Ishin Denshin)	Hosono, Barakan	Sakamoto, Takahashi	5:04
2.	"Mars"	Hosono, Takahashi	Hosono, Sakamoto, Takahashi	4:50
3.	"Chronograph"	Hosono, Takahashi	Hosono, Takahashi	5:22
4.	"Flakes"	Takahashi	Hosono, Takahashi	5:32
5.	"Rescue"	Hosono, Takahashi, Shibaoka	Hosono, Sakamoto, Takahashi	3:45
6.	"Ongaku" (音楽)	Sakamoto	Sakamoto	5:07
7.	"Turn Turn"	Hosono, Takahashi	Hosono, Takahashi (arr. Sakamoto & Cornelius)	4:53
8.	"Tokyo Town Pages"		Hosono, Sakamoto, Takahashi	5:05
9.	"The City of Light"	Sakamoto, Takahashi, Amatatsu	Hosono, Sakamoto, Takahashi	4:41

Disc 2
No.	Title	Lyrics	Music	Length
1.	"Wonderful to Me"	Hosono, Takahashi	Hosono, Sakamoto, Takahashi	5:23
2.	"Tibetan Dance"		Sakamoto	5:05
3.	"Supreme Secret"	Hosono, Takahashi	Hosono, Sakamoto, Takahashi	4:12
4.	"War and Peace"	Lindsay	Sakamoto	5:42
5.	"Riot in Lagos"		Sakamoto	5:45
6.	"Rydeen 79/07" (雷電 79/07 Raidīn 79/07)		Takahashi	5:23
7.	"Cue"	Hosono, Takahashi, Barakan	Hosono, Takahashi	4:49

== Personnel ==
- Haruomi Hosono – Bass, Keyboards, Vocals, Production
- Ryuichi Sakamoto – Keyboards, Vocals, Production, Mixing
- Yukihiro Takahashi – Drums, Percussion, Vocals, Production
- Christian Fennesz – Guitar, Electronics
- Ren Takada – Steel guitar, Electronics
- Tomohiko Gondo – Computer Operation, Euphonium
- Adam Brown – Recording
- Fernando Aponte – Mixing
- Shigeo "MT" Miyamoto – Mastering
- Shoko Ise – Visuals
- Rama Lee – Photography
- Giles Dunn – Art Direction, Graphic Design, T-shirt Design
- Jens Janson – Graphic Design
