= After Service =

Live album by Yellow Magic Orchestra
- Released: February 22, 1984
- Recorded: December 12–13, 1983
- Venues: Nippon Budokan, Kitanomaru Park, Chiyoda, Tokyo
- Genres: Art rock; electro-funk; electronic rock; exotica; J-pop; new wave; synth-pop; techno
- Length: 82:21 (double-LP, double-CD); 71:04 (single-CD)
- Label: Alfa
- Producer: Haruomi Hosono

Yellow Magic Orchestra chronology
Service (1983)	After Service (1984)	Technodon (1993)

After Service is the second live album by Yellow Magic Orchestra, directly following their (at the time) final studio album, Service. The album features former ABC member David Palmer on additional drums. A film version was released alongside the album. After Service features "Radical Lady" (過激な淑女, "Kageki na Shukujo"), which was released in a studio version as a single, but does not feature on any of their albums (compilations excepted).

After Service was later expanded and remixed by Brian Eno under the title Complete Service.

== Track listing ==
=== Double-LP ===
All songs arranged by YMO.

Disc 1/Side A
No.	Title	Lyrics	Music	Length
1.	"Propaganda"		Yellow Magic Orchestra	1:53
2.	"Tong Poo" (東風 Ton Pū)		Ryuichi Sakamoto	5:06
3.	"Behind the Mask"	Chris Mosdell	Sakamoto, Yukihiro Takahashi	4:33
4.	"Solid State Survivor"	Mosdell	Takahashi	4:09
5.	"La Femme Chinoise" (中国女 Chūgoku Onna)	Mosdell	Takahashi	5:02
Total length:				20:43

Disc 1/Side B
No.	Title	Lyrics	Music	Length
1.	"Ongaku" (音楽)	Sakamoto	Sakamoto	3:27
2.	"Focus"	Haruomi Hosono, Peter Barakan	Hosono, Takahashi	3:47
3.	"Ballet"	Takahashi, Barakan	Takahashi	4:37
4.	"Wild Ambitions"	Hosono	Hosono, Sakamoto	5:15
5.	"Kai-Koh" (邂逅)	Sakamoto	Sakamoto	4:09
Total length:				21:15 (41:58)

Disc 2/Side A
No.	Title	Lyrics	Music	Length
1.	"Expecting Rivers" (希望の河 Kibō no Kawa)	Takahashi	Sakamoto, Takahashi	4:48
2.	"See-Through"	Barakan	YMO	3:40
3.	"Key" (手掛かり Tegakari)	Hosono, Barakan	Hosono, Takahashi	4:29
4.	"Technopolis"		Sakamoto	4:14
5.	"Rydeen" (雷電 Raidīn)		Takahashi	4:04
Total length:				21:15

Disc 2/Side B
No.	Title	Lyrics	Music	Length
1.	"You've Got to Help Yourself" (以心電信 Ishin Denshin)	Hosono, Barakan	Sakamoto, Takahashi	4:15
2.	"Kageki na Shujuko" (過激な淑女)	Takashi Matsumoto	YMO	4:21
3.	"Kimi ni, Mune Kyun. (Uwaki na Vakansu)" (君に、胸キュン。 （浮気なヴァカンス）)	Matsumoto	YMO	4:31
4.	"Firecracker"		Martin Denny	6:01
Total length:				19:08 (40:23) (82:21)

=== Single-CD release ===
No.	Title	Lyrics	Music	Length
1.	"Propaganda"		Yellow Magic Orchestra	1:53
2.	"Tong Poo" (東風 Ton Pū)		Ryuichi Sakamoto	5:07
3.	"Behind the Mask"	Chris Mosdell	Sakamoto, Yukihiro Takahashi	4:34
4.	"Solid State Survivor"	Mosdell	Takahashi	4:00
5.	"La Femme Chinoise" (中国女 Chūgoku Onna)	Mosdell	Takahashi	5:12
6.	"Ongaku" (音楽)	Sakamoto	Sakamoto	3:26
7.	"Ballet"	Takahashi, Barakan	Takahashi	4:38
8.	"Wild Ambitions"	Hosono	Hosono, Sakamoto	5:17
9.	"Expecting Rivers" (希望の河 Kibō no Kawa)	Takahashi	Sakamoto, Takahashi	4:46
10.	"Key" (手掛かり Tegakari)	Hosono, Barakan	Hosono, Takahashi	4:34
11.	"Technopolis"		Sakamoto	4:14
12.	"Rydeen" (雷電 Raidīn)		Takahashi	4:16
13.	"You've Got to Help Yourself" (以心電信 Ishin Denshin)	Hosono, Barakan	Sakamoto, Takahashi	4:18
14.	"Kageki na Shujuko" (過激な淑女)	Takashi Matsumoto	YMO	4:22
15.	"Kimi ni, Mune Kyun. (Uwaki na Vakansu)" (君に、胸キュン。 （浮気なヴァカンス）)	Matsumoto	YMO	4:31
16.	"Firecracker"		Martin Denny	5:56
Total length:				71:04

=== Complete Service ===
Disc 1
No.	Title	Lyrics	Music	Length
1.	"Propaganda" (Full Version)		YMO	5:42
2.	"Tong Poo" (東風 Ton Pū)		Sakamoto	5:17
3.	"Behind the Mask"	Mosdell	Sakamoto, Takahashi	4:39
4.	"Solid State Survivor"	Mosdell	Takahashi	4:46
5.	"La Femme Chinoise" (中国女 Chūgoku Onna)	Mosdell	Takahashi	5:10
6.	"Ongaku" (音楽)	Sakamoto	Sakamoto	3:30
7.	"Focus"	Hosono, Barakan	Hosono, Takahashi	3:48
8.	"Shadows on the Ground"	Sakamoto, Takahashi, Barakan	Sakamoto, Takahashi	4:27
9.	"Ballet"	Takahashi, Barakan	Takahashi	4:41
10.	"Perspective"	Sakamoto, Barakan	Sakamoto	5:09
11.	"Wild Ambitions"	Hosono	Hosono, Sakamoto	5:17
12.	"The Madmen" (マッドメン Maddomen)	Hosono, Barakan	Hosono	5:27
Total length:				57:53

Disc 2
No.	Title	Lyrics	Music	Length
1.	"Limbo"	Hosono, Takahashi, Barakan	Hosono, Takahashi	3:41
2.	"Chinese Whispers"	Takahashi, Barakan	Takahashi	4:17
3.	"Expecting Rivers" (希望の河 Kibō no Kawa)	Takahashi	Sakamoto, Takahashi	4:48
4.	"Kai-Koh" (邂逅)	Sakamoto	Sakamoto	4:09
5.	"See-Through"	Barakan	YMO	3:43
6.	"Key" (手掛かり Tegakari)	Hosono, Barakan	Hosono, Takahashi	4:35
7.	"You've Got to Help Yourself" (以心電信 Ishin Denshin)	Hosono, Barakan	Sakamoto, Takahashi	4:42
8.	"Firecracker"		Denny	5:23
9.	"Kageki na Shujuko" (過激な淑女)	Matsumoto	YMO	4:24
10.	"Kimi ni, Mune Kyun. (Uwaki na Vakansu)" (君に、胸キュン。 （浮気なヴァカンス）)	Matsumoto	YMO	4:47
11.	"Technopolis"		Sakamoto	4:14
12.	"Rydeen" (雷電 Raidīn)		Takahashi	4:44
Total length:				53:27 (111:20)

== Personnel ==
Track numbers based on the Complete Service sequencing

- Yellow Magic Orchestra – arrangements, electronics, keyboards, mixing engineers, producers
- Haruomi Hosono – bass (4–5, 11–14), lead vocals (7, 11–13, 16), backing vocals (3–4, 6, 9–10, 14, 17–19, 21–24)
- Ryuichi Sakamoto – lead vocals (3, 6, 8, 10–11, 16), backing vocals (4, 12, 14–15, 17–19, 21–24)
- Yukihiro Takahashi – electronic drums (2–4, 7, 12, 16, 20, 23–24), cymbals (2–4, 20, 23–24), lead vocals (4–9, 13–19, 21–22), backing vocals (3, 10, 23–24)

Guest musician

- David Palmer (ex-ABC) – electronic drums and cymbals (5–19, 21–22)

Staff

- Mitsuo Koike – recording and mixing engineer
- Akitsugu Doi and Shinji Miyoshi – assistant engineers
- Teppei Kasai (CBS/Sony Shinanomachi Studio) – mastering engineer
- Kazusuke Obi – A&R coordinators
- Tsuguya Inoue – art director
- Beans Suzi Sakamoto – design
- Kenji Miura – inside photo

== Credits ==
Tour Crew

- Planning: Makoto Sato and YMO
- Production: Makoto Sato and Tadsashi Katoh
- Stage design: Kappa Senoh
- Stage direction: Osamu Yamada
- Art direction: Tsuguya Inoue
- Light planning: Jiro Katsushiba
- Choreographer: Tsukio Kurotaki
- Hair and make-up: Chiaki Shimada, Kiyomi Yoshikawa (Ours), and Mikio Honda (Bijin)
- Stage staff: Takenori "Mansaku" Kubota, Terunobu Ohtsuka, Mariko Okabayashi, Satoru Ide (Create Osaka), Junji Kobayashi, Shoichi Katoh, Kazumi Hoshi, Masakatsu Yamada, Terunobu Tamaya, Yasutaka Nakano, Yoshio Kumada, Kazuo Kawakami (Kanai Ohdogu)
- Sound: Ken Kondo (Front), Hiroyuki "Ah So!" Matsura (Monitor), Noriyasu "Uchiumi" Nishiumi, Yoshiaki "Noisy" Nojima (Hibino Sound), Kohji "Shacho!" Sawai (Crewbie Office)
- Lighting: Takenori Hayakawa, Koyshin Suzuki, Yoshinori Kobyashi, Minoru Kobayashi, Toshiaki Hirasawa, Takashi Uehara, Kenji Muto, Kiyoto Hoshino, Sonoyo Nishikawa, Reiko Nihei, Masaki Hotei, Kazuhiko Koike (Stage Factory)
- Transportation: Tadashi Ohgawara, Kazuhito Miyamoto, Toshinobu Kiyobe, Mitsuo Shimada, Tsutomu Kobayashi, Tomio Maeda (Minegishi Unso)
- Instrument care: Akimitsu Sasagawa (Crewbie Office), Kohji Kanamaru (Yoroshita Music), Masanobu Tsuchiya (Office Intenzio)
- Tape operated and click mixed by: Takeshi Fujii (Yoroshita Music)
- Linn and Simmons operated by: Aki Yamazoe (Yoroshita Music)

Equipment Support

- TEAC Corp. (TEAC 48 Tape Recorder, DBX DX-40 Noise Reduction)
- Onkyo Corp. (Onkyo PW-33 Transmitter, PR-1 Receiver)
- Management: Yoichi Itoh, Junko Sugimura, Hiromitsu Fujisawa (Office Intenzio), Fumie Takahashi, Peter Barakan (Yoroshita Music)
- Tour conductor: Rima "Rimao" Yamashita (Yoroshita Music)
- Tour book compiled and edited by: Hiroma Shimizu
- Promotion: Kunio Tzutsu
- Dancers: Jacqueline Hurley, Clare Macnamara, Tina Stubbington, Nicole Matney (FOLIO)
- Executive producer: Hiroshi Okura (Yoroshita Music)

[Re-issue]

- Supervised by: Yuji Tanaka
- Remastering and edited by: Mitsuo Koike at Ast studio, Tokyo, July 1999
- Art direction and design: Takayuki Innami
- Design: Kazuhiro Nozawa

== Charts ==
Title	Year	Release	Chart	Peak position	Weeks	Sales
After Service	1984	LP	Oricon LP Chart	2	15	93,000
After Service	1984	Cassette	Oricon CT Chart	10	12	30,000
Complete Service	1992	Album	Oricon Albums Chart	37	3	20,000
After Service	2022	Album	Oricon Albums Chart	77	3	7,000
The Spirit of Techno / Kageki na Shukujo	1983	Single	Oricon Singles Chart	15	9	79,000
Total			Japan			229,000

== See also ==
- 1984 in Japanese music
