= Eric Denton =

Eric Denton may refer to:

- Eric James Denton (1923–2007), British marine biologist
- Eric Denton (musician), founding member of the early-80s new wave band The Monroes
- Eric Denton (soccer) (born 1978), American soccer player
- Eric Denton (Under the Dome), fictional character in the television series Under the Dome
