= Logic system =

Logic system may refer to:

- A type of Formal system
- Logic System, a musical project of Japanese composer and programmer Hideki Matsutake
