= Technodelic =

Studio album by Yellow Magic Orchestra
- Released: November 21, 1981
- Recorded: March 21 – October 13, 1981
- Studios: Alfa Studio "A", Shibaura, Minato, Tokyo
- Genres: Synth-pop; urban contemporary; R&B; techno; industrial; psychedelia; avant-garde; postmodern
- Length: 43:29
- Label: Alfa
- Producers: Haruomi Hosono; Yellow Magic Orchestra

Yellow Magic Orchestra chronology
BGM (1981)	Technodelic (1981)	Naughty Boys (1983)

Singles from Technodelic
- 1. "Pure Jam" Released: 1982; 2. "Taisō" Released: 1982

Alternative cover
- Cover used on most reissues

Professional ratings
Review scores
Source	Rating
AllMusic	4/5 stars
Analog Planet	10/10

Technodelic is the fifth studio album by Japanese electronic music band Yellow Magic Orchestra. Released in 1981, the album is notable for its heavy use of digital samplers, which were not commonly used until the mid-to-late 1980s, resulting in a more avant-garde sound compared to the group's previous work.

It is considered the first released album to feature mostly samples and loops, influencing the heavy use of sampling and looping in popular music. Yellow Magic Orchestra's approach to sampling music was a precursor to the contemporary approach of constructing music by cutting fragments of sounds and looping them using computer technology.

In 2008, Sonic Youth frontman Thurston Moore provided a cover of "Gradated Grey" for the Haruomi Hosono tribute album Strange Songbook (Tribute To Haruomi Hosono 2). In 2016, the Canadian post-punk group Preoccupations covered the track "Key" as a part of a 7" vinyl that came with pre-orders of their self-titled album alongside a cover of The Raincoats' 1979 track "Off-Duty Trip".

== Production ==
Most of the sampling was made with an LMD-649, a custom-built digital sampler developed by Toshiba-EMI engineer Kenji Murata. The LMD-649 was the first PCM digital sampler, capable of playing and recording PCM samples with a 12-bit audio depth and 50 kHz sampling rate, stored in 128 KB of dynamic RAM memory. It also had sampling drum machine capabilities. Notable samples used include Indonesian gamelan music and short looped vocals ("paa", "fuku", "chiki") for percussion in "Seoul Music", Indonesian kecak chanting in "Neue Tanz", and the final two tracks feature industrial factory noises. The LMD-649 was later used by other Japanese synthpop artists in the early 1980s, including YMO-associated acts such as Chiemi Manabe and Logic System in 1982.

The album also features use of speech through a two-way radio, a prepared piano, a Roland TR-808 drum machine (previously used in BGM), and Prophet-5 synthesizers. In another departure from previous albums, Haruomi Hosono has a more prominent role playing the bass guitar as opposed to playing bass lines on synthesizers (this trend will appear again on the album Service).

As with many of YMO's releases, song titles are printed in both Japanese and English. For "Seoul Music", the kanji "京城" are used, referring to Gyeongseong (경성; known as Keijou in Japan), the name of Seoul when Korea was under Japanese rule. "灯" refers to the light of a lantern. "Neue Tanz" is German for "New Dance", while "Taisō" is Japanese for "gymnastics" or "calisthenics".

For its single release, the track "Taisō" was given a music video directed by Haruomi Hosono and Norimasa Okumura. The video features the members of YMO, dressed in uniforms designed by Yukihiro Takahashi, along with Takahashi's then manager Hiromi Kanai performing calisthenics against various chroma key backdrops, parodying real-world televised calisthenics broadcasts in Japan.

== Track listing ==
Side one
No.	Title	Lyrics	Music	Length
1.	"Pure Jam" (ジャム; "Jam")	Yukihiro Takahashi; Peter Barakan	Takahashi	4:30
2.	"Neue Tanz" (新舞踊; "Shin buyou")	Yellow Magic Orchestra	YMO	4:58
3.	"Stairs" (階段; "Kaidan")	Takahashi, Barakan	Takahashi	4:14
4.	"Seoul Music" (京城音楽; "Keijou ongaku")	Ryuichi Sakamoto, Takahashi, Barakan	Sakamoto, Takahashi	4:46
5.	"Light in Darkness" (灯; "Tomoshibi")		Takahashi, Sakamoto	3:40

Side two
No.	Title	Lyrics	Music	Length
1.	"Taiso" (体操; "Taisō")	YMO	YMO	4:21
2.	"Gradated Grey" (灰色(グレイ)の段階; "Grey no dankai")	Haruomi Hosono	Hosono	5:33
3.	"Key" (手掛かり; "Tegakari")	Hosono, Takahashi, Barakan	Hosono, Takahashi	4:32
4.	"Prologue" (前奏; "Zensou")		Sakamoto	2:31
5.	"Epilogue" (後奏; "Kousou")		Sakamoto	4:21

== Personnel ==
Yellow Magic Orchestra – Arrangements, Electronics, Sampler, Mixing engineers, Producers

- Haruomi Hosono – Bass, Synth Bass, Keyboards, Vocals
- Ryuichi Sakamoto – Keyboards, Vocals
- Yukihiro Takahashi – Vocals, Drums, Electronic drums

Guest musicians

- Hideki Matsutake – Technical assistance
- Takeshii Fujii & Akihiko Yamazoe – Equipment
- Peter Barakan – Lyrics, Transceiver Voice on "Pure Jam"

Staff

- Shōrō Kawazoe – Executive Producer
- Mitsuo Koike – Recording & Mixing engineer
- Yoshifumi Īo – Assistant Engineer
- Hiroshi Yuasa (JVC Cutting Center) – Mastering engineer
- Kazusuke Obi – A&R Coordinator
- Yōichi Itō & Hiroshi Ōkura – Management
- Plan-New Werk – Creative Services
- Masayoshi Sukita – Art director, Photography

== Charts ==
Year	Release	Chart	Peak position	Weeks	Sales
1981	LP	Oricon LP Chart	4	14	76,000
1981	Cassette	Oricon CT Chart	13	15	42,000
2022	Album	Oricon Albums Chart	56	3	8,000
		Japan			126,000

== See also ==
- 1981 in Japanese music
