= BGM (album) =

Studio album by Yellow Magic Orchestra
- Released: March 21, 1981
- Recorded: January 15 – February 20, 1981
- Studios: Alfa Studio "A", Shibaura, Minato, Tokyo
- Genres: Experimental; ambient; synthwave; electronic rock; techno
- Length: 47:06
- Labels: Alfa; A&M
- Producer: Haruomi Hosono

Yellow Magic Orchestra chronology
x∞Multiplies (1980)	BGM (1981)	Technodelic (1981)

Singles from BGM
- 1. "Cue" / "U•T" Released: April 21, 1981; 2. "Mass" / "Camouflage" Released: September 5, 1981

BGM is the fourth studio album by Japanese electronic music band Yellow Magic Orchestra. Released on March 21, 1981, the album, whose title stands for "Background music", was produced by Haruomi Hosono. Recording started on January 15, 1981, in an effort to release the album by March 21, 1981.

It was one of the first albums to feature the Roland TR-808, the most influential early programmable drum machine, along with YMO member Ryuichi Sakamoto's solo album B-2 Unit (1980). YMO was the first band to use the device, featuring it on stage in 1980. In addition to the TR-808, this was also their first studio album recorded with the Roland MC-4 Microcomposer music sequencer. The album, particularly its use of the TR-808, was influential on the development of electronic, hip hop and dance music.

== Overview ==
"Music Plans"
"Music Plans" is an electro song demonstrating extensive use of the Roland TR-808 drum machine. It was influential on early hip hop music and was cited by Afrika Bambaataa as an influence.

"1000 Knives"
"1000 Knives" is an electro/techno rendition of Ryuichi Sakamoto's electronic track "Thousand Knives" (1978). YMO's 1980 Budokan performance of this track was one of the earliest uses of the TR-808 in a live performance.

=== Title and conception ===
The title stands for "Background music". However, Japanese TV and press advertising alternately used "Beautiful Grotesque Music". The album title was conceived by Haruomi Hosono in July 1980 while he and Yukihiro Takahashi were in West Berlin for the production of Kazuhiko Katō's album Utakata no Opera. Hosono stated his intent was that "it's dangerous, so keep your distance and listen to it like BGM", while Takahashi said the title was partly a retort to Western music critics who had dismissed YMO's music as "Muzak".

The album was primarily inspired by two records: Sakamoto's solo album B-2 Unit (1980) and Kato's Utakata no Opera (1980), in which Hosono and Takahashi had both participated as session musicians. When YMO was first formed, they had wanted to operate as a faceless, anonymous group, but the massive commercial success of Solid State Survivor had thrust their individual personalities into the spotlight, and from BGM onward, each member's distinct musical identity would be foregrounded.

Hosono considered BGM to be YMO's best album, citing its timeless sound and lyrical depth. Takahashi similarly rated it as their finest work, noting it was the first time they were able to express what they truly wanted to say through lyrics, and that the words and sound were perfectly united.

=== Sakamoto's creative differences ===
Ryuichi Sakamoto was often absent from the BGM recording sessions due to both poor physical and mental health and creative differences with Hosono over the interpretation of contemporary classical music. He notably refused to play on "Cue", and his distaste of the song was so strong that he refused to play the song's keyboard parts live, instead switching to drums while Takahashi played keyboards. When Hosono requested "a song like 'Thousand Knives'", Sakamoto's retort was to simply include an aggressive new arrangement of the original track itself. He also submitted "Happy End", a deliberately deconstructed dub reworking of a track he had already composed for his own solo single, and his only genuinely new composition for the album was "Music Plans".

=== Lyrics and Peter Barakan ===
Previous YMO albums had featured lyrics by Chris Mosdell, but starting with BGM, each band member wrote their own lyrics in Japanese. They wanted the lyrics in English to create emotional distance from the directness of the Japanese originals, but none of the three members could write English verse themselves. Peter Barakan, a British broadcaster who had recently joined YMO's management office as a copyright administrator, was pressed into service as translator. Barakan also served as a strict pronunciation coach, correcting the members' tendency to apply Japanese vowel patterns to English words. All three members later recalled being worked hard by him.

Due to the album's extremely tight production schedule, song titles were not finalized until one month before release, and the printing deadline for lyric cards was missed entirely. Barakan typed all the credits on a typewriter, and the actual lyrics and translations were published separately in the YMO BOOK OMIYAGE photo book (Shogakukan).

=== Recording ===
Alfa Records, YMO's record company, had installed a 3M 32-track digital recorder (the DMS) in its studio shortly before YMO started recording BGM — one of only two such machines in Japan at the time. Since Hosono was not fond of its overly sharp sound quality, he recorded all the rhythm sections for BGM on a TASCAM 80-8 analog recorder first and copied them with the 3M machine, resulting in the fuller, much compressed rhythm tracks — a technique later termed "tape compression". Sakamoto, however, was unenthusiastic, later recalling that "at the time, it felt wrong to be using poverty-artist methods in Alfa Records' state-of-the-art studio."

The 3M DMS's recording format was proprietary and incompatible with other manufacturers' equipment. No working DMS machines are known to exist in Japan today, and even if a functional unit were found overseas, the cost of operation would be prohibitive, making it effectively impossible to play back the original multitrack master tapes.

=== Equipment ===
The Sequential Circuits Prophet-5 became the primary synthesizer on this album, replacing the Moog III-c that had dominated earlier recordings. Sakamoto in particular pushed the Prophet-5 extensively, exploring its full range of possibilities. The music sequencer was upgraded from the Roland MC-8 to the MC-4. During recording sessions, the Roland TR-808 was left running in continuous loops, which the band played along to. Other equipment included the Minimoog, ARP Odyssey, and Roland Jupiter-8. Notably, almost no acoustic instruments were used on the album.

A strict mixdown rule limited each song to one and a half hours of mixing time.

=== Structure ===
All ten tracks have nearly uniform running times: eight tracks run approximately 4 minutes 30 seconds, and the remaining two approximately 5 minutes 20 seconds. This coincidentally aligns with John Cage's famous 4′33″, but Hosono stated that "it was all entirely unconscious".

It was one of the most expensive albums to produce at the time. The production budget was ¥51,250,000, equivalent to $604,000. The TR-808 cost the equivalent of $4,000 adjusted for inflation in 2021.

=== Promotion ===
A television commercial was produced for the album at a cost of ¥5 million, an extremely unusual expenditure for a music album at the time. The commercial was shot on February 14 at the Alfa Records headquarters, with Hosono dressed as a Buddhist monk, Takahashi as a police officer, and Sakamoto as a nurse, while Masato Ibu of Snakeman Show appeared as a newscaster.

=== Artwork ===
The album's cover was designed by Yukimasa Okumura using six spot colors. The back cover reproduces the carnet customs declaration for YMO's 1980 world tour, listing every piece of equipment they carried (handwritten "'80 World Tour" is visible).

This album also introduced the iconic "onsen mark" YMO logo — the group's name stylized as a Japanese hot spring map symbol. The mark originated from the members' exhaustion after their world tour, during which they reportedly kept saying they wanted to "go home and visit a hot spring".

== Reception and legacy ==
Professional ratings
Review scores
Source	Rating
AllMusic	3/5 stars
Analog Planet	9/10
Pitchfork	9.2/10
Stereo Review	Positive

When released in 1981, the album's reception was positive. Stereo Review described the recording as "crystalline" and the performance as "the twain meet", praising the album for its "remarkable" blend between "East and West", its "catchy tunes", its "ambitious collection of electronics" and for "pushing at the frontiers of electronic rock", but noted that this affected the album's accessibility.

In 2021, Noah Yoo of Pitchfork gave it a positive review. According to Yoo, BGM "presented a startlingly prescient glimpse into electronic music’s future." He noted "BGM hones in on the “techno” aspect of the groundbreaking trio’s “techno-pop,” channeling each member’s unique personality into a monument of electronic music history" which "is a foundation for all manner of “synthetic” music that would follow, from synth-pop and IDM to hip-hop and well beyond." He described "Rap Phenomena" as having "subtle echoes of its resonant groove and polyrhythmic vocal sample manipulation everywhere" in modern electronic music, "Happy End" as "a progenitor of the ambient techno that would emerge in the following decade from artists" such as Carl Craig or The Orb, "1000 Knives" and "Camouflage" as demonstrating the TR-808's "relentless mechanical hi-hats" and "crisp" claps later used in hip-hop and dance music for the next several decades, "Camouflage" and "U.T." as anticipating "the skittering drum programming" of Aphex Twin, "Mass" as anticipating the "ominous drama" of synthwave, and the ambient "Loom" as having "a patiently ascending, two-minute-long Shepard’s tone" that anticipated the THX trademark Deep Note.

Malachi Lui of Analog Planet also gave the album a positive review. He called it "the group’s most experimental, forward-thinking work" to date. He noted opening track "Ballet" has an IDM-like electronic soundscape that combines "electronic drums, persistent hi-hats, and sustained synths" with a "melancholic emptiness." He also described "1000 Knives" as a "techno re-recording" that "lacks the 1978 original’s subtleties," praises "Cue" for its "exuberant synth-bass with beautifully cold" synth melodies, and described the "slow, sweeping electronics" of "Loom" as "predictive of Aphex Twin’s Selected Ambient Works projects." He concluded "BGM’s influence is evident in most current electronic music" 40 years later and that "BGM, equally cutting edge as it is alluringly imperfect, will always sound like the past, present, and future."

Chuck Clenney of UnderMain Magazine noted the album's significance in the early history of hip hop, describing its "use of the 808 as an instrument, played with character and emotion" as "groundbreaking." He describes the 808-driven "Music Plans" as where "the beginnings of that funky, electronic boom-bap vibe of hip-hop beats start to emerge" and the similarly 808-driven "Rap Phenomena" as "an aural Australopithecus of electronic rap music." Hip hop pioneer Afrika Bambaataa cited the BGM tracks "Music Plans", "Ballet" and "Cue" as influences.

== Track listing ==
Side one
No.	Title	Lyrics	Music	Length
1.	"Ballet" (バレエ)	Yukihiro Takahashi, Peter Barakan	Takahashi	4:34
2.	"Music Plans" (音楽の計画; "Ongaku no keikaku")	Ryuichi Sakamoto, Barakan	Sakamoto	4:34
3.	"Rap Phenomena" (ラップ現象; "RAPPU genshō")	Haruomi Hosono, Barakan	Hosono	4:33
4.	"Happy End" (ハッピー・エンド)		Sakamoto	4:33
5.	"1000 Knives" (千のナイフ; "Sen no NAIFU")		Sakamoto	5:24

Side two
No.	Title	Lyrics	Music	Length
1.	"Cue" (キュー)	Takahashi, Hosono, Barakan	Takahashi, Hosono	4:33
2.	"U•T" (ユーティー)		Yellow Magic Orchestra	4:34
3.	"Camouflage" (カムフラージュ)	Takahashi, Barakan	Takahashi	4:34
4.	"Mass" (マス)	Hosono, Barakan	Hosono	4:32
5.	"Loom" (来たるべきもの; "Kitaru beki mono")		YMO, Hideki Matsutake	5:21

- All CDs released between 1984 and 1998 feature an alternate take of "Happy End", with audible differences throughout the second half of the track. The original version appears on all CD and later vinyl releases from 1999 onwards.

== Track notes ==
=== Side one ===
1. "Ballet" — The opening track sets the album's dark, bittersweet tone. The piano introduction is played by Sakamoto. The lyrics, written by Takahashi, evoke the atmosphere of Warsaw shrouded in fog and reference the painter Tamara de Lempicka. The train-like sound effects were created by Hosono. The French narration during the bridge is performed by Tomoko Nunoi. Additionally, Masakazu Tōgō of the folk duo Buzz contributes an uncredited vocal passage, singing in a "John Lennon-style" at Takahashi's specific request. Akiko Yano named "Ballet" as her single favorite YMO track.
2. "Music Plans" — Sakamoto's only new composition for the album. His vocal delivery reflects the frustration and creative slump he was experiencing during the recording sessions. A "click" noise is audible at approximately 3:30 — this is a data error from the 3M digital recorder, not an intentional sound effect.
3. "Rap Phenomena" — One of the earliest rap songs by a Japanese artist, created at a time when hip hop was not yet a widely recognized genre. The title is a pun on the paranormal phenomenon of spirit rapping, with Hosono rapping about the occult in a deadpan style. Hosono, who disliked the sound of his own voice, completely removed the low-frequency components from his vocal track. The repeating vocal loop in the interlude was created using physical tape loops rather than digital sampling. "Rap Phenomena" was an early attempt at electronic hip hop music.
4. "Happy End" — A dub-style deconstruction of the B-side of Sakamoto's solo single "Front Line" (April 1981). The melody is largely stripped away and the track is aggressively processed using dub techniques, making it nearly unrecognizable as the same composition on first listen. CDs released between 1984 and 1998 contain a different mix from the original LP; the original mix was restored on all releases from 1999 onward.
5. "1000 Knives" — A self-cover of the title track from Sakamoto's debut solo album Thousand Knives (1978), hastily included when the band could not finish a new song by the deadline. This version features a drier, more aggressive arrangement. A distinctive "biyoyoyo" sound audible in one channel near the end of the track was the result of a programming error by Hideki Matsutake, but Sakamoto decided it sounded better and kept it. The descending keyboard passage in the interlude was achieved using the Prophet-5's poly-to-mono mode switching function.

=== Side two ===
1. "Cue" — Later released as a single. See Cue (YMO song).
2. "U·T" — Also included as the B-side of the "Cue" single. Features distorted, processed voices of the band members discussing extraterrestrials.
3. "Camouflage" — Also included as the B-side of the "Mass" single.
4. "Mass" — Later released as a single. Features spoken word by Peter Barakan.
5. "Loom" — A reworking of "The Infinite Space Octave" by Hideki Matsutake. The Shepard tone — an auditory illusion of endlessly ascending pitch — was created by Matsutake using the E-mu Modular System, shifting ascending and descending tones across six octaves with a temporal offset to create the illusion of perpetual upward motion. Matsutake had been experimenting with the effect at a Sony studio in Roppongi when Hosono visited and heard it; years later, Hosono asked him to reproduce it for BGM. The water droplet sounds in the latter half of the track were generated using the calculated average pulse rate of the three band members. The track's slow, ascending tone anticipates the Deep Note, THX's audio logo, which would debut in 1983.

=== Roland TR-808 ===
The then brand new Roland TR-808, prior to the drum machine's official release in 1980, was rented out to YMO. One of the earliest uses of the TR-808 for a live performance was by Yellow Magic Orchestra in 1980 for the song "1000 Knives". The 808's chief engineer Tadao Kikumoto was unaware Roland had rented out the machine to YMO before release and was surprised to hear it on a live FM radio broadcast of YMO's Budokan 1980 performance. The TR-808's hand-clap sound was prominently featured on this album, notably on "1000 Knives" and "Music Plans".

== Personnel ==
Yellow Magic Orchestra – Arrangements, Electronics, Vocals, Voices on "U•T", Mixing engineers

- Haruomi Hosono – Bass, Synth Bass, Keyboards, Delays & Harmonizer on "U•T", Production
- Ryuichi Sakamoto – Keyboards, Vocoder
- Yukihiro Takahashi – Drums, Electronic drums

Guest musicians

- Hideki Matsutake – Programming
- Takeshii Fujii, Don Nagata & Tomoki Miyadera – Equipment Coordination
- Peter Barakan – Lyrics, spoken words on "Mass"
- Tomoko Nunoi (uncredited) – French Narration on "Ballet"

Staff

- Kunihiko Murai & Shōrō Kawazoe – Executive Producer
- Mitsuo Koike – Recording & Mixing engineer
- Yoshifumi Īo – Recording Engineer
- Kazusuke Obi – A&R Coordinator
- Plan-New Werk & Tsukuitoshinao – Creative Services
- Masayoshi Sukita – Photography

== Charts ==
Year	Release	Chart	Peak position	Weeks	Sales
1981	LP	Oricon LP Chart	2	19	175,000
1981	Cassette	Oricon CT Chart	4	21	100,000
2022	Album	Oricon Albums Chart	54	3	8,000
		Japan			283,000

== See also ==
- 1981 in Japanese music
