= The Monroes (American band) =

American new wave band

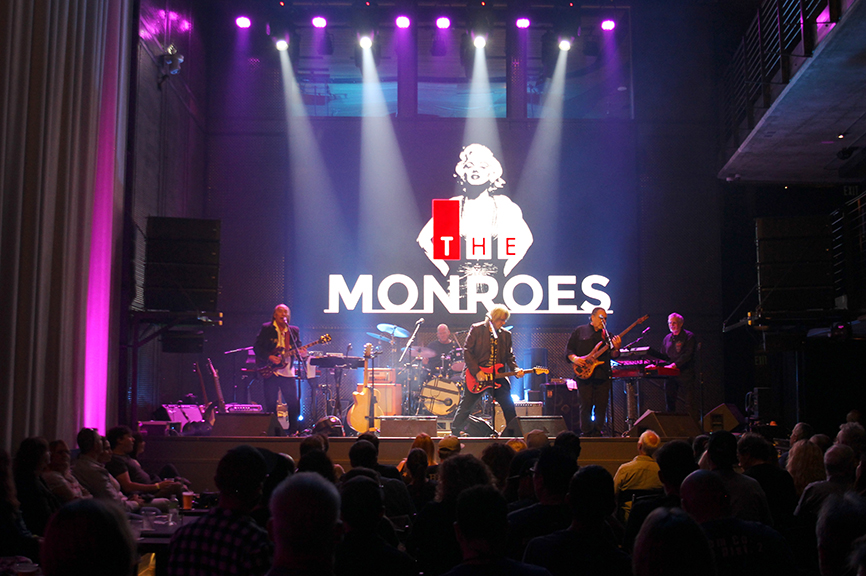

Background information
- Also known as: The Official Band from the 80’s!
- Origin: San Diego, California, U.S.
- Genres: New wave, power pop
- Years active: 1982–1988, 2019–present
- Label: Alfa
- Members: Bob "Monroe" Davis; Dave Hart; Ronny Jones; Barry Scott; Bobby Sale
- Past members: Eric Denton; Jesus "Tony" Ortiz; Rusty Jones; Jonnie Gilstrap

The Monroes are a pop/rock/country pop band from San Diego, California active throughout most of the 1980s, with a resurgence in the 2010s. They are best known for their single "What Do All the People Know." After a hiatus where the members branched out to different projects, (with members Bob Monroe and Dave Hart together performing Monroes songs and others throughout the ‘80s, ‘90s and up to around 2010) they reformed in 2016 and released all new music including “Ball & Chain”, “Midnight in Hollywood”, and “It’s a Good Thing God Will Forgive You.” Their 2019 album “2.0” was published on CD with many songs having corresponding videos (available on YouTube). They followed this album up with an EP, Open Your Ears, in 2021.

== Background ==
For keyboardist Eric Denton, forming the Monroes fulfilled his early fantasies of becoming a rock star. Born in Lansing, Michigan, Denton moved to Ventura, California with his family at a young age, at which point he began immersing himself in piano studies. By the late 1970s, Denton had already performed at several high school dances, when his family moved to San Diego. In addition to his musical talents, by this point, he had also become very savvy on the business and organizational aspects of the music world, an attribute that would serve him well during the Monroes years. Before long, he was playing in the band Peter Rabbitt. However, after touring with this band for a while, Denton returned to San Diego, where he bought a recording studio with the goal of creating a group that played all original material.

While working in the recording studio (Accusound), Denton had brushes with other budding musicians, one of whom was bassist Bob Davis (a.k.a. "Bob Monroe"), with whom he was especially impressed. Before long the two had joined, forming the nucleus of what would become The Monroes. Another musician who regularly visited the studio was guitarist Rusty Jones, who had previously played with Davis in the Ken Dixon Band (an all-covers band), and he became the next to join this fledgling group. Denton's former Peter Rabbitt bandmate, drummer Jonnie Gilstrap came on board, and the search was then on for a lead singer. The band ultimately decided on Jesus "Tony" Ortiz (a.k.a. "Tony Monroe"), who Denton described as having the ability to "make any song, good or bad, sound great", to fill this capacity.

According to Ortiz, the band's name, "The Monroes" was derived from a band Bob Davis was originally in with the now well-known singer-songwriter Rick Elias called "Rick Elias and the Monroes". In this context, the "Monroes" part of the name was a direct reference to the fact that Elias was originally from Monroe, Louisiana. Once Elias left for a solo career, he allowed Davis to keep the name.

The band began recording demos of early tracks at Accusound, and they began shopping them around the Los Angeles area. They soon recruited John Deverian as their manager, who signed them to a small Japanese label, Alfa Records. Before long, the band was recording what would become their debut EP at Chateau Studios. One of their recent songs was called "What Do All the People Know" which was written by Bob Monroe.

"What Do All the People Know" generated a local buzz around the San Diego area, and it was selected as the first single released from the group's self-titled EP, completed in 1982. They then toured with the likes of Toto, Greg Kihn, and Rick Springfield while their single climbed the charts to #59. However, as the band was pondering ideas for their first music video, they found out that their Japan-based record label Alfa was abandoning its US market. Without the backing of a label, they were left with no North American promotion, and the band's single and mini-album quickly fell off the charts. Individual band members gradually quit the group over the next several years. The remaining members would continue until the band eventually broke up in 1988.

=== Post-1980s ===
After the breakup, bassist Bob Davis joined the band Street Heart. Bob continued to produce, write and perform.

Denton owned Guitar Trader in San Diego, California, which closed, after being a long-time pillar of the San Diego music scene, in December 2014. Jones returned from a long musical hiatus in 2005, and began writing and performing again in the San Diego area. Gilstrap returned to San Diego in 2006 and studied tribal fusion and Middle Eastern drumming. In 2007, Denton had a son named Kyle.

Ortiz left the band in 1986 and, disillusioned with the music business, moved to Minneapolis shortly thereafter. He would remain there for the next twenty years. Then, in 2006, he returned to California, where he reconnected with Jones. By 2007, the two were performing live and did not rule out the possibility of a complete Monroes reunion. Ortiz later returned to Minnesota to be closer to his children and has continued performing on his own there.

Bob Monroe met keyboardist Dave Hart in the 1980s and they began performing together with other local musicians. Hart studied at the SDSU Electronic Music Studio while attending college, and was a classically trained pianist before studying synthesis and sampling. He later became a lawyer in San Diego but continued his friendship and performances with Bob Monroe.

=== 2013–present: New developments ===
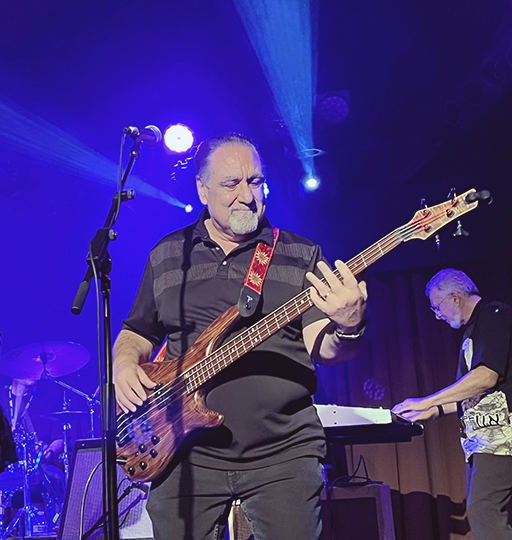
Bob Davis playing a Monroes concert in 2022

In 2013, the band released a seven-song EP, What Do All the People Know?, featuring an alternate version of "What Do All the People Know?" (including a portion of the final verse extracted from the version featured on the original 1982 EP) as well as previously unreleased material from their early recording sessions.

In 2016, Bob, Dave, and Ronny Jones (brother of original Monroes Guitarist Rusty Jones) joined with former States guitarist Barry Scott to reform The Monroes. Later, drummer Bob Sale joined with the band and they began writing and producing new music.

The Monroes first album of all new music was released in 2019 to positive reviews. The band began performing the new material. The song Ball & Chain became the band's opener at most concerts, with its tongue in cheek lyrics and rhythmic country pop sound. Hart recalls “mostly I play organ and piano on the album to keep to our rock roots sound, but we definitely keep the 80’s pop feel!”

On August 28, 2020, a long-awaited "official" music video for "What Do All the People Know?" was released, interpolating the original vision for the video 38 years prior with modern scenes and vintage footage from past Monroes shows.

In 2021, the band released an EP, Open Your Ears, with the hit song Rosemary's Daughter, penned by Barry Scott.

In 2022, former members Eric Denton, Rusty Jones and Tony Ortiz joined The Monroes on stage at the Belly-Up Tavern in Solana Beach, CA for a performance of some of the band's biggest hits, including Ortiz' rockin' vocals on "Somewhere in the Night."

In 2023 Scott and Hart both moved to Las Vegas, NV.

== Discography ==
=== Albums ===
- The Monroes (Alfa Records AAE-15015) – 1982 (U.S. version has five tracks)

(The Japanese version of the album (Alfa Records ULR-18001) features "Yamarock", the b-side of the "What Do All the People Know" single as a sixth track and a different cover from the U.S. edition.)

- What Do All the People Know? (MusicPower.com) – 2013
- 2.0 - 2019
- Open Your Ears (EP) - 2021

=== Singles ===
- U.S. 7" (Alfa Records ALF-7119)

A-What Do All The People Know (3:23)

B-Yamarock (3:24)

=== Compilations ===
- 1985 Will They Know It's Summertime (91x) U.S. - A San Diego Radio Station charity album - Contains the song "Stones Against The Rain"

Each of these albums include the song "What Do All the People Know"

- 1994 Living in Oblivion (The 80's Greatest Hits – Volume 3) (EMI E2-27674) U.S.
- 1994 Just Can't Get Enough: New Wave Hits of the '80s, Vol. 4 (Rhino R2 71697 ) U.S.
- 2001 Shake Some Action Vol. 4 (Shake Some Action SSA 4) Europe
