= Naughty Boys (album) =

1983 studio album by Yellow Magic Orchestra

Studio album by Yellow Magic Orchestra
- Released: May 24, 1983
- Recorded: October 1982 – March 1983
- Studios: Alfa Studio "A", Shibaura, Minato; Onkio Haus, Ginza, Chūō; Tokyo
- Genre: Synth-pop
- Length: 38:25
- Label: Alfa
- Producer: YMO

Yellow Magic Orchestra chronology
| Technodelic (1981) | Naughty Boys (1983) | Naughty Boys Instrumental (1983) |

Singles from Naughty Boys
- 1. "Kimi ni, mune kyun." Released: 1983

Professional ratings
Review scores
| Source | Rating |
|---|---|
| AllMusic | 4/5 stars |

Naughty Boys (浮気なぼくら, Uwaki na bokura; "Naughty boys") is the sixth studio album by Japanese electronic music band Yellow Magic Orchestra. Recorded from October 1982 to March 1983, and released on May 24, 1983, it contains the J-pop single "Kimi ni Mune Kyun", as well as a "preview" of "You've Got to Help Yourself", which was released in its full version on the companion album Naughty Boys Instrumental, and again with vocals on Service.

== Overview ==
Naughty Boys was their final album to top the Oricon charts. After that, no technopop artist was able to reach No.1 until Perfume's 2008 album Game. "Kimi ni Mune Kyun" also became the highest-charting single by a technopop artist on the Oricon charts, debuting at No. 2; a record the song retained until Perfume's "Love the World" debuted at No. 1 in 2008. "Ongaku" ("Music") was reportedly written by Ryuichi Sakamoto for his then-two-year-old daughter, Miu. Naughty Boys was re-released in 2004 in a double disc package alongside Naughty Boys Instrumental.

Various cover versions of "Kimi ni Mune Kyun" have been produced by later artists, including Jan Linton in 1992, and including School Food Punishment in 2011. Also in 2009, a cover of "Kimi ni Mune Kyun" was used as the ending theme song for the anime series Maria Holic, sung by Asami Sanada, Marina Inoue, and Yū Kobayashi, the voice actresses of the main characters.

== Reception ==
"Kimi ni Mune Kyun"
Sample of "Kimi ni Mune Kyun" (1983). It has been covered by artists such as The Human League and used in the anime series Maria Holic.

John Bush of AllMusic noted how the album sounds very different from their previous albums, praising it as "a solid album of commercial synth-pop" as well as the lead single "Kimi Ni Mune Kyun" for "featuring vocals just as accomplished as its production." Andrew Stout of SF Weekly has praised the album as "sensuous musique concrète perfected."

== Naughty Boys Instrumental ==
Naughty Boys Instrumental

Remix album by Yellow Magic Orchestra
- Released: July 27, 1983
- Recorded: October 1982-March 1983
- Genres: Electronic; dance; electronic rock; techno; J-pop; new wave; synth-pop
- Length: 42:12
- Label: Alfa Records
- Producer: YMO

Yellow Magic Orchestra chronology
| Naughty Boys (1983) | Naughty Boys Instrumental (1983) | Service (1983) |

A remix album, Naughty Boys Instrumental (浮気なぼくら（インストゥルメンタル）, Uwaki na bokura (Instrumental); "Naughty boys"), was released in July 1983 by record label Alfa. It contained nearly the entire Naughty Boys album as instrumental tracks in an entirely different running order, as well as the b-side to "Kimi ni, mune kyun.", "Chaos Panic"; and the full instrumental version of "You've Got to Help Yourself", which was released in "preview" form on the previous album. "You've Got to Help Yourself"'s vocal version is also featured on Service.

Naughty Boys Instrumental featured additional synthesizers imitating the vocal lines, as well as new embellishments and mixes. Several tracks featured sonically updated percussion tracks, while "Ongaku" featured an acoustic piano soloing over the piece.

The instrumental versions of "Chaos Panic", "Lotus Love", and "Kai-Koh" were later included as bonus tracks on Restless Records' 1992 CD release of X∞Multiplies in the United States and Canada, alongside the non-album single "Kageki Na Shukujo". Later, Naughty Boys Instrumental was re-released in its entirety as part of a double-CD package with the original Naughty Boys in 2004.

== Translation notes ==
As on some other YMO albums, song titles are provided in both Japanese and English, and some have different translations altogether:

- "君に、胸キュン。" translates to "My Heart Beats for You."
- Though "Expected Way" and "Expecting Rivers" are the official translations, the Japanese titles translate to "Desired Path" and "River of Hope", respectively.
- "邂逅" translates to "Chance Meeting".
- "以心電信" translates to "Telegraph of the Heart".

== Track listing ==
=== Naughty Boys ===
Side one
| No. | Title | Lyrics | Music | Length |
|---|---|---|---|---|
| 1. | "Kimi ni, mune kyun. (A holiday affair)" (君に、胸キュン。（浮気なヴァカンス）; "Kimi ni, mune kyun. (Uwaki na vacances)") | Takashi Matsumoto | Yellow Magic Orchestra | 4:07 |
| 2. | "Expected Way" (希望の路; "Kibou no michi") | Yukihiro Takahashi | Takahashi | 4:34 |
| 3. | "Focus" | Haruomi Hosono, Peter Barakan | Takahashi, Hosono | 3:41 |
| 4. | "Ongaku" (音楽; "Music") | Ryuichi Sakamoto | Sakamoto | 3:25 |
| 5. | "Opened My Eyes" | Takahashi, Barakan | Takahashi | 3:40 |

Side two
| No. | Title | Lyrics | Music | Length |
|---|---|---|---|---|
| 1. | "You've Got to Help Yourself (Preview)" (以心電信（予告編）; "Ishin denshin (Yokokuhen)") | | Takahashi, Sakamoto | 0:30 |
| 2. | "Lotus Love" | Hosono | Hosono | 4:05 |
| 3. | "Kai-Koh" (邂逅; "Kaikō") | Sakamoto | Sakamoto | 4:27 |
| 4. | "Expecting Rivers" (希望の河; "Kibou no kawa") | Takahashi | Takahashi, Sakamoto | 4:37 |
| 5. | "Wild Ambitions" | Hosono | Hosono, Sakamoto | 5:10 |

=== Naughty Boys Instrumental ===
Side one
| No. | Title | Writer(s) | Length |
|---|---|---|---|
| 1. | "Chaos Panic" | Haruomi Hosono | 4:12 |
| 2. | "Expected Way" (希望の路; "Kibou no michi") | Yukihiro Takahashi | 4:34 |
| 3. | "Focus" | Takahashi, Hosono | 3:41 |
| 4. | "Kai-Koh" (邂逅; "Kaikō") | Ryuichi Sakamoto | 4:27 |
| 5. | "Expecting Rivers" (希望の河; "Kibou no kawa") | Takahashi, Sakamoto | 4:37 |

Side two
| No. | Title | Writer(s) | Length |
|---|---|---|---|
| 1. | "You've Got to Help Yourself" (以心電信; "Ishin denshin") | Takahashi, Sakamoto | 4:21 |
| 2. | "Lotus Love" | Hosono | 4:05 |
| 3. | "Ongaku" (音楽; "Ongaku") | Sakamoto | 3:25 |
| 4. | "Opened My Eyes" | Takahashi | 3:40 |
| 5. | "Wild Ambitions" | Hosono, Sakamoto | 5:10 |

== Personnel ==
- Yellow Magic Orchestra – Arrangements, Electronics, Mixing engineers, Producers
- Haruomi Hosono – Bass, Synth Bass, Keyboards, Vocals
- Ryuichi Sakamoto – Keyboards, Vocals
- Yukihiro Takahashi – Vocals, Electronic drums, Cymbals, Keyboards

Guest musicians

- Takeshii Fujii & Akihiko Yamazoe – Technical assistance
- Takashi Matsumoto – Lyrics for "Kimi ni, mune kyun."
- Peter Barakan – Lyrics for "Focus" and "Opened My Eyes"
- Bill Nelson – Electric guitar

Staff

- Mitsuo Koike – Recording & Mixing engineer
- Akitsugu Doi (Studio "A”) & Takanobu Arai (Onkio Haus) – Assistant Engineers
- Kazusuke Obi & Osamu Takahashi – A&R Coordinators
- Yōichi Itō (Office Intenzio) & Hiroshi Ōkura (B-2 Unit) – Management
- Tsuguya Inoue (Beans) – Art director
- Tsukuitoshinao – Creative Services
- Masayoshi Sukita – Photography
- Mikio Honda (Bijin) – Hair, Makeup

== See also ==
- 1983 in Japanese music
