= X∞Multiplies =

×∞Multiplies

Studio album by Yellow Magic Orchestra
- Released: 5 June 1980 (10", Japan)
- Recorded: 1980
- Studios: Alfa Studio “A”, The Studio Doo Wap
- Genres: Electronic; comedy; dance; synth-funk; experimental; art rock; new wave; synth-pop
- Length: 29:20 (Japanese version); 30:16 (American version); 36:33 (European version)
- Label: Alfa
- Producer: Haruomi Hosono

Yellow Magic Orchestra chronology
Public Pressure (1980)	×∞Multiplies (1980)	BGM (1981)

Singles from ×∞Multiplies
- 1. "Nice Age" Released: 1980; 2. "Tighten Up" Released: 1980; 3. "Behind the Mask (US & UK only)" Released: August 1980

×∞Multiplies (増殖, Zōshoku; lit. "multiplication") is the third studio album by Japanese electronic music band Yellow Magic Orchestra. Released in 1980, it contains a mixture of songs and instrumentals by the group, interspersed with comedy sketches. These sketches are performed by Snakeman Show in both Japanese and English, with YMO participating in some of them.

== Reception ==
Professional ratings
Review scores
Source	Rating
AllMusic	2.5/5 stars
Smash Hits	5/10
Stereo Review	"Terrific"

The US version was well received by the Stereo Review, which described the recording as "terrific" and the performance as "Techno-pop fun." The magazine stated that the "time is right" for the band's "highly technological blend of dance rhythms, heavy metal, and pop melodies" while noting that "Rydeen" in particular "sprints by at a fast clip, ticking off a sprightly tune against a continuous bass-and-drum texture," though the "more rock-style efforts" were not as well received, with the magazine stating that "YMO's electronic tricks" and "the rock sensibility just don't seem to mix." AllMusic later reviewed the Japanese version, describing it as "bizarre" and scoring it 2.5 out of 5.

== Release history ==
×∞Multiplies was released in several formats worldwide. The original Japanese pressing came on 10" vinyl. The United States pressing compiled tracks from both this record and from Solid State Survivor, which had not been released there, while dropping the comedy sketches; the United Kingdom released ×∞Multiplies with additional tracks culled from Yellow Magic Orchestra. All re-issues from 2003 onward reverted to the original Japanese track list (the version with the American track list had been re-issued various times over the years until 1999, when both Japanese and American issues were remastered under Haruomi Hosono's supervision and each received a new set of liner notes—the Japanese by Fantastic Plastic Machine and the American by Derrick May).

The tracks differ slightly between the Japanese and US versions: In the original release Nice Age has an abrupt ending and other tracks crossfade between the Snakeman Show sketches; in the US version these have clean intros and endings and Jingle 'YMO' is listed as part of the Nice Age track.

Region	Date	Label	Format	Catalog
Japan	5 June 1980	Alfa Records	10" LP	YMO-1
United States	29 July 1980	A&M Records	LP	SP4813
Japan	5 September 1980	Alfa	LP (as above US version, with obi)	ALR-28004

== Track listing ==
=== Japanese version ===
Side one
No.	Title	Lyrics	Music	Length
1.	"Jingle “Y.M.O.”"		Yellow Magic Orchestra	0:21
2.	"Nice Age"	Chris Mosdell	Yukihiro Takahashi, Ryuichi Sakamoto	3:46
3.	"Snakeman Show: KDD (skit)"			1:56
4.	"Tighten Up (Japanese Gentlemen Stand Up Please!)"	Billy Buttier	Archie Bell	3:41
5.	"Snakeman Show: Mister Ōhira (skit)"			2:05
6.	"Here We Go Again ~ Tighten Up"	Buttier	Bell	1:07

Side two
No.	Title	Lyrics	Music	Length
1.	"Snakeman Show: Koko wa Keisatsu Janai yo (ここは警察じゃないよ) (skit)"			1:26
2.	"Citizens of Science"	Mosdell	Sakamoto	4:29
3.	"Snakeman Show: Manpei Hayashiya (林家万平) (skit)"			2:08
4.	"Multiplies"		Elmer Bernstein, YMO	2:58
5.	"Snakeman Show: Wakai Yamabiko (若い山彦) (skit)"			3:44
6.	"The End of Asia"		Sakamoto	1:32

=== American version ===
Some pressings included "Tighten Up" as the opening track for side one.

Side one
No.	Title	Lyrics	Music	Length
1.	"Nice Age"	Mosdell	Takahashi, Sakamoto	3:55
2.	"Behind the Mask"	Mosdell	Sakamoto	3:36
3.	"Rydeen"		Takahashi	4:26
4.	"Day Tripper"	Lennon–McCartney	Lennon–McCartney	2:40

Side two
No.	Title	Lyrics	Music	Length
1.	"Technopolis"		Sakamoto	4:14
2.	"Multiplies"		Elmer Bernstein	2:58
3.	"Citizens of Science"	Mosdell	Sakamoto	4:29
4.	"Solid State Survivor"	Mosdell	Takahashi	3:58

=== European version ===
On this pressing, the first "Snakeman Show" is actually "Jingle “Y.M.O.”", while the second "Snakeman Show" is the "Mister Ōhira" skit from the Japanese pressing. "Tighten Up" does not include the "Here We Go Again" section on vinyl, but this is featured on the cassette.

Side one
No.	Title	Lyrics	Music	Length
1.	"Technopolis"		Sakamoto	4:14
2.	"Absolute Ego Dance"		Haruomi Hosono	4:38
3.	"Behind the Mask"	Mosdell	Sakamoto	3:35
4.	"Computer Game 'Theme from The Circus'"		YMO	1:45
5.	"Firecracker"		Martin Denny	4:52
6.	"Computer Game 'Theme from The Invader'"		YMO	1:00

Side two
No.	Title	Lyrics	Music	Length
1.	"Snakeman Show"			0:20
2.	"Nice Age"	Mosdell	Takahashi, Sakamoto	3:46
3.	"Multiplies"		Bernstein, YMO	2:57
4.	"Snakeman Show"	Masatou Ibu, Paul McCartney		2:05
5.	"Citizens of Science"	Mosdell	Sakamoto	4:30
6.	"Tighten Up (Japanese Gentlemen Stand Up Please!)"	Buttier	Bell	2:52

== Personnel ==
- Yellow Magic Orchestra – arrangements, electronics, directors, mixing engineers
  - Haruomi Hosono – bass, synth Bass, keyboards, production
  - Ryuichi Sakamoto – keyboards
  - Yukihiro Takahashi – vocals, drums, electronic drums, percussion, mannequin costume design

Snakeman Show – counterparts

- Moichi Kuwahara – voice on "Jingle “Y.M.O.”", script supervisor
- Katsuya Kobayashi – voice on "Tighten Up" & "Here We Go Again"
- Masatō Ibu – voice on "Tighten Up" & "The End of Asia"

Guest musicians

- Hideki Matsutake – microcomposer programming
- Chris Mosdell – lyrics, voice on "Citizens of Science"
- Kenji Ōmura – electric guitar
- Sandii – vocals on "Nice Age"
- Mika Fukui – voice on "Nice Age"
- The Studio Doo Wap – script supervisors

Staff

- Shōrō Kawazoe – executive producer
- Mitsuo Koike – recording and mixing engineer
- Norio Yoshizawa, Atsushi Saito, Yasuhiko Terada & Michitaka Tanaka – recording engineers
- Takahisa Kamijyo – art director
- Kiichi Ichida (Cinq Art) – mannequin modeling
- Masayoshi Sukita – photography

US/Europe versions alternative staff

- Sakamoto – vocoded vocals, piano, electric piano, percussion, orchestration
- Makoto Ayukawa – electric guitar on "Day Tripper" and "Solid State Survivor"
- Sandii – vocals on "Absolute Ego Dance"
- Kunihiko Murai and Kawazoe – executive producers
- Yoshizawa – recording engineers, remix
- Saito & Koike – recording engineers
- Al Schmitt – mixing engineer
- Mike Reese – mastering engineer
- Shunsuke Miyasumi, Masako Hikasa & Akira Ikuta – recording coordinators
- Tommy LiPuma – supervisor

== Charts ==
Year	Release	Chart	Peak Position	Weeks	Total Sales
1980	10" LP	Japan Oricon LP Chart	1	24	331,000
1980	Cassette	Japan Oricon CT Chart	3	30	81,000
1980	12" LP	Japan Oricon LP Chart	7	34	18,600
1980	LP	U.S. Billboard 200	177		

×∞Multiplies was the eighth best selling album of 1980 in Japan – the best selling was Solid State Survivor as sales continued from the previous year.

== See also ==
- 1980 in Japanese music
