= Behind the Mask (song) =

1980 single by Yellow Magic Orchestra

- 1980 UK single cover

Single by Yellow Magic Orchestra

from the album Solid State Survivor and X∞Multiplies (international versions)
- Released: August 1980
- Studio: Alfa Studio "A", Shibaura, Minato, Tokyo
- Genre: Synth-pop
- Length: 3:35
- Label: Alfa
- Composer: Ryuichi Sakamoto
- Lyricist: Chris Mosdell
- Producer: Haruomi Hosono

Yellow Magic Orchestra singles chronology
"Rydeen" (1980)	"Behind the Mask" (1980)	"Nice Age" (1980)

"Behind the Mask" is a 1979 song by the Japanese synth-pop group Yellow Magic Orchestra. The composer, Ryuichi Sakamoto, wrote the first version for a television commercial. (Note: The first version of the song used for the Seiko television commercial in 1978 is included in track 18, disc 2 of UC YMO: Ultimate Collection of Yellow Magic Orchestra released in 2003.) A new version with lyrics by Chris Mosdell was released on the 1979 Yellow Magic Orchestra album Solid State Survivor. In the US and the UK, "Behind the Mask" was released as a single from the 1980 album X∞Multiplies.

In the early 1980s, the American pop singer Michael Jackson recorded a version with extra lyrics and melodies. It was omitted from his 1982 album Thriller as no royalty arrangement could be agreed. Jackson's demo was released on the album Thriller 40 in 2022.

In the 1980s, artists including Greg Phillinganes, Eric Clapton and the Human League recorded versions based on Jackson's demo. Clapton's version, released in 1987, was a top-20 single in some markets. An updated remix of Jackson's version was released on the 2010 album Michael.

== Yellow Magic Orchestra version (1979) ==
The Japanese composer Ryuichi Sakamoto wrote the first version of "Behind the Mask" for a 1978 television commercial for Seiko watches. His band, Yellow Magic Orchestra, recorded a new version for their 1979 album Solid State Survivor. This featured English lyrics written by the British poet and lyricist Chris Mosdell, which Sakamoto sang using a vocoder.

Mosdell based his lyrics on the imagery of a traditional Japanese Noh mask and a poem by the Irish poet W. B. Yeats, "The Mask". Mosdell said he was "talking about a very impersonal, socially controlled society, a future technological era, and the mask represented that immobile, unemotional state".

In 1980, "Behind the Mask" was released as a single in the United States and the United Kingdom, where it was included on the third Yellow Magic Orchestra album, X∞Multiplies.

=== Track listing ===
US promotional 7" single

1. "Behind the Mask" (mono) – 3:35
2. "Behind the Mask" (stereo) – 3:35

US promotional 12" single

1. "Behind the Mask" – 3:35
2. "Nice Age" – 3:55
3. "Technopolis" – 4:15

US 7" single

1. "Behind the Mask" – 3:35
2. "Citizens of Science" – 4:33

UK (yellow vinyl and promotional black vinyl) and Italy 7" single

1. "Behind the Mask" – 3:35
2. "Yellow Magic (Tong Poo)" – 6:20

UK 12" single

1. "Behind the Mask" – 3:35
2. "Yellow Magic (Tong Poo)" – 6:20
3. "La Femme Chinoise" – 6:05

Argentina 7" single

1. "Cerca de la Mascara (Behind the Mask)" – 3:35
2. "Vacacion de un Dia (Day Tripper)" – 2:39

== Michael Jackson demo (1982) ==
"Behind the Mask"

Song by Michael Jackson

from the album Thriller 40
- Released: November 18, 2022
- Recorded: 1982
- Studio: Westlake (Los Angeles, California)
- Genre: Synth-pop; dance-pop; R&B
- Length: 5:01
- Label: Epic
- Songwriters: Michael Jackson; Chris Mosdell; Ryuichi Sakamoto
- Producer: Michael Jackson

The American singer Michael Jackson recorded a demo of "Behind the Mask" for his sixth album, Thriller (1982). The song was introduced to him by his producer, Quincy Jones, who had heard it on a visit to Japan. Jackson added a melody and extra lyrics. Mosdell said: "He made it into a love song about a woman. It was a completely different premise to me ... But hey, I let him have that one."

"Behind the Mask" was not included on Thriller as Sakamoto, Mosdell, and Jackson could not reach an agreement on royalties. Jackson's demo was used to create versions by other artists. On November 18, 2022, it was released on the anniversary album Thriller 40 as "Mike's Mix (Demo)".

== Greg Phillinganes version (1984) ==
"Behind the Mask"

Single by Greg Phillinganes

from the album Pulse
- B-side: "Only You"
- Released: 1985
- Genre: Funk; soul; synth-pop
- Length: 4:07
- Label: Planet
- Songwriters: Chris Mosdell; Ryuichi Sakamoto; Michael Jackson
- Producer: Richard Perry

Jackson's keyboardist Greg Phillinganes recorded a version of "Behind the Mask" for his 1984 album Pulse. It was released as a single in 1985. In the US, it reached number four on the Billboard Dance Club Songs chart and number 77 on the Billboard Hot R&B/Hip-Hop Songs chart.

=== Track listing ===
7" single

1. "Behind the Mask" – 4:07
2. "Only You" – 6:16

12" single

1. "Behind the Mask" – 6:27
2. "Behind the Mask" (instrumental) – 5:13
3. "Only You" – 6:16

=== Personnel ===
- Greg Phillinganes – lead vocals, keyboards
- John Arrias – additional engineering
- Brian Banks – synthesizer programming
- Michael Boddicker – vocoder
- Michael Jackson – arrangement
- Anthony Marinelli – synthesizer programming
- Richard Page – additional backing vocals
- Howie Rice – clap effects
- John Vigran – additional engineering
- David Williams – guitars

=== Charts ===
Chart (1985)	Peak position
US Dance Club Songs (Billboard)	4
US Hot R&B/Hip-Hop Songs (Billboard)	77

== Eric Clapton version (1986) ==
"Behind the Mask"

Single by Eric Clapton

from the album August
- B-side: "Grand Illusion"
- Released: 5 January 1987
- Recorded: 1986
- Genre: Rock; pop rock; synth-pop
- Length: 4:47 (album version); 3:38 (single edit)
- Label: Warner Bros.
- Songwriters: Chris Mosdell; Ryuichi Sakamoto; Michael Jackson (uncredited)
- Producers: Phil Collins; Tom Dowd

Eric Clapton singles chronology
"It's in the Way That You Use It" (1986)	"Behind the Mask" (1987)	"Tearing Us Apart" (1987)

The English musician Eric Clapton recorded "Behind the Mask" for his 1986 album August. Phillinganes brought the composition to Clapton's attention, and played keyboards and performed background vocals. Jackson was not credited as a co-writer, but Mosdell confirmed that Jackson's estate took 50% of the songwriting royalties.

Clapton's version of "Behind the Mask" was released as a single in January 1987. It reached number 15 on the UK singles chart on February 21, 1987.

=== Track listing ===
UK 7" single (928461-7, W8461)

1. "Behind the Mask" (edit) – 3:38
2. "Grand Illusion" – 4:30

UK 12" single (W8461)

1. "Behind the Mask" (LP version) – 4:47
2. "Grand Illusion" – 4:30
3. "Wanna Make Love to You" – 5:36

UK 2×7" single (928461-7, W8461F)

1. "Behind the Mask" (edit)
2. "Grand Illusion"
3. "Crossroads" (live)
4. "White Room" (live)

=== Personnel ===
- Eric Clapton – guitar, vocals
- Phil Collins – drums, percussion, backing vocals, production
- Tom Dowd – associate production
- Nathan East – bass
- Paul Gomersall – engineering
- Peter Hefter – engineering
- Katie Kissoon – backing vocals
- Magic Moreno – engineering
- Tessa Niles – backing vocals
- Terry O'Neill – photography
- Greg Phillinganes – keyboards, backing vocals

=== Charts ===
==== Weekly charts ====
Chart (1987)	Peak position
Italy Airplay (Music & Media)	7
Luxembourg Radio Singles (Billboard)	12
UK Singles (OCC)	15

== Ryuichi Sakamoto version (1987) ==
Following the breakup of Yellow Magic Orchestra in 1983, Ryuichi Sakamoto re-recorded "Behind the Mask" in 1987 with Jackson's additional lyrics and lead vocals by Bernard Fowler. A similar arrangement had been performed (with Fowler) during Sakamoto's Media Bahn Live tour the previous year, and two nights of that tour were released on home media. A CD single with three tracks and a CD maxi single with six tracks entitled "Behind the Mask +3" were released.

=== Track listing ===
Japan CD single

1. "Behind the Mask" – 5:29
2. "Risky" – 6:22
3. "Field Work" – 5:07

Japan CD maxi single ("Behind the Mask +3")

1. "Behind the Mask" – 5:29
2. "Risky" – 6:22
3. "Field Work" – 5:07
4. "Steppin' into Asia" (TV track) – 3:39
5. "Field Work" (edit) – 2:34
6. 両眼微笑 (instrumental) – 3:57

== Michael Jackson remix (2010) ==
"Behind the Mask"

Single by Michael Jackson

from the album Michael
- B-side: "Hollywood Tonight" (vinyl)
- Released: February 21, 2011
- Recorded: 1982 (original); 2010 (rework)
- Studio: Westlake (Los Angeles, California)
- Genre: Synth-pop; dance-pop; R&B
- Length: 5:02 (album version); 3:39 (radio edit)
- Label: Epic
- Songwriters: Michael Jackson; Chris Mosdell; Ryuichi Sakamoto
- Producers: Michael Jackson; John McClain

Michael Jackson singles chronology
"Hollywood Tonight" (2011)	"Behind the Mask" (2011)	"All in Your Name" (2011)

Music videos
- "The Behind the Mask Project" on YouTube
- "Behind the Mask" on YouTube

Jackson's 1982 demo of "Behind the Mask" was used to create a remix by John McClain, released on the 2010 album Michael. McClain's additions include a saxophone solo, background vocals by Shanice, and crowd noise from the 1992 TV special Live in Bucharest: The Dangerous Tour.

On February 21, 2011, the remix was released by Epic Records as the third single from Michael. It was released as a single to radio and as a limited 7" for Record Store Day, and a music video edited together from fan contributions was released under the title "The Behind the Mask Project".

=== Critical reception ===
Reviewing Michael, Jody Rosen from Rolling Stone called the remixed version of "Behind the Mask" "a fiercely funky cousin to 'Wanna Be Startin' Somethin''." Dan Martin from NME wrote that it was "an absolute revelation, a swirl of psychedelic, orchestra-twinged R&B. Jackson howls a solid-gold melody at his fearsome best, and blippy production and robotic backing vocals dancing behind it." Writers from Billboard thought the song was among the album's "must-listen songs". The journalist Joe Vogel found the remix skillful, making it sound brand new and retro at the same time, and that it was one of the album's highlights. Leah Greenblatt from Entertainment Weekly felt the saxophone was dated.

=== Track listing ===
Download
No.	Title	Length
1.	"Behind the Mask" (album version)	5:01
Total length:		5:01

"Behind the Mask"/"Hollywood Tonight" 7" vinyl single
No.	Title	Length
1.	"Behind the Mask" (radio edit)	3:39
2.	"Hollywood Tonight" (Throwback mix)	3:46
Total length:		7:25

Poland promotional CD single
No.	Title	Length
1.	"Behind the Mask" (radio edit)	3:39
Total length:		3:39

=== Personnel ===
- Michael Jackson – solo vocal, beat box, background vocals, production
- Alex Al – bass
- Paulinho da Costa – percussion
- Khaliq Glover – mixing, engineering
- Alfonzo Jones – background vocals
- John McClain – production
- Jon Nettlesbey – additional keyboards, drum programming, sequencing, digital editing, mixing, engineering
- Greg Phillinganes – drums, additional keyboards
- Mike Phillips – saxophone, saxophonic percussion
- Shanice – background vocals
- Allen Sides – engineering
- Leon F. Sylvers III – background vocal arrangement, engineering
- David Williams – guitar
- Big Jim Wright – drums, keyboards, drum programming

=== Charts ===
Chart (2010–2011)	Peak position
Belgium (Ultratip Bubbling Under Wallonia)	24
Japan (Japan Hot 100)	71
UK Singles (OCC)	191

=== Release history ===
Country	Date	Format
France	February 21, 2011	CD single (promo); radio airplay
France	April 11, 2011	Vinyl single
Italy	April 12, 2011	Vinyl single
Poland	July 4, 2011	Radio airplay

== See also ==
- 1979 in Japanese music
