= Service (album) =

Studio album by Yellow Magic Orchestra
- Released: December 14, 1983
- Recorded: September – October 1983
- Studios: Alfa Studio “A”, Shibaura, Minato, Tokyo
- Genres: Electronic; experimental; J-pop; new wave; synth-pop; spoken word; musique concrète
- Length: 50:44; 30:18 (original EU pressing)
- Label: Alfa
- Producer: YMO

Yellow Magic Orchestra chronology
Naughty Boys Instrumental (1983)	Service (1983)	After Service (1984)

Singles from Service
- 1. "You've Got to Help Yourself" Released: September 28, 1983; 2. "Every Time I Look Around (I Hear the Madmen Call)" Released: 1984 (EU only)

Professional ratings
Review scores
Source	Rating
AllMusic	2.5/5 stars

Service is the seventh studio album by Japanese electronic music band Yellow Magic Orchestra, released on December 14, 1983.

== Background ==
The band dissolved the following year after a world tour, but would later reform in 1993 for a one-off reunion album, Technodon.

== Releases ==
Like ×∞Multiplies, it contains a mixture of YMO songs and comedy sketches performed by Super Eccentric Theater, or S.E.T. The first Dutch/German edition of the album shortened the sketches to ten-second interludes, effectively cutting the album's length in half. In 1999, the album was remastered under Hosono's supervision with new liner notes provided by lyricist Peter Barakan.

== Songs ==
Service features "You've Got to Help Yourself", which was previously featured in instrumental form on the previous album, Naughty Boys Instrumental. The 2nd "S.E.T." track featured Casiopea's song "Time Limit" from their album Mint Jams. "以心電信" more accurately transliterates to "Telegraph from the heart".

== Track listing ==
Side one
No.	Title	Lyrics	Music	Length
1.	"Limbo"	Yukihiro Takahashi, Haruomi Hosono, Peter Barakan	Takahashi, Hosono	3:21
2.	"S.E.T."			4:21
3.	"The Madmen"	Hosono, Barakan	Hosono	4:40
4.	"S.E.T."			1:23
5.	"Chinese Whispers"	Takahashi, Barakan	Takahashi	4:27
6.	"S.E.T."			4:16
7.	"You've Got to Help Yourself" (以心電信 Ishin Denshin)	Hosono, Barakan	Ryuichi Sakamoto, Takahashi	4:45

Side two
No.	Title	Lyrics	Music	Length
1.	"S.E.T.+YMO"			5:53
2.	"Shadows on the Ground"	Sakamoto, Takahashi, Barakan	Sakamoto, Takahashi	4:20
3.	"S.E.T."			3:25
4.	"See-Through"	Barakan	YMO	3:36
5.	"S.E.T."			4:09
6.	"Perspective"	Sakamoto, Barakan	Sakamoto	5:12
7.	"S.E.T."			0:46

== Personnel ==
Yellow Magic Orchestra – arrangements, electronics, mixing engineers, producers

- Haruomi Hosono – bass guitar, synth bass, keyboards, vocals
- Ryuichi Sakamoto – keyboards, vocals
- Yukihiro Takahashi – vocals, electronic drums, cymbals, keyboards

Guest musicians

- Takeshii Fujii and Akihiko Yamazoe – technical assistance
- Peter Barakan – lyrics

Super Eccentric Theater

- Yūji Miyake, Hisahiro Ogura, Osamu Hagihashi, Daisuke Yamazaki, Kōichi Nagata, Etsuyo Mitani, Keiko Ishii & Akemi Imamura – counterparts

Staff

- Mitsuo Koike – recording and mixing engineer
- Akitsugu Doi – assistant engineer
- Teppei Kasai (CBS/Sony Shinanomachi Studio) – mastering engineer
- Tsuguya Inoue – art director, painting
- Beans – design

== See also ==
- 1983 in Japanese music
