= Yellow Magic Orchestra (album) =

1978 album by Yellow Magic Orchestra

Studio album by Yellow Magic Orchestra
- Released: November 25, 1978
- Recorded: July 10 – September 5, 1978
- Studios: Alfa Studio A, Shibaura, Minato, Tokyo
- Genres: Synth-pop; funk; lounge; exotica; electro-disco
- Length: 37:35
- Label: Alfa
- Producer: Haruomi Hosono

Yellow Magic Orchestra chronology
Yellow Magic Orchestra (1978)	Solid State Survivor (1979)

Singles from Yellow Magic Orchestra
- 1. "Tong Poo" / "Firecracker" Released: 1978 (promo only); 2. "Computer Game" / "Fire Cracker" Released: 1978, 1979; 3. "Cosmic Surfin'" Released: 1979; 4. "La femme chinoise" Released: 1979; 5. "Tong Poo" Released: 1979

Yellow Magic Orchestra is the debut studio album by Japanese electronic music band Yellow Magic Orchestra. Originally released by Alfa Records, in Japan in 1978, the album was released by A&M Records in Europe and the United States and Canada in early 1979, with the US version featuring new cover art but without the closing track of "Acrobat". Both versions would later be re-issued in 2003 as a double-disc format, with the American version as the first disc.

The album was an early example of synth-pop, a genre that the band helped pioneer. It contributed to the development of electro, hip hop, techno, and bleep techno. The album's innovations in electronic music included its use of the microprocessor-based Roland MC-8 Microcomposer music sequencer, which allowed the creation of new electronic sounds, and its sampling of video game sounds.

The album sold 250,000 copies in Japan and entered the Billboard 200 and R&B Albums charts in the United States. Its most successful single was "Computer Game / Firecracker", which sold over 400,000 records in the United States and was a top 20 hit in the United Kingdom.

== Production ==
The album was intended to be a one-off project for producer and bass player Haruomi Hosono and the two session musicians he had hired: drummer Yukihiro Takahashi and keyboard player Ryuichi Sakamoto. The trio were to create their own cover version of Martin Denny's 1959 exotica melody "Firecracker" with modern electronics, as a subversion of the exoticisation and Orientalism of the original tune, along with various original compositions also exploring themes of Asianness, exoticisation and Orientalism from a Japanese perspective. The album would eventually be called Yellow Magic Orchestra, as a satire of Japan's obsession with black magic at the time. The project proved highly popular, culminating in a career for the three musicians; one that would last until 1983, followed by successful solo careers and reunions over the decades to come.

They began recording the album in July 1978 at a Shibaura studio in Tokyo. It utilized a wide variety of electronic music equipment (as well as electric), including the Roland MC-8 Microcomposer, the Korg PS-3100 polyphonic synthesizer, the Korg VC-10 vocoder, the Yamaha Drums and Syn-Drums electronic drum kits, the Moog III-C and Minimoog monosynths, the Polymoog and ARP Odyssey analog synthesizers, the Oberheim Eight Voice synthesizer, the Fender Rhodes electric piano, and the Fender Jazz Bass. Besides the electronic equipment, the only acoustic instruments used in the album were a Steinway piano, drum set, and a marimba.

It was the earliest known popular music album to use the Roland MC-8 Microcomposer, which was programmed by Hideki Matsutake during recording sessions. The swingy funk element present throughout the album was expressed by Matsutake programming through subtle variations of the MC-8's input. At the time, Billboard noted that the use of such computer-based technology in conjunction with synthesizers allowed Yellow Magic Orchestra to create new sounds that were not possible until then. The band later described both the MC-8 and Matsutake as an "inevitable factor" in both their music production and live performances.

The album was an early example of synth-pop, a genre that Yellow Magic Orchestra helped pioneer. Yellow Magic Orchestra experiments with different styles of electronic music, such as Asian melodies played over an "electro-disco" foundation in "Firecracker" and "Tong Poo", and the extensive use of video game sounds in "Computer Game". Both "Computer Game" tracks proper contain the same audio and were made to sound as if both games were being played in the same room; each track being from the perspective of its titular arcade game unit: Circus and Space Invaders. Both Circus and Space Invaders, along with several other popular arcade video games, were also featured in the promotional film for "Tong Poo".

== Release history ==
The album was first released in Japan in 1978. It was released in the US on 30 May 1979 by A&M Records on the Horizon label with a new mix by Al Schmitt, new cover art and a slightly different track listing. This "US version" was subsequently released in Japan on 25 July 1979 by Alfa. Promotional A&M copies were pressed on yellow vinyl.

"Firecracker" was released as a single under the name "Computer Game". As such, on early US pressings of the album, "Computer Game 'Theme from The Circus'" and "Firecracker" were combined as one track, while the firecracker sound effect at the end of the track was indexed by itself as "Firecracker". This was corrected on later pressings. The 1979 version also featured new mixing, highlighting a punchier equalization and heavy use of gated reverb. Several of the segues on the second side of the album were edited differently, while "Bridge over Troubled Music" was given an additional electric piano solo over top of the introductory percussion.

Region	Date	Label	Format	Catalog
Japan	25 November 1978	Alfa	12" LP; cassette	LP: ALR-6012; cassette: ALC-1511
Europe	1979	A&M	LP	AMLH 68506, PSP 736
North America	30 May 1979	A&M, Horizon Records & Tapes	12" LP, cassette	SP-736, CS-736
Japan	25 July 1979	Alfa	12" LP; cassette (US version)	LP: ALR-6020; cassette: ALC-1533
United Kingdom	2004	Epic	CD	513445 2

== Critical reception ==
Professional ratings
Review scores
Source	Rating
AllMusic	4/5 stars
Analog Planet	8/10
The Guardian	3/5 stars
Mojo	4/5 stars
Smash Hits	3/10
Uncut	4/5 stars

From contemporary reviews, Rosalind Russell of Record Mirror compared the group to Giorgio Moroder and Kraftwerk stating that the group "might resign themselves to coming a poor second", finding that the group's ethnicity and accents "may put off this nation's xenophobes. But who needs the UK? In the disco world we're small stakes anyway: the sons of Nihon are probably casting their eyes to the States and Germany."

== Track listing ==
=== Original pressing ===
Side one
No.	Title	Lyrics	Music	Length
1.	"Computer Game 'Theme from The Circus' (コンピューター・ゲーム —サーカスのテーマ—)"		group	1:48
2.	"Firecracker (ファイアークラッカー)"		Martin Denny	4:50
3.	"Simoon (シムーン)"	Chris Mosdell	Haruomi Hosono	6:27
4.	"Cosmic Surfin' (コズミック・サーフィン)"		Hosono	4:51
5.	"Computer Game 'Theme from The Invader' (コンピューター・ゲーム —インベーダーのテーマ—)"		group	0:43

Side two
No.	Title	Lyrics	Music	Length
1.	"Tong Poo (東風, tonpū; "east wind")"		Ryuichi Sakamoto	6:15
2.	"La femme chinoise (中国女, Chūgoku-onna)"	Mosdell	Yukihiro Takahashi	5:52
3.	"Bridge over Troubled Music (ブリッジ・オーバー・トラブルド・ミュージック)"		group	1:17
4.	"Mad Pierrot (マッド・ピエロ)"	uncredited	Hosono	4:20
5.	"Acrobat (アクロバット)"		Hosono	1:12

=== US pressing ===
Side one
No.	Title	Lyrics	Music	Length
1.	"Computer Game 'Theme from The Circus'"		group	1:48
2.	"Firecracker"		Martin Denny	4:50
3.	"Simoon"	Chris Mosdell	Haruomi Hosono	6:27
4.	"Cosmic Surfin'"		Hosono	4:28
5.	"Computer Game 'Theme from The Invader'"		group	1:01

Side two
No.	Title	Lyrics	Music	Length
1.	"Yellow Magic (Tong Poo)"		Ryuichi Sakamoto	6:17
2.	"La femme chinoise"	Mosdell	Yukihiro Takahashi	5:55
3.	"Bridge over Troubled Music"		group	1:18
4.	"Mad Pierrot"	uncredited	Hosono	4:05

== Personnel ==
Yellow Magic Orchestra – arrangements, electronics

- Haruomi Hosono – bass guitar, synth bass, synthesizers, production, mixing engineer (credited as "Harry Hosono" for latter two)
- Ryuichi Sakamoto – synthesizers, piano, electric piano, percussion, orchestration
- Yukihiro Takahashi – vocals, drums, electronic drums, marimba, percussion

Guest musicians

- Hideki Matsutake – Microcomposer programming
- Chris Mosdell – lyrics
- Shun'ichi "Tyrone" Hashimoto – vocoded vocals on "Simoon"
- Masayoshi Takanaka – electric guitar on "Cosmic Surfin'" and "La femme chinoise"
- Tomoko Nunoi (uncredited on earliest issues) – French narration (credited as "Sexy Voice") on "La femme chinoise"

Staff

- Kunihiko Murai – executive producer
- Norio Yoshizawa & Atsushi Saito – recording engineers
- Shunsuke Miyasumi – recording coordinator
- Masako Hikasa & Akira Ikuta – management
- Aijiro Wakita – design, art director
- Kazuo Hakamada – illustrations

US version alternative staff

- Minako Yoshida – vocals on "Yellow Magic (Tong Poo)"
- Tommy LiPuma – supervisor
- Al Schmitt – mixing engineer
- Mike Reese – mastering engineer
- Roland Young – art director
- Amy Nagasawa & Chuck Beeson – design
- Lou Beach – front cover art
- Masayoshi Sukita – back cover art

== Charts ==
Year	Release	Chart	Peak position	Weeks	Sales
1978	LP	Japan Oricon LP Chart	20	73	187,000
1978	Cassette	Japan Oricon CT Chart	17	35	63,000
2022	Album	Japan Oricon Albums Chart	68	6	14,000
		Japan			264,000
1980	LP	US Billboard 200	81	21	—
1980	LP	US R&B Albums	37	22	—

== "Computer Game / Firecracker" ==
The song "Firecracker" was released as a single in Japan in 1978 and in the United States and United Kingdom in 1979, becoming a major R&B hit in the United States. The same year, the song was released as the "Computer Game" single, which combined the "Computer Game" and "Firecracker" tracks together. The "Computer Game" single was an even greater international success, selling over 400,000 copies in the United States and entering the top 20 of the UK Singles Chart.

=== Charts ===
Chart (1980)	Peak position	Weeks	Sales
UK Singles Chart	17	11	—
US Billboard Hot 100	60	9	400,000
US Dance Club Singles	42	13	400,000
US R&B Singles	18	18	400,000

=== In popular culture ===
The song was popular with the emerging hip hop community, which appreciated the new electronic sounds, and in the Bronx, where it was later sampled by pioneering hip hop artist Afrika Bambaataa in his famous 1983 debut album Death Mix (1983). The "terse video-game funk" sounds of "Computer Game" influenced the emerging electro and hip hop music genres; the song's use of video game sounds and bleeps has been described as "ahead of their time" and as having a strong influence on 1980s hip hop and pop music. It was later included in electro hip hop artist Kurtis Mantronik's compilation album That's My Beat (2002), which consists of electro music that influenced his early career.

The song was also an influence on early techno, specifically Detroit techno, for which it was included in Carl Craig's compilation album Kings of Techno (2006). The song also influenced Sheffield's bleep techno music; Warp's third record, "Testone" (1990) by Sweet Exorcist, defined Sheffield's techno sound, by making playful use of sampled sounds from "Computer Game" along with dialogues from the film Close Encounters of the Third Kind (1977).

De La Soul's "Funky Towel" (for the 1996 film Joe's Apartment), Jennifer Lopez's hit "I'm Real" (2001), and the original version of Mariah Carey's "Loverboy" (for the 2001 film soundtrack Glitter), which was released as part of the 2020 compilation album The Rarities on October 2, 2020, also sampled the song.

== See also ==
- 1978 in Japanese music
