= Solid State Survivor =

Studio album by Yellow Magic Orchestra
- Released: September 25, 1979
- Recorded: March 2 – June 1979
- Studio: Alfa Studio "A", Shibaura, Minato, Tokyo
- Genre: Electronic; synth-pop
- Length: 32:23
- Label: Alfa
- Producer: Haruomi Hosono

Yellow Magic Orchestra chronology
Yellow Magic Orchestra (1978)	Solid State Survivor (1979)	Public Pressure (1980)

Singles from Solid State Survivor
- 1. "Technopolis" / "Solid State Survivor" Released: October 1979; 2. "Rydeen" Released: June 1980

Solid State Survivor is the second album by Japanese electronic music band Yellow Magic Orchestra, released in 1979. Later, Solid State Survivor was released in 1982 in the UK on LP and cassette, also in 1992 in the United States on CD, but many of the songs from this album were compiled for release in the US as the US pressing of ×∞Multiplies (1980), including the tracks "Behind the Mask", "Rydeen", "Day Tripper", and "Technopolis". Solid State Survivor is only one of a handful of YMO albums in which the track titles do not have a Japanese equivalent.

The album was an early example of synth-pop, a genre that the band helped pioneer alongside their earlier album Yellow Magic Orchestra (1978), and it also contributed to the development of techno. Solid State Survivor won the Best Album Award at the 22nd Japan Record Awards, and it sold two million records. In 2020, Jonathan McNamara of The Japan Times listed it as one of the 10 Japanese albums worthy of inclusion on Rolling Stone's 2020 list of the 500 greatest albums of all time. Additionally, the album has been referred to as "one of the godfathers of techno music," according to Matt Mitchell of Paste Magazine.

== Background ==
Professional ratings
Review scores
Source	Rating
AllMusic	4.5/5 stars
The Guardian	4/5 stars
Record Mirror	4/5 stars
Smash Hits	7/10

The album is also known for "Behind the Mask", which YMO had first produced in 1978 for a Seiko quartz wristwatch commercial. YMO made use of synthesizers for the melodies and digital gated reverb for the snare drums. The song has had numerous cover versions produced by other artists, most notably Michael Jackson. Alongside Quincy Jones, Jackson produced a slightly more dance-funk version of the techno classic with additional lyrics, originally intended for his best-selling album Thriller (1982). Despite the approval of songwriter Sakamoto and lyricist Chris Mosdell, it was eventually removed from the Thriller album due to legal issues with Yellow Magic Orchestra's management. Nevertheless, various cover versions were later performed by Greg Phillinganes, Eric Clapton (with Phillinganes as part of his backing band), Orbital, and The Human League, among others, before Jackson's cover version eventually appeared on his posthumous Michael album in 2010.

== Music ==
According to Matt Mitchell of Paste Magazine, "tapping into the album is like taking a time machine to a mecca of arenas built with dashing, gauzy, glamorous walls of relentlessly crystalline noise."

"Technopolis" is considered an "interesting contribution" to the development of techno, specifically Detroit techno, as it used the term "techno" in its title, was a tribute to Tokyo as an electronic mecca, and foreshadowed concepts that Juan Atkins and Rick Davis would later have with Cybotron. A chiptune arrangement of the album's third track, "Rydeen", would later appear as the main theme of the 1982 Sega arcade game Super Locomotive.

The album's title song "Solid State Survivor" is a new wave synth rock song. The popular anime series Dragon Ball Z later paid homage to the song and the album with the song "Solid State Scouter" as the theme song of the 1990 television special Dragon Ball Z: Bardock – The Father of Goku. The album also features a cover of the Beatles song "Day Tripper."

This was YMO's most successful album in Japan. It was the best selling album on the Oricon LP chart for 1980, beating Chiharu Matsuyama's Kishōtenketsu (起承転結) – Godiego's Magic Monkey (西遊記, Saiyūki) was the best seller in 1979. In 1980 the album won a Best Album Award (ベスト・アルバム賞, Besuto Arubamu Shō) in the 22nd Japan Record Awards. The album went on to sell two million records worldwide.

== Track listing ==
Side one
No.	Title	Music	Length
1.	"Technopolis"	Ryuichi Sakamoto	4:14
2.	"Absolute Ego Dance"	Haruomi Hosono	4:37
3.	"Rydeen"	Yukihiro Takahashi	4:26
4.	"Castalia"	Sakamoto	3:31

Side two
No.	Title	Lyrics	Music	Length
1.	"Behind the Mask"	Chris Mosdell	Sakamoto	3:36
2.	"Day Tripper"	Lennon–McCartney	Lennon–McCartney	2:40
3.	"Insomnia"	Mosdell	Hosono	4:57
4.	"Solid State Survivor"	Mosdell	Takahashi	3:58

== Personnel ==
- Yellow Magic Orchestra – arrangements, electronics, remix, cover conception
- Haruomi Hosono – bass guitar, synth bass, keyboards, vocoder, production
- Ryuichi Sakamoto – keyboards, vocoder
- Yukihiro Takahashi – vocals, drums, electronic drums, costume design

Guest musicians

- Hideki Matsutake – Microcomposer programming
- Chris Mosdell – lyrics
- Sandii – vocals on "Absolute Ego Dance"
- Makoto Ayukawa – electric guitar on "Day Tripper" and "Solid State Survivor"

Staff

- Kunihiko Murai and Shōrō Kawazoe – executive producers
- Norio Yoshizawa – recording engineer, remixing
- Mitsuo Koike – recording engineer
- Masako Hikasa and Akira Ikuta – recording coordinators
- Lou Beach – logo type
- Masayoshi Sukita – photography
- Heikichi Harata – art director
- Bricks – costumes
- Takehime, Fumiko Iura and Mayo Tsutsumi – stylists
- Mikio Honda (Clip) – hair

== Chart history ==
Year	Release	Chart	Peak position	Weeks	Total sales
1979	LP	Oricon LP Chart	1	82	766,000
1979	Cassette	Oricon CT Chart	1	65	255,000

== See also ==
- 1979 in Japanese music

Preceded by Eikō e no Dasshutsu: Alice Budokan Live (Alice); Ten Numbers Karatto (Southern All Stars); Yume Kuyō (Masashi Sada)	Japan Record Award for the Best Album; 1980	Succeeded by We Are (Off Course); Mizu no Naka no Asia e (Yumi Matsutoya); A Long Vacation (Eiichi Ohtaki)
