= Hideki Matsutake =

Japanese composer, arranger, and computer programmer (born 1951)

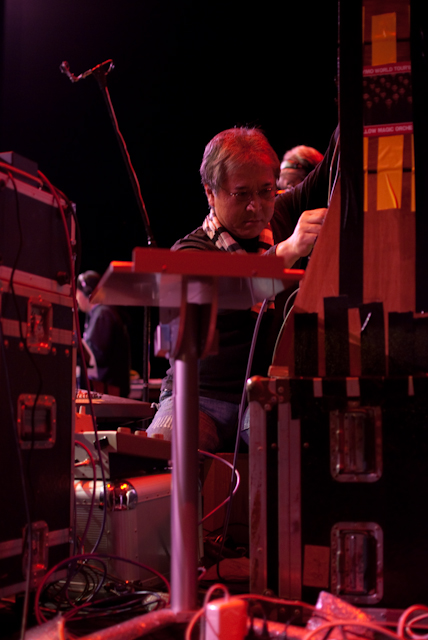

Background information
- Genre: Electronic music
- Occupations: Composer; arranger; programmer
- Instruments: Synthesizers; vocoder; sampler

Hideki Matsutake (born August 12, 1951 in Yokohama, Kanagawa Prefecture, Japan) is a Japanese composer, arranger, and computer programmer. He is known for his pioneering work in electronic music and particularly music programming, as the assistant of Isao Tomita during the early 1970s and as the "fourth member" of the band Yellow Magic Orchestra during the late 1970s to early 1980s.

Through his participation in the session recording of Ryuichi Sakamoto's 1978 album Thousand Knives, he joined the recordings of Yellow Magic Orchestra during 1978–1982 as their sound programmer, to become known as "the fourth member" of the group. In 1981, he formed a unit of his own under the name Logic System, which released its latest album in 2020. He also continued to take part in solo activities by YMO members such as Haruomi Hosono and Yukihiro Takahashi beyond the group's breakup in 1983. He was also a member of the video game music group Akihabara Electric Circus in 1988 and composed music for the 1996 video game Guardian Heroes. Matsutake was also a member of the musical group MONOLITH, which was responsible for creating the music for various Dragon Ball video games and insert songs from 1990 through the mid 2000s. Today, Matsutake is also Chairman of Japan Synthesizer Programmers Association (JSPA).

== Biography ==
Matsutake was grabbed by the playback of Wendy Carlos's Switched-On Bach using a synthesizer and a computer at the American Pavilion of Expo '70 in Osaka. In June the following year at age 19, he made his first step into professional music as an apprentice to Isao Tomita, providing him the chance of operating one of the few Moog III-P synthesizer units in Japan.

Establishing a company of his own named Musical Advertising Corporation (MAC) in 1974, his involvement with 'new music' artists such as Yoshitaka Minami and Akiko Yano started. In 1978 he participated in the production of Ryuichi Sakamoto's first album, Thousand Knives. In the years 1978 to 1982, Matsutake served Yellow Magic Orchestra as its sound programmer, eventually to become known as the "fourth member" of the band. He also led sequencing work for numerous technopop albums by other artists, especially at the beginning of the 80s.

In 1981, Matsutake formed "Logic System" with Makoto Irie, with whom he toured to perform in other Asian countries several times. The unit has released 10 albums to date, two out of them released in eight countries. Its latest album is Technasma, released in 2020. He was a member of Akihabara Electric Circus, which released the chiptune album Super Mario Bros. 3: Akihabara Electric Circus in 1988. He composed the video game music for Treasure's Guardian Heroes in 1996, alongside Nazo Suzuki. Matsutake is currently chairman of Japan Synthesizer Programmers Association (JSPA).

Matsutake's 2003 albums History of Logic System and To Gen Kyo ±1 contain what are currently believed to be the first commercial songs to use VOCALOID in their production; the songs "That Wonderful Love Once More" (あの素晴らしい愛をもう一度) and "Let's Take A Coffee (Coffee Rumba)" (Let's Take A Coffee (コーヒー・ルンバ)) are sung by pre-release versions of the voicebanks KAITO, MEIKO and Sweet Ann.

== Discography ==
=== Discography ===
Album title	Published	Song list
Space Fantasy (12″-LP)	25 April 1978	1. Overture-Space Cruiser Yamato 3:33; 2. Nocturnal Pursuit 3:33; 3. Iskandall 5:23; 4. White Morning After 3:14; 5. Scarlet Scarf 2:50; 6. Space Cruiser Yamato 4:09; 7. The Squadron 3:50; 8. Angel Dust 3:44; 9. Theme From "Close Encounters Of The Third Kind" 4:20; 10. Hope For Tomorrow-Dream 4:57
Logic (12″-LP)	5 June 1981	1. Intro 0:40; 2. Unit 4:50; 3. Domino Dance 4:15; 4. Convulsion of Nature 3:01; 5. XY? 4:16; 6. Talk Back 4:14; 7. Clash (Chinjyu of Sun) 4:17; 8. Person To Person 4:18; 9. Logic 4:15
Venus (12″-LP)	21 December 1981	1. Venus 4:59; 2. Morpheus 3:05; 3. I Love You 4:42; 4. Plan 3:00; 5. Take a Chance 4:29; 6. Automatic Collect, Automatic Correct 5:23; 7. Be Yourself 5:02; 8. Prophet 5:03; 9. Metamorphism 4:06; 10. Equivalent 0:33
Orient Express (12″-LP)	1 October 1982	1. Overture 0:48; 2. Orient Express 4:13; 3. Simoon 4:14; 4. Armistice 4:32; 5. In a Persian Market 5:46; 6. Karelia 2:47; 7. Wagons-Lits 4:03; 8. Sofia 4:21; 9. Classical Gas 3:50; 10. Georges Nagelmackers 4:30
To Gen Kyo (12″-LP)	1991	1. Rydeen 4:43; 2. Asian Woman 7:08; 3. Sogenno Tobira 4:00; 4. Let's Take A Coffee 5:32; 5. Shanghai Tsukiyo 5:01; 6. Mythological Falls 4:45; 7. One Note Samba 4:57; 8. La Femme Chinoise 4:16; 9. Gekka Bijin 4:18; 10. Shin Nihon Kikoh 2:45; 11. Let's Take A Coffee (Extended Version 7:21
Space Polyphony (CD)	21 September 1992	1. Man-Yoh Densetsu; 2. Symmetry Dance; 3. Mongolian Rhapsody; 4. Shiroi Irowa Kobitono Iro; 5. 3.33 • • •; 6. Usu-Beni-Roman; 7. Views & Visitor; 8. Voyager; 9. Merry Christmas Mr. Lawrence; 10. Hana
Impressive Express Vol.1 (CD)	21 March 1993	1. Kandoh Express Opening Theme 0:21; 2. The Boy's Dream (Main Theme) 3:00; 3. Little Nomads (Crossing The Peak) 4:03; 4. Winds Of A Pilgrim (The Mountain Of Gods) 3:21; 5. The Salt Road 2:38; 6. Along The Karnali River 2:50; 7. At The Border Market 3:35; 8. Autumn In The Humla Valley 3:09; 9. Green Paradis 3:27; 10. India Of Spiritual Revival (Main Theme) 2:27; 11. Sacred Waters Of The River Ganges 2:27; 12. Valley Of The Flowers 2:54; 13. Mother Earth 2:39; 14. Road Into The Distance 2:17; 15. Ponboore (Prayers For Shiva) 2:13; 16. Meditation 2:06
Mystery of Life (CD)	21 November 1993	1. Mystery Of Life; 2. Direction; 3. Tomi To Eika; 4. Ancient City Of Sigiriya; 5. Kurenai No Umi; 6. Elephant Parade; 7. Southern Island; 8. Lines On The Snow; 9. Kanashimi No Trap; 10. Mother Nature; 11. Diamond Dust; 12. Aurora
Patch Work [Unreleased 1983–1990] (CD)	2003	1. The Air 4:56; 2. Northern Lights 4:50; 3. Additional Text 2:46; 4. Kaleidoscope 4:06; 5. Progress 3:05; 6. Take Pine 3:44; 7. Traffic Circuit 3:51; 8. Urban Night 3:09; 9. Metamorphosis 14:17
History of Logic System (CD; Japanimport)	28 May 2003	1. Intro; 2. Domino Dance; 3. Convulsion of Nature; 4. Talk Back; 5. Person To Person; 6. Logic; 7. Morpheus; 8. Plan; 9. Automatic Collect, Automatic Correct; 10. Prophet; 11. Equivalent; 12. Overture; 13. Orient Express; 14. Simoon; 15. Wagon-Lits; 16. Sofia; 17. Georges Nagelmackers; 18. Ano subarashii ai o moo ichido (Neuaufnahme); 19. Min-yo(ru)-hitsuji (Neuaufnahme)
Tansu Matrix (CD)	2008	1. Turning Point - Epilogue; 2. Hypnotize; 3. Wandering On The Road; 4. Digiphone; 5. 桜繚乱; 6. Thousand Knives; 7. Sweet Memories; 8. Nenkororo (MOSH); 9. Left-Handed Woman; 10. Love; 11. Y.M.C.A.; 12. A Long Cool Rain; 13. Go!! Rise!! Cow!!; 14. Land of 1000 Dances; 15. Some Enchanted Evening; 16. Turning Point - Prologue
Electric Carnaval 1982 (CD)	2010	1. Overture 0:51; 2. Orient Express 6:43; 3. MC1 1:28; 4. Sunshine Of Your Love - Armistice 9:06; 5. MC2 0:54; 6. OTAKEBI 3:29; 7. Wagon-Lits 3:57; 8. Prophet 5:03; 9. MC3 1:01; 10. Karelia 2:50
Technasma (CD)	2020	1. Overture 2:38; 2. Crisis 3:33; 3. Time Seeds 5:26; 4. Mondrian's Square 4:18; 5. Closing//Glassworks 5:22; 6. Golden Ratio 5:03; 7. Aqua Aura 2:56; 8. 妖踊 5:05; 9. Contact 5:15; 10. Revive 5:21
