= Peter Barakan =

English DJ, broadcaster, and author (born 1951)

- Born: 20 August 1951 (age 75); London, England
- Education: SOAS, University of London
- Occupation: Radio Broadcaster
- Years active: 1984–present
- Television: Begin Japanology; Offbeat & Jazz
- Spouse: Mayumi Yoshida
- Children: 2
- Family: Shane Fontayne (brother)
- Musical career
- Website: peterbarakan.net

Peter Barakan (born 20 August 1951) is an English DJ, freelance broadcaster, and an author of books on music and English language education. He is best known as the presenter of Begin Japanology and Japanology Plus on NHK World. In Japan, he is known as the radio host of "Barakan Beat" on InterFM, "Weekend Sunshine" on NHK FM, and Lifestyle Museum on Tokyo FM. Barakan also curates "Live Magic!", presented by CreativeMan Productions, Tower Records, and InterFM. It is a two-day festival intent on promoting obscure western artists to a wider Japanese audience.

== Early life ==
Peter Barakan was born in London, England to an Anglo-Burmese mother and a Jewish father of Polish ancestry, and raised with his younger brother, musician Shane Fontayne. After attending junior high school, he graduated from SOAS, University of London.

== Career ==
=== Early career (1974–1988) ===
Barakan moved to Tokyo, Japan in early 1974, after accepting a job offer as a clerk at a music publishing company in Japan. In the early 80's, after his departure as a clerk, Barakan began contributing to magazines and hosting a radio show as a freelancer, as well as writing lyrics and handling international marketing for the Japanese band Yellow Magic Orchestra. In October 1988, with his start as host of the late-night weekly TBS program "CBS Document" (a Japanese edition of 60 Minutes), Barakan's popularity grew, especially among Japanese eager to study English, and among Americans starved for broadcasts from their home country.

=== Radio (1980–present) ===
Barakan was the host for a radio show in Roppongi for approximately 9 years. Starting in 1996, he was a host for 3-hour slot named "Barakan Morning " on InterFM radio which ended in 2011.

He is currently hosting "Barakan Beat", a live show on InterFM, "Weekend Sunshine", a freestyle program on NHK FM, and Lifestyle Museum, 30-minute weekly interview programme on Tokyo FM.

=== Television (2003–present) ===
Barakan's broadcast experience eventually led him to NHK's Japanology in 2003, where he is more well known internationally for exploring aspects of traditional and contemporary Japan, including interviews with experts in various fields. As the show progressed, he eventually became the sole presenter where he is more able to express his creative freedoms.

He also acts as a presenter alongside his Japanese co-host for Offbeat & Jazz, a monthly show on satellite broadcaster WOWOW, featuring live performances by mainly jazz artists.

== Social issues ==
During the 2011 Fukushima Daiichi nuclear disaster, Barakan was prevented from playing a nuclear protest song, because it could "create 'fuhyou higai', which means 'damage from rumors'".

Similarly, in 2014, Barakan was pressured by two broadcast stations (other than InterFM) to steer clear of commenting on nuclear power issues.

In 2012, he led a U.N. sponsored multi-city mayoral panel discussion on community rebuilding following the 2011 Tōhoku earthquake and tsunami.

== Personal life ==
Barakan is married to Mayumi Yoshida, and has a son and a daughter.

== Filmography ==
=== Film ===
Year	Title	Role	Notes
1983	Merry Christmas, Mr. Lawrence	Prisoner (uncredited)	
1984	In A Forest of Feathers	Various	Short
1984	YMO Propaganda	Soundtrack	
2005	The Old Crocodile	Narrator (English version)	Short

=== Television ===
Year	Title	Role	Notes
2003–2008	Weekend Japanology	Self / Presenter	TV series documentary
2008–2014	Begin Japanology	Self / Presenter	TV series documentary
2014–present	Japanology Plus	Self / Presenter	TV series documentary
2009	CBS Document	Self / Presenter	TV series documentary
2004	Eigo de shabera-night	Self / Presenter	TV series
2009	The Golden Hour	Self / Presenter	TV series
2010	Schola: Sakamoto Ryûichi ongaku no gakkô	Self / Presenter	TV series
2015	Morning Cross	Self / Presenter	TV series
2019	The Best Hit USA	Self / Presenter	TV series
2011	Yellow Magic Orchestra Live at NHK	Soundtrack	TV movie

== Bibliography ==
- Taking Stock (2020)
- 新版魂（ソウル）のゆくえ (2019)
- Cotton Fields (2020)
- ロックの英詞を読む—世界を変える歌 (2016)
- ピーター・バラカンのわが青春のサウンドトラック (2013)
- ピーター・バラカン音楽日記 (2011)
- ラジオのこちら側で (2013)
- ぼくが愛するロック名盤240 (1998)
- ジャズ・ロックのおかげです (1994)
- 200CD ピーター・バラカン選 ブラック・ミュージック (2009)
- ピーター・バラカンのわが青春のサウンドトラック (2009)
- 猿はマンキ お金はマニ (2009)
- 魂（ソウル）のゆくえ (2008)
- ロックの英詞を読む (2003)
- Love Songs – A Kiss Is Just A Kiss (1993)
- ミュージック捜査線 (1993)
- 魂（ソウル）のゆくえ (1989; republished in 2008)
