= Alfa Records =

Japanese record label

Alfa Records Inc. アルファレコード
- Parent company: Sony Music Publishing (Japan) Inc. (2001–present); Sony Music Labels Inc.(2022–present)
- Founded: 1969 (1977 as an independent label)
- Founder: Kunihiko Murai
- Distributors: Victor Musical Industries (1977–1982); Warner-Pioneer (1982–1991); Nippon Columbia (1991–1994); Toshiba-EMI (1994–2001); Sony Music Distribution (Japan) Inc.(2001–2014); Sony Music Marketing United Inc.(2014–2019); Sony Music Solutions Inc. (2019–present)
- Country of origin: Japan
- Location: Tokyo

Alfa Records Inc. (アルファレコード株式会社, Alfa Record Kabushiki Gaisha), originally a publisher known as Alfa Music Ltd. and later succeeded by record company Alfa Music Inc., was established in 1969 by composer and record producer Kunihiko Murai. It was formed into an independent record label known as Alfa Records in 1977. A short-lived American subsidiary operated from 1980 to 1982.

== History ==
In December 1980, Alfa Records opened a U.S. subsidiary in Los Angeles, planning to specialize in a "global approach to music". The label had some U.S. Top 40 successes in 1981 with Lulu, whose two-year-old recording of "I Could Never Miss You (More Than I Do)" became a Top 20 hit on Alfa, as well as former The Guess Who singer Burton Cummings ("You Saved My Soul") and Billy Vera and the Beaters ("I Can Take Care Of Myself"). Vera's "At This Moment" was also originally released on Alfa and reached No. 79 on the Billboard chart in late 1981, five years before it was re-released on Rhino Records and became a nationwide No. 1 smash. Other U.S. Hot 100 success came with singles by Yutaka featuring Patti Austin ("Love Light") and The Monroes ("What Do All The People Know?"), and the label also branched out into country music with the Corbin/Hanner Band. However, the American subsidiary ceased operations in July 1982 due to "slow market conditions", and although the shutdown was intended to be temporary, the subsidiary never reopened.

Back home in Japan, the company faced much hardship in the 1990s. Due to financial troubles from the collapse of their previous diversification into foreign automobile dealerships, the record label was reformed into a new company "Alfa Music" in 1994. 1995 saw the closure of their Shibaura "A" Studio (as used by Yellow Magic Orchestra and other artists). In October 1998, operations were scaled back and Alfa withdrew from record production.

In April 2001, Sony Music Publishing (Japan) Inc. (a subsidiary of SMEJ) gained worldwide distribution rights for Alfa's back catalogue – re-issues have appeared on the Sony Music Direct (Japan) Inc. label for domestic releases and Epic for international sales. In April 2019, Alfa became a wholly owned subsidiary, and an internal division, of Sony Music Publishing (Japan) Inc.

Alfa were partners with A&M Records, Zomba Music and Mute during the 1980s and 1990s for Japanese domestic distribution.

== Imprint labels ==
=== Yen Records ===
Yen Records (often printed as "¥EN") was an imprint that ran from 1982 to 1985 fronted by Haruomi Hosono and Yukihiro Takahashi of Yellow Magic Orchestra. Most albums were produced by Hosono or Takahashi, and mainly focused on Japanese new wave music.

=== Alfa International ===
Alfa International was a sublabel which mainly published international (mostly European) releases of various music styles, including Italo disco, Eurobeat (Italo disco and Hi-NRG), Europop, synthpop and Eurodance.

=== GMO Records ===
GMO (Game Music Organisation) was a label for chiptune and video game music releases. Several albums were released including music from Sega, Konami, Hudson, Capcom, and Tecmo games. The album Video Game Music (featuring music from Namco games), and the related Super Xevious 12" single by former Happy End and Yellow Magic Orchestra member Haruomi Hosono, were released on Yen before the formation of GMO.

=== Spin ===
Spin primarily released remix collections of material from the Alfa back catalogue and licensed albums from British labels. Active between 1990 and 1994.

== Notable signed artists ==
=== Japanese artists ===
- Yumi Arai (1972–1976)
- Akai Tori (1969–1974) and its offshoots:
  - Hi-Fi Set (1975–1978)
  - Kamifusen (1974–1976)
- Casiopea
- Jun Fukamachi
- Garo
- Ayumi Ishida
- Chu Kosaka
- Izumi Yukimura
- Chiharu Matsuyama
- The Stalin
- P-MODEL (1985–1986)
- Soft Ballet
- Yuzo Koshiro
- Hiroshi Sato (1982–1993)
- Yellow Magic Orchestra
  - Haruomi Hosono (1978–1982)
  - Ryuichi Sakamoto (1980–1981)
  - Yukihiro Takahashi (1981–1985)
- Minako Yoshida (1978–1983)
- Toshifumi Hinata

==== Yen Records ====
- Jun Togawa
- Sandii & the Sunsetz
- Miharu Koshi
- Hajime Tachibana (from Plastics)
- Guernica
- Koji Ueno
- Inoyama Land

YMO, Hosono and Takahashi solo albums were also released on Yen during 1982–1985

=== Foreign acts licensed by Alfa ===
This list includes artists with records released on Alfa's short-lived U.S. subsidiary.

- Alessandra Mussolini
- Chris Connor
- Corbin/Hanner Band
- DVC
- Depeche Mode
- Erasure
- The Police
- Falco
- Robin Scott
- Lulu
- Max Q (Michael Hutchence & Ollie Olsen)
- Kylie Minogue
- The Monroes
- PIG
- Russ Freeman
- Billy Vera & the Beaters
- Elegy (1992–1995)
- Swamp Terrorists
- Telex
- Parish (Former members of Crimson Glory)
- George Benson
- Yutaka Yokokura
