= World Tour 1980 =

WORLD TOUR 1980

Live album by Yellow Magic Orchestra
- Released: May 22, 1996
- Recorded: 16 (London) & 27 (Paris) October, 7 November 1980 (LA)
- Venues: Hammersmith Odeon, London (tracks 1–5, 13, 18–19); Théâtre Le Palace, Paris (tracks 7–9, 12); A&M The Chaplin Stage, Hollywood (tracks 6, 10–11, 14–17)
- Genres: Art rock; electronic rock; jazz fusion; techno; synthpop
- Length: 1:31:00
- Label: Alfa Music

Yellow Magic Orchestra chronology
OVER SEAS COLLECTION (1995)	WORLD TOUR 1980 (1996)	LIVE AT GREEK THEATER 1979 (1997)

WORLD TOUR 1980 is a live album by Yellow Magic Orchestra. It was recorded during the band's 1980 international tour (their second after the 1979 Trans Atlantic Tour). This is the only YMO live album to include songs originally released on X∞Multiplies; it also features six songs from YMO members made for other projects and two covers. It was released, with a book with photographs taken during the tour, as both a 2-CD set and a 3-LP set (with 3–5 songs spread over 5 sides), which had a bonus track. "Jiseiki Hirake Kokoro" was originally made for a Fujifilm cassette commercial. It was included in Snakeman Show's self-titled album in mono so that the lyrics, which reference Fujifilm cassettes, could not be understood properly; it was presented here in stereo, and was included in the UC YMO compilation.

== Track listing ==
All tracks arranged by YMO, except "Maps" & "Jiseiki Hirake Kokoro" by YMO with Kenji Omura, "Zai Kung Tong Boy" & "Tong Poo" by Akiko Yano and "Invention" by the Roland Corporation and Hideki Matsutake.

Disc 1
No.	Title	Lyrics	Music	Length
1.	"Riot in Lagos"		Ryuichi Sakamoto	7:10
2.	"The End of Asia"		Sakamoto	6:04
3.	"Behind the Mask"	Chris Mosdell	Sakamoto, Yukihiro Takahashi	3:41
4.	"Rydeen" (雷電 Raidīn)		Takahashi	4:45
5.	"Maps"	Mosdell	Takahashi	5:25
6.	"Nice Age"	Mosdell	Sakamoto, Takahashi	3:42
7.	"The Core of Eden"	Mosdell	Takahashi	6:42
8.	"Citizens of Science"	Mosdell	Sakamoto	4:27
9.	"La Femme Chinoise" (中国女 Chūgoku Onna)	Mosdell	Takahashi	5:49

Disc 2
No.	Title	Lyrics	Music	Length
10.	"Solid State Survivor"	Mosdell	Takahashi	3:59
11.	"Radio Junk"	Mosdell	Takahashi	4:12
12.	"Zai Kung Tong Boy" (在広東少年 Zai Kanton Shōnen)	Akiko Yano	Yano	7:05
13.	"Firecracker"		Yellow Magic Orchestra, Martin Denny	4:43
14.	"1000 Knives" (千のナイフ Sen no Naifu)		Sakamoto	7:44
15.	"All You Need Is Love"	Lennon–McCartney	Lennon–McCartney	1:42
16.	"Technopolis"		Sakamoto	4:14
17.	"Cosmic Surfin'"		Haruomi Hosono	4:20
18.	"Tong Poo" (東風 Ton Pū)		Sakamoto	4:02
19.	"Invention"		Johann Sebastian Bach	1:14

LP Version bonus track (Side F)
No.	Title	Lyrics	Music	Length
20.	"Jiseiki Hirake Kokoro" (磁性紀－開け心－) (Original Stereo Version)	Hosono	Sakamoto, Takahashi	3:25

== Track information ==
- "Riot in Lagos" was originally included in Sakamoto's 1980 album B-2 Unit.
- "The End of Asia" is performed in the style of Sakamoto's version from his 1978 album Thousand Knives.
- "Maps" was originally included in Omura's 1981 album Spring is Nearly Here.
- "The Core of Eden" was originally included in Takahashi's 1980 album Murdered by the Music.
- "Zai Kung Tong Boy" (also known as "Kang Tong Boy") was originally included in Yano's 1980 album Gohan ga Dekita yo.
- "1000 Knives" was originally included in Thousand Knives and was included later on YMO's 1981 album BGM.
- "Tong Poo" is performed in the style of Yano's version from Gohan ga Dekita yo.
- "Invention" is a fast-paced rendition of Bach's "Invention No. 1" (BWV 772), a demo song that was listed on the Roland MC-8 manual.

== Personnel ==
- Haruomi Hosono – Bass (Music Man StingRay) on "Tong Poo", Synth bass (Sequential Circuits Prophet-5, ARP Odyssey Mk II)
- Ryuichi Sakamoto – Keyboards (Prophet-5, ARP Odyssey Mk III, Polymoog, Roland Jupiter-4), Vocoder (Roland VP-330) on "Behind the Mask", Drum machine (Linn LM-1)
- Yukihiro Takahashi – Drums, Electronic drums (Ult-Sound DS-4 Custom, Pollard Syndrum 477), Lead vocals on "Nice Age", "The Core of Eden", "Citizens of Science", "La Femme Chinoise", "Solid State Survivor", "Radio Junk" and "All You Need is Love"
- Hideki Matsutake – Modular synthesizer (Moog IIIC, Moog Modular Model 15, Korg PS-3100, E-mu Modular 2000), Sequencer (Roland MC-4B, MC-8), Programming
- Akiko Yano – Keyboards (Prophet-5, Oberheim Eight Voice), Backing vocals on "Nice Age", "Solid State Survivor", "Radio Junk" and "All You Need is Love", Lead Vocals on "Zai Kung Tong Boy"
- Kenji Omura – Guitar (Fender Stratocaster), Lead vocals on "Maps", Backing vocals on "Nice Age", "Solid State Survivor", "Radio Junk" and "All You Need is Love"
- Tomoko Ebe Nunoi – Sampled Sexy Voice on "La Femme Chinoise"

=== Technical personnel ===
- Kimitoshi Sato – Supervising, Planning, Selection, Compilation
- Mitsuo Koike – Mixing
- Yukimasa Okumura – Art Direction
- Masaki Yoshimi, Nobuo Yoshida/THE STUDIO TOKYO JAPAN INC. – Design
- Yukihiro Takahashi/BRICKS-MONO – Costume Design
- Nobuo Yoshida – Copy Coordination
- Kenji Narukawa – Coordination Support
- Shiro Tsubata/ALFA MUSIC – Manager
- Mikio Honoda, Kenji Miura, Toshi Yajima, Hiro Ito, Junichi Takahashi, Tetsuo Tanaka, Tomoaki Sato/FUJIHOUSE, Hiroshi Tanaka/NHK, Miki Tayama, Kazuhiko Naruze/TIGHTEN UP and ALL BEAUTIFUL YMO FREAKS – Special Thanks
