= Saravah! =

Studio album by Yukihiro Takahashi
- Released: June 21, 1978
- Recorded: Alfa Studio "A", Shibaura, Minato, Tokyo
- Genre: Kayokyoku
- Length: 35:58
- Label: Seven Seas (King Records)
- Producers: Yukihiro Takahashi, Ryuichi Sakamoto

Yukihiro Takahashi chronology
Saravah! (1978)	Murdered by the Music (1980)

Saravah! is the debut solo studio album by Japanese multi-instrumentalist Yukihiro Takahashi, released on June 21, 1978.

The album is named after Pierre Barouh's record label of the same name and Claude Lelouch's A Man and a Woman. Takahashi conceived the album during his time as the drummer for the Sadistic Mika Band, as he felt dissatisfied with the band's direction. The album is inspired by French New Wave music and film, and the works of artists such as Boz Scaggs and Burt Bacharach.

On October 24, 2018, Saravah! was reissued as Saravah Saravah!, with Takahashi re-recording all of his vocals, as he had been unhappy with his vocal performance on the original album.

== Track listing ==
All tracks are written by Yukihiro Takahashi, except where noted. All song arrangements and production by Takahashi (rhythm) and Ryuichi Sakamoto (brass, strings and keyboards).

No.	Title	Lyrics	Music	Length
1.	"Volare (Nel Blu Dipinto di Blu)"	Domenico Modugno, Franco Migliacci	Modugno, Matteo Treppiedi	2:26
2.	"Saravah!"			4:03
3.	"C'est si bon"	André Hornez, Jun'ichi Nakahara	Henri Betti	3:12
4.	"La Rosa"		Kazuhiko Katō	5:04
5.	"Mood Indigo"	Irving Mills	Duke Ellington, Barney Bigard	2:51
6.	"Elastic Dummy"	instrumental	Sakamoto	5:03
7.	"Sunset"			4:04
8.	"Back Street Midnight Queen"	Takahashi, Chris Mosdell		4:15
9.	"Present"			4:46

== Personnel ==
- Yukihiro Takahashi – Vocals, Drums
- Ryuichi Sakamoto – Keyboards (Acoustic Piano, Fender Rhodes, KORG PS-3100, ARP Odyssey, Hammond organ)
- Haruomi Hosono – Electric Bass
- Shigeru Suzuki – Electric guitar (1, 3–4, 8–9)
- Motoya Hamaguchi – Percussion (1, 3–6, 8–9)
- Rajie – Backing Vocals/Choir (1, 3, 7, 9)
- Tsunehide Matsuki – Electric guitar (2, 4, 6–7)
- Kazuhiko Katō – Acoustic guitar (2, 4–5)
- Nobu Saitō – Percussion (2, 7)
- BUZZ – Backing Vocals/Choir (3, 7, 9)
- Kenji Omura – Electric guitar (4)
- Tatsuo Hayashi & Hiroshi Imai – Percussion (4)
- Tatsuro Yamashita & Minako Yoshida – Backing Vocals/Choir (6, 8)
- Lisa Akikawa & Friends – Clapping (6)
- Akira Wada – Electric guitar (7–8)
- Masayoshi Takanaka - Electric guitar (9)
- Seiichi Chiba – Recording & Mixing Engineering
- Kenji Andoh & Shigeyuki Kawashima – Direction
- Masayoshi Sukita – Photography
- Noa Planning – Design
- Hiroshi Tanaka – Management

== See also ==
- 1978 in Japanese music
