= Faker Holic =

Live album by Yellow Magic Orchestra
- Released: 1991
- Recorded: Venue, London, 16 October 1979 & 24 October 1979, Le Palace, Paris, 18 October 1979, Bottom Line, New York, 6 November 1979
- Genre: Dance, electro-funk, electronic rock, techno, experimental, J-pop, synthpop, world, exotica, progressive rock
- Length: 135:57

Yellow Magic Orchestra chronology
YMO BEST SELECTION (1990)	Faker Holic (1991)	KYORETSU NA RHYTHM (1992)

Faker Holic: YMO World Tour Live is a live album by Yellow Magic Orchestra. The material on this live album was recorded during various concerts in 1979, and was released as a double CD in 1991. Several songs appeared on the 1980 live album Public Pressure, with Kazumi Watanabe's guitar parts overdubbed with keyboards and Yukihiro Takahashi's vocals replaced with those re-recorded later in studio. This album restores Watanabe's guitar parts (but not Takahashi's vocals). "Kang Tong Boy" is a song by Akiko Yano, who performed additional keyboards and backing vocals on this tour.

== Track listing ==
Disc one: London/Paris
No.	Title	Writer(s)	Length
1.	"Castalia"	Ryuichi Sakamoto	3:28
2.	"Rydeen"	Yukihiro Takahashi	5:02
3.	"Behind the Mask"	Sakamoto, Chris Mosdell	3:11
4.	"Cosmic Surfin"	Haruomi Hosono	3:42
5.	"Radio Junk"	Takahashi, Mosdell	4:31
6.	"Insomnia"	Hosono, Mosdell	4:57
7.	"La femme chinoise"	Takahashi, Mosdell	5:58
8.	"Technopolis"	Sakamoto	5:04
9.	"Solid State Survivor"	Takahashi, Mosdell	4:00
10.	"Day Tripper"	Lennon–McCartney	2:44
11.	"Firecracker"	Martin Denny	5:05
12.	"The End of Asia"	Sakamoto	6:11
13.	"1000 Knives"	Sakamoto	8:45
14.	"Tong Poo"	Sakamoto	6:41
Total length:			69:19

Disc two: New York City
No.	Title	Writer(s)	Length
1.	"Rydeen"	Takahashi	4:52
2.	"Behind the Mask"	Sakamoto, Mosdell	3:08
3.	"Radio Junk"	Takahashi, Mosdell	4:03
4.	"Solid State Survivor"	Takahashi, Mosdell	3:51
5.	"Kang Tong Boy"	Akiko Yano	6:06
6.	"Tong Poo"	Sakamoto	6:41
7.	"Day Tripper"	Lennon–McCartney	2:45
8.	"1000 Knives"	Sakamoto	7:52
9.	"Rocket Factory"	Yellow Magic Orchestra	4:00
10.	"La femme chinoise"	Takahashi, Mosdell	5:55
11.	"Firecracker"	Denny	4:41
12.	"Cosmic Surfin"	Hosono	3:27
13.	"The End of Asia"	Sakamoto	9:17
Total length:			66:38 (135:57)

== Charts ==
Chart (1991)	Peak position	Weeks	Sales
Oricon Albums Chart	50	4	21,000
