= Murdered by the Music =

Studio album by Yukihiro Takahashi
- Released: June 21, 1980
- Studio: CBS/Sony Roppongi Studio, Tokyo
- Genre: Pop music, Synthpop, Technopop
- Length: 42:20
- Label: Seven Seas (King Records)
- Producer: Yukihiro Takahashi

Yukihiro Takahashi chronology
Saravah! (1978)	Murdered by the Music (1980)	Neuromantic (1981)

Professional ratings
Review scores
Source	Rating
Sounds	4.5 stars

Murdered by the Music, also known as Ongaku Satsujin (Japanese Kanji: 音楽殺人) in Japan, is the second studio album by Japanese multi-instrumentalist Yukihiro Takahashi, released on June 21, 1980 by Seven Seas via King Records. Murdered by the Music was released whilst Takahashi was an active member of the Yellow Magic Orchestra. As well as his YMO bandmates Ryuichi Sakamoto and Haruomi Hosono, and longtime YMO collaborator Hideki Matsutake, the album also features contributions from Sandii and Makoto Ayukawa of Sheena & the Rokkets.

In Japan, the album reached No. 12 on the general Oricon chart, and No. 14 on the Oricon LP chart.

== Track listing ==
All lyrics are written by Chris Mosdell; all music is composed by Yukihiro Takahashi, except where noted.

No.	Title	Lyrics	Music	Length
1.	"School of Thought"		Ryuichi Sakamoto	4:12
2.	"Murdered by the Music"		Takahashi, Makoto Ayukawa	3:40
3.	"Kid-Nap, the Dreamer"			3:00
4.	"I-Kasu!"	instrumental		1:12
5.	"Radioactivist"			3:14
6.	"Numbers from a Calculated Conversation"			4:36
7.	"Bijin-Kyoshi at the Swimming School"	instrumental		4:08
8.	"Blue Colour Worker"		Haruomi Hosono	4:28
9.	"Stop! In the Name of Love"	Holland–Dozier–Holland	Holland–Dozier–Holland	3:19
10.	"Mirrormanic"			3:33
11.	"The Core of Eden"			6:25

== Personnel ==
- Yukihiro Takahashi - Producer, Arranger, Lead Vocals, Vocoder, Drums, Percussion
- Ryuichi Sakamoto - Synthesizers, Synthesizer Programming, Electric & Acoustic Piano, Vocoder
- Haruomi Hosono - Acoustic Guitar, Bass Guitar
- Sandii - Backing Vocals
- Hideki Matsutake - Computer Operator
- Kenji Omura - Electric Guitar
- Makoto Ayukawa - Electric Guitar
- "Teppei" Kasai - Engineer
- Toshiro Itoh - Engineer
- Seiichi Chiba - Recording Engineer
- Chris Mosdell - Lyrics, Quasimutanic voice

Staff

- Mitsuru Torii - Art Direction
- "Bricks" - Costume
- "Donbay" Nagata - Equipment Co-ordinator
- Mikio Honda - Hair & Make Up
- Hiroshi Okura - Management
- Yoichi Itoh - Production Co-ordinator
- Kenji Ando - Recording Director
- Masayoshi Sukita - Photography

== See also ==
- 1980 in Japanese music
