= Public Pressure =

Live album by Yellow Magic Orchestra
- Released: February 21, 1980
- Recorded: 16 & 24 October 1979 at The Venue, London (tracks 1–4); 2–4 August 1979 at the Greek Theatre, Los Angeles (track 5); 6 November 1979 at The Bottom Line, New York City (tracks 6–8); 19 December 1979 at the Nakano Sun Plaza, Nakano (track 9)
- Genre: Electronic, electro, experimental, new wave, synthpop
- Length: 42:24
- Label: Alfa Records
- Producer: YMO with Haruomi Hosono

Yellow Magic Orchestra chronology
Solid State Survivor (1979)	Public Pressure (1980)	X∞Multiplies (1980)

Public Pressure (公的抑圧, Kōteki yokuatsu; Public pressure) is Yellow Magic Orchestra's first live album, released on February 21, 1980.

== Recording ==
The album was recorded during three dates of the group's first tour of Europe and the US. The group toured as a six-piece, but guitarist Kazumi Watanabe was mixed-out and replaced with more keyboards due to contractual matters between record labels. Un-dubbed recordings from this tour were later released on the album Faker Holic. Most of Yukihiro Takahashi's vocals were also replaced with those re-recorded afterward in studio. These were not restored on Faker Holic.

The first half of the album was recorded live at The Venue in London. "Cosmic Surfin'" was recorded at The Greek Theatre in Los Angeles while the second side was recorded at The Bottom Line in New York City by John Venable using the 2nd Generation Record Plant Remote Truck.

== Reception ==
The album was Yellow Magic Orchestra's second number-one album in Japan, setting a record of 250,000 copies sold within two weeks of release.

== Track listing ==
Side one
No.	Title	Lyrics	Music	Length
1.	"Rydeen"		Yukihiro Takahashi	5:08
2.	"Solid State Survivor"	Chris Mosdell	Takahashi	4:01
3.	"Tong Poo"		Ryuichi Sakamoto	6:01
4.	"The End of Asia"		Sakamoto	6:51

Side two
No.	Title	Lyrics	Music	Length
1.	"Cosmic Surfin'"		Haruomi Hosono	4:35
2.	"Day Tripper"	Lennon–McCartney	Yellow Magic Orchestra, Lennon–McCartney	2:42
3.	"Radio Junk"	Mosdell	Takahashi	4:19
4.	"La femme chinoise"	Mosdell	Takahashi	6:15
5.	"Back in Tokio"		Yellow Magic Orchestra	1:52

== Personnel ==
Yellow Magic Orchestra – arrangements, electronics, mixing engineers, producers

- Haruomi Hosono – bass guitar, synth bass
- Ryuichi Sakamoto – keyboards, vocoder, drum machine
- Yukihiro Takahashi – drums, electronic drums, vocals
- Hideki Matsutake – modular synthesizers, sequencers, programming

Guest musicians

- Akiko Yano – keyboards, backing vocals
- Tomoko Nunoi (uncredited) – French narration/sexy voice (sampled) on "La femme chinoise"

Staff

- Kunihiko Murai and Shōrō Kawazoe – executive producers
- Norio Yoshizawa – recording and mixing engineer
- Mitsuo Koike – recording engineer
- Masayoshi Sukita – photography
- Heikichi Harata (WXY, Inc.) – artwork
- Lou Beach (uncredited) – logo type

== Charts ==
Year	Release	Chart	Peak position	Weeks	Sales
1980	LP	Oricon LP Chart	1	36	285,000
1980	Cassette	Oricon CT Chart	6	42	109,000
2022	Album	Oricon Albums Chart	63	4	9,000
		Japan			403,000

== See also ==
- 1980 in Japanese music
