= Jacks (band) =

Japanese rock band

- Also known as: Nightingale
- Origin: Japan
- Genres: Psychedelic rock, folk rock
- Years active: 1965–1969
- Past members: Yoshio Hayakawa; Suehiro Takahashi; Eri Matsubara; Haruo Mizuhashi; Hitoshi Tanino; Takasuke Kida; Hiro Tsunoda

Jacks (Japanese: ジャックス, Hepburn: Jakkusu) were a 1960s Japanese psychedelic rock band, who released their best known studio album Vacant World in 1968. In 2003, they were ranked by HMV Japan at number 82 on their list of the 100 most important Japanese pop acts.

== History ==
High school classmates Yoshio Hayakawa, Suehiro Takahashi and Eri Matsubara formed the folk trio Nightingale (ナイチンゲイル) in 1965. When Matsubara left in the summer of 1966, the other two continued as a duo until Hitoshi Tanino asked to join as bassist in January 1967, despite having never played the instrument before. When Hayakawa suggested they change their name to "Beat Jacks", Tanino suggested dropping the first word, leading to the new name "Jacks". Takahashi left the group that May, and drummer Kosuke Kida joined. Haruo Mizuhashi joined in June, and Jacks began performing as a quartet with Hayakawa on vocals, Kida on drums, Tanino on bass and Mizuhashi on guitar. Vacant World, released in September 1968 as Jacks no Sekai in Japanese, is widely seen as one of the most important Japanese albums. The song "Vacant World" was famously banned from Japanese airwaves due to lyrical content.

When Mizuhashi left, Kida recruited Hiro Tsunoda to be drummer in the autumn of 1968, while he switched to saxophone, flute and vibraphone. On a training camp in March 1969, the instrumentalists of Jacks recorded tapes for what became Yasumi no Kuni (休みの国), a project led by Teruyuki Takahashi, who was their driver. During a concert on July 25, 1969, Jacks announced that they were disbanding. Their last performance was during the first Zennihon Folk Jamboree event on August 9 (although they took the stage at 4 AM on August 10). The band's second studio album, Super Session, or Jacks no Kiseki in Japanese, was released on October 10, 1969. The reason for the breakup was that Hayakawa had made the decision to quit. Tsunoda later noted that Hayakawa did not like that he had brought in keyboardist Hideo Fujita to work on their second album. Tanino stated that, around that time, the personalities of the other band members were starting to come forward as everyone was writing songs and suggested Hayakawa did not like how his own personality began to fade into the background.

After the breakup of Jacks, Takasuke Kida, Hitoshi Tanino and Hiro Tsunoda continued to play with Yasumi no Kuni. Yoshio Hayakawa released one acclaimed solo album and worked at URC Records before retiring from music. He re-emerged as a solo artist in 1994 and formed the band Ces Chiens in 2003 before retiring again in 2018. Tsunoda formed Flied Egg with Shigeru Narumo and Masayoshi Takanaka, and was the original drummer of the Sadistic Mika Band. Kida was a member of The Natarshar Seven from 1975 to 1980 and released a solo album just months before dying in a car accident on May 18, 1980. After leaving Jacks in 1968, Haruo Mizuhashi worked behind the scenes as a record producer and manager, before forming the Haruo Mizuhashi Group with Tanino in 2015. Mizuhashi died of heart failure on August 5, 2018.

== Musical style ==
Jacks played in a distinct musical style fused with ambient psychedelic, surf, folk and jazz. The group had a dark, introspective sound with an exploratory, improvisational edge and sometimes headed into moody instrumental excursions. Jacks typically employed reverb, tremolo and subtle fuzz-guitar and also utilized the vibraphone, organ and wind instruments such as the flute. Lead singer Yoshio Hayakawa sung in Japanese and typically ranged from a low, calm and tranquil voice to throaty, desperate sounding wails. Similarly, drummer Takasuke Kida would follow suit, going from subtle jazzy sounding fills to complicated, offbeat rhythms and manic cymbal crashes.

== Members ==
- Yoshio Hayakawa – vocals, rhythm guitar
- Suehiro Takahashi – vocals
- Eri Matsubara – vocals
- Haruo Mizuhashi – lead guitar, vocals
- Hitoshi Tanino – bass guitar, upright bass
- Takasuke Kida – drums, flute, vibraphone
- Hiro Tsunoda – drums

== Discography ==
=== Albums ===
- Vacant World (ジャックスの世界, Jacks no Sekai) (Toshiba Express, September 10, 1968)
- Super Session (ジャックスの奇蹟, Jacks no Kiseki) (Toshiba Express, October 10, 1969)
- Jacks' Greatest Hits (Toshiba Express, 1972)
- Live '68'7'24 (H.A.F., 1973 - fan club release)
- Echoes in the Radio (Toshiba Eastworld, Match 31, 1986, live studio recordings)
- Jacks Show (Solid Records, April, 25, 1989, live album)
- Live, 15 Jun. 1969 (Super Fuji Discs, April 21, 2021, live album)
- 2nd Jacks Show, Jul. 24, 1968 (Super Fuji Discs, August 25, 2021, live album)
- Last Stage (Super Fuji Discs, October 25, 2023, live album)

=== Singles ===
- "Karappo no Sekai" b/w "Iikodane" (Takt/Million, March 1968)
- "Marianne" b/w "Tokei wo Tomete" (Takt Million, May 1968)
- "Karappo no Sekai" b/w "Tokei wo Tomete" (Columbia, September 1968)
- "Kono Michi" b/w "Karappo no Sekai" (album version) (Toshiba Express, October 1968)
- "Joe's Rock" b/w "Flower" (Toshiba Express, October 1969)
