= Juichi Yoshikawa =

Japanese calligraphist, or sho artist (born 1943)

Juichi Yoshikawa (吉川 壽一, Yoshikawa Jūichi, born 1943 in Fukui) is a Japanese calligraphist, or sho artist, who studied calligraphy formally under Inamura Undo, and later with Ueda Sokiu. Yoshikawa's avant garde trademark "three and a half dimensions" style applies observation as the additional dimension. To an untrained observer, this approach might be characterized as artistic flamboyance known by the use of giant brushes and stadium-sized canvases - or, as in the large 1990 Beijing installation, by almost completely covering the 5,000 square metres of Tiananmen Square.

Yoshikawa's work has been presented throughout Japan, China, and the Middle East, and he is the author of a 1993 French publication on his form, Sho.

He has collaborated several times with the lyricist, Chris Mosdell, illustrating what are essentially poetic works with experimental calligraphy. The first collection, Shake the Whole World To Its Foundations (2001 Shichosha Publishing), is an epic rhythmical chant densely type-set on the page with delicate and often simple brush-stroke accompaniments. The second publication, The Erotic Odes: A Pillow Book, couples verse by Mosdell with digitally stylized erotic shunga woodcut prints from the Edo Era overlaid with sensual calligraphy and ink-seepage creations by Yoshikawa. A full-color edition, originally published by Libroport in 1997, was fully color-enhanced and re-printed in 2008 by Seigensha Publishing.
