= Neuromantic (album) =

Studio album by Yukihiro Takahashi
- Released: May 24, 1981
- Recorded: March – May 1981
- Studio: Various: Alfa Studio "A", Shibaura, Minato, Tokyo; AIR Studios, Westminster, West End, London; Gallery Studio, Chertsey, Runnymede, Surrey
- Genre: Synthpop, new wave
- Length: 40:38
- Label: Alfa, ¥EN
- Producer: Yukihiro Takahashi

Yukihiro Takahashi chronology
Murdered by the Music (1980)	Neuromantic (1981)	What, Me Worry? (1982)

Professional ratings
Review scores
Source	Rating
AllMusic	4/5 stars

Neuromantic (Japanese: ニウロマンティック) is the third studio album by Japanese multi-instrumentalist Yukihiro Takahashi, released on May 24, 1981 by Alfa Records. Self-produced, the album featured Takahashi's YMO colleagues Haruomi Hosono and Ryuichi Sakamoto, as well as contributions from Tony Mansfield of New Musik and Roxy Music's Phil Manzanera and Andy Mackay. The title is a pun on the early 1980s British fashion movement, the New Romantics.

== Track listing ==
All lyrics are written by Yukihiro Takahashi and Peter Barakan; all music is composed by Takahashi, except where noted

No.	Title	Lyrics	Music	Length
1.	"Glass"			6:03
2.	"Grand Espoir" (大いなる希望 Ōinaru Kibō)	Haruomi Hosono, Barakan	Hosono	4:38
3.	"Connection"			5:05
4.	"New (Red) Roses" (神経質な赤いバラ Shinkeishitsuna Akai Bara)	instrumental	Takahashi, Kenji Omura	3:49
5.	"Extra-Ordinary" (非・凡 Hi-Bon)			4:26
6.	"Drip Dry Eyes"	Chris Mosdell		5:31
7.	"Curtains"		Ryuichi Sakamoto	3:41
8.	"Charge"	instrumental		2:34
9.	"Something in the Air" (予感 Yokan)			4:51

== Personnel ==
- Yukihiro Takahashi – vocals, drums, keyboards, mixing
- Haruomi Hosono – keyboards
- Ryuichi Sakamoto – keyboards
- Kenji Omura and Phil Manzanera – guitars
- Tony Mansfield – keyboards, backing vocals
- Andy Mackay – saxophones, oboe
- Hideki Matsutake – computer programming and operation
- Shoro Kawazoe – executive producer
- Yukimasa Okumura, Hiromi Kanai, Tomohiro Itami – artwork
- Mitsuo Koike – engineer
- Steve Nye – engineer, mixing
- Ian Little, Renata Blauel, Yoshifumi Ito – assistant engineer
- Masayoshi Sukita, Sheila Rock – photography
- Kazusuke Obi – artist relations
- Hiroshi Kato, Toshi Yajima – recording coordination
- Lorraine Kinman – stylist
- Takeshi Fujii – equipment
- Peter Barakan, Yoichi Ito – management

== See also ==
- 1981 in Japanese music
