= What, Me Worry? (album) =

Studio album by Yukihiro Takahashi
- Released: June 21, 1982
- Genre: Pop music, Synthpop, Technopop
- Label: Yen Records (Alfa Records)
- Producer: Yukihiro Takahashi

Yukihiro Takahashi chronology
Neuromantic (1981)	What, Me Worry? (1982)	Tomorrow's Just Another Day (1983)

What, Me Worry?, also known in Japan as Boku, Daijōbu!! (ボク、大丈夫!!), is the fourth solo studio album by Japanese multi-instrumentalist Yukihiro Takahashi, released on June 21, 1982 by Yen via Alfa Records. As well as his YMO bandmates Ryuichi Sakamoto and Haruomi Hosono, this album features guest appearances by Zaine Griff, Tony Mansfield, and Bill Nelson.

In Japan this album reached No. 35 on the Oricon LP chart.

== Track listing ==
All lyrics are written by Yukihiro Takahashi and Peter Barakan; all music is composed by Takahashi, except where noted.

No.	Title	Lyrics	Music	Length
1.	"What, Me Worry?"	instrumental		1:05
2.	"It's Gonna Work Out" (きっとうまくいく Kitto Umaku Iku)			4:00
3.	"Sayonara"	Takahashi		5:33
4.	"This Strange Obsession"	Zaine Griff	Griff	3:42
5.	"Flashback" (回想 Kaisō)	Takahashi	Ryuichi Sakamoto	5:17
6.	"The Real You" (本当の君 Hontō no Kimi)			4:45
7.	"Disposable Love" (使いすてハート Tsukai Sute Hāto)			4:29
8.	"My Highland Home in Thailand"	instrumental	Takahashi, Bill Nelson	1:11
9.	"All You've Got to Do" (すぐそこにある Sugu Soko ni Aru)			3:31
10.	"It's All Too Much" (すべて 素晴らしすぎる Subete Subarashi Sugiru)	George Harrison	Harrison	4:41

2005 re-issue bonus tracks
No.	Title	Lyrics	Music	Length
11.	"Futari no Kage Ni" (二人の陰に)	Takahashi		4:37
12.	"Disposable Love" (使いすてハート Tsukai Sute Hāto) (Japanese Version)			4:28
13.	"Ich bin der glücklichste Mensch auf der Welt" (白銀は招くよ Shirogane wa Maneku yo, I am the Happiest Person in the World)	Franz Grothe, trans. Toshio Fujita	Grothe	4:00

== Personnel ==
- Yukihiro Takahashi - Keyboards, Drums, Percussion, Vocals, Producer
- Haruomi Hosono - Bass, Vocals
- Ryuichi Sakamoto - Keyboards
- Bill Nelson - Guitar, E-Bow
- Zaine Griff - Vocals
- Tony Mansfield - Vocals
- Mitsuru Sawamura - Saxophone
- Kohji Ueno - Keyboards
- Ronny - Vocals
- Hiroshi Sato - Keyboards
- Kenji Omura - Guitar
- Hajime Tachibana - Artwork, Design
- Julian Mendelsohn - Engineer
- Mitsuo Koike - Engineer
- Steve Nye - Engineer
- Yoshifumi Iio - Engineer
- Akitsugu Doi - Assistant Engineer
- Jeremy Allom - Assistant Engineer
- Stuart Bruce - Assistant Engineer

== See also ==
- 1982 in Japanese music
