= Vacant World =

Studio album by Jacks
- Released: September 10, 1968
- Genre: Psychedelic rock, folk rock
- Length: 37:58
- Label: Toshiba Express

Jacks chronology
Vacant World (1968)	Super Session (1969)

Professional ratings
Review scores
Source	Rating
AllMusic	3/5 stars
Keikaku	favorable

Vacant World, also known as Jacks no Sekai (ジャックスの世界), is the first studio album by the Japanese rock band Jacks. It was released on September 10, 1968. In 2007, Rolling Stone Japan placed it at number 13 on its list of the "100 Greatest Japanese Rock Albums of All Time".

== Track listing ==
All music is composed by Yoshio Hayakawa, except where noted.

No.	Title	Lyrics	Music	Length
1.	"Marianne" (マリアンヌ)	Yasuko Aizawa		5:20
2.	"Stop the Clock" (時計をとめて)	Haruo Mizuhashi	Mizuhashi	4:16
3.	"Vacant World" (からっぽの世界)			4:57
4.	"In the Broken Mirror" (われた鏡の中から)			3:23
5.	"Gloomy Flower" (裏切りの季節)			3:20
6.	"Love Generation" (ラブ・ジェネレーション)			3:36
7.	"Bara Manji" (薔薇卍)	Hitoshi Tanino	Tanino	2:29
8.	"Where?" (どこへ)	Yasuko Aizawa	Takasuke Kida	3:10
9.	"Love" (遠い海へ旅に出た私の恋人)	Aizawa		4:23
10.	"500 Miles from the Sky" (つめたい空から500マイル)		Mizuhashi	3:02

== Personnel ==
Credits adapted from the liner notes.

- Yoshio Hayakawa – vocals, rhythm guitar
- Haruo Mizuhashi – lead guitar, backing vocals
- Hitoshi Tanino – bass guitar
- Takasuke Kida – drums, flute
