= Sandi A. Hohn =

Musician and vocalist

- Also known as: Sandii
- Born: Aya Suzuki; December 27, 1952 (age 73)
- Origin: Tokyo, Japan
- Genres: J-pop, synth-pop、Hawaiian Music
- Instruments: Singer, songwriter
- Years active: 1974–present
- Labels: Trio, Pineapple, Toho, EMI Eastworld, Alfa, Ten, Toshiba EMI, Rock, Sushi CD, Epic, Taboo Disc

Sandi A. Hohn (born 鈴木 あや, Suzuki Aya, renamed in the U.S. as Sandra O'Neale, born December 27, 1952), professionally known as Sandii, is a Japanese singer and vocalist who was a member of the Japanese band Sandii & the Sunsetz. Hohn is also notable for her work on the Japanese animated television series Lupin III Part II.

== Life ==
Hohn was born in Tokyo to a Japanese mother and an American father of Irish and Spanish ancestry. Her father was in the U.S. Navy and she spent her early life in Japan, but in her early teens, she was adopted and moved to Hawaii, where she began learning hula and Pacific dance. (She changed her name to Sandra O'Neale at this time.) After becoming accomplished as a singer and dancer, Sandii released her first record "Perusha Neko" under the name Sandi Ai in 1974. Returning to Japan in 1975 she was befriended by Kyu Sakamoto, who helped her to get a job as a DJ on NHK TV in Japan. Sandii performed during the interval of the "World Popular Song Festival" in late 1975 and secured a record deal with Toho. Sandii's debut album, "Sandi Ai", is a mix of Japanese originals and covers of well-known songs by John Lennon and Olivia Newton-John. The album was not a great success and Sandii left Toho for Discomate Records.

In 1976 Sandii performed at the Yamaha World Popular Song Festival as a non-competitor interval act and the next year she won the prestigious “Grand Prix Best Vocal Performance” award with the single Goodbye Morning, her best selling record to date.

Sandii met Makoto Kubota in 1976, when he was a guest on her NHK TV show and afterward joined his band Yuyake Gakudan ("Sunset Gang") as a backup singer. Makoto was an accomplished musician with broad influences and the collaboration went on to be critically acclaimed, though never quite achieving the popular success expected. The music of The Sunset Gang was very influenced by blues, Southern and West Coast rock, but later they became increasingly interested in Hawaiian and Okinawan music. At this time Sandii also became friends with the future members of the Yellow Magic Orchestra, frequent collaborators with the Sunset Gang; Haruomi Hosono naming her "Sandii" because of the connection with Hawaii. However, until 1980 Sandii used a variety of names for different session work e.g. "Sandra Hohn", "Sandi A. Hohn", even "Sandy Ayako".

On the soundtrack of Lupin The Third Sandii performed the songs "I Miss You Babe" and "Love Squall"; the latter was a single release paired with the theme of the TV series by Yuji Ohno.

In 1978, Sandii sang the end title theme for the Japanese release of Agatha Christie's Death on the Nile, which became a top 20 hit in Japan. This gave Sandii and Makoto the opportunity to record a follow-up album. With limited time and budget, the album "Mystery Nile" consists of disco and pop cover versions including "Dancing Queen" by ABBA. Sandii and Makoto used fake English names on the record - "Sandy O'Neil" and "Theo Layer".

Other guest appearances include the albums "Dead End" and "Monkey Magic" by Godiego plus "Melting Pot" by Yamamoto Sho, whose backing band became Ippu-Do (including future Japan member Masami Tsuchiya.

In 1979, again using the name "Sandy O'Neil", Sandii released the disco track "Hey! King Kong", which failed to become a hit. The same year saw Sandii's first guest appearance with the Yellow Magic Orchestra on their 1980 album X00 Multiplies. In early 1980, Y.M.O. and Sandii began to record her debut for Alfa Records, "Eating Pleasure", featuring lyrics by Yellow Magic Orchestra lyricist, Chris Mosdell, who, as he had done for YMO's Solid State Survivor also wrote the bulk of the lyrics for "Eating Pleasure". At this point Makoto also wound up the Sunset Gang and Sandii & The Sunsetz were born. The two groups had the same members, but Sandii became lead vocalist. The collaboration with Mosdell would go on to produce some of the band's biggest hits over the next four years. Sandii and Makoto are on record as saying they were influenced by the sound and success of Blondie and later became friends with Debbie Harry and Chris Stein.

In 1996 Sandii recorded the first of her "Hawaii" albums and became increasingly involved in Hula culture. Sandii now runs two Hula schools, in Harajuku, Tokyo and Yokohama and has a TV series on NHK, contributing to the popularity of Hula dance in Japan and allowing Sandii to release roughly two albums a year of Hawaiian and other Pacific style music. In late 2005 Sandii achieved the rank of Kumu Hula and celebrated with an event at a shrine in Ise, with old friend Haruomi Hosono providing the music.

== Discography ==
=== Singles ===
- (as Sandi Ai) "Sandi Ai" (Toho Records, 1975) (included the singles "Ai No Melody" and "Kuzitsuke no yurushite")
- (as Sandi Ai) "Perusha Neko" (Pineapple Records Hawaii, USA, 1975)
- (as Sandy) "Goodbye Morning" (Discomate Records, 1976)
- (as Sandra Hohn) "Love Squall" (Vap Records, 1978)
- (as Sandy O'Neil) "Mystery Nile" (Toshiba-EMI, 1978)
- (as Sandy O'Neil) "Hey! King Kong" (Toshiba-EMI, 1979)
- "Drip Dry Eyes" (Alfa Records, 1980; lyrics: Chris Mosdell)
- (with Stephen Duffy) "Something Special" (Ten Records/Virgin, 1985)

=== Albums ===
- (as Sandi Ai) "Kutizukewayurushite" (1975) First CD release in August 2011 with bonus tracks of karaoke for 6 original songs. As indicated on the record jacket.
- (as Sandy O'Neil) "Mystery Nile" (1978)
- "Eatin' Pleasure" (1980)
- "Mercy" (1990)
- "Pacifica" (1992) Highest Oricon Ranking: #55.
- "Airmata" (1993)
- "Dream Catcher" (1994)
- "WATASHI" (1996)
- "Sandii's Hawaii" (1996)
- "Sandii's Hawaii 2nd" (1997)
- "Sandii's Hawaii 3rd" (1998)
- "Sings Pacific Lounge Classics featuring Lune Paolo" (1999)
- "Ukulele Dreaming" (2003)
- "Sandii's Lemurian Heart" (2004)
- "Sandii's Hawaii" 4th (2007)
- "Sandii's Tahitian Passions" (2007)
- "Moana Nui - Sandii's Tahitian Passions 2" (2008)
- "Sandii Beach" (2010)
- "Sandii's Hawaii 5th" (2011)
- "Sandii's Showa Hawaiian Ukulele Dreaming 2" (2011)
- "Sandii's Hawaii 6th Sandii's Hawaii Christmas" (2013)
- "Sandii's Hawaii 7th Island Style" (2013)
- "Te Pua No 'ano' a - Sandii's Tahitian Passions 3" (2015)
- "Hula Dub (2018)"

=== Compilations ===
- "Come Again" – Remixes and Rare Tracks (Eastworld, 1991)

=== Sandii with The Coconut Cups ===
- "Sandii with The Coconut Cups" (1999)
- "ALOHA GROOVIN'" (2000)

=== Sandii & The Coconut Cups ===
- "Mele O Aloha" (2006)

=== Sandii Bun Bun ===
- "Kabira" (2009)
- "Hirara" (2010)
