= Blue Moon Blue =

Studio album by Yukihiro Takahashi
- Released: March 15, 2006
- Genres: Synthpop, Electronica
- Label: Toshiba EMI

Blue Moon Blue is the nineteenth studio album by Japanese musician and singer Yukihiro Takahashi, released on March 15, 2006, by EMI Toshiba.

== Track listing ==
1. "Something New" (4:51)
2. "Blue Moon Blue" (4:47)
3. "A Star Is Born" (4:45)
4. "In Cold Queue" (4:48)
5. "Lay My Love (wr. Brian Eno, John Cale)" (5:18)
6. "I Like The Wright Brothers, But No Airplanes" (3:33)
7. "Still Walking To The Beat" (4:58)
8. "Exit To Reality" (3:29)
9. "Slow Turning Of My Heart" (4:46)
10. "Where Are You Heading To?" (4:11)
11. "In This Life" (5:04)
12. "Eternally" (4:25)

== Personnel ==
- Yukihiro Takahashi - lead Vocals, keyboards, drums
- Haruomi Hosono - bass (track 2)
- Hirofumi Tokutake - acoustic guitar (tracks 2, 12)
- Marke Newton - artwork
- Tomohiko Gondo - engineer (tracks 1, 2, 3, 5, 6, 10, 11, 12), Euphonium (tracks 5, 6, 12), Glockenspiel (tracks 1, 4, 5), melodica (tracks 2, 10), flugelhorn (track 1), trombone (track 2), programmer
- Yoshifumi Iio - engineer (tracks 7, 9)
- Tom Coyne - mastering
- Shunji Suzuki - acoustic guitar (track 6)
- Chiho Shibaoka - voice [Swedish] - (tracks 1, 2, 9)
- Albrecht Kunze - vocals (track 1)
- Yusuke Hayashi (track 6)
- Eriko Sekiya - voice (track 10)
- Yasuo Kimoto - engineer (track 8)
- Steve Jansen - producer (sound) (track 11)
