= Super Session (Jacks album) =

Studio album by Jacks
- Released: 1969
- Genre: Pop
- Label: Toshiba EMI

Jacks chronology
Vacant World (1968)	Super Session (1969)	Jacks' Greatest Hits (1972)

Super Session, also known as Jacks no Kiseki (ジャックスの奇蹟), is the second and last studio album by the Japanese psychedelic band Jacks, released in 1969. After the group's more acclaimed work Vacant World (1968), Super Session went in a new direction, more tailored to the 1960s Japanese pop scene. Though internationally obscure, the release is still in print by Toshiba/EMI Japan.

== Track listing ==
1. "Joe's Rock" (ジョーのロック) - 3:13
2. "Into Sea Foam" (この青い海に) - 3:37
3. "Rock for Fallin' Angel" (堕天使ロック) - 4:23
4. "Jailbirds" (運命の囚人) - 2:52
5. "To Love You" - 0:17
6. "Dm4-50" - 1:18
7. "Flower" (花が咲いて) - 5:53
8. "Catch You" (君をさらって) - 2:48
9. "Roll over Yuranosuke" (ロール・オーヴァー・ゆらの助) - 3:07
10. "How to Love" (ハゥ・トゥ・ラヴ) - 2:10
11. "Battlefield in My Head" (敵は遠くに) - 3:49

== Personnel ==
- Yoshio Hayakawa – vocals, rhythm guitar
- Takasuke Kida – vocals, saxophone, flute, drums, vibraphone, harmonica
- Hitoshi Tanino – electric bass
- Haruo Mizuhashi – lead guitar
- Hiro Tsunoda – vocals, drums
- Kazuhiko Kato – rhythm guitar on tracks 1, 2 and 4–6
- Hideo Fujita – piano on tracks 1, 2, 5 and 6
