= The Beatniks (band) =

Japanese alternative rock duo (1981–2023)

The Beatniks are an alternative rock duo formed by Yellow Magic Orchestra drummer/singer Yukihiro Takahashi and Keiichi Suzuki. The duo's debut album featured vocals mostly in English, with the rest in French.

In 2017, the band recorded the theme song for NHK TV's J-Melo, 'Softly Softly', in collaboration with Leo Imai.

In 2018 the band released their first album in seven years, Exitentialist A Xie Xie. They then undertook live performances, despite Takahashi's recently having had surgery on his eyes.

Yukihiro Takahashi died in 2023.

== Albums ==
- Exitentialism (1981) VAP, Inc.
- The Beatniks (1982) Statik Records
- Exitentialist A Go-Go (1987) T.E.N.T/Pony Canyon
- Another High Exit (1994) Vap (Remix of Exitentialism)
- The Show Vol.4 - Yohji Yamamoto Collection Music (1996)
- Mri: Musical Resonance Imaging (2001) Consipio Records
- LAST TRAIN TO EXITOWN (2011) EMI Music Japan
- Exitentialist A Xie Xie (2018) Better Days/Nippon Columbia

== Singles ==
- No Way Out/Le robinet 7" Vap 0018-07 (1981)
- River in the Ocean/Ark Diamant 7" Vap 10053-07 (1982)
- TOTAL RECALL/Chotto tsurainda (1987)
