= Rajie =

Japanese singer (born 1971)

Rajie ラジ
- Genres: City pop
- Occupation: Singer
- Instrument: Vocals
- Labels: CBS/Sony; Toshiba EMI
- Formerly of: Row; Pony Tail

Junko Sōma (相馬 淳子, Sōma Junko), known professionally as Rajie (stylized in all-caps or spelled as ラジ, Raji), is a Japanese singer. After performing as a member of Row and Pony Tail, she released five albums with CBS/Sony and two with Toshiba EMI. In the 2010s, her music regained attention amidst the city pop wave.

== Biography ==
Junko Sōma originally performed as part of the folk group Row and choral group Pony Tail. She also performed as a backup singer for Eiichi Ohtaki and the Sadistic Mika Band.

Rajie's first album, Heart to Heart, was released on 21 September 1977 and produced by Yukihiro Takahashi and Tsugutoshi Gotō. She later released four more albums with CBS/Sony: Love Heart (1978), Quatre (1979), Le Trottoir D'Apres Midi (1980), and Acoustic Moon (1981). One of Rajie's songs, "Itsuwari no Hitomi", was rearranged into one of Pink Lady's last singles before their 1981 disbandment, "Last Pretender". According to Makaino, Rajie's song "Love Heart" is an example of Yellow Magic Orchestra's technopop music, drawing comparisons to Haruo Chikada, Yuko Kanai, Sheena & The Rokkets, and Akiko Yano.

Following her five albums at CBS/Sony, Rajie moved to another label, Toshiba EMI, and released two albums with them: Relief (1984) and Espresso (1985), as well as a best hits album, New Best Now (1987). One of her songs, "Ruri-iro no Koibito-tachi", was an insert song for the 1984 NTV drama Ruri-iro Generation.

Rajie's music returned to attention as part of the city pop wave of the 2010s. Her song "Black Moon" was covered in Hitomitoi's 2012 album Your Time: Route #1. In February 2018, Sony Music released a best hits compilation of her music, named Golden Best: Rajie All Time Selection. One of her songs appeared on Yukihiro Takahashi's 2021 compilation album Grand Espoir. Ed Cunningham of Tokyo Weekender remarked that Rajie was one of several singers who helped transform the instrumental background of kayōkyoku into city pop. Her debut album appeared in Hitoshi Kurimoto's 2022 book "City Pop no Kihon" ga Kono 100-mai de Wakaru!, Her song "Hold Me Tight" appeared in the compilations City Pop Story: Urban & Ocean (2023) and City Pop Stories: '70s & '80s (2024).

== Discography ==
=== Original albums ===
Title	Details
Heart to Heart (stylized as HEART to HEART)	Released: 21 September 1977; Label: CBS/Sony
Love Heart	Released: 1978; Label: CBS/Sony
Quatre (キャトル)	Released: 1979; Label: CBS/Sony
Le Trottoir D'Apres Midi (真昼の舗道)	Released: 1980; Label: CBS/Sony
Acoustic Moon (stylized in all-caps)	Released: 21 November 1981; Label: CBS/Sony
Relief (午後のレリーフ)	Released: 1984; Label: Toshiba EMI
Espresso (エスプレッソ)	Released: 1985; Label: Toshiba EMI

=== Compilation albums ===
Title	Details
New Best Now (ニュー・ベストナウ)	Released: 1987; Label: Toshiba EMI
Golden Best: Rajie All Time Selection (ゴールデン☆ベスト ラジ ALL TIME SELECTION)	Released: 21 February 2018; Label: Sony Music Direct
