= Sadistic Mika Band =

Japanese rock band

- Also known as: The Sadistics; Sadistic Yuming Band; Sadistic Mikaela Band
- Origin: Osaka, Japan
- Genres: Rock; art rock; glam rock
- Years active: 1971–1975; 1975–1979 (Note: as The Sadistics); 1985 (Note: as the Sadistic Yuming Band); 1989 (Note: as the Sadistic Mica Band); 2006–2007 (Note: as the Sadistic Mikaela Band)
- Labels: Toshiba EMI/Doughnut, Harvest
- Past members: Kazuhiko Katō; Mika Katō; Yu Imai; Hiro Tsunoda; Yukihiro Takahashi; Ray Ohara; Tsugutoshi Gotō; Masayoshi Takanaka; Yumi Matsutoya; Kaela Kimura

The Sadistic Mika Band (Japanese: サディスティック・ミカ・バンド, Hepburn: Sadisutikku Mika Bando) was a Japanese rock band formed in November 1971 by husband and wife duo Kazuhiko Katō and Mika Katō. Japanese music journalist Toshio Nakamura has stated that at a time when it was still rare for women to sing in rock bands in Japan, the fact that the Katōs were a married couple was even more unusual; this, combined with their glam rock-influenced fashion, has been cited as ground-breaking for defying gender norms in the country. After releasing three studio albums and becoming the first Japanese rock band to tour the United Kingdom, the Sadistic Mika Band disbanded in November 1975 when the Katōs divorced.

In 2003, HMV Japan ranked the band at No. 94 on their list of the "Top 100 Japanese Pops Artists". In September 2007, Rolling Stone Japan rated their 1974 album Kurofune at No. 9 on its list of the "100 Greatest Japanese Rock Albums of All Time".

== History ==
After taking guitar lessons from Kazuhiko Katō, Mika Fukui of the folk duo Mika & Tonko starting dating The Folk Crusaders member. The two musicians married in Vancouver, Canada in July 1970. As Katō was already famous, the couple attracted much media attention, including an interview by the newly launched An An magazine. Impressed by the United Kingdom's burgeoning glam rock scene led by T. Rex and David Bowie, Katō set about forming a new group in his native Japan to emulate the style. Formed in November 1971, the Sadistic Mika Band initially consisted of Katō on guitar and vocals, Mika on vocals, and former Jacks drummer Hiro Tsunoda. Their name is a parody of John Lennon and Yoko Ono's Plastic Ono Band, with "sadistic" reportedly inspired by Mika's sadistic way of using knives in the kitchen. The group released the single "Cycling Boogie" on June 21, 1972. It was released on Doughnut Records, Japan's first private label that was founded by Katō and distributed by Toshiba EMI. Tsunoda subsequently left the band in September, replaced by Yukihiro Takahashi, with lead guitarist Masayoshi Takanaka and bassist Ray Ohara also joining the group. This lineup completed the band's self-titled debut album, which was released on May 5, 1973. Harvest Records released it in the United Kingdom. Katō passed the album to Malcolm McLaren who at the time had a shop with Vivienne Westwood, and McLaren passed it on to Bryan Ferry. Members of the Sadistic Mika Band also contributed to Shigeru Izumiya's 1973 album Hikari to Kage.

The band's second album Kurofune was recorded in England and released on November 5, 1974. Chris Thomas requested to produce the Sadistic Mika Band after hearing their first album. He also introduced Mika to Badfinger while he produced their LP Wish You Were Here. Her vocals can be heard on the track "Know One Knows" (translating Pete Ham's lyrics to Japanese). Keyboardist Yu Imai, who had previously worked as a support musician on the band's first album, was promoted to a full member. Kurofune sold poorly but is now considered a landmark in Japanese rock. In September 2007, Rolling Stone Japan rated it at No. 9 on its list of the "100 Greatest Japanese Rock Albums of All Time". In a retrospective review for OK Music, Naoto Kawasaki wrote that the Sadistic Mika Band were one of few Japanese rock groups at the time that could compete in the global market, and that the album was greatly influential on younger bands. Kawasaki noted that Mika's "eccentric" and "bad" singing drew criticism, but praised Kazuhiko's foresight in anticipating this trend, given how the style later gained prevalence in the 1980s with acts such as Debbie Harry and Strawberry Switchblade.

Ohara left the Sadistic Mika Band, and was replaced by support member Tsugutoshi Gotō. They played what turned out to be their last concert in Japan on September 21, 1975, at Kyoritsu Kodo. Throughout October 1975, the band played live in the United Kingdom supporting Roxy Music on the European leg of their Siren Tour, including a show at Wembley Arena. It was the first ever UK tour by a Japanese rock band. They were well received by the local music press, including Melody Maker and New Musical Express, and performed on British TV in between concerts. When they group performed "Time to Noodle" and "Suki Suki Suki" on the Old Grey Whistle Test on October 7, 1975, the letters spelling the name of the programme (usually shown hung from the back wall) were spelt as The Old Gley Whistle Test. The band also made an appearance on BBC TV's Pebble Mill at One and were interviewed by Jan Leeming. Photographs from this appearance were later published in the book S/M/B/2 (2006, Shinko Music) by Masayoshi Sukita, who was a close friend of the band.

However, offstage, the relationship between Kazuhiko and Mika was irreparable as Mika had been having an affair with their record producer Chris Thomas since around June 1974. Despite a triumphant homecoming concert planned by Toshiba EMI and the upcoming release of their third studio album, plans were scrapped when Mika refused to return to Japan with the rest of the band. The Thomas-produced Hot! Menu was released on November 5, 1975. The album was featured on BBC Radio 3's Sounds Interesting. However, the Sadistic Mika Band disbanded that same month, when Kazuhiko and Mika divorced. Recordings from the Roxy Music tour were released in July 1976 as the Live in London album. Takahashi, Takanaka, Imai, and Gotō continued to play together for several years under the name The Sadistics. They released two studio albums and two live albums before the band eventually petered out by 1979 as the members became busy with their solo careers and other projects. All members continued to work with Katō on his solo albums in the 1970s and 1980s.

== Post-disbandment ==
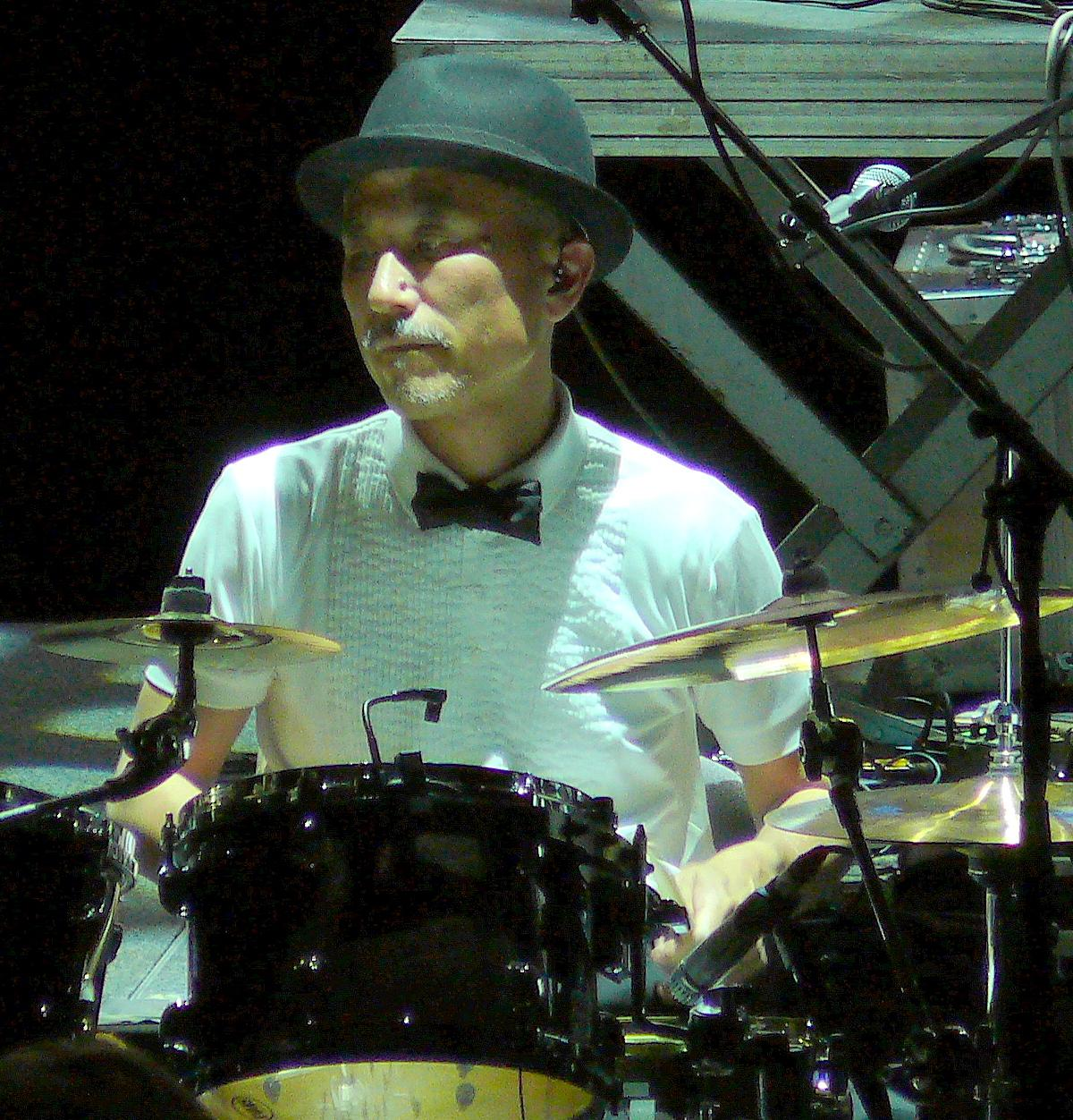
Takahashi performing in 2008

Kazuhiko Katō became a radio show presenter and a television personality in Japan. He had a successful solo career after the Sadistic Mika Band broke up; pursuing a ska direction before acquiring interest in European experimental music. Most of his solo work employed the talents of the other former Sadistic Mika Band members and other notable guest artists such as Ryuichi Sakamoto, Haruomi Hosono and Akiko Yano. He released two acoustic albums with Kōnosuke Sakazaki of The Alfee under the name Kazukoh in 2007 (Golden Hits) and 2009 (Happy End), and formed a new band called Vitamin-Q in 2008. They released one album featuring singer Anza.

Drummer Yukihiro Takahashi went on to become part of the synthpop trio Yellow Magic Orchestra. In the early 2000s, he formed the duo Sketch Show with Haruomi Hosono. In 2014, Takahashi formed the supergroup Metafive. He also acted in a number of films and TV shows, usually in comedic roles.

Ray Ohara was a regular member of Takahashi's band in the 1980s and 1990s. In 2019, Ohara, Shigeru Suzuki and Tatsuo Hayashi reunited their high school band Skye.

Mika married the band's producer Chris Thomas and moved to the UK. She appears on "Nice Age" from Yellow Magic Orchestra's 1980 album X∞Multiplies. After leaving Thomas, Mika joined a culinary school in the UK in 1983, and worked as a pastry chef. She released an autobiography in 1988, Mika no Chance Meeting, and another in 1996, Love & Kisses to England. She released a solo album in November 1994, Jaran Jaran, which she wrote entirely by herself. Mika moved back to Japan at the end of the 1990s, and continues to work on food research.

Tsugutoshi Gotō has released a large number of albums both solo, and as a member of various bands.

Yu Imai went on to form the group Imitation and collaborated with members of Sandii & the Sunsetz and Talking Heads. He was also the chief musical collaborator with English lyricist Chris Mosdell on three of his solo albums, Equasian (also with Kazuhiko Katō), The Oracles of Distraction, and Fingerprints of the Gods – the latter being the sonic setting of the Graham Hancock book of the same title.

Masayoshi Takanaka went on to become one of the most famous guitarists in Japan. He has been releasing studio albums and touring to this day.

== Reunions ==
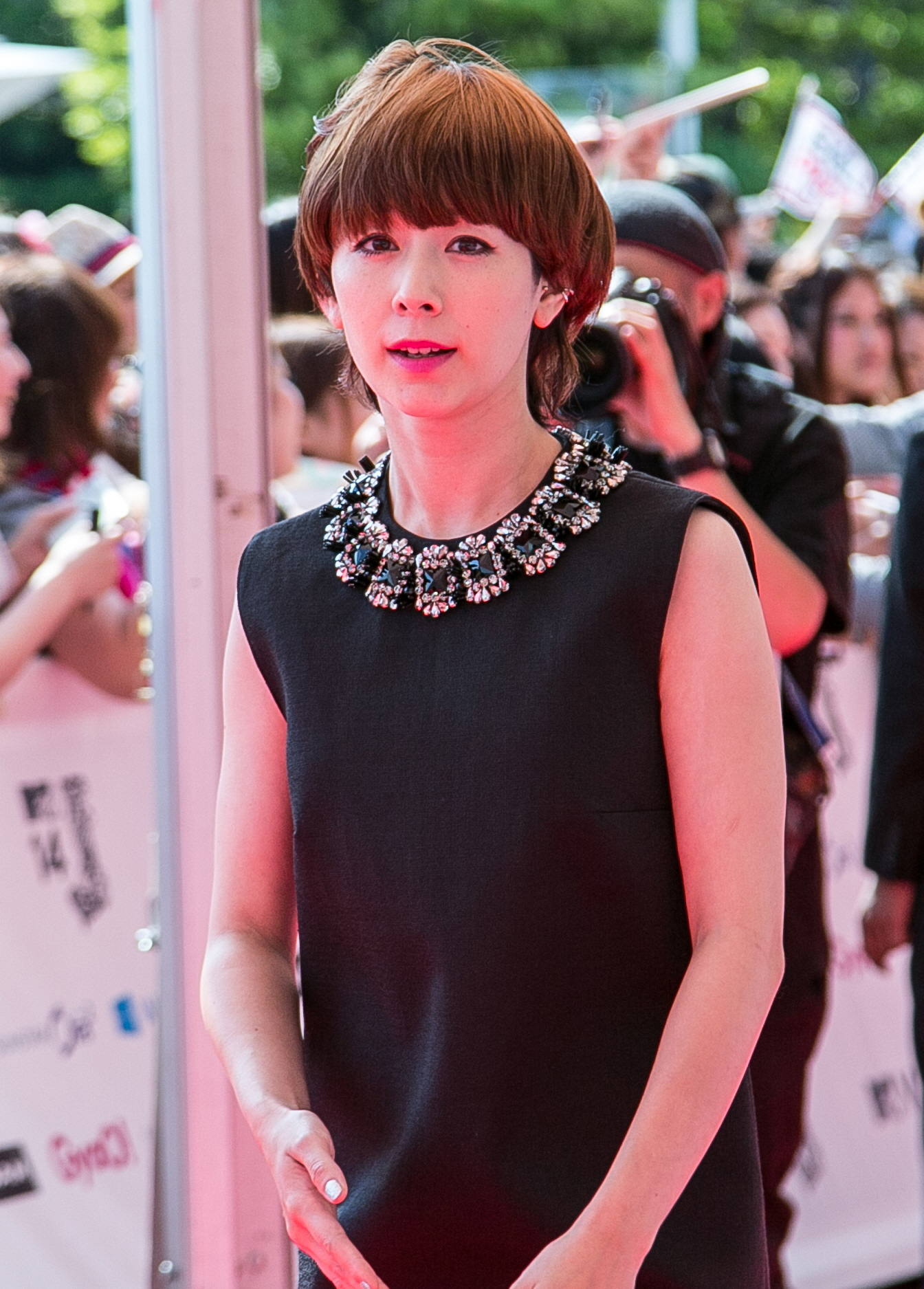
The Sadistic Mikaela Band was fronted by Kaela Kimura (pictured in 2014)

The band has reunited three times under different names. Kazuhiko Katō, Yukihiro Takahashi and Masayoshi Takanaka participated all three times, joined by a different female lead vocalist and supporting musicians.

In 1985, they reunited as the Sadistic Yuming Band to perform at the International Youth Anniversary All Together Now concert on June 15. Tsugutoshi Gotō returned on bass, Yumi Matsutoya (AKA Yuming) provided the female vocals, while Ryuichi Sakamoto played keyboards.

In 1989, the band reunited as the Sadistic Mica Band with Ray Ohara on bass instead of Gotō, and Karen Kirishima on vocals. Appare, an album of new material, was released on April 8, 1989. Its single "Boys & Girls" reached number 13 on the Oricon Singles Chart. The live album Seiten, recorded at Tokyo Bay NK Hall, followed on July 12, 1989.

In 2006, the core trio and Ohara teamed up with 22-year-old pop singer Kaela Kimura to become the Sadistic Mica Band Revisited for a Kirin Beer commercial. This lineup, now dubbed the Sadistic Mikaela Band, released the album Narkissos on October 25, which sold 92,568 copies and ranked number 147 on the yearly best-selling chart. The group also performed a one-night only concert at NHK Hall in Shibuya, Tokyo on March 8, 2007. It was recorded and released as the live album Live in Tokyo on May 23, 2007. A documentary film about the reunion was released in theaters on October 13, 2007, and on DVD on March 7, 2008.

Katō died by suicide on October 17, 2009, in Karuizawa, Japan. Takahashi died from aspiration pneumonia on January 11, 2023, also in Karuizawa.

== Members ==
- Kazuhiko Katō (加藤和彦) – vocals, guitar (1971–1975, 1985, 1989, 2006–2007)
- Mika (ミカ) – vocals (1971–1975)
- Hiro Tsunoda (つのだひろ) – drums (1971–1972)
- Yukihiro Takahashi (高橋幸宏) – drums (1972–1975, 1985, 1989, 2006–2007)
- Ray Ohara (小原礼) – bass (1972–1975, 1989, 2006–2007)
- Masayoshi Takanaka (高中正義) – guitar (1972–1975, 1985, 1989, 2006–2007)
- Yu Imai (今井裕) – keyboards (1974–1975)
- Tsugutoshi Gotō (後藤次利) – bass (1985, support member in 1975)
- Yumi Matsutoya (松任谷由実) – vocals (1985)
- Karen Kirishima (桐島かれん) – vocals (1989)
- Kaela Kimura (木村カエラ) – vocals (2006–2007)

== Discography ==
Studio albums

- Sadistic Mika Band (May 5, 1973)
- Kurofune (黒船; November 5, 1974)
- Hot! Menu (November 5, 1975)
- Appare (天晴; April 8, 1989)
- Narkissos (October 25, 2006)

Singles

- "Cycling Boogie" (サイクリング・ブギ; June 21, 1972)
- "Hi Baby" (ハイ・ベイビー; 1973)
- "Time Machine ni Onegai" (タイムマシンにおねがい; October 5, 1974)
- "Suki Suki Suki (Hei Made hi Tottobi)" (SUKI SUKI SUKI (塀までひとっとび); 1974)
- "Mada Mada Sanba" (マダマダ産婆; November 20, 1975)
- "Boys & Girls" (March 1, 1989)

Live albums

- Live in London (July 5, 1976)
- Seiten: Sadistic Mica Band Live in Tokyo 1989 (晴天 SADISTIC MICA BAND LIVE IN TOKYO 1989; July 12, 1989)
- Live in Tokyo (May 23, 2007)
- 1974 One Step Festival (November 21, 2018)

Compilation albums

- Best Menu! (August 1, 1977)
- 20 Songs to 21st Century (1989)
- Makunouchi (S.M.B. Super Best) (幕の内 (S.M.B. SUPER BEST); December 6, 1989)
- Beppin (別嬪; September 3, 1992)
- Golden☆Best (June 19, 2002)
- New Best 1500 (August 24, 2005)
- Cho-Beppin (超別嬪; May 24, 2006)
- Essential Best (March 21, 2018)

Home videos

- Seiten: Sadistic Mica Band Live in Tokyo 1989 (December 16, 2009)
