= Lexington Queen =

- レキシントンクイーン
- Former names: New Lex Edo, LEX TOKYO RED CARPET (NEW LEX)
- Address: Roppongi Crossing, Tokyo, Japan
- Location: Roppongi, Tokyo, Japan
- Type: Nightclub

Construction
- Opened: 1980
- Closed: 2006–2007 (remodeling)

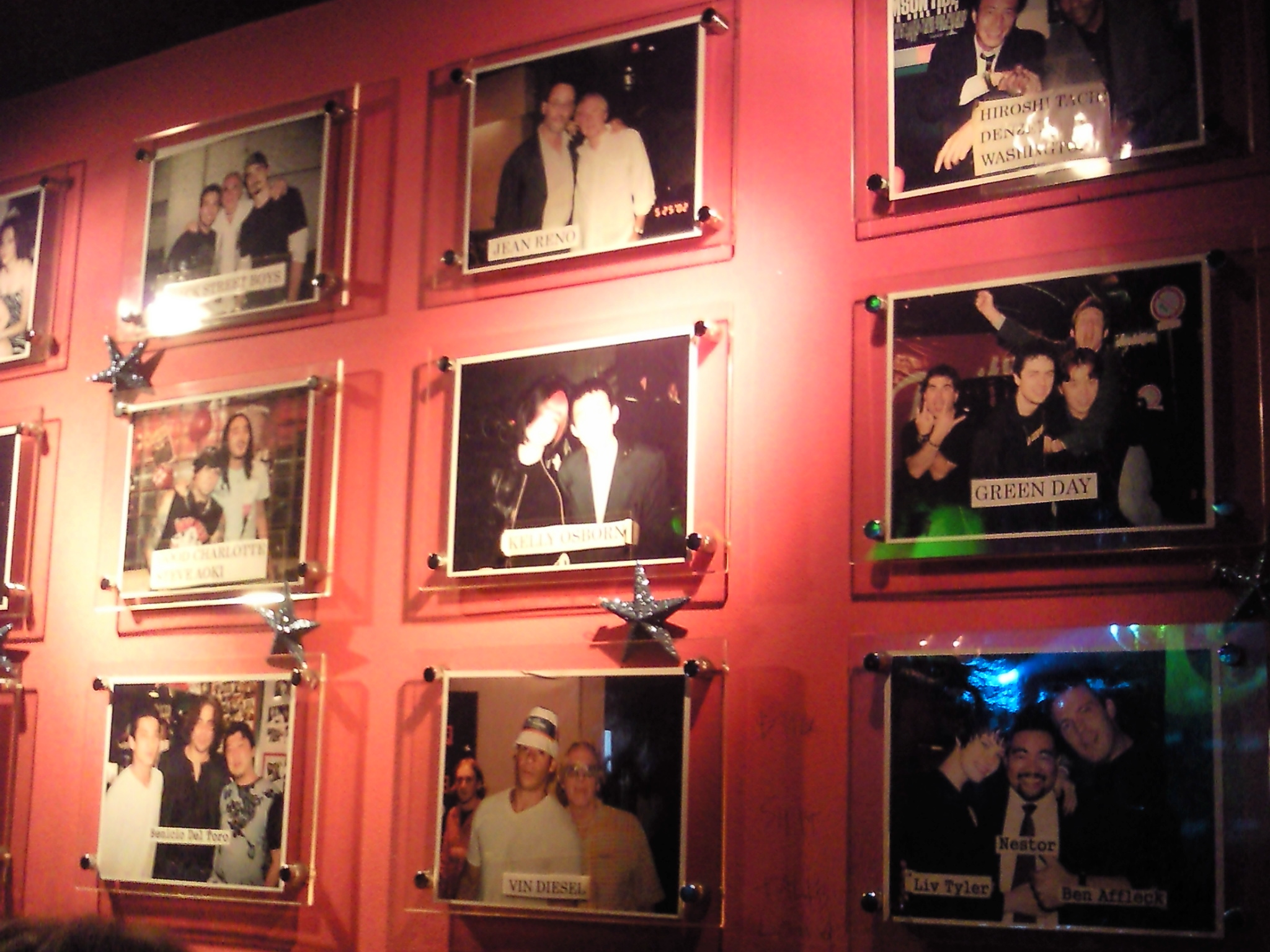
Photo gallery at the disco with celebrities and other visitors

Lexington Queen was a nightclub in Roppongi, Tokyo. The current name of the establishment was changed to The 'New Lex Edo', but it was often simply referred to by 'Lex'. Located underground near Roppongi Crossing, the club is a well-known and favorite hangout for models and celebrities on the rise. Opened in 1980, it is reputed to be a popular club amongst visiting celebrities, with past patrons including Gwen Stefani, Elton John, Roger Garth, Naomi Campbell, and Jude Law.

"Lex" was shut down between 2006 and 2007 for remodeling.

There is a passing reference to the Lexington Queen in the song "Bought for a Song" by American music group Fountains of Wayne and also in Kiss's 2015 single "Samurai Son"

The Big Audio Dynamite song "Sony" cites the club. It is also directly referenced in the Ryuichi Sakamoto song "Lexington Queen (Inside)" from his 1980 single "War Head/Lexington Queen". Glam Metal band Vain also mention the club in their song "Shooting Star", from their 1991 sophomore album "All Those Strangers".

In 2015, the club moved to a new location a few streets away and changed its name to "LEX TOKYO RED CARPET(NEW LEX)".
