= Kazuko Shiraishi =

Japanese poet (1931–2024)

- Born: 27 February 1931; Vancouver, British Columbia, Canada
- Died: 14 June 2024 (aged 93)
- Occupations: Poet, translator

Kazuko Shiraishi (白石 かずこ, Shiraishi Kazuko; 27 February 1931 – 14 June 2024) was a Japanese poet and translator who was born in Vancouver, British Columbia, Canada. She was a modernist, outsider poet who got her start in Katsue Kitazono's "VOU" poetry group, which led Shiraishi to publish her first book of poems in 1951. She also read her poetry at jazz performances. She appeared at readings and literary festivals all over the world.

Kenneth Rexroth called her "the Allen Ginsberg of Japan," and edited a volume of her poetry in English for New Directions Press.

Shiraishi died on 14 June 2024, at the age of 93.

== Translations available in English ==
Hiroaki Sato translated Shiraishi's poetry for BOMB Magazine, and several of her anthologies have appeared in English:

- Seasons of Sacred Lust. Translated by Ikuko Atsumi, John Solt, Carol Tinker, Yasuyo Morita, and Kenneth Rexroth. Edited by Kenneth Rexroth. New Directions Press, 1975.
- Cuttack and other Poems. Translated by John Solt. Shoshi-Yamada, Tokyo, 1985.
- Burning Meditation and other Poems. Translated by John Solt. Pink Sand Studio, Tōkyō, 1991.
- Little Planet and Other Poems. Translated by Allen Ginsberg, John Solt, Roger Pulvers, John Evans, Katsuya Hiromoto. Shichigatsudo, Tokyo, 1994.
- Sheep's Afternoon. Translated by John Solt, Tetsuya Taguchi, and others. With Etchings by Suzanne Treister. Shigetsusha, Higashiyamato-shi, Tokyo, 1997.
- Let Those Who Appear. Translated by Samuel Grolmes and Yumiko Tsumura. New Directions Press, 2002.
- My Floating Mother, City. Translated by Samuel Grolmes and Yumiko Tsumura. New Directions Press, 2009.
- Sea, Land, Shadow. Translated by Yumiko Tsumura. New Directions Press, 2017.
