= Chris Mosdell =

British writer (born 1949)

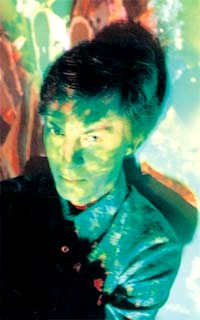
- Mosdell in 2000

Background information
- Born: Christopher John Mosdell; 9 November 1949 (age 76); Gainsborough, Lincolnshire, England
- Occupations: Lyricist, composer, poet, author
- Years active: 1976–present
- Label: Sony Music Japan
- Website: chrismosdell.com

Christopher John Mosdell (born 9 November 1949) is a British lyricist, poet, author, composer, vocalist and illustrator based in Tokyo, Japan, and New York City, United States.

He has collaborated with an extensive array of musicians and artists, though he is especially known for his work with Yellow Magic Orchestra and the poet Shuntarō Tanikawa. His interactive audio-visual album Equasian, featuring an experimentation with "VISIC" (visual music), melded his scientific background into a musical framework, and his Oracles of Distraction, a set of poetic cards set to musical coordinates, further expanded his lyrical idiom.

He has written lyrics for Sarah Brightman and Boy George; co-written lyrics with Michael Jackson, had his work covered by Eric Clapton, worked with the West African kora player Toumani Diabaté and the calligraphy artist Juichi Yoshikawa; and wrote the verse dance drama Amaterasu, the Resurrection of Radiance, that was performed with the City Ballet of London at the Theatre Royal, Drury Lane (2001).

As "Mozz", Mosdell has also released a series of award-winning children's books, which he also illustrates.

A film about his life entitled "Ink Music: In the Land of the Hundred-Tongued Lyricist", featuring interviews with many of his collaborators and shot in Japan and the United States, was released in 2009. The documentary bills him as the "Lafcadio Hearn of Lyrics", Long-term collaborator Ryuichi Sakamoto describes his interpretation of how Mosdell creates his varied works; "When I read his lyrics, I see him in a high school chemistry laboratory, making Molotov cocktails – his eyes lucid, blue and very clear."

In 2023 he was the recipient of Japan's Classics Day Cultural Foundation Prize, an award "honouring individuals who have contributed to the dissemination and enlightenment of Japanese classical culture" ––an award presided over by Her Imperial Princess Akiko of Mikasa.

== Biography ==
=== Early lyrical life ===
Mosdell was born in Gainsborough, England and grew up in North Wales. He moved to Tokyo in 1976 after completing a BSc (specialising in microbiology) from the University of Nottingham and withdrawing from a master's degree in pathology at the University of Exeter after realising his scientific leanings were at odds with his poetic interests. Arriving in Japan, he became a script-writer for NHK, numerous radio programs, a reporter for Radio Free Europe, and a reader of the BBC World Service radio news. His plays The Sound Seller (1977) and The Star Polisher (1978) were both produced for NHK and his collected television scripts, Laugh Out Loud (Asahi Publishing), were published in 1979—an edition that is still a popular text in Japanese universities today.

In 1977, a series of Mosdell's poems, published in the Japan Times, came to the attention of the drummer for the Sadistic Mika Band, Yukihiro Takahashi. Takahashi asked to use the poems as the lyrical base for pop singer Rajie, whose album he was producing.

Shortly afterward, Sadistic Mika Band disbanded, and some of the remaining members, including Takahashi, formed Sadistics as a follow-up act. Mosdell wrote the lyrics to the "Crazy Kimono Kids" and "Tokyo Taste" for their Sadistics album (1977).

=== Mainstream success ===
Takahashi continued to be a prime collaborator for Mosdell, inviting him to participate as the lyricist in his next musical endeavour, Yellow Magic Orchestra (YMO), who would go on to major success not only in Japan, but be one of the few Japanese acts to become known overseas as influential innovators in the field of popular electronic music. They helped pioneer synthpop and ambient house, helped usher in electronica, anticipated the beats and sounds of electro music, laid the foundations for contemporary J-pop, and contributed to the development of house, techno, and hip hop.

Mosdell's best-known YMO songs include "Behind the Mask", "Solid State Survivor", "Nice Age", "Insomnia", "La Femme Chinoise", and "Citizens of Science", from the albums Yellow Magic Orchestra (1978), Solid State Survivor (1979), and ×∞ Multiplies (1980)—lyrics envisaging a socially inert world, digitised and impersonal, and controlled by a forceful hidden authority within a landscape, essentially Japanese, but tinged with Chinese motifs.

The popularity and international influence of YMO made Mosdell a sought-after lyricist for other Japanese recording artists, as well as continuing as the central lyricist for the Yellow Magic Orchestra live album Public Pressure (1982). During this time Mosdell wrote chart-topping lyrics for other artists, including, among many others, Sandii and the Sunsetz, Sheena & The Rokkets, and Imitation.

Continuing his friendship and collaboration with the songwriters behind YMO, Mosdell also worked with these artists on their solo work, writing the bulk of the lyrics for Yukihiro Takahashi's Murdered by the Music solo LP, and the synthpop club single, "War Head" with Ryuichi Sakamoto. "War Head", originally titled "Night Boys Pick Up Some Heat", was written for the opening of the Roppongi nightclub Lexington Queen, but was so favoured by Sakamoto that he remixed it, with Mosdell performing vocals for the first time since YMO's "Citizens of Science", in a rap-styled lyrical rant.

The breadth of Mosdell's lyrical experimentation during this period led to his first solo recording. This resulted in the 1982 album Equasian, with its use of global ethnic sounds pre-dating the popularity of world music. It was also the first of Mosdell's efforts employing his visual lyrical and compositional technique, VISIC, which he used as the compositional basis for numerous other musical works. Equasian was showcased as an audio-visual/multimedia experience through live performances and a VISIC Exhibition at the Gallery Harajuku in Tokyo. For all its experimentation and relative obscurity, the record's relevance and popularity has continued up through recent times, being reissued as a gate-fold, full-color CD package by Sony in 2003.

=== International collaborations ===
During a period of increasing international collaborations, Mosdell travelled to Los Angeles to work with pop singer Boy George. They worked together on two single cuts ("Fireboy Meets His Match" and "All Prayers are Answered") for a Japanese shōchū television commercial that, although released for a few weeks, was suddenly withdrawn after the singer's brush with heroin.

In the same city, pop singer Michael Jackson recorded a cover of YMO's "Behind the Mask" for inclusion on his 1982 Thriller album. Producer Quincy Jones had heard the Yellow Magic Orchestra version on a trip to Japan and played it to Jackson, who decided to turn it from an electro-pop song into a dance-funk version, with additional lyrics by Jackson. Mosdell has said of the collaboration, "when Michael Jackson took it, it made it into a love song about a woman. It was a completely different premise to me, I was talking about a very impersonal, socially controlled society, a future technological era, and the mask represented that immobile, unemotional state. But hey, I let him have that one." An agreement to share the royalties equally between Sakamoto, Mosdell and Jackson broke down when the management of Yellow Magic Orchestra disagreed and it prevented the song to be released on Jackson's sixth studio album, Thriller, and remained unreleased for over 25 years.

The Michael Jackson version of the song "Behind The Mask" got its official release on 10 December 2010, as the ninth track on the posthumous album, Michael. It was described by Time magazine as "Michael's finest moment" and by NME as "something remarkable... an absolute revelation... actually brilliant."

The Mosdell-Sakamoto-Jackson version was later picked up by Jackson's keyboardist Greg Phillinganes for his 1984 album Pulse, and by Eric Clapton, for his August album, released in 1986.

"Sticky Music", was another international chart success for Mosdell, performed by Sandii and the Sunsetz, as it rose to Number 3 on the Australian Top 40 pop chart in 1983. His lyrics to date were published in Ink Music: The Collected Lyrics of Chris Mosdell.

His popularity as a Tokyo-based English writer also led him to write for numerous Japanese television commercials, often collaborating with former Sadistic Mika Band lead vocalist and guitarist Kazuhiko Katō.

During this time he again teamed up with Yukihiro Takahashi to write songs for the albums Ego (1988) and Broadcast from Heaven (1990).

In 2003 Sarah Brightman recorded the song When Firebirds Sing, an operatic opus set in ancient Japan and included on her album Harem. The song was commissioned for the popular PlayStation 2 game Tengai Makyo III (2004). The lyrics themselves depict the tale of lovers from the Land of Curved Fire and the Sea of Desires, who are symbolised by firebirds, their wings intertwined, that circle immortally in a celestial orbit.

In 2008 Chris teamed up with long-time collaborator Kazuhiko Katō for a new glam-rock band, Vitamin Q, releasing one album 'Vitamin Q featuring ANZA'. Chris Mosdell opened the show for their debut live performance at Shibuya AX.

In 2009 Mosdell travelled to Machu Picchu and Lake Titicaca, Peru, to visit locations adjoined to his Fingerprints of the Gods installation soundtrack, and onward to Santiago, Chile to meet the German composer Uwe Schmidt (Atom™), who had covered several of Mosdell's songs on his Senor Coconut Yellow Fever! album. The meeting led to a collaboration on Schmidt and Masaki Sakamoto's album Alien Symphony (2010) with the lyricist penning the song 5.17 Minutes with Miss Eternity.

In 2010 Mosdell began working with the photographer Yuriko Takagi on an adaption of the 10th-century Japanese poetry anthology Hyakunin Isshu (One Hundred Poems by One Hundred Poets), producing a new "Shibuya version". Based on the original anthology's conversion in the 15th century into a card game, traditionally played in Japan on New Year Day's, this new bilingual photographic/verse edition selected one hundred citizens from the streets of Shibuya with Mosdell transcribing the voices of these "contemporary poets" into a modern idiom.

The song was released as a single on 21 February 2011, with the music video released on 14 June. The PV features a collection of hundreds of fan messages singing the track Chris originally wrote with the Yellow Magic Orchestra.

In 2012 he wrote Swan Song for Coppe's Rays USB and CD box set release, Cinderella City for female rock guitarist Risu's Bright-Eyed and Bushy-Tailed album, and Our Children's Rainsong for the singer/composer Akino Arai – a song especially commissioned to document the atmospheric radiation contamination after the Fukushima Daiichi nuclear disaster.

In 2014, continuing his long song writing partnership with guitarist Makoto Ayukawa of Sheena & The Rokkets, Mosdell wrote the title track to the group's latest album Rokket Ride, together with the song Rock Fox. He also worked once again with Uwe Schmidt (Atom™) to write Beethoven in Antennae, a song for Coppe's upcoming album.

To celebrate the hundredth anniversary of Igor Stravinsky's The Rite of Spring, Mosdell was commissioned to write the poetic treatment and scenario for the Kyoto International Performing Arts Festival 2014. Performed by the ensemble Enso Watt, and composed and conducted by the Yannick Paget of the Kansai City Philharmonic Orchestra, a "Rite of Summer" and "Rite of Autumn" were held in Kyoto's Urban Guild. To complete the cycle of rites, two additional performances are scheduled for 2015.

18 November 2022 ushered in the release of both Michael Jackson's anticipated Thriller 40, featuring the Mosdell co-authored demo recording of "Behind the Mask", as well as an independently produced spoken word recording in collaboration with E23, entitled Consumed By Ecstatic Cargoes.

=== Alternative lyrical landscapes ===
Mosdell words were used in alternative forms when he wrote the lyrics to Shake the Whole World to Its Foundations, a work that has evolved from a mixed Japanese-Western orchestral setting to an electronic techno version. It was eventually published in its entirety in book form in 2001 (Shichosha), together with the work of the experimental calligraphy artist Joichi Yoshikawa. Its first version, however, was written to reflect the rhythmical influence of the African continent and recorded by the West African kora player Toumani Diabate in 1992 for the album "Shake the Whole World to Its Foundations". Mosdell wrote a series of chants (eventually numbering one thousand) based on the oral poetry of the Ainu whereby, instead of having a fixed lyrical base to a song, he could dip into a pool of "chants" and select those favoured for the composition—this eventually leading to infinite lyrical variations within a fixed musical format.

Continuing this method of lyrical composition, Mosdell started the solo project, Squawk: The Song of the Violinnet, though following the financial decline of the Smokey Studios in Ginza, none of the recorded songs was ever distributed. However the effort did result in Mosdell's collaboration with the American artists Jore Park and Wylci Fables, who produced enormous "birdhead boys" depicting the characters. Using a painting technique similar to batik but on waxed Japanese washi paper, vast stained-glass-like art pieces were created—a method that would be used in Mosdell's next project. In 1988 Mosdell collaborated with the poet Shuntarō Tanikawa on a deck of 77 cards in the omikuji fortune-telling tradition of Shinto shrines. The Oracles of Distraction, are similar in style to Brian Eno's Oblique Strategies; however, rather than being instructional they are intended to distract the reader with juxtaposed images and sound. Mosdell wrote a "distractive" poem for each "oracle" in English, while Tanikawa wrote the reverse side in Japanese. Jore Park and Wylci Fables created accompanying 77 washi-painted panels. Musician Yu Imai then worked alongside other studio performers with Mosdell to create 77 audio sketches using Mosdell's VISIC compositional method. The efforts were combined into a CD box set of text, audio and visual imagery intended to be used in conjunction. Users were instructed to randomly select a numbered card to read and view, and to simultaneously play the CD track of the same number.

While Mosdell was moving to Paris and commuting to Japan, The Oracles of Distraction was presented at Laforet Museum in Harajuku, Tokyo. Sony developed a sound system enabling visitors to wear wireless headphones and walk under motion-triggered canopies that would beam random selections of audio to the headphones to accompany the text selections highlighted on towering, illuminated paintings by Park and Fables. The museum was designed like a Shinto shrine, with attendants dressed in traditional regalia, and visitors selected their own personal oracle from among 77 different entrance tickets.

=== The Ink of Tokyo ===
In 1988 Mosdell's LAA . . . The Dangerous Opera Begins was published (Soseisha)—a narrative poem in seven acts with a theatrical structure. Influenced by the Japanese poet Yoshimasu Gozo and his technique of writing whilst walking, Mosdell envisaged a spectacular prima donna, wearing huge eccentric headdresses, whose voice changed with each new outfit in which she appeared. Gozo wrote that Mosdell's work was "The Ink of Tokyo––beautiful, beautiful, this spirit, this sea."

In 1989 Writing the Riot Act in the Illiterate Hour: New and Selected Lyrics (Shichosha) was published––an edition including additional poems from five Japanese poets (Shuntarō Tanikawa, Yoshimasu Gozo, Kazuko Shiraishi, Hiromi Ito and Makoto Oka) who gave their own personal poetic interpretations of Mosdell's lyrics.

He was also commissioned to write the theme song for the Social Democratic Party of Japan for the 1990 political election, resulting in the single "One World", an ensemble piece featuring an assortment of vocalists and session musicians.

=== Anime and visual interpretations ===
In the early 1990s Mosdell began anime soundtrack collaborations with the composer Yoko Kanno. Their partnership resulted in songs for the soundtracks of Ghost in the Shell, Gundam, Cowboy Bebop, RahXephon, and Wolf's Rain. Together they also wrote "Dreams in a Pie", the credits theme for the Sega Dreamcast video game, Napple Tale: Arsia in Daydream and worked on songs ("Another Grey Day in the Big Blue World" and "Kingfisher Girl") for Maaya Sakamoto, a frequent singer for Kanno and a popular anime voice actress.

Mosdell again collaborated with the calligraphy artist Juichi Yoshikawa, producing a bilingual publication, The Erotic Odes: A Pillow Book. Erotic shunga woodcut prints were used to illuminate the 48 (the number of sexual positions in traditional Japanese society) haiku-like poems, as were new creations by Yoshikawa. Shuntarō Tanikawa, together with Rie Terada, translated the poems and the shunga themselves were selected from a collection of Tanikawa's father Tetsuzō Tanikawa. The full-color edition, originally published by Libroport in 1997, was reissued in 2008 by Seigensha. Yoshikawa and Mosdell further collaborated on the full text printing of Shake the Whole World to Its Foundations.

Continuing to write lyrics for film soundtracks, Mosdell next wrote "From the Ruins of Your Beautiful Body" for the theme song to Marc Rigaudis' adaptation of his short story, "She Was So Pretty". The film featured Nana Okumura, former Miss Universe Japan 1998, and dealt with bullying in Japanese schools.

In 2009 Japanese holographic artist Hatsune Miku released 'Hatsune Miku Orchestra,' featuring covering versions of Mosdell's songs 'La Femme Chinoise,' 'Behind The Mask' and 'Nice Age.'

=== Installation and live performance ===
In 1999 Mosdell was asked by producer Shozo Tsurumoto to convey through sound the prehistorical view set forth by Graham Hancock in his book Fingerprints of the Gods. Using the gallery setting once more, the project saw the scaled recreation of Stonehenge, Machu Picchu, and the Great Pyramid of Giza, among many other monuments, within an installation environment. It was underscored by what Art Director Kevin Hamilton coined "audio poems", sonically recreating peak events within the timeline such as an Apache Indian reading a bible and amounting to an unusual audio-only project for a lyricist. It was shown in Tokyo and Osaka, and again paired Mosdell with long-time musical collaborator Yu Imai.

In 2000 Mosdell was invited by the Institute of Tagore Studies and Research at Visva-Bharati University (Santiniketan, West Bengal) for a six-month sojourn at India's "Abode of Peace", established by Rabindranath Tagore as an experimental school for literature and dance. Mosdell performed and under the spell of the lush and colourful environment wrote a new series of poems based on the 108 names of Krishna and the tripartite mystical utterance of the Upanisads. Titled Thirty-Three Billion Songs on the Road of Reincarnations: The Santiniketan Sutra (after the number of gods in the Hindu pantheon), the work is in stark contrast to his Tokyo output, subdued and calm. The book was published by Sahitya Akademi, India's National Academy of Letters in 2008.

By the next year Mosdell relocated his secondary home from Paris to Boulder, Colorado, and began a series of spoken word performances that resulted in his being awarded the Grand Prize for Poetry at the Colorado Festival of Literature, and a distribution deal to compile his lyrical works into a new publication, Splatterhead (Emerson's Eye, 2000). Extending the format of the poetry reading to include live audio/video mixing with visual artist David Fodel and techno DJ E23, Mosdell toured various cities through 2001 with his "tongue-drum delirium" ensemble, Splatterhead & The Oblivion Brotherhood. The trio later released a techno version of "Shake The World" as a single for the politically inspired electronic music compilation Polyphonic Voices of Digital Dissent.

Returning to Tokyo, Mosdell was one of a hundred local artists invited to contribute artefacts to the Millennium Time Capsule, an event held at the Laforet Museum, Harajuku. Each artist was given a time capsule and asked to place in it representations of their work that best depicted the city of Tokyo at the turn of the 20th century. Mosdell chose his notebooks, with page after page of densely written descriptions of his Eastern odyssey, and a selection of the pens that he had used for numerous lyrical projects including a pen embossed with an alien with which he wrote his Thrills in Voidville series with, and his "nude nib"", a pen carved in the figure of a woman that he used whilst composing The Erotic Odes.

Mosdell was commissioned to script the theatrical scenario for an updated Anglo-Japanese variation of the ancient Japanese epic, Amaterasu. Titled The Sun Goddess: The Resurrection of Radiance, the masked dance drama was performed as part of the "Japan Year in Britain" celebration, at the Theatre Royal Drury Lane from 26 to 28 May 2001. In collaboration with designer/director Tomio Mohri, choreographer Cathy Marston and the City Ballet of London, taiko drummer Miyuki Ikeda, model/actress Sayako Yamaguchi, and composer Kazuhiko Katō (of Sadistic Mika Band), the play depicts the origins of music and dance. Written in blank verse with a British cast of Shakespearean actors, it employed techniques from the traditional stage of kabuki to innovative choreography, and melded into the stage setting other aspects of contemporary media.

By 2006, to coincide with the publication of City of Song, his epic depiction of characters from the twenty-three ku, or wards, of Tokyo, Mosdell had updated his spoken word performances to include a full mixed-culture ensemble, The Incendiary Orchestra. Featuring koto composer/performer, Michiyo Yagi, violinist Edgar Kautzner, tabla player Andy Matzukami, and translator Rie Terada, the live performances were held in various places around Tokyo, and were recorded on video as part of a documentary about Mosdell's artistic history, titled Ink Music: In the Land of the Hundred-Tongued Lyricist, slated for release in 2009.

2015 was the 70th year since the dropping of the atomic bombs on Hiroshima and Nagasaki, and to commemorate the tragedy Mosdell wrote and performed his poem "The Flame of the Golden Flower" at events at the Atomic Bomb Dome in Hiroshima, Chion-in Temple in Kyoto and Zojo-ji Temple in Tokyo. The event, organized by "Earth Caravan 2015", a global peace initiative, was to carry a flame, originally kindled from the atomic bomb fires, to cities touched by the horrors of war. The poem has been translated into seven languages, and was read throughout Europe on the flame's journey to its final destination of Jerusalem.

== Ink Music: The Movie ==
A film about Chris Mosdell's life, titled "Ink Music: In the Land of the Hundred-Tongued Lyricist" was released in 2009. It was produced by Denver's Brian Comerford, a volunteer producer at KGNU radio who has been running the Electronic Air show since 1995. Comerford said of the production, "He's worked with the who's who of all these major names in Japanese pop culture, from the music scene to calligraphy artists to fashion designers to stage directors to the largest broadcasting company... everyone in Japan knows his work, and yet no one there knows who he is."

The full-length film features interviews with Mosdell, Ryuichi Sakamoto, Shuntarō Tanikawa, Yukihiro Takahashi, Yoko Kanno, anime singer Maaya Sakamoto, calligraphy artist Junichi Yoshikawa and others, and debuted at the South by Southwest movie festival in Austin, Texas, in March 2009.

== Children's poetry books: Mozz ==
Under the nickname "Mozz", Mosdell has produced a series of three books under Goofy Guru Publishing, based in Boulder, Colorado. Mosdell has described the books as his "alter ego, to balance out his heavy, abstract, psychedelic and often obscure poetry." The books have been described by The Japan Times as Spike Milligan-esque.

Three books have been released so far, entirely illustrated and written by Mosdell, The Pearls of Wisdumb (2003), In Search of the Holey Whale (2008) and A Fork in the Road (2010). The three were compiled into a box set called Utter Mozzsense (2010).

All three have won awards. The Pearls of Wisdumb won an EVVY Awards for Best Humor, while A Fork in the Road was the winner of the USA Book News "Best Books 2010" Award for Humor. In Search of the Holey Whale won Gold Prize Winner of the Moonbeam Children's Book Award for Poetry.

== Selected discography ==
=== Lyricist, Yellow Magic Orchestra ===
- "Behind the Mask" (Solid State Survivor, 1979)
- "Citizens of Science" (×∞ Multiplies, 1980)
- "Insomnia" (Solid State Survivor, 1979)
- "La Femme Chinoise" (Yellow Magic Orchestra, 1978; Public Pressure, 1980; After Service, 1981)
- "Nice Age" (×∞ Multiplies, 1980)
- "Radio Junk" (Public Pressure, 1980)
- "Solid State Survivor" (Solid State Survivor, 1979)

=== Lyricist, Yukihiro Takahashi ===
- "Blue Colour Worker" (Murdered by the Music, 1980)
- "The Core of Eden" (Murdered by the Music, 1980)
- "Murdered by the Music" (Murdered by the Music, 1980)
- "Radioactivist" (Murdered by the Music, 1980)
- "School of Thought" (Murdered by the Music, 1980)
- "Drip Dry Eyes" (Neuromantic, 1981)
- "Erotic" (Ego, 1988)
- "Yes" (Ego, 1988)
- "Forever Bursting into Flame" (Broadcast From Heaven, 1990)
- "The Sensual Object Dance" (Broadcast From Heaven, 1990)
- "360 Degrees" (Broadcast From Heaven, 1990)

=== Lyricist, Ryuichi Sakamoto ===
- "Behind the Mask" (Behind the Mask, 1980)
- "War Head" (WAR HEAD, 1980), (Field Work – Ryuichi Sakamoto Collection: 1981–1987, 1987)
- "Lexington Queen" [a.k.a. "Night Boys Pick Up Some Heat"] (WAR HEAD, 1980), (The Arrangement, 1981)

=== Lyricist, Eric Clapton ===
- "Behind the Mask" (August, 1986)

=== Lyricist, Sarah Brightman ===
- "When Firebirds Cry" (Harem, 2003)

=== Lyricist, Sandii and the Sunsetz ===
- "Idol Era" (Eating Pleasure, 1980)
- "Zoot Kook" (Eating Pleasure, 1980)
- "Bongazuna" (Heat Scale, 1981)
- "The Eve of Adam" (Heat Scale, 1981)
- "Heat Scale" (Heat Scale, 1981)
- "Dreams of Immigrants" (Immigrants, 1982)
- "Sticky Music" (Sticky Music 7", 1983)
- "Drip Dry Eyes" (Viva Lava Liva, 1984)

=== Lyricist, Sheena & The Rokkets ===
- "Stiff Lips" (Sheena & The Rokkets, 1979)
- "Radio Junk" (Synkuu Pack, 1979)
- "Dead Guitar" (Channel Good, 1980)
- "Japanic" (Japanik, 2008)
- "Planet Guitar" (Japanik, 2008)

=== Lyricist, Maaya Sakamoto ===
- "The Garden of Everything" (Single Collection+ Nikopachi, 2003)
- "Another Grey Day in the Big Blue World" (Easy Listening, 2001)
- "Kingfisher Girl" (Shōnen Alice, 2003)
- "Tell Me What The Rain Knows" (Wolf's Rain OST, 2004)

=== Solo ===
- Equasian (1982 Alfa / 2003 Sony)
- The Oracles of Distraction (1988 Midi Records)
- Fingerprints of the Gods (2002 Consipio)

=== Vocalist ===
- "Citizens of Science" (YMO, Multiplies)
- "War Head" (Ryuichi Sakamoto, Solo Works)
- "Shake the World" (Splatterhead & The Oblivion Brotherhood, Polyphonic Voices of Digital Dissent)

=== Film score lyrics ===
- "Butterfly" (Cowboy Bebop: Knockin' On Heaven's Door (Future Blues), 2001)
- "Beauty Is Within Us" (Ghost in the Shell: Stand Alone Complex O.S.T., 2003)
- "Run, Wolf Warrior, Run" (Wolf's Rain, 2004)
- "Walking Through the Empty Age" (Texhnolyze: Man of Men, 2004)
- "The End of All You'll Know" (Ghost in the Shell: Stand Alone Complex O.S.T. 3, 2005)
- "Ringo Biyori: The Wolf Whistling Song" (Spice and Wolf, 2008)

== Selected publications ==
- Laugh Out Loud (Asahi Publishing, 1979)
- Ink Music: The Collected Lyrics of Chris Mosdell (Ink Music Inc., 1985)
- LAA . . . The Dangerous Opera Begins (Soseisha, 1988)
- Writing the Riot Act in the Illiterate Hour: New and Selected Lyrics with Shuntarō Tanikawa, Yoshimasu Gozo, Kazuko Shiraishi, Hiromi Ito and Makoto Oka (Shichosha, 1989)
- The Oracles of Distraction with Shuntarō Tanikawa (Seidosha, 1991)
- Shake the Whole World To Its Foundations with Juichi Yoshikawa (calligraphy), and Rie Terada (translator) (Shichosha Publishing, 2001)
- Splatterhead: The Songlines of Chris Mosdell (Emerson's Eye, 2001)
- City of Song: The Incendiary Arias (Edokko Editions, 2006)
- Thirty-Three Billion Songs on the Road of Reincarnations: The Santiniketan Sutra (Sahitya Akademi, 2008)
- The Erotic Odes: A Pillow Book with Juichi Yoshikawa (calligraphy), and Shuntarō Tanikawa and Rie Terada (translators) (Seigensha, 2008)
- The Kantocles: Songs from the Atomic Aisles (Edokko Editions 2013)
- The City That Silk Built: The Courier Collection (Shinhyoron 2014)
- The Radicals: A Nation's Ideogrammic Anthems (Edokko Editions 2019)
- Behind the Mask: One Hundred Haiku with Ryo Ohwada (photography)(Slogan 2023)

== Awards ==
- Gold Prize for Lyrics, Tokyo Music Festival, for "Wild Dreams" by Pia Zadora, 1984
- The Yuki Hayashi-Newkirk Poetry Prize, 1987
- Grand Prize for Poetry, Colorado Festival of Literature, 2000
- EVVY Children's Book Award for Humor, 2004
- Gold Prize Winner of the Moonbeam Children's Book Award for Poetry, 2008
- Winner of the USA Book News "Best Books 2010" Award for Humor
- Winner of the 2023 Japan's Classic Day Cultural Foundation Prize
