= Sandii & the Sunsetz =

Japanese band

- Origin: Japan
- Genres: Rock, synth-pop, Techno Pop, World Music
- Years active: 1981–1990
- Labels: Alfa, Toshiba EMI, Sire, Virgin
- Past members: Sandii; Makoto Kubota; Keni Inoue; Takashi Onzou; Hideo Inoura; Miki Ishida; Jimmy D.Wong; Shouji Yuasa

Sandii & the Sunsetz were a Japanese synth-pop band that collaborated from 1979 until the 1990s. The Sunsetz, led by Makoto Kubota, and Sandii started as separate artists, and each has a separate discography. However, their collaboration provided a particular body of work that is representative of the period, and which successfully blended Eastern, Western and pop influences.

== Career ==
=== Early days ===
Sandii (サンディー) - (born 鈴木 あや, Suzuki Aya, renamed in the U.S. as Sandra O'Neale, born December 27, 1952) - was born in Japan to an American father of Irish and Spanish ancestry and a Japanese mother. Her father was in the U.S. Navy, and she spent her early life in Japan, but moved to Hawaii in her early teens and began to study hula and Pacific dance. After becoming accomplished as a singer and dancer, Sandii released her first record "Perusha Neko" under the name Sandi Ai. Returning to Japan in 1975 she was befriended by Kyu Sakamoto, who helped her to get a job as a DJ on NHK TV in Japan. Sandii performed during the interval of the "World Popular Song Festival" in late 1975, and secured a record deal with Toho. Sandii's debut album, Sandi Ai, is a mix of Japanese originals and covers of well-known songs by John Lennon and Olivia Newton-John. The album was not a great success, and Sandii left Toho for Discomate Records.

Makoto Kubota (久保田麻琴, born July 11, 1949) grew up in a movie theater in Komatsu City, Ishikawa Prefecture, where a U.S. military base was located, and went on to attend Doshisha University in Kyoto. While still a student there, he made his single debut in 1970 with “Showa Genroku Hoge Hoge Bushi.” He then joined Les Rallizes Dénudés (裸のラリーズ, Hadaka no rariizu) led by Takashi Mizutani, who was a year his senior in the light music club. He went to the United States and spent seven months traveling around. Upon his return to Japan, he recorded the solo album *Machibouke*. Later, while continuing he activities with Les Rallizes Dénudés, he formed "The Sunset Gang" (夕焼け楽団, "Yuyake Gakudan").

In 1976 Sandii performed at the Yamaha World" Popular Song Festival as a non-competitor interval act, and the next year she won the prestigious “Grand Prix Best Vocal Performance” award with the single "Goodbye Morning", her best selling record to date.

Sandii met Makoto Kubota in 1976, when he was a guest on her NHK TV show and afterward joined his band The Sunset Gang as a backup singer. Makoto was an accomplished musician with broad influences, and the collaboration went on to be critically acclaimed, though never quite achieving the popular success expected. The music of The Sunset Gang was very influenced by blues, Southern and West Coast rock, but later they became increasingly interested in Hawaiian and Okinawan music. At this time Sandii also became friends with the future members of the Yellow Magic Orchestra, frequent collaborators with the Sunset Gang; Haruomi Hosono naming her "Sandii" because of the connection with Hawaii. However, until 1980 Sandii used a variety of names for different sessions e.g. "Sandra Hohn", "Sandi A. Hohn", and even "Sandy Ayako".

On the soundtrack of Lupin The Third Sandii performed the songs "I Miss You Babe" and "Love Squall"; the latter was a single release paired with the theme of the TV series by Yuji Ohno.

In 1978 Sandii sang the end title theme for the Japanese release of Agatha Christie's Death on the Nile, which became a top 20 hit in Japan. This gave Sandii and Makoto the opportunity to record a follow-up album. With limited time and budget, the album Mystery Nile consists of disco and pop cover versions including "Dancing Queen" by ABBA. Sandii and Makoto used fake English names on the record - "Sandy O'Neil" and "Theo Layer".

Other guest appearances include the albums Dead End and Monkey Magic by Godiego plus Melting Pot by Yamamoto Sho, whose backing band became Ippu-Do (including future Japan member Masami Tsuchiya).

In 1979, again using the name "Sandy O'Neil", Sandii released the disco track "Hey! King Kong", which failed to become a hit. The same year saw Sandii's first guest appearance with the Yellow Magic Orchestra on their album Solid State Survivor. Right at the end of '79 the Y.M.O. and Sandii began to record her debut for Alfa Records, Eating Pleasure, featuring lyrics by Yellow Magic Orchestra lyricist, Chris Mosdell, who, as he had done for YMO's Solid State Survivor also wrote the bulk of the lyrics for Eating Pleasure. At this point Makoto also wound up the Sunset Gang and Sandii & The Sunsetz were born. The two groups had the same members, but Sandii became lead vocalist. The collaboration with Mosdell would go on to produce some of the band's biggest hits over the next four years. Sandii and Makoto are on record as saying they were influenced by the sound and success of Blondie and later became friends with Debbie Harry and Chris Stein.

=== 1980s: The Sunsetz ===
Their first show as Sandii & The Sunsetz was opening for Yellow Magic Orchestra at Budokan in December 1980. In 1981 their next album Heat Scale, again featuring lyrics by Chris Mosdell, was released in 17 countries - most international releases adding tunes from "Eating Pleasure". From the release of "Heat Scale" until the next album release "Immigrants" (with a title song penned once more by lyricist Chris Mosdell) The Sunsetz spent a lot of time in the UK, recording with David Sylvian and Fun Boy Three producer Dave Jordan. Sounds, NME and Melody Maker gave The Sunsetz extensive coverage which gave the group a lot of credibility in Japan, leading to increased record sales. Their live act gained many fans in the international music industry following their support slot on the final Japan world tour. The Sunsetz went on to tour and play festivals with Eurythmics, INXS, Blondie and David Bowie. Their extensive touring and TV appearances in Australia in 1983 allowed them to achieve the #11 charting hit single "Sticky Music" (lyrics by Chris Mosdell). Sandii & the Sunsetz also wrote songs for pop idol Akina Nakamori, including her hit "Babylon". The group had problems with international distribution and promotion and was unable to replicate that success worldwide, but it had an avid cult following.

Steve Cropper saw Sunsetz guitarist Keni Inoue play in his distinctive plucking style (as heard on "Open Sesame") and asked to be taught the technique.

In 1985 Sandii & The Sunsetz left Alfa Records for Toshiba-EMI, whose greater financial muscle gave the group a better budget to work with. Following a collaboration with Stephen Duffy ("Something Special") the group released the rock influenced "La La La La Love", released as "Banzai Baby" outside Japan. Although a strong album musically the group was disappointed that it was not promoted internationally, despite following the guidance of the record company, and opted to follow their own creative vision for subsequent releases. This led them to reggae, dancehall and other Jamaican styles which heavily influenced the final Sunsetz albums "Rhythm Chemistry" and "One Love".

=== 1990-present: Latter days ===
In 1990, the group had another re-invention, just using the name Sandii, although they would carry on using "& The Sunsetz" for live appearances well into the 1990s. Sandii and Makoto decided to concentrate on the Asian market and subsequent releases sold in greater numbers, helped by Sandii recording key songs in up to four languages. This arrangement continued until the 1994 release of "Dreamcatcher", but it came to an end following Kubota and Sandii’s divorce. In 1996 Sandii recorded the first of her "Hawaii" albums and became increasingly involved in Hula culture. Sandii now runs two Hula schools, in Harajuku, Tokyo and Yokohama and has a TV series on NHK, contributing to the popularity of Hula dance in Japan and allowing Sandii to release roughly two albums a year of Hawaiian and other Pacific style music. In late 2005 Sandii achieved the rank of Kumu Hula and celebrated with an event at a shrine in Ise, with old friend Haruomi Hosono providing the music.

Makoto Kubota still produces music in Japan that explores new directions.

== Band Members ==
- Sandii - Vocal, Percussion
- Makoto Kubota - Vocal, Guitar, Electronic keyboard
- Kenichi "Keni" Inoue - Guitar, Vocal
- Takashi Onzou - Bass Guitar, Vocal
- Hideo Inoura - Drums (1981-1985, 1988)
- Miki Ishida - Drums (1986, “Banzai Baby”)
- Shoji Yuasa - Drums (1987, “Rhythm Chemistry.”)
- Jimmy D.Wong - Saxophone, Electronic Keyboard (1987, “Rhythm Chemistry”)

== Sandii Discography ==
=== Singles ===
- (as Sandi Ai) "Sandi Ai" (Toho Records, 1975) (included the singles "Ai No Melody" and "Kuzitsuke no yurushite")
- (as Sandi Ai) "Perusha Neko" (Pineapple Records Hawaii, USA, 1975)
- (as Sandy) "Goodbye Morning" (Discomate Records, 1976)
- (as Sandra Hohn) "Love Squall" (Vap, 1978)
- (as Sandy O'Neil) "Mystery Nile" (Toshiba-EMI, 1978)
- (as Sandy O'Neil) "Hey! King Kong" (Toshiba-EMI, 1979)
- "Drip Dry Eyes" (Alfa Records, 1980; lyrics: Chris Mosdell)
- (with Stephen Duffy) "Something Special" (Ten Records/Virgin, 1985)

=== Albums ===
- Eating Pleasure (Alfa Records, 1980; title track lyrics by Chris Mosdell)
- Mercy (1990)
- Pacifica (1992) Highest Oricon Ranking: #55.
- Airmata (1993)
- Dream Catcher (1994)
- WATASHI (1996)
- Sandii's Hawaii (1996)
- Sandii's Hawaii 2nd (1997)
- Sandii's Hawaii 3rd (1998)
- Sings Pacific Lounge Classics featuring Lune Paolo (1999)
- Ukulele Dreaming (2003)
- Sandii's Lemurian Heart (2004)
- Sandii's Hawaii 4th (2007)
- Sandii's Tahitian Passions (2007)
- Moana Nui - Sandii's Tahitian Passions 2 (2008)
- Sandii Beach (2010)
- Sandii's Hawaii 5th (2011)
- Sandii's Showa Hawaiian Ukulele Dreaming 2 (2011)
- Sandii's Hawaii 6th Sandii's Hawaii Christmas (2013)
- Sandii's Hawaii 7th Island Style (2013)
- Te Pua No 'ano' a - Sandii's Tahitian Passions 3 (2015)
- Hula Dub (2018)

=== Compilations ===
- Come Again – Remixes and Rare Tracks (Eastworld, 1991)

== Makoto Kubota Discography ==
- Machibouke (Toshiba Musical Industries/EXPRESS, 1973)
- Makoto Kubota II / Sunset Gang（TRIO/SHOWBOAT, 1974）
- On The Border（BEAMS, 2000）
- KAUAI March-05（ABY, 2005）
- Spirit of Healing-Bali（DELLA, 2005）
- Spirit of Healing-India（DELLA, 2006)
- Bali Dream（VIVID/ABY, 2008）
- Spa Asia（DELLA, 2010）
- Relax & Sleep-Bali (DELLA, 2016)

== Makoto Kubota and The Sunset Gang (Yuyake-Gakudan) ==
- Hawaii Champroo（TRIO/SHOWBOAT, 1975）
- Dixie Fever（TRIO/SHOWBOAT, 1977）
- The Lucky Old Sun（NIPPON COLUMBIA/BETTER DAYS, 1977）
- Better Days of Sunset Gang（TRIO/SHOWBOAT, 1977）BEST
- Second Line（NIPPON COLUMBIA/BETTER DAYS, 1979）
- Rhythm Romans（VIVID, 1981)
- Made in Islands（Tokuma Japan/SHOWBOAT 28JAL-3100 1987）REMIX BEST
- Made in Islands VOL.2（Tokuma Japan/SHOWBOAT, 1989）REMIX & RERECORDED BEST
- Live Sunset 64' 40"（VIVID/CHOP, 1989）
- 13 CLASSICS（VIVID/CHOP CHOP D-25 1994）BEST
- Gang Live Again（VIVID/CHOP, 2000）
- Rolling Coconut Review Japan Concert 1977（DISK UNION/SUPER FUJI, 2018)
- Live Besa & More 1975-1979 （DISK UNION/SUPER FUJI, 2022）

== Sandii & The Sunsetz discography ==
=== Singles ===
- "Sticky Music" (Alfa Records/WEA, 1983; lyrics: Chris Mosdell) - AUS #11
- "Viva Lava Vida" (1984) - AUS #45
- "Immigrants" (1984) - AUS #100
- 'Babes in the Woods" (Eastworld/Toshiba EMI, 1985)

=== Albums ===
- Heat Scale (Alfa Records, 1981; title track lyrics by Chris Mosdell)
- Immigrants (Alfa Records, 1982; title track lyrics by Chris Mosdell)
- Sticky Music (Sire Records, 1983) - AUS #11
- La La La La Love~Banzai Baby (Eastworld/Toshiba EMI, 1986)
- Rhythm Chemistry (Toshiba EMI, 1987)
- One Love (Toshiba EMI, 1988)

=== Compilations ===
- Viva Lava Liva: 1980–1983 (Alfa Records, 1984; a different version was released in Australia)
- Orientation (Best of 1985–1988) (Toshiba EMI, 1990)
- East Meets West (A&M, US/Canada, 1989; compilation of material from 1980 to 1988)
- Twins – Super Best of Sandii and Sunsetz (Alfa Records, 1996)

=== Other ===
- "The Bomb the Bass Remix" (Alfa Records,

== See also ==
- J-pop
