= Yukihiro Takahashi =

Japanese musician (1952–2023)

Yukihiro Takahashi 高橋 幸宏
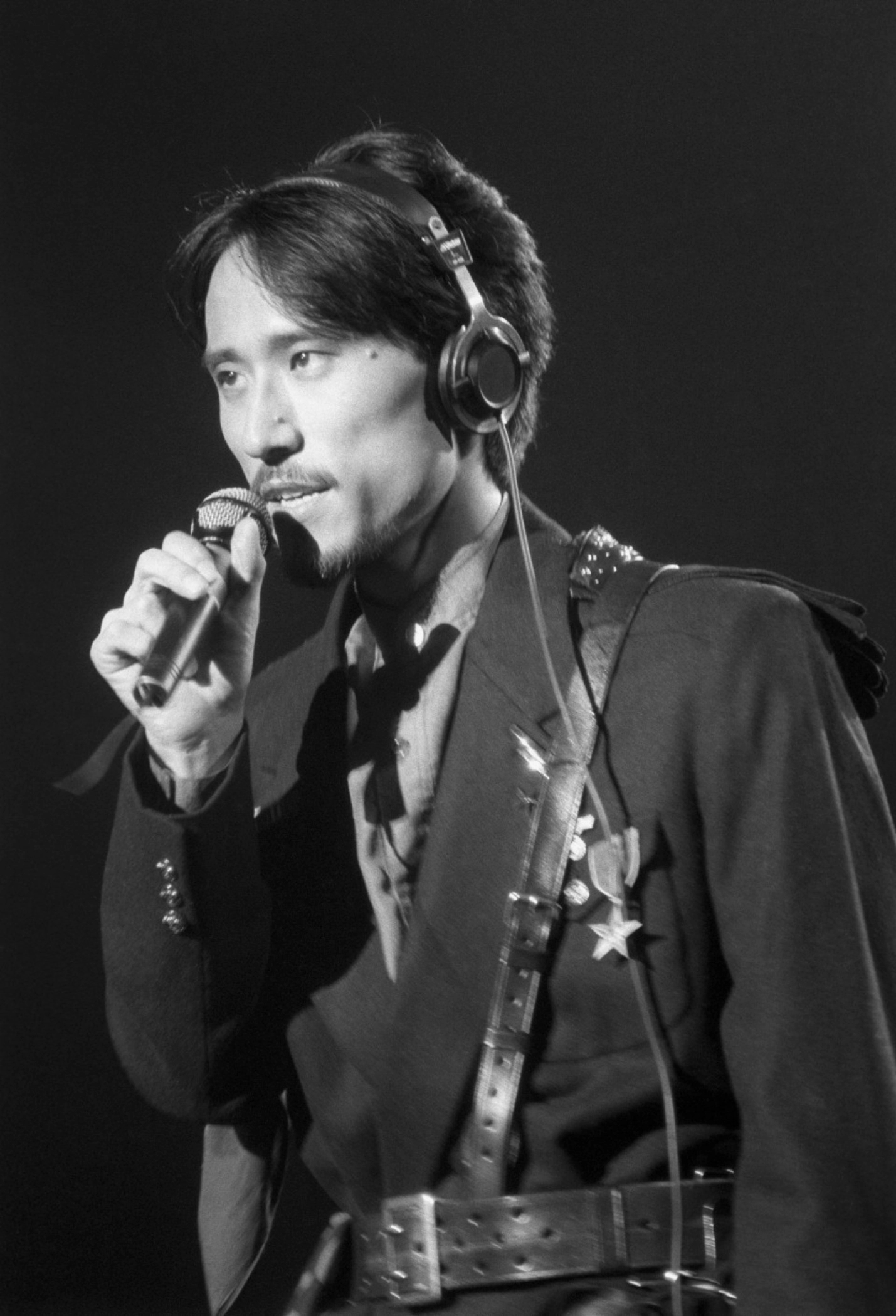
- Takahashi performing with Yellow Magic Orchestra, 1983

Background information
- Born: June 6, 1952; Tokyo, Japan
- Died: January 11, 2023 (aged 70) Karuizawa, Nagano, Japan
- Genres: Electronic; pop; rock
- Occupations: Musician; singer; record producer; actor
- Instruments: Drums; vocals
- Years active: 1972–2023
- Formerly of: Yellow Magic Orchestra; Sadistic Mika Band; Sketch Show; The Beatniks; pupa; Metafive; Tokyo Ska Paradise Orchestra
- Spouse: Kiyomi Takahashi (?–2023)

Yukihiro Takahashi (Japanese: 高橋 幸宏, Hepburn: Takahashi Yukihiro; June 6, 1952 – January 11, 2023) was a Japanese musician, singer, record producer, fashion designer, and actor, who was best known internationally as the drummer, lead vocalist, & co-composer of Yellow Magic Orchestra, as the former drummer of the Sadistic Mika Band, and as the drummer and backing vocalist of the Sadistics. He was also a member of the groups: the Beatniks (with Keiichi Suzuki), Sketch Show (with Haruomi Hosono), & Metafive (with Towa Tei etc.).

== Career ==
Takahashi began playing the drums around the fifth grade. While attending Rikkyo Junior High School, he formed a band called "Buddha's Narcissy" with his classmate Masakazu Togo (who would later debut in the folk group Buzz, produced by Takahashi's older brother). He also befriended Yumi Matsutoya (then Yumi Arai) during his junior high years. Takahashi started working as a studio musician while still in high school, and in 1969, he joined the folk band Garo as a support member. However, he and bassist Ray Ohara left the group shortly after, feeling that the band's pop direction following their hit "Gakuseigai no Kissaten" did not suit them.

While studying at the Musashino Art University Junior College of Art and Design in 1972, Takahashi dropped out to join the Sadistic Mika Band at the invitation of Kazuhiko Katō (formerly of The Folk Crusaders), replacing drummer Hiro Tsunoda. Takahashi first came to prominence as the drummer of this band, and became known to western audiences after they toured and recorded in the United Kingdom, even serving as the opening act for Roxy Music's 1975 UK tour. After the Sadistic Mika Band disbanded, some of the members (including Takahashi) formed another band called The Sadistics, who released several albums. Takahashi recorded his first solo album, Saravah, in 1977.

In 1978, Takahashi joined Ryuichi Sakamoto and Haruomi Hosono to form the Yellow Magic Orchestra (YMO). Takahashi's exceptionally tight, precise drumming with minimal notes was highly respected by his peers and heavily influenced a generation of musicians. Although Hosono initially intended for YMO to rely on guest vocalists, Sakamoto recommended Takahashi to sing on "La Femme Chinoise", revealing Takahashi's vocal talent which became a prominent feature of the band. In addition to music, Takahashi—who already worked as a designer for his own fashion brands "Bricks" and "Bricks-MONO"—designed YMO's iconic stage costumes. Throughout the 1980s, Takahashi also released a large number of solo albums primarily intended for the Japanese market. Takahashi collaborated extensively with other musicians, including Bill Nelson, Iva Davies of Icehouse, Keiichi Suzuki of the Moonriders (often as a duo dubbed "The Beatniks", although Suzuki essentially functioned as a member of Takahashi's backing band during the Moonriders' brief hiatus) and in particular Steve Jansen. Takahashi released a single Stay Close and an EP Pulse as a duo with Jansen.

Takahashi helped compose the soundtrack to the anime series Nadia: Secret of the Blue Water in 1989, including the song "Families". Takahashi participated in temporary reunions of both the Sadistic Mika Band (minus the lead vocalist Mika, who was replaced by Karen Kirishima for the 1989 reunion, and by Kaela Kimura for the 2006 reunion), and Yellow Magic Orchestra (YMO). Both of these reunions included tours of Japan and an album of new material.

In the early 2000s, Takahashi became a member of the duo Sketch Show, with Haruomi Hosono. Sketch Show released two albums, one of which, Loophole, was released in the UK. Both Takahashi and Hosono reunited with Sakamoto as HASYMO – a combination of Human Audio Sponge and Yellow Magic Orchestra. This collaboration produced a single, "Rescue", in 2007. Takahashi released the solo album Life Anew on July 17, 2013, as well as anniversary and live albums. His later work included Saravah, Saravah! (2018), a remastered reboot of his solo debut album which, along with re-recorded vocals, featured appearances by Sakamoto, Hosono and other musicians.

== Personal life ==
Takahashi was born in Tokyo. His older brother, Nobuyuki Takahashi, is a music producer and former member of The Fingers. His older sister, Mie Ito, is considered a pioneer of public relations in the Japanese fashion industry. His nephew, Soichiro Ito, is the designer of the fashion brand "soe". Takahashi was married to Emiko Takahashi from 1980 to 1992, and to Kiyomi Takahashi (formerly a non-no model) from 1993 until his death in 2023.

Outside of music, Takahashi maintained a highly active career in fashion design. Throughout his life, he was the designer for numerous brands, including Brother, Buzz Brother, Bricks, Bricks-MONO, and YUKIHIRO TAKAHASHI COLLECTION. He also produced the runway music for Yohji Yamamoto's Paris Collection shows. He maintained a close friendship with actor Naoto Takenaka and frequently appeared in surreal sketch comedy routines on Takenaka's television shows. Takahashi also briefly hosted the popular late-night radio program All Night Nippon in 1983.

Takahashi was an avid, obsessive fisherman—a hobby he originally took up as a treatment for neurosis, which eventually led him to become the president of the "Tokyo Tsurukame Fishing Club". He spent much of his later life residing in Karuizawa, Nagano, a town he frequented since childhood due to his family's villa, and incidentally the exact location where he first met Haruomi Hosono years prior.

=== Health and death ===
Takahashi suffered from headaches from the beginning of summer 2020. While Takahashi initially thought that these were migraines, he finally underwent an MRI scan. It was discovered that the headaches were the result of a brain tumor. On August 13, 2020, Takahashi underwent surgery to remove the tumor; he announced that there were no after effects and that he would devote himself to treatment. On October 20, 2020, Takahashi announced through his social media that he had completed his course of treatment following the surgery.

On January 11, 2023, Takahashi died in Karuizawa, Nagano, from aspiration pneumonia, a complication of the brain tumor. He was 70.

== Discography ==
=== Albums ===
==== Studio albums ====
Title	Album details	Peak chart positions
Title	Album details	JPN Oricon
Saravah!	Released: 21 June 1978; Label: King; Formats: LP, cassette tape, CD, digital download, streaming	-
Murdered by the Music	Released: 21 June 1980; Label: King; Formats: LP, cassette tape, CD, digital download, streaming	12
Neuromantic	Released: 24 May 1981; Label: Alfa; Formats: LP, cassette tape, CD, digital download, streaming	21
What, Me Worry?	Released: 21 June 1982; Label: Alfa; Formats: LP, cassette tape, CD, digital download, streaming	35
Tomorrow's Just Another Day	Released: 25 August 1983; Label: Alfa; Formats: LP, cassette tape, CD, digital download, streaming	11
Wild and Moody	Released: 10 November 1984; Label: Alfa; Formats: LP, cassette tape, CD, digital download, streaming	13
Once a Fool	Released: 1 November 1985; Label: Canyon; Formats: LP, cassette tape, CD, digital download, streaming	11
Only When I Laugh	Released: 21 August 1986; Label: Canyon; Formats: LP, cassette tape, CD, digital download, streaming	24
Ego	Released: 16 November 1988; Label: Toshiba EMI; Formats: LP, Cassette tape, CD, digital download, streaming	16
Broadcast from Heaven	Released: 4 April 1990; Label: Toshiba EMI; Formats: Cassette tape, CD, digital download, streaming	11
A Day in the Next Life	Released: 20 March 1991; Label: Toshiba EMI; Formats: CD, digital download, streaming	37
Life Time Happy Time	Released: 18 March 1992; Label: Toshiba EMI; Formats: CD, digital download, streaming	22
Mr YT	Released: 16 November 1994; Label: Toshiba EMI; Formats: CD, digital download, streaming	33
Fate of Gold	Released: 25 October 1995; Label: Toshiba EMI; Formats: CD, digital download, streaming	49
Portrait with No Name	Released: 13 November 1996; Label: Toshiba EMI; Formats: CD, digital download, streaming	49
A Sigh of Ghost	Released: 19 September 1997; Label: Consipio; Formats: CD, digital download, streaming	99
A Ray of Hope	Released: 18 March 1998; Label: Consipio; Formats: CD, digital download, streaming	-
The Dearest Fool	Released: 20 October 1999; Label: Consipio; Formats: CD, digital download, streaming	88
Blue Moon Blue	Released: 15 March 2006; Label: Toshiba EMI; Formats: CD, digital download, streaming	93
Page by Page	Released: 11 March 2009; Label: Emi Music Japan; Formats: CD, digital download, streaming	56
Life Anew	Released: 17 July 2013; Label: Universal Music Japan; Formats: CD, digital download, streaming	40

==== Compilation albums ====
Title	Album details	Peak chart positions
Title	Album details	JPN Oricon
The Brand New Day	Released: 28 November 1985; Label: Alfa; Formats: LP, cassette tape, CD, digital download, streaming	-
The Best Way	Released: 21 May 1993; Label: Pony Canyon; Formats: CD, digital download, streaming	-
I'm Not in Love: The Best of Yukihiro Takahashi 1988–1995	Released: 7 June 1995; Label: Toshiba EMI; Formats: CD, digital download, streaming	36
Yukihiro Takahashi Collection – Singles and More 1988–1996	Released: 25 February 1998; Label: Toshiba EMI; Formats: CD, digital download, streaming	-
Colors: Best of YT Cover Tracks Vol. 1	Released: 17 June 1999; Label: Consipio; Formats: CD, digital download, streaming	-
Colors: Best of YT Cover Tracks Vol. 2	Released: 7 July 1999; Label: Consipio; Formats: CD, digital download, streaming	-
A Dog Smiled: Yukihiro Takahashi Best Selection '97–'99	Released: 20 November 2002; Label: Consipio; Formats: CD, digital download, streaming	-
Turning the Pages of Life: The Best of Yukihiro Takahashi in Alfa Years 1981–1985	Released: 11 March 2009; Label: Sony Music Direct; Formats: CD, digital download, streaming	113
Turning the Pages of Life: The Best of Yukihiro Takahashi in Alfa Years 1988–1996	Released: 11 March 2009; Label: EMI Music Japan; Formats: CD, digital download, streaming	211
Grand Espoir	Released: 27 October 2021; Label: Sony Music Direct; Formats: CD, digital download, streaming	65
The Best of Yukihiro Takahashi (EMI Years 1988–2013)	Released: 27 October 2023; Label: Universal Music Japan; Formats: CD, digital download, streaming	37

==== Self-cover albums ====
Title	Album details	Peak chart positions
Title	Album details	JPN Oricon
Heart of Hurt	Released: 27 January 1993; Label: Toshiba EMI; Formats: CD, digital download, streaming	28
Saravah, Saravah!	Released: 21 May 2018; Label: Nippon Columbia; Formats: CD, LP, digital download, streaming	29

==== Live albums ====
Title	Album details	Peak chart positions
Title	Album details	JPN Oricon
Time and Place	Released: 27 January 1984; Label: Alfa; Formats: LP, cassette tape	13
A Night in the Next Life	Released: 27 January 1991; Label: Toshiba EMI; Formats: CD	74
Run After You	Released: 18 September 1998; Label: Consipio; Formats: CD	-
A Night in the Next Life – Perfect Premium Discs	Released: 11 March 2009; Label: EMI Music Japan; Formats: CD	300
Heart of Hurt Live 2014 – Seas of Seeds	Released: 23 August 2015; Label: Nishi Azabu; Formats: CD	-
Saravah Saravah! – Yukihiro Takahashi Live 2018	Released: 21 August 2019; Label: Nippon Columbia; Formats: CD+DVD, LP	46
It's Gonna Work Out – Live 82–83	Released: 14 September 2022; Label: Sony Music Direct; Formats: CD+BD	18
World Happiness	Released: 6 June 2025; Label: Nippon Columbia; Formats: CD, digital download, streaming	11

==== Soundtracks ====
Title	Album details	Peak chart positions
Title	Album details	JPN Oricon
Poisson d'Avril	Released: 25 April 1985; Label: Alfa; Formats: LP, cassette tape	28
La Pensee	Released: 21 May 1987; Label: Canyon; Formats: LP, cassette tape, CD	60
The Adventures of Gaku	Released: 21 May 1991; Label: Toshiba EMI; Formats: CD	-
Umi Sora Sango no Iitsutae	Released: 25 January 1992; Label: Consipio; Formats: CD	-
Ahiru no Uta ga Kikoete Kuru yo	Released: 30 August 1993; Label: Consipio; Formats: CD	-
Shizukana Ayashii Gogo ni	Released: 10 November 1996; Label: Consipio; Formats: CD	-
The Show vol.6 Yohji Yamamoto Collection Music	Released: 10 December 1996; Label: Consipio; Formats: CD	-

==== Collaboration albums ====
Title	Album details	Peak chart positions
Title	Album details	JPN Oricon
Pulse:Pulse (with Steve Jansen)	Released: 1998; Label: Medium Productions Limited; Formats: CD	-
Techno Recital (with Metafive)	Released: 2014; Label: Universal Music Japan; Formats: CD	43
Phase (with In Phase)	Released: 2014; Label: Universal Music Japan; Formats: CD	45

==== Remix albums ====
Title	Album details	Peak chart positions
Title	Album details	JPN Oricon
Fool on Earth	Released: 2000; Label: Consipio; Formats: CD	-

==== Box sets ====
Title	Album details	Peak chart positions
Title	Album details	JPN Oricon
Yukihiro Takahashi in T.E.N.T Years 1985–1987	Released: 16 March 2016; Label: Canyon; Formats: CD+DVD	39

=== Singles ===
Year	Album	Chart positions (JP)	Label
1978	"C'est Si Bon"/"La Rosa"	-	King
1980	"Murdered by the Music"	-	King
1980	"Blue Colour Worker"	-	King
1983	"Are You Receiving Me?"	91	Alfa
1983	"Maebure"	50	Alfa
1985	"Poisson D'Avril"	-	Alfa
1986	"Kyou no Sora"	-	Canyon
1988	"Look of Love"	-	Toshiba Emi
1990	"1 percent no Kankei"	50	Toshiba Emi
1990	"Xmas Day in the Next Life"	55	Toshiba Emi
1991	"Stronger Than Iron"	52	Toshiba Emi
1991	"Genki Nara Ureshiine"	88	Toshiba Emi
1992	"Sutekina Hito"	74	Toshiba Emi
1994	"Aozora"	-	Toshiba Emi
1995	"Seiippai No Hohoemi"	79	Toshiba Emi
1995	"Saenai Kimochi"	-	Toshiba Emi
1996	"Na mo nai Renai"	-	Toshiba Emi
1997	"A Touch of Fine"	-	Consipio
2013	"C'Est Si Bon"	-	Hints Music

==== Digital singles ====
Year	Single	Reference
2000	"A Dog Smiles"	
2006	"BMBATASG"	
2006	"BMBATASG/E"	
2006	"Blue Moon Blue"	
2006	"Something New - ASG Live"	
2009	"The Words"	
2009	"Out There"	
2013	"All That We Know"	

==== Collaboration singles ====
Year	Album	Chart positions (JP)	Label
1985	"Stay Close" (夏ざかりほの字組): with Steve Jansen	68	Canyon
1995	"Watermelon": with Tokyo Ska Paradise Orchestra	85	Toshiba Emi
2003	"Something": with Tsuyoshi Kawakami	-	Cutting Edge
2011	"The Burning Plain": with Towa Tei and Kiko Mizuhara	-	Mach
2013	"Radio": with Towa Tei and Tina Tamashiro	-	Universal Music Japan
2014	"Split Spirit": Metafive	-	Flying Dog

== Videography ==
=== Live video albums ===
	Release	Title	Format	Serial number	Chart
Apollon Music Industrial
1st	18 November 1983	Boys Will Be Boys	VHS	12H-1102	
1st	18 November 1983	Boys Will Be Boys	Betamax	12B-1101	
Alfa Records
2nd	21 December 1984	A Fragment	VHS	10AV-2	
2nd	21 December 1984	A Fragment	Betamax	10AT-2	
3rd	21 March 1985	Shin Ao Nen	VHS	98H-1126	
3rd	21 March 1985	Shin Ao Nen	Betamax	98B-1126	
Ppony
4th	24 November 1986	Japan Tour '86	VHS	V98M-1443	
4th	24 November 1986	Japan Tour '86	Betamax	X98-1443	
4th	24 November 1986	Japan Tour '86	LD	G88M-0157	
Toshiba Emi
5th	5 December 1990	A La Vie Prochaine	VHS	TOVF-7017	
5th	5 December 1990	A La Vie Prochaine	LD	TOMF-7017	
Universal Music Japan
6th	26 June 2013	One Fine Night: 60th Anniversary Live	BD+CD	TOXF-5776	47
6th	26 June 2013	One Fine Night: 60th Anniversary Live	DVD+CD	TOBF-5776	80

== Filmography ==
- A Y.M.O. Film Propaganda (1984)
- The Island Closest to Heaven (1984) – Katsuki Jirō
- Tokyo Melody
- April Fish (1986) – Nemoto Shōhei
- The Discarnates (1988)
- Otoko wa sore o gaman dekinai (2006) – Chief Priest
- 20th Century Boys 3: Redemption (2009) – Billy
- Norwegian Wood (2010) – Gatekeeper
- Labyrinth of Cinema (2020)

== Video games ==
- Ginga no Sannin (1987, Nintendo)
- Sangokushi: Eiketsu Tenka ni Nozomu (1991, Naxat)
- The Journey Home: Quest for the Throne (1993, Telenet Japan)
- FantaStep (1997, Jaleco)
- T kara Hajimaru Monogatari (1998, Jaleco) - Main Theme

== Publications ==
=== Books ===
Title	Author	Release	Publisher	ISBN
Iji no Chi (偉人の血)	Yukihiro Takahashi, Keiichi Suzuki	1985	Palco	ISBN 4-89194-097-2
Inu no Seikatsu (犬の生活)	Takahashi	1989	Jicc	ISBN 4-88063-550-2
Hitode no Kyuujitsu (ヒトデの休日)	Takahashi	1992	Jicc	ISBN 4-7966-0292-5
Catchy & Release (キャッチ&リリース)	Takahashi	1997	Daiei	ISBN 4-88682-616-4
Kokoro ni Hiku Ongaku, Kokoro ni kiku Ongaku Shiteki Meikyoku Guide Book (心に訊く音楽、心に効く音楽 私的名曲ガイドブック)	Takahashi	2012	Php	ISBN 978-4-569-80640-2
Minimally Invasive Surgery Manual	Takahashi	2019	Sakakibara Memorial Hospital	ISBN 978-4-924671-38-6
Love Together Yukihiro Takahashi 50th Anniversary	Takahashi	2022	Kadokawa	ISBN 978-4-04-605829-4
Takahashi Yukihiro	collective authors	2024	Kawade	ISBN 978-4-309-98066-9

=== Magazines ===
Title	Author	Release	Magazine name	ISBN
Takahashi Yukihiro Tasaina Romantist no Kiseki (高橋幸宏 多才なロマンティストの軌跡)	collective authors	2023	Music	ISBN 978-4-04-605829-4
Takahashi Yukihiro Ongakuka no Shouzou (高橋幸宏、音楽家の肖像)	collective authors	2023	Sound & Recording	ISBN 978-4-8456-3902-1

=== Other appearances ===
Title	Author	Release	Publisher	ISBN
Sound & Recording Magazine 2004 January Issue (サウンド アンド レコーディング マガジン 2004年 01月号) (includes special feature of Takahashi and Haruomi Hosono)	collective authors	2004	Sound & Recording Magazine	-
Yurika 2013 March Issue (ユリイカ 2013年10月臨時増刊号) (includes special feature of Takahashi)	collective authors	2013	Yurika	ISBN 978-4-7917-0261-9
Music Magazine 2013 August Issue (ミュージック・マガジン 2013年 8月号) (includes special feature of Takahashi)	collective authors	2013	Music Magazine	ISBN 978-4-88063-550-7
Soudanshuu Yume no Naka de Aerudeshou (対談集 夢の中で会えるでしょう) (includes interview with Takahashi)	Hiroshi Takano	2018	Mile Books	ISBN 978-4-902744-93-4
Music Magazine 2023 March Issue (ミュージック・マガジン 2023年 3月号) (includes special feature of Takahashi)	collective authors	2023	Music Magazine	4910084790338
