= The Best of Mantronix (1986–1988) =

Greatest hits album by Mantronix
- Released: 1990
- Recorded: 1985–88
- Genre: Old school hip hop; electro-funk
- Label: Ten

Mantronix chronology
The Best of Mantronix (1986–1988) (1990)	The Best of Mantronix 1985-1999 (1999)

The Best of Mantronix (1986–1988) is a compact disc and vinyl record compilation album by hip hop/electo funk group Mantronix. The album was released on the Ten record label in 1990.

Despite the title, the album features tracks exclusively from Mantronix's first two (and only) studio albums released by Sleeping Bag Records between 1985 and 1986 (1985's The Album and 1986's Music Madness).

== Track listing ==
1. "Ladies (Full Length)" (Kurtis Mantronik, MC Tee) - 6:52
2. "Electronic Energy Of..." (Mantronik) - 5:32
3. "Who Is It? (Club Mix)" (Mantronik, MC Tee) - 6:58
4. "Needle to the Groove" (Mantronik, MC Tee) - 3:39
5. "Bassline (Stretched)" (Mantronik, MC Tee) - 5:24
6. "Listen to the Bass of Get Stupid, Pt. 2" (Mantronik, MC Tee) - 4:26
7. "Scream (Remix)" (Mantronik, MC Tee) - 6:15
8. "Sing a Song (Break It Down)" (Mantronik, MC Tee) - 4:07
9. "Ladies (Revised)" (Mantronik, MC Tee) - 6:44
10. "Mantronix to the Groove (Megamix)" (Mantronik, MC Tee) - 8:50
