= The Best of Mantronix 1985–1999 =

Greatest hits album by Mantronix
- Released: March 15, 1999
- Recorded: 1985–1999
- Genres: Hip hop; electro-funk; house; R&B; new jack swing
- Length: 74:59
- Label: Virgin/EMI Records
- Producer: Kurtis Mantronik

Mantronix chronology
The Best of Mantronix (1986-1988) (1990)	The Best of Mantronix 1985–1999 (1999)	That's My Beat (2002)

Professional ratings
Review scores
Source	Rating
AllMusic	link

The Best of Mantronix 1985–1999 is a compact disc compilation album by hip hop/electro-funk group, Mantronix. The album was released by Virgin Records on March 15, 1999.

The album featured not only tracks from all five Mantronix albums, but two tracks from Kurtis Mantronik's solo album, 1999's I Sing the Body Electro.

== Track listing ==
1. "Needle to the Groove" (Kurtis Mantronik, MC Tee) - 3:38
2. "Bassline (Stretched)" (Mantronik, MC Tee) - 6:01
3. "Hardcore Hip Hop" (Mantronik, MC Tee) - 6:17
4. "Ladies (Full Length)" (Mantronik, MC Tee) - 6:43
5. "Scream (Primal Scream)" (Mantronik, MC Tee) - 6:30
6. "Who Is It? (Club Mix)" (Mantronik, MC Tee) - 6:58
7. "Get Stupid Fresh Part 1" (Mantronik, MC Tee) - 3:51
8. "Simple Simon (You Gotta Regard)" (Mantronik, MC Tee) - 4:02
9. "King of the Beats" (Mantronik, Bryce Luvah) - 5:57
10. "Got to Have Your Love" (Mantronik, Luvah) - 4:07
11. "Take Your Time (Beat Me Down Mix)" (Mantronik) - 7:11
12. "Don't Go Messin' with My Heart" (Mantronik, Angie Stone) - 5:44
13. "Mad (Bleecker St. Hip Hop Formula)" (Mantronik, T. Askins) - 4:17
14. "Push Yer Hands Up (Bleecker St. Hip Hop Formula)" (Mantronik, T. Askins) - 3.33
