= Over the Rainbow (Nocera album) =

Studio album by Nocera
- Released: 1987
- Recorded: 1986–1987; New York City
- Genre: Electronic, house, dance-pop, freestyle
- Length: 41:00
- Label: Sleeping Bag Records
- Producer: Nocera, Floyd Fisher

Singles from Over the Rainbow
- 1. "Summertime Summertime" Released: March 1986; 2. "Let's Go" Released: April 1987; 3. "Tell U So" Released: November 1987

Over the Rainbow is the debut studio album from Italian-born American dance music singer Nocera, which was released through Sleeping Bag Records in 1987. The set, co-produced and co-written by Nocera and Floyd Fisher, featured additional contributions from songwriter/producer Peitor Angell, musician/programmer/composer Fred Zarr, producer/editor/mixer Chep Nuñez and Freestyle production duo The Latin Rascals (aka Albert Cabrera and Tony Moran). Two singles from this album became top ten hits on Billboard's Dance/Disco Club Play Charts: the #2 hit "Summertime Summertime" in 1986, and "Let's Go," which peaked at #8 in 1987. Another single, "Tell U So", was released in 1987. This was the only album released by Nocera as a follow-up was shelved due to the closing of Sleeping Bag Records in 1992.

== Track listing ==
| No. | Title | Length |
|---|---|---|
| 1. | "Tell U So" | 4:36 |
| 2. | "Summertime Summertime" (Remixed by Kurtis Mantronik) | 3:22 |
| 3. | "All of My Love" | 4:20 |
| 4. | "Over the Rainbow" | 5:15 |
| 5. | "Without You" | 4:29 |
| 6. | "Let's Go" (Remixed by Little Louie Vega) | 4:10 |
| 7. | "Play the Part" | 4:48 |
| 8. | "Let It Be You" | 5:25 |
| 9. | "Never Let Go" | 4:26 |
| 10. | "Over the Rainbow (Slight Return)" | 2:15 |
| Total length: | | 41:00 |
