= How Did You Know =

2003 EP by Kurtis Mantronik

EP by Kurtis Mantronik presents Chamonix
- Released: 16 June 2003
- Length: 23:56
- Label: Southern Fried
- Producer: Kurtis Mantronik

Kurtis Mantronik chronology
TrickStyle EP (2000)	How Did You Know (2003)	Journey to Utopia (2014)

How Did You Know is an extended play (EP) by Jamaican electronic dance musician Kurtis Mantronik. The EP was released in 2003 on the Southern Fried Records label, and features British singer Mim on vocals. "How Did You Know (77 Strings)" was released as a single from the EP, reaching number 16 on the UK Singles Chart and number three in Romania. The title track peaked atop the US Billboard Dance Club Play chart in May 2004.

== Track listings ==
US 12-inch single

A1. "How Did You Know" (original vocal)
B1. "How Did You Know" (Tony Senghore remix)
B2. "How Did You Know" (radio edit)

UK CD single

1. "How Did You Know" (radio edit)
2. "How Did You Know" (original vocal)
3. "77 Strings" (original instrumental)
4. "How Did You Know" (CD-ROM video)

UK 12-inch single 1

A. "How Did You Know" (original vocal)
B. "How Did You Know" (Harry's Afro Hut Bust-a-Nut remix)

UK 12-inch single 2

A. "How Did You Know" (Tony Senghore vocal mix)
B. "How Did You Know" (77 Viva Miami instrumental mix)

European CD single

1. "How Did You Know" (radio edit)
2. "How Did You Know" (original vocal)

European maxi-CD single

1. "How Did You Know" (radio edit)
2. "How Did You Know" (original vocal)
3. "How Did You Know" (Tony Senghore vocal)
4. "77 Strings" (original instrumental)
5. "How Did You Know" (CD-ROM video)

Australian CD single

1. "How Did You Know" (radio edit)
2. "How Did You Know" (original vocal)
3. "How Did You Know" (Tony Senghore vocal)
4. "77 Strings" (original instrumental)

== Charts ==
The following chart entries are for "How Did You Know (77 Strings)" unless otherwise noted.

=== Weekly charts ===
Chart (2003–2004)	Peak position
Australia (ARIA)	35
Australian Club Chart (ARIA)	1
Australian Dance (ARIA)	3
Belgium (Ultratip Bubbling Under Flanders)	9
Belgium Dance (Ultratop Flanders)	28
Europe (Eurochart Hot 100)	60
Netherlands (Dutch Top 40)	30
Netherlands (Single Top 100)	43
Romania (Romanian Top 100)	3
Scotland Singles (OCC)	22
UK Singles (OCC)	16
UK Dance (OCC)	1
UK Indie (OCC)	4
US Dance Club Play (Billboard) "77 Strings"	3
US Dance Club Play (Billboard) "How Did You Know"	1

=== Year-end charts ===
Chart (2003)	Position
Australian Club Chart (ARIA)	44
Romania (Romanian Top 100)	52

Chart (2004)	Position
US Dance Club Play (Billboard) "How Did You Know"	49

== Release history ==
Region	Date	Format(s)	Label(s)	Ref.
United Kingdom	16 June 2003	12-inch vinyl; CD	Southern Fried	
Australia	11 August 2003	CD	Southern Fried	
