= Summertime Summertime =

1986 single by Nocera

Single by Nocera

from the album Over the Rainbow
- Released: 1986
- Genre: Freestyle
- Length: 6:00 (original)
- Label: Sleeping Bag
- Songwriters: Nocera, Floyd Fisher
- Producers: Nocera, Floyd Fisher, Kurtis Mantronik (mixes)

Nocera singles chronology
| "Summertime Summertime" (1986) | "Let's Go" (1987) |

"Summertime Summertime" is the debut single by freestyle singer Nocera, released in 1986. It is from her 1987 debut album Over the Rainbow. Nocera co-wrote and co-produced the song with Floyd Fisher.

== Background ==
"Summertime Summertime" also featured contributions from Kurtis Mantronik (who added production mixes) and Chep Nunez (edits). In 1989, the single was re-released in Europe with new mixes done by Nunez and Todd Terry, and engineered by Norty Cotto.

== Track listings ==
US 12" single

| No. | Title | Length |
|---|---|---|
| 1. | "Summertime Summertime" (club) | 6:00 |
| 2. | "Summertime Summertime" (radio) | 3:23 |
| 3. | "Summertime Summertime" (soft summer dub) | 4:00 |
| 4. | "Summertime Summertime" (hard summer dub) | 4:25 |

Germany single

| No. | Title | Length |
|---|---|---|
| 1. | "Summertime Summertime" (clubhouse mix) | 6:30 |
| 2. | "Summertime Summertime" (humid house mix) | 6:30 |
| 3. | "Summertime Summertime" (hot & sweaty dub) | 6:09 |
| 4. | "Summertime Summertime" (original radio mix) | 3:23 |
| 5. | "Summertime Summertime" (original club mix) | 6:00 |
| 6. | "Summertime Summertime" (hard summer dub) | 4:25 |
| 7. | "Summertime Summertime" (soft summer dub) | 4:00 |

== Chart performance ==
The single peaked at number 2 on Billboard's Dance/Disco Club Play chart in 1986.

| Chart (1986–87) | Peak position |
|---|---|
| U.S. Billboard Hot 100 | 84 |
| U.S. Billboard Hot Dance Club Play | 2 |
| U.S. Billboard Hot Black Singles | 47 |

== Corina version ==
"Summertime Summertime"

Single by Corina
- Released: June 24, 1997
- Genre: Freestyle; Miami bass
- Length: 3:49 (original)
- Label: So So Def, Columbia
- Songwriters: Nocera, Floyd Fisher, Corina Ayala
- Producer: Albert Cabrera

Corina singles chronology
| "Now That You're Gone" (1992) | "Summertime Summertime" (1997) | "Master and Servant" (2005) |

In 1997, Corina recorded a new version of "Summertime Summertime" for the So So Def Bass All Stars Vol. 2 compilation. The track and accompanying video featured additional Spanish lyrics that were written by Corina as well as a sampling of Nocera's original recording and Kraftwerk's "Numbers" as remixed in the video by an uncredited Lil Jon.

=== Track listing ===
US 12" single

| No. | Title | Length |
|---|---|---|
| 1. | "Summertime Summertime" (DJ edit) | 3:20 |
| 2. | "Summertime Summertime" (Spanglish) | 3:58 |
| 3. | "Summertime Summertime" (album version) | 3:49 |
| 4. | "Es Verano" (written by Corina Ayala and Luis A. Pantajos) | 3:58 |
| 5. | "Summertime Summertime" (accapella) | 3:46 |
| 6. | "Summertime Summertime" (instrumental) | 3:54 |

== Reception ==
In a 2006 interview, Nocera offered her opinion on Corina's version, which she had mixed feelings: "I have no relationship with Corina. We've never even gone out for coffee. It kind of hurt my feelings that she didn't even return my calls to go out for a drink. But, besides all of the personal stuff, there is a magic in the original song that can't be recaptured. Corina's version was fun and playful though. I'm honored that she chose my song for a remake and, also, put some extra money in my pocket!".
