= Let's Go (Nocera song) =

Single by Nocera

from the album Over the Rainbow
- Released: 1987
- Recorded: 1987
- Genre: Freestyle
- Length: 6:30 (original)
- Label: Sleeping Bag Records
- Songwriter(s): Peitor Angell
- Producer(s): Nocera; Floyd Fisher

Nocera singles chronology
"Summertime Summertime" (1986)	"Let's Go" (1987)	"Told U So" (1987)

"Let's Go" is a song written by Peitor Angell and sung by freestyle singer Nocera, who co-produced the song with Floyd Fisher and Peitor Angell and remixed by Little Louie Vega. It was released in 1987 as the second single (after 1986's "Summertime Summertime") from her debut album Over the Rainbow. The track became her second top ten hit on Billboard's Dance/Disco Club Play chart, peaking at number 8 in August 1987.

== Track listing ==
US 12" single

No.	Title	Length
1.	"Let's Go" (Club)	6:30
2.	"Let's Go" (Radio)	3:29
3.	"Let's Dub"	6:39
4.	"Let's Percapella"	4:53
5.	"Let's Go" (Bonus Beats)	5:07
