= I Sing the Body Electro =

Studio album by Kurtis Mantronik
- Released: 1998
- Recorded: 1998
- Genre: Hip hop, electronica
- Length: 46:08
- Label: Oxygen Music Works; OMW 8
- Producer: Kurtis Mantronik

Kurtis Mantronik chronology
I Sing the Body Electro (1998)	Journey to Utopia (2014)

I Sing the Body Electro is the debut solo album of former Mantronix member Kurtis Mantronik. The album was released in 1998 on the Oxygen Music Works label and featured female MC Traylude on lead vocals.

== Critical reception ==
Professional ratings
Review scores
Source	Rating
AllMusic	4.5/5 stars

Rolling Stone wrote that the album "has kinetic clatter galore: angular Kraftwerk robocops, jam-pumping Technotronic throwbacks, even a big-beat chemistry test called 'Baby, You Blow My Mind', kicking like Cream with an Aerosmith bass line."

== Track listing ==
1. "King of the Beats [Version 3.0]" (Kurtis Mantronik) – 6:44
2. "Mad" (T. Askins, Mantronik) – 4:18
3. "On the Beatbox" (Mantronik) – 3:53
4. "Push Yer Hands Up" (Askins, Mantronik) – 3:40
5. "One Time, Feel Fine" (Askins, Mantronik) – 3:51
6. "Original Electro" (Mantronik) – 3:56
7. "Seek and Destroy" (Mantronik) – 4:24
8. "Baby, You Blow My Mind" (C. Bush, A. Heermans, Mantronik) – 3:26
9. "Cow Bites Man" (Askins, Mantronik) – 3:23
10. "Bass Machine Re-Tuned" (Mantronik) – 4:29
11. "Hush" (Mantronik) – 4:00
