= That's My Beat =

Compilation album by Mantronix
- Released: 2002
- Label: Soul jazz
- Compiler: Kurtis Mantronik

Mantronix chronology
| The Best of Mantronix 1985-1999 (1999) | That's My Beat (2002) | Remixed & Rare (2004) |

That's My Beat is a compilation album by Jamaican hip hop–electro funk musician Kurtis Mantronik and features tracks selected by Mantronik and cited as influences to his work with his hip hop/electro funk group Mantronix. The album was released on the Soul Jazz Records label in 2002.

== Background ==
The compilation started with Stuart Baker, the head of Soul Jazz Records, stating he had just asked Kurtis Mantronix to compile the album in an interview published in August 2001.

== Reception ==
Professional ratings
Review scores
| Source | Rating |
|---|---|
| AllMusic | 4/5 stars |
| Pitchfork Media | 8.2/10 |
| Rolling Stone Album Guide | 4.5/5 stars |

From contemporary reviews, Andy Kellman of AllMusic gave the album a four star out of five rating, stating that Tommy Boy's phenomenal Perfect Beats series, calling it "a rather happy medium is found between scene standards [...] and less-popular but inspired choices". The review concluded that "While it's true that old jocks and younger trainspotters might groan at the availability of most of these tracks, those who are returning to this music or are finding it for the first time are in for a real good time." Mark Richardson of Pitchfork Media stated that the album "really is fun, funky and educational from start to finish" while finding that "the older rap material is the iffiest stuff here" with its "singsong Sugarhill style is difficult to listen to now as rhyming has grown increasingly sophisticated with each passing year.", specifically noting Jimmy Spicer's "Super Rhymes".

== Track listing ==
1. The Crash Crew – "High Powered Rap" (1:53)
2. Yellow Magic Orchestra – "Computer Games" (5:51)
3. Suzi Q – "Get On Up And Do It Again" (5:57)
4. Visage – "Pleasure Boys" (7:32)
5. Funky 4 Plus 1 – "That's The Joint" (9:20)
6. Machine – "There But For The Grace Of God" (5:14)
7. Yello – "Bostich" (4:33)
8. Jimmy Spicer – "Super Rhymes" (4:59)
9. Art of Noise – "Beatbox" (8:31)
10. Unlimited Touch – "I Hear Music In The Streets" (6:46)
11. Ryuichi Sakamoto – "Riot In Lagos" (5:38)
12. T La Rock – "It's Yours" (4:16)
