= Yellow Magic Orchestra =

Japanese electronic music band

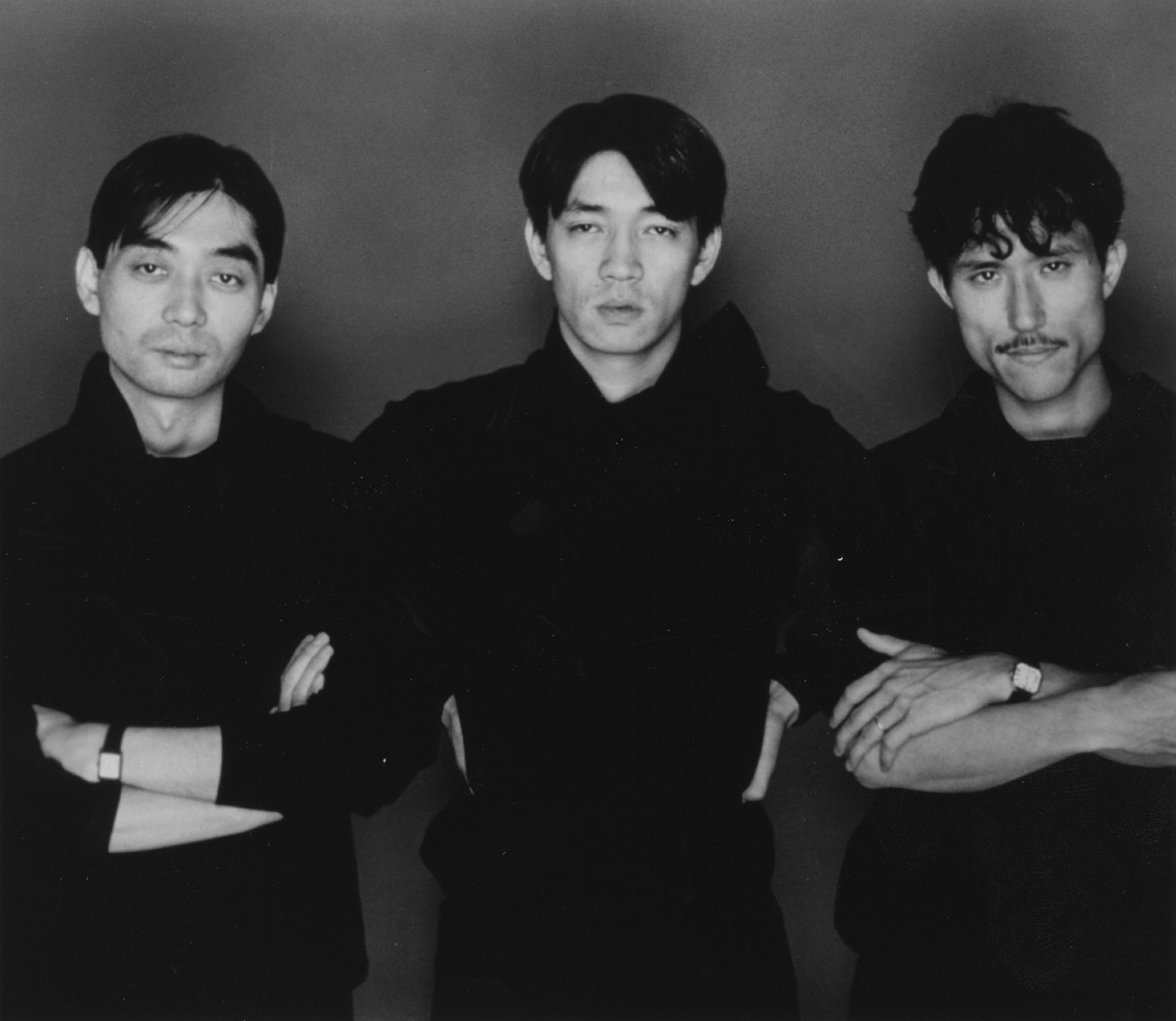
- Yellow Magic Orchestra in 1981, from left to right: Haruomi Hosono, Ryuichi Sakamoto, Yukihiro Takahashi

Background information
- Also known as: YMO; ~~YMO~~; Not YMO; Human Audio Sponge; HAS; HASYMO
- Origin: Tokyo, Japan
- Genres: Electronic; electropop; synth-pop; art pop
- Works: Yellow Magic Orchestra discography
- Years active: 1978–1984; 1992–1993; 2002–2004; 2007–2012
- Labels: Alfa Records (Japan); A&M Records; Toshiba-EMI; Restless Records; Sony Music House (Japan); Epic Records; Commmons (Japan)
- Past members: Haruomi Hosono; Ryuichi Sakamoto; Yukihiro Takahashi
- Website: ymo.org

Yellow Magic Orchestra (abbreviated as YMO) was a Japanese electronic music band formed in Tokyo in 1978 by Haruomi Hosono (bass, keyboards, vocals), Yukihiro Takahashi (drums, lead vocals, occasional keyboards) and Ryuichi Sakamoto (keyboards, vocals). The group is considered influential and innovative in the field of popular electronic music. They were pioneers in their use of synthesizers, samplers, sequencers, drum machines, computers, and digital recording technology, and effectively anticipated the "electropop boom" of the 1980s. They are credited with playing a key role in the development of several electronic genres, including synthpop, J-pop, electro, and techno, while exploring subversive sociopolitical themes throughout their career.

The three members were veterans of the music industry before coming together as YMO, and were inspired by eclectic sources, including the electronic music of Isao Tomita and Kraftwerk, Japanese traditional music, arcade games, funk music, and the disco productions of Giorgio Moroder. They released the surprise global hit "Computer Game" in 1978, reaching the UK Top 20 and selling 400,000 copies in the U.S. For their early recordings and performances, the band was often accompanied by programmer Hideki Matsutake. The group released several albums before pausing their activity in 1984. They briefly reunited several times in subsequent decades before Takahashi and Sakamoto's deaths in 2023.

== History ==
=== 1976–1978: early years and formation ===
Prior to the group's formation, Sakamoto had been experimenting with electronic music equipment at the Tokyo National University of Fine Arts and Music, which he entered in 1970, including synthesizers such as the Buchla, Moog, and ARP. The group leader Haruomi Hosono had been using an Ace Tone rhythm machine since early in his career in the early 1970s. Following the break-up of his band Happy End in 1972, Hosono became involved in the recording of several early electronic rock records, including Yōsui Inoue's folk pop rock album Kōri no Sekai (1973) and Osamu Kitajima's progressive psychedelic rock album Benzaiten (1974), both of which utilized synthesizers, electric guitars, electric bass, and in the latter, electronic drums, and rhythm machines. Also around the same time, the band's future "fourth member" Hideki Matsutake was the assistant for the internationally successful electronic musician Isao Tomita. Much of the methods and techniques developed by both Tomita and Matsutake during the early 1970s would later be employed by Yellow Magic Orchestra.

Sakamoto first worked with Hosono as a member of his live band in 1976, while Yukihiro Takahashi recruited Sakamoto to produce his debut solo recording in 1977 following the split of the Sadistic Mika Band. Hosono invited both to work on his exotica-flavoured album Paraiso, which included electronic songs produced using various electronic equipment. The band was named "Harry Hosono and the Yellow Magic Band" as a satire of the idyllic perception of pacific and Hawaiian music America had been obsessed with and in late 1977 they began recording Paraiso, which was released in 1978. The three worked together again for the 1978 album Pacific, which included an early version of the song "Cosmic Surfin".

Hosono and Sakamoto also worked together alongside Hideki Matsutake in early 1978 for Hosono's experimental "electro-exotica" fusion album Cochin Moon, which fused electronic music with Indian music, including an early "synth raga" song "Hum Ghar Sajan". The same year, Sakamoto released his own solo album, The Thousand Knives of Ryuichi Sakamoto, experimenting with a similar fusion between electronic music and traditional Japanese music in early 1978. Hosono also contributed to one of Sakamoto's songs, "Thousand Knives", in the album. Thousand Knives was also notable for its early use of the microprocessor-based Roland MC-8 Microcomposer music sequencer, with Matsutake as its music programmer for the album.

While Sakamoto was working on Thousand Knives, Hosono began formulating the idea of an instrumental disco band which could have the potential to reach success in non-Japanese-language territories, and invited Tasuo Hayashi of Tin Pan Alley and Hiroshi Sato of Huckleback as participants, but they declined. Hosono, Sakamoto and Takahashi eventually collaborated again to form the Yellow Magic Orchestra and they began recording their self-titled album at a Shibaura studio in July 1978.

=== 1978–1983: National and international success ===
The band's 1978 self-titled album Yellow Magic Orchestra was successful and the studio project grew into a fully fledged touring band and career for its three members. The album featured the use of computer technology (along with synthesizers) which, according to Billboard, allowed the group to create a new sound that was not possible until then. Following the release of the album Yellow Magic Orchestra, a live date at the Roppongi Pit Inn was seen by executives of A&M Records of the USA who were in the process of setting up a partnership deal with Alfa Records. This led to the YMO being offered an international deal, at which point (early 1979) the three members decided the group would be given priority over their solo careers. The most popular international hit from the album was "Firecracker", which would be released as a single the following year and again as "Computer Game", which became a success in the United States and Europe.

Following an advertising deal with Fuji Cassette, the group sparked a boom in the popularity of electronic pop music, called "technopop" in Japan, where they had an effect similar to that of the Beatles and Merseybeat in 1960s Britain. For some time, YMO was the most popular band in Japan. Successful solo act Akiko Yano (later married to Sakamoto) joined the band for its live performances in the late 1970s and early 1980s, but did not participate in the studio recordings. On the other hand, the YMO trio contributed to her own albums and became part of her live band, during these same years. English guitarist Bill Nelson, who had disbanded Be-Bop Deluxe and Red Noise to more recently explore electropop himself, likewise played on YMO's Naughty Boys (1983), its non-vocals variant Naughty Boys Instrumental (1984) and subsequent solo Yukihiro Takahashi projects, before featuring the latter on two of Nelson's own UK based releases.

Making abundant use of new synthesizers, samplers, sequencers, drum machines, computers and digital recording technology as it became available, as well as utilizing cyberpunk-ish lyrics sung mostly in English, they extended their popularity and influence beyond Japan.

Their second album, Solid State Survivor, released in 1979, was YMO's pinnacle recording in Japan, winning the 1980 Best Album Award in the Japan Record Awards. It featured English lyrics by Chris Mosdell, whose sci-fi themes often depicted a human condition alienated by dystopic futures, much like the emerging cyberpunk movement in fiction at that time. One of the album's major singles, and one of the band's biggest international hits, was "Behind the Mask", which YMO had first produced in 1978 for a Seiko quartz wristwatch commercial, and then for Solid State Survivor with lyrics penned by Chris Mosdell. The song was later revised by Michael Jackson, who added new lyrics and had intended to include it in his album Thriller. Despite the approval of songwriter Sakamoto and lyricist Chris Mosdell, it was eventually removed from the album due to legal issues with YMO's management. Jackson's version was never released until his first posthumous album, Michael, though his additional lyrics were included in later cover versions of the song by Greg Phillinganes, Eric Clapton, and Ryuichi Sakamoto himself in his 1986 solo release Media Bahn Live. Solid State Survivor included several early computerized synth rock songs, including a mechanized cover version of "Day Tripper" by the Beatles.

Solid State Survivor went on to sell over 2 million records worldwide. By 1980, YMO had become the most popular group in Japan, where they were performing to sold-out crowds. Their first live album Public Pressure set a record in Japan, topping the charts and selling 250,000 copies within two weeks, while their next studio album X∞Multiplies had 200,000 pre-orders before release. The same year, their albums Solid State Survivor and X∞Multiplies held the top two spots on the Oricon charts for seven consecutive weeks, making YMO the only band in Japanese chart history to achieve this feat.

The 1980 song "Multiplies" was an early experiment in electronic ska. X∞Multiplies was followed up with the 1981 album BGM. "Rap Phenomena" from the album was an early attempt at electronic rap.

They also had similar success abroad, performing to sold-out crowds during tours in the United States and Europe. The single "Computer Game" had sold 400,000 copies in the United States and reached No. 17 in the UK Charts. The group also performed "Firecracker" and "Tighten Up" live on the Soul Train television show. At around the same time, the 1980 song "Riot in Lagos" by YMO member Sakamoto pioneered the beats and sounds of electro music. The band was particularly popular with the emerging hip hop community, which appreciated the group's electronic sounds, and in the Bronx where "Firecracker" was a success and sampled in the famous Death Mix (1983) by Afrika Bambaataa. Meanwhile, in Japan, YMO remained the best-selling music act there up until 1982.

=== 1984–1993: breakup and brief reunion ===
The band had paused their group activities by 1984. After the release of their musical motion picture Propaganda, the three members had returned to their solo careers. They were careful to avoid saying they had "split up", preferring to use the Japanese phrase meaning "spreading out" (散開, sankai), and the trio continued to play on each other's recordings and made guest appearances at live shows. Takahashi, in particular, would play the band's material in his concerts. Meanwhile, Sakamoto would gain international success for his work as a solo artist, actor, and film composer, winning Grammy, Oscar, and Golden Globe awards.

Yellow Magic Orchestra released a one-off reunion album, Technodon, and credited it to 'NOT YMO' (YMO crossed out with a calligraphy X) or ~~YMO~~ in 1993. Instead of traditional vocals, about half of it features field audio recordings and samples of authors and scientists reading their work. During their brief reunion in the early 1990s, they continued to experiment with new styles of electronic music, playing an instrumental role in the techno and acid house movements of the era.

=== 2002–2023: post-breakup and reformation ===
The early 2000s saw Hosono and Takahashi reunited in a project called Sketch Show. On a number of occasions Ryuichi Sakamoto joined in on Sketch Show performances and recording sessions, later proposing the group be known as Human Audio Sponge when he participated. The group's Barcelona performance at Sonar festival and Wild Sketch Show DVDs chronicle these reunions, and include a tongue-in-cheek Japanese text-only history of the group that spans to 2036.

The band reunited in 2007 for an advertising campaign for Kirin Lager which lampooned their longevity and charted No.1 on various Japanese digital download charts (including iTunes Store chart) with the song "Rydeen 79/07", released on Sakamoto's new label commmons. As well as performing live as Human Audio Sponge, the trio performed together as Yellow Magic Orchestra for the Live Earth, Kyoto, event on July 7, 2007, which raised money and awareness of a "climate in crisis".

In August 2007, the band once again reformed, taking the name HASYMO or HAS/YMO, combining the names of Human Audio Sponge and Yellow Magic Orchestra. Their first single under this name, "Rescue", was written for the film Appleseed EX Machina. They released a new two song single titled "The City of Light/Tokyo Town Pages" on August 6, 2008. HASYMO played two live concerts in Europe in the summer of 2008, one at the Royal Festival Hall, London on June 15, as part of the Meltdown festival of music curated by Massive Attack and another in Gijón, Spain, on the 19th. Although the primary YMO members (Yukihiro Takahashi, Haruomi Hosono, and Ryuichi Sakamoto) were effectively known as HASYMO and played both these concerts, these concerts were billed simply as "YMO" but featured only 4 YMO songs in each concert while the rest of the concert featured Sketch Show, HASYMO music and members' solo works.

In August 2009, the band played the World Happiness festival in Japan, featuring many Japanese artists. The band closed the night, and confirmed that "Yellow Magic Orchestra" was their official name, dropping the HASYMO title. They opened with a cover of "Hello, Goodbye" and performed old YMO songs along with their newer songs.

In August 2010, YMO once again closed their World Happiness festival. They added classic songs from their back catalog into their set list. They also covered "Hello, Goodbye" and "Thank You (Falettinme Be Mice Elf Agin)". In January 2011, KCRW announced for their World Festival concert series that Yellow Magic Orchestra will perform at the Hollywood Bowl on June 26, 2011. Not long after, a concert for June 27, 2011, at The Warfield was added. It was announced in February that YMO would perform at the Fuji Rock festival in July and the World Happiness festival 2011 on August 7.

In 2012, Sakamoto helped organize the No Nukes 2012 festival held in the Makuhari Messe hall in Chiba, Japan, on July 7 and 8, 2012. Among the many artists performing, Kraftwerk closed the July 7 concert, with YMO performing on both days, closing the July 8 concert. YMO also headlined their World Happiness festival on August 12, 2012. After these performances, the band once again went quiet; though no formal announcement was made of a hiatus or breakup, the band ultimately did not reconvene for further recordings or headlining concerts.

On June 23, 2018, Hosono played his debut UK solo concert at the Barbican Centre in London; Takahashi and Sakamoto joined him on stage to perform "Absolute Ego Dance", marking the final time that the three would appear together in public. (The band featured in Hosono's second and third "Yellow Magic Show" on Japanese TV, both recorded in 2019; their appearance in the third was in front of a live audience, but Sakamoto appeared via prerecorded video.)

=== 2023: Takahashi and Sakamoto's deaths ===
On January 11, 2023, Takahashi died at the age of 70, following a case of pneumonia. He had undergone surgery to remove a brain tumor in 2020 but continued to have health troubles that interfered with his musical activities in the intervening years. That same year, Sakamoto died on March 28 at the age of 71, following a lengthy battle with cancer; leaving Hosono as the last surviving member of the group.

== Musical style and development ==
While their contemporaries in Düsseldorf, and later Detroit, were using synthesizer technology to create bleak dystopian music, YMO introduced a more "joyous and liberating" approach to electronic music. According to Sakamoto, they were "tired" of Japanese musicians imitating Western and American music at the time and so they wanted to "make something very original from Japan." Kraftwerk was particularly an influence on Sakamoto, who heard the band in the mid-1970s and later introduced them to his fellow band members. They were impressed with Kraftwerk's "very formalized" style but wanted to avoid imitating their "very German" approach. He described Kraftwerk's music as "theoretical, very focused, simple and minimal and strong". Their alternative template for electronic pop was less minimalistic, made more varying use of synthesizer lines, introduced "fun-loving and breezy" sounds, and placed a strong emphasis on melody in contrast to Kraftwerk's statuesque "robot pop".

The band also drew from a wider range of influences than had been employed by Kraftwerk. These influences on YMO included Japanese electronic music (such as Isao Tomita), traditional Japanese music, experimental Chinese music (of the Cultural Revolution era), Indian music (such as Ravi Shankar and Bollywood music), arcade game samples, American rap, exotica, Caribbean ska, Giorgio Moroder's disco work, the Beatles, the Beach Boys and their leader Brian Wilson, Van Dyke Parks, classical music, animal sounds, and noise. Sakamoto has expressed that his "concept when making music is that there is no border between music and noise."

=== Sampling ===
Their approach to sampling music was a precursor to the contemporary approach of constructing music by cutting fragments of sounds and looping them using computer technology. Their 1978 hit "Computer Game / Firecracker", for example, sampled Martin Denny's 1959 exotica melody "Firecracker" and arcade game sounds from Space Invaders and Circus. According to The Vinyl District magazine, they also released the first album to feature mostly samples and loops (1981's Technodelic). The pace at which the band's music evolved has been acknowledged by critics. According to SF Weekly, YMO's musical timeline has gone from "zany exotica-disco spoofs" and "bleeps and blips" in the 1970s to "sensuous musique concrète perfected" in their 1983 albums Naughty Boys and Service.

Technodelic (1981) was produced using the LMD-649, a PCM digital sampler that Toshiba-EMI sound engineer Kenji Murata custom-built for YMO. Soon after Technodelic, the LMD-649 was used by YMO-associated acts such as Chiemi Manabe and Logic System.

=== Instruments ===
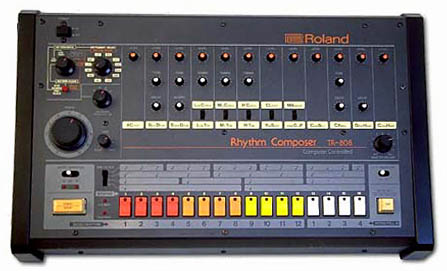
YMO were the first band to use the Roland TR-808 Rhythm Composer, which has appeared on more hit records than any other drum machine.

The band often utilized a wide variety of state-of-the-art electronic music equipment immediately as they were made available. The group leader Haruomi Hosono had already been using an Ace Tone rhythm machine since early in his career in the early 1970s. Yellow Magic Orchestra and Ryuichi Sakamoto's Thousand Knives were one of the earliest popular music albums to utilize the Roland MC-8 Microcomposer, which was programmed by Hideki Matsutake during recording sessions. Roland called the MC-8 a "computer music composer" and it was the first stand-alone microprocessor-based music sequencer. It also introduced features such as a keypad to enter note information and 16 KB of RAM which allowed a maximum sequence length of 5200 notes, a huge step forward from the 8–16 step sequencers of the era. While it was commercially unsuccessful due to its high price, the band were among the few bands at the time to utilize the MC-8, which they described as, along with its music programmer Hideki Matsutake, an "inevitable factor" in both their music production and live performances. "Behind the Mask" (1979) made use of synthesizers for the melodies and digital gated reverb for the snare drums.

They were also the very first band to utilize the Roland TR-808 Rhythm Composer, one of the first and most influential programmable drum machines, as soon as it was released in 1980. While the machine was initially unsuccessful due to its lack of digital sampling that the rival Linn LM-1 offered, the TR-808 featured various unique artificial percussion sounds, including a deep bass kick drum, "tinny handclap sounds", "the ticky snare, the tishy hi-hats (open and closed)", and "the spacey cowbell", which YMO utilized and demonstrated in their music, as early as its year of release in 1980, paving the way for the TR-808's mainstream popularity several years later, after which it would be used for more hit records than any other drum machine and continue to be widely used through to the present day.

At the time, Billboard noted that the use of such computer-based technology in conjunction with synthesizers allowed YMO to create new sounds that were not possible until then. Yellow Magic Orchestra was also the first computer-themed music album, coming before Kraftwerk's Computer World (1981) by several years. As a result of such innovations, YMO were credited at the time for having "ushered in the age of the computer programmer as rock star."

Other electronic equipment used by the group included the LMD-649 sampler (see Sampling above), Roland MC-4 Microcomposer sequencer, Pollard Syndrum electronic drums, Roland VP-330 and Korg VC-10 vocoders, Yamaha CS-80 and DX7 synthesizers, Korg PS-3100 and PS-3300 synthesizers, Moog III-C and Polymoog synthesizers, and ARP Odyssey, Oberheim Eight Voice, and E-mu Emulator synthesizers. Electric instruments were also used, the Fender Rhodes piano , Music Man Sabre Bass and Fender Jazz Bass.

=== Technical innovation and live performances ===
YMO's live performances were highly innovative for their time, particularly in their use of technology. They famously used headphones live—a rarity at the time—to listen to a click track generated by the Moog III-c to synchronize their live playing with the sequencer. Their personal monitor mixer (cue box) was custom-built just before their Greek Theatre show at great expense to facilitate this setup.

The Roland MC-8 sequencer they used was highly susceptible to heat and took a significant amount of time to load a single song's data. To cope with this, YMO strategically arranged their live setlists to alternate between sequenced and non-sequenced songs, giving their programmer Hideki Matsutake time to load the next sequence. During the first satellite broadcast from Los Angeles in 1980, Matsutake accidentally flipped switches in the wrong order for "Riot in Lagos", causing the click track to fall out of sync by a sixteenth note, an incident that visibly frustrated drummer Yukihiro Takahashi on camera.

=== Equipment by era ===
The band's equipment evolved significantly over their active periods:

- Early era (1978–1980): Hideki Matsutake's massive Moog III-c (affectionately known as the "Tansu" or Wardrobe) running on a Roland MC-8 Microcomposer formed the backbone of the group's early sound. They also utilized the Polymoog, Minimoog, Korg VC-10, Roland VP-330 (used for choir sounds on "Castalia" in addition to its vocoder functions), ARP Odyssey (used by Hosono for synth basslines), the Oberheim Eight Voice, and Korg PS-3100 (used by Hosono to generate the horse running sound effect on "Rydeen"). Takahashi augmented his acoustic drum kit with a Pollard Syndrum Quad and ULT-Sound DS-4.
- Middle era (1981): The band transitioned to programmable polyphonic synthesizers like the Sequential Circuits Prophet-5 (heavily favored by Sakamoto) and the Roland Jupiter-4, while replacing the MC-8 with the more user-friendly MC-4 Microcomposer. Matsutake upgraded his rig to the E-Mu Modular System for its metallic sound. The era also saw YMO pioneer early digital sampling and drum machines, prominently featuring the Roland TR-808 (playing a prototype live as early as 1980) and the Toshiba LMD-649 (a custom-built 12-bit PCM sampler used extensively on Technodelic).
- Late era (1982–1983): The group adopted early FM synthesis and sample-based machines, such as the Yamaha DX7 (extensively used during their 1983 Sankai final tour), the E-mu Emulator, Linn LM-1 and LM-2 drum machines, and Simmons SDS-V electronic drums.

== Legacy ==
The band has been described as "the original cyberpunks" and their early work has been described as "proto-techno" music. By the 1990s, YMO were also frequently cited as pioneers of ambient house music. YMO also popularized a style of live performance that eschewed human movement in favour of electronics such as rhythm boxes and samplers. They also influenced the New Romantic movement, including British bands Duran Duran and Japan, whose member Steve Jansen was influenced by drummer Takahashi, while lead member David Sylvian was influenced by Sakamoto, who would later collaborate with Sylvian.

Various cover versions of "Kimi ni Mune Kyun" (1983) have also been produced by other artists, including The Human League in 1993 ("YMO Versus The Human League") and Asako Toki in 2006. In 2009, a cover of "Kimi ni Mune Kyun" was used as the ending theme song for the anime adaptation of Maria Holic, sung by Asami Sanada, Marina Inoue, and Yū Kobayashi, the voice actresses of the main characters. In 2015, in the anime Sound! Euphonium, episode 5, the song "Rydeen" is played by Kitauji highschool's orchestra. The popular anime series Dragon Ball Z paid homage to the band with the song "Solid State Scouter" as the theme song of the 1990 TV special Dragon Ball Z: Bardock – The Father of Goku. The band is also referenced in the Cartoon Network series Infinity Train.

In HMV Japan's list of top 100 Japanese musicians of all time, YMO were voted second place, behind only Southern All Stars, a pop-rock band who remain largely unknown outside Japan. In 2006, Senor Coconut paid tribute to the band with his Yellow Fever! album.

=== Electronic music ===
YMO were pioneers of synthpop, a genre which emerged at the start of the 1980s. In 1993, Johnny Black of Hi-Fi News, in a review for the record Hi-Tech/No Crime, described YMO as "the most adventurous and influential electro-techno-dance technicians the world has produced" and further argued that "without them (and Kraftwerk) today's music would still sound like yesterday's music." In 2001, Jason Ankeny of the Allmusic Guide to Electronica described YMO as "a seminal influence on contemporary electronic music – hugely popular both at home and abroad" and placed them "second only to Kraftwerk as innovators of today's electronic culture."

YMO are considered pioneers in the field of popular electronic music, and continue to be remixed or sampled by modern artists, including experimental artist Yamantaka Eye, electronica group LFO, jungle band 4hero, electrolatino artist Senor Coconut, ambient house pioneers The Orb and 808 State, electronic music groups Orbital and The Human League, hip hop pioneer Afrika Bambaataa, and mainstream pop musicians such as Michael Jackson, Quincy Jones, Greg Phillinganes, Eric Clapton, Mariah Carey, and Jennifer Lopez.

YMO also influenced techno music, including its pioneers Juan Atkins, Kevin Saunderson, and Derrick May, who cited YMO as an important influence on their work alongside Kraftwerk. YMO continued to influence later techno musicians such as Surgeon, μ-Ziq, and Cosmic Baby. "Technopolis" (1979) in particular is considered an "interesting contribution" to the development of Detroit techno and the group Cybotron. "Computer Game" (1978) also influenced Sheffield's bleep techno music; the Warp record, Sweet Exorcist's "Testone" (1990), defined Sheffield's techno sound by making playful use of sampled sounds from "Computer Game" along with dialogues from the film Close Encounters of the Third Kind (1977). "Computer Game" (1978) was later included in Carl Craig's compilation album Kings of Techno (2006).

In the 1990s, YMO influenced ambient house pioneers such as The Orb and 808 State, as well as Ultramarine and other ambient/house artists. This resulted in the release of the tribute remix album Yellow Magic Orchestra: Hi-Tech/No Crime in 1993, by leading ambient, house and techno musicians at the time, including The Orb, 808 State, and Orbital. The music YMO produced during their comeback in the early 1990s also played an instrumental role in the techno and acid house movements towards the end of the 20th century. The band's use of oriental musical scales and video game sounds has continued to be an influence on 21st-century electronica acts such as Dizzee Rascal, Kieran Hebden, and Ikonika.

YMO's success with music technology encouraged many others, with their influence strongly felt in the British electronic scene of the early 1980s in particular. They influenced many early British synthpop acts, including Ultravox, John Foxx, Gary Numan, Duran Duran, Depeche Mode, Camouflage, OMD, The Human League, Visage, and Art of Noise, as well as American rock musicians such as Todd Rundgren.

"Technopolis", a tribute to Tokyo as an electronic mecca that used the term "techno" in its title, foreshadowed concepts that Juan Atkins and Rick Davis would later have with Cybotron.

=== Hip hop ===
The band was popular with the emerging hip hop community, which appreciated the group's new electronic sounds, and in the Bronx where Firecracker was a success and sampled in the famous Death Mix by Afrika Bambaataa. Afrika Bambaataa's influential song "Planet Rock" was partly inspired by YMO. The "terse videogame-funk" sounds of YMO's "Computer Game" would have a strong influence on the emerging electro and hip hop genres. Sakamoto's "Riot in Lagos" was cited by Kurtis Mantronik as a major influence on his early electro hip hop group Mantronix; he included both "Computer Game" and "Riot in Lagos" in his compilation album That's My Beat (2002) which consists of the songs that influenced his early career. The song was also later included in Playgroup's compilation album Kings of Electro (2007), alongside later electro classics such as Hashim's "Al-Nafyish" (1983). The 1980 release of "Riot in Lagos" was also listed by The Guardian in 2011 as one of the 50 key events in the history of dance music.

YMO's use of video game sounds and bleeps also had a particularly big influence on 1980s hip hop and pop music. Beyond electro acts, "Computer Game / Firecracker" was also sampled by a number of other later artists, including 2 Live Crew's "Mega-Mixx II" (1987), De La Soul's "Funky Towel" (for the 1996 film Joe's Apartment), Jennifer Lopez's "I'm Real" (2001), and the original unreleased version of Mariah Carey's "Loverboy" (2001).

=== Japan ===
The band has also been very influential in its homeland Japan, where they had become the most popular group during the late 1970s and 1980s. Their albums Solid State Survivor and X∞Multiplies held the top two spots on the Oricon charts for seven consecutive weeks in 1980, making YMO the only band in Japanese chart history to achieve this feat. Young fans of their music during this period became known as the "YMO Generation" (YMO世代, YMO Sedai).

The band significantly affected Japanese pop music, which started becoming increasingly dominated by electronic and computer music due to YMO's influence. YMO were one of the most important acts in Japan's "New Music" movement and paved the way for the emergence of contemporary J-pop in the 1980s. They also inspired early ambient techno artists such as Tetsu Inoue, and the classical music composer Joe Hisaishi. The manga author Akira Toriyama, creator of Dragon Ball and Dr. Slump, cited Yellow Magic Orchestra as his favorite music band in a 1980 interview.

The band's influence extended to a massive list of domestic musicians often referred to as the "YMO Children" generation. This included artists like Daisuke Asakura, Noriyuki Makihara, Towa Tei, and Denki Groove (whose member Takkyu Ishino was banned by his mother from listening to YMO because he played his Solid State Survivor cassette too much). During YMO's UK tour, a pre-fame Depeche Mode followed the band, constantly visiting their dressing room to ask technical questions. Modern artists like Gen Hoshino are also heavily influenced, with Hoshino calling his own genre "Yellow Music" in tribute, and performing "Firecracker" on marimba with the band on television in 2019.

=== Other media ===
Beyond music, YMO heavily influenced Japanese pop culture, comedy, and manga. Comedian Nobuyuki Hanawa of the duo Knights modeled the pacing of his stand-up comedy routine on YMO's techno tempo—specifically citing how YMO maintains a constant rhythm before dropping in a dissonant sound or sudden change, which he mirrored with rapid-fire jokes interrupted by straight-man reactions. Manga artists such as Riichi Ueshiba (Discommunication) and Hisashi Eguchi (Susume!! Pirates) frequently incorporated YMO references into their works. Eguchi actively used his manga to introduce readers to the "Technopop Big Three" (YMO, Kraftwerk, and DEVO), even drawing the YMO members as baseball commentators, while Ueshiba embedded direct homages, such as characters wearing the iconic red uniforms from YMO's 1980 From Tokio to Tokyo tour. Anime director Akiyuki Shinbo also frequently uses YMO parodies, most notably in the series Maria†Holic, where the ending theme is a direct cover of YMO's "Kimi ni, Mune Kyun" accompanied by artwork parodying the original YMO single.

=== Video games ===
YMO also influenced many video game composers and significantly affected the sounds used in much of the chiptune and video game music produced during the 8-bit and 16-bit eras. In 1994, four video game composers employed at Namco formed a parody band called Oriental Magnetic Yellow (OMY), producing parody cover versions of various YMO records, consisting of Shinji Hosoe as Haruomi Hosonoe, Nobuyoshi Sano as Ryuichi Sanomoto, Takayuki Aihara as Takayukihiro Aihara, and Hiroto Sasaki as Hideki Sasatake. Their music, specifically "RYDEEN" and "TECHNOPOLIS" were used in Forza Horizon 6.

== Members ==
=== Official members ===
- Haruomi Hosono – bass, keyboards, vocals (1978–1984; 1992–1993; 2002–2004; 2007–2012)
- Yukihiro Takahashi – lead vocals, drums, percussion, occasional keyboards (1978–1984; 1992–1993; 2002–2004; 2007–2012; died 2023)
- Ryuichi Sakamoto – keyboards, synthesizers, vocals (1978–1984; 1992–1993; 2002–2004; 2007–2012; died 2023)

=== Frequent collaborators ===
- Hideki Matsutake – synthesizers, sound programming, sequencers (1978–1982)

=== Live support members ===
- Kazumi Watanabe – guitar (early tours). His guitar tracks were completely muted on the live album Public Pressure due to label disputes with Nippon Columbia, which inadvertently solidified YMO's "synth-only" image.
- Akiko Yano – keyboards, backing vocals (1979–1980). Crucial to the first two world tours, she even acted as an interpreter for foreign media.

== Discography ==
- Yellow Magic Orchestra (1978)
- Solid State Survivor (1979)
- ×∞ Multiplies (also known as Zoshoku, 1980) (Note: Original international versions replace skits with tracks from Yellow Magic Orchestra and Solid State Survivor, depending on the region.)
- BGM (1981)
- Technodelic (1981)
- Naughty Boys (1983)
- Service (1983)
- Technodon (credited to ~~YMO~~, 1993)
