= The System Within =

2006 film directed by Dale Resteghini

- Directed by: Dale Resteghini
- Written by: Debora Heflin; Tariq Alexander
- Produced by: Tariq Alexander
- Starring: Chingy; Taimak; Kim Porter; Bryce Wilson; Tariq Alexander; Hawthorne James
- Music by: Tariq Alexander; John Fitzgerald McGill
- Production company: The System Within Film Production
- Distributed by: First Look International
- Release date: 2006
- Country: United States
- Language: English

The System Within is a 2006 film directed by Dale Resteghini and starring Chingy, Taimak, Kim Porter, Bryce Wilson, Tariq Alexander, and Hawthorne James.

== Plot ==
The film is about an internationally famous model, Tony "Wise" Good (who is played by Tariq Alexander), that fought his way out of the inner city and rocketed straight to the top. But his swift rise to the top didn't take him high enough to protect him from the sudden fall he experiences. The corrupt corporate world, the government's support and participation in that corruption, and the jealousy and greed of people he knew best, all leading to a rapid downward spiral into a living hell.

== Cast ==
- Chingy as Nick
- Bryce Wilson as Rollins
- Taimak as Pastor Ricky
- Hawthorne James as Hays
- Kim Porter as Hays Girl #2
- Tariq Alexander as Tony "Wise" Good
