= Journey to Utopia =

Studio album by Kurtis Mantronik
- Released: November 28, 2014 (CD); March 6, 2015 (Digital download)
- Recorded: 2014
- Genre: Electronica; house; acid house; trip hop
- Length: 74:59
- Label: Street DNA
- Producer: Kurtis Mantronik

Kurtis Mantronik chronology
I Sing the Body Electro (1998)	Journey to Utopia (2014)

Journey to Utopia is the second solo album by former Mantronix member Kurtis Mantronik. The album was released in 2014 on the Street DNA label

== Track listing ==
1. "Got to Have You" (Khaleel) - 5:08
2. "Need Your Love" (Khaleel) - 4:26
3. "Another Dirty Love Song" (Khaleel) - 3:56
4. "So Many Times (I Thought OK)" (Khaleel) - 4:21
5. "(Got to Be) Free (Remix)" (Khaleel) - 3:50
6. "Good Woman (Jerome Price Remix)" (Barbara Lynn) - 5:40
7. "2:00am (I'm So Fucked)" (Khaleel) - 4:25
8. "Deeper" (Khaleel) - 3:42
9. "DJ Mix" (Continuous Album Remix of Tracks 1–8) (Khaleel) - 30:29
10. "Good Woman (Tony Tokyo Mix) - 1:53 (Bonus Track, CD release only) (Lynn) - 7:20
