= Kim Porter =

American actress and model (1970–2018)

- Porter in 2018
- Born: Kimberly Antwinette Porter; December 15, 1970; Columbus, Georgia, U.S.
- Died: November 15, 2018 (aged 47); Los Angeles, California, U.S.
- Occupations: Model; actress; singer
- Years active: 1988–2018
- Children: 4, including Quincy Brown and King Combs

Kimberly Antwinette Porter (December 15, 1970 – November 15, 2018) was an American model and actress.

== Career ==
Porter was from Columbus, Georgia. She began modeling as a teenager and was also a debutante. In 1988, she graduated from Columbus High School and moved to Atlanta, Georgia, to further her modeling career. She appeared in films and TV series such as The Brothers (2001), Wicked Wicked Games (2006–2007), The System Within (2006), Single Ladies (2011), and Mama, I Want to Sing! (2012). Porter appeared in a number of music videos, and she worked as a receptionist at Uptown Records, after being hired by founder Andre Harrell.

Porter was one of the founders of Three Brown Girls, a lifestyle planning company in Atlanta, alongside college friends Nicole Cooke-Johnson and Eboni Elektra. Porter and the company helped start singer Janelle Monáe's career in the music industry, after inviting her to an open mic night and introducing her to industry contacts. Monáe said that she was "forever indebted" to Porter for believing in her.

== Personal life ==
Porter had a son, Quincy Brown (born 1991), with singer Al B. Sure! to whom she was married (according to a 2020 interview with Al B. Sure! on Fox Soul network) from 1989 until either late 1990 or 1991. From 1994 until 2007, Porter had an on-and-off relationship with rapper and record executive Sean Combs. They had one son, Christian, and twin daughters, Jessie and D'lila.

== Death ==
Porter died on November 15, 2018, in Toluca Lake, California after several days of "flu-like symptoms". Her cause of death was listed as "deferred" on her death certificate, and after an autopsy was completed on November 16, 2018, the Los Angeles County Coroner's Office confirmed on January 25, 2019, that her death was a result of lobar pneumonia. Her funeral at Cascade Hills Baptist Church in Columbus, Georgia, was attended by hundreds of mourners, including Sean Combs. Her remains were interred at Evergreen Memorial Park in Columbus, Georgia. In 2023, Combs included a tribute song to Porter on his album The Love Album: Off the Grid, entitled "Kim Porter", featuring Babyface and John Legend.

== Filmography ==
Year(s)	Title	Role	Notes
1989	"Smooth Operator"	—N/a	Music video by Big Daddy Kane; uncredited
1994	"Nuttin' but Love"	—N/a	Music video by Heavy D & the Boyz
2001	The Brothers	Sandra the Temp	Feature film
2006–2007	Wicked Wicked Games	Violet Walker	TV series; 5 episodes
2006	The System Within	Hayes' #2 Girl	Feature film
2011	Single Ladies	Jasmine	TV series; 1 episode
2011	Mama, I Want to Sing!	Tara	Feature film
