= Mim Grey =

British singer

- Born: Miriam Grey; 6 September 19?? Barnet, London, England
- Genres: Jazz; pop; folk; world; country; electronic dance
- Occupations: Singer-songwriter; musician; composer
- Instruments: Vocals; guitar
- Label: Right Track
- Website: mimgrey.com

Miriam "Mim" Grey is an English singer-songwriter. Grey has worked with London-based DJs and producers such as Lee Cabrera (2005 single/EP, "I Watch You") and Kurtis Mantronik (2003 single/EP, "How Did You Know"). Tom Jones described Grey as his "favourite singer, and author Ron McCreight called her a "highly acclaimed session musician".

In May 2010, Grey released her first solo album, Grey Matters. She has since performed with Paul McCartney and Tom Jones.

== Background ==
Grey was born in Barnet, north London, England, and left school at age 15. With much promise and the loving support of her family, she moved in with musicians John and Paul Williams, who encouraged her to follow a career in music. Grey released 'How Did You Know' with Kurtis Mantronix and maintained her jazz group with The Vodka Martinis. After Paul Williams died of pancreatic cancer, Grey formed a partnership with lyricist Cori Josias. A few years later, she met drummer and now husband Steve Vintner, who encouraged her to release her music, leading to the release of two albums, 'Grey Matters' and 'Chasing Tigers'.

== Discography ==
Studio albums

Year of release	Album title
2010	Grey Matters
2012	Chasing Tigers

Singles

Year of release	Single title	Album
2010	Purple Sky	Grey Matters
2010	Sunday Best	Grey Matters
2010	Xmas Kiss	Non-album single
2012	Mr Big Man	Chasing Tigers
