= In Full Effect =

Studio album by Mantronix
- Released: March 1988
- Genres: Hip hop, electro
- Length: 38:00
- Labels: Capitol/EMI; 0777 7 48336 2 2 C2-48336
- Producer: Kurtis Mantronik

Mantronix chronology
Music Madness (1986)	In Full Effect (1988)	This Should Move Ya (1990)

In Full Effect is the third album by the hip hop-electro funk group Mantronix, released in 1988. It was the first Mantronix album released on Capitol Records. In Full Effect was the highest charting hip-hop album for Mantronix, reaching No. 18 on the 1988 Billboard Top R&B Albums chart. The album peaked at No. 39 on the UK Albums Chart. In Full Effect was rapper MC Tee's final Mantronix album.

According to the liner notes, the album was the first-ever digital recording to be mastered from DAT rather than reel-to-reel tape.

== Critical reception ==
Professional ratings
Review scores
Source	Rating
AllMusic	3/5 stars
The Encyclopedia of Popular Music	2/5 stars
Orlando Sentinel	4/4 stars
The Rolling Stone Album Guide	3.5/5 stars

The Orlando Sentinel called the album "above average because of Mantronik's diffusion of new wave, rock, funk and hard-core hip-hop through studio technical gadgets." USA Today wrote that "wordsmith M.C. Tee and beatmeister Mantronik mix street smarts and mainstream pop sensibilities."

== Track listing ==
1. "Join Me, Please... (Homeboys—Make Some Noise)" (Mantronik, MC Tee) – 4:22
2. "Love Letter (Dear Tracy)" (Mantronik, MC Tee) – 4:27
3. "Gangster Boogie (Walk Like Sex...Talk Like Sex)" (Mantronik, MC Tee) – 3:59
4. "In Full Effect (In Full Effect)" (Mantronik, MC Tee) – 3:54
5. "Get Stupid Fresh (Part III)" (Mantronik, MC Tee) – 3:47
6. "Simple Simon (You Gotta Regard)" (Mantronik, MC Tee) – 4:03
7. "Sing a Song (Break it Down)" (Mantronik, MC Tee) – 4:08
8. "Do You Like...Mantronik (?)" (Mantronik) – 3:23
9. "Mega-Mix (’88) (Instrumental)" (Mantronik) – 4:50

== Chart positions ==
Chart (1988)	Peak position
US Top Pop Albums	108
US Top R&B Albums	18

Year	Single	Chart	Position
1988	"Simple Simon (You Gotta Regard)"	US Hot Dance Music/Club Play	19
1988	"Simple Simon (You Gotta Regard)"	US Hot Dance Music/Maxi-Singles Sales	31
