= This Should Move Ya =

Studio album by Mantronix
- Released: 1990
- Genre: Hip hop
- Label: Capitol/EMI; 0777 7 94479 2 3 C2-94479
- Producer: Kurtis Mantronik

Mantronix chronology
In Full Effect (1988)	This Should Move Ya (1990)	The Incredible Sound Machine (1991)

This Should Move Ya is the fourth album by the American musical group Mantronix, released in 1990. It was the second Mantronix album released on Capitol Records. This Should Move Ya featured new members Bryce "Luvah" Wilson and Kurtis Mantronik’s cousin D.J. D, who joined founding member Mantronik following the departure of rapper MC Tee.

"Got to Have Your Love" reached No. 4 on the British Hit Singles chart.

== Critical reception ==
Professional ratings
Review scores
Source	Rating
AllMusic	3/5 stars
Calgary Herald	D
Chicago Tribune	3/4 stars
The Rolling Stone Album Guide	2.5/5 stars

The Calgary Herald wrote that most of the album "doesn't rise about mediocre, unenlightened rap music." The Chicago Tribune determined that Luvah "has a strong enough voice to cut through the technical wizardry." The Orange County Register deemed the album "an encyclopedia of current black-music styles." The Dallas Morning News concluded that it "features plenty of the playful sound mixing that has become the hallmark of band leader Mantronik."

== Track listing ==
1. "This Should Move Ya" (Bryce Luvah)—2:55
2. "Got to Have Your Love" (featuring vocalist Wondress)(Mantronik, Bryce Luvah)—6:15
3. "Sex-n-Drugs and Rock-n-Roll" (Dury, Jankel, Mantronik, Bryce Luvah)—3:34
4. "Tonight Is Right" (Bryce Luvah)—4:07
5. "(I’m) Just Adjustin My Mic" (Bryce Luvah)—3:25
6. "Stone Cold Roach" (Bryce Luvah)—3:18
7. "Take Your Time (featuring vocalist Wondress) (Bonus Track)" (Mantronik)—4:12
8. "I Get Lifted" (Bryce Luvah)—3:32
9. "Don't You Want More" (Bryce Luvah)—3:48
10. "I Like the Way (You Do It!)" (Bryce Luvah)—4:00
11. "Get Stupid Part IV (Get On Up ’90)" (Bryce Luvah)—3:08
12. "(I'm) Just Adjustin My Mic (’90)" (Bryce Luvah)—2:50
13. "King of the Beats Lesson #1" (Bryce Luvah)—3:25
14. "Don't You Want More (Club) (Bonus Track)" (Bryce Luvah)—6:08

== Chart positions ==
Billboard Music Charts (North America)—album

Year	Chart	Peak position
1990	Top R&B/Hip-Hop Albums	61
1990	The Billboard 200	161

British Hit Singles—singles

Year	Single	Chart	Peak position
1990	"Got to Have Your Love”	British Hit Singles	4
1990	"Take Your Time" (featuring Wondress)	British Hit Singles	10

== Certifications ==
Region	Certification	Certified units/sales
United Kingdom (BPI)	Silver	60,000^{^}
^{^} Shipments figures based on certification alone.
