= Bryce Wilson =

American rapper (born 1972)

- Born: Bryce Wilson; October 7, 1972 (age 53); New York
- Origin: New York City, New York, U.S.
- Genres: Hip hop, electro
- Occupations: Producer, actor
- Instrument: Keyboard
- Years active: 1991–present
- Labels: Capitol/EMI Records (Mantronix); Epic/SME Records (Groove Theory)
- Website: www.twitter.com/bryce_wilson, www.size.net

Bryce Wilson (born October 7, 1972) is an American record producer, entrepreneur and actor. He was one half of the 1990s duo Groove Theory, and a former member of the dance/electro hip-hop group Mantronix.

== Mantronix MC and keyboardist ==
Following the departure of electro-funk/hip hop group Mantronix's original rapper MC Tee, Wilson (then known as Bryce "Luvah" or MC Luvah), and D.J. D, the cousin of the remaining Mantronix member Kurtis Mantronik, joined Mantronix for 1990's This Should Move Ya. The album spawned two top-10 hits on the UK Singles Chart, "Got to Have Your Love" at No. 4, and "Take Your Time" at No. 10. In the United States, the album reached No. 61 on the Top R&B/Hip-Hop Albums chart. Wilson was the primary rapper on all of the rap-based tracks that appeared on the album, and was responsible for the lyrical content.

Mantronix's final release, with vocalist Jade Trini replacing D.J. D, was The Incredible Sound Machine in 1991. The Incredible Sound Machine, which tended to favor new jack swing and house music over hip hop, was considered both a critical and commercial disappointment. Shortly after the tour and promotion related to the release of The Incredible Sound Machine, Mantronix disbanded.

== Groove Theory ==
Following the demise of Mantronix, Wilson paired with Amel Larrieux to form the duo Groove Theory. In 1995, the group released its self-titled debut album Groove Theory. The album featured the hit, gold certified single "Tell Me" which reached #5 on the Billboard Hot 100 and #3 on the R&B chart.

The Makeda Davis-Bryce Wilson Groove Theory line-up released one EP, 4 Shure, in 2000, which was the last recording released by the group.

== Record producer ==
In 1996, he collaborated with Babyface, and the two co-produced "You're Makin' Me High," a smash hit single for Toni Braxton that went #1 on both the R&B and Pop charts. He also appeared in the video as Toni's love interest. Wilson received a Grammy Award nomination for Best R&B Song. Wilson produced for Brandy's fifth studio album, released in 2008. Bryce has achieved two Billboard number ones as a writer in 2015, Secondcity's "I Wanna Feel", which went #1 in the UK and No. 2 on Billboard dance charts and Wale's "The Glass Egg".

== Acting ==
Since 1995, when he made a guest appearance with Groove Theory on an episode of the television drama New York Undercover, he has acted in a variety of films and television shows. He appeared as James in Beauty Shop (2005).

=== Film and television work ===
- The Game (2012)
- Milk & Honey (2012)
- Pastor Brown (as Hansan) (2009)
- Jury Of Our Peers (2008) (as Vic)
- The Stick Up Kids (2008) (as Hands)
- Show Stoppers (2008) (as Fabian)
- The System Within (2006) (as Rollins)
- Belly 2: Millionaire Boyz Club (2006) (as Amp)
- Beauty Shop (2005) (as James)
- All Shades of Fine: 25 Hottest Women of the Past 25 Years (2005)
- Hair Show (2004) (as Drake)
- Retrosexual: The 80's (2004)
- Guilty by Association (2003) (as Kenny)
- Weekend Vibe (2002)
- Trois (2000) (as Robert)
- New York Undercover... aka Uptown Undercover-Grim Reaper (1997) (with Groove Theory)
