= Got to Have Your Love =

1989 single by Mantronix

Single by Mantronix featuring Wondress

from the album This Should Move Ya
- Released: December 1989
- Genre: Hip house
- Length: 8:21 (album version); 4:10 (radio edit)
- Label: Capitol
- Songwriters: Bryce "Luvah" Wilson; Kurtis el Khaleel; Johnny D. Rodriguez
- Producer: Mantronix

Mantronix singles chronology
"Join Me Please" (1988)	"Got to Have Your Love" (1989)	"Take Your Time" (1990)

Music video
- "Got to Have Your Love" on YouTube

"Got to Have Your Love" is a song by American hip hop and electro funk group Mantronix, featuring vocals from American recording artist Wondress. It was released by Capitol Records in December 1989 as the lead single from Mantronix's fourth studio album, This Should Move Ya (1990). The song is written by band members Bryce Wilson and Kurtis Mantronik along with Johnny D. Rodriguez, and produced by Mantronix. It reached number four in the United Kingdom, number seven in Finland and number eight in Ireland. It is recognized as the group's signature song.

== Song information ==
"Got to Have Your Love" was written by Mantronix members Bryce Wilson and Kurtis Mantronik, alongside Johnny D. Rodriguez. Mantronik stated that "When I did 'Got to Have Your Love', I did it for a reason. I did it because I wanted to get a song on the radio."

== Critical reception ==
Bill Coleman from Billboard magazine wrote that the act "is back on the right track with an R&B-textured hip-hop track (à la vintage Joyce Sims) sporting a sensuous vocal performance by newcomer Wondress. Black radio needs to be on this tip as well." Dave Obee from Calgary Herald complimented the group for "find[ing] a funky groove". Push from Melody Maker felt they "returns with what is basically a half-hearted hip-house thang", calling it "slappy, slushy and slumped at the waist." Pan-European magazine Music & Media named it "attractive hip/house featuring a melodic and soulful lead vocal by Wondress. Classy stuff."

David Giles from Music Week remarked that Mantronik "appears to have stepped into Soul II Soul/Inner City domain, roping in a bluesy female vocalist and coating her in swooming strings (sampled naturally). Altogether a funker effort than those of his UK counterparts". Jack Barron from NME wrote, "Curtis has obviously been listening to Soul II Soul over there in New York and here compresses together a woman singer called Wondress (what a groovy name) and a rapper on an organic shuffle. Not instantaneous, but I've got a feeling 'Got to Have Your Love' is one of those records which will creep up on you like infatuation as opposed to some pug ugly swine with an axe in its trotter." Miranda Sawyer from Smash Hits praised it as "perfection".

== Retrospective response ==
In his retrospective review of the This Should Move Ya album, Ron Wynn from AllMusic described "Got to Have Your Love" as a "strong single". While reviewing the compilation album The Best Of: 1985-1999, Andy Crysell from NME stated that the song "remains a bewitching soul classic". In 2020, Mixmag included "Got to Have Your Love" in their list of "The Best Basslines in Dance Music", writing, "Sublime, soul-licked vocals from Wondress definitely gave it the flavour it needed for mainstream success, but it's also charged by one of the best basslines in pop history."

== Music video ==
The accompanying music video for "Got to Have Your Love" includes a cameo by former child model and now music producer Felix Howard.

== Track listing ==
1. "Got to Have Your Love" (Club with Bonus Beats) – 8:23
2. "Got to Have Your Love" (Hard to Get Rap) – 2:48
3. "Got to Have Your Love" (Luv Dub) – 6:23
4. "Got to Have Your Love" (club edit) – 5:25
5. "Got to Have Your Love" (instrumental) – 3:36
6. "Got to Have Your Love" (radio edit) – 4:12

== Charts ==
=== Weekly charts ===
Chart (1990)	Peak position
Australia (ARIA)	119
Austria (Ö3 Austria Top 40)	17
Belgium (Ultratop 50 Flanders)	19
Canada Dance/Urban (RPM)	9
Europe (Eurochart Hot 100)	9
Finland (Suomen virallinen lista)	7
Ireland (IRMA)	8
Israel (Israeli Singles Chart)	8
Italy Airplay (Music & Media)	12
Luxembourg (Radio Luxembourg)	4
Netherlands (Dutch Top 40)	14
Netherlands (Single Top 100)	15
New Zealand (Recorded Music NZ)	27
Switzerland (Schweizer Hitparade)	20
UK Singles (Official Charts)	4
UK Club Chart (Record Mirror)	1
US Billboard Hot 100	82
US 12-inch Singles Sales (Billboard)	13
US Dance Club Play (Billboard)	6
US Hot Black Singles (Billboard)	26
US Cash Box Top 100	75
West Germany (GfK)	18

=== Year-end charts ===
Chart (1990)	Position
Europe (Eurochart Hot 100)	84
UK Singles (OCC)	49
UK Club Chart (Record Mirror)	3

== Certifications ==
Region	Certification	Certified units/sales
United Kingdom (BPI)	Silver	200,000^{^}
^{^} Shipments figures based on certification alone.

== Liberty X version ==
"Got to Have Your Love"

Single by Liberty X

from the album Thinking It Over
- B-side: "Good Love"; "Get with You"; "Everything"
- Released: September 9, 2002
- Length: 3:52
- Label: V2
- Songwriters: Bryce "Luvah" Wilson; Kurtis el Khaleel; Johnny D. Rodriguez
- Producer: Rod Gammons

Liberty X singles chronology
"Just a Little" (2002)	"Got to Have Your Love" (2002)	"Holding On for You" (2002)

Music video
- "Got to Have Your Love" on YouTube

In 2002, English-Irish music group Liberty X recorded "Got to Have Your Love" for their debut studio album, Thinking It Over (2002). It was one of three tracks to be recorded for the British version of the album, as it did not feature on the original edition, To Those Who Wait. The song was released on September 9, 2002, as the fourth single from the album and reached number two on the UK Singles Chart. It also charted at number eight in Ireland and number 12 in the Netherlands.

=== Music video ===
The song's accompanying music video was filmed at Silent Waters in Montego Bay, Jamaica. It was directed by Alex Hemming and Shay Ola.

=== Track listing ===
- UK CD1
1. "Got to Have Your Love" (radio edit) – 3:52
2. "Good Love" – 3:53
3. "Get with You" – 4:00
- UK CD2
1. "Got to Have Your Love" (Jam & Faces Vamp mix) – 5:50
2. "Got to Have Your Love" (Harry's 3 Way Action mix) – 7:10
3. "Got to Have Your Love" (Shanghai Surprise mix) – 6:45
- UK 12-inch single

A1. "Got to Have Your Love" (Jam & Faces Vamp mix)
A2. "Got to Have Your Love" (Peter Parker mix)
B1. "Got to Have Your Love" (Harry's 3 Way Action mix)
B2. "Got to Have Your Love" (Shanghai Surprise mix)

- UK cassette single
1. "Got to Have Your Love" (radio edit) – 3:52
2. "Just a Little" (Radio 1 remix) – 4:08
3. "Everything" – 3:52

=== Charts ===
==== Weekly charts ====
Chart (2002)	Peak position
Australia (ARIA)	75
Belgium (Ultratip Bubbling Under Flanders)	4
Europe (Eurochart Hot 100)	14
Ireland (IRMA)	8
Netherlands (Dutch Top 40)	12
Netherlands (Single Top 100)	21
New Zealand (Recorded Music NZ)	39
Scottish Singles Sales (Official Charts)	5
UK Singles (Official Charts)	2
UK Indie (Official Charts)	1

==== Year-end charts ====
Chart (2002)	Position
UK Singles (OCC)	90

=== Release history ===
Region	Date	Format(s)	Label(s)	Ref.
United Kingdom	September 9, 2002	CD; cassette	V2	
United Kingdom	September 16, 2002	12-inch vinyl	V2	
Australia	November 25, 2002	CD	V2	
