= AirBlade =

2001 video game

- North American cover art
- Developer: Criterion Games
- Publishers: EU: Sony Computer Entertainment; NA: Namco Hometek
- Engine: RenderWare
- Platform: PlayStation 2
- Release: EU: 9 November 2001; NA: 29 January 2002
- Genre: Sports
- Modes: Single-player, multiplayer

AirBlade (stylized as airblade) is a sports video game developed by Criterion Games and published by Sony Computer Entertainment for the PlayStation 2. It is the spiritual successor to the Dreamcast game TrickStyle. Namco Hometek released the game in North America.

== Gameplay ==
The gameplay is very similar to the early Tony Hawk's video games. Players have a limited time to complete all the challenges in a level (such as knocking out a number of henchmen or destroying searchlights), with small amounts of extra time awarded for each success. There is also an emphasis on tricks and combos, which fill up a Boost gauge allowing Ethan to move faster and jump higher.

Upon completing a level, the player is awarded a rank based on the time taken to complete the level, how many trick points were earned, the largest successive combo and the number of falls. These ranks range from A-D (D being the lowest rank possible to still pass the level), with an additional 'S' rank for extremely good performance. Any rank is sufficient to continue to the next level, but high ranks are needed to unlock certain playable characters.

=== Modes ===
Along with the single-player game, there is a multiplayer mode, similar to the first games in the Tony Hawk or Dave Mirra series. Such modes were Score Attack and Party Score Attack modes. One additional mode unlike the other trick based simulators was Ribbon Tag. In Ribbon Tag, two players start on opposite ends of a map and must race to the center to obtain a small piece of caution tape. Once either player has the tape, the other player without the tape must recapture the tape. Holding the tape adds to your score every few seconds. The longer the tape is held though, the longer it gets. Players must employ what they have learned of the levels and skills learned in reaching higher ground to keep away from each other.

== Story ==
Oscar had just perfected his prototype for a hoverboard called the AirBlade when the GCP Corporation decided to shut down the project due to its energy source that would make traditional fossil fuel obsolete. A frustrated Oscar smuggled his invention home, but was tracked down and kidnapped by his former boss. His roommate and keen skater Ethan finds the AirBlade hidden in the apartment, and decides to use it with the help of his hacker friend Kat to get Oscar back while on the run from the GCP Corporation who wants to destroy the AirBlade to keep their investors and profits for traditional energy sources.

== Reception ==
Reception

Aggregate scores
Aggregator	Score
GameRankings	73.12%
Metacritic	70/100

Review scores
Publication	Score
1Up.com	C+
Eurogamer	6/10
GameSpot	7.7/10
IGN	7.7/10
Jeuxvideo.com	15/20

AirBlade received mixed reviews from critics. It received a score of 73.12% on GameRankings and 70/100 on Metacritic.

Reviewers praised the tight controls and impressive graphics, with IGN claiming that the game was "a brilliant advertisement for the RenderWare graphics engine".

However, 1UP.com and GameSpot both criticized the game's difficulty, mainly caused by the linearity of the challenges - if one task has not been achieved when the time runs out, the player is forced to restart the level and try them all again.
