= Nocera (singer) =

- Born: Lulu Nocera; March 28, 1967 (age 59); Sicily, Italy
- Genres: Freestyle, house, trip hop
- Occupations: Singer, songwriter, producer
- Instruments: Guitar, keyboards
- Years active: 1986–present
- Labels: Sleeping Bag Records (1986–1992); Hidden Tiger Music (2000)

Lulu Nocera (born March 28, 1967), known professionally as Nocera is an Italian-American club DJ and a trip hop, pop and freestyle singer. She is probably best known for her 1986 freestyle hits "Summertime Summertime" and "Let's Go".

== Early life ==
Born in Sicily, Nocera was raised in Parma, Emilia-Romagna (in northern Italy), before emigrating to the United States when she was 18 years old.

== Career ==
=== Early years ===
Nocera signed with independent label Sleeping Bag Records in 1986, and released the single "Summertime Summertime" that same year. The single, produced by Floyd Fisher and remixed by Kurtis Mantronik, was included on Nocera's 1987 debut album, Over the Rainbow, and reached No. 2 on Billboard's Hot Dance/Club Play chart in 1986. The album also featured "Let's Go", a track remixed by Little Louie Vega, and written by Peitor Angell. It reached No. 8 on the Hot Dance/Club Play chart in 1987.

Following the release, tour, and promotion of Over the Rainbow, Nocera began work on a second album, but the album was not completed or released due to the closure of Sleeping Bag Records in 1991.

=== Voice of the Satellites and DJ career ===
Following the demise of Sleeping Bag Records, Nocera sang background vocals for freestyle acts Sa-Fire, India and Information Society in the early to mid-1990s. She also toured both nationally and internationally with Information Society, providing background vocals and keyboards.

In 2000, Nocera formed the trip hop group Voice of the Satellites with guitarist Gregg Fine and keyboardist John Roggie. The band's sound has been described as "a loose, trippy blend of hip hop, acid jazz, and points in-between and elsewhere." The band has released a couple of EPs, but has yet to be signed to a major label.

Nocera is also currently a club DJ based in New York City, and toured the United States with the 'Freestyle Explosion' concert series in 2006, where she favorably reprised her mid-1980s hits from Over the Rainbow.

Nocera currently fronts a band called the BB Batts.
