= Master Mixes =

EP by Duran Duran
- Released: 20 June 1987
- Recorded: 1985–1986
- Genres: Dance; new wave
- Label: Masterdisk
- Producers: Duran Duran; Nile Rodgers

Duran Duran chronology
Notorious (1986)	Master Mixes (1987)	Big Thing (1988)

Master Mixes is a remix EP by the English pop rock band Duran Duran. This double 12" compilation was released commercially in the United States by Capitol under the production label of Masterdisk Corporation and in Brazil by EMI in 1987.

== Track listing ==
=== 2x12": Masterdisk / VB-15320-1/2 (US) ===
1. "American Science" (Chemical Reaction Mix) – 7:51
2. "Vertigo (Do The Demolition)" (Mantronix Mix) – 6:35
3. "Skin Trade" (Parisian Mix) – 8:10
4. "American Science" (Meltdown Dub) – 7:33
5. "Vertigo (Do the Demolition)" (B-Boy Mix) – 6:07
6. "Notoriousaurus Rex" (Master Mix) – 8:15

=== 12": EMI / 064 748956 1 (Brazil) ===
1. "Meet El Presidente" – 7:12
2. "American Science" (Chemical Reaction Mix) – 7:51
3. "Skin Trade" (Parisian Mix) – 8:10
4. "Vertigo (Do the Demolition)" (Mantronix Mix) – 6:35
5. "Notorious" (Latin Rascals Mix) – 6:21
6. "Notoriousaurus Rex" (Master Mix) – 8:15

== Remixers ==
=== Justin Strauss & Murray Elias ===
1. "American Science" (Chemical Reaction Mix) – 7:51
2. "American Science" (Meltdown Dub) – 7:33

=== Kurtis Mantronik ===
1. "Vertigo (Do the Demolition)" (Mantronix Mix) – 6:35
2. "Vertigo (Do the Demolition)" (B-Boy Mix) – 6:07

=== Daniel Abraham ===
1. "Skin Trade" (Parisian Mix) – 8:10

=== The Latin Rascals ===
1. "Notorious" (Latin Rascals Mix) – 6:21

=== Mark S. Berry ===
1. "Meet El Presidente" – 7:18

== Notes ==
In 1999, EMI released a collection of remixes under the title Strange Behaviour and included the "American Science (Chemical Reaction Mix)", giving the mix its first truly commercial release. The other remix of "American Science" and the Kurtis Mantronik mixes of "Vertigo" have yet to receive a commercial release, just as the "Notoriousaurus Rex (Master Mix)".
