= Hawthorne James =

American character actor and director

- Born: James Hawthorne; Chicago, Illinois, U.S.
- Education: University of Michigan
- Occupations: Actor, director
- Years active: 1979–present

Hawthorne James is an American character actor and director, known for his role as Big Red Davis in the 1991 film The Five Heartbeats.

He is also known for his role as Sam, the injured bus driver, in Speed, George, the Night Guard at the Library, in Seven and series as NYPD Blue and guest-starring on Frasier as Bill in the season one episode "Miracle on Third or Fourth Street".

He was born James Hawthorne in Chicago, Illinois, the son of Robert Hawthorne and A. M. Alene. He earned a bachelor's degree in Theater from the University of Notre Dame, a master's degree from the University of Michigan, and taught Theater at Illinois State University.

James was responsible for his appearance in the funeral scene of Jimmy Potter in The Five Heartbeats, which he based on a scene from Shakespeare's Richard III.

== Selected filmography ==
- 1979 Disco Godfather as Ray 'Stinger Ray'
- 1982 Penitentiary II as 1st Referee
- 1985 The Color Purple as Jook Joint Patron
- 1988 Patty Hearst as Tall Muslim
- 1988 I'm Gonna Git You Sucka as Sam 'One Eyed Sam'
- 1989 Ricky 1 as 'Silver Shadow', The Champ
- 1989 Othello as Iago
- 1991 The Doors as Chuck Vincent
- 1991 The Five Heartbeats as 'Big Red'
- 1992 Prophet Nat as Runaway Slave
- 1993 Frasier (TV series) as Bill
- 1994 Caroline at Midnight as Stan Donovan
- 1994 Speed as Sam
- 1994 Martin (TV series) as Brother Claus
- 1995 Seven as George, The Night Guard at the Library
- 1996 Heaven's Prisoners as Victor Romero
- 1997 Campfire Tales as Cole (segment "The Honeymoon")
- 1997 Amistad as Creole Cook
- 1998 NYPD Blue (TV series) as Calvin Chester
- 1999 The Art of a Bullet as Walter Simmons
- 2000 Auggie Rose as MacDougall
- 2004 ER as Hawthorne
- 2005 Boss'n Up as 'Orange Juice'
- 2006 Hood of Horror as Liore
- 2006 Stargate SG-1 (TV series) as Gavos
- 2006 The System Within as Hays
- 2013 A Christmas Wedding as Arthur
- 2015 Lucky Girl as Reverend Thompson
- 2016 The Night Stalker as Harrison Johnson
- 2016 Blues for Life as 'Plank Road Slim'
