= Wondress Hutchinson =

American musician (1964–2021)

Wondress Hutchinson (June 20, 1964 – May 1, 2021), known mononymously as Wondress, was an American electronic dance music and jazz fusion singer who worked with the old school hip hop/electro funk group Mantronix. Hutchinson sang lead vocals on Mantronix UK Top 10 hits, "Got to Have Your Love" and "Take Your Time" (taken from the 1990 album This Should Move Ya).

== Career ==
In 1995, Hutchinson sang background vocals for jazz fusion group, Spyro Gyra (1995 album Love and Other Obsessions).

In 2001 and again in 2003, Hutchinson sang lead and background for Baltimore-based house music artist DJ Spen (Solid Ground EP (2001)), and gospel music/house music group, Jasper Street Co. (Interpretations (The Remix Collection) (2003)).
