= Oxygen Music Works =

Anglo-American independent record label

- Founded: 1991
- Founder: Andy Shih
- Country of origin: Anglo-American

Oxygen Music Works, or OMW, was an Anglo-American independent record label. Founded in 1991 by Andy Shih, its initial, occasional releases (all vinyl) focused on the sounds of the then-thriving New York underground house music scene. By the time of its last release in 2001, the label's roster had expanded to include hip hop and electronic dance music. Its releases were widely licensed, including video games, film, and TV. OMW releases were distributed world-wide via a network of independents, and in the US by K-Tel Records. The label's best known artists include Small Fish with Spine (a.k.a. Neotropic), Kurtis Mantronik, Elements of Life, Mateo & Matos, Ultramagnetic MCs, Binger the Voyager, and Daniel Wang. A digital selection of OMW releases are available from emusic.

The label's motto was "a song for everything and everything for a song".

== See also ==
- List of record labels

== links ==
- Discogs.com Profile - Oxygen Music Works
- Allmusic.com - I Sing the Body Electro (OMW)
