= Music Madness =

Studio album by Mantronix
- Released: May 1986
- Genre: Hip hop, electro-funk
- Label: Sleeping Bag
- Producer: Kurtis Mantronik

Mantronix chronology
The Album (1985)	Music Madness (1986)	In Full Effect (1988)

Music Madness is the second album by old school hip hop and electro funk group Mantronix. Music Madness was the final Mantronix album released on the independent Sleeping Bag Records label. The hip hop album features club-oriented production by Kurtis Mantronik and MC Tee's b-boy-based rhymes.

== Critical reception ==
Professional ratings
Review scores
Source	Rating
AllMusic	4.5/5 stars
The Rolling Stone Album Guide	3/5 stars

In a contemporary review for The Village Voice, music critic Robert Christgau gave the album a B minus and found Kurtis Mantronik's beats to be full of "groove, variety, and (damn right) human touch", but facetiously pitied M.C. Tee for needing "boasting lessons." NME, said, "It isn't quite as radical a set as many were expecting, sounding a bit too similar to their first LP without the benefit of any obvious potential singles."

In a retrospective review, AllMusic's Alex Henderson viewed it as both Mantronix's second best album behind The Album and "proof of how fresh-sounding and creative Mantronix was in the beginning."

== Track listing ==
1. "Who Is It?" (MC Tee, Mantronik) – 6:05
2. "We Control the Dice" (MC Tee, Mantronik) – 3:53
3. "Listen to the Bass of Get Stupid Fresh Part 2" (MC Tee, Mantronik) – 4:22
4. "Ladies UK Remix" (MC Tee, Mantronik) – 3:35
5. "Big Band B-Boy" (MC Tee, Mantronik) – 4:40
6. "Music Madness" (MC Tee, Mantronik) – 5:23
7. "Electronic Energy Of..." (MC Tee, Mantronik) – 5:29
8. "Scream" (MC Tee, Mantronik) – 5:23
9. "Mega Mix" (MC Tee, Mantronik) – 4:00

=== Bonus tracks ===
In 1987, Sleeping Bag Records released the album on compact disc with the name Music Madness Plus, which included five bonus tracks from The Album.

1. "Bassline" (MC Tee, Mantronik) – 5:23
2. "Needle to the Groove" (MC Tee, Mantronik) – 3:40
3. "Hardcore Hip-Hop" (MC Tee, Mantronik) – 6:20
4. "Get Stupid 'Fresh' Pt. 1" (MC Tee, Mantronik) – 3:53
5. "Fresh Is the Word" (MC Tee, Mantronik) – 5:28

== Charts ==
Billboard Music Charts (North America) - album

Year	Chart	Chart position
1987	Top R&B/Hip-Hop Albums	#27

Billboard (North America) - singles

Year	Single	Chart	Chart position
1987	"Who Is It?"	Hot Dance Music/Club Play	#21
1987	"Who Is It?"	Hot R&B/Hip-Hop Singles & Tracks	#68
