= Jade Trini Goring =

- Also known as: Jade Trini
- Born: November 6, 1969 (age 56)
- Origin: Queens, New York, U.S.
- Genres: R&B; EDM; house; gospel
- Instrument: Singer
- Years active: 1991–present
- Labels: Capitol (Mantronix), Couffe Music

Jade Trini Goring (born November 6, 1969), formerly known by the stage name Jade Trini, is an American singer. Goring was also briefly a member of the electronic/house/old school hip hop group Mantronix in 1991.

== Early years ==
Goring was born in Queens, New York. She attended Julia Richman High School in Manhattan. After high school, she furthered her studies at the University of Massachusetts Amherst.

== Secular music career ==
Following her graduation from college, Goring returned to New York and pursued a professional career in acting, singing, and dancing. She landed roles in musicals such as Dreamgirls and The Wiz.

While on the road travelling with a touring company of The Wiz, Goring was asked by Mantronix group member Bryce Wilson, to consider being the lead vocalist for the Capitol Records recording group. Goring agreed, and joined the group as lead singer on the 1991 album The Incredible Sound Machine.

The Incredible Sound Machine was a further departure from Mantronix's original, heavily synthesized old school hip hop sound, and relied instead on Goring's vocals on the majority of the album's new jack swing, R&B, and house music influenced tracks.

Shortly after The Incredible Sound Machine's release and eight-week European promotional tour ended, Mantronix broke up.

Goring later worked and toured as a background singer with rapper Monie Love on her 1991 Monie Love Tour. Goring also had the opportunity to work with house music producer David Morales and R&B singer/songwriter Angie Stone during this period.

== Gospel music career ==
Goring became a born again Christian in August 1992. She has served as an event coordinator and a member of Christ Alive Christian Center in the Bronx, New York.

Goring released her debut contemporary gospel album, The Devil Lost Another One, on the independent Couffe Music label in 2003.

Goring resides in Ridgefield, Connecticut.
