= TrickStyle =

1999 video game

- Developer: Criterion Games
- Publisher: Acclaim Entertainment
- Platforms: Dreamcast, Microsoft Windows
- Release: Dreamcast: NA: 9 September 1999; EU: 14 October 1999; Windows: NA: 27 October 1999; PAL: October 1999
- Genre: Racing
- Modes: Single-player, multiplayer

TrickStyle (stylized as trICkStyLE) is a futuristic racing video game developed by Criterion Games and published by Acclaim Entertainment for the Dreamcast and Microsoft Windows. Set in the future, the player takes part in stunt-filled hoverboard races through London, Tokyo, and Manhattan, or inside a massive arena called the Velodrome. AirBlade by Criterion and Namco is a spiritual successor. The game received mixed reviews from critics, who praised its graphics and physics, but criticized its gameplay, animations and sound.

== Gameplay ==
The game initially allows the player to choose a racer and places them in the Velodrome. From there, they can enter different rooms to decide their next challenge. The player can either challenge the Velodrome trainer to unlock new tricks, or race to unlock new areas and hoverboards. For the challenges, the player must pass through a series of gates before time expires. For racing, the player progresses through tracks on 3 continents, the US, UK, and Japan. Once all five races on each continent are complete, the player unlocks a "boss race" which unlocks a new hoverboard. There are 18 tracks in the game, with 4 of them being backward versions of existing tracks.

During races, the player can perform skateboard and snowboard-like tricks, like grinding on a rail, or spinning in midair, in order to get additional points. If playing a "bully" character, they can also collide with other racers to slow them down, or if not, must avoid being hit by AI racers. A VMU game called TrickStyle Jr. was included with the title, and plays in a similar manner to Snake.

== Development and marketing ==
TrickStyle's soundtrack was composed by hip-hop producer Kurtis Mantronik. The game was successfully ported to PS2 in 2000, a demo of which was shown at GDC, but it was ultimately never released on the system.

The game was re-released by its current owners, Throwback Entertainment, on GOG.com on December 29, 2015, and on Steam on February 21, 2017.

In France, TrickStyle was promoted through a print advertising campaign featuring Italian pornographic actor Rocco Siffredi. The advertisement depicted Siffredi posing nude, with the game's box covering his groin, alongside the slogan "S'envoyer en l'air, c'est surtout une question de style" ("Getting high is above all a question of style"). The slogan was a double entendre referring both to Siffredi's profession and to the aerial stunts performed on hoverboards in the game.

== Reception ==
Reception

Aggregate score
Aggregator	Score	
Aggregator	Dreamcast	PC
GameRankings	71%	64%

Review scores
Publication	Score	
Publication	Dreamcast	PC
AllGame	3.5/5	3.5/5
CNET Gamecenter	7/10	4/10
Computer Games Strategy Plus	N/A	2.5/5
Electronic Gaming Monthly	6.625/10 (Note: In Electronic Gaming Monthly's review of the Dreamcast version, one critic gave it 8/10, another gave it 6.5/10, and the rest gave it each a score of 6/10.)	N/A
Eurogamer	N/A	6/10
Game Informer	7.75/10	N/A
GameFan	78% (Note: In GameFan's viewpoint of the Dreamcast version, three critics gave it each a score of 70, 88, and 76.) (T.R.) 70%	N/A
GameRevolution	C−	N/A
GameSpot	6.4/10	6.2/10
GameSpy	7/10	63%
IGN	8.8/10	8.5/10
Next Generation	2/5	N/A
PC Accelerator	N/A	7/10
PC Gamer (UK)	N/A	53%

TrickStyle received mixed reviews on both platforms according to the review aggregation website GameRankings.

Jeffery Adam Young of NextGen called the Dreamcast version "an impressive game to watch, and an infuriating game to play. Track design is sadistic, and AI players are inhumanly adept. Good mostly for increasing your stress level." Brandon Justice of IGN said that the same console version "sports the best art direction I've ever seen in a console racer", and compared the game to Wipeout, although saying it lacked the sense of speed to surpass that series. While calling the game's lack of extras a "letdown", he states that he had a "great time" with the game and that it would "go a long way towards opening your eyes to the possibilities of racing on the Dreamcast." Tal Blevins of the same site praised the PC version's "stunning visuals and incredibly fluid gameplay", but called the soundtrack repetitive and stated that he quickly turned off the music. He also stated that the game was "screaming for" an option to play online against other players rather than just local multiplayer.

Ben Stahl of GameSpot said the Dreamcast version was "too easy to beat", and called the sound effects annoying while praising the music. He praised the "accurate" hoverboard physics, but called the character animations "inhuman". Calling it "perfect-for-a-rental", he nevertheless stated that the graphics were the only thing "great" about the title. Edge gave the same console version eight out of ten, saying: "Regardless of such quibbles [...] it remains a key PAL release, offering a refreshing slant on the racing genre." Geoff Richards of Eurogamer criticized the PC version as a "direct port" with a "too-easy" difficulty, but calling its visuals "stunning".

In one review, Four-Eyed Dragon of GamePro called the Dreamcast version "an instant classic. Skateboarders will enjoy doing mad stunts, and the slick courses and quick boards will mesmerize race fans. Urban surfing has never been better!" (Note: GamePro gave the Dreamcast version two 5/5 scores for graphics and fun factor, 4.5/5 for sound, and 4/5 for control in one review.) In another review, Scary Larry called the same console version "a good-looking fun game with a lot of attitude and some intense game play. It's a great addition to the Dreamcast library." (Note: GamePro gave the Dreamcast version two 4.5/5 scores for graphics and control, 4/5 for sound, and 5/5 for fun factor in another review.) Nash Werner, however, said that the PC version "feels like a badly converted console racing game rushed to the PC. Its appeal will last you a week at best. I'd ask Santa for something else this year!" (Note: GamePro gave the PC version 4.5/5 for graphics, two 3/5 scores for sound and control, and 2.5/5 for fun factor.)

J.C. Herz of The New York Times called TrickStyle the only racing game on Dreamcast that "inspires hardware lust", calling its hoverboard physics "dreamy" and its visuals "razor sharp and achingly hip". In a 2009 retrospective, Eurogamer called the game a cult classic, saying that the game was "overlooked" in favor of Tony Hawk's Pro Skater.
