= The Album (Mantronix album) =

Studio album by Mantronix
- Released: 1985
- Studio: New York City, New York
- Genre: Electro, hip-hop
- Length: 35:53
- Label: Sleeping Bag
- Producer: Mantronik, MC Tee

Mantronix chronology
The Album (1985)	Music Madness (1986)

Alternative Cover
- 2008 Expanded Edition

The Album is the debut album by the group Mantronix. The group was a New York-based duo composed of MC Tee and Kurtis Mantronik. Following some live performances together, they recorded a demo tape version of the song "Fresh is the Word" which was noticed by Will Socolov of Sleeping Bag Records. The label released the single and signed the duo to record an album.

From contemporary reviews, American critics J. D. Considine and Ken Tucker predominantly complemented the hip hop production of the album in lukewarm reviews, while it received greater praise from British press magazines Melody Maker and the NME, which included it in their top-10 albums of 1986. A later review, from Pitchfork and AllMusic, predominantly commented again on the production, with AllMusic finding it being closer related to club music than hip hop while Pitchfork noting the album’s production seeming to be a forbearer of Southern bounce and hyphy scenes.

== Background ==
Kurtis Khaleel (known on the record as Mantronik) was raised in Canada and moved to New York when he was in his teens. While some sources have claimed Mantronik was born in Jamaica, it is unknown where he was born as he refused to comment on his country of birth. Initially more into rock music, Mantronik became more interested in club music and began working at Downtown Records. Mantronik stated that he was "a nerd and really into technology [...] I always used the latest technology, just like I do today." Mantronik used the Roland TR-808 drum machine on the album stating that he loved the bass the record gave. MC Tee was born in the Bronx and had family whose roots were in Haiti. He had lived there from ages 10 to 15 and then returned to New York. MC Tee was working for Burns Telecommunications in Manhattan selling equipment, which was near Downtown Records where Mantronik worked. Before recording anything, Tee had performed at clubs such as the Roxy. According to Tee, he gave Kurtis his DJ name, in which he suggested "Mantronik", stating, "you're a man who is electronic." Initially, MC Tee wanted to be a DJ but felt that he could also be an MC.

Mantronik saved $80 for studio time and cut a demo for the song "Fresh is the Word" with MC Tee. Tee recalled that Kurtis wanted to do a record like Davy DMX's "One for the Treble" when they first talked about working together. Tee did not recall where "Fresh Is the Word" was specifically recorded, suggesting it was "some fashion institute or art school".

The demo caught the attention of Will Socolov of Sleeping Bag Records. Socolov recalled that Mantronik had bumped into him and fellow Danceteria DJ Freddy Bastone on the street and that Mantronik started begging "Please let me go with you guys to the studio!" Mantronik later took him to Downtown Records, where Tee was to do a live version of "Fresh is the Word". Socolov stated that "There were probably 20 kids there and they were all grooving to it. I signed it immediately. It was hot." The label released the single as a single in 1985. While Mantronik said the demo version of the song is the same version on heard on the album, Tee said in interviews that the original demo for "Fresh is the Word" was not how the single turned out as the original was "a lot rougher around the edges."

=== Production ===
Among the first things the duo did was re-record "Fresh is the Word" at INS studio on Murray Street in New York. The engineer for that session for Mantronix was John Poppo. Tee felt that the engineers were important for the album, as Mantronik was "learning each time he went into the studio, a little more with each song we did. But the engineers helped us find the sound that we were looking for."

Tee recalled that Mantronik would work on beats on his Roland drum machine and they would meet up at his apartment or at the Sleeping Bag Records offices. Tee would pick a beat he enjoyed and take home a copy to write to it or finish some of them at the studio. After the financially successful release of the single, Socolov quickly moved to have the group record a studio album. Mantronik spoke positively working with the label stating they were a "cool label, they let me do my thing."

The duo arrived at the studio with an 808, which was purchased with advanced money from Socolov. Poppo recalled that Mantronik "wasn't a technician in the studio back then by any stretch, but he was deep into music and hip hop culture. He was more of a beat guy than a producer. As I recall, he didn't even produce Tee's vocals." Poppo recalled that Socolov was in the studio at all times and that Tee, Mantronik and Socolov were "almost a trio" and that Socolov was "very hands-on and deserves a lot of credits for those songs as well." Socolov suggested to the group bring in the Latin Rascals to edit song "Bassline". Mantronik used a Juno synthesizer, with Mantronik recalling it only took about a day to record. For other music, Tee used a vocoder for the song "Needle to the Groove".

Two songs were recorded at INS with Poppo as the engineer: "Fresh is the Word" and "Needle to The Groove". The four other songs were completed at Al Cohen Studio. Scocolov stated that Al Cohen Studio was at the Chelsea Hotel where Al lived, with the music recorded at his apartment. Cohen recalled that he was not familiar with the group, and most likely met them to record through ads for recording services in the Village Voice. It is not clear where the "Mega-Mix" by the Diamond Two was completed.

== Music ==
Songs like song "Hardcore Hip-hop" was about the roots of hip hop while other tracks like "Get Stupid Fresh Part 1" were done "on the spot" according to Mantronik.

== Release ==
The re-done version of "Fresh is the Word" was released by Sleeping Bag Records by mid-1985. Mantronik recalled that the singles from the album sold well, specifically "Fresh". Socolov stated that the album "did OK, maybe 150,000 units" in the United States but that "it was massive in Europe. It was more than double our American sales over there." Socolov said it was the labels biggest selling album at that point.

== Reception ==
Professional ratings
Review scores
Source	Rating
AllMusic	5/5 stars
Pitchfork Media	8.08/10

From contemporary reviews, J. D. Considine gave the album a three star rating, noting its sound was "pretty run-of-the mill for hip-hop" with its "vintage electronic percussion" and M.C. Tee's "standard-issue raps." Considine specifically noted that Mantronix "definitely has a way with the music. They assemble their jams with funky finesse, revving up the machiner behind "Bassline" until the rap evaporates into pure rhythm" and that "Mega-Mix" was "about as CONCRETE as this music gets." "The Album"'s track "Bassline" was praised by Ken Tucker who called it the most well-known cut as "a slinky dance-music composition that employs rap-music cadences to achieve a choppy frenetic effect" while stating the rest of the album "Isn't as innovative" with the exception of "Mega-Mix" which was "almost abstract collage of sound effects, comes close." Paul Mathur of Melody Maker proclaimed the album went "for the paint stripper approach, burning away electro's lesser indulgences and leaving hard core hip hop of the highest order." The NME placed the album at number 10 on its year-end list of best albums of 1986.

From retrospective reviews, Nate Patrin of Pitchfork found the album to have "undergone a strangely accidental evolution" finding that it was "Beloved by veteran heads yet considered incredibly dated in the sample-artisan Dre/RZA/Pete Rock/Primo 90s, it's since started sounding a lot more like a well-aging and prescient forebear of Southern bounce and hyphy". Patrin found the 2008 Deluxe edition was mostly strong for its original tracks and that the songs "Hardcore Hip-Hop" and "Needle to the Groove" "boast some of the most intricately assembled syncopated beats heard in any digital production to that point"

== Track listing ==
1. "Bassline" (Kurtis Mantronik, MC Tee) – 5:26
2. "Needle to the Groove" (Mantronik, MC Tee) – 3:41
3. "Mega-Mix" (Mantronik, MC Tee) – 5:35
4. "Hardcore Hip-Hop" (Mantronik, MC Tee) – 6:18
5. "Ladies" (Mantronik, MC Tee) – 6:55
6. "Get Stupid "Fresh" Part I" (Mantronik, MC Tee) – 3:52
7. "Fresh Is the Word" (Mantronik, MC Tee) – 5:31

=== Bonus tracks ===
In February 2006, Virgin/EMI re-released the album in the UK with five bonus tracks and new cover art.

1. "Ladies (Revived)"
2. "Bassline (Stretched)"
3. "Hardcore Hip Hop (NME Mix)"
4. "Ladies (Dub)"
5. "Ladies (Instrumental)"

=== Double-CD deluxe edition bonus tracks ===
On February 12, 2008, Traffic Entertainment Group released a double-CD edition of the album, titled simply Mantronix, with an extra disc and new cover art. The extra tracks are as follows:

1. "Bassline (Club Version)"
2. "Needle to the Groove (12" Version)"
3. "Fresh Is the Word (12" Version)"
4. "Ladies (UK Remix)"
5. "Bassline (Radio Version)"
6. "Bassline (12" Version)"
7. "Needle to the Groove (Alternate Version)"
8. "Jamming on the Groove"
9. "Needle to the Groove (Live)"
10. "Ladies (Live)"
11. "Ladies (A Capella)"
12. "Get Stupid "Fresh" Part 1 (A Capella)"
13. "Fresh Is the Word (Radio Version)"
14. "Fresh Is the Beat"
15. "Fresh Is the Word (A Capella)"

== Legacy ==
Some tracks on the album were sampled on by artists who made them into hit songs, such as Beck's "Where It's At" without acknowledgement of the source. Mantronik later stated that "It bothers me when I'm not even acknowledged, but it's even worse when they sample your shit and you don't get any credit." while acknowledging other artists who have spoken positively about him such as DJ Shadow and the Chemical Brothers.

== Chart positions ==
Album

Chart (1986)	Peak position
US Top R&B/Hip-Hop Albums	47

Singles

Year	Single	Billboard chart	Position
1985	"Fresh Is the Word"	Hot Dance Music/Maxi-Singles Sales	16
1985	"Needle to the Groove"	Hot Dance Music/Maxi-Singles Sales	23
