= MC Tee =

American rapper

- Also known as: MC Tee; Crime Master Tee; Tee-Ski
- Born: Touré Embden; September 3, 1964 (age 61); Port-au-Prince, Haiti
- Origin: New York City, U.S.
- Genres: Old school hip hop, electro
- Instrument: Microphone
- Years active: 1984–1988
- Labels: Sleeping Bag Records; Capitol/EMI Records

Touré Embden, known by the stage name MC Tee, is a Haitian-American emcee and co-founder (with DJ Kurtis Mantronik) of the 1980s old school hip hop and electro funk group Mantronix.

== Mantronix emcee ==
In 1984, Brooklyn native MC Tee met Kurtis Mantronik at Downtown Records in Manhattan, where MC Tee was a regular customer, and Mantronik worked as the in-store DJ. The duo soon made a demo, formed the group Mantronix, and eventually signed with Sleeping Bag Records.

MC Tee co-wrote Mantronix's debut single, "Fresh is the Word," a club hit in 1985, reaching #16 on the Hot Dance Singles Sales chart. "Fresh is the Word" was featured on Mantronix's debut album, Mantronix: The Album, which was released the same year.

Mantronix's second album, Music Madness, was released in 1986. While MC Tee's rhyming style on the album continued in the traditional b-boy fashion of the times, Mantronik's club oriented production and mixing in Music Madness tended to attract more dance music and electro funk aficionados than hardcore, old school hip hop fans.

In 1987, Mantronix signed with Capitol/EMI and released In Full Effect the following year (1988). MC Tee abruptly left Mantronix shortly after the release of In Full Effect to enlist in the United States Air Force.

In a 1997 interview with MTV Europe, Kurtis Mantronik commented on the departure of MC Tee from Mantronix:

MC Tee left the group because he wanted to further his education. And just I think dealing with the politics of the business, he just wasn't cut out for that. And it kind of got him a little frustrated.

Mantronix continued for two more albums following MC Tee's departure, 1990's This Should Move Ya and 1991's The Incredible Sound Machine, with Bryce "Luvah" Wilson replacing MC Tee, before the group finally disbanded in 1991.

== Legal issues ==
Touré Embden was arrested and subsequently convicted of child molestation and given a 15 Year term in 2003. He served six years and was released in 2009.
