= Mantronix =

American hip hop band

- Final Mantronix line-up (1991): (l-r) Jade Trini, Kurtis Mantronik, Bryce Wilson

Background information
- Origin: New York City, U.S.
- Genres: Hip-hop, electro-funk, house
- Years active: 1984–1991, 2021–present
- Labels: Sleeping Bag Records; Capitol/EMI Records; Virgin/EMI Records (Europe)
- Members: Kurtis Mantronik
- Past members: MC Tee; Bryce "Luvah" Wilson; D.J. D Jade Trini

Mantronix are an influential 1980s hip-hop and electro funk music group from New York City. The band was formed by DJ Kurtis Mantronik (Kurtis el Khaleel) and rapper MC Tee (Touré Embden). The group is primarily remembered for its pioneering blend of old-school hip-hop, electronic and club music. They underwent several genre and line-up changes during its seven-year existence between 1984 and 1991 and released five albums beginning with their 1985 debut The Album.

== History ==
=== Early years: 1984–1988 ===
Kurtis Mantronik (Kurtis el Khaleel), a Jamaican-American émigré, began experimenting with electro music in the early 1980s, inspired by early electro tracks like "Riot in Lagos" (1980) by Yellow Magic Orchestra's Ryuichi Sakamoto. In 1984, while working as the in-store DJ for Downtown Records in Manhattan, Mantronik met MC Tee, a Haitian-born, Flatbush, Brooklyn-based rapper (and regular record store customer). The duo soon made a demo, "Fresh Is The Word," and eventually signed with William Socolov's Sleeping Bag Records.

==== The Album ====
Mantronix's debut single, "Fresh Is the Word," was a club hit in 1985, reaching No. 16 on Billboard's Hot Dance Singles Sales chart, and was featured on The Album which was released the same year. Mantronix's efforts on The Album and its effect on early hip-hop and electronic music is perhaps best summed up by music critic Omar Willey's observation in 2000:

Featuring "Fresh Is the Word" and the new tracks "Bassline" and "Electro Mega-Mix," Mantronix defined the new sound of electro-funk. Mantronik used a polyrhythmic style, similar to West African log drumming, but instead of acoustic drums, the rhythm would be carried by the combination of electronic drums, synthesizer, vocoder and/or synthesized voice over a bass line completely played on the synth. No samples of James Brown here. This was truly electronic music: spare, funky and immensely danceable, an homage and simultaneous extension of old-school hip hop's electronic template that had started with "Planet Rock" in 1982. The feeling of Afrika Bambaataa, Grandmaster Flash, Kraftwerk and Neu all combined in Mantronik's music. It was a neat tie between old-school and new jack, and Mantronix had the field to themselves.

The influence of The Album is seen among other artists through the sampling of "Needle to the Groove" by Beck in the single "Where It's At" from the 1996 album, Odelay ("we've got two turntables and a microphone..."), as well as, "Fresh Is The Word" by the Beastie Boys in the single "Jimmy James" from the 1992 album, Check Your Head ("for all the Blacks, Puerto Ricans, and the White people too...") The Beastie Boys later sampled "Bassline" for the song "3 the Hard Way" on their 2004 album To the 5 Boroughs.

==== Music Madness ====
Mantronix's second album, Music Madness, was released in 1986. While MC Tee's rhyming style on the album continued in the traditional b-boy fashion of the times, Mantronik's club-oriented production and mixing in Music Madness tended to attract more electronic dance music and electro funk aficionados than hardcore hip-hop fans. During this period, while Mantronix was signed to Sleeping Bag Records, Mantronik was employed by the label in their A&R Department, while also producing other artists and groups, including Just-Ice, T La Rock, Nocera and Joyce Sims.

==== In Full Effect ====
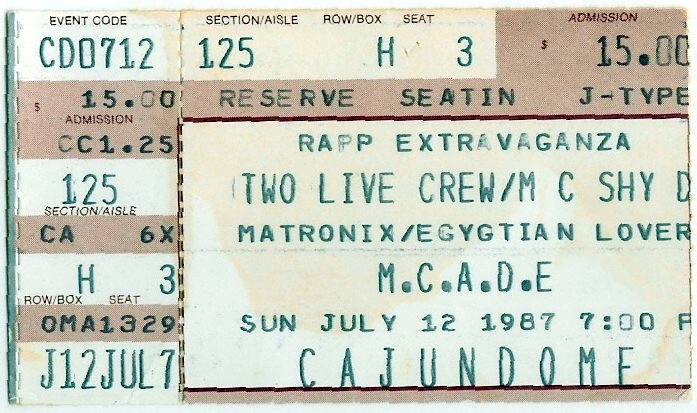
A concert ticket from a 1987 Mantronix performance in Lafayette, Louisiana.

Mantronix signed with Capitol Records in 1987, in what was one of the first 7-figure deals for a hip-hop group, and released In Full Effect in 1988, which, according to the liner notes, was the first album to be mastered from DAT instead of reel-to-reel tape. The album continued in and expanded on the hip-hop/electro funk/dance music vein of its predecessor, eventually reaching No. 18 on the Top R&B/Hip-Hop Albums chart, Mantronix's highest showing for an album. In Full Effect marked the last Mantronix album with rapper MC Tee, who left the group to enlist in the United States Air Force. Mantronix's 1988 track "King of the Beats" was one of the first songs to sample the Amen break taken from the Winstons' song "Amen, Brother" from their 1969 album Color Him Father.

=== Later era: 1989–1991 ===
==== This Should Move Ya ====
Following the departure of MC Tee, rapper Bryce "Luvah" Wilson and Mantronik's cousin, D.J. D., joined the group. Mantronik met Wilson, a fellow Sleeping Bag Records label mate, while doing production work for Wilson's aborted solo project.

The album spawned two top-10 hits on the British singles chart, "Got to Have Your Love" at No. 4, and "Take Your Time" (featuring Wondress) at No. 10. In the United States, the album reached No. 61 on the Top R&B/Hip-Hop Albums chart. In a 1991 interview, Kurtis Mantronik commented on the commercial success of "Got to Have Your Love":

When I did "Got To Have Your Love", I did it for a reason. I did it because I wanted to get a song on the radio.

==== The Incredible Sound Machine ====
Mantronix's final release, with vocalist Jade Trini replacing D.J. D, was The Incredible Sound Machine in 1991. Grammy Award-nominated neo soul singer/songwriter Angie Stone co-wrote seven of the eleven tracks that appeared on The Incredible Sound Machine. The Incredible Sound Machine, which tended to favor R&B, new jack swing and dance music over hip-hop, was considered both a critical and commercial disappointment. Shortly after a European tour and promotion related to the release of The Incredible Sound Machine, the group disbanded, and Mantronik left the music industry altogether for seven years. Mantronik resurfaced in Europe in the late 1990s, producing house and techno artists, and remains active in pop-oriented electronic music.

=== 2021–present ===
Mantronik reformed Mantronix in 2021. He produced and jointly released three hip-hop songs that featured New York hip-hop emcee Bruse Wane. The songs "Money Talks", "Era of the AI" and "When the Doves Fly" were jointly released by Mantronik on his Mantronix Classics Label and Wane's Wane Enterprises Label. Mantronik produced directed and edited three music videos for all three songs. They appeared on his Mantronix official YouTube channel. He also began doing production work for Bronx rapper Just-Ice.

Mantronix has been active as of 2023 and continues to regularly release singles under a category he calls Arena Rap specifically with Just-Ice. Both artists have released tracks titled "Rockin Worldwide,” “Don't Bring Me Nothing Soft” and “A Long Time.” Mantronix has also remixed and released a rework of Debbie Deb’s "When I Hear Music", "Needle to the Groove 2025 & Beyond” and "Not Just Knee Deep" by Funkadelic. Mantronix and Just-Ice released their first track in many years called "Get Your Drink On, Get Your Freak On" which is a reworking of “Cold Gettin’ Dumb.” Mantronik has said in interviews that “Cold Gettin’ Dumb” is among his favorite beats he has produced. It was originally played live in the studio with Just-Ice recording vocals, as the beat was never sequenced, and took about 20 minutes to produce. Since 2023, Mantronix's new material has been released primarily through YouTube Music, YouTube and Bandcamp.

== Discography ==
=== Albums ===
Year	Title	Peak chart positions			Certifications
Year	Title	US	US R&B	UK	Certifications
1985	The Album	―	47	45	
1986	Music Madness	―	27	66	
1988	In Full Effect	108	18	39	
1990	This Should Move Ya	161	61	18	BPI: Silver
1991	The Incredible Sound Machine	―	―	36	
"—" denotes releases that did not chart or were not released in that territory.

=== Compilation albums ===
Album information
The Best of Mantronix
- Released: 1990
The Best of Mantronix 1985–1999
- Released: March 15, 1999
- Singles: "Needle to the Groove", "Bassline", "King of the Beats", "Push Yer Hands Up"
That's My Beat
- Released: 2002
Remixed & Rare
- Released: May 25, 2004
The Ultra Selection
- Released: March 14, 2005

=== Singles ===
Year	Single	Peak positions											Certifications	Album
Year	Single	US	US R&B	US Dance	NZ	NED	BEL (FLA)	GER	AUT	SWI	IRE	UK	Certifications	Album
1985	"Fresh Is the Word" (US only)	—	—	—	—	—	—	—	—	—	—	—		The Album
1985	"Needle to the Groove" (US only)	—	—	—	—	—	—	—	—	—	—	—		The Album
1986	"Ladies"	—	—	—	—	—	—	—	—	—	—	55		The Album
1986	"Bassline"	—	—	27	—	—	—	—	—	—	—	34		The Album
1987	"Who Is It?"	—	68	21	—	87	—	—	—	—	—	40		Music Madness
1987	"Scream"	—	—	—	—	—	—	—	—	—	—	46		Music Madness
1988	"Sing a Song"	—	—	—	—	39	—	—	—	—	—	61		In Full Effect
1988	"Simple Simon"	—	—	19	—	69	—	—	—	—	—	72		In Full Effect
1988	"Join Me Please" (US only)	—	—	—	—	—	—	—	—	—	—	—		In Full Effect
1989	"Got to Have Your Love" (feat. Wondress)	82	26	6	27	15	19	18	17	20	8	4	BPI: Silver	This Should Move Ya
1990	"Take Your Time" (feat. Wondress)	—	—	15	—	23	—	63	—	—	17	10		This Should Move Ya
1991	"Don't Go Messin' with My Heart"	—	—	—	—	26	—	—	—	—	—	22		The Incredible Sound Machine
1991	"Step to Me (Do Me)"	—	—	23	—	—	—	—	—	—	—	59		The Incredible Sound Machine
1991	"Flower Child"	—	—	—	—	78	—	—	—	—	—	—		The Incredible Sound Machine
1996	"It's Time to Party" (feat. Althea McQueen)	—	—	42	—	—	—	—	—	—	—	—		Interactive 1
"—" denotes releases that did not chart or were not released.
