= The Incredible Sound Machine =

- Original album artwork by Mark Ryden

Studio album by Mantronix
- Released: March 26, 1991
- Genre: Hip hop; dance; new jack swing; house; R&B
- Label: Capitol; EMI 0777 7 94570 2 1 C2-94570
- Producer: Kurtis Mantronik; Dave Bright; Bryce Luvah

Mantronix chronology
This Should Move Ya (1990)	The Incredible Sound Machine (1991)

Professional ratings
Review scores
Source	Rating
AllMusic	2/5 stars
Chicago Tribune	3/4 stars
RapReviews	4.5/10
Q	4/5 stars

The Incredible Sound Machine is the fifth and final studio album by old school hip hop/electro funk group Mantronix, and the third Mantronix album released on Capitol Records. The Incredible Sound Machine featured new member, vocalist Jade Trini, who replaced D.J. D. Trini joined rapper Bryce "Luvah" Wilson (who made his debut on Mantronix's previous album, 1990's This Should Move Ya), and founding member, DJ Kurtis Mantronik.

The Incredible Sound Machine was a departure from previous Mantronix albums, in that it favored house music, R&B, and new jack swing over the old school hip hop/electro funk sound for which the group was most famously known.

Shortly after the European tour and promotion related to the release of the album, which was critically panned and commercially disappointing, Mantronix disbanded.

== Track listing ==
1. "Step to Me (Do Me)" (Mantronik, Angie Stone) – 4:00
2. "Don't Go Messin' with My Heart" (Dave Bright, Stone) – 4:20
3. "Flower Child (Summer of Love)" (Mantronik, Stone, Terry Taylor) – 4:56
4. "Gimme' Something" (Mantronik, Stone, Taylor) – 4:07
5. "Put a Little Love On Hold (Duet with Terry Taylor)" (Mantronik, Stone, Bright) – 4:44
6. "Well I Guess You" (Mantronik, Stone, Bright) – 3:47
7. "Step to Me (Do Me) (12" Extended Mix) (Bonus Track)" (Mantronik, Stone) – 5:29
8. "If You Could Read My Mind" (Mantronik, Bryce Wilson) – 4:40
9. "Make It Funky" (Wilson) – 3:38
10. "(I'm) Just Adjustin' My Mic ('91)" (Mantronik, Wilson) – 3:11
11. "Operation Mindcrime" (Mantronik, Wilson) – 2:19

== Chart positions ==
Album

Year	Chart	Peak position
1991	UK Albums Chart	36

Singles

Year	Single	Chart	Peak position
1991	"Don't Go Messin' with My Heart"	UK Singles Chart	22
1991	"Step to Me"	UK Singles Chart	59
