= Kurtis Mantronik =

Jamaican musician and DJ

- Born: Graham Curtis el Khaleel; September 4, 1965 (age 60); Spanish Town, Jamaica
- Origin: New York City (previously); London, England
- Genres: Southern hip hop; electronic; house; big beat; trip hop; trap
- Occupations: DJ, producer
- Instruments: Turntables, synthesizers, keyboards, drum machine, sampler, sequencer, programming
- Years active: 1984–1991; 1998–present
- Labels: Sleeping Bag (Mantronix); Capitol/EMI (Mantronix); Oxygen Music Works; Southern Fried; Eye Industries; Street DNA

Kurtis el Khaleel (born Graham Curtis el Khaleel, September 4, 1965), known by the stage name Kurtis Mantronik, is a Jamaican-born hip hop and electronic musician, DJ, remixer, and producer. He was the leader, DJ, and keyboardist of the influential 1980s hip hop and electro-funk group Mantronix. He currently lives in South Africa where he has produced and remixed house and techno music tracks by artists such as India, Junior Senior, Kylie Minogue, Fatboy Slim, the Chemical Brothers, Michael Gray, Victoria Beckham, Liberty X, S Club, and Mim. Mantronik was influential in the development of hip hop music: notably, he laid the foundations for Southern hip hop genres such as Miami bass and trap music, and helped popularize the Amen break.

== Early years and Mantronix era (1984–1991) ==
Mantronik was born in Jamaica to a Syrian father and a Jamaican mother. He emigrated to Sherwood Park, Alberta Canada with his family at the age of 7, before eventually settling in Dyker Heights, Brooklyn on 73rd Street. It was around this time that his interest in electro music began when he heard "Riot in Lagos" (1980) by Yellow Magic Orchestra's Ryuichi Sakamoto on the radio, inspiring him to experiment with electro music a few years later.

While working as the in-store DJ for Downtown Records in Manhattan, Mantronik met Jamaica-born, Brooklyn-based emcee MC Tee (né Touré Embden) in 1984. The duo soon made a demo, and eventually signed with William Socolov's Sleeping Bag Records.

=== The Album ===
Mantronix's debut single, "Fresh Is The Word", was a club hit in 1985, reaching No. 16 on Billboard magazine's Hot Dance Singles Sales chart, and was featured on The Album, which was released the same year. Mantronik's efforts on The Album and his impact on early hip-hop and electronic music is perhaps best summed up by music critic Omar Willey's observation in 2000:

Featuring 'Fresh is the Word' and the new tracks 'Bassline' and 'Mega-Mix,' Mantronix defined the new sound of electro-funk. Mantronik used a polyrhythmic style, similar to West African log drumming, but instead of acoustic drums, the rhythm would be carried by the combination of electronic drums, synthesizer, vocoder, [or] synthesized voice over a bass line completely played on the synth. No samples of James Brown here. This was truly electronic music: spare, funky and immensely danceable, an homage and simultaneous extension of old-school hip hop's electronic template that had started with 'Planet Rock' in 1982. The feeling of Afrika Bambaataa, Grandmaster Flash, Kraftwerk, and Neu! [were] all combined in Mantronik's music. It was a neat tie between old-school and new jack, and Mantronix had the field to [itself].

=== Music Madness ===
Mantronix's second album, Music Madness, was released in 1986. While MC Tee's rhyming style on the album continued in the traditional b-boy fashion of the times, Mantronik's club-oriented production and mixing in Music Madness tended to attract more electronic dance music and electro-funk aficionados than hardcore hip hop fans.

=== A&R career with Sleeping Bag Records ===
From 1984 to 1986, during the same period Mantronix as a group was signed to Sleeping Bag Records, Mantronik was also individually employed by the label in its A&R Department, where he signed hip-hop group EPMD to its first recording contract with sister label Fresh Records. In addition to being an A&R representative for the label, Mantronik also produced recordings for other Sleeping Bag and Fresh Records associated artists and groups, including emcees KRS-One, Just-Ice, and T La Rock; freestyle vocalist Nocera; and R&B singer-songwriter Joyce Sims. During this time he remixed "Vertigo (Do The Demolition)" for Duran Duran, which was released on its 1987 US album Master Mixes.

The origins of trap music's beats have been traced back to the work of Kurtis Mantronik during this era. The earliest song to be identified as an early form of trap music is Mantronik's single "Bass Machine" (1986), featuring rap vocals by T La Rock. Mantronik's backing track for the song featured key trap elements, including Roland TR-808 bass, hi-hats, triplet snares and pitching down. Mantronik's work, particularly "Bass Machine" (1986), was also pivotal to the development of Southern hip hop's Miami bass genre.

=== In Full Effect ===
Mantronix signed with Capitol/EMI Records in 1987, and released In Full Effect in 1988, which continued in and expanded on the hip-hop/electro funk/dance music vein of its predecessor, eventually reaching No. 18 on the Top R&B/Hip-Hop Albums chart, Mantronix's highest showing for an album. In Full Effect marked the last Mantronix album with emcee MC Tee, who left the group to enlist in the United States Air Force.

Mantronik's 1988 track "King of the Beats" was one of the first songs to sample the Amen break. "King of the Beats" itself became one of the most sampled songs in music history, having been sampled more than 200 times, rivaling that of "Amen, Brother" itself.

=== This Should Move Ya ===
Following the departure of MC Tee, emcee Bryce "Luvah" Wilson and Mantronik's cousin DJD joined Mantronix for 1990's This Should Move Ya. Mantronik met Wilson, a fellow Sleeping Bag Records label mate, while doing production for Wilson's aborted solo project.

The album spawned two top-10 hits on the British singles chart, "Got to Have Your Love" at No. 4, and "Take Your Time" (featuring vocalist Wondress) at No. 10. In the United States, the album reached No. 61 on the Top R&B/Hip-Hop Albums chart. In a 1991 interview, Mantronik commented on the commercial success of "Got to Have Your Love":

When I did "Got to Have Your Love", I did it for a reason: I did it because I wanted to get a song on the radio.

=== The Incredible Sound Machine ===
Mantronix's final release, with vocalist Jade Trini replacing D.J. D, was The Incredible Sound Machine in 1991, which favored R&B, new jack swing, and dance music over hip hop. It was considered both a critical and commercial disappointment. The group disbanded shortly after a European tour and promotion related to the release of the album, and Mantronik left the music industry altogether for seven years.

== Solo career (1998–present) ==
Mantronik dropped out of the music industry after the breakup of Mantronix in 1991. According to a July 2002 interview with Hip Hop Connection magazine:

I dropped out of the scene from 1991 to about '98. I stopped making music because I was burned out. I had to deal with some legal issues and it all took its toll on me. I started doing all this stuff when I was 17—I was working for the label (Sleeping Bag Records) day-in, day-out, and I had no time for myself. Sometimes I'd stay in the studio for two or three days and sleep on the studio floor because I didn't want to lose the settings on the console...[B]y the time we'd come out of that place we were green! I began to resent it and eventually started backing off from a lot of stuff. Then new jack started coming in and house started to take over.

=== I Sing the Body Electro ===
Mantronik moved from New York to the UK in the early 2000s, after releasing his well-received solo album, I Sing the Body Electro (which featured female MC Traylude), in 1998, on New York indie label Oxygen Music Works.

AllMusic critic John Bush noted:

I Sing the Body Electro is that rare exception to the rule that influential artists should never attempt a ten-years-later comeback trying the same style their current inheritors have made commercial. Mantronik's production methods are completely up to date (and then some), resulting in an album that perfectly balances old-school sampladelic hip-hop with the breakbeat-energized dance music of the late '90s.

=== Journey to Utopia ===
Mantronik was most recently signed to London-based record label Street DNA, a sister label of the StreetSounds label, which released his newest studio album, Journey to Utopia, in late 2014.

The somewhat reclusive Mantronik opened Facebook, Twitter, and SoundCloud pages in connection with the promotion of the album.

=== Remixing and production career ===
Since 1998, Mantronik has produced and remixed tracks for pop, electronic dance music artists and groups such as Kylie Minogue, Junior Senior, Fatboy Slim, The Chemical Brothers, Victoria Beckham, Michael Gray, Liberty X (which, in 2002, covered Mantronix's "Got to Have Your Love" from Mantronix's 1990 This Should Move Ya album), and Mim (the featured vocalist on Mantronik's 2003 EP release How Did You Know). He remixed classical composer Steve Reich's Drumming for release on the Reich Remixed album in 1999, and he was enlisted for two remixes of the title track of the Shirley Bassey remix album Diamonds Are Forever in 2000.

In addition to record production, Mantronik produced music for the Dance Dance Revolution and TrickStyle video game series.

Mantronik remains active in pop oriented electronic music, such as house and big beat.

=== Mantronik's return to hip-hop ===
In 2023, Mantronik returned to hip hop. Mantronik reformed the group Mantronix and made Bronx, New York rapper Bruse Wane a member of the group. He produced and released three hip-hop songs that featured Bruse Wane as the main vocalist. The songs were "Money Talks", "Era of the AI" and "When the Doves Fly". The songs were jointly released by Mantronik and Bruse Wane, under Mantronik's Mantronix classics label, and Bruse Wane's Wane Enterprises label. Mantronik produced, directed and edited three music videos for all three releases, which all appear on his official Mantronix YouTube channel. The music videos have garnered over one million views combined.

== Discography ==
=== Solo albums ===
Album information
I Sing the Body Electro
- Released: September 1, 1998
- RIAA certification: N/A
- Singles: "Push Yer Hands Up", "Mad", "King of the Beat (v3.0)", "Bass Machine Re-tuned"
Journey to Utopia
- Released: November 28, 2014
- RIAA certification: N/A

=== Solo EPs/singles ===
Album information
TrickStyle EP
- Released: March 14, 2000
- RIAA certification: N/A
How Did You Know
- Released: June 16, 2003
- Chart position: No. 16 UK Singles Chart
- RIAA certification: N/A

=== Mantronix albums (1985–1991) ===
Album information
The Album
- Released: 1985
- Chart position: No. 47 Top R&B/Hip-Hop Albums
- RIAA certification: N/A
- Singles: "Fresh Is the Word", "Bassline", "Needle to the Groove", "Ladies"
Music Madness
- Released: 1986
- Chart position: No. 27 Top R&B/Hip-Hop Albums
- RIAA certification: N/A
- Singles: "Who Is It?", "Scream", "We Control the Dice"
In Full Effect
- Released: 1988
- Chart position: No. 18 Top R&B/Hip-Hop Albums
- RIAA certification: N/A
- Singles: "Simple Simon", "Join Me, Please...", "Do You Like...Mantronik?"
This Should Move Ya
- Released: 1990
- Chart position: No. 61 Top R&B/Hip-Hop Albums
- RIAA certification: Gold
- Singles: "Got to Have Your Love", "Take Your Time (featuring Wondress)", "King of the Beats"
The Incredible Sound Machine
- Released: 1991
- RIAA certification: N/A
- Singles: "Step to Me", "If You Could Read My Mind"
