= Peitor Angell =

- Born: Seth Tomasini
- Labels: Frixion Records, Buon-Art Music
- Website: www.peitorangell.com

Peitor Angell is an American/Canadian Film composer, Songwriter, record producer, arranger and conductor.

His credits include production, arrangement, and songwriting work with new artists as well as established Grammy Award winning artists, including Charo, Cissy Houston, Barbra Streisand and Thelma Houston.

As an artist working in collaboration with many guests artists, Angell releases his music via the Buon-Art World record label. His style of composition is often a blend of British Invasion, 60s Pacific Coast Jazz, Alternative Pop and New Age Minimalism Chill Out. Angell also releases music under the name Monte Carlo & His Orchestra.

In 2011, Angell was featured in The Sweet Inspirations documentary This Time. His TV credits include Hollywood and the News, Miss USA and the Roku original movie Jingle Bell Love (2024).

== Discography ==
=== Albums ===
- Kiss Yesterday Goodbye (2015, Buon-Art World)
- Mindscape Vol III (2007, Frixion Records)
- Mindscape Vol II (2005, Frixion Records)
- Mindscape (2004, Frixion Records)
- Morning Music (1996, Alleuvial Entertainment)

=== Singles and EPs ===
- "Reflections in the Summer Rain" (with Savi Labensart) (2017, Buon-Art World)
- "Kiss Yesterday Goodbye" (with Kristi Rose) (2017, Buon-Art World)
- "Turn Up The Radio" (with Sherri Beachfront) (2017, Buon-Art World)
- "Misterioso Sconosciuto" (with Kristi Rose as Monte Carlo & His Orchestra) (2011, Frixion Records)
- "You're the Best Present for Me" (with Kristi Rose as Monte Carlo & His Orchestra) (2010, Frixion Records)
- "Christmas Time is Here" (with Kristi Rose as Monte Carlo & His Orchestra) (2010, Frixion Records)
- "Here in My Heart" (for the film The Clearing) (2004)

=== Film and television scores ===
- Jingle Bell Love (TV Movie) (2024)
- The Christmas Checklist (TV Movie) (2022)
- Speak (2016)
- Skin on Skin (2016)
- Child of the 70's Season 4 (Web Series) (2016)
- Telling of the Shoes (2014)
- Naked Dragon (2014)
- The Making of the Boys (Documentary) (2011)
- Eating Out All You Can Eat (2009)
- All In: The Poker Movie (Documentary) (2009)
- When Ocean Meets Sky (2003)
- Who is Bernard Tapie? (Documentary) (2001)
- Taking The Plunge (1999)
- Façade (Film) (1999)
- The Velocity of Gary (Film) (1998)
- It's My Party (1996)
- Man of the Year (Film) (1995)
- Lap Dancer (Film) 1995

=== Musical theater works ===
- I Love Lucy Live on Stage (2012)

=== Other recordings ===
As producer

- Charo Fantastico Remixes (2020, Universal Wave)
- Charo "Fantastico" (2020, Universal Wave)
- Charo Sexy Sexy Remixes (2013, Universal Wave)
- Charo "Sexy Sexy" (2013, Universal Wave) - #21 Billboard Club Chart
- The Sweet Inspirations In The Right Place (2012, Frixion Records)
- Pat Hodges Armed & Extremely Soulful (2009, Frixion Records)
- Charo Espana Cani Remixes (2008, Universal Wave) - #14 Billboard Club Chart
- Thelma Houston A Woman's Touch (2007, Shout! Factory Records)
- Pat Hodges Saving My Love Remixes (2004, Frixion Records) - #3 Billboard Club Chart
- Pat Hodges Love Revolution Remixes (2002, Frixion Records) - #9 Billboard Club Chart
- Tippi Britton "I'm On A Holiday" Remix (2001, Klone Records) - #8 UK Club Single
- Pat Hodges "You Make Me Feel G-O-O-D!" (2001, Centaur Entertainment) - #20 Billboard Club Chart

As songwriter

- The Idolls "Give a Dog a Bone" (1990, Atlantic Records) - #26 Club Dance Chart
- Nocera "Let's Go" (1987, Sleeping Bag Records) - #7 Billboard Club Chart
