= Rainbows in culture =

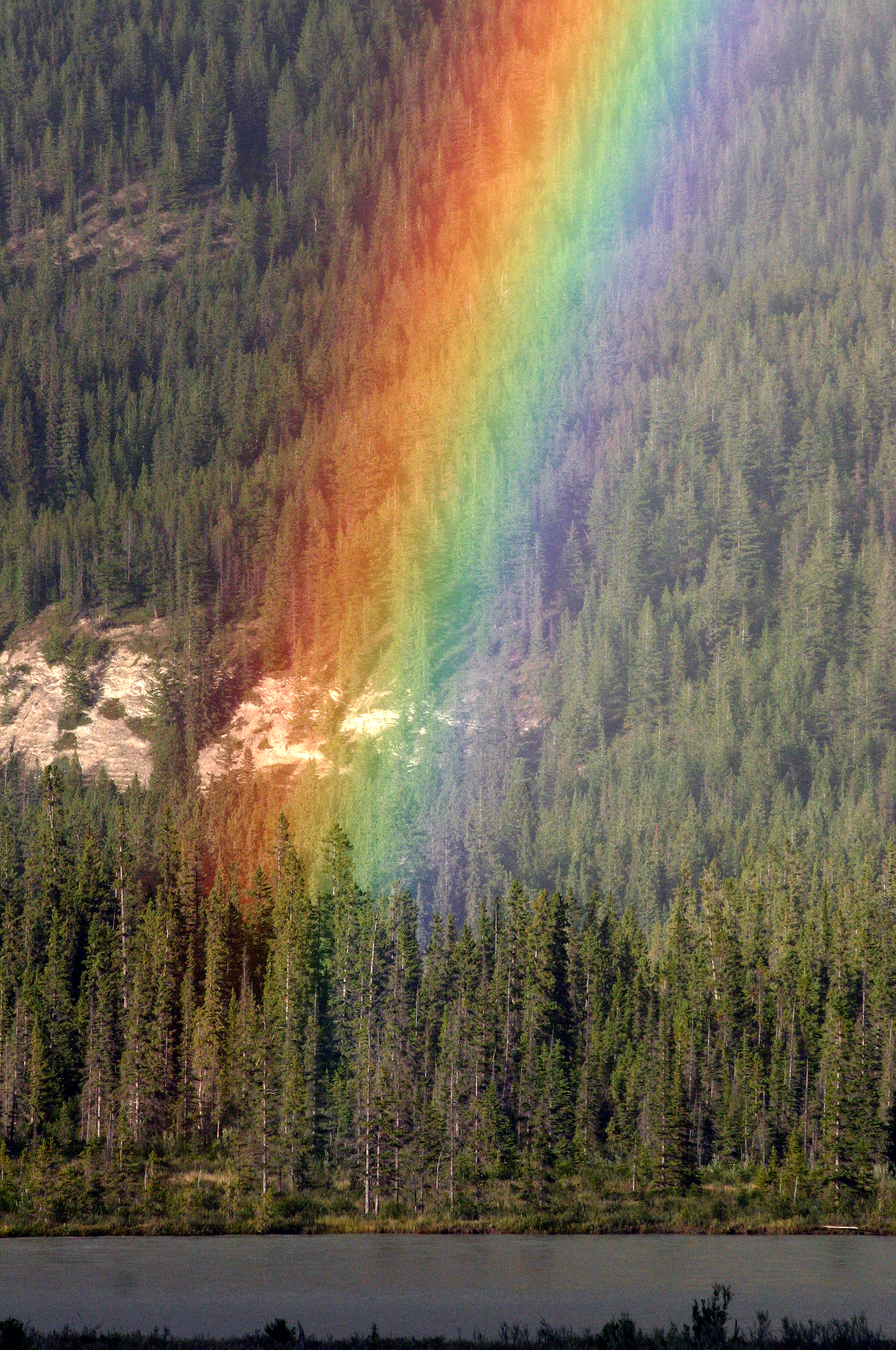
The proverbial "end of the rainbow"

The rainbow has been a favorite component of art and religion throughout history.

== Religion ==
The rainbow has found a place in the mythological systems of many cultures. It is sometimes personified as a deity, such as the Greco-Roman messenger goddess Iris, or the Aboriginal Australian Rainbow Serpent.

In Albanian folk beliefs the rainbow is regarded as the belt of the goddess Prende, and oral legend has it that anyone who jumps over the rainbow changes their sex.

In other cultures it may represent a bridge or an archer's bow. In Judaism and Christianity, the rainbow is associated with God's protection, as it is described in the Book of Genesis (9:11–17) as a sign of the covenant between God and man.

== Art ==
Rainbows are generally described as very colourful and peaceful. The rainbow occurs often in paintings. Frequently these have a symbolic or programmatic significance (for example, Albrecht Dürer's Melancholia I). In particular, the rainbow appears regularly in religious art (for example, Joseph Anton Koch's Noah's Thank Offering). Romantic landscape painters such as J. M. W. Turner and John Constable were more concerned with recording fleeting effects of light (for example, Constable's Salisbury Cathedral from the Meadows). Other notable examples appear in work by Hans Memling, Caspar David Friedrich, and Peter Paul Rubens.

The Blind Girl, oil painting (1856) by John Everett Millais. The rainbow – one of the beauties of nature that the blind girl cannot experience – is used to underline the pathos of her condition.

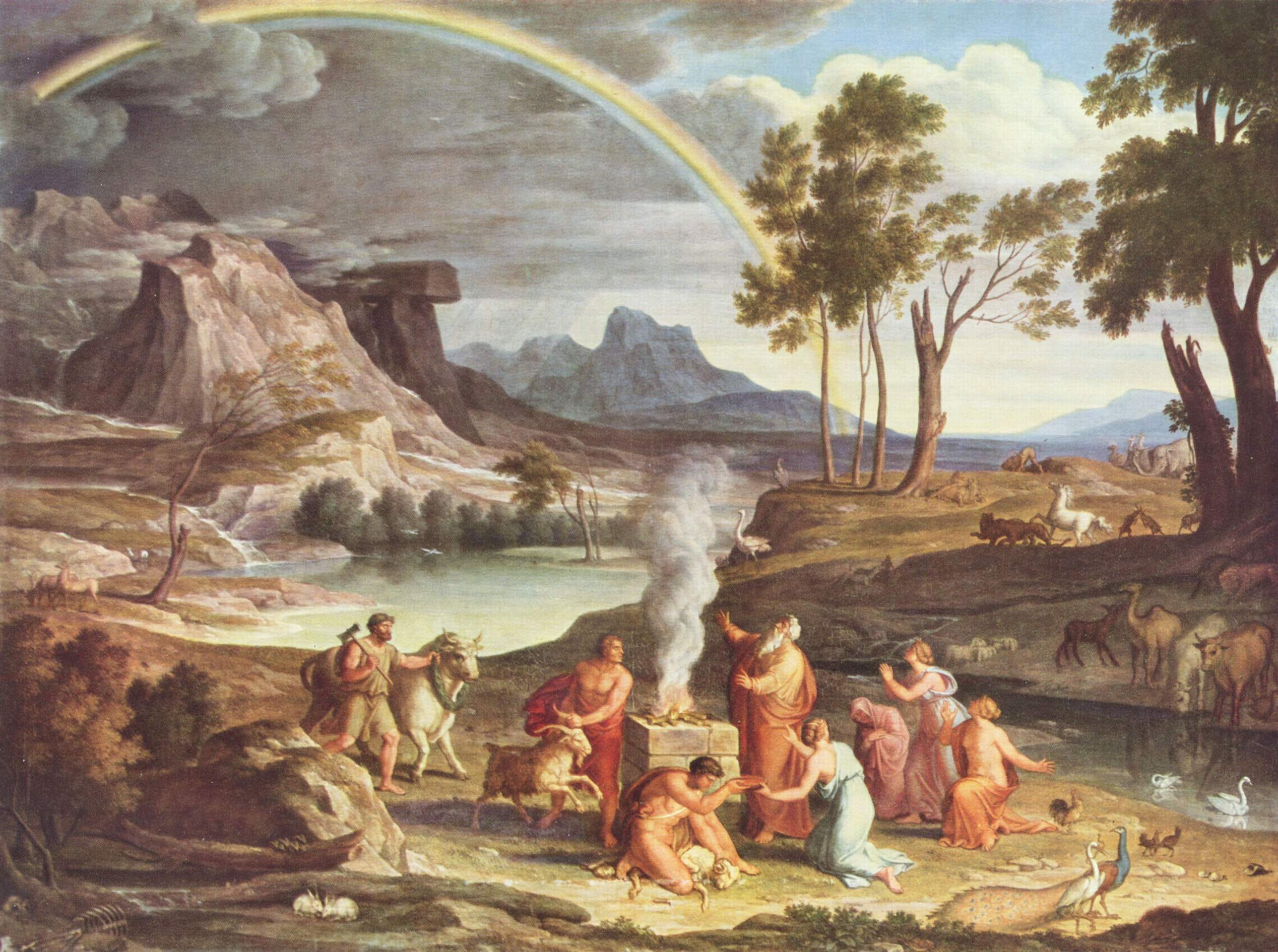
Noah's Thank Offering (c. 1803) by Joseph Anton Koch. Noah builds an altar to the Lord after being delivered from the Flood; God sends the rainbow as a sign of his covenant (Genesis 8–9).

In contemporary visual art, the rainbow often appears as well, notably in Peter Coffin's Untitled (Rainbow), 2005, and in Ugo Rondinone's Hell, Yes!, 2001. Like many other cultural references to the rainbow, these either emphasize the possible sublimity of the natural world or the cheerfulness, joy, and celebration often culturally associated with a profusion of colors.

In 2012, American artist, Michael Jones McKean created a large-scale artwork, The Rainbow. The project created, in part, a fully sustainable prismatic rainbow using thousands of gallons of pressurized harvested rainwater, at times stretching several city blocks in size.

== Heraldry ==
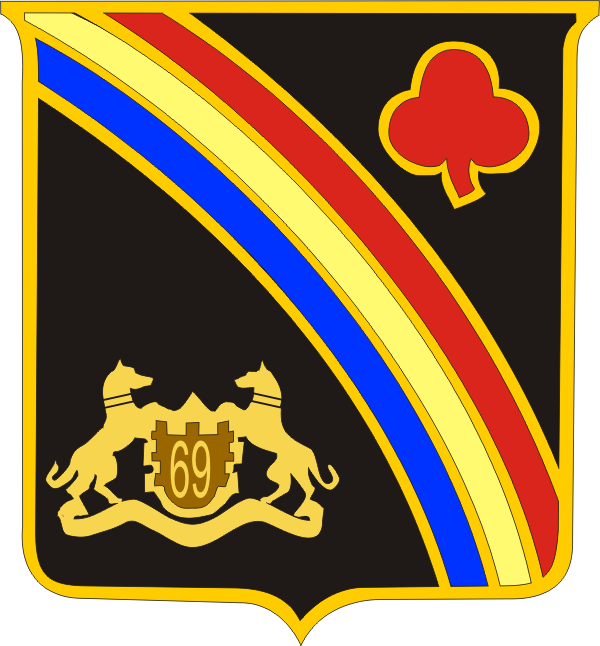
Coats of arms and insignia depicting rainbows (from top left: Regen, Pfreimd, Bouffémont and 69th Infantry Regiment-NY)

In heraldry the rainbow proper consists of 4 bands of colour (Or, Gules, Vert, Argent) with the ends resting on clouds. Generalised examples in coat of arms include those of the towns of Regen and Pfreimd, both in Bavaria, Germany; of Bouffémont, France; and of the 69th Infantry Regiment (New York) of the United States Army National Guard.

== Literature ==
The rainbow inspires metaphor and simile. Virginia Woolf in To the Lighthouse highlights the transience of life and Man's mortality through Mrs Ramsey's thought: "it was all as ephemeral as a rainbow".

Wordsworth's 1802 poem "My Heart Leaps Up" begins:

My heart leaps up when I behold
A rainbow in the sky:
So was it when my life began;
So is it now I am a man;
So be it when I shall grow old,
Or let me die!...

The Newtonian deconstruction of the rainbow is said to have provoked John Keats to lament in his 1820 poem "Lamia":

Do not all charms fly
At the mere touch of cold philosophy?
There was an awful rainbow once in heaven:
We know her woof, her texture; she is given
In the dull catalogue of common things.
Philosophy will clip an Angel's wings,
Conquer all mysteries by rule and line,
Empty the haunted air, and gnomed mine –
Unweave a rainbow

In contrast to this is Richard Dawkins; talking about his 1998 book Unweaving the Rainbow: Science, Delusion and the Appetite for Wonder, wrote:

My title is from Keats, who believed that Newton had destroyed all the poetry of the rainbow by reducing it to the prismatic colours. Keats could hardly have been more wrong, and my aim is to guide all who are tempted by a similar view, towards the opposite conclusion. Science is, or ought to be, the inspiration for great poetry.

== Music ==
- In "Rainbow Connection", a song known for being sung by Kermit the Frog, the idea of a rainbow is seen as something to wish on, as it is popularly seen as a vision, or symbol of hope.
- End of the Rainbow is a stage play with music (or musical drama) by Peter Quilter.
- The song "Rainbow Demon" by Uriah Heep.
- "I Can Sing a Rainbow" is a popular American children's song and a nursery rhyme written by Arthur Hamilton, despite the name of the song, not all the colours mentioned are actually colours of the rainbow.
- Ronnie James Dio used rainbows as a thematic element in many of his songs, particularly as singer and lyrics-writer for Ritchie Blackmore's band Rainbow. Most notable among these are the songs "Catch the Rainbow", "Rainbow Eyes" and the Dio song "Rainbow in the Dark".
- The band Radiohead released an album in 2007 named In Rainbows.
- "Over the Rainbow" is a song sung by the character Dorothy Gale (Judy Garland) in the 1939 musical film The Wizard of Oz.
- "Pocketful of Rainbows" is a song from the 1960 Elvis Presley album, G.I. Blues, written by Fred Wise and Ben Weisman.
- Rainbow Country by Bob Marley.
- In 2017, American singer and songwriter Kesha released the album Rainbow. A song on the album is also called "Rainbow".
- Australian singer Sia released the song "Rainbow" for the 2017 film My Little Pony: The Movie.
- Rätsel is a German folk song, dedicated to the rainbow.

== Film and television ==
- In the 1939 film The Wizard of Oz, lead character Dorothy Gale sings the song "Over the Rainbow" where she fantasises about a place over the rainbow, where the world is in peace and harmony.
- Hallmarks 1983 series Rainbow Brite, about a superhero who keeps the world colorful and alive. She and the Color Kids live in Rainbowland. In 1985 there was a film for the series, Rainbow Brite and the Star Stealer. Rainbow Brite uses the rainbow to travel between Rainbowland and Earth. Her horse Starlite has a rainbow mane and tail.
- The 1988 film The Serpent and the Rainbow
- In the 1996 film Rainbow, damage to a rainbow threatens the world at large.
- In the 2009 film A Shine of Rainbows, the young protagonist is promised to be taken into a rainbow.
- In the 2011 film Marianne, a double rainbow was filmed by chance when Sandra is introduced for the first time.
- In The Care Bears Cheer Bear has a rainbow as a tummy symbol and True Heart Bear and Noble Heart Horse have pastel rainbow hair.

== Flags ==
Rainbow flags tend to be used as a sign of a new era, of hope, or of social change. Rainbow flags have been used in many places over the centuries: in the German Peasants' War in the 16th century, as a symbol of the Cooperative movement; as a symbol of peace, especially in Italy; to represent the Tawantin Suyu, or Inca territory, mainly in Peru and Bolivia; by some Druze communities in the Middle east; by the Jewish Autonomous Oblast; to represent the International Order of the Rainbow for Girls since the early 1920s, and as a modified symbol of gay pride and LGBT social movements since the 1970s. In the 1990s, Archbishop Desmond Tutu and President Nelson Mandela described the newly democratic South Africa as the "rainbow nation", also alluding to its diversity and multiculturalism.

== Rainbow symbol ==
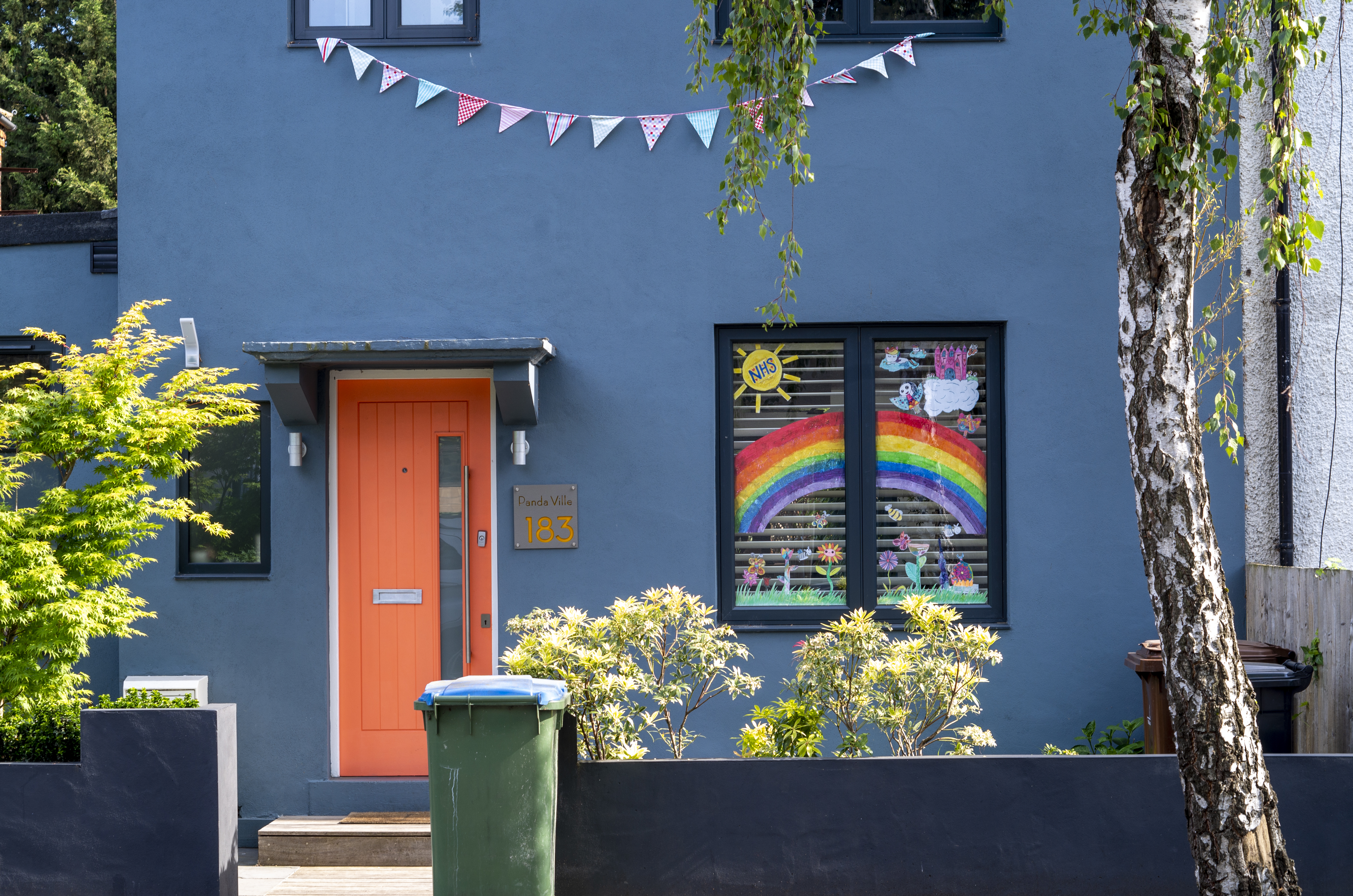
Rainbow window decoration in Walthamstow, May 2020.

The rainbow was adopted as a symbol of hope during the COVID-19 pandemic, especially during periods of lockdown. Households worldwide displayed home-made images of rainbows in their windows, often alongside positive messages.

The rainbow has been a symbol of ethnic and racial diversity. Various Rainbow Coalition movements have used the rainbow as a metaphor for bringing together people from a broad spectrum of races and creeds.

== Culture ==
The Rainbow Bridge (pets) is said to be an afterlife for pets, where deceased animals wait to be reunited with their humans owners once they too pass on. 'Gone to the Rainbow Bridge' and 'helped across the Rainbow Bridge' are used as euphemisms for a pet dying or being euthanized, respectively.
