= Muss i denn =

Song
- Language: Swabian German
- Published: 1827
- Genre: Folk song
- Songwriter: Friedrich Silcher

"Muss i denn" (German for "must I, then") is a German folk song in the Swabian German dialect that has passed into tradition. The present form dates back to 1827, when it was written and made public by Friedrich Silcher. Billboard describes it as "originally a student drinking song at the University of Heidelberg."

The melody and some verses of this song became widely known through Elvis Presley's adaptation "Wooden Heart" in 1960, as well as Joe Dowell's version in 1961, becoming one of the most widely known German songs ever.

== History ==
"Muss i denn" is about a man about to begin travels as a wandering journeyman, leaving the woman he loves. He vows to remain faithful until he returns to marry her. It first appeared on page sixteen of Friedrich Silcher's collection of popular songs, Volkslieder, gesammelt und für vier Männerstimmen gesetzt, Opus 8, Nr. 12 (folk songs, collected and set for four male voices). The origin of the song, however, is obscure and the original text was not recorded. Silcher mentioned to Ludwig Uhland that the melody was "an old melody from Württemberg".

The song became famous beginning in the mid-19th century. It soon was especially well-liked among the German military as well as among excursion groups and thus was early on considered a patriotic song. It also became popular among German merchant seamen as a capstan shanty, and has been played as a naval quick march since the days of the Imperial German Navy. An early English translation titled "Must I, then? Must I, then? From the town must I, then?" was made by Henry William Dulcken in 1856.

Some "Muss i denn" versions were widely popularized in the 20th century; those interpreted by German-American actress Marlene Dietrich and by French singer Mireille Mathieu and Greek singer Nana Mouskouri deserve mention. The latter also sings English words (though not a translation) to the tune, under the title "There's a Time".

== Lyrics ==
Muss i denn, muss i denn
zum Städtele hinaus, Städtele hinaus,
Und du, mein Schatz, bleibst hier?
Wenn i komm', wenn i komm',
wenn i wiedrum komm', wiedrum komm',
Kehr' i ein, mein Schatz, bei dir.
Kann i glei net allweil bei dir sein,
Han i doch mein Freud' an dir!
Wenn i komm', wenn i komm',
wenn i wiedrum komm', wiedrum komm',
Kehr' i ein, mein Schatz, bei dir.

Wie du weinst, wie du weinst,
Dass i wandere muss, wandere muss,
Wie wenn d' Lieb' jetzt wär' vorbei!
Sind au drauss, sind au drauss
Der Mädele viel, Mädele viel,
Lieber Schatz, i bleib dir treu.
Denk du net, wenn i 'ne Andre seh',
No sei mein' Lieb' vorbei;
Sind au drauss, sind au drauss
Der Mädele viel, Mädele viel,
Lieber Schatz, i bleib dir treu.

Über's Jahr, über's Jahr,
Wenn me Träubele schneid't, Träubele schneid't,
Stell' i hier mi wiedrum ein;
Bin i dann, bin i dann
Dein Schätzele noch, Schätzele noch,
So soll die Hochzeit sein.
Über's Jahr, do ist mein' Zeit vorbei,
Da g'hör' i mein und dein;
Bin i dann, bin i dann
Dein Schätzele noch, Schätzele noch,
So soll die Hochzeit sein.

Translation:

Must I, then, must I, then
to the village must I then, village must I then,
And thou, my dear, stay here?
When I’m back, when I’m back,
When I finally return, finally return,
I’ll come straight to thee, I swear.
Though I can’t be always by thy side,
My joy is always in thee.
When I’m back, when I’m back,
When I finally return, finally return
I shall come home straight to thee.

How thou criest! How thou criest!
'Cause I have to go away, have to go away,
As though our love were now no more.
There are out there, out there,
so many girls, so many girls,
Beloved treasure, I will be true.
Even if I saw another lass,
do not think my love is through:
Let out there, let out there,
let out there be many girls, there be many girls,
Dearest love, I will be true.

In a year, in a year,
When the grapes are good and ripe, grapes are good and ripe,
Then here is where I shall be.
If by then, if by then,
if thy darling still I am, darling still I am
Then married we shall be.
In a year my term is o'er and done,
and then mine and thine I'll be;
If by then, if by then,
if thy darling still I am, darling still I am
Then married we shall be.

== Melody ==
The melody as given in Silcher's publication is as follows:

== Bibliography ==
- Tobias Widmaier: "Von Silcher zu Elvis. Metamorphosen eines schwäbischen 'Volksliedes'". In: Vom Minnesang zur Popakademie. Musikkultur in Baden-Württemberg. Katalog zur Großen Landesaustellung Baden-Württemberg 2010, edited by the Badischen Landesmuseum Karlsruhe. Karlsruhe 2010, pp. 347–50.
- August Holder: "'Muss i denn, muss i denn zum Städtele naus'. Ein schwäbischer Beitrag zur Naturgeschichte der Volksliederdichtung". In: Alemannia 19 (1892), pp. 144–148.
