= Mark Picchiotti =

American DJ

- Also known as: Basstoy; Fondue; Jersey St.; The Absolute
- Origin: Chicago, Illinois, U.S.
- Genres: House; electronic
- Occupations: Record producer; DJ; songwriter; remixer
- Years active: 1991–present
- Labels: Strictly Rhythm; EMI; Blueplate
- Website: markpicchiotti.com

Mark Picchiotti is an American DJ, producer, remixer and songwriter based out of Chicago, Illinois. As a remixer and producer, Picchiotti has amassed 24 number one singles on the Billboard Dance Club Songs chart, and he has remixed such artists as Beyoncé, Katy Perry, Mariah Carey, Rihanna, Daft Punk, The Killers, AC/DC, Florence and The Machine, Amy Grant, Foster The People, Michael Jackson, Madonna, Sia, Sybil, Enriqué Iglesias, and Mary J. Blige. In 2002, he produced and co-wrote the Kylie Minogue single “Give It To Me” for her 8×-Platinum album Fever. Picchiotti was also voted one of the 40 most influential remixers of all time by UK publication Blues & Soul Magazine. His DJ residencies at nightclubs in his hometown of Chicago have included Shelter, Smartbar, Berlin, Crobar, and Medusa's; as well as UK nightclubs Ministry of Sound (London) and Hard Times (Leeds). He continues to travel the globe performing at notable clubs such as Pacha (Portugal) and El Divino (Ibiza). He has also headlined the Sydney Gay and Lesbian Mardi Gras festival and DJed its infamous daytime after-party Laneway.

Mark Picchiotti owns and operates the imprint Blueplate Records, home to his own acts Basstoy, Sandstorm, Fondue, and Streetlife. Picchiotti is also a member of several dance music duos: The Absolute, Nightman, and Doctorz, MD. Mark Picchiotti's music has been described as house, gospel house, soulful house, and progressive house. Additionally, Billboard Magazine says of Mark's music, “His ear for soulful rhythm is matched by a knack for sweet pop melody construction.” In the 1990s, his work with Suzanne Palmer, “There Will Come A Day” and the follow-up single “I Believe”, earned Picchiotti the mantle “Godfather of Gospel House” by music journalists.

== Biography ==
Mark Picchiotti first rose to prominence in 1991 when he produced fellow Chicago artist LaTour's eponymous debut album, spawning the controversial Top 40 hit single “People Are Still Having Sex”. This song would become Picchiotti's first production to reach #1 on Billboard Dance, and it was used by American figure skater Tonya Harding in her program at the 1992 Winter Olympics. LaTour's album also featured “Blue”, a song used in the iconic film Basic Instinct (starring Sharon Stone).

In 1994, using the alias Streetlife, Picchiotti first collaborated with gospel house singer Dana Divine on the song “Love Breakdown”, released on Tribal America Records. As a result of that successful pairing, Dana was featured on one of Mark's biggest productions, “Runnin’” by Basstoy. The single reached #13 on the UK Singles Chart, #1 on the UK Club chart, and #3 on Billboard Dance Club Songs. Dana was again featured on the follow-up single “Turn It Up”, which also saw worldwide success, reaching #1 on Billboard Dance, #1 on the UK's Upfront Music Chart, and #1 on the DMC World Music Chart, and securing a spot as Billboard’s #3 club song of the year.

In 1995, Mark Picchiotti began working with Craig Snider and acclaimed dance music vocalist Suzanne Palmer, spawning “There Will Come A Day” and “I Believe” under the name The Absolute. Regarding their collaboration, Palmer recounts, “As I did more performing, I began to sing commercials for radio and TV, and I came to the attention of Mark Picchiotti, a house music producer from Chicago and his music collaborator, Craig Snider, a jingle writer and producer.” She continues, “That’s how I got my break in dance music.”

In 1997, Picchiotti DJed the release party for Janet Jackson's album Velvet Rope at Sony Pictures Studios in Culver City, CA. That same year, Mark started his own dance music record label, Blueplate Records, on which numerous Billboard-charting and critically acclaimed projects have been released. Notable signings to Blueplate include:

- Bebe Zahara Benet (the season one winner of RuPaul’s Drag Race)
- Kylie Minogue
- Basstoy (whose songs "Magic" and "Turn It Up" reached #1 on Billboard, among other charting hits)
- Alec Sun Drae
- Sybil
- Ralphi Rosario (whose tracks “Everybody Shake It” and “C’mon Get Funky” reached #1 and #2 on Billboard, respectively)
- Eric Kupper & Peyton
- Blueplate Allstars
- Deep Influence
- Sandstorm
- Mark's own gospel act The Absolute featuring dance diva Suzanne Palmer

1998 marked the beginning of Mark's affiliation with Strictly Rhythm, an iconic American dance record label, with a production and distribution deal for physical CDs and vinyl. He also began working with the UK-based duo Lighthouse Family. After having gained the band's respect with his remix of their track “Raincloud”, Mark was asked to work with the band on their following album. Subsequently, he was asked to DJ the Lighthouse Family world tour wrap party in Newcastle, England.

In 1999, Mark was approached by Parlophone/EMI to produce a track for UK-based pop singer Kylie Minogue on her then-upcoming album Light Years. As a result, Picchiotti produced the 2000 club hit “Butterfly” (#14 on Billboard Dance), and he negotiated a deal which allowed him to commission an accompanying remix EP and release it under his Blueplate imprint as a limited run. His work with Minogue continued, and he produced and co-wrote the single “Give It To Me” for her 8×-Platinum album Fever, released in 2002. He also remixed Kylie's 2008 single “All I See” and her 2013 single “Skirt”.

In 2004, while continuing to balance his roles as a DJ and remixer, Mark signed the Leeds-based act Jersey St. and produced their single “Love Will be Our Guide”, released on Defected Records.

In 2009, Picchiotti accepted the request to be the official DJ for reality TV show RuPaul’s Drag Race Winner's Tour, sponsored by Absolut Vodka. Mark signed season one winner Bebe Zahara Benet and produced three of her singles; “I’m The Sh*t”, “Cameroon”, and “Dirty Drums”, all of which were Blueplate releases. Mark toured with the show again following its second season.

The same year, Mark formed a joint venture with the renowned record label Strictly Rhythm, establishing a 50/50 partnership called Blueplate Global. 2009 was also the year that Picchiotti collaborated with UK artist Alec Sun Drae to produce the single “Feel Like Singin’”, a Blueplate Global release. The two continued their collaboration in 2010 when Mark produced the single “Let The Music Guide You”. Later, Mark produced Matt Zarley’s LP Change Begins With Me, which won Outmusic Awards’ Album of the Year in 2012. The title track won Outmusic Awards’ Single of the Year and Rightout TV's Best Song So Far that same year. Commercially, it was an international success; the release spent four weeks at #1 on Eurochart, and two songs from the album, “WTF” and “Trust Me”, charted on Billboard Dance.

In 2013, Mark continued to remix releases from high-profile artists, including the Daft Punk single “Get Lucky” and Enriqué Iglasias’ “Turn The Night Up”, both reaching #1 on Billboard Dance. In 2014, Mark produced the dance version of Amy Grant's “Better Than A Hallelujah”, which was released as a single and was also featured on her album In Motion: The Remixes. Most recently, Picchiotti made a deal with Defected Records for several of his back-catalog titles; his 1998 track “Pump The Boogie” was included as the title track on their Glitterbox compilation of the same name.

2020 was a banner year for Picchiotti. He produced a remix for “Pump The Boogie”, which was released on Glitterbox/Defected, and he collaborated with vocalist Kenyata White to produce the disco single “Love is the Message” (released on Quantize Recordings). In addition, he worked with artist Javi Star (also known as Weezy, the coach of the Phoenix Suns Solar Squad) and his brother, Amani Jae, producing the R&B-influenced track “I Got You”, which was released on the storied Studio 54. Marking his 25-year-long collaborative relationship with dance diva Suzanne Palmer, Mark also produced the disco single “Love Reaction”, a Nervous Records release.

== Discography ==
=== Remixes ===
Artist	Title	Billboard Peak Position
Lords of Acid	"I Must Increase My Bust"	
Rozalla	"Are You Ready to Fly?"	#1 – Dance Club Songs
Prodigy	"Out of Space"	
Yello	"Eccentric Games"	
Heaven 17	"Let Me Go"	
Swains	"Unfulfilled Disorder"	
Culture Beat	"Got To Get It"	#1 – Dance Club Songs
Pet Shop Boys	"Go West"	#1 – Dance Club Songs
NoMan	"Taking It Like A Man"	
Yello	"Do It"	#46 – Dance Club Songs
Right Said Fred	"Bumped"	
Jaki Graham	"Ain't Nobody"	#1 – Dance Club Songs
Jaki Graham	"Absolute E-Sensual"	
Sacred Spirits	"Yeha Noha"	
Whigfield	"Another Day"	
Ruff Nexx Sound System	"Eeny Meeny"	
Sunscreem	"Secrets"	
Club 69	"Sugar Pie Guy"	
Paula Abdul	"My Love Is For Real"	#1 – Dance Club Songs
Madonna	"Bedtime Story"	#1 – Dance Club Songs
Fem 2 Fem	"Where Did Love Go"	
Gena West	"Joy"	
Jamiroquai	"Light Years"	
Andrea Mendez	"Bring Me Love"	
Staxx	"Shout"	
Benz	"Urban City Girl"	
Mark Morrison	"Crazy"	
Lina Santiago	"Feels So Good"	
Shiva	"Let There Be Love"	
Pet Shop Boys	"Se a Vida É"	
The Sacados	"Mas de Lo Que Te Imaginas"	
Claudia Chin	"Reach Out"	
Madonna	"Love Don't Live Here"	
Angel Moraes	"I Like It"	
Hannah Jones	"No One Can Love You More Than Me"	#1 – Dance Club Songs
Livin' Joy	"Where Can I Find Love"	
Eternal	"Don't You Love Me"	
Sam Mollison	"Always On My Mind"	
Lisa Stansfield	"The Real Thing"	
Mary J. Blige	"Love Is All We Need"	#1 – Dance Club Songs
Judy Albanese	"Take Me Over"	
The Real Thing	"Can You Feel The Force"	
Michael Jackson	"HiStory"	
Total Touch	"Do Ba La De"	
Regina	"Day By Day"	
Hanna Jones	"You Only Have To Say You Love Me"	#1 – Dance Club Songs
Lisa Stansfield	"Never, Never Gonna Give You Up"	#1 – Dance Club Songs
Lighthouse Family	Raincloud	
Soul Station	"One Good Reason"	
Alejandro Sanz	"Corazon Partio"	
Karen Ramirez	"Looking For Love"	
Shernette May	"All Right With Me"	
Adamski's Thing	"Intravenus Venus"	
Kim English	"Tomorrow"	
Mass Syndicate	"You Don't Know"	
The Messengers	"Free"	
M People	"Movin' On Up"	#1 – Dance Club Songs
Catapila	Void	
Angel Moon	"He's All I Want"	
All Saints	"Lady Marmalade"	
Kele Le Roc	"My Love"	
JD & Mariah Carey	"Sweetheart" (feat. JD)	#45 – R&B/Hip-Hop Radio Airplay
Geri Haliwell	"Look At Me"	
Gary Barlow	"Stronger"	
Andrea Grant	"Hurting All Over"	
David's Daughter	"Dreaming Of Loving You"	
Jungle Brothers	"Get Down"	
S Club 7	"Two In A Million"	
Fused	"Pleasure & Pain"	
Soul Searcher	"Do It To Me Again"	
Samantha	"Gotta Tell You"	
Saint Mark	"My Brother's A DJ"	
Heather Small	"Holding On"	
Sebastian Rogers	"Read It And Weep"	
Thunderbugs	"Better Like This"	
Erasure	"Freedom"	
Bette Midler	"In These Shoes"	
Hear-Say	"The Way To Your Love"	
Tamara Walker	"Angel Eyes"	
Enriqué Iglesias	"Hero"	#1 – Dance Club Songs
Barthezz	"Infected"	
Soluna	"For All Time"	
Sinister	"Chimira"	
Anny	"White Lipstick Girl"	
Melodi Brown	"Naked"	
t.A.T.u.	"All The Things She Said"	
Pat Hodges	"Love Revolution"	
Seiko	"Just For Tonight"	
Seiko	"Ave Maria"	
Lene	"It's Your Duty"	
Marie Miller	"Playground"	
Marie Miller	"Can't Slow Down"	
Esthero	"Fastlane"	
New Order	"Guilt Is A Useless Emotion"	
Head Automatica	"Beating Heart Baby"	
DJ Tekin	"Wait Forever"	
Kaci Brown	"Unbelievable"	
Shinedown	"Save Me"	
LMC	"Give What You Give"	
Missy Elliot	"We Run This"	
Rob Thomas	"Ever The Same"	
Rosario Dawson	"Out Tonight" (Rent OST)	
James Kakande	"You You You"	
Shapeshifters	"New Day"	
Enriqué Iglesias	"Somebody's Me"	
Sia	"The Girl You Lost Cocaine To"	#8 – Dance Club Songs
Lena	"I Can Hear The Money"	
Quincy McQ	"Beautiful Song"	
Elle Scott	"Take A Trip"	
ATFC feat. Peyton	"Beautiful"	
Loveless feat. Amanda Wilson	"Found A Miracle"	
Erick Morillo Project	"Jazz It Up"	
George Michael	"Faith"	#17 – Dance Club Songs
Jodie Aysha	"So Typical"	
Kylie Minogue	"All I See"	#3 – Dance Club Songs
Bryan Anthony	"Worked Up"	
Win	"Kiss and Tell"	
Jada	"Beautiful"	
Ralphi Rosario	"Menergy"	
Kimberley Locke	"I Can't Make You Love Me"	
New Kids On The Block	"Single"	
AC/DC	"Rock N Roll Train"	#30 – Dance Club Songs
LaBelle	"Superlover"	
Michelle Williams	"The Greatest"	#1 – Dance Club Songs
Beyoncé	"If I Were A Boy"	#2 – Dance Club Songs
Beyoncé	"Single Ladies"	#1 – Dance Club Songs #1 – Hot Dance Airplay
Sneaky Sound System	"I Love It"	
The Doors vs The Trammps	"Light My Disco Inferno"	
Deep Influence	"Rise"	
Matt Zarley	"See a Chance"	
The Killers	"Human"	#1 – Dance Club Songs
Solange	"T.O.N.Y."	#1 – Dance Club Songs
Peyton vs. Kupper	"Here I Am"	
Beyoncé	"Smash Into You"	
Anabel Romero	"Warning"	
Temper Trap	"Sweet Disposition"	
Lolene	"Rich"	
Booka Shade	"Bad Love"	
VV Brown	"Shark In The Water"	
Ralphi Rosario	"C'mon Get Funky"	#2 – Dance Club Songs
Lisa McClowry	"Born Twice"	
Matt Zarley	"Where Did You Come From"	
Rihanna	"Rockstar 101"	#2 – Dance Club Songs
Raul Rincon	"Just A Mash Affair"	
Sharon Little	"Shake and Shiver"	
Lisa McClowry	"Waiting For You"	
Florence and The Machine	"Dog Days Are Over"	#4 – Dance Club Songs
Beth Ditto	"I Write The Book"	
Hot Rod	"Dance With Me"	
Florence and The Machine	"Shake It"	
Depeche Mode	"Enjoy The Silence"	
Crystal Method feat. Martha Reeves	"I'm Not Leaving"	
Havana Brown	"We Run The Night"	
Foster The People	"Color The Walls (Don't Stop)"	
Toni Braxton	"I Heart You"	#1 – Dance Club Songs
Gravitonas	"Call Your Name"	
Tom Connan	"Beautiful Day"	
Passion Pit	"Take A Walk"	
Official Hank	"Gonna Get Better"	
Sheena Rose	"Make Me Over"	
Kylie Minogue	"Skirt"	#1 – Dance Club Songs #31 – Hot Dance/Electronic Songs
Enriqué Iglasias	"Turn The Night Up"	#1 – Dance Club Songs #8 – Hot Dance/Electronic Songs
Daft Punk	"Get Lucky"	#1 – Dance Club Songs #1 – Hot Dance/Electronic Songs
Strikeforce	"One Day At A Time"	
Katy Perry	"Birthday"	#1 – Dance Club Songs
Andy Compton & Rogiers	"Another Lover"	
Sam Smith	"Stay With Me"	#37 – Dance Club Songs
Flaunt	"Codon (Dipped in Ecstasy)"	
Mary J. Blige	"Therapy"	
Jason Walker	"Wild Joy"	
Mary Wilson	"Time To Move On"	#17 – Dance Club Songs #49 – Hot Dance/Electronic Songs
Shelley Harland	"Somebody"	
Beyoncé	"Formation"	#24 – Dance Club Songs
Discorocks	"Wanted"	
TeamMate	"Nothing's Ever Over"	#48 – Dance Club Songs
Philip George & Dragonette	"Feel This Way"	#5 – Dance Club Songs
Mike Taylor	"Body High"	#6 – Dance Club Songs
Tinashe	"Superlover"	
Amy Grant feat. Mark Picchiotti	"Better Than A Hallelujah"	#5 – Top Dance/Electronic Albums #8 – Dance Club Songs
Matt Zarley feat. Mark Picchiotti	"Somebody 4 Everybody"	
Mark Picchiotti	"Pump the Boogie"	
Jules Liesl	"Cherry"	#17 – Dance/Mix Show Airplay

=== Productions ===
Artist	Release	Title	Billboard Peak Position
Boom! Tribe	Mangous Ye	"Mangous Ye"	
LaTour	LaTour	"People Are Still Having Sex"	#1 – Dance Club Songs #35 – Hot 100 #49 – Radio Songs
LaTour	LaTour	"Allen's Got a New Hi-Fi"	
LaTour	LaTour	"Involved"	
LaTour	LaTour	"Cold"	#25 – Dance Club Songs
LaTour	LaTour	"Fantasy Soldiers"	
LaTour	LaTour	"Amazing You"	
LaTour	LaTour	Laurie Monster"	
LaTour	LaTour	"Psych"	
LaTour	LaTour	"Dark Sunglasses"	
LaTour	LaTour	"Blue" (included in Basic Instinct soundtrack)	#43 – Dance Club Songs
LaTour	Home On The Range	"Following You"	
LaTour	Home On The Range	"Craziaskowboi"	#36 – Dance Club Songs
LaTour	Home On The Range	"Hypnomania"	#20 – Dance Club Songs
LaTour	Home On The Range	"The Cure Is Found"	
LaTour	Home On The Range	"Keep Your Eye on the Quiet One"	
LaTour	Home On The Range	"Don't Jump"	
LaTour	Home On The Range	"Run Away With Me"	
LaTour	Home On The Range	"'E'"	#46 – Dance Club Songs
LaTour	Home On The Range	"Jungle Beats"	
LaTour	Home On The Range	"I'm So Afraid of You"	
LaTour	Home On The Range	"Craziaskowboi (Remix Album Edit)"	
LaTour	Home On The Range	"Don't Jump (Remix 7")"	
Plantlife	Float	"Float (Suspended Mix)"	
Plantlife	Float	"Float (Generate And Propel Mix)"	
Plantlife	Float	"Float (Translucent Mix)"	
T. Bristol and M. Picchiotti Present Nightman	Paul's Pain	"Paul's Pain"	#6 – Dance Club Songs
Lorraine Cato	I Was Made To Love You	"I Was Made To Love You (Mark!s Full On Vocal)"	
Lorraine Cato	I Was Made To Love You	"I Was Made To Love You (Mark!s Shelter Dub)"	
Mark Picchiotti Presents Streetlife (feat. Dana Divine)	Love Breakdown	"Love Breakdown"	
The Absolute (feat. Suzanne Palmer)	There Will Come A Day	"There Will Come A Day (Epic Gospel House)"	
The Absolute (feat. Suzanne Palmer)	There Will Come A Day	"There Will Come A Day (Half Tab)"	
The Absolute (feat. Suzanne Palmer)	There Will Come A Day	"There Will Come A Day (Black Lozenge)"	
The Absolute (feat. Suzanne Palmer)	There Will Come A Day	"There Will Come A Day (Traditional Flavour)"	
Shinehouse (feat. Tony Ransom)	Heaven	"Heaven (Full On Vocal Mix)"	
Shinehouse (feat. Tony Ransom)	Heaven	"Heaven (Celestial Signs Mix)"	
Shinehouse (feat. Tony Ransom)	Heaven	"Heaven (Morning Key Mix)"	
Shinehouse (feat. Tony Ransom)	Heaven	"Heaven (Straight To Hell Mix)"	
Sybil	Why	"Why"	
Sybil	Why	"Why (Lisa Marie Vocal Experience)"	
Sybil	Why	"Why (Mark!s Anthem Journey Vocal)"	
Sybil	Why	"Why (Mark!s Anthem Edit)"	
Sybil	Why	"Why (Mark!s Non-Stop Dub)"	
Mark Picchiotti presents Dino V.	No More Pain	"No More Pain"	#27 – Dance Club Songs
Marcia Hines	Time of Our Lives	"Time of Our Lives"	
Marcia Hines	Time of Our Lives	"Which Way Is Up"	
Marcia Hines	Time of Our Lives	"I Got the Music in Me"	
Future Force	What You Want	"What You Want"	
Future Force	What You Want	"What You Want (Mark!s Massive Vocal)	
Future Force	What You Want	"What You Want (Mark!s Epic Vocal)"	
Future Force	Puttin' A Rush On Me	"Puttin' A Rush On Me"	
Future Force	Puttin' A Rush On Me	"Puttin' A Rush On Me (Mark!s Epic Vocal)"	
Future Force	Puttin' A Rush On Me	"Puttin' A Rush On Me (Mark!s Shelter Dub)"	
Future Force	Puttin' A Rush On Me	"Puttin' A Rush On Me (Mark!s Puttin' A Rub On Dub)"	
The Absolute feat. Suzanne Palmer	I Believe	"I Believe"	
The Absolute feat. Suzanne Palmer	I Believe	"I Believe (Mark!s Full On Gospel Mix)"	
The Absolute feat. Suzanne Palmer	I Believe	"I Believe (Lift You Up Vocal)"	
The Absolute feat. Suzanne Palmer	I Believe	"I Believe (Mark!s Full On Gospel Mix)"	
The Absolute feat. Suzanne Palmer	I Believe	"I Believe (Never Bring You Down Dub)"	
Gary Barlow	Love Won't Wait	"Cuddly Toy (Lush Vocal)"	
Gary Barlow	Cuddly Toy	"Cuddly Toy (Dumb And Funky Dub)"	
Gary Barlow	Cuddly Toy	"Cuddly Toy (Steal The Disco)"	
Gary Barlow	Cuddly Toy	"Cuddly Toy (Lush Vocal)"	
Gary Barlow	Cuddly Toy	"Cuddly Toy (Lush Dub)"	
Sandstorm	The Return Of Nothing	"The Return Of Nothing"	#4 – Dance Club Songs
Sandstorm	Oomba	"Oomba"	
Sandstorm	Oomba	"Oomba (Trancid)"	
Basstoy	Runnin'	"Runnin'"	#1 – Dance Club Songs
Basstoy	Runnin' 2018	"Runnin' 2018"	#14 – Dance Club Songs #45 – Hot Dance/Electronic Songs
Basstoy	Runnin' 2018	"Runnin' 2018 (Redux Radio Edit)"	#14 – Dance Club Songs #45 – Hot Dance/Electronic Songs
Basstoy	Runnin' 2018	"Runnin' 2018 (Redux Vocal)"	#14 – Dance Club Songs #45 – Hot Dance/Electronic Songs
Basstoy	Runnin' 2018	"Runnin' 2018 (Redux Dub)"	#14 – Dance Club Songs #45 – Hot Dance/Electronic Songs
Basstoy	Runnin' 2018 (Remixes, Pt. 1)	"Runnin' 2018 (Festival Mix)"	#14 – Dance Club Songs #45 – Hot Dance/Electronic Songs
Basstoy	Runnin' 2018 (Remixes, Pt. 1)	"Runnin' 2018 (Festival Dub)"	#14 – Dance Club Songs #45 – Hot Dance/Electronic Songs
Basstoy	Runnin' 2018 (Remixes, Pt. 1)	"Runnin' 2018 (Festival Radio Edit)"	#14 – Dance Club Songs #45 – Hot Dance/Electronic Songs
Kylie Minogue	Fever	"Give It To Me"	
Kylie Minogue	Light Years	"Butterfly"	#14 – Dance Club Songs
Kylie Minogue	Light Years	"Under The Influence"	
The Absolute feat. Suzanne Palmer	Fallen Angel	"Fallen Angel"	
Mark Picchiotti Presents Jersey St.	Love Will Be Our Guide	"Love Will Be Our Guide"	
Mark Picchiotti Presents Sybil	As A Child	"As A Child"	
Basstoy	Turn It Up	"Turn It Up"	#1 – Dance Club Songs
Basstoy	Turn It Up	"Turn It Up (Mark!s Radio Edit)"	#1 – Dance Club Songs
Basstoy	Turn It Up	"Turn It Up (Mark!s Big Room Dub)"	#1 – Dance Club Songs
Basstoy	Turn It Up	"Turn It Up (Mark!s Club Vocal)"	#1 – Dance Club Songs
Blueplate Allstars	Be Your Lady	"Be Your Lady"	
Mark Picchiotti feat. Dana Divine	So Sweet	"So Sweet"	
Mark Picchiotti feat. Dana Divine	So Sweet	"So Sweet (Mark Picchiotti Classic Mix)"	
Mark Picchiotti feat. Dana Divine	So Sweet	"So Sweet (Mark Picchiotti Be Bop Dub)"	
Mark Picchiotti feat. Dana Divine	So Sweet	"So Sweet (Mark Picchiotti Radio Edit)"	
The Absolute feat. Suzanne Palmer	I Believe 2009	"I Believe 2009"	
Mark Picchiotti feat. Alec Sun Drae	Feel Like Singin'	"Feel Like Singin'"	
Mark Picchiotti feat. Alec Sun Drae	Let the Music Guide You	"Let the Music Guide You"	
Lauren Hildebrandt feat. Basstoy	Devil	"Devil"	
Matt Zarley	Change Begins With Me	"WTF"	#21 – Dance Club Songs
Matt Zarley	Change Begins With Me	"Trust Me"	#26 – Dance Club Songs
Mark Picchiotti feat. Kenyata White	Rumors	"Rumors"	
Mark Picchiotti feat. Rufus Proffit	Shelter	"Shelter"	
Mark Picchiotti & Craig J. Snider feat. Dana Divine	Crazy Love	"Crazy Love"	
Mark Picchiotti feat. Kenyata White	Love Is The Message	"Love Is The Message"	
Mark Picchiotti feat. Javi Star & Amani Jae	I Got You	"I Got You"	
Mark Picchiotti feat. Suzanne Palmer	Love Reaction	"Love Reaction"	

== See also ==
- List of artists who reached number one on the U.S. Dance chart
