= Technodon Live =

Live album by Yellow Magic Orchestra
- Released: August 25, 1993
- Recorded: June 11, 1993
- Venue: Tokyo Dome, Tokyo Dome City, Bunkyo, Tokyo
- Genre: Techno
- Length: 1:10:12
- Label: EMI Music Japan, Eastworld

Yellow Magic Orchestra chronology
Technodon (1993)	Technodon Live (1993)	Live at Budokan 1980 (1993)

Technodon Live is a live album by Yellow Magic Orchestra. It was recorded on the band's second and last show at the Tokyo Dome in 1993, and is the only full music album of the band's Technodon era. It is composed mostly of Technodon material (although this album lacks "Nostalgia", "Silence of Time", "O.K." and "Pocketful of Rainbows", Technodon was played live in its entirety) with a few songs from Yellow Magic Orchestra and Solid State Survivor performed in the Technodon style. During the live performance, special audio effects were performed by Goh Hotoda, who also mixed both Technodon & this album, and computer graphics created by Daisaburo Harada were projected on a screen on the back of the stage. The album peaked at number 12 on Oricon Albums Chart.

== Track listing ==
All tracks arranged by ~~YMO~~.

No.	Title	Lyrics	Music	Original Album	Length
1.	"Be a Superman"	Ryuichi Sakamoto, Yukihiro Takahashi	Sakamoto, Takahashi	Technodon	5:42
2.	"Nanga Def?"	Sakamoto	Haruomi Hosono, Sakamoto, Takahashi	Technodon	5:15
3.	"Floating Away"	William Gibson	Hosono, Takahashi	Technodon	6:48
4.	"Dolphinicity"	Instrumental	Hosono	Technodon	5:14
5.	"I Tre Merli"	Instrumental	Hosono, Sakamoto, Takahashi	Technodon	6:15
6.	"Hi-Tech Hippies"	Hosono, Sakamoto, Takahashi	Hosono, Sakamoto, Takahashi	Technodon	4:35
7.	"Castalia"	Instrumental	Sakamoto	Solid State Survivor	5:29
8.	"Behind the Mask"	Chris Mosdell	Sakamoto, Takahashi	Solid State Survivor	5:39
9.	"La Femme Chinoise" (中国女 Chūgoku Onna)	Mosdell	Takahashi	Yellow Magic Orchestra	4:58
10.	"Waterford"	Instrumental	Sakamoto, Takahashi	Technodon	5:43
11.	"Chance; Rydeen Ending" (雷電 Raidīn)	Instrumental	Sakamoto; Takahashi	Technodon; Solid State Survivor	5:00; 0:31
12.	"Tong Poo" (東風 Ton Pū)	Instrumental	Sakamoto	Yellow Magic Orchestra	5:21
13.	"Firecracker"	Instrumental	Martin Denny	Yellow Magic Orchestra	3:36
Total length:					70:12

== Personnel ==
- Haruomi Hosono – Bass, Keyboards, Vocals
- Ryuichi Sakamoto – Keyboards, Vocals
- Yukihiro Takahashi – Drums, Percussion, Vocals
- Goh Hotoda – Special Audio Effects

=== Sampled from the originals ===
- William S. Burroughs – Voice on "Be a Superman" & "I Tre Merli"
- Ruriko Kamiya – Voice on "Be a Superman"
- William Gibson – Voice on "Floating Away"
- Hirofumi Tokutake – Guitar on "Floating Away"
- John C. Lilly – Voice on "Dolphinicity"
- Tomoko Nunoi (née Ebe) – Sexy Voice (Vocals) on "La Femme Chinoise"
