= Peter Rabbit (disambiguation) =

Peter Rabbit is a fictional children's book character by Beatrix Potter.

Peter Rabbit may also refer to:

- The Tale of Peter Rabbit, 1902 tale by Beatrix Potter
- "Peter Rabbit", a 1966 single by Dee Jay and the Runaways
- Peter Rabbit (TV series), 2012 TV series
- Peter Rabbit (film), 2018 film
- Peter Rabbit, a character in the children's books by Thornton W. Burgess
- Peter Rabbit, comic strip by Harrison Cady
- Peter Musñgi, a Filipino broadcaster also known under the nickname Peter Rabbit
- Peter Douthit, poet who wrote under the name Peter Rabbit
- "Little Peter Rabbit", a children's song sung to the melody of "Battle Hymn of the Republic"

== See also ==
- Peter Rabbit and Tales of Beatrix Potter a.k.a. The Tales of Beatrix Potter, 1971 ballet film
- The New Adventures of Peter Rabbit, 1995 American animated direct-to-video film produced by Golden Films
- The World of Peter Rabbit and Friends, 1990s anthology TV series
