= G.I. Blues (soundtrack) =

Soundtrack album by Elvis Presley
- Released: September 23, 1960
- Recorded: April 27 – May 6, 1960
- Studio: RCA (Hollywood, California)
- Genre: Pop, rock and roll
- Length: 26:35
- Label: RCA Victor

Elvis Presley chronology
Elvis Is Back! (1960)	G.I. Blues (1960)	His Hand in Mine (1960)

Singles from G.I. Blues
- 1. "G.I. Blues" Released: December 1960; 2. "Wooden Heart" Released: March 1961

Professional ratings
Review scores
Source	Rating
AllMusic	3.5/5 stars
MusicHound	3/5 stars
Rough Guides	2/5 stars
Uncut	4/5 stars

G.I. Blues is the third soundtrack album and seventh (overall) album by American singer and musician Elvis Presley, released by RCA Victor in mono and stereo, LPM/LSP 2256, in October 1960. It is the soundtrack to the 1960 film of the same name in which he starred. Recording sessions took place on April 27 and 28 and May 6, 1960, at RCA Victor Studio C and Radio Recorders in Hollywood, California. The album topped the Billboard Top Pop Album chart. It was certified gold on March 13, 1963, and platinum on March 27, 1992, by the Recording Industry Association of America. The album remained at the No. 1 spot for ten weeks.

== Content ==
Music on this album comprised songs that had appeared in the film of the same name. The song "Wooden Heart" was released as a single in the United Kingdom, where it was number one for six weeks. It also was number one in Australia. In the United States, Joe Dowell recorded a cover version of "Wooden Heart" that topped the Billboard Hot 100. RCA Victor later released "Wooden Heart" by Presley as the B-side of a single twice, once in 1964 on the back of a reissue of "Blue Christmas", and again on the flip side of a belated issue in 1965 of "Puppet on a String" from the film Girl Happy. Four songs from this album appear on the 1995 soundtrack compilation Command Performances: The Essential 60s Masters II: "G.I. Blues", "Wooden Heart", "Shoppin' Around", and "Doin' the Best I Can".

Due to copyright reasons, the European version of the soundtrack album and film substitutes the opening track "Tonight Is So Right for Love" with the song "Tonight's All Right for Love", adapted from a melody by 19th century waltz-king Johann Strauss II, Tales from the Vienna Woods. The melody for "Tonight Is So Right for Love" was taken directly from a barcarolle composed by Jacques Offenbach, one of Strauss's contemporaries. An American release of "Tonight's All Right for Love" did not occur until it appeared on the compilation album Elvis: A Legendary Performer Volume 1 in 1974. The version of "Blue Suede Shoes" used on the soundtrack is a new recording of the song Presley first recorded in 1956 and is one of only a few songs that Presley re-recorded in a studio setting during his career, "Love Letters" being another prominent example.

The G.I. Blues soundtrack album was nominated for two Grammy Awards in 1960 in the categories Best Sound Track Album Or Recording Of Original Cast From A Motion Picture Or Television and Best Vocal Performance Album, Male.

== Reissues ==
RCA's first reissue of G.I. Blues on compact disc in 1988 contained an alternate version of "Tonight Is So Right for Love" as a bonus track. In 1997, RCA reissued the album on CD again, adding eight outtakes from the recording session as bonus tracks. Two songs were previously released, the acoustic version of "Big Boots" appearing on the posthumous 1978 album Elvis Sings for Children and Grown-Ups Too, and the substitute "Tonight Is So Right for Love". In 2012 G.I. Blues was released on the Follow That Dream label in a 7-inch digi-pack edition featuring a booklet and two CDs containing the original album tracks and numerous alternate takes. A follow-up album, Café Europa, which also contained a booklet and two CDs was released in 2013. This album featured more alternate takes of the G.I. Blues soundtrack.

== Track listing ==
=== Original release ===
Side one
No.	Title	Writer(s)	Recording date	Length
1.	"Tonight Is So Right for Love"	Abner Silver, Sid Wayne, Joe Lilley	April 27, 1960	2:14
2.	"What's She Really Like"	Abner Silver and Sid Wayne	April 28, 1960	2:17
3.	"Frankfort Special"	Sid Wayne and Sherman Edwards	May 6, 1960	2:58
4.	"Wooden Heart"	Ben Weisman, Fred Wise, Kay Twomey, Bert Kaempfert	April 28, 1960	2:03
5.	"G.I. Blues"	Sid Tepper and Roy C. Bennett	April 27, 1960	2:36

Side two
No.	Title	Writer(s)	Recording date	Length
1.	"Pocketful of Rainbows"	Ben Weisman and Fred Wise	May 6, 1960	2:35
2.	"Shoppin' Around"	Aaron Schroeder, Sid Tepper, Roy C. Bennett	May 6, 1960	2:24
3.	"Big Boots"	Sid Wayne and Sherman Edwards	May 6, 1960	1:31
4.	"Didja' Ever"	Sid Wayne and Sherman Edwards	April 27, 1960	2:36
5.	"Blue Suede Shoes"	Carl Perkins	April 28, 1960	2:07
6.	"Doin' the Best I Can"	Doc Pomus and Mort Shuman	April 27, 1960	3:10

=== 1997 CD reissue bonus tracks ===
Tracks 1–11 are from the original release
No.	Title	Writer(s)	Recording date	Length
12.	"Tonight's All Right For Love"	Sid Wayne, Abner Silver, Johann Strauss II	May 6, 1960	1:21
13.	"Big Boots" (fast version)	Sid Wayne and Sherman Edwards	May 6, 1960	1:14
14.	"Shoppin' Around" (alternate take 11)	Aaron Schroeder, Sid Tepper, Roy C. Bennett	April 27, 1960	2:15
15.	"Frankfort Special" (fast version take 2)	Sid Wayne and Sherman Edwards	April 27, 1960	2:25
16.	"Pocketful of Rainbows" (alternate take 2)	Ben Weisman and Fred Wise	April 28, 1960	2:47
17.	"Didja' Ever" (alternate take 1)	Sid Wayne and Sherman Edwards	April 27, 1960	2:42
18.	"Big Boots" (acoustic version)	Sid Wayne and Sherman Edwards	May 6, 1960	0:58
19.	"What's She Really Like" (alternate take 7)	Abner Silver and Sid Wayne	April 28, 1960	2:24
20.	"Doin' the Best I Can" (alternate take 9)	Doc Pomus and Mort Shuman	April 27, 1960	3:17

=== 2012 Follow That Dream release ===
Disc 1

The Original Album
No.	Title	Length
1.	"Tonight Is So Right for Love"	2:15
2.	"What's She Really Like"	2:19
3.	"Frankfort Special"	2:57
4.	"Wooden Heart"	2:05
5.	"G.I. Blues"	2:41
6.	"Pocketful of Rainbows"	2:36
7.	"Shoppin' Around"	2:24
8.	"Big Boots"	1:33
9.	"Didja' Ever"	2:38
10.	"Blue Suede Shoes"	2:08
11.	"Doin' the Best I Can"	3:16
12.	"Tonight's All Right for Love" (alternate song)	1:26

Bonus Songs
No.	Title	Length
13.	"Shoppin' Around" (version #1)	2:17
14.	"Frankfort Special" (fast version)	2:19
15.	"Big Boots" (fast version)	1:22
16.	"Pocketful of Rainbows" (version #1, take 12)	2:26
17.	"Pocketful of Rainbows" (version #1, take 12)	2:26
18.	"Big Boots" (medium tempo version)	1:04

First Takes
No.	Title	Length
19.	"Tonight Is So Right for Love" (Barcarolle from The Tales Of Hoffman, instrumental)	2:18
20.	"Tonight Is So Right for Love" (takes 1-2)	3:07
21.	"What's She Really Like" (takes 1-5)	6:25
22.	"Frankfort Special" (fast version takes 1-2)	3:48
23.	"Wooden Heart" (take 1)	2:13
24.	"Pocketful of Rainbows" (version #1, takes 1-2)	4:52
25.	"Shoppin' Around" (version #1, take 1)	2:34
26.	"Big Boots" (fast version, takes 1-2)	1:48
27.	"Big Boots" (slow version, take 1)	1:39
28.	"Didja' Ever" (take 1)	2:59
29.	"Tonight's All Right for Love" (take 1)	1:24
30.	"Doin' The Best I Can" (takes 1-3)	5:11

Disc 2

April 27–28 Sessions
No.	Title	Length
1.	"Pocketful of Rainbows" (version #1, take 3)	2:43
2.	"Shoppin' Around" (instrumental take 4)	1:46
3.	"Shoppin' Around" (version #1, takes 2-4)	3:20
4.	"Shoppin' Around" (version #1, take 5)	2:26
5.	"Doin' The Best I Can" (takes 4-7)	2:23
6.	"Doin' The Best I Can" (takes 8-9)	3:44
7.	"G.I. Blues" (takes 2-4)	3:45
8.	"G.I. Blues" (take 5)	2:43
9.	"Tonight Is So Right for Love" (take 3)	2:30
10.	"Tonight Is So Right for Love" (take 4)	2:36
11.	"Tonight Is So Right for Love" (takes 5-7)	5:28
12.	"Frankfort Special" (fast version, takes 3-7)	6:51
13.	"Frankfort Special" (fast version, take 8)	2:42
14.	"Big Boots" (fast version, take 3)	1:36
15.	"Big Boots" (fast version, take 4)	1:41
16.	"Big Boots" (slow version, takes 2-3)	2:26
17.	"What's She Really Like" (takes 6-7)	3:32
18.	"What's She Really Like" (takes 8-11)	6:10
19.	"What's She Really Like" (takes 12-13)	3:02
20.	"Pocketful of Rainbows" (version #1, takes 4-7)	5:36
21.	"Pocketful of Rainbows" (version #1, take 8)	2:51
22.	"Pocketful of Rainbows" (version #1, take 9)	2:49
23.	"Pocketful of Rainbows" (version #1, take 10)	2:48
24.	"Wooden Heart" (takes 2-4M)	3:53

=== 2013 Café Europa Follow That Dream release ===
Disc 1

Master Takes - Remixed
No.	Title	Length
1.	"Didja' Ever" (take 2 CO-sp replaced master)	2:54
2.	"Doin' The Best I Can" (take 13/M)	3:32
3.	"G. I. Blues" (take 7/M + insert ending takes 8-10/M)	4:36
4.	"Tonight Is So Right For Love" (takes 10-11/M)	4:16
5.	"What's She Really Like" (takes 17-19/M + insert takes 20-22/M)	8:11
6.	"Blue Suede Shoes" (take 1/M)	2:14
7.	"Wooden Heart" (take 4/M)	2:09
8.	"Shoppin'Around" (remake, takes 6-7/M)	2:57
9.	"Pocketful Of Rainbows" (remake, take 2/M)	2:36
10.	"Frankfort Special" (remake, takes 9-10/M)	4:29
11.	"Tonight's All Right For Love" (take 10/M + insert takes 1-2/M)	3:22
12.	"Big Boots" (slow version, take 4/M)	1:40
13.	"Big Boots" (slow version, remake, insert takes 2-4/M)	1:55

Outtakes
No.	Title	Length
14.	"Shoppin' Around" (version 1, takes 6-10)	4:59
15.	"Doin'The Best I Can" (takes 10-12)	4:38
16.	"G.I. Blues" (take 6)	2:47
17.	"Tonight Is So Right For Love" (take 8)	2:30
18.	"Tonight Is So Right For Love" (take 9)	2:29
19.	"Big Boots" (fast version, takes 6-5)	1:40
20.	"What's She Really Like" (takes 14-16)	4:13
21.	"Pocketful Of Rainbows" (version 1, takes 11,13-14)	3:19
22.	"Pocketful Of Rainbows" (version 1, takes 15-16)	3:31
23.	"Pocketful Of Rainbows" (version 1, take 17)	2:50

Disc 2

Outtakes continues
No.	Title	Length
1.	"Pocketful Of Rainbows" (version 1, takes 18-20)	6:18
2.	"Pocketful Of Rainbows" (version 1, takes 21-25)	5:04
3.	"Pocketful Of Rainbows" (version 1, takes 26-28)	4:45
4.	"Big Boots" (medium tempo version, take 1)	1:10
5.	"Shoppin' Around" (remake, takes 1-2)	2:47
6.	"Shoppin' Around" (remake, takes 3-5)	3:24
7.	"Pocketful Of Rainbows" (remake, takes 1-3)	4:11
8.	"Frankfort Special" (fast version, takes 9-12/fs + remake takes 1-5)	9:11
9.	"Frankfort Special" (remake, takes 6-8)	5:38
10.	"Tonight's All Right For Love" (takes 2-5)	4:05
11.	"Tonight's All Right For Love" (take 6)	1:27
12.	"Tonight's All Right For Love" (takes 7-8)	2:02
13.	"Tonight's All Right For Love" (takes 9,11,12)	2:46
14.	"Tonight's All Right For Love" (takes 14-15)	2:03
15.	"Tonight's All Right For Love" (takes 16-17)	2:15
16.	"Big Boots" (slow version, remake takes 1-6 + insert take 1)	4:50

Bonus Tracks
No.	Title	Length
17.	"Tonight¹s All Right For Love" (Tales from the Vienna Woods, instrumental)	2:26
18.	"Wooden Heart" (Grammafunken Version, instrumental)	1:19
19.	"Whistling Blues" (Instrumental)	3:26

== Personnel ==
- Elvis Presley – vocals, acoustic rhythm guitar on "Shoppin' Around" (alt. version recorded April 27)
- The Jordanaires – backing vocals
- Scotty Moore – rhythm guitar, lead guitar on "Frankfort Special"
- Tiny Timbrell – lead guitar, mandolin
- Neal Matthews Jr. – electric bass, guitar
- Jimmie Haskell – accordion
- Hoyt Hawkins – tambourine
- Dudley Brooks – piano
- Ray Siegel – double bass, tuba
- D. J. Fontana – drums
- Frank Bode – drums on April 27 and April 28
- Bernie Mattinson – drums on May 6

== Charts ==
Chart (1960-1961)	Peak position
Billboard Pop Albums (Billboard 200)	1
Italian Albums (HitParadeItalia)	1
UK Albums Chart	1

Chart (1977)	Peak position
Australia (Kent Music Report)	71

== Certifications ==
Region	Certification	Certified units/sales
United Kingdom (BPI) original release	Silver	250,000
United Kingdom (BPI) 2010 rerelease	Silver	60,000^{‡}
United States (RIAA)	Platinum	1,000,000^{^}
^{^} Shipments figures based on certification alone.^{‡} Sales+streaming figures based on certification alone.

== Awards ==
Year	Award type	Categories	Results	Ref.
1961	Grammy Awards	Best Sound Track Album or Recording of Original Cast From a Motion Picture or Television	Nominated	
