= G.I. Blues (Elvis Presley song) =

Single by Elvis Presley

from the album G.I. Blues
- A-side: "Wooden Heart"; "G.I. Blues"; (selected countries)
- Released: 1961
- Recorded: April 27 (possibly 28), 1960
- Length: 2:36
- Songwriters: Sid Tepper; Roy C. Bennett

"G.I. Blues" is a song first recorded by Elvis Presley as part of the soundtrack for his 1960 motion picture G.I. Blues. Its first LP release was on the eponymous soundtrack album in October 1960.

In some countries it was also released on a single or an eponymous EP.

== Writing and recording history ==
The song was written by Sid Tepper and Roy C. Bennett.

Presley recorded it during the soundtrack recordings for the Paramount movie G.I' Blues at the RCA Studio in Hollywood on April 27–28, 1960. Takes 7 and 10 were spliced together to form the vocal master.

== Track listings ==
7-inch single (Victor SS 1251, Japan, 1960)

1. "G.I. Blues" (2:35)
2. "Doin' The Best I Can" (3:10)

7-inch single (Italy, Israel)

1. "Wooden Heart"
2. "G.I. Blues"

7-inch EP (France, Israel)

1. "Tonight's All Right For Love"
2. "Wooden Heart"
3. "G.I. Blues"
4. "Didja' Ever"

== Charts ==
| Chart (1961) | Peak position |
|---|---|
| Belgium (Wallonia) | 8 |
| Italy (Musica e dischi) | 17 |
