= Technodon =

1993 studio album by Yellow Magic Orchestra

Studio album by ~~YMO~~
- Released: May 26, 1993
- Recorded: February 2, 1992 – January 31, 1993
- Studios: Skyline Studio, Midtown Manhattan, Manhattan, New York City; Victor Studio, Aoyama, Minato, Tokyo
- Genres: Synth-pop; techno; ambient techno; ambient; acid house
- Length: 63:24
- Label: Toshiba EMI
- Producer: ~~YMO~~

~~YMO~~ chronology
After Service (1984)	Technodon (1993)	Technodon Live (1993)

Singles from Technodon
- 1. "Be a Superman" Released: 1993; 2. "Pocketful of Rainbows" Released: 1993

Technodon is the eighth and final studio album by Japanese electronic music band Yellow Magic Orchestra. Released in 1993, it was their first album in almost a decade after the band's original breakup in 1984. Because the name Yellow Magic Orchestra was owned by former record label Alfa Records, the band were forced to release the album under the name ~~YMO~~ (typically stylized as the "YMO" initialism crossed out by a large "X"). For the tour that followed, they were billed as Not YMO. Future releases by the group would be made under the names Human Audio Sponge and HASYMO.

The album abandons much of the group's previous synth-pop style, instead adopting a more ambient techno and acid house sound. Yukihiro Takahashi mainly used drum machines for the record as opposed to a drum kit.

== Track listing ==
All songs arranged by ~~YMO~~.

No.	Title	Lyrics	Music	Length
1.	"Be a Superman"	Ryuichi Sakamoto, Yukihiro Takahashi	Sakamoto, Takahashi	5:21
2.	"Nanga Def?"	Sakamoto	~~YMO~~	5:10
3.	"Floating Away"	William Gibson	Takahashi, Haruomi Hosono	6:46
4.	"Dolphinicity"		Hosono	5:12
5.	"Hi-Tech Hippies"	~~YMO~~	~~YMO~~	4:24
6.	"I Tre Merli"		~~YMO~~	6:05
7.	"Nostalgia"		Sakamoto	4:48
8.	"Silence of Time"	Sakamoto	Sakamoto, Takahashi	5:41
9.	"Waterford"		Sakamoto, Takahashi	5:38
10.	"O.K."	Hosono	Hosono, Takahashi	4:29
11.	"Chance"		Sakamoto	4:57
12.	"Pocketful of Rainbows"	Fred Wise, Ben Weisman (Japanese translation: Reiko Yukawa)	Wise, Weisman	5:00

2011 & 2020 re-issues and vinyl release bonus track
No.	Title	Lyrics	Music	Length
13.	"Pocketful of Rainbows (English Version)"	Wise, Weisman	Wise, Weisman	4:36

== Personnel ==
- Ryuichi Sakamoto: keyboards, vocals
- Yukihiro Takahashi: drums, vocals
- Haruomi Hosono: bass, keyboards, vocals

== Additional Credits ==
- William S. Burroughs: Voice on "Be a Superman" & "I Tre Merli"
- Ruriko Kamiya: Voice on "Be a Superman"
- William Gibson: Voice on "Floating Away"
- Hirofumi Tokutake: Guitar on "Floating Away"
- John C. Lilly: Voice on "Dolphinicity"
