= LaTour (album) =

Studio album by LaTour
- Released: 1991
- Studios: Chicago Trax Studio (except "Blue"; recorded at Streeterville Recording)
- Genre: House music
- Length: 46:35 (original); 58:52 (with extended remixes)
- Label: Smash/PolyGram
- Producers: LaTour, Mark Picchotti

Professional ratings
Review scores
Source	Rating
AllMusic	2.5/5 stars
Calgary Herald	B
Chicago Tribune	3/4 stars
Entertainment Weekly	B−
NME	4/10

LaTour is the debut album by house music songwriter/producer LaTour. Released in 1991, it featured the hit single "People Are Still Having Sex". In the album edit of the song, the lyric was originally written as "This AIDS thing's not working". It was changed to "This safe thing's not working" for airplay. It reached a peak of 35 on the pop charts, while peaking at number one on the dance charts and number 15 on the UK charts.

== Critical reception ==
Dave Obee from Calgary Herald wrote, "What's this? "Lust keeps on lurking. This AIDS thing's not working"? Can we say that on the radio? Maybe not. We'd better head to the dance clubs, where the song "People Are Still Having Sex" would come as no surprise. You might even get to hear some of LaTour's other songs, such as "Allen's Got a New Hi-Fi". Yes, it's dance music, with all the programming and sampling you can stand. But this electro-pop marvel offers much more - namely, catchy hooks highlighting lyrics that are, to say the least, interesting. Sure, the singing is decadent - but it's also, somehow, full of life. Just remember: Even though you can't see or hear them, somebody in the world is having sex right now."

Brenda Herrmann from Chicago Tribune said, "Early-'80s influences are obvious, but the album is surprisingly cohesive, with the two best songs being the dance hit "People Are Still Having Sex" and the rough "Allan's Got a New Hi-Fi." Others like "Fantasy Soldiers" and "Cold" are also good for dancing or just listening." Marisa Fox from Entertainment Weekly viewed it as "an album of techno-dance tracks that all sound alike. Machine-driven beats blend together blandly, and LaTour’s factual narratives and occasional bursts into song offer little variation in texture."

== Track listing ==
=== Original album ===
- All Songs Written By LaTour, except where noted.
1. Allen's Got a New Hi-Fi 4:21
2. People Are Still Having Sex 5:31
3. Involved 3:27
4. Cold 5:52 (LaTour, Mark Picchiotti)
5. Fantasy Soldiers 3:12
6. Amazing You 4:24
7. Laurie Monster 3:58 (LaTour, Joe Spattafora)
8. Psych 4:25
9. Dark Sunglasses 3:28
10. Blue 7:37

=== Extended remixes ===
1. Allen's Got a Brand New Hi-Fi 5:03
2. People Are Still Having Sex 7:10

== Production ==
- Executive Producer: Marvin Gleicher
- Produced By LaTour & Mark Picchotti
- Engineers: Bill Rascati, Dave Sears, Steve Spapperi
- Mastering engineer: Ted Jensen

== Personnel ==
- LaTour - vocals, keyboards, synthesizers, samples, drum programming
- Mark Picchotti - samples, drum programming
