= Weißt du, wie viel Sternlein stehen =

German lullaby

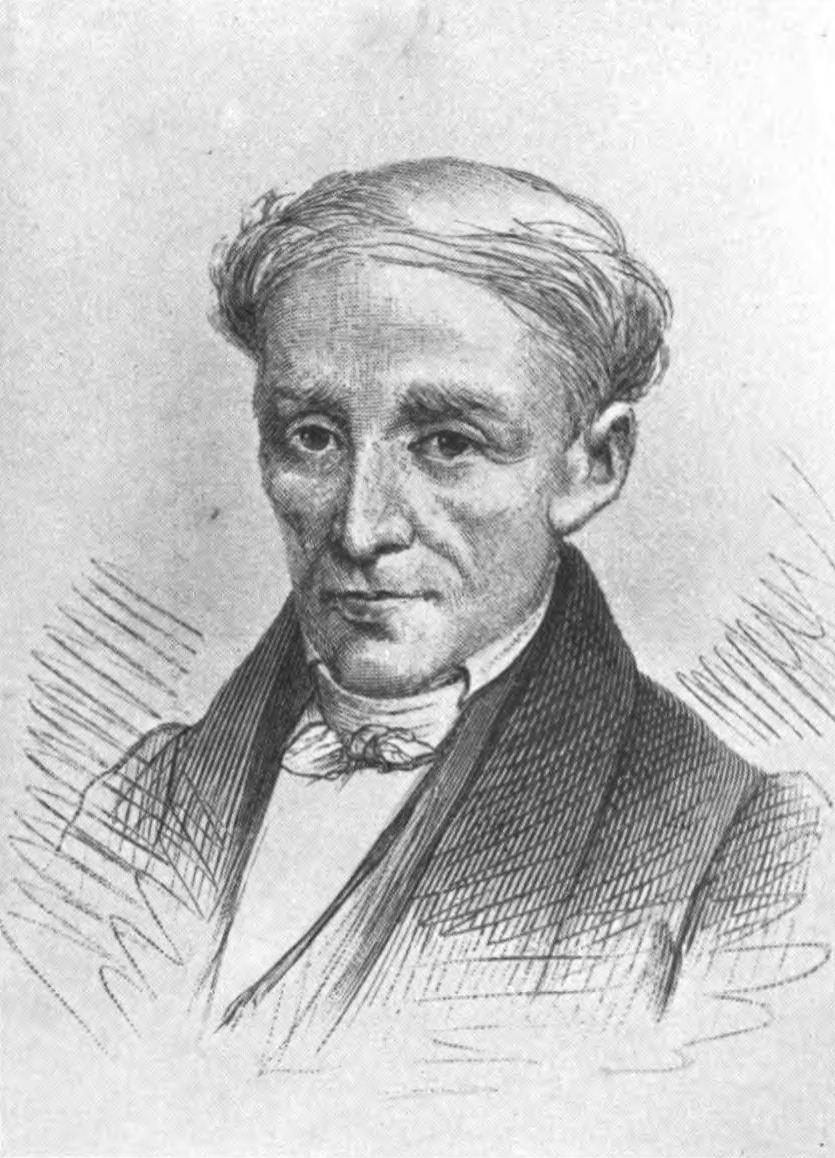
Johann Wilhelm Hey

"Weißt du, wie viel Sternlein stehen" (German for "Do you know how many stars there are?") is a German lullaby and popular evening song. The lyrics were written by the Protestant pastor and poet Wilhelm Hey (1789–1854), who published them first in 1837. The melody is recorded back to 1818. A poetic English translation of the first and third verse is by Henry William Dulcken (1832–1894).

The song was incorporated in the Evangelisches Gesangbuch (Nr. 511) in the section "Natur und Jahreszeiten" (German for "nature and seasons").

== Melody and lyrics ==
MIDI-based rendition

Church organ EG 511

Weißt du, wie viel Sternlein (Note: Wilhelm Hey: 'Sterne') stehen
an dem blauen Himmelszelt?
Weißt du, wie viel Wolken gehen
weithin über alle Welt?
Gott der Herr hat sie gezählet,
dass ihm auch nicht eines fehlet
an der ganzen großen Zahl.

Weißt du, wie viel Mücklein spielen
in der heißen: (Note: Hey: 'hellen') Sonnenglut,
wie viel Fischlein auch sich kühlen
in der hellen Wasserflut?
Gott der Herr rief sie mit Namen,
dass sie all' ins Leben kamen,
dass sie nun so fröhlich sind.

Weißt du, wie viel Kinder frühe
stehn aus ihrem: (Note: Hey: 'ihren') Bettlein auf,
dass sie ohne Sorg' und Mühe
fröhlich sind im Tageslauf?
Gott im Himmel hat an allen
seine Lust, sein Wohlgefallen;
kennt auch dich und hat dich lieb.

Can you count the stars that brightly
twinkle in the midnight sky?
Can you count the clouds, so lightly
o'er the meadows floating by?
God, the Lord, doth mark their number,
with His eyes that never slumber;
He hath made them everyone.

Can you count the wings now flashing
in the sunshine's golden light?
Can you count the fish splashing
in the cooling waters bright?
God, the Lord, a name hath given,
to all creatures under Heaven;
He hath named them everyone.

Do you know how many children
rise each morning blithe and gay?
Can you count their jolly voices,
singing sweetly day by day?
God hears all the happy voices,
in their merry songs rejoices;
and He loves them, every one.

== History ==
Wilhelm Hey published the text at first in 1837 in the seriously appendix (trans.) of his second collection for children. Funfzig neue Fabeln, which the publisher Friedrich Christoph Perthes initially published anonymously and which was reprinted multiple times in the 19th century. The Christmas song "Alle Jahre wieder" is from the same collection.

== See also ==
- Christian child's prayer § Lullabies
