= Kay Twomey =

American songwriter (1914–1995)

Kathleen G. "Kay" Twomey (April 27, 1914 – September 26, 1995) was an American songwriter and music arranger. Born in Boston, Massachusetts, Twomey co-wrote "Serenade of the Bells", which reached the Billboard Best Seller chart on November 7, 1947 and lasted for 16 weeks on the chart, peaking at number 3, and in a separate recording reached the Billboard Best Seller chart on December 26, 1947 at number 13. She also co-wrote "Wooden Heart", best known for its use in the 1960 Elvis Presley film G.I. Blues. A cover version by Joe Dowell made it to number one in the US charts at the end of August 1961. Dowell's version also spent three weeks at number one on the Easy Listening chart.

Other songs by Twomey include the 1961 Elvis Presley single "Put the Blame on Me", "Lend Me Your Comb" and "In the Beginning", as well as songs recorded by Jo Stafford, Doris Day, Carl Smith, Don Cornell, Jill Corey, Eddy Arnold, Eartha Kitt, Caterina Valente, Guy Mitchell, Johnnie Ray, Brian Hyland, Gus Backus, Ray Ellis, Perry Como ("The Island of Forgotten Lovers"), Hayley Mills, Earl Grant, The Sandpipers, the Eli Radish Band, Frank Sinatra ("Hey! Jealous Lover"), The Statler Brothers, Leroy Van Dyke, Lucille Starr, Girl Trouble, The Beatles, Daniel O'Donnell, Barbara Lynn, David Houston and the Nat King Cole Trio.

She died in Wellesley, Massachusetts, aged 81.
