= People Are Still Having Sex =

1991 single by LaTour

Single by LaTour

from the album LaTour
- Released: March 1991
- Genre: Techno
- Length: 5:31 (original edit); 4:08 (radio edit)
- Label: Smash; Polydor
- Songwriter: William LaTour
- Producer: William LaTour

LaTour singles chronology
"Involved" (1991)	"People Are Still Having Sex" (1991)	"Blue" (1992)

Music video
- "People Are Still Having Sex" on YouTube

"People Are Still Having Sex" is a song written and performed by American musician LaTour. It was released in March 1991 by Smash and Polydor Records as the first single from his self-titled debut album, LaTour (1991). The song was produced by him and reached number one on both the US and Canadian dance charts. It also peaked at number 35 on the US Billboard Hot 100 and number 15 on the UK Singles Chart. In 2024, DJ Mag featured "People Are Still Having Sex" in their list of "40 Essential Tracks from 40 Years of House Music".

== Background and release ==
Massachusetts-born LaTour worked 11 years as Production Director in radio. He started as a DJ in Phoenix and moved to Chicago. A radio station in Detroit got a cassette copy of "People Are Still Having Sex" and began playing the song — it suddenly became the Number One requested record.

LaTour told about the song in an interview, "The reaction has been 95 percent positive and the rest negative due to the word 'Aids' in the song. I guess people weren't really listening to the song very closely and when they heard the word Aids come up they'd freak out, begin to call the radio stations and say 'This is a pretty strong song — you shouldn't be playing this'. So radio stations were taking it off the air! But I'm not saying anything positive about Aids in the song. I'm not saying anything positive about SEX — it's just the way it was taken. The people complaining about it were getting into the dance beat and didn't really listen to the lyrical content."

== Content ==
The song features a monologue expounding the narrator's observations that "people everywhere" are "still having sex"; no matter what authority figures such as parents and counselors advise, and despite the risk posed by AIDS.

== Critical reception ==
Larry Flick from Billboard magazine wrote that "People Are Still Having Sex" is "one of the quirkier tunes now breaking out of the Chicago club circuit", noting that "a hypnotic techno beat is topped with a detached male voice reporting the frequency at which folks continue to fornicate." He added, "Industrialists will find "Mark's Missionary Mix" by Mark Picchiotti most useful, while "Mo's Sleazy Mix" by Maurice Joshua will please house enthusiasts." A reviewer from Cashbox said the song "is excellent primer for the rest of the disc." Marisa Fox from Entertainment Weekly commented, "In a dry, radio-announcer tone, LaTour (appropriately, a former producer of commercials) declares over a soundscape of racy rhythms, tinges of electronic melody, and hard-hitting beats that 'People Are Still Having Sex'." She added that "this hit song, about the AIDS generation's irrepressible lustfulness, has been causing controversy, mostly because it contained the word AIDS until radio censors had their way." Stephen Dalton from NME declared it as "a solidly pumping bottom line of bleep-driven beats woven into LaTour's distant, deadpan commentary on biological bedroom habits."

== Music video ==
The song's accompanying music video features early 1990s computer animation, and also features various animated backgrounds, some of which relate to the song's topic, and LaTour's live face is seen at the left and right of the screen during his speaking parts, while animation occupies the rest of the screen. The video was conceived by H-Gun, creator of early videos by Nine Inch Nails and Ministry.

The video of the song was featured on the animated MTV series Beavis and Butt-head, on the episode "Temporary Insanity", which aired on December 10, 1994, and in the Top40 Breakers on the 13 June 1991 broadcast of Top of the Pops, where presenter Jakki Brambles said that LaTour planned a follow-up called People Are Still Having Lunch. LaTour then appeared live in the studio on the 20 June 1991 broadcast of Top of the Pops with various backing artists, as the single climbed up the charts.

== Charts ==
=== Weekly charts ===
Chart (1991)	Peak position
Australia (ARIA)	17
Belgium (Ultratop 50 Flanders)	21
Canada Top Singles (RPM)	73
Canada Dance/Urban (RPM)	1
Europe (Eurochart Hot 100)	27
Finland (Suomen virallinen lista)	13
Germany (GfK)	26
Ireland (IRMA)	21
Israel (Israeli Singles Chart)	6
Luxembourg (Radio Luxembourg)	2
New Zealand (Recorded Music NZ)	30
UK Singles (Official Charts)	15
UK Airplay (Music Week)	30
UK Dance (Music Week)	7
UK Club Chart (Record Mirror)	7
US Billboard Hot 100	35
US 12-inch Singles Sales (Billboard)	3
US Dance Club Play (Billboard)	1
US Cash Box Top 100	40

=== Year-end charts ===
Chart (1991)	Position
Canada Dance/Urban (RPM)	11
UK Club Chart (Record Mirror)	51
US 12-inch Singles Sales (Billboard)	27
US Dance Club Play (Billboard)	21

== Release history ==
Region	Date	Format(s)	Label(s)	Ref.
United States	March 1991	12-inch vinyl; cassette	Smash	
United Kingdom	May 27, 1991	7-inch vinyl; 12-inch vinyl; CD; cassette	Polydor	
Australia	June 24, 1991	7-inch vinyl; 12-inch vinyl; cassette	Polydor	
