= Henry William Dulcken =

English translator and children's writer

Henry William Dulcken (1832-1894) was an English translator and children's writer, best known for translating the stories of Hans Christian Andersen. Many of his books for children were illustrated by the Brothers Dalziel. Described as a "jobbing editor", he was sometimes hired to provide text for the pictures of others, such as Arthur Boyd Houghton.

Dulcken also translated Wilhelm Hey's hymn Can you count the stars?.

== Works ==
=== Translations ===
- The little drummer, or, Filial affection : a story of the Russian campaign by Gustav Nieritz. Translated from the German 1852.
- Visit to the Holy Land, Egypt, and Italy by Ida Pfeiffer. Translated from the German 1852.
- The Book of German Songs: from the sixteenth to the nineteenth century. 1856.
- Ollendorff's new and easy method of learning the German language by Heinrich Godefroy Ollendorff. Translated from the French 1858.
- Picture Fables drawn by O. Speckter, engraved by the Brothers Dalziel, with rhymes translated from the German of F. H. [Wilhelm Hey] by H. W. Dulcken. 1858
- The last travels of Ida Pfeiffer : inclusive of a visit to Madagascar: with an autobiographical memoir of the author, London: Routledge, Warne & Routledge, 1861.
- Stories and Tales by Hans Christian Andersen. Translated from the Danish. London, 1864.
- What the moon saw, and other tales by Hans Christian Andersen. 1865
- Stories for the household by Hans Christian Andersen. 1866.
- Out of the heart: spoken to the little ones by Hans Christian Andersen. Translated from the Danish. London : Routledge, 1867.
- The goloshes of fortune and other stories by Hans Christian Andersen, 1869
- The marsh king's daughter and other stories by Hans Christian Andersen, 1869.
- Poultry Meg's family, and other stories by Hans Christian Andersen, 1869
- New light on dark Africa: being the narrative of the German Emin Pasha expedition, its journeyings and adventures among the native tribes of eastern equatorial Africa, the Gallas, Massais, Wasukuma, etc., etc., on the Lake Baringo and the Victoria Nyanza by Karl Peters. Translated from the German Die deutsche Emin-Pascha Expedition. London, New York, Melbourne: Ward, Lock, and Co., 1891.

=== Other ===
- (ed.) A synopsis of Roman antiquities by John Lanktree. Revised and enlarged ed., 1857.
- Our favourite Fairy Tales and famous histories, told for the hundredth time by H. W. D. Illustrated with three hundred pictures engraved by the Brothers Dalziel from original designs by eminent artists. London: Ward & Lock, 1858
- The fairy album for good little folk: with one hundred and forty illustrations. London: Ward & Lock, 1859.
- (ed.) Pearls from the poets: specimens of the works of celebrated writers, London: Ward & Lock, 1860. With a preface by Thomas Dale.
- (ed.) The Bible album, or, Sacred truth illustrated by the poets: being poems illustrative of holy scripture, 1863
- (ed.) The Golden harp: hymns, rhymes and songs for the young, London: Routledge, Warne and Routledge, 1864
- Wild animals and their homes: being pictures of the animal creation, drawn from nature, and accurately and carefully coloured, for the amusement and instruction of the young: with a descriptive text, intended to serve as a first introduction to natural history, London: Ward, Lock and Tyler, 1865.
- A picture history of England: from the invasion of Julius Caesar to the present time, London: Routledge, 1865.
- (ed.) Dalziels' illustrated Goldsmith : comprising The vicar of Wakefield [...]; with one hundred pictures drawn by George John Pinwell, engraved by the Brothers Dalziel, London: Ward and Lock, 1865.
- Golden Light : being scripture histories for the young, from the Old and New Testaments, London: Routledge, Warne and Routledge, 1865.
- Dalziel's Illustrated Arabian nights' entertainments, 1865.
- The world's explorers, or, Travels and adventures, 1868.
- Good old stories and fairy tales told for the hundredth time, 1869.
- Old nursery tales and famous histories, 1869.
- One by one: a child's book of tales and fables. 1869.
- Rhyme and reason: a picture book of verses for little folks, 1869.
- Animal life the world over. 1870.
- A handy history of England for the young London & New York, 1875.
- Happy day stories for the young. London & New York, 1876.
- The boy's handy book of natural history. London & Frome, 1879.
- Morning light... being scripture stories for the young. 1881.
- Moral nursery tales for children. [c.1885].
- A popular history of England from the earliest period to the Jubilee of Victoria, Queen and Empress, in the year 1887, 1888
- (ed.) The imperial history of England: from the earliest records to the present time, comprising the entire work of David Hume, copiously supplemented and annotated; and the later history of the British empire, derived from the most authentic sources. With summaries of events on the continent illustrating the course of contemporaneous continental history. London: Ward, Lock & Co. 3 vols.
