= Wooden Heart =

Pop song recorded by Elvis Presley

- Picture sleeve for one of 1961 German singles

Single by Elvis Presley

from the album G.I. Blues
- A-side: "Blue Christmas" (USA 1964)
- B-side: "Tonight Is So Right for Love" (UK 1961)
- Released: 23 September 1960 (G.I. Blues album); 10 March 1961 (UK single); November 1964 (single)
- Recorded: 28 April 1960
- Genre: Pop; folk
- Length: 2:03
- Label: RCA
- Songwriters: Fred Wise, Ben Weisman, Kay Twomey, Bert Kaempfert
- Producer: Steve Sholes

Elvis Presley USA singles chronology
"Ask Me" (1964)	"Wooden Heart" (1964)	"Do the Clam" (1965)

Elvis Presley UK singles chronology
"Are You Lonesome Tonight?" (1960)	"Wooden Heart" (1961)	"Surrender" (1961)

Music video
- "Wooden Heart" (audio) on YouTube

"Wooden Heart"

Single by Joe Dowell
- B-side: "Little Bo Peep"
- Released: June 1961
- Genre: Pop
- Length: 2:01
- Label: Smash
- Songwriters: Fred Wise, Ben Weisman, Kay Twomey, Bert Kaempfert

Joe Dowell singles chronology
"Wooden Heart" (1961)	"The Bridge Of Love" (1961)

"Wooden Heart" is a pop song recorded by Elvis Presley. The composition is based on a German folk song "Muss i denn" (lit. Must I then) and it was featured in the 1960 Elvis Presley film G.I. Blues. The song was a hit single for Presley in the UK Singles Chart, reaching No. 1 for six weeks in March and April 1961.

== Background ==
The song was published by Elvis Presley's company Gladys Music, Inc. In the United States, it was released in November 1964 as the B-side to "Blue Christmas". Presley performed the song live during his Dinner Show concert at the Hilton Hotel in Las Vegas in 1975, a recording available on the Elvis Presley live album Dinner At Eight.

A cover version by Joe Dowell on the Smash Records label made it to number one in the US at the end of August 1961, knocking Bobby Lewis' "Tossin' and Turnin'" off the number one spot on the Billboard Hot 100 after seven weeks. Dowell's version also spent three weeks at number one on the Easy Listening chart.

"Wooden Heart", written by Fred Wise, Ben Weisman, Kay Twomey and German bandleader Bert Kaempfert, was based on the German folk song, "Muss i denn", originating from the Rems Valley in Württemberg, south-west Germany, and arranged by Friedrich Silcher. "Wooden Heart" features several lines from the original folk song. Marlene Dietrich recorded a version of the song in the original German sometime before 1958, pre-dating Presley, which appears as a B-side on a 1959 version of her single "Lili Marlene", released by Philips in association with Columbia Records. The Elvis Presley version was published by Gladys Music, Elvis Presley's publishing company. Bobby Vinton recorded his version in 1975 with those lines translated into Polish.

The Elvis Presley version features two sections in German, the first being the first four lines: "Muss Ich denn zum Städtele hinaus". The second section is towards the end and is based on a translation of the English version (therefore not appearing in the original German folk lyrics): Sei mir gut, sei mir gut, sei mir wie du wirklich sollst, wie du wirklich sollst... ("Be good to me, be good to me, be to me how you really should, how you really should...").

== Chart history ==
=== Elvis Presley ===
==== Weekly charts ====
Chart (1961)	Peak position
Australia (Kent Music Report)	1
Austria	1
Belgium (Ultratop 50 Flanders)	1
Belgium (Ultratop 50 Wallonia)	1
Canada (CHUM Hit Parade)	2
West Germany (GfK)	1
Ireland (IRMA)	1
Netherlands (Single Top 100)	1
New Zealand (Lever Hit Parade)	3
Norway (VG-lista)	1
South Africa	1
Spain	1
UK Singles (OCC)	1

Chart (1964)	Peak position
US Billboard Bubbling Under the Hot 100	107

Chart (1965)	Peak position
US Billboard Bubbling Under the Hot 100	110

Chart (1977)	Peak position
Belgium (Ultratop 50 Flanders)	2
Netherlands (Dutch Top 40)	1
Netherlands (Single Top 100)	1

Chart (2005)	Peak position
France (SNEP)	94
Netherlands (Single Top 100)	23
Sweden (Sverigetopplistan)	56

==== Year-end charts ====
Chart (1961)	Rank
Australia	3
South Africa	1
UK	3

== Sales ==
Sales for Wooden Heart
Region	Sales
Europe	3,000,000
Germany	600,000
Netherlands	90,000

=== Joe Dowell ===
Weekly charts
Chart (1961)	Peak position
US Billboard Hot 100	1
US Billboard Easy Listening	1
US Cash Box Top 100	3

Year-end charts
Chart (1961)	Rank
US Billboard Hot 100	10
US Cash Box	22

=== Gus Backus ===
Chart (1960)	Peak position
West Germany (GfK)	2
US Billboard Bubbling Under Hot 100	102

== Editions ==
- (US) "Blue Christmas" b/w "Wooden Heart" Released: November 1964, RCA 447-0720

== Other versions ==
- Tom Petty and the Heartbreakers: released on their 2015 album of previously unreleased material, Nobody's Children
- Bobby Vinton released the song as a 45 single on ABC Records in 1975. It reached number 58 in the US charts.
- The Lizards' Convention: released on the 1995 album Here's a Funny Fish, Hurrah!
