= LaTour =

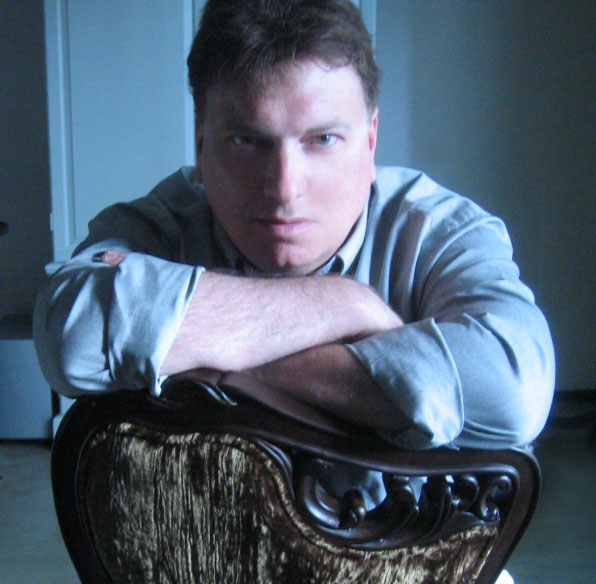
- William "Bill" LaTour in 2011

Background information
- Born: William LaTour
- Origin: Lowell, Massachusetts, U.S.
- Genres: Electronica, dance, industrial, pop, punk, parody
- Occupations: Musician, composer, songwriter, voice-over actor, production director, voice-over producer and engineer
- Instruments: Piano, keyboard, drums, guitar, bass, programming
- Years active: 1987–present
- Labels: Polydor (1989–1993); Smash Records (1989–1996)

William LaTour, better known by his stage names LaTour and Bud LaTour, is an American musician, disc jockey and voice-over artist. His musical genres span electronic, house, glam, rock, dance, punk, and parody. LaTour is best known for the 1991 Number 1 Billboard electronic dance hit "People Are Still Having Sex". and for his instrumental deep house track, "Blue".

== Musical career ==
As a child, LaTour found a talent in writing parody songs. Later, working at a radio station created the environment to record comedy songs and feature them on the air for skits. Like many parody songwriters, The Dr. Demento Radio Show played a large part in showcasing the early talents of LaTour. A parody version of Falco's "Rock Me Amadeus" entitled, "Rock Me Jerry Lewis" was credited to Bud Latour and fellow Phoenix, Arizona disc jockey, Mike Elliott. "Rock Me Jerry Lewis" reached Number 1 on The Dr. Demento's Funny Five chart.

LaTour was a member of Chicago punk band The Squids, formed in Chicago in 1989. He remained a member of the group until 1991, and played his final show with them at the Chicago Metro. Upon leaving the band, he began producing house music, signed with Smash Records and released his first eponymous LaTour album in 1991. "People Are Still Having Sex" reached number one on the Hot Dance Music/Club Play chart, and became a Billboard Hot 100 Top 40 hit (number 35). The song reached number 15 in the UK singles chart after he performed on Top of the Pops. "Blue" was featured during the club scene in the film Basic Instinct. He released a second album, Home on the Range, in 1993, and had other hits on the U.S. Hot Dance chart, including the songs "Cold", "Hypnomania", "Craziaskowboi" and "E".

During the busiest phase of LaTour's recording career, the 1990s, he joined fellow house music producer, Terry "Housemaster" Baldwin to create a number of Chicago house singles for the underground house scene under the name "The L&B Project". This was named for the letters of both artists' last names.

In 1997, LaTour formed another band, Muzloh. The rest of the band included Chicago musicians Dave Hunt, Don Batryn, Pete Shorner and Emery "Joe" Yost (who previously played with LaTour in The Squids). In the Chicago area, Muzloh played the House of Blues, the Metro Chicago club, Gunther Murphy's and the Chicago Free Fest. Muzloh released an album in 1997 titled Supersonic Gold on Spoon Records.

LaTour also performed as a studio musician for many house music record labels in Chicago during the '90s and musicians including Ralphie Rosario, White Knight, Terry Baldwin, Frankie Hollywood Rodriguez, DJ International Records, SOS Records, Underground Construction Records and Trax Records.

== Radio career ==
LaTour's radio work began at an early age, spending many hours at Trevor G. Browne High School's high school radio station in Phoenix, Arizona. The station was broadcast into the school's lunchroom and quad area. During those high school years, at the age of 16, LaTour became licensed by the Federal Communications Commission (FCC) and secured a job at KUPD 97.9 in Phoenix. He joined as their weekend on-air personality from 1979 to 1983 and would begin to hone his skills as a voice-over actor, parody music songwriter and musician.

From 1983, LaTour joined KZZP as their weekend on-air personality on the FM station and did the midday shift on their AM frequency until 1986. It was at this station that on-air personality Chris Shebel coined him William "Bud" LaTour.

After leaving KZZP, LaTour, now known primarily as "Bud" LaTour went on to Mesa, Arizona's KDKB as their morning show personality while also the station's production director. Only there for the year, LaTour moved to Phoenix's KSLX as the evening personality and then joined Chicago's WRXR. Climbing the ranks of radio, LaTour secured a position at a larger station, WBBM-FM also known as B96 as their weekend personality and production director from 1987 until 1992.

From 1998 to 1999, LaTour joined WXXY as their evening personality using the name Bill LaTour. He later moved to one of Chicago's only dance-format radio station, WKIE otherwise known as Energy 92.7/5. The station released two full-length music CDs due to their popular format. He was their production director and midday personality, where he went only by the name LaTour.

When the station changed formats, LaTour joined Chicago's CBS Radio station WJMK, otherwise known as Jack FM, and continued as their production director. In 2009, he moved to Los Angeles to pursue radio and voice acting while still handling voice-over spots for WJMK.

In January 2010, LaTour was offered the position of production director for KSWD 100.3, The Sound.

== Discography ==
=== Albums ===
List of albums, with selected details
Title	Details
LaTour	Released: 1991; Label: Smash; Format: CD, cassette, LP
Home on the Range	Released: 1993; Label: Smash; Format: CD, cassette

=== Extended plays ===
List of EPs with selected details
Title	Details
The Project E.P. (as LaTour & Baldwin)	Released: 1996; Label: Firm Music; Format: CD

=== Singles ===
List of singles, with selected chart positions
Title	Year	Peak chart positions						Album
Title	Year	US	US Dance	AUS	GER	NZ	UK	Album
"People Are Still Having Sex"	1991	35	1	17	26	30	15	LaTour
"Involved"	1991	—	—	—	—	—	—	LaTour
"Blue"	1991	—	—	—	—	—	—	LaTour
"Cold"	1992	—	25	—	—	—	—	LaTour
"E"	1993	—	—	—	—	—	—	Home On The Range
"Craziaskowboi"	1993	—	—	—	—	—	—	Home On The Range
"Hypnomania"	1993	—	—	—	—	—	—	Home On The Range

== See also ==
- List of artists who reached number one on the U.S. Dance Club Songs chart
- Timeline of Billboard number-one dance songs
- Music of Chicago
- Culture of Chicago
