= Rätsel =

German riddle song

Song
- Language: German
- English title: Riddle
- Published: not later than 1806
- Genre: Folk
- Songwriter: Traditional

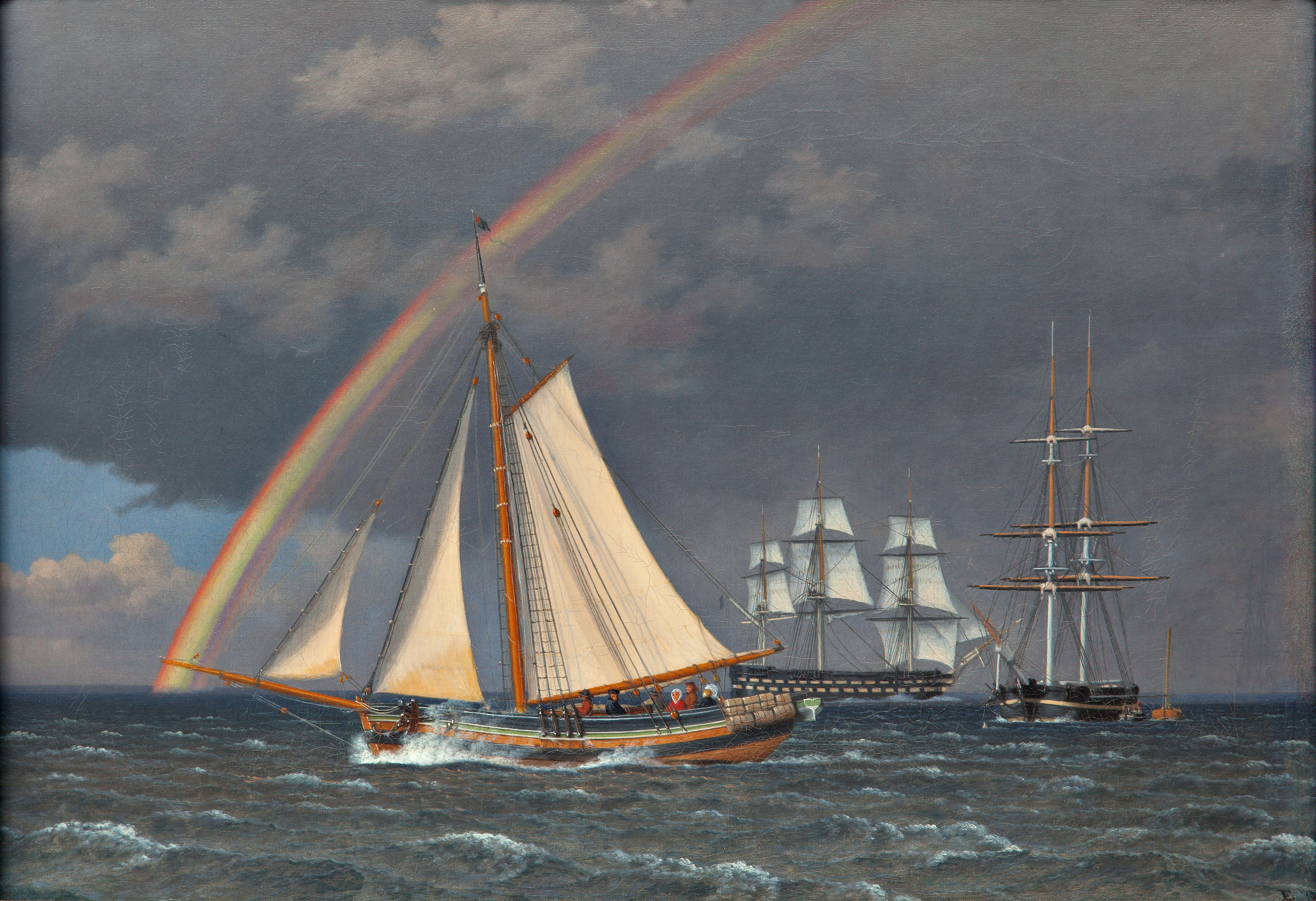
Rainbow at sea with some cruising ships (C. W. Eckersberg, 1836)

"Rätsel" (Riddle) is a German riddle-song from the 1806 collection of folks songs Des Knaben Wunderhorn by Achim von Arnim and Clemens Brentano.

The text is written in iambic tetrameter. According to German studies academic Klaus Manger, this folk poem might have inspired Brentano for some of his own poems.

The song was also published in later songbooks and anthologies (Mythologische Bibliothek, Carl Gustav Schwetschke's Die Natur etc.).

The melody of Rätsel

== Words ==
Es ist die wunderschönste Brück',
Darüber noch kein Mensch gegangen,
Doch ist daran ein seltsam Stück,
Daß über ihr die Wasser hangen,
Und unter ihr die Leute gehn
Ganz trocken, und sie froh ansehn,
Die Schiffe segelnd durch sie ziehn,
Die Vögel sie durchfliegen kühn;
Doch stehet sie im Sturme fest,
Kein Zoll noch Weggeld zahlen läßt.

It is the most beautiful bridge
that no man has crossed yet,
but it is very strange
that water hangs above it.
And under her her the people go
completely dry, and they gladly watch
ship sailing through it
and birds fly through it boldly;
but it stands firm in the storm,
no toll nor tribute it demands.
