= Iowa Great Lakes Recording Company =

Recording studio in the United States

The Iowa Great Lakes Recording Company, Inc was a recording studio located at 906 9th St. in Milford, Iowa, in the area of Iowa known as the Iowa Great Lakes region. Co-founders and original owners Roger Blunt, Cliff Plagman and John Senn started the process of building the studio in February 1965, officially opening for business on June 1, 1965. IGL Recording Company was the second known recording facility in the state at the time and the first to use multi-track tape machines. After its opening until its closing in 1980 the studio hosted hundreds of groups and individuals, releasing over 200 records. The recording that brought IGL to the attention of a broader audience was Peter Rabbit by Dee Jay and the Runaways, which was initially released on IGL's own label and later leased to Mercury/Smash Records. The studio recorded many different styles of music including rock, pop, gospel, polka and school choirs. On January 1, 1980, John Senn, sole owner at the time, closed the studio. The IGL Recording Co. has been inducted into the Iowa Rock 'n' Roll Hall of Fame, Minnesota Music Hall of Fame and South Dakota Rock and Roll Hall of Fame.

== History ==
The Iowa Great Lakes Recording Company, Inc.—or simply IGL—was founded by Roger Blunt, Cliff Plagman and John Senn. Senn became acquainted with Blunt and Plagman through a bandmate, Chuck Maranell, who worked at the same hardware store with the pair in 1960. Blunt owned a reel to reel tape recorder and had recorded a band whose members included Senn and Maranell in 1961. Due to the less than acceptable quality of this recording, Blunt, along with his tape recorder, accompanied the group to a radio station in Minnesota to record the group in what was hoped to be a better environment for such an endeavor. This event planted the idea for what became IGL.

From 1961 until 1964 the trio of Blunt, Plagman and Senn had informal discussions on putting together a recording studio in their area. At that time the closest studio in Iowa was 350 miles away. Other choices were Minneapolis, La Crosse, Omaha and Chicago. Plagman, who was adept at electronics, had his own business selling and repairing TVs at this time. Blunt was still improving his skills at recording and was gaining insight into the reproduction of sound. Senn was involved with the performance end of music and was aware of the needs of musicians for a more conveniently located recording facility. Combining their talents the three gentlemen moved forward to make the studio a reality.

The location of the studio was in the back of Plagman's store (formerly known as the Palmer Building) at the corner of 9th St. and Highway 71 in Milford, Iowa. Plagman had become acquainted with Vic Blacketer who was a distributor of radio broadcast gear in Des Moines, Iowa. Seeking his advice, Blacketer gave his approval on the space the trio chose for the studio. Using Sun Studio in Memphis as a "template", IGL was built in approximately 5 months at a cost of over $10,000 for gear and an undetermined cost for the labor the trio put into the project. Adjusted for inflation the cost would now be over $82,000 for the gear alone. The partners decided to name the facility after the area in which it was located. Although the endeavor was officially incorporated as the Iowa Great Lakes Recording Company, Inc. the "Inc." was often left unsaid as the name was already a mouthful.

When IGL opened on June 1, 1965, its equipment list was as follows: one Ampex 3-track recorder using 2" tape, two Ampex 4-channel mixing consoles, four Electro-Voice Sentry monitors, one McIntosh amp, two Neumann M 49 mics, one Neumann U67 mic along with other mics, outboard gear, stands and cabling. A single track Ampex recorder was purchased in 1966. Then, in 1972, an Ampex 2-track mastering recorder and an Ampex 8-track recorder were added to the facility along with more outboard gear. The studio space was also expanded and modified around this time to better serve the clientele.

Aside from offering a professional space and the gear necessary to record, IGL also offered to handle the pressing and packaging of the recorded product. The artist could choose the IGL/Sonic imprint or could design their own label if desired. On the advice of Blacketer, IGL used Wakefield Manufacturing in Phoenix, AZ for pressing services. For album cover fabrication, IGL used the W.A. Fisher Advertising & Printing Co. in Virginia, MN. At some time in the early 1970s, the facility switched to the Queen City Album Co. (now QCA, Inc.) in Cincinnati, OH since they were a one-stop for all of IGL's needs in this area. An additional service offered was the availability of studio musicians if clients needed additional support - ranging from either a single instrument to a whole backing group.

IGL's fee in 1965 for use of the facility, which included an engineer, was $45/hour. The fee had increased to $55/hr by the time the facility closed. As part of this cost, IGL would send copies of 45s to area radio stations as well as radio stations in the artist's home area. The studio would also send copies to various record distributors in hopes they would pick up the studios offerings. Cost to the client of 1000 45s was $300; 1000 albums with jackets were $1510. As a reference, the retail cost of a 45 in 1965 ran approximately 50 cents, an album cost around $2.98 (mono) to $3.98 (stereo). A package deal was also available which consisted of 3 hours of recording time and 1000 45 singles for a cost of $345.

In 1973 the studio expanded by adding IGL Music Inc. which was considered a division of the IGL Recording Co. IGL Music was primarily a record store, but also offered musical instrument accessories such as guitar strings, straps, drum accessories and sheet music. At the time of its opening the store was run by Dennis and Karen Kintzi.

The studio changed ownership at various times during its life span. In 1980 John Senn, who was then sole owner of the facility, decided to close the studio due in part to declining business. One factor to which the decline in clients was attributed was the rise in popularity of disco music. Other factors, like the growing affordability of semipro products for recording at home which started to appear in the mid 1970s, along with the number of bands declining after the boom which followed the British Invasion in the early 1960s, likely contributed too.

The first release on the IGL label was Jenny Jenny b/w Boney Maronie (IGL 100) by Dee Jay and the Runaways of which only 100 copies were pressed. Aside from this release and the noteworthy release of Peter Rabbit by Dee Jay and the Runaways, another notable recording done at IGL was the album Have You Considered? (IGL STLP-33152) by Shekina Glory. This garage/psych/XIAN album from 1976 has become a valued artifact by those who appreciate the genre with copies selling for upwards of $1025.

== Peter Rabbit ==
The recording that had the most impact on the IGL Recording Co. was Dee Jay and the Runaways recording of Myron Lee and the Caddies 1961 song Peter Rabbit. It also led to the group being the only one from Iowa during the 1960s to appear nationally on Dick Clark's Where the Action Is.

The group had become familiar with that recording while performing at the PlaMor Ballroom in Fort Dodge, IA. A local dee-jay, Peter McClain, played the song when he was emceeing dances at the ballroom. Denny Storey (October 31, 1943 – September 13, 2018) and John Senn (September 29, 1940 – July 18, 2019), both members of the Runaways, had talked about doing their own version of the song. On one occasion while setting up for a dance at the PlaMor, Storey grabbed his guitar and showed Senn an approach to the song he thought would work well. In July 1965, the group recorded nine songs at IGL, one of which was Storey's take on Peter Rabbit.

In January 1966, the group was playing for a dance in Jefferson, IA which was emceed by Jim Michaels, a dee-jay at one of central Iowa's AM Top 40 stations at the time - KIOA. At one point in the evening Michaels played the group's 45 of the song and got a favorable reaction from the crowd. Michaels told the band he would add the 45 to the station's rotation for 3 weeks, if it generated a good response he would keep it on; if not, it would be removed from the playlist.

The song took off and distributors from the region initially placed orders for over 5000 copies of the 45. The quantity of copies on the IGL label that were sold numbered between 8 and 9 thousand prior to the song being leased according to Senn in an interview with KUOO radio's Becky Thoreson. The station received requests from 8 major labels to lease the recording. Michaels recommended that IGL and the band go with Mercury Records which released the single nationally on their Smash label. The 45 entered the Billboard Hot 100 on April 30, 1966, and remained there for 14 weeks reaching #45. In Canada, the song reached #56 and the follow-up single He's Not Your Friend reached #85. As a result of the recording's popularity, the facility where it was recorded gained considerable publicity also and IGL Recording was off and running.

== Personnel ==
Throughout the history of the IGL Recording Co. the following individuals were owners of the facility: co-founders, Plagman and Blunt of Milford along with Senn of Spirit Lake. Other owners during the period the studio was in operation were Dennis Kintzi of Milford, Dave Peterson of Arnolds Park, Jerry Wolford of Spirit Lake, Lynn Wee of Spencer, Dee Swenson of Ocheyedan and Rose Otto of Everly. Senn opened a studio named IGL Audio in 1983 and was one of the founders of the Iowa Rock and Roll Hall of Fame.

Five of the former owners, which includes the 3 founders, have died – Roger Blunt in 1994, Cliff Plagman in 2007, Dee Swenson in 2015, Jerry Wolford in 2009, and John Senn (born September 29, 1940) who died on July 18, 2019, at age 78. He resided in Spirit Lake, Iowa, at the time of his death.
