= Smash Records =

Defunct American record label

- 1960s Smash Records logo
- Parent company: Mercury Records
- Founded: 1961
- Founder: Shelby Singleton
- Defunct: 1996
- Status: Defunct
- Distributor: Island Records (catalog)
- Genre: Various
- Country of origin: U.S.
- Location: Chicago, Illinois

Smash Records was an American record label founded in 1961 as a subsidiary of Mercury Records.

== History ==
Mercury Record Corporation president Irving Green announced the formation of the company's new pop subsidiary label, Smash Records, in March 1961. Smash was seen as an opportunity for greater exposure and sales for both newly signed talent and for independently cut masters.

In the summer of 1961, the label achieved its first number one hit on the Billboard Hot 100, "Wooden Heart," by Joe Dowell.

In November 1961, label head Charles Fach announced the label would move into the "country and western" field, and announced the signing of two artists, Billy Deaton and Howard Crockett. Mercury A&R chief Shelby Singleton was tapped to head the C&W production. Singleton was interested in Southern styles, and had recruited east Texas's Big Bopper and Johnny Preston to the parent label.

Eventually, Smash Records' roster expanded to include artists from other music genres, such as Frankie Valli, James Brown, Bruce Channel, Roger Miller, The Left Banke, Bill Justis, and Jerry Lee Lewis.

A dispute with King Records led James Brown to release all of his band's instrumental recordings between 1964 and 1967 on Smash. Smash also released three of Brown's vocal recordings, including his 1964 proto-funk single "Out of Sight".

Smash shared the numbering system for its singles with other labels that the label distributed. The most significant of these was Fontana Records. Mercury discontinued the Smash label in 1970.

1990s Smash Records logo

After Smash parent Mercury was acquired by PolyGram in 1972, the Smash imprint was used for reissues in the 1980s. PolyGram revived Smash in 1991 as an R&B/dance label with its offices located in Chicago. It was first under the PolyGram Label Group (PLG) umbrella, then under the Independent Label Sales (ILS) umbrella, then under Island Records until the imprint was retired in 1996. One of the hits Smash saw during this period was "People Are Still Having Sex" by house music producer LaTour. Another successful artist on the dance charts was Jamie Principle.

== Artists ==
- The Angels
- The Asylum Choir
- James Brown
- The Caravelles
- Mother Maybelle Carter
- Jimmy Castor
- Bruce Channel
- Crunch-O-Matic
- D'Bora
- Dee Jay & The Runaways (see also Iowa Great Lakes Recording Company)
- Joe Dowell
- Pete Drake (and his talking steel guitar)
- The Festivals
- Jay & the Techniques
- Bill Justis
- Dickie Lee
- Hudsen Bay Co.
- Left Banke
- Jerry Lee Lewis
- Linda Gail Lewis
- Jamie Loring
- LaTour
- Chris Mars
- M-Doc
- The Mesmerizing Eye
- Luke "Long Gone" Miles
- Roger Miller
- The Millions
- The Nouns
- Jamie Principle
- Charlie Rich
- Sir Douglas Quintet
- Millie Small
- Swingin' Medallions
- Pleasure Game
- Presence
- Sheep on Drugs
- The Tempests
- Ten Tray
- Frankie Valli
- Eric Von Schmidt
- The Walker Brothers
- Scott Walker
- Cookie Watkins

== See also ==
- List of record labels
