= Pocketful of Rainbows =

Song by Elvis Presley

from the album G.I. Blues
- Recorded: May 6, 1960
- Genre: Pop
- Length: 2:35
- Label: RCA Victor
- Songwriters: Fred Wise, Ben Weisman
- Producer: Joseph Lilley

"Pocketful of Rainbows" is a song from the 1960 Elvis Presley soundtrack album G.I. Blues, written by Fred Wise and Ben Weisman.

== Song information ==
The song was recorded on May 6, 1960, at RCA Victor's Hollywood studios for Elvis Presley's 1960 film G.I. Blues.

In the film version Juliet Prowse (who lip-synched to Loulie Jean Norman's voice) can be seen singing along with Presley in a cable car in the small German tourist-town Rüdesheim am Rhein.

== Notable cover versions ==
In 1993 the Japanese band Yellow Magic Orchestra released a cover version of "Pocketful of Rainbows", sung in Japanese, as the last song in their final studio album Technodon. In later re-issues a version in English was added as a bonus track. The single reached number 13 on the Oricon Singles Chart and sold 80,000 units in Japan.

A remix by Spankox was released as a single in 2011 and reached No. 32 on the Dutch Single Top 100.
