= Joe Dowell =

American pop singer (1940–2016)

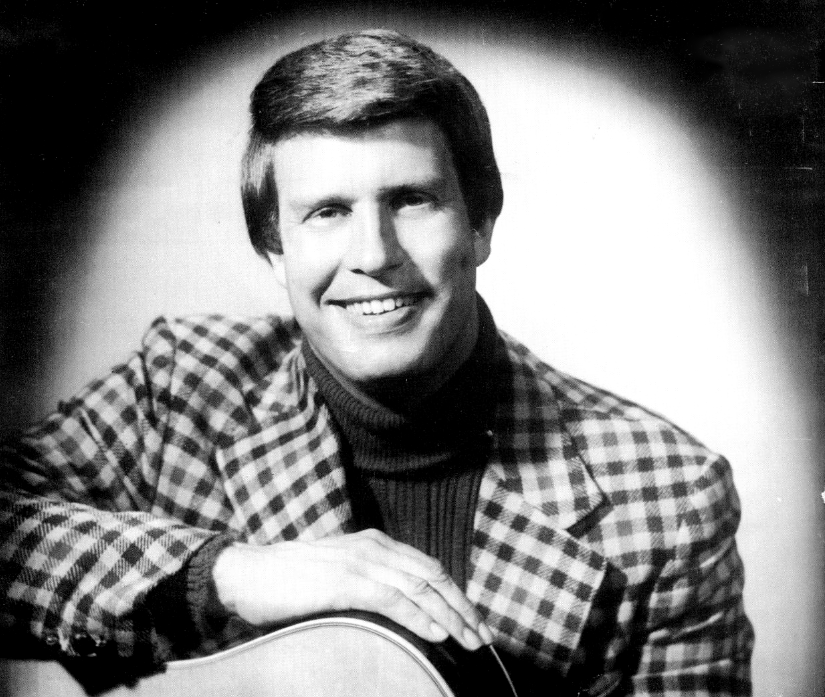
- Dowell in 1973

Background information
- Born: January 23, 1940; Bloomington, Indiana, US
- Died: February 4, 2016 (aged 76) Bloomington, Illinois, US
- Genres: Pop, gospel
- Instruments: Vocals, guitar
- Years active: 1961–1980s
- Labels: Smash, Journey

Joe Dowell (January 23, 1940 – February 4, 2016) was an American pop singer.

== Career ==
He was born in Bloomington, Indiana, and moved to Bloomington, Illinois, as a child. He first performed at a ninth-grade talent show and later attended the University of Illinois. At his first recording session (backed by organist Ray Stevens), he sang the tune "Wooden Heart", which had been a hit for Elvis Presley in Europe but which was never released as a single stateside. In 1961, "Wooden Heart" became the first single released on Smash Records to shoot to No. 1 on the Billboard Hot 100. It sold over one million copies and was awarded a gold disc. In the wake of his success, Dowell wanted to become a songwriter in his own right, but, due to contractual obligations, he was required to sing music owned by Smash's parent company, Mercury Records. He had two further hits, "The Bridge of Love" (US No. 50) and "Little Red Rented Rowboat" (US No. 23) but, after struggles with his management, he was dropped from the label.

Dowell went on to record one single for Monument Records, a folk album in the 1960s, and a number of singles and a gospel album for his own Journey label in the 1970s and 1980s. He also recorded a bicentennial EP at Golden Voice Recording Co in South Pekin, Illinois, for the Boy Scouts of America and radio jingles.

In 2004, Bear Family Records released a CD of Joe Dowell's music, including unreleased recordings.

His publicist and friend Johnny Vallis confirmed to the Associated Press, that Joe Dowell died on February 4, 2016, in Bloomington, Illinois, after suffering a heart attack the prior weekend. He was 76.

== Discography ==
=== Singles ===
Year	Title	US Hot 100	US Easy Listening	Label
1961	"Wooden Heart" / "Little Bo Peep"	1	1	Smash 1708
1961	"The Bridge of Love" / "Just Love Me"	50	10	Smash 1717
1962	"Little Red Rented Rowboat" / "The One I Left for You"	23	--	Smash 1759
1962	"Poor Little Cupid" / "No Secrets"	--	--	Smash 1786
