= Vilmos Zsigmond filmography =

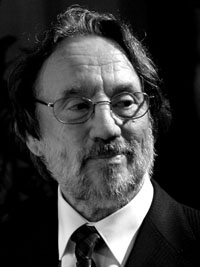
Vilmos Zsigmond, 2004

Cinematographer Vilmos Zsigmond, also formerly credited as William Zsigmond, was nominated for four Academy Awards for Best Cinematography (Close Encounters of the Third Kind, The Deer Hunter, The River, and The Black Dahlia), winning once for his work on Close Encounters of the Third Kind. He also won two American Society of Cinematographers Awards, one Primetime Emmy Award, and one British Academy Film Award.

This article includes all of Zsigmond's credits as a cinematographer both in film and television.

== Feature films ==
=== Director ===
- The Long Shadow (1992)

=== Cinematographer ===
Year	Title	Director	Notes
1962	Wild Guitar	Ray Dennis Steckler	2nd unit photography
1963	The Sadist	James Landis	
1963	Living Between Two Worlds	Bobby Johnson	With Lee Strosnider
1964	What's Up Front!	Bob Wehling	
1964	The Time Travelers	Ib Melchior	
1964	The Nasty Rabbit	James Landis	
1965	Deadwood '76	James Landis	With Lew Guinn
1965	Tales of a Salesman	Don Russell	Uncredited
1965	Summer Children	James Bruner	
1965	Rat Fink	James Landis	
1965	Psycho A-Go-Go	Al Adamson	
1966	The Cat	Ellis Kadison	Director of photography: Nature unit
1967	The Road to Nashville	Will Zens	With Leif Rise
1967	Jennie: Wife/Child	Robert Carl Cohen; James Landis	
1968	The Name of the Game Is Kill!	Gunnar Hellström	
1969	The Fiend with the Electronic Brain	Al Adamson	Reused footage from Psycho A-Go-Go
1969	Five Bloody Graves	Al Adamson	
1969	Futz	Tom O'Horgan	
1969	The Monitors	Jack Shea	
1969	The Picasso Summer	Serge Bourguignon; Robert Sallin	
1970	Horror of the Blood Monsters	Al Adamson	With William G. Troiano
1971	The Ski Bum	Bruce D. Clark	
1971	Red Sky at Morning	James Goldstone	
1971	Blood of Ghastly Horror	Al Adamson	Reused footage from Psycho A-Go-Go
1971	McCabe & Mrs. Miller	Robert Altman	
1971	Dusty and Sweets McGee	Floyd Mutrux	Additional photography: Whisky a Go Go sequence
1971	The Hired Hand	Peter Fonda	
1972	Images	Robert Altman	
1972	Deliverance	John Boorman	
1973	The Long Goodbye	Robert Altman	
1973	Scarecrow	Jerry Schatzberg	
1973	Cinderella Liberty	Mark Rydell	
1974	The Sugarland Express	Steven Spielberg	
1974	The Girl from Petrovka	Robert Ellis Miller	
1975	Funny Lady	Herbert Ross	Uncredited; replaced by James Wong Howe
1976	Sweet Revenge	Jerry Schatzberg	
1976	Obsession	Brian De Palma	
1977	Close Encounters of the Third Kind	Steven Spielberg	
1978	The Deer Hunter	Michael Cimino	
1978	The Last Waltz	Martin Scorsese	Additional photography
1979	Winter Kills	William Richert	
1979	The Rose	Mark Rydell	
1980	Heaven's Gate	Michael Cimino	
1981	Blow Out	Brian De Palma	
1982	The Border	Tony Richardson	Additional photography
1982	Jinxed!	Don Siegel	
1983	Table for Five	Robert Lieberman	
1984	No Small Affair	Jerry Schatzberg	
1984	The River	Mark Rydell	
1985	Real Genius	Martha Coolidge	
1987	The Witches of Eastwick	George Miller	
1988	Journey to Spirit Island	László Pal	
1989	Fat Man and Little Boy	Roland Joffé	
1990	The Two Jakes	Jack Nicholson	
1990	The Bonfire of the Vanities	Brian De Palma	
1993	Sliver	Phillip Noyce	
1994	Intersection	Mark Rydell	
1994	Maverick	Richard Donner	
1995	The Crossing Guard	Sean Penn	
1995	Assassins	Richard Donner	
1996	The Ghost and the Darkness	Stephen Hopkins	
1998	Playing by Heart	Willard Carroll	
1998	Illegal Music	Zane Zidel	
2001	The Body	Jonas McCord	
2001	Life as a House	Irwin Winkler	
2002	Bánk bán	Csaba Káel	
2003	Timeline	Richard Donner	Director of photography: Los Angeles unit
2004	Jersey Girl	Kevin Smith	
2004	Melinda and Melinda	Woody Allen	
2006	The Black Dahlia	Brian De Palma	
2007	Cassandra's Dream	Woody Allen	
2010	You Will Meet a Tall Dark Stranger	Woody Allen	
2010	Louis	Dan Pritzker	
2011	The Maiden Danced to Death	Endre Hules	With Zoltan Honti
2013	Compulsion	Egidio Coccimiglio	
2014	Six Dance Lessons in Six Weeks	Arthur Allan Seidelman	

=== Acting roles ===
- Maverick (1994) - Albert Bierstadt
- Louis (2010) - Hungarian Photographer

== Short films ==
Year	Title	Director	Notes
1953	A Föld	József Zsuffa	
1955	Hajnal elött	József Zsuffa	
1967	1999 A.D.	Lee Madden	
1968	Prelude	John Astin	
1971	Threshold	J. Maynard Lovins; Stan Wells	
1975	Iron and Horse	Karl Bardosh	
1997	Fantasy for a New Age	Richard Caesar	
1999	The Argument	Donald Cammell	Filmed in 1971
2004	Medicine Chest	Douglas Busby	Video short
2012	Kickstart Theft	Fred Goodich	

== Television ==
Year	Title	Director	Notes
1969	The Bold Ones: The Protectors	Robert Day	Episode: "A Case of Good Whiskey at Christmas Time"
2012–14	The Mindy Project	Charles McDougall; Michael Weaver; Michael Spiller	Episodes: "Pilot", "Girl Next Door", "Danny and Mindy"

TV movies, miniseries, and specials

Year	Title	Director	Notes
1969	Baja Marimba Band	Bill Edwards	
1979	Flesh & Blood	Jud Taylor	
1992	Stalin	Ivan Passer	
2001	The Mists of Avalon	Uli Edel	
2006	Surrender, Dorothy	Charles McDougall	

== Documentary works ==
=== Feature films ===
Year	Title	Director	Notes
1957	Ungarn in Flammen	Stefan Erdélyi	With László Kovács and Ferencz Vass
1967	Mondo Mod	Peter Perry Jr.	With László Kovács
1969	Hot Rod Action	Gene McCabe	With Vilis Lapenieks and Mario Tosi
1972	Country Music	Robert Hinkle	With Gary Galbraith
1976	Death Riders	Jim Wilson	With Jim Wison
2000	Ljuset håller mig sällskap	Carl-Gustav Nykvist	
2007	Torn from the Flag	Endre Hules; Klaudia Kovacs	With Zoltan Honti, László Kovács and Justin Schein; Also executive producer
2014	God the Father	Simon Fellows	

=== Short films ===
Year	Title	Director
1963	Story of the Wholesale Produce Market	Leonard Greenberg

=== Television ===
Year	Title	Director	Notes
1965	The Market	Jack Shepard	
1968	The World of Animals: Big Cats, Little Cats	Bud Wiser	With John A. Alonzo, David Blewitt, Robert Grant, J. Barry Herron and Fred Kaplan
1980	Making Xanadu: The Musical Fantasy Movie	Alan Metter	With László Kovács
