= Arch Hall Sr. =

American actor (1908–1978)

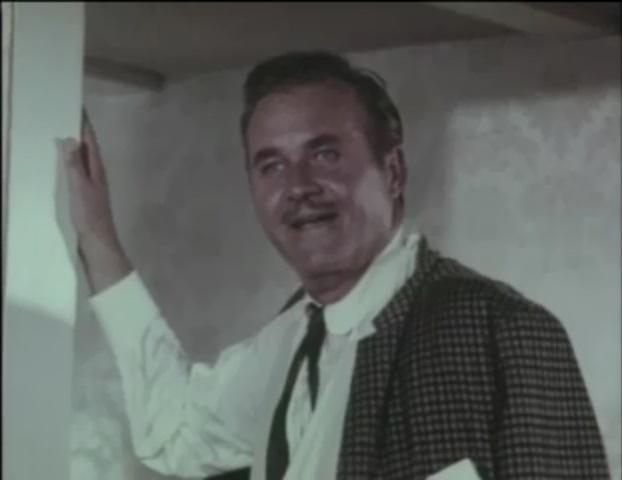
- Arch Hall Sr. in Eegah
- Born: Archibald Williams Hall; December 21, 1908; St. Louis, Missouri, U.S.
- Died: April 28, 1978 (aged 69); Los Angeles, California, U.S.
- Other names: Archie Hall; Arch Hall; Nicholas Meriwether; Nicholas Merriweather; Nicholas Merriwether; William Watters; Waa-toe-gala Oak-Shilla
- Occupations: Actor, screenwriter, director and film producer
- Years active: 1938–1974
- Spouse: Addalyn Pollitt (m. 1934–1978)
- Children: Arch Hall Jr.

Archibald Williams Hall (December 21, 1908 – April 28, 1978), known as Arch, was an American actor and filmmaker, best known for making a series of B-movies in the early 1960s starring his son, Arch Hall Jr. Hall used various names throughout his career including Nicholas Merriwether, William Waters, and Archie Hall.

== Early life and career ==
Hall was born in St. Louis, Missouri and grew up in South Dakota as a genuine cowboy. Hall spoke the Sioux language and had a Sioux name, "Waa-toe-gala Oak-Shilla" (translation: Wild Boy).

Hall graduated from the University of South Dakota, wrote for radio, interviewing elderly Native Americans on KOTA, and was a pilot in the United States Army Air Forces.

Hall then worked as a stuntman in Hollywood in the 1930s, a job which expanded into small acting roles in various films, usually Westerns. Hall formed his own movie studio, Fairway Productions, in Burbank, California. In the early 1960s, Fairway Productions made a series of B-films targeted towards the drive-in market, and were later hailed as some of the worst films ever made. They starred himself, his son Arch Jr., and his wife Addalyn, who would appear as a background extra or character actor. The sound was handled by Arch Jr. and his friend from high school, Alan O'Day, who later rose to notoriety as a writer of hit pop songs in the 1970s.

Hall's experience in the Air Force was satirized in The Last Time I Saw Archie, a 1961 film written by Bill Bowers (Hall's real-life platoon mate). The film starred Robert Mitchum as Archie Hall, alongside Jack Webb and France Nuyen, and was loosely based on Hall's experience in the army after being declared to be too old to fly fighters, but too inexperienced to fly bombers, leaving his only option to fly troop transport gliders. Hall allegedly sued the makers of the film for the unauthorized use of his name, leading to an out-of-court settlement. This was later reported to have merely been a publicity stunt engineered to give the film more newspaper coverage.

== Personal life ==
Hall married Addalyn Faye Pollitt (born June 5, 1906) who worked with Hall as a staff writer in Hall's radio days. During World War II, Addalyn was a Navy Inspector at Lockheed Aircraft. They had one child, Arch Hall Jr., born in 1943. The two would later separate but never officially divorce.

== Death ==
Hall died of a heart attack on April 28, 1978, in Los Angeles, and was buried with honors in a Sioux funeral in Philip, South Dakota. The service was presided over by the Lakota Sioux spiritual leader Frank Fools Crow.

Hall's life and times are extensively discussed in a 50-page interview with Arch Hall Jr. that appears in the 2005 book Earth vs. the Sci-Fi Filmmakers, by Tom Weaver, which was published by McFarland & Co. in North Carolina.

== Filmography ==
Year	Film	Role	Notes
1938	Dick Tracy Returns	Blackie, Phony Intern (Chs. 11–12)	Uncredited
1938	Overland Stage Raiders	Joe Waddell	Credited as Archie Hall
1938	The Mysterious Rider	Rancher Andrews	Credited as Arch Hall; Alternative title: Mark of the Avenger
1938	Rhythm of the Saddle	Rusty – Henchman in Stage	Credited as Archie Hall
1940	The Sagebrush Family Trails West	Jim Barton	Credited as Archie Hall; Alternative title: The Sagebrush Kid Goes West
1941	Two Gun Sheriff	Henchman Dunn	Credited as Archie Hall
1941	Tumbledown Ranch in Arizona	Rodeo announcer	Uncredited
1941	The Lone Rider in Ghost Town	Brent's partner	Credited as Archie Hall; Alternative title: Ghost Mine
1941	The Lone Rider in Frontier Fury	Clyde Barton	Credited as Archie Hall; Alternative title: Rangeland Racket & Frontier Fury
1941	Billy the Kid Wanted	Henchman	Uncredited
1942	Raiders of the West	Entertainer Tex	Uncredited
1942	The Lone Rider in Texas Justice	Trimmer Davis	Alternative title: Texas Justice
1945	His Brother's Ghost	Deputy Bentley	Credited as Archie Hall
1945	Apology for Murder	Paul	Credited as Archie Hall; Alternative title: Murder with Apology
1945	Border Badmen	Banker Gillian	Credited as Archie Hall
1961	Magic Spectacles	-	Producer; Alternative title: Tickled Pink
1961	The Choppers	Jim Bradford	Uncredited; Producer; Writer (as Arch Hall)
1962	Eegah	Robert Miller	Credited as William Watters; Alternative title: Eegah! The Name Written in Blood; Producer (as Nicholas Merriwether); Director and story (as Nicholas Merriwether)
1962	Wild Guitar	Mike McCauley	Credited as William Watters; Producer and writer (as Nicholas Merriwether)
1963	The Sadist	Opening Narration/Radio Announcer (Voice)	Uncredited; Alternative titles: Sweet Baby Charlie & Profile of Terror
1964	What's Up Front!	Cash Johnson	Credited as William Watters; Alternative titles: The Fall Guy & A Fourth for Marriage; Executive producer (as Nicholas Merriwether); Writer
1964	The Thrill Killers	-	Producer
1964	The Nasty Rabbit	Marshall Malout/Malcolm McKinley	Credited as William Watters; Alternative title: Spies-a-Go-Go; Producer (as Nicholas Merriwether)
1965	Deadwood '76	Boone May	Credited as William Watters; Producer (as Nicholas Meriwether); Story; Writer
1971	The Irv Carlson Show	Morrison Whales	Credited as Arch Hall; Alternative title: The Weird Ones; Producer; Writer
1972	The Corpse Grinders	-	Writer (as Arch Hall); Alternative title: The Flesh Grinders
1974	Thieves Like Us	Alvin	Credited as William Watters

== Sources ==
Earth vs. the Sci-Fi Filmmakers, a book by Tom Weaver, published by McFarland & Co. in North Carolina. ISBN 9780786422104, 0786422106
