= Alan O'Day =

American singer-songwriter (1940–2013)

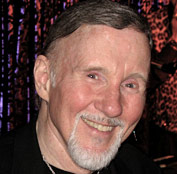
- O'Day in 2007

Background information
- Born: Alan Earle O'Day; October 3, 1940; Los Angeles, California, U.S.
- Died: May 17, 2013 (aged 72) Los Angeles, California, U.S.
- Genres: Pop rock
- Occupation: Singer-songwriter
- Instruments: Vocals, keyboards
- Years active: 1958–2013
- Label: Pacific Records
- Website: www.alanoday.com

Alan Earle O'Day (October 3, 1940 – May 17, 2013) was an American singer-songwriter, best known for writing and singing "Undercover Angel", a million-selling Gold-certified American No. 1 hit in 1977. He also wrote songs for many other notable performers, such as 1974's Helen Reddy No. 1 hit "Angie Baby" and "Rock and Roll Heaven" (originally by Climax and made famous by the Righteous Brothers). In the 1980s he moved from pop music to television, co-writing nearly 100 songs for the Saturday morning Muppet Babies series, and in the 1990s he wrote and performed music on the National Geographic series Really Wild Animals. O'Day also collaborated with Tatsuro Yamashita on a series of popular songs in Japan, including "Your Eyes", "Magic Ways", "Christmas Eve" and "Fragile" (which rapper Tyler, the Creator interpolated in "Gone, Gone / Thank You").

== Life and career ==
=== Early years ===
O'Day was born in Hollywood, California, United States, the only child of Earle and Jeannette O'Day, who both worked at the Pasadena Star-News. Earle took newspaper photos and did publicity for the Palm Springs Chamber of Commerce. Jeannette wrote for the Star News, as well as being a schoolteacher in Thermal, California, and other schools in the Coachella Valley.

O'Day said he remembered creating melodies on a xylophone at the age of six. By fifth grade, his favorite artist was Spike Jones and he was serenading classmates on the ukulele. At Coachella Valley Union High School, after participating in a band called The Imperials, he started his own band, The Shoves, heavily influenced by Jerry Lee Lewis, Ray Charles, Little Richard, Elvis Presley, and Fats Domino. It appeared on KABC-TV/Los Angeles's Hub Talent Show on August 25, 1958. A third band, The Renés (O'Day, Oscar Arias, Eddie Arias, Ernie Gurrola, Sal Velasquez, Johnny Alvarez and Don Duarte), played Latin and Mexican standards mixed with rock and roll tunes and gave O'Day the chance to write his own songs. In 1958, R&B pioneer Johnny Otis auditioned the Renés after a singer they were backing didn't pass muster. Impressed with their playing and O'Day's songs, Otis recorded and produced the band performing three O'Day originals and a few covers at El Dorado Studios in Hollywood over a few sessions, but the recordings were never released, as all the members of the Renés were minors.

In 1961, O'Day found work via a friend from high school, Arch Hall Jr., whose father, Arch Hall Sr., was an independent movie producer. The senior Hall wrote and produced films that starred the junior Hall, and O'Day helped out with the sound, in 1962 acting as music editor on the film Eegah and musical director on Wild Guitar, in 1963 as sound recorder on The Sadist, and in 1964 as sound mixer on What's Up Front! After Eegah, Hall Jr. and O'Day put together a four-piece band, The Archers, played in clubs on the Sunset Strip such as Whisky a Go Go and Pandora's Box, and served as the backing band for Dobie Gray.

Around 1965, O'Day was in the band Alan & Bob & Denny, a show group that did pop songs and some comedy. They played nightclubs in Pasadena and Hollywood, and were on The Ed Sullivan Show on November 14, 1965, as the backup band for singer-actress-comedian Virginia O'Brien.

=== Songwriter ===
In 1969, O'Day signed with E. H. Morris Music, followed by Warner Brothers Music in 1971, writing "The Drum", which became a hit single for Bobby Sherman. In 1974, three more of his songs did well: "Train of Thought", recorded by Cher, "Rock And Roll Heaven", recorded by The Righteous Brothers, and "Angie Baby", recorded by Helen Reddy.

"Angie Baby" hit No. 1 in December 1974 and became one of Reddy's biggest-selling singles. In a 2006 article, O'Day said the song took three months to write; originally, it was loosely based on the character in the Beatles' "Lady Madonna". To make the character ("Angie") more interesting, he based her on a neighbor girl he had known who seemed "socially retarded". O'Day also thought of his own childhood; an only child who was often ill, he spent many days in bed with a radio. O'Day showed the unfinished song to his therapist, who pointed out that the character's reactions were not those of a retarded person; O'Day then switched Angie from mentally "slow" to "crazy". This expanded to her living in a dream world of lovers, inspired by the songs on her radio. When an evil-minded neighbor tries to enter her room to take advantage of the girl, he is instead drawn into her reality, literally shrinking him down into her radio, "never to be found."

=== Solo career ===
O'Day released his first solo album, Caress Me Pretty Music, in 1973. It was not a major commercial success and he temporarily put his recording career on hiatus.

In 1977, the music publishing arm of Warner Brothers, Warner Chappell, formed Pacific Records as a label for their composers who also performed. O'Day was the first and only artist signed to the label, and its first release was "Undercover Angel." The song, which he called a "nocturnal novelette," was released in February 1977. Within a few months it had become No. 1 in the country, and has sold approximately two million copies. It was also a hit in Australia, reaching No. 9 on the Australian Singles Chart. ("Undercover Angel" also landed O'Day in an exclusive club as one of only a handful of writers/performers to pen a No. 1 hit for themselves and a No. 1 for another artist.)

A follow-up single, "Started Out Dancing, Ended Up Making Love" stalled at No. 73, marking O'Day's second and last appearance on the US chart. Three years later, in March 1980, a song called "Skinny Girls" reached No. 11 on the Australian Singles Chart. In 1981, O'Day co-wrote "Your Eyes" with singer-songwriter Tatsuro Yamashita, which became a hit in Japan. This was one of many collaborations between O'Day and Yamashita, including songs such as "Fragile" and "Theme From Big Wave".

O'Day left Warner Brothers in 1982 to write and self-publish. In 1983, he was invited to Tokyo to co-write six more songs with Yamashita for his album Big Wave. The collaboration yielded a Gold Disc Award in Japan.

In February 2013, the label 1st Phase Records released a new album titled Make Me Believe. Co-produced by Alan O'Day and Ken Kaufman featuring country music recording artist Paul Scott, including two new original songs co-written by O'Day: "Uh-Uh (What She Wants)," and an unofficial NASCAR national anthem titled "NASCAR CRAZY". NASCAR Crazy" is a co-write by O'Day and Kaufman.

=== Television ===
In 1983, O'Day met San Francisco's singer-songwriter Janis Liebhart, with whom he co-wrote a children's song for a new Saturday morning animated TV show, Jim Henson's Muppet Babies. Within eight years they had written almost 100 songs for the program, which won an Emmy Award, and has since been syndicated internationally.

The collaboration continued after Muppet Babies, as O'Day and Liebhart co-wrote for other children-focused projects, including National Geographic's Really Wild Animals, a series of videos which they helped produce and on which they also sang. They also worked on some children's products for Alaska Video.

O'Day lived in Nashville, to write and perform, and was also a musical and creative consultant. In 2012, he wrote and sang the title tune for the film You Don't Say.

=== Death ===
O'Day died on May 17, 2013, in Westwood, California, of brain cancer. He is interred at Coachella Valley Public Cemetery in Coachella, California.

== Awards ==
- "Angie Baby", US gold record
- "Undercover Angel", US gold record
- "Muppet Babies", nominated for an Emmy Award
- "Really Wild Animals", Parents' Choice Award
- "Big Wave" Tatsuro Yamashita collaboration, Gold Disk Award, Japan

== Discography ==
=== Albums ===
- 1973: Songs by Alan O'Day (vol. 1)
- 1973: Caress Me Pretty Music
- 1977: Appetizers
- 1979: Oh Johnny!
- 1994: Music from National Geographic's Really Wild Animals, (Janis Liebhart & Alan O'Day)
- 2001: Undercover Angel 2001 (City Man Music, BMI, Warner/Chappell Music, ASCAP 634479217920)
- 2008: I Hear Voices

=== Singles ===
- 1964: "I Want a Girl for Xmas" (as Alan O'Day & the Knights)
- 1970: "Heavy Church" / "House on Sunrise Avenue" (co-produced by Snuff Garrett)
- 1973: "Somewhere She Is Sleeping" (produced by Dallas Smith)
- 1977: "Undercover Angel" / "Just You" (#1 U.S., #1 CAN, #4 NZ, #9 AUS, #43 UK)
- 1977: "Started Out Dancing, Ended Up Making Love" / "Angie Baby" (#73 U.S., #39 NZ, #72 CAN)
- 1977: "Soldier of Fortune" (#103 U.S.)
- 1978: "Satisfied"
- 1979: "Oh Johnny!" / "People Who Talk to Themselves" (#124 U.S.)
- 1980: "Skinny Girls" / "Oh Johnny!" (#11 AUS, #110 U.S.) (above six produced by Steve Barri)
- 2008: "I Hear Voices"
- 2012: "You Don't Say"

=== Credits ===
- "Theme from Eegah", 1961 (co-written and recorded by Arch Hall Jr & the Archers)
- "Wild Guitar", 1962 (co-written and recorded by Arch Hall Jr & the Archers)
- "Yes I Will", 1962 (recorded by Arch Hall Jr & the Archers)
- "Funky Funky Feelin", 1964 (recorded by Dobie Gray)
- "No Top (Just a Suit)", 1964 co-written by Charlene Groman (recorded by Danny Hamilton)
- "Back to Oklahoma", 1970 (recorded by Ned Miller)
- "Heavy Church", 1970 (recorded by Three Dog Night and Al Wilson)
- "House on Sunrise Avenue", 1970 (recorded by Bonnie Guitar)
- "American Movie", 1971 (recorded by Peggy Lee not-yet-released)
- "Are You Old Enough", 1971 (recorded by Mark Lindsay)
- "Caress Me Pretty Music", 1971 (recorded by David Clayton-Thomas, Susan Hart, Dewey Martin, Anne Murray, Patrick Norman, Tony Orlando & Dawn, Lon Satton, Bobby Sherman, & Foster Sylvers,)
- "The Drum", 1971 (recorded by Bobby Sherman), No. 29 U.S. (Other recordings by Marti Caine, Pete Fountain, Lill-Babs & the Mills Brothers)
- "Gifts", 1971 (recorded by Bells, Tony Christie, Saori Minami & Bobby Sherman as "Tonight I Chipped a Piece Off of the Sun")
- "Good Time Song", 1971 co-written with Artie Wayne (recorded by Bobby Sherman)
- "You Better Start Singing Soon", 1971 (recorded by Mike Clifford)
- "American Family", 1972 (recorded by Larry Carlton, Raiders, & the Vogues)
- "Easy Evil" 1972 (recorded by Long John Baldry, Sonny Bottari U.S. #139, Captain & Tennille, Larry Carlton, Climax, Coven, Jackie DeShannon, Friends of Distinction, Patsy Gallant, Gary Glitter, Bobby Hart, Hedva & David, Marcia Hines, Mieko Hirota, Walter Jackson, John Kay U.S. #92, Peggy Lee, Lettermen, Lulu, New Birth, Johnny Nicol, Tony Orlando & Dawn, Genya Ravan, Merl Saunders, Marlena Shaw, Nancy Sinatra, Dusty Springfield, Sugarloaf, Sylvia U.S. R&B #61, Three Dog Night, Sarah Vaughan, John Travolta, Travis Wammack U.S. #85 and Nancy Wilson, among others)
- "Spin Away", 1972 (recorded by Lettermen, Saori Minami & Ted Neeley)
- "Day Becomes Night", 1973 (recorded by Bobby Sherman)
- "Dirty Movies", 1973 (recorded by Flash Cadillac)
- "Do Me Wrong, But Do Me", 1973 (recorded by Mel Carter, Chris Christian, Homo-sapiens, Jack Jones, Johnny Mathis, Megan McDonough, Julie Rogers, Wilma Reading & not-yet-released Barbra Streisand)
- "Flashback", 1973 (recorded by The 5th Dimension, co-written with Artie Wayne, #82 US, #30 US AC, #75 US R&B, #60 Australia) (Other recordings by Paul Anka #100 U.S., Cilla Black, Blue Swede, Cher, Stein Ingebrigtsen, Tom Jones, & Bjorn Skifs)
- "Get It Off, Get It On", 1973 (recorded by Saori Minami, produced by George Clinton)
- "Like A Main Theme", 1973 (recorded by Nana Mouskouri)
- "Rubberene", 1973 co-written with Mat Camison & Maurice Vidalin (recorded by Davy Jones)
- "Angie Baby", 1974 (recorded by Helen Reddy), No. 1 U.S., produced by Joe Wissert. (Other recordings by James Collins (Songwriter), Ray Conniff, Chelsea Cullen, Syd Dale, Barbara Dickson, Anne Lise Gjostel, George Greeley, Dick Heckstall-Smith, Hanne Krogh as "Rare Lina", Stephanie Lai as "Mo Wei Ai Shang Be!", Reg Livermore, Paul Mauriat, Pete Moore, Erick Sermon on "Hip Hop Radio", Uncle Devil Show & Sylvie Vartan.)
- "Every Man Wants Another Man's Woman", 1974 (recorded by Dee Dee Bridgewater, Gene Redding & Sami Jo).
- "Real Emotion", 1974 (recorded by Anne Murray)
- "Rock and Roll Heaven", 1974, co-written by Johnny Stevenson (recorded by The Righteous Brothers), No. 3 U.S., produced by Dennis Lambert, Eddie Lambert, and Brian Potter. (Other recordings by Climax No. 102 U.S. Flash Cadillac, Sonny Geraci, Ricky May, Ronnie McDowell/Bill Medley/John Schneider as "Country Heaven" and Zdravko Colic.)
- "Rock 'n' Roll ABC's", 1974 (recorded by Freddie Cannon No. 107 U.S.)
- "Train of Thought", 1974 (recorded by Cher) – No. 18 U.S., No. 22 Canada, produced by Snuff Garrett. (Other recordings by Gene Pitney, Steppenwolf & Sylvia Vartan)
- "Annie Annie Over", 1975 (recorded by Steppenwolf)
- "Blue Finger Lou", 1975 (recorded by Anne Murray) (Also recorded by Vicki Brown, Bobby Edwards, Family Four, Donny Most, Tony Orlando & Dawn, & Gro Anita Schonn, )
- "Catch My Breath", 1977 (recorded by Helen Reddy & Anne Murray)
- "I Know Who I Am", 1977 (recorded by Robin Frederick)
- "Undercover Angel", 1977 (recorded by Leslie Cheung, Jurgen Drews as "Unnahbarer Engel", Grethe Kausland, Pete Moore, Wess as "Se Non Fossi Matto", Kari Tapio as "Unten Enkelit" & Sylvie Vartan as "Mon Ciel de Lit".)
- "Satisfied", 1978 (recorded by Mary MacGregor)
- "Love at First Night", 1979 (recorded by Kim Hart, Australia Top 10, New Zealand Top 20)
- "Every Night", 1980 (co-written and recorded by Tatsuro Yamashita) (Also recorded by Mariya Takeuchi)
- "Dear Daisy", 1982 (recorded by Sonny Shroyer)
- "Your Eyes", 1982 (co-written and recorded by Tatsuro Yamashita) (Also recorded by Jun Fukamachi, Marilyn Martin, Bonnie Pink, Diane Reeves,& Mariya Takeuchi,)
- "I Love You Eyes", 1983 (recorded by Ray Price)
- "Talk Crazy to Me", 1983 co-written by Margaret Harris (recorded by Girl Talk, Mie & Pia Zadora)
- "Ballad 20 (The Next Thing To You)" co-written by Major Stanfield & Kazuko Kobayashi (recorded by Masahiko Kondo)
- "Hungry", 1984 co-written by K.A. Parker (recorded by Mie & Priscilla Wright)
- "I Love You (Part 2), 1984 (co-written and recorded by Tatsuro Yamashita) (Also recorded by 14 Karat Soul)
- "Jody", 1984 (co-written and recorded by Tatsuro Yamashita) (Also recorded by Jeffrey Foskett, & Kalapana)
- "Magic Ways", 1984 (co-written and recorded by Tatsuro Yamashita)
- "Only With You", 1984 (co-written and recorded by Tatsuro Yamashita) (Also recorded by Jeffrey Foskett)
- "Theme from the Big Wave", 1984 (co-written and recorded by Tatsuro Yamashita)
- "Mermaid", 1985 (co-written and recorded by Tatsuro Yamashita)
- "One Step Beyond", 1985 co-written by Steven A. Williams (recorded by Arashi & Shonentai)
- "Lady Blue", 1986 (co-written and recorded by Tatsuro Yamashita) (Also recorded by Tom Keane)
- "Replace the Face", 1987 (recorded by Dave Mason & Steppenwolf)
- "Girl in White," 1988 (co-written and recorded by Tatsuro Yamashita) (Also recorded by 14 Karat Soul & Tom Keane)
- "Love and Let Live" 1988 (recorded by Olivia Newton-John)
- "Christmas Eve (English version)", 1991 (co-written and recorded by Tatsuro Yamashita) (Other recordings by All 4 One, Beni, Commodores, Charlie Green, Eric Martin, Idina Menzel, Modern Folk Quartet & Pentatonix)
- "Get Back in Love", 1992 co-written by Tatsuro Yamashita. (recorded by 14 Karat Soul)
- "There's Only One Ariel" 1992 co-written by Janis Liebhart (recorded by Kath Souci/Aleta Braxton/Angie Jaree/Janis Liebart/Susie Stevens on Little Mermaid: Songs from the Sea)
- "Fish", 1996 co-written by Tatsuro Yamashita (recorded by Jeffrey Foskett)
- "Fragile", 1998 (co-written and recorded by Tatsuro Yamashita) (Interpolated by Tyler, the Creator in "Gone, Gone / Thank You").
- "Wangan Skier (Here We Go Now)", 1998 co-written by Tatsuro Yamashita (recorded by Shonentai), No. 15 Japan
- "Love Can Go the Distance", 2000 (co-written and recorded by Tatsuro Yamashita), No. 18 Japan (Also recorded by Jeffrey Foskett)
- "My Summer Love", 2005 co-written by Yoshiyuki Sahashi (recorded by Emi Fujita)
- "Window Shopping", 2005 co-written by Seiji Kameda (recorded by Emi Fujita)
- "Angel of the Light", 2008 (co-written and recorded by Tatsuro Yamashita), No. 4 Japan
- "Shy Boy", 2008 (co-written and recorded by Ryan Laird)
- "Elmo Didn't Mean To", 2011, co-written by Christine Ferraro & Janis Liebhart (Recorded by Elmo)

== See also ==
- List of 1970s one-hit wonders in the United States
