= Judit Selymes =

American poet

Judit (Ilosvay) Selymes (February 18, 1940, in Budapest – February 7, 2024) was a Hungarian-American theater director, writer and poet. She died in Riverside, CA in 2024.

== Biography ==
As the only female director of her class, she attended the Hungarian Academy of Theater and Film (Színház – és Filmművészeti Főiskola), led by Kálmán Nádasdy, graduating in 1963. As her graduation project, she directed Ida regénye by Géza Gárdonyi in Kecskemét. After receiving her diploma, she was employed at the National Theater in Pécs (Pécsi Nemzeti Színház).

From 1967 until 1972, she was employed by the Hungarian National Radio and Television (Magyar Rádió és Televízió) and worked on numerous television and radio series as director, writer, screenwriter and editor. She also wrote lyrics for songs and chansons. She was a major contributor to the television series on The History of Hungarian Sculpture, The History of Hungarian Painting, and The History of Hungarian Architecture. She also adapted a Thomas Mann short story for television. She directed Iván Darvas (as a lead) in a version of Catch-22 by Joseph Heller and collaborated with many other well-known Hungarian artists, including: Academy Award nominee Lajos Koltai, Zoltán Latinovits, Miklós Gábor, Éva Ruttkai, Lajos Básti, Tamás Major, György Bárdy, ibor Bitskey, Erzsi Máté and Itala Békés.

In 1972, she left communist Hungary for the West. From 1974 to 1975, she was a writer and newscaster for the Hungarian section of Voice of America while also writing for Radio Free Europe. Concerned about her refugee status, at the time she used the name of "Judit Lőrinci."

In 1974, she came second (out of 400 entries) in the poetry competition held by the U.S.-based Hungarian Publication, Új Világ, for her piece titled June Prayer. She frequently published under the name Judit Selymes Ilosvay. Her poetry was part of the curriculum at San Jose State University.

In 1975, she published her own collection of poetry titled Half Way and toured the United States and Canada with her writing. Frequently performing with other Hungarian poets, she met György Faludy, becoming lifetime friends. Living in Los Angeles, she created her own theater: Pocket Stage. She received a favorable review from the Los Angeles Times for her direction of The Dumb Waiter by Harold Pinter. Later she was hired as a professor by the California State University – Los Angeles where she directed Cicero by Upton Sinclair, receiving an "Outstanding Direction" certificate. She also taught acting and directed at the Rita Hayworth Theater at the Gower & Sunset Film Studio. Her students and fellow directors referred to Judit Selymes as an acting teacher who could "make an actor out of a mummy." She coached many actors, included Begonya Plaza.

Along with directing, she continued to write for the screen and theater. She authored several songs lyrics; even appearing on an LP. As a co-writer and director she worked on an original comedy What Are Neighbors For?, premiering at the Little Oscar Theater.

She also collaborated with Jeri Greene on the original play, Bunco. She contributed as a consultant and translator to Klaudia Kovacs' eight-time award-winning documentary Torn from the Flag.

She died on February 7, 2024.
