= Eegah =

1962 film by Arch Hall Sr. (as Nicholas Merriwether)

- Theatrical release poster
- Directed by: Arch Hall Sr. (as Nicholas Merriwether)
- Screenplay by: Bob Wehling
- Story by: Arch Hall Sr. (as Nicholas Merriwether)
- Produced by: Arch Hall Sr. (as Nicholas Merriwether)
- Starring: Arch Hall, Jr.; Marilyn Manning; Richard Kiel
- Cinematography: Vilis Lapenieks
- Edited by: Don Schneider
- Music by: André Brummer
- Color process: Eastman Color
- Production company: Fairway International Pictures
- Distributed by: Fairway International Pictures
- Release date: June 8, 1962
- Running time: 92 minutes
- Country: United States
- Language: English
- Budget: $15,000

Eegah (1962) by Arch Hall

Eegah (sometimes stylized as Eegah! and also known as Eegah: The Name Written in Blood) is a 1962 American horror film directed by Arch Hall Sr. (as Nicholas Merriwether) and starring Arch Hall Jr., Marilyn Manning and Richard Kiel.

Often considered to be among the worst films ever made, Eegah was listed in the 1978 book The Fifty Worst Films of All Time, and was featured in a 1993 episode of Mystery Science Theater 3000 and a 2010 episode of Elvira's Movie Macabre.

== Plot ==
One night after shopping, Roxy Miller is driving to a party through the California desert when she nearly crashes into Eegah, a giant prehistoric caveman. She tells her boyfriend Tom Nelson and her father Robert Miller about the giant. Her father, a writer of adventure books, decides to go into the desert to look for the creature and possibly photograph it. When his helicopter ride fails to show up at the designated pickup time, Tom and Roxy go looking for him in his dune buggy.

Roxy is soon kidnapped by Eegah and taken back to his cave while Tom searches for her. In Eegah's cave, Roxy is reunited with her father, who has been captured as well. He tells her that he has begun to communicate with the caveman and has developed a theory as to the creature's astounding longevity. Eegah begins to express what seems to be a romantic interest in Roxy. Her father, fearful that the creature may kill them both if he is rebuffed, suggests she endure as much of it as she can bear. Eegah remains relatively tame, however, and Roxy even ends up giving him a shave, which distracts him long enough until Tom arrives and helps the Millers escape.

Enraged, Eegah follows them back to civilization to seek revenge. He goes on a rampage through the town until he finally locates Roxy, and attempts to kidnap her from a party. The police soon arrive and confront Eegah, who is shot and killed.

== Cast ==
- Arch Hall Jr. as Tom Nelson
- Marilyn Manning as Roxy Miller
- Richard Kiel as Eegah
- Arch Hall Sr. as Robert Miller
- Clay Stearns as Band Member
- Bob Davis as George
- Deke Richards as Band Member
- Ron Shane as Detective
- Addalyn Pollitt as George's Wife
- Lloyd Williams as Mr. Kruger, Helicopter Pilot
- Ray Dennis Steckler as Mr. Fishman
- Bill Rice as Chef
- Carolyn Brandt as Fishman's Girl

== Production ==
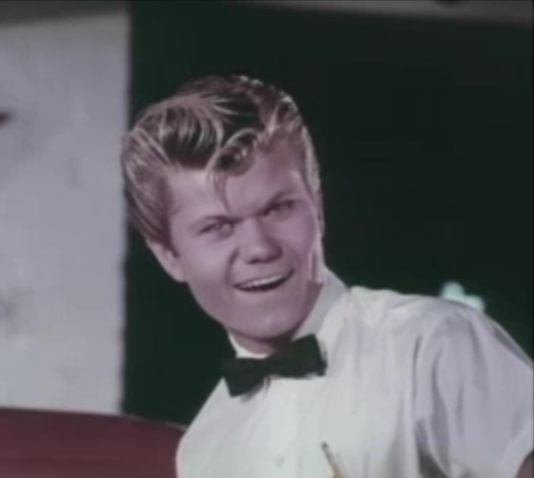
Arch Hall Jr. plays the main protagonist in this cult classic.

Following the financial success of his first venture into the drive-in/juvenile delinquency genre, The Choppers, Arch Hall Sr. was able to fund Eegah, a starring vehicle for his son, Arch Hall Jr., who had some success with songwriter Alan O'Day on the rock and roll/surf rock scene in Los Angeles. Hall Sr. co-wrote the film with Bob Wehling, directed the picture under the pseudonym Nicholas Merriweather, and co-starred opposite his son under the name William Watters. While the library music used to underscore the picture was supplied by André Brummer (under the name Henri Price), an uncredited O'Day ended up being the music editor on Eegah.

Hall Sr. looked to create an Elvis Presley-style screen persona for his son and made sure that Eegah was peppered with various rock and roll songs (including two songs he wrote called "Vicky" and "Valerie"). The film attempts elements of traditional schlock-horror and youth-comedy genres and anticipates the 1960s "beach party" genre. One of the members of the rock and roll band shown in the film was Deke Lussier, who, as Deke Richards, later became a highly respected songwriter and record producer at Motown Records.

Hall Sr.'s company, Fairway-International Pictures, located in Burbank, California, was also Hall's place of residence and doubled for a number of locations in the picture, including the Millers' apartment.

Assistant cameraman Ray Dennis Steckler appears in the picture as Mr. Fischer, the man at the hotel who is thrown into the pool near the end of the picture. Steckler, who had previously moved to Hollywood to become a cameraman, made his directing debut the next year in the Arch Hall Jr. vehicle Wild Guitar. Steckler's first independent feature, The Incredibly Strange Creatures Who Stopped Living and Became Mixed-Up Zombies, was later distributed by Fairway-International.

== Reception and legacy ==
Often considered to be one of the worst films ever made, the film has a rare approval rating of 0% on Rotten Tomatoes, with 8 critical reviews. The first real notoriety the film had past its initial release was being included in the 1978 book The Fifty Worst Films of All Time. In his Classic Movie Guide, film critic Leonard Maltin awarded the film a "bomb," his lowest rating possible, calling it "A staple at 'All-Time Worst Film' festivals." Writing in DVD Talk, critic Ian Jane described the film as "terrible in all the right ways" and "about as bottom of the barrel as they come."

The film is listed in Golden Raspberry Award founder John Wilson's book The Official Razzie Movie Guide as one of the "100 Most Enjoyably Bad Movies Ever Made."

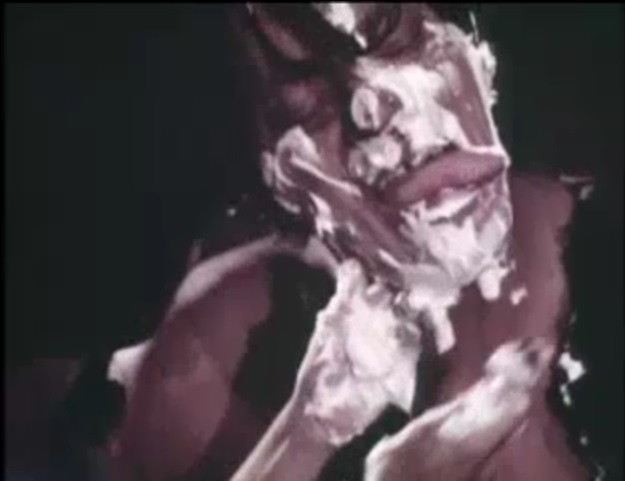
A still from the infamous scene where Eegah licks shaving cream

In 1993, Eegah was featured on Comedy Central's cult television series Mystery Science Theater 3000 (MST3K) and became a fan favorite. In the published episode guide to the series, The Mystery Science Theater 3000 Amazing Colossal Episode Guide (ISBN 0-553-37783-3), the cast considers the shaving scene—in which Eegah lolls his tongue around and laps up shaving cream—to be one of the most disgusting things they have witnessed during their time on the show. The writers also speculate that some kind of romantic relationship existed between Arch Hall Sr. and his on-screen daughter Marilyn Manning, due to the uncomfortably non-familial chemistry in their scenes together. One of the film's more inept moments became a running joke on the show: Hall Sr.'s line "Watch out for snakes!" is blurted out despite a lack of visual source for the dialog.

In 2009, Eegah was featured in a season five episode of the television series Cinema Insomnia.

=== Home media ===
The film is in the public domain and has been released on home video a number of times, both as stand-alone versions and as part of multi-film collections.

The MST3K version of the movie was released on DVD in March 2000 by Rhino Home Video. It was reissued on DVD by Shout Factory on May 22, 2018, as part of The Singles Collection. "The Gizmoplex" was launched to the public on May 8, 2022, a new headquarters for all things Mystery Science Theater 3000, with the Eegah episode being made available for purchase in digital streaming format directly from gizmoplex.com. As of 2024, it is available to watch for free (with ads) on YouTube.

The Cinema Insomnia episode featuring the film was released on DVD by Apprehensive Films on April 13, 2009.

On November 1, 2019, The Film Detective announced a new 4K restoration of Eegah would be released on DVD and Blu-ray on November 26, 2019, with the Blu-ray being a limited edition of only 1,500 copies in collaboration with Shout Factory, Something Weird Video, and Cinema Preservation Alliance. Special features included subtitles, the complete MST3K version of the movie, an interview with MST3K creator Joel Hodgson, and an interview with star Arch Hall Jr.

== See also ==
- List of American films of 1962
