= The Maiden Danced to Death =

2011 film

- Film poster
- Directed by: Endre Hules
- Written by: Endre Hules
- Produced by: Gabor Garami; Michael A. Dobbin; Igor Pedicek
- Starring: Endre Hules; Deborah Kara Unger; Stephen McHattie; Gil Bellows
- Cinematography: Zoltan Honti; Vilmos Zsigmond
- Edited by: Mark Adam
- Music by: Ferenc Kiss; David Burns
- Release dates: 4 May 2011 (Hungary); 25 August 2011 (Canada); 3 October 2011 (Slovenia)
- Running time: 107 minutes
- Countries: Canada; Hungary; Slovenia
- Languages: Hungarian; English

The Maiden Danced to Death (Hungarian: A halálba táncoltatott leány) is a 2011 Hungarian-language independent drama film written, starring, directed by Endre Hules. The film is a Hungarian-Slovenian-Canadian co-production filmed on-location in all three countries. It was one of the six films shortlisted for the Hungarian entry for the Best Foreign Language Oscar at the 85th Academy Awards.

== Cast ==
- Endre Hules as Steve Court
- Bea Melkvi as Mari Udvaros
- Deborah Kara Unger as Lynn Court
- Zsolt László as Gyula Udvaros Jr
- Stephen McHattie as Ernie
- Emöke Zsigmond as Gabi
- Gil Bellows as Fred
- István Zámbó as Feri
- Boris Cavazza as Gyula Udvaros Sr.
