= Klaudia Kovács (director) =

Hungarian film director

- Born: Eger, Hungary
- Occupations: Film and theater director

Klaudia Kovács is a Hungarian film and theater director, known for her documentary Torn from the Flag (2007).

== Early life ==
Kovacs was born in Eger, Hungary. She is the daughter of Olympian swimmer, Eva Erdelyi.

== Career ==
Kovacs began her career as an actor at the Harlekin Children's Theater in Budapest, and continued at Pinceszínház (Cellar Theater) in Hungary. She then moved to Hollywood, California, where she studied with actress Lynn Redgrave and worked in theater, film, and television in Los Angeles and New York, including an appearance in I Spy.

Her best-known work as a director is the sociopolitical, historical documentary Torn from the Flag (Hungarian: A lyukas zászló), made with cinematographers Vilmos Zsigmond and László Kovács, which focuses on the 1956 Hungarian Revolution and its significance in the Cold War. The documentary's production was announced at the United States Congress.

Kovacs also worked on the feature-length film, Panic Nation, investigating state-sponsored and federal immigration laws.

In 2013, Kovacs directed the one-woman show, Calling America: Don't Hang Up!!, at Theater Row in New York's Broadway District.

== Writing ==
Kovacs has also written several Hungarian Panorama articles and a co-written two Hungarian language books: Hungarian America (2002), and Portrait Gallery of Hungarian Americans (2003).

== Awards ==
1. City of Los Angeles - Certificate of Celebration for Contribution to Cinema, Art and Culture (Panic Nation)
2. Republic of Hungary - Hero of the Freedom Fight Award (Torn from the Flag)
3. AFI (American Film Institute) FEST Milestone Selection (Torn from the Flag)
4. Panavision’s Young Filmmaker's Program (Torn from the Flag)
5. Technicolor Sponsorship (Torn from the Flag)
6. Alliance of Women Directors’ Television Shadowing Program, 2012
7. CINE Eagle Award - Best Independent Documentary (Torn from the Flag)
8. CINE Eagle Award - Best Independent Documentary (Panic Nation)
9. Beverly Hills Hi-Def Film Festival - First place (Torn from the Flag)
10. Broadway International Film Festival - Best Documentary (Panic Nation)
11. Mexico International Film Festival – Golden Palm Award for Feature-Length Documentary (Panic Nation)
12. Nevada Film Festival - Gold Reel Award - Documentary Film Competition (Touche: A Blind Fencer's Story)
13. Tiburon International Film Festival - Golden Reel Award (Torn from the Flag)
14. Minneapolis/ St. Paul International Film Festival - Best of the Fest Award (Torn from the Flag)
15. Noches de Oklahoma - Special Recognition by the Latino Community (Panic Nation)
16. New York Spotlight On Festival Award - Best Ensemble Cast (The Insanity of Mary Girard)
17. Ventura County Reporter - REP Award for Excellence in Production (The Comedy of Errors)
18. Indianapolis International Film Festival - Audience Award - Best Documentary - third Place (Torn from the Flag)
19. DocUtah International Documentary Film Festival - Audience Favorite Top Ten Award (Panic Nation)
20. Seattle True Independent Film Festival - Best Documentary Feature (Touche: A Blind Fencer's Story)
21. BeeKay Theater Annual Playwright's Festival - Golden Apple Award (Bill & Coo)
22. Slow Film International Film Festival - Special Prize of the City of Eger (Torn from the Flag)
23. Slow Film International Film Festival - Special Prize of Agria Television (Torn from the Flag)
24. Slow Film International Film Festival - Festival's Special Award (Torn from the Flag)
25. Hungarian Freedom Fighters World Federation - Certificate of Recognition (Torn from the Flag)
26. International Technology Institute - Memorial Medal (Torn from the Flag)
27. Corvina Cultural Circle - Certificate of Recognition
28. Thalia Studios - Certificate of Recognition - 20 Year Anniversary (Gloria Victis)
29. Thalia Studios - Certificate of Recognition - 10 Year Anniversary (Gloria Victis)
30. Torrance Cable Television - Best Short Nomination (Gems)
