= Harper MacKay =

American pianist and composer

Harper MacKay (October 13, 1921 — June 2, 1995) was an American pianist, music director, and composer and arranger of music for television and film. He was the longtime music director of the Los Angeles Civic Light Opera and was also the music director for singer Ann Blyth; serving as her arranger and accompanist in concert. He was also music director and accompanist for comedienne Phyllis Diller and for lyricist Sammy Cahn; the latter of whom toured nationally in concerts singing his own music. He was the music director for The Julie Andrews Show and the NBC Follies in addition to serving as arranger and music supervisor for The Gong Show and television specials featuring celebrity entertainers.

== Life and career ==
Born in Boston, MacKay earned a bachelor's degree from Harvard University before earning a doctorate of music from the University of Southern California. In 1962 he was appointed music director of the Los Angeles Civic Light Opera; a post he remained in through 1980. He produced several film scores during his career, writing music for the movies Deadwood '76 (1965), Guess What We Learned in School Today? (1970), and Cry Uncle! (1971). He also composed music for a total of nine Bugs Bunny cartoon specials for television. His other music for television included music for The Delphi Bureau, Men at Law, and a 1966 television adaptation of Alice Through the Looking-Glass.

In addition to his work as a composer, MacKay also served as music director and/or arranger for several television programs; including The Julie Andrews Show, the NBC Follies, The Gong Show, and television specials starring Carol Channing, Danny Thomas, and Petula Clark.

MacKay was married to singer Margery MacKay, who notably sang the songs "Maria" and "Climb Ev'ry Mountain" in the 1965 film The Sound of Music, dubbing the voice of Peggy Wood. He died of a heart attack in Los Angeles on June 2, 1995.
