= Torn from the Flag =

Torn from the Flag: a film by Klaudia Kovacs
- Directed by: Endre Hules; Klaudia Kovacs
- Written by: Endre Hules; Klaudia Kovacs - Story
- Produced by: George Adams - Associate Producer; Klaudia Kovacs - Producer; Laszlo Kovacs - Executive Producer; Andrew Senyei - Executive Producer; Vilmos Zsigmond - Executive Producer
- Cinematography: Zoltan Honti; László Kovács
- Music by: Chris Horvath
- Distributed by: Homage to 1956, LLC.
- Release date: November 10, 2007 (AFI Los Angeles)
- Running time: 96 minutes
- Country: United States
- Languages: English, Russian, Italian, Hungarian

Torn from the Flag: a Film by Klaudia Kovacs is a 2007 documentary film about the international decline of communism and the 1956 Hungarian Revolution. The film encompasses the tense Cold War era (1945–1991) and presents the rivalry of the superpowers during that time. It shows the 1956 Hungarian Revolution as the first catalyst for the future decline of the communist system, and as a remarkable turning point for the advancement of democracy. The film's Hungarian title is A lyukas zászló.

Interviewees include: Otto von Habsburg, Henry Kissinger, William Taubman, Arpad Goncz, George Vassiliou, and Imre Pozsgay

Torn from the Flag: a Film by Klaudia Kovacs was made primarily for international theatrical release and television distribution.

== Accolades ==
The film's world premiere was in Hollywood, in the American Film Institute’s film festival, AFI Fest. It was screened in the festival’s "Milestones" section—described as "celebrating the best of the best"—along with films by Ingmar Bergman and Michelangelo Antonioni. Tickets for the premiere sold out in 45 minutes, and the film received a standing ovation. To date, the film has been invited to participate in 20 festivals, and is the recipient of 8 awards and recognition.

Torn from the Flag: a Film by Klaudia Kovacs was invited to and presented at the United States Congress by U.S. Representative Tom Lantos and was entered into the Congressional Record.

Teach with Movies, a non-profit organization that encourages schools to use films as educational tools, selected Torn from the Flag as "an excellent supplement to units on the Cold War."

European Studies and the Department of Government at Cornell University invited the film for a special screening along with the filmmaker, Klaudia Kovacs. UCLA Extension, Osher Institute followed suit and included Torn from the Flag: a Film by Klaudia Kovacs in their Winter Course, 2025.
