= The Nasty Rabbit =

1964 film by James Landis

- Directed by: James Landis
- Screenplay by: Arch Hall Sr. (as Arch Hall); Jim Critchfield
- Produced by: Arch Hall Sr. (as Nicholas Merriweather)
- Starring: Misha Terr; Arch Hall Jr
- Cinematography: Vilmos Zsigmond (as William Zsigmond)
- Edited by: Anthony M. Lanza
- Color process: Technicolor
- Production company: Rushmore Productions
- Distributed by: Fairway International Pictures
- Release date: December 1964
- Running time: 90 minutes
- Country: United States
- Language: English

The Nasty Rabbit (also known as Spies a-Go-Go) is a 1964 American Techniscope spy comedy film directed by James Landis and starring Misha Terr and Arch Hall Jr.

== Plot ==
A Russian submarine lands one of their agents disguised as a cowboy carrying a rabbit that is carrying a deadly virus. The Soviets plan for the rabbit to infect the United States through breeding with American rabbits with the goal of killing large numbers of Americans.

== Cast ==
- Michael Terr as Mischa Lowzoff (as Mischa Terr)
- Arch Hall Jr. as Britt Hunter
- Liz Renay as Cecelia Solomon (as Melissa Morgan)
- Arch Hall Sr. as Marshall Malout / Malcolm McKinley (as William Watters)
- Hal Bizzy as Heinrich Krueger
- Jack Little as Maxwell Stoppie
- Ray Vegas as Pancho Gonzales
- John Akana as Col. Kobayaski
- Sharon Ryker as Jackie Gavin
- Hal Bokar as Gavin

== Production ==
Richard Kiel stated in an interview with Tom Weaver that the lead composer Mischa "Michael" Terr financed the film. Arch Hall Jr. recalled that Terr wished to be an actor with Arch Hall Sr. writing the film about a Russian character. Pat and Lolly Vegas later formed the group Redbone.

== Soundtrack ==
- "The Robot Walk" (Written by Lolly Vegas and Pat Vegas)
- "Jackie" (Written by Lolly Vegas and Pat Vegas)
- "The Spy Waltz" (Written by Lolly Vegas and Pat Vegas)
- "The Jackrabbit Shuffle" (Written by Lolly Vegas and Pat Vegas)

== See also ==
- List of American films of 1964
