= Global Cinematography Institute =

Coordinates: 34.0546°N 118.2603°W

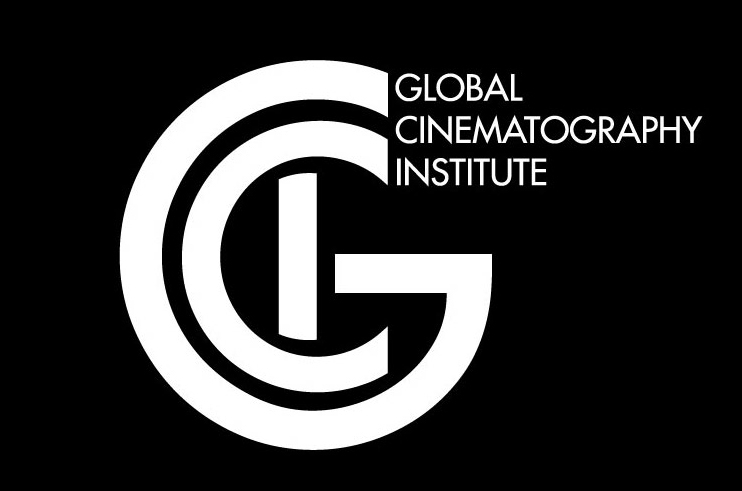
- Type: Post-Graduate, Workshop
- Established: January 2012
- Founders: Vilmos Zsigmond, Yuri Neyman
- Location: Los Angeles, California, United States

Global Cinematography Institute (GCI) is a film school that teaches new emerging technologies and concepts in the field of cinematography. Founded by Yuri Neyman, ASC and Vilmos Zsigmond, ASC, the Global Cinematography Institute aims to prepare filmmakers to take advantage of on-going advances in digital and virtual cinematography technologies through a curriculum known as Expanded Cinematography.

In 2021, GCI announced that they were deferring all sessions and stopped taking student applications, due to the COVID-19 pandemic.

== History ==
=== Founders ===
The Global Cinematography Institute was founded by cinematographers Yuri Neyman, ASC and Vilmos Zsigmond, ASC. Zsigmond emigrated to the U.S. in 1957 after graduating from the Film Academy in Budapest, Hungary. Zsigmond won an Academy Award for Best Cinematography for his work on "Close Encounters of the Third Kind" with Steven Spielberg in 1977. Neyman came to the United States in the 1980s from Moscow, Russia and went on to make "Liquid Sky" and "D.O.A." and more. Neyman and Zsigmond agree on the problems found in the field of current cinematography, and that a great deal of cinematographic knowledge is not being passed down, and as a result, cinematographers are losing power on-set and in post production to new emerging technologies.

=== Mission ===
The Global Cinematography Institute is an educational research and development entity focused on analyzing, preserving and predicting the roles of imagery. The aim of the school's curriculum is to give cinematographers mastery of both art and technology, so that they can assert that control over the images they capture on set, or in the computer. Art is a core concept at the Global Cinematography Institute. "It is that mastery of the art side that separates the amateur from the professional", Zsigmond has said. Everyone associated with the school believes that cinematography is an art, and technology is simply a set of tools that help to accomplish that art.

== Curriculum ==
The school is organized in sessions, each teaching about 10 students at a time. Curriculum emphasizes "Expanded Cinematography" which teaches students the basic technological skills necessary to direct imagery inside the 3D worlds of special effects, animation and video games. The school's emphasis is not primarily on technology. GCI offers students classes in "Traditional Cinematography" and "Lighting and Composition". Classes offered at the Global Cinematography Institute include "Virtual Lighting", "Previsualization", "Cinematography for Small Budget/Indie Films”, “Virtual Cinematography", "On-Set Image Management", "Advanced Lighting for Feature Films", "Foundations of Lighting and Composition", "Digital Cinematography", "Career Management", and "Technology of Lighting".

=== Expanded Cinematography ===
GCI uses the term Expanded Cinematography to refer to a curriculum of cinematography classes covering traditional and new concepts and techniques, including study in fields new to the cinematographer's profession, including video games, virtual lighting, previsualization, visual effects and more. "We are devoted to preparing filmmakers through Expanded Cinematography to take advantage of on-going advances in digital and virtual cinematography technologies," says Neyman. Elsewhere, he says "There must be further development of the cinematographer’s profession, making him or her a Cinematographer-Artist-Designer-Technologist who is able to comprehend and solve any tasks which modern production can put in front of them."

== Teachers ==
=== Faculty ===
Classes taught in parentheses:

- Vilmos Zsigmond, ASC (Lighting for Feature Films)
- Yuri Neyman, ASC (Foundations of Lighting and Composition)
- David Stump, ASC (Digital Cinematography)
- Jon Tower (Technology of Lighting)
- Sylvain Doreau (Cinematography in Video Games)
- Fred Durand (Digital Lighting)
- Ron Fischer (Virtual Cinematography)
- Jay Holben (Digital Cinematography, Cinematography for Independent Films)
- Bob Kertesz (Image Management)
- Jason Knutzen (Modern Tools and Concepts of Digital Imaging)
- Kyle Murphey (Virtual Cinematography)
- Aaron Peak (Image Management)
- Brian Pohl (Previsualization)
- Christopher Probst (Digital Cinematography, Cinematography for Independent Films)

=== Visiting artists / guest instructors ===
- Haskell Wexler
- Russell Carpenter
- James Chressanthis
- Stuart Dryburgh
- Matthew Libatique
- Seamus McGarvey
- M. David Mullen
- Sam Nicholson
- Dante Spinotti
- Theo van de Sande
- Geoff Boyle
- Zhenya Gershman
