= Liz Renay =

American actress and dancer (1926–2007)

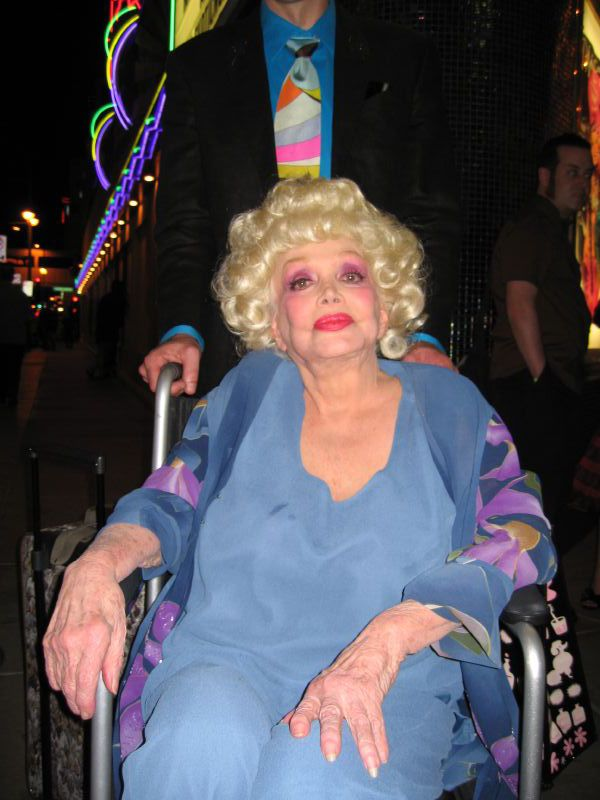
- Renay at the 2006 Miss Exotic World Pageant
- Born: Pearl Elizabeth Dobbins; April 14, 1926; Chandler, Arizona, U.S.
- Died: January 22, 2007 (aged 80); Las Vegas, Nevada, U.S.
- Spouse(s): Ricky Romano (c. 1941–div. 1943); Paul W. McLain (1944–div.?); George O'Leyar (1950–div.?); William Forrest (1956–59, his death); Read Morgan (1963–div.?); Thomas W. Freeman (1966–div.1973); Gerald E. Heidebrink (1976–div.1983)
- Children: 2

Pearl Elizabeth Dobbins (April 14, 1926 – January 22, 2007), known professionally as Liz Renay, was an American stripper, author, and actress who appeared in John Waters' film Desperate Living (1977).

== Early life ==
She was born Pearl Elizabeth Dobbins on April 14, 1926, in Chandler, Arizona, to William Andrew Dobbins (1898–1986) and his wife Ada May (née Phillips; 1904–1982), who were described as being "evangelical parents".

The United States Federal Census from 1940 listed the Dobbins family living in Mesa, Arizona. Renay was recorded as Pearl, age 13. Her father, William, was a 41-year-old lettuce trimmer for a produce shipper. Renay had four siblings: Emily, who was four years older; William E., who was six years younger; Jack, nine years younger; and Dorothy May, 10 years younger.

In 1949, Renay was named Miss Stardust of Arizona and in the contest won "$500 cash, a trip to New York, and a modeling contract in the 1949 contest."

Her childhood was filled of dreams of becoming a star. The production crew for The Sound of Fury came to Phoenix to film and wanted townspeople. A 24-year-old Renay, then known as Pearl McLain, was a twice-divorced, unemployed waitress raising two young children. She was one of 500 extras, and during her two days of filming, "she kept maneuvering herself into positions where someone important would notice and offer her a movie career."

== Career ==
She was known more as a performer with ties to celebrities, usually actors, rather than as an actor herself.

Nevertheless, she did play the lead role in John Waters' film Desperate Living and appeared on an episode of Adam-12 as a burlesque dancer who calls the police about a peeping tom outside her home (season five, November 1972, episode "Harry Nobody").

She and her daughter, Brenda (1943–1982), toured with an on-stage striptease act. The act ended when her daughter Brenda committed suicide on her 39th birthday in 1982.

Renay was mobster Mickey Cohen's girlfriend. Renay was convicted of perjury in 1959 and served 27 months of a three year sentence at Terminal Island.

In a tell-all book about her many relationships with men both famous and not so famous, titled My First 2,000 Men, she claimed flings with Joe DiMaggio, Regis Philbin, Glenn Ford, and Cary Grant. Renay's other books include My Face for the World to See and Staying Young (Lyle Stuart, 1982). My Face for the World to See was reissued in 2002, headlined "A Cult Classic", with a foreword by John Waters. Waters integrated the title into the dialogue of his film Female Trouble (1974) before working on his film Desperate Living with Renay.

Renay died at age 80 on January 22, 2007, in her adopted hometown of Las Vegas, Nevada, from cardiac arrest and gastric bleeding.

== Personal life ==
Liz was married a total of seven times, to:

- Ricky Romano: She married him when she was approximately 15 years old. From this marriage, a daughter, Brenda Whylene, an actress who went by the stage name Brenda Renay, was born. (At 16, Brenda married Leo Landry.) Ricky and Renay were divorced in 1943.
- Paul McLain: From this marriage, one son, Johnny Allen McLain Sr. (1945–2012) was born. They later divorced.
- George L. "Lou" O'Leyar : She married him on September 21, 1950, in Los Angeles County, California.
- William Forrest: An actor, she married him in 1956, but the marriage proved to be bigamous, as Forrest had not divorced his former wife until 1959. Forrest died August 10, 1960, "while making a movie in Tokyo."
- Read Morgan (1931 - 2022): An actor, she married him on November 25, 1963, in Nevada. They appeared together in the film Deadwood '76 (1965).
- Thomas W. Freeman (born circa 1925): She married him on May 23, 1966. In a 1972 Los Angeles Times article, Freeman was described as "a millionaire entrepreneur who provides her with almost everything she wants — including a separate $175-a-month apartment for her two dogs. He also gives her her freedom." It adds: "Freeman is on the road almost constantly. He and Liz see each other only on weekends — if then — and Miss Renay says it is an ideal relationship, 'more like a romance than a marriage.' They have been married six years now — longer than her first five marriages combined — and Miss Renay readily admits this marriage, too, would have been over long ago were it not for their unusual arrangement." They were divorced in April 1973.
- Gerald E. Heidebrink (1933–1987): She married him on November 3, 1976, in Nevada. The marriage ended in divorce on April 12, 1983, also in Nevada.

== Filmography ==
- A Date With Death (1959)
- The Nasty Rabbit (1964)
- Day of the Nightmare (1965)
- The Thrill Killers (1965)
- The Hard Road (1970)
- ’’Adam-12’’ (11/08/1972) Dawn Patrol
- Blackenstein (1973)
- Virgin Cowboy (1975)
- Desperate Living (1977)
- Lady Street Fighter (1981)
- Dimension in Fear (1998)
- The Corpse Grinders II (2000)
- Mark of the Astro-Zombies (2004)
