= Deadwood '76 =

1965 film by James Landis

- Directed by: James Landis
- Screenplay by: Arch Hall Jr. (as Arch Hall); James Landis
- Story by: Arch Hall Jr. (as Arch Hall) (original story)
- Produced by: Arch Hall Sr. (as Nicholas Meriwether)
- Starring: Arch Hall Jr. Jack Lester
- Cinematography: Lew Guinn (as Lewis Guinn; Vilmos Zsigmond (as William Zsigmond)
- Edited by: Anthony M. Lanza
- Production company: Fairway International Pictures
- Distributed by: Fairway International Pictures
- Release date: June 30, 1965
- Running time: 97 minutes
- Country: United States
- Language: English

Deadwood '76 is a 1965 American Techniscope Western film directed by James Landis and starring Arch Hall Jr. and Jack Lester.

== Plot ==
A drifter, Billy May (Arch Hall Jr.) arrives in Deadwood, South Dakota. A child misidentifies him as Billy the Kid and the town turns against him. He becomes a fugitive chased by Wild Bill Hickok. He runs into his long lost father who was a Civil War Veteran for the Confederacy. His father has made friends with a tribe of Indians and admires the leadership of the elders in the tribe. He plans on joining forces and tries to get Billy to join but Billy is not interested. He is interested in finding gold and living in peace however that is not what is in store for poor Billy.

== Cast ==
- Arch Hall Jr. as Billy May
- Jack Lester as Tennessee Thompson
- La Donna Cottier as Little Bird
- Arch Hall Sr. as Boone May (as William Watters)
- Liz Renay as Poker Kate (as Melissa Morgan)
- Robert Dix as Wild Bill Hickok
- Richard Cowl as Preacher Smith (as Richard S. Cowl)
- Jonny Bryant as Hubert Steadman
- David Reed as Fancy Poggin
- Gordon Schwenk as Spotted Snake
- Ray Zachary as Spec Greer
- Barbara Moore as Montana
- Hal Bizzy as Curt Aiken
- Read Morgan as Ben Hayes (as Reed Morgan)
- Rex Marlow as Sam Bass
- Joan Howard as Mrs. Steadman
- John 'Bud' Cardos as Hawk Russell (as John Cardos)
- Ray Vegas as Indian
- Jack Little as Bear Creek
- Bobby Means as Doctor
- Willard W. Willingham as Deputy Harding (as William Willingham)

== Soundtrack ==
Deadwood Music by Harper MacKay Lyrics by Arch Hall Sr. Sung by Rex Holman https://www.imdb.com/title/tt0059093/soundtrack

== See also ==
- List of American films of 1965
