= László Kovács (cinematographer) =

Hungarian-American cinematographer

- Kovács in 2006
- Born: 14 May 1933; Cece, Hungary
- Died: 22 July 2007 (aged 74); Beverly Hills, California, U.S.
- Other names: Lester Kovacs; Leslie Kovacs; Leslie Kovacks; Leslie Kouvacs; Art Radford
- Years active: 1957–2007
- Spouse: Audrey Kovács (m. 1984)
- Children: 2

László Kovács ASC (Hungarian pronunciation: [ˈkovaːt͡ʃ ˈlaːsloː]; 14 May 1933 – 22 July 2007) was a Hungarian-American cinematographer, known for his influential work in the development of the American New Wave of films in the 1970s, he collaborated with many known directors, especially Peter Bogdanovich and Richard Rush.

Kovács was the recipient of numerous awards, including three Lifetime Achievement Awards. He was also an active member of the American Society of Cinematographers and a member of the organization's board of directors.

== Early life ==
Born in Cece, Hungary, to Julianna and Imre Kovács, Kovács studied cinema at the Academy of Drama and Film in Budapest between 1952 and 1956. Together with Vilmos Zsigmond, a fellow student and lifelong friend, Kovács secretly filmed the day-to-day development of the Hungarian Revolution of 1956 on black and white 35 mm movie film, using an Arriflex camera borrowed from their school. In November that year, they smuggled the 30,000 feet (9,100 m) of film into Austria to have it developed, and they arrived in the United States in March 1957 to sell the footage. By that time, however, the revolution was no longer considered newsworthy and it was not until some years later, in 1961, that it was screened on the CBS television network, in a documentary narrated by Walter Cronkite.

Kovács decided to settle in the United States, becoming a naturalized citizen in 1963. He worked at several manual labor jobs, including making maple syrup and printing microfilm documents in an insurance office, before making several "no-budget" and "low-budget" films with Vilmos Zsigmond, including The Incredibly Strange Creatures Who Stopped Living and Became Mixed-Up Zombies. At the time Kovács would be credited as Leslie Kovacs and Zsigmond as William Zsigmond.

== Film career ==
Kovács' breakthrough came with the 1969 film Easy Rider, starring and directed by Dennis Hopper. Kovács was reluctant to work on this film at first, having already worked on a number of B movie biker films, such as Hells Angels on Wheels. Hopper ultimately convinced Kovács that this film would be different and Kovács signed on as the film's director of photography. He earned second place for the Best Cinematographer Golden Laurel at the 1970 Laurel Awards. In 1970, he again worked with Hopper on the film The Last Movie. That same year, Kovács filmed Five Easy Pieces, for which he received the third place Golden Laurel for Best Cinematographer.

Kovács filmed more than 70 motion pictures. Among these were six films for director Peter Bogdanovich: Targets, What's Up, Doc?, Paper Moon, At Long Last Love, Nickelodeon, and Mask. Bogdanovich worked with Kovács more times than any other cinematographer.

Other notable films Kovács photographed include For Pete's Sake, Shampoo, New York, New York, Ghostbusters, Ruby Cairo, Say Anything..., Radio Flyer, My Best Friend's Wedding, and Miss Congeniality. He also did additional photography on Close Encounters of the Third Kind, The Last Waltz and The Rose.

When working on The Last Waltz, camera operators were instructed to turn their cameras off at different intervals, in order to save battery life. One of these instances was during Muddy Waters' set, but Waters' outstanding performance led director Martin Scorsese to spontaneously change his mind, and ordered all cameras to be turned on. Because the cameras took several minutes to fully warm up, most caught only the last few bars of Waters' performance. Kovács, however, either did not hear or disregarded orders to shut down his camera, and was the only cameraman on set who managed to film Waters' entire performance.

Kovács' final work appears in Torn from the Flag, a 2006 feature documentary about the 1956 Hungarian Revolution which incorporates original footage he and Zsigmond shot as film students before fleeing to the United States.

== Personal life ==
On July 22, 2007, Kovács died at his home in Beverly Hills, California at the age of 74. At the time of his death, Kovács had been married for 23 years to his wife, Audrey. He had two daughters, Julianna and Nadia, and a granddaughter, Mia.

== Awards and honors ==
In 1995 he was a member of the jury at the 19th Moscow International Film Festival.

Kovács was honored with Lifetime Achievement Awards from Camerimage (1998), WorldFest (1999), and the American Society of Cinematographers (2002). The Lifetime Achievement Award from the ASC is the organization's highest honor. In addition, Kovács received an Excellence in Cinematography Award from the 1999 Hawaii International Film Festival and a Hollywood Film Award at the 2001 Hollywood Film Festival.

The American Society of Cinematographers dedicated the 2008 Heritage Award for top student filmmakers in memory of Kovács.

The 2008 documentary film No Subtitles Necessary: Laszlo & Vilmos explores the 50-year friendship between Kovács and Zsigmond and their influence on filmmaking. Film critic Leonard Maltin said that, without Kovács and fellow cinematographer Zsigmond, "the American New Wave of the late 1960s and early '70s wouldn’t have flowered as it did."

== Filmography ==
Film

Year	Title	Director	Notes
1964	Kiss Me Quick!^{[I]}	Peter Perry	
1965	The Wonderful World of Girls^{[II]}	Peter Perry	
1966	The Notorious Daughter of Fanny Hill^{[II]}	Peter Perry	
1966	A Smell of Honey, a Swallow of Brine^{[II]}	Byron Mabe	
1966	Single Room Furnished^{[III]}	Matt Cimber	
1967	Hells Angels on Wheels	Richard Rush	
1968	A Man Called Dagger	Richard Rush	
1968	Psych-Out	Richard Rush	
1968	The Savage Seven	Richard Rush	
1968	Mantis in Lace^{[IV]}	William Rotsler	
1968	Targets	Peter Bogdanovich	
1969	Mark of the Gun^{[III]}	Wally Campo; Walter Campos	
1969	Easy Rider	Dennis Hopper	
1969	Blood of Dracula's Castle^{[III]}	Al Adamson	
1969	That Cold Day in the Park	Robert Altman	
1970	The Rebel Rousers^{[V]}	Martin B. Cohen	With Glen R. Smith
1970	Getting Straight	Richard Rush	
1970	Hell's Bloody Devils^{[III]}	Al Adamson	With Frank Ruttencutter
1970	Five Easy Pieces	Bob Rafelson	
1970	Alex in Wonderland	Paul Mazursky	
1971	The Marriage of a Young Stockbroker	Lawrence Turman	
1971	The Last Movie	Dennis Hopper	
1972	Pocket Money	Stuart Rosenberg	
1972	What's Up, Doc?	Peter Bogdanovich	
1972	The King of Marvin Gardens	Bob Rafelson	
1972	A Reflection of Fear	William A. Fraker	
1973	Steelyard Blues	Alan Myerson	With Stevan Larner
1973	Slither	Howard Zieff	
1973	Paper Moon	Peter Bogdanovich	
1974	Huckleberry Finn	J. Lee Thompson	
1974	For Pete's Sake	Peter Yates	
1974	Freebie and the Bean	Richard Rush	
1975	Shampoo	Hal Ashby	
1975	At Long Last Love	Peter Bogdanovich	
1976	Baby Blue Marine	John D. Hancock	
1976	Harry and Walter Go to New York	Mark Rydell	
1976	Nickelodeon	Peter Bogdanovich	
1977	New York, New York	Martin Scorsese	
1978	F.I.S.T.	Norman Jewison	
1978	Paradise Alley	Sylvester Stallone	
1979	Butch and Sundance: The Early Days	Richard Lester	
1979	The Runner Stumbles	Stanley Kramer	
1980	Heart Beat	John Byrum	
1980	Inside Moves	Richard Donner	
1981	The Legend of the Lone Ranger	William A. Fraker	
1982	Frances	Graeme Clifford	
1982	The Toy	Richard Donner	
1984	Crackers	Louis Malle	
1984	Ghostbusters	Ivan Reitman	
1985	Mask	Peter Bogdanovich	
1986	Legal Eagles	Ivan Reitman	
1988	Little Nikita	Richard Benjamin	
1989	Say Anything...	Cameron Crowe	
1991	Shattered	Wolfgang Petersen	
1992	Radio Flyer	Richard Donner	
1992	Ruby Cairo	Graeme Clifford	
1994	The Next Karate Kid	Christopher Cain	
1994	The Scout	Michael Ritchie	
1995	Free Willy 2: The Adventure Home	Dwight H. Little	
1995	Copycat	Jon Amiel	
1996	Multiplicity	Harold Ramis	
1997	My Best Friend's Wedding	P. J. Hogan	
1998	Jack Frost	Troy Miller	
2000	Return to Me	Bonnie Hunt	
2000	Miss Congeniality	Donald Petrie	
2002	Two Weeks Notice	Marc Lawrence	

I Credited as "Lester Kovacs"
II Credited as "Art Radford"
III Credited as "Leslie Kovacs"
IV Credited as "Leslie Kovacks"
V Credited as "Leslie Kouvacs"

Short film

Year	Title	Director
1969	A Day with the Boys	Clu Gulager
1978	Mummenschanz	James Talbot

Television

Year	Title	Director	Notes
1976	Family	Mark Rydell	Episode "Pilot: The Best Years"

=== Documentary works ===
Film

Year	Title	Director	Notes
1957	Ungarn in Flammen	Stefan Erdélyi	With Vilmos Zsigmond and Franz Vass (credited as "Ferencz Vass")
1967	Mondo Mod^{[V]}	Peter Perry	With Vilmos Zsigmond (credited as "William Zsigmond")
1971	Directed by John Ford	Peter Bogdanovich	With Brick Marquard, David Sammons, Gregory Sandor, Eric Sherman and Patrick Alexander Stewart
2000	Ljuset håller mig sällskap	Carl-Gustav Nykvist	
2007	Torn from the Flag	Endre Hules; Klaudia Kovacs	With Zoltan Honti, Justin Schein and Vilmos Zsigmond

V Credited as "Leslie Kouvacs"

TV series

- National Geographic Specials (1965)
- The March of Time (1965)

TV movies

Year	Title	Director	Notes
1968	Making of the President 1968	Mel Stuart; Robert Abel; Fritz Roland	With Dick Blofson and Vilis Lapenieks
1969	Los Angeles: Where It's At^{[III]}	Jerome Jacobs; Gary Schlosser	With Robert Cirace and J. Barry Herron
1980	Making Xanadu: The Musical Fantasy Movie	Alan Metter	With Vilmos Zsigmond

III Credited as "Leslie Kovacs"
