= Arch Hall Jr. =

American actor and musician (b. 1943)

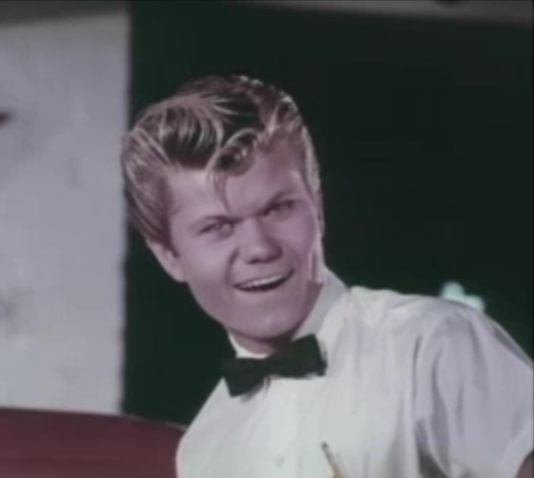
- Hall in Eegah (1962)
- Born: Archibald Williams Hall Jr. December 2, 1943 (age 82); Los Angeles, California, U.S.
- Other names: Archie Hall; Arch Hall; Nicolas Merriweather
- Occupations: Actor, musician
- Years active: 1961-1965, 2014
- Parents: Arch Hall Sr. (father); Addalyn Pollitt (mother)
- Musical career
- Genres: Rock n' roll, pop
- Instruments: Guitars, vocals
- Formerly of: Arch Hall Jr. and the Archers
- Website: archhalljr.com

Archibald Williams Hall Jr. (born December 2, 1943) is an American former actor and musician, known for his roles in several low-budget B movies made during the early 1960s.

== Early life and acting career ==
Hall was born in Van Nuys, California in 1943. His father, Arch Hall Sr., was a bit part actor and stuntman in Westerns. The younger Hall was a self-taught guitarist who played in several bands as a teenager, including a duo with future Motown producer Deke Richards. He was the frontman for the rock n' roll combo Arch Hall Jr. and the Archers. The band, formed with high school friend Alan O'Day (later a successful pop songwriter) played Sunset Strip clubs such as the Whisky a Go Go and Pandora's Box.

Convinced his son had the makings of a star, the elder Hall leased a studio space in Burbank in 1959 and started his own production company called Fairway Productions. Between 1959 and 1962, Hall starred in six films produced by his father. Most of Hall Jr.'s films featured his particular musical abilities, a teenager's tenor voice and guitar riffs played with swamp blues inflection.

For the most part, the films produced by the Halls and their associates, which at one point included cult director Ray Dennis Steckler, are considered B-movies. Hall's roles ranged from dunebuggy-driving teenager to a rock n' roll singing spy in a white dinner jacket. It is perhaps Hall's second movie, Eegah (1962), which has won him the most recognition, due in part to the television show Mystery Science Theater 3000 featuring the movie in a 1993 episode, and the late night comedy horror series Elvira's Movie Macabre. In The Sadist (1963), Hall portrayed a psychopathic killer based in part on teenage murderer Charles Starkweather. The latter film is mostly notable for the involvement of future Oscar-winning cinematographer Vilmos Zsigmond.

== Later career ==
After appearing in his last film in 1965, Hall became an airline pilot (his father had flown with the Army Air Force during the Second World War). In 1967, he went to work for cargo carrier Flying Tiger Airlines as an apprentice co-pilot on the L-1049H, and eventually became a captain flying the Boeing 747. In 1989, Flying Tiger was purchased by FedEx and Hall flew the DC-10 until he retired in 2003. He later flew for a private company with businesses in the U.S. and Japan.

Hall wrote the novel Apsara Jet, which was published in 2001 under the pen name Nicolas Merriweather (a name often used by his father). The book draws on Hall's knowledge of both commercial airlines and Southeast Asia in telling the story of a Vietnam War vet who gets involved in the illegal drug trade.

A career-spanning 51-page interview with Hall appears in the book Earth vs. the Sci-Fi Filmmakers (McFarland & Co., 2005) by Tom Weaver. Hall's anthology, Wild Guitar, was released on Norton Records. The anthology, with liner notes and biography, collects the original '60s output of Arch Hall Jr. and the Archers, much of which was unreleased at the time.

== Filmography ==
| Year | Film | Role | Notes |
|---|---|---|---|
| 1961 | The Choppers | Jack "Cruiser" Bryan | |
| 1961 | Magic Spectacles | - | Writer; Alternative title: Tickled Pink |
| 1962 | Eegah | Tom Nelson | |
| 1962 | Wild Guitar | Bud Eagle | |
| 1963 | The Sadist | Charles A. "Charlie" Tibbs | Alternative titles: Profile of Terror; Sweet Baby Charlie |
| 1964 | The Nasty Rabbit | Britt Hunter | Alternative title: Spies-a-Go-Go |
| 1965 | Deadwood '76 | Billy May | Also writer (uncredited) |

== Discography ==
- (2005) Wild Guitar — recording as Arch Hall Jr. and the Archers
- (1959) Monkey in My Hat Band / Konga Joe — recording as Arch Hall Jr.

== Books ==
- (2001) Apsara Jet — ISBN 0-9708862-0-9; writing as Nicolas Merriweather
