= Wild Guitar =

1962 film by Ray Dennis Steckler

- Directed by: Ray Dennis Steckler
- Screenplay by: Arch Hall Sr. (as Nicholas Merriwether); Bob Wehling
- Produced by: Nicholas Merriwether
- Starring: Arch Hall Jr. William Watters; Cash Flagg; Nancy Czar
- Cinematography: Joseph C. Mascelli
- Edited by: Anthony Lanza
- Color process: Black and white
- Production company: Fairway International Pictures
- Distributed by: Fairway International Pictures
- Release date: December 1962
- Running time: 93 minutes
- Country: United States
- Language: English
- Budget: $30,000 (estimated)

Wild Guitar is a 1962 American comedy-drama musical film directed by Ray Dennis Steckler and starring Arch Hall Jr., Arch Hall Sr. (credited as William Watters), Ray Dennis Steckler (credited as Cash Flagg), and Nancy Czar. The screenplay was written by Hall Sr. (as Nicholas Merriwether), Joe Thomas, and Bob Wehling. The film was produced by Hall Sr. It was one of a series of low-budget films produced in the early 1960s by Hall Sr., with his son Hall Jr. as the male star.

== Plot ==
Bud Eagle, a young singer-songwriter, arrives in Hollywood on a motorcycle. At Marge's Koffee Kup Cafe, he meets Vickie, an aspiring dancer, who quizzes him about his "gimmick" and promises to give him the "inside dope" on the music industry. He attends her performance at a television variety show later that night. When the scheduled saxophonist is unable to perform, Bud steps in with a ballad that earns him a standing ovation.

Bud's performance also earns the notice of talent scout Mike McCauley, who offers him a record deal. Bud accepts the McCauley's proposal. McCauley immediately installs Bud in a penthouse apartment, providing him with tailored suits, a Fender Jazzmaster, a mini tape recorder, and a new backing band ready to record his songs. Bud's music career takes off in spite of his mounting doubts about the unscrupulous McCauley, who pays high school students to promote his music at their schools. Bud attempts to leave McCauley more than once, but relents when McCauley reminds him of the money he's owed. Bud performs "Vickie" (also heard in Eegah (1962)) live on television, and Vickie sees the broadcast. She runs to the television studio where they joyfully reunite. They spend the night ice skating in Vickie's uncle's rink, Nancy Czar being a former figure skater.

When Bud returns to his penthouse apartment, he is confronted by Don Proctor, McCauley's previous client. He warns Bud that McCauley is cheating him, and manipulating him. McCauley's henchman, Steak, arrives with a girl, Daisy, who begins to dance seductively, distracting Bud while Steak and Proctor go outside to fight. Steak throws Proctor down a staircase. As Daisy kisses Bud, Vickie walks in, and runs out again in tears. Bud chases after her but is kidnapped by a trio of comical bums from Marge's Koffee Kup Cafe.

Eager to take advantage of McCauley, Bud helps the kidnappers to plan the crime, encouraging them to ask for more ransom money. They try to share the money with him, but he refuses. Steak breaks into the kidnappers' hideout, the group scatters, and Bud goes into hiding. He takes a job as a dishwasher at Marge's Koffee Kup Cafe, where he and Vickie reconcile, but are quickly apprehended by McCauley and Steak, who threaten violence if Bud does not return to them.

After a climactic fist fight between Steak and Bud, Steak flees, and Bud demands that McCauley reform his dishonest business. McCauley refuses. Bud reveals that he has recorded the incriminating conversation using the mini tape recorder, and he threatens to make the recording public. McCauley relents, promising to manage Bud's career fairly from now on. The film closes with scenes of Vickie and Bud dancing together on the beach as Bud sings "Twist Fever."

== Cast ==
- Arch Hall Jr. as Bud Eagle
- Arch Hall Sr. as Mike McCauley (credited as William Watters)
- Nancy Czar as Vickie Wills
- Ray Dennis Steckler as Steak (credited as Cash Flagg)
- Marie Denn as Marge
- Carolyn Brandt as dancer on ramp (Uncredited)
- Virginia Broderick as Daisy
- Robert Crumb as Don Proctor
- Rick Dennis as stage manager
- Jonathan Karle as kidnapper No. 3
- William Lloyd as Weasel
- Al Scott as Ted Eagle
- Mike Treibor as Brains (kidnapper No. 1)
- Paul Voorhees as Hal Kenton

== Production notes ==
The musical director was a high school friend of Arch Hall Jr., the young Alan O'Day, who went on to record a number 1 pop hit called "Undercover Angel" in the 1970s.

== Reception ==
Variety wrote: "Cast is mainly non-pro, only three having faced cameras before, one of whom is Watters who is only member of cast to display professional finesse. Hall's songs, which he wrote with Alan O'Day, serve as a pleasantly refreshing interludes. His acting, however, is negligible. Direction by 22 year old Ray Dennis Steckler succeeds in giving film a certain mobility but it couldn't possibly move fast enough to get away from the Nicholas Merriweather script. Editing is professional, other technical credits ok."

Boxoffice wrote: "This low-budget rock 'n' roll entry, featuring a youthful, mostly non-professional cast, will find a suitable audience on double-bill programs primarily for teenagers. Arch Hall jr, who previously appeared in the same company's The Sadist, stars as a hip-swinging, guitar-playing country boy singer determined to make the grade in Hollywood. ... Songs, written by Hall in collaboration with Alan O'Day, are refreshing interludes, as are the scene shots of famed Hollywood landmarks. The script, written by producer Nicholas Merriwether and Robert O. Wehling, with additional dialog by Joe Thomas, is adequate and is given mobility by Ray Dennis Steckler, the director."

== Legacy ==
In 2005, the film was featured in an episode of Deadly Cinema.

Nicolas Winding Refn restored and featuring the film for the Black Deer Film Festival in 2019.
