= Broadway District =

- U.S. National Register of Historic Places
- U.S. Historic district
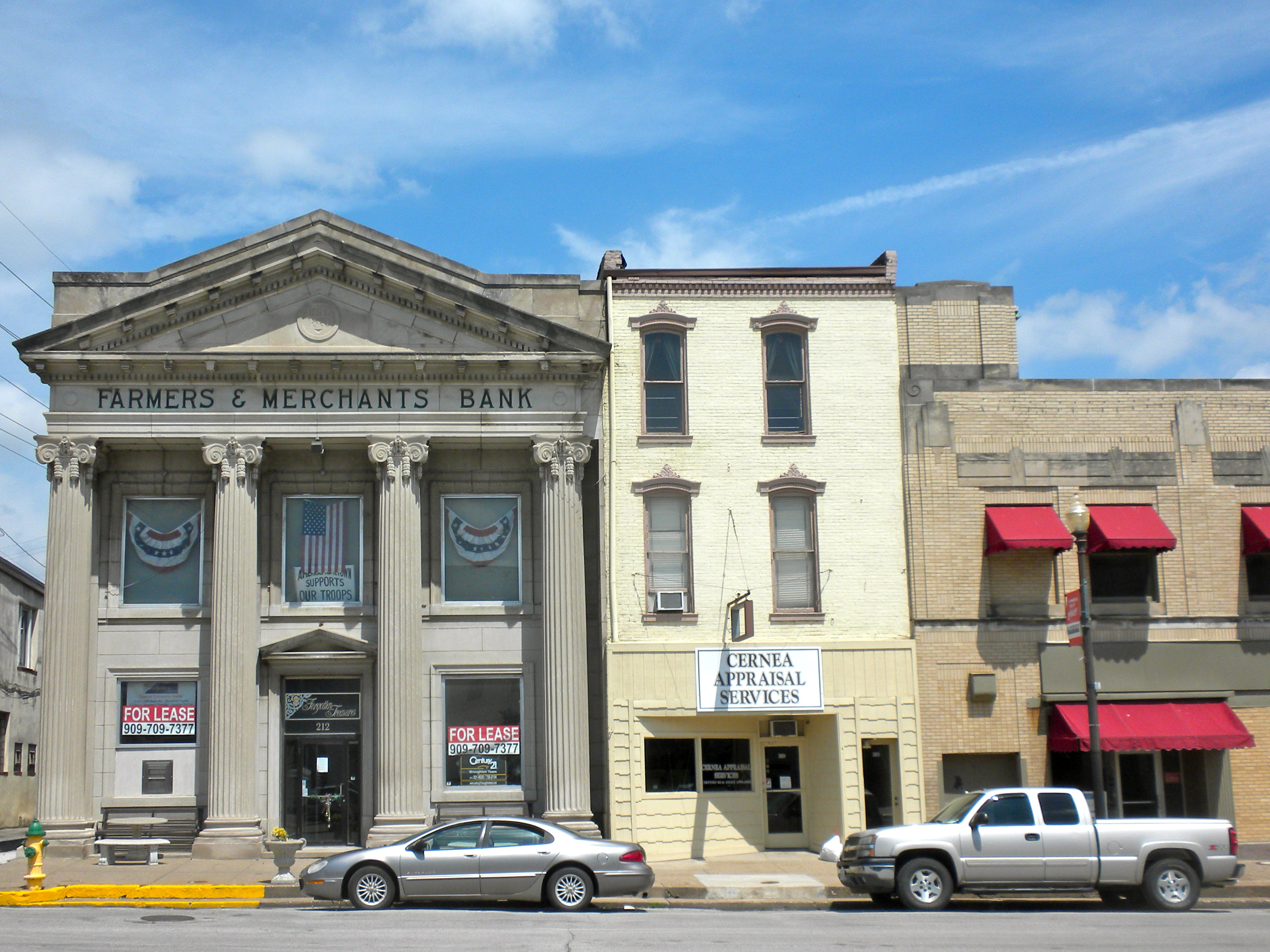
- Broadway District, July 2010

- Location within Missouri Location within the United States
- Location: Roughly bounded by S. Main, Broadway, and S. Third Sts., Hannibal, Missouri
- Coordinates: 39°42′34″N 91°21′22″W
- Area: 1.9 acres (0.77 ha)
- Built: 1866
- Architect: Martin, Malcolm S.; Beuttler, P.
- Architectural style: Classical Revival, Art Deco, Italianate
- MPS: Hannibal Central Business District MRA
- NRHP reference No.: 86002128
- Added to NRHP: August 1, 1986

Broadway District is a national historic district located at Hannibal, Marion County, Missouri. The district encompasses 28 contributing buildings in the central business district of Hannibal. It developed between about 1866 and 1934, and includes representative examples of Italianate, Classical Revival, and Art Deco architecture. Notable buildings include the Lakenan Building (c. 1866), Kresge Building (1931), Second Farmers and Merchants Bank (c. 1910), Sproul-Cash Store (1901), Hannibal Trust Company (1909-1910), Hickman Block (c. 1865), and Robinson Brothers (c. 1894).

It was listed on the National Register of Historic Places in 1986.
