= 14 Karat Soul =

American a cappella group

14 Karat Soul is an a cappella group from East Orange, New Jersey. They began their active career in the late 1970s. 14 Karat Soul were originally a strictly doo-wop group, but later branched out into other genres. They were featured in the 1980 Mabou Mines short film Sister Suzie Cinema, a 20-minute doo-wop opera by Bob Telson and Lee Breuer. 14 Karat Soul also appeared on Saturday Night Live, Sesame Street, and Between the Lions.

== Discography ==
The discography of 14 Karat Soul includes several albums and compilations on Pony Canyon for the Japanese market, where the group was known through numerous Japanese TV adverts.

- Lovers' Fantasy
- Sister Suzie Cinema & The Gospel at Colonus (with Ben Halley Jr.)
- Have Fun Tonight
- Too Young: 14 Greatest Ballads
- Take Me Back
- On The Road Again
- Ole Skool Soul
- Songs From The Heart
- The Girl in White
- Transpacific
- Get Back In Love
- That's Doo-Wop Acappella
- In Love With You
- 14 Karat Soul Sings Disney
- Mo' Disney, Mo' 14 Karat Soul
- Imagine
- Sesame Street: Sing-Along Travel Songs
