= Anne Lise Gjøstøl =

Norwegian singer, actress and visual artist

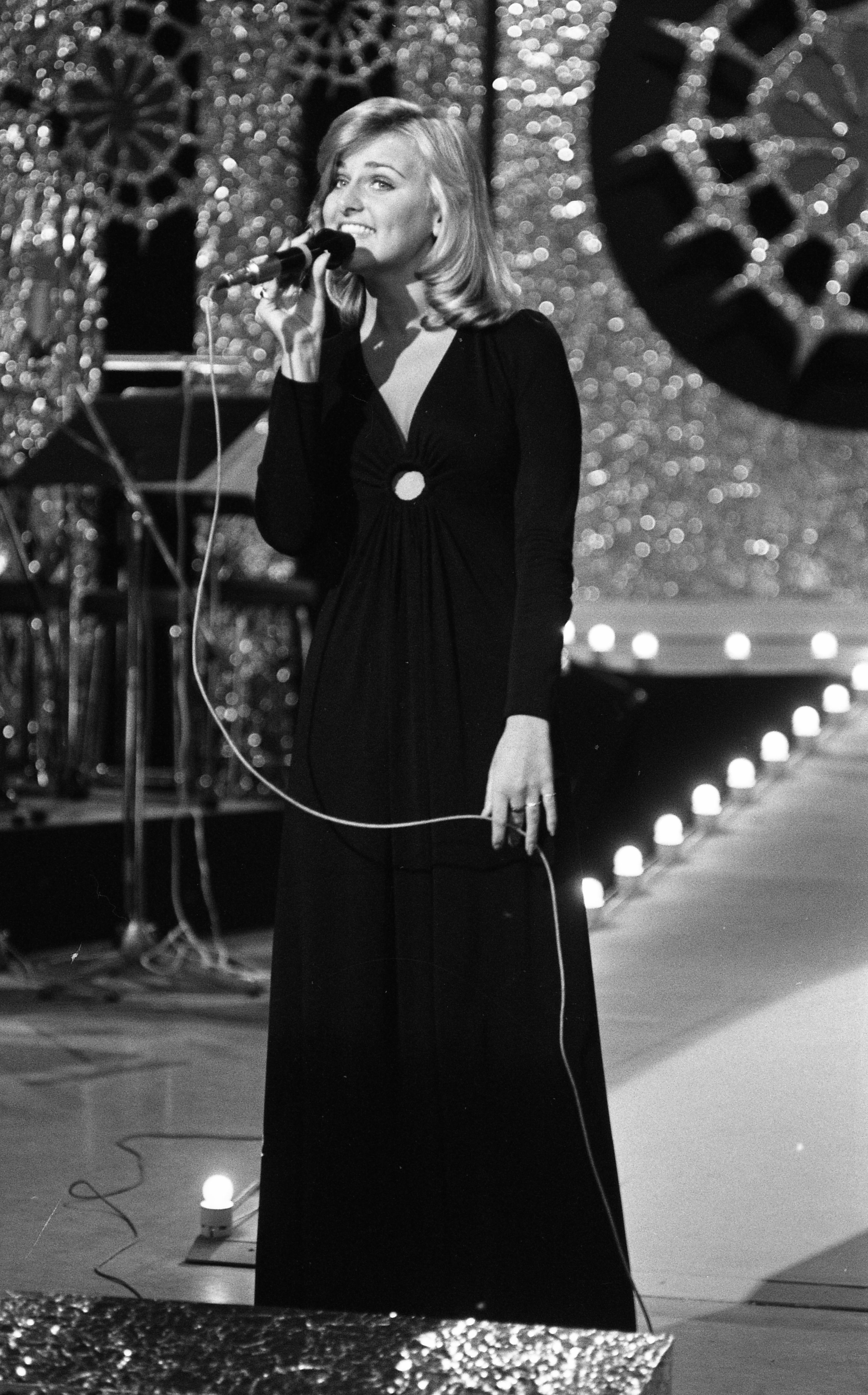
- Gjøstøl in 1974
- Born: Oslo, Norway
- Occupation: singer
- Awards: Spellemannprisen (1975)

Anne Lise Gjøstøl is a Norwegian singer, actress and visual artist. She was born in Oslo. She made her record debut in 1965 with the single "Nå er karnevalet over", and album debut in 1971 with Ta min drøm. She was awarded the Spellemannprisen in 1975. During the 1970s she participated in the song contest Melodi Grand Prix six times.
