= The Choppers =

1961 film by Leigh Jason

- Directed by: Leigh Jason
- Written by: Arch Hall Sr. (as Arch Hall)
- Produced by: Arch Hall Sr. (as Arch Hall)
- Starring: Arch Hall Jr.
- Cinematography: Clark Ramsey
- Edited by: Jack Ogilvie
- Music by: Al Pellegrini
- Production company: Rushmore Productions
- Distributed by: Fairway International Pictures
- Release date: November 30, 1961
- Running time: 66 minutes
- Country: United States
- Language: English

The Choppers is a 1961 American crime film directed by Leigh Jason and starring Arch Hall Jr.

== Plot ==
A gang of teenage greasers terrorize a small community by stealing cars and stripping them for parts, then selling the parts to a crooked junkyard owner. The police and an insurance company investigator set out to break up the gang.

== Cast ==
- Arch Hall Jr. as Jack 'Cruiser' Bryan
- Robert Paget as Torch Lester (as Robert Padget)
- Burr Middleton as Snooper (as Mickey Hoyle)
- Rex Holman as Flip Johnson (as Roye Baker)
- Chuck Barnes as Ben Shore
- Tom Brown as Tom Hart
- Marianne Gaba as Liz
- William Shaw as Police Lt. Frank Fleming (as Bill Shaw)
- Bruno VeSota as Moose McGill
- Britt Wood as Cowboy Boggs
- Dee Gee Green as Gypsy
- Richard Cowl as Torch's Father (as Richard S. Cowl)
- Patrick Hawley as Officer Jenks (as Pat Hawley)

== Soundtrack ==
- Arch Hall Jr. - "Monkey in My Hatband" (Music and lyrics by Arch Hall Jr.)
- Arch Hall Jr. - "Konga Joe" (Music and lyrics by Arch Hall Jr.)
- Arch Hall Jr. - "Up the Creek"

== See also ==
- List of American films of 1961
- List of hood films
