= Endre Hules =

Hungarian actor and director

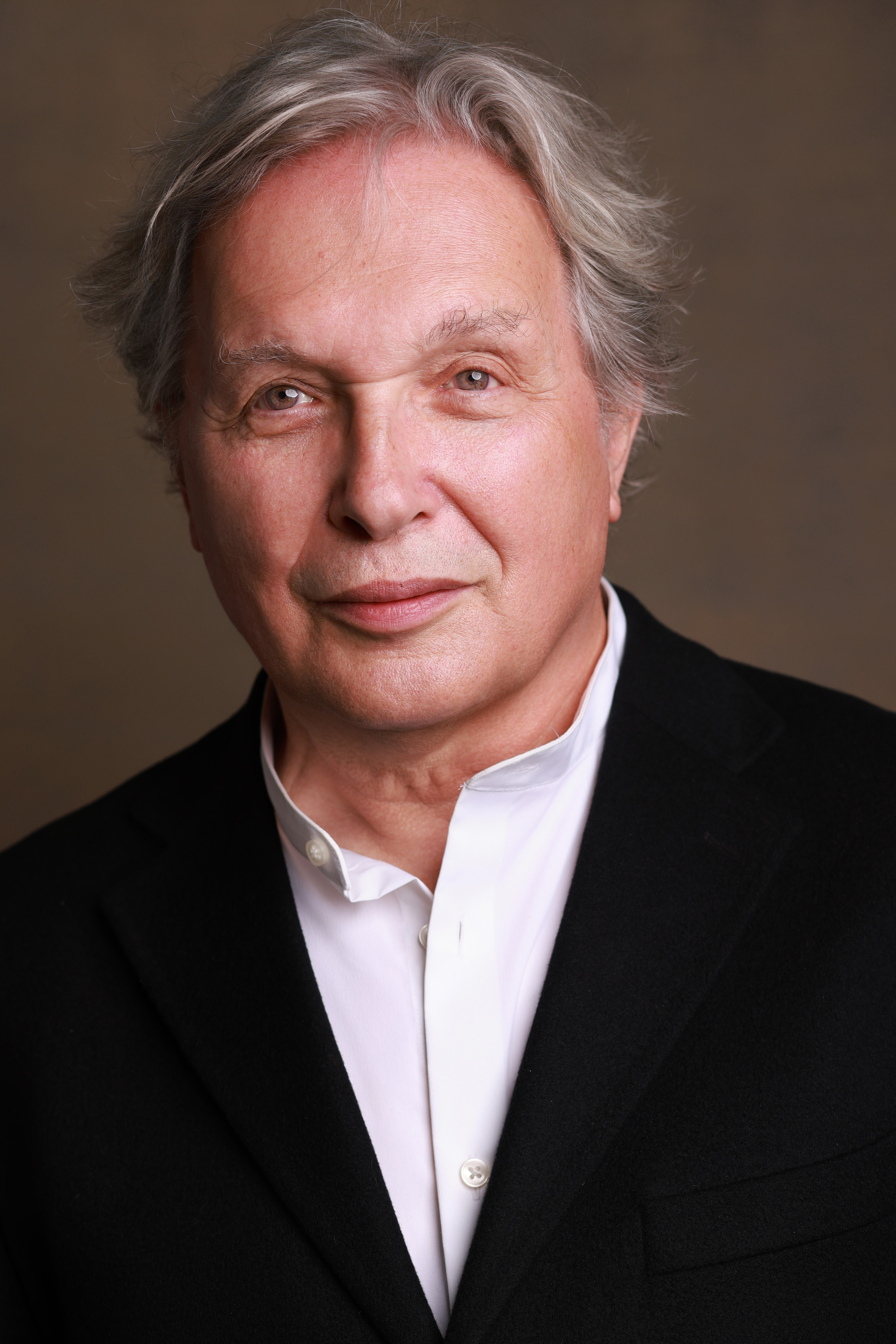
- Endre Hules, actor and filmmaker (2025)
- Born: June 26, 1954 (age 72); Budapest, Hungary
- Occupations: Director; producer; screenwriter; actor
- Known for: The Maiden Danced to Death

Endre Hules (born June 26, 1954) is a Hungarian-American actor, director, writer, and acting teacher known for Apollo 13, The Maiden Danced to Death, For All Mankind, and FBI: International. The Maiden Danced to Death was presented at the Smithsonian National Gallery of Art. and entered into its collection and Hules was invited to festival juries and panels.

== Early life ==
Hules was born and raised in Hungary, then moved subsequently to Paris, France, New York, Massachusetts and Los Angeles. He studied music and acting at the famous Cellar Theatre in Budapest, and started writing plays, composing and directing there at the age of 17. He frequently visited Jerzy Grotowski's Laboratory Theatre in Poland and attended Eugenio Barba's International School of Theatrical Anthropology in Germany. He earned an MFA from the prestigious University of Theatre and Film Arts in Budapest as a director. He was later a Producing Fellow at the American Film Institute in Los Angeles.

== Career ==
Hules started acting, writing, and directing in the theatre. Among other places, he directed at the Cellar Theatre, the National Theatres of Pécs and Szeged, La Mama ETC in New York, the Theatre Center in Los Angeles, where he was invited by the Shakespeare World Congress to direct Measure for Measure. His theater repertoire included many classical plays by Shakespeare, Moliere, Goldoni, Ibsen, Chekhov, Brecht, as well as contemporary plays from Pinter, Orton, Stoppard and Ödön von Horvath, as well as musicals like The Cabaret and experimental projects. His work was reviewed by The New York Times, the Los Angeles Times, The Hollywood Reporter, Színház and numerous other publications. He established an acting studio at the National Theatre in Szeged, then he was on the faculty of Espace Acteur, Paris, New York University, Smith College, Bard College, the University of Southern California and taught a number of workshops in Europe, North America and Japan. After moving to Los Angeles, Hules began acting in film and television productions. He worked repeatedly with directors Ron Howard and David Fincher. He sold over a dozen screenplays, two of which he also directed and co-produced: Torn From the Flag: a Film by Klaudia Kovacs and The Maiden Danced to Death. His films were invited to close to a hundred festivals and won numerous awards, among them three European Media and two Cine Golden Eagle Awards. He is also the recipient of a SAG Award for acting and an Insight Award for directing.

== Filmography ==
Year	Title	Role	Notes	Distributor
1980	Life is a Dream	director/adaptor	TV adaptation	Hungarian Television
1987	Instant Death	writer/director/producer	short	IDS Prods
1991	Danielle	writer/producer	short	American Film Inst.
1991	Long Walk into Forever	writer/producer	short	American Film Inst.
1995	Demons	writer/director/producer	short	Leap of Faith Productions
2007	Torn from the Flag: a Film by Klaudia Kovacs	writer/director/producer	Feature documentary	Homage to 1956, LLC
2009	Prima, Primavera	writer	feature	UK-Bulgarian-Dutch-Hungarian co-production
2011	The Maiden Danced to Death	writer/director/producer	feature	Canadian-Hungarian-Slovenian coproduction

== Acting ==
Year	Film	Role	Notes
1989	This Ain't Bebop	The Poet	
1989	China Beach	Younger Male Dinner Guest	Season 3, Episode 8: "China Men"
1990	Mancuso, FBI	Alex	Season 1, Episode 11: "Shall We Gdansk?"
1990	Problem Child	Additional Voices	
1991	The Bold and the Beautiful	Waiter	Season 1, Episodes 764, 801, 822, 874, 875, 981
1991	The Antagonists	Professor	Season 1, Episode 7: "Unnatural Acts"
1992	In Living Color	Foreign Minister	Season 3, Episode 17: "George Bush Meets Tommy Wu"
1992	Beverly Hills, 90210	Cabbie	Season 3, Episode 3: "Too Little, Too Late/Paris 75001"
1993	Dr. Quinn, Medicine Woman	Immigrant	Season 1, Episode 3: "Law of the Land"
1993	Wind in the Wire	Lionel	
1993	Melrose Place	Owner	Season 2, Episode 7: "Flirting with Disaster"
1993	The Waiter	Stanislowski	
1995	My Antonia	Russian Peter	
1995	VR.5	Terrorist leader	Season 1, Episode 8: "Simon's Choice"
1995	Apollo 13	Guenter Wendt	
1995	Seven	Cab Driver	
1995	MadTV	Terrorist	Season 1, Episode 4
1995	The Beast Within: A Gabriel Knight Mystery	Claus Immerding	
1996	First Strike	Russian General	
1996	The Craft	Monsieur Thepot	
1997	The Burning Zone	Sailor	Season 1, Episode 14: "The Last Endless Summer"
1997	8 Heads in a Duffel Bag	Head of Marty	
1997	The Peacemaker	Major	
1997	Diagnosis Murder	Serge Otrasky	Season 5, Episode 7: "Fatal Impact: Part 1"
1997	Kick of Death	Nicolai	
1998	Dearly Devoted	Host	
1998	Buddy Faro	Photographer	Season 1, Episode 1 Pilot
1998	Caroline in the City	Russian Man #2	Season 4, Episode 2: "Caroline and the Office"
1998	Assignment Berlin	Fred Meeks	
1998	Seven Days	Trotsky	Season 1, Episode 1 Pilot: Part 1
1998	Houdini	German Stage Manager	
1998	Acapulco H.E.A.T.	Karl	Season 1, Episode 9: "Code Name: Easy Green"
1999	Babylon 5: A Call to Arms	General Yuri	
1999	The Seventh Sense	Ivan Leszko	
2000	Walker, Texas Ranger	Aziz	Season 8, Episode 13: "Vision Quest"
2000	The Extra	Acting Teacher	
2000	Cover Me: Based on the True Life of an FBI Family	Chernokov	Season 1, Episode 3: "Domestic Terrorism"
2000	The Others	Pjotr	Season 1, Episode 13: "Mora"
2000	Arli$$	Sergey	Season 5, Episode 11: "You Can Pick Your Friends…"
2000	Devil in the Flesh 2	Host	
2001	The Wild Thornberrys	Newscaster (voice)	Season 3, Episode 14: "All Work and No Play"
2001	NYPD Blue	Alexi Slakov	Season 8, Episode 5: "Fools Russian"
2001	The Song of the Lark	Andor Harsanyi	
2001	Zoolander	German Designer	
2001	Time Lapse	Rossovitch	
2002	The Agency	KGB Officer	Season 1, Episode 14: "The Gauntlet"
2002	Alias	Mr. Vashko	Season 2, Episode 3: "Cipher"
2002	24	Serge	Day 1, Episodes 22, 24
2003	Frasier	Russian Crewman	Season 10, Episode 18: "Roe to Perdition"
2003	SOCOM II: U.S. Navy SEALs	Additional Russia VO (voice)	
2003	The Flannerys	Assassin	
2004	Monk	Captain Duprat	Season 2, Episode 10: "Mr. Monk and the Paperboy"
2004	Syphon Filter: The Omega Strain	Ivankov (voice) Security Guard Worker B (voice)	
2004	Helter Skelter	Polish Man	
2004	The West Wing	Maitre D’	Season 5, Episode 22: "Memorial Day"
2004	Shadow Ops: Red Mercury	Voice	
2004	House M.D.	Sous Chef	Season 1, Episode 7: "Fidelity"
2004	Prodigy	Teacher	
2005	Gotham Cafe	French Chef	
2005	Rainbow Six: Lockdown	Voice	
2005	SOCOM 3: U.S. Navy SEALs	Additional Morocco AO Voices (voice)	
2005	Age of Empires III	Various (voice)	
2006	SOCOM: U.S. Navy SEALs Combined Assault	Voice	
2006	SOCOM: U.S. Navy SEALs Fireteam Bravo 2	Voice	
2006	Gilmore Girls	Man	Season 7, Episode 7: "French Twist"
2006	Domestic Import	Nicolai	
2007	24	Stovich	Day 6, Episodes 12, 13
2007	The Unit	Terrorist	Season 2, Episode 20: "In Loco Parentis"
2007	World in Conflict	Voice	
2007	Tim and Eric Awesome Show, Great Job!	Billy Crystals	Season 1, Episodes 4, 6
2008	The Bourne Conspiracy	Voice	
2008	Command & Conquer: Red Alert 3	Voice	
2008	Cold Case	Leo Koslov '08	Season 6, Episode 8: "Triple Threat"
2009	Tim and Eric Awesome Show, Great Job!	Billy Crystals	Season 4, Episode 3
2009	Angels & Demons	CERN Scientist	
2009	The Saboteur	Voice	
2010	Singularity	Voice	
2010	Footsteps	Raymond	
2010	Call of Duty: Black Ops	Voice	
2010	Chateau Belvedere	Artur Masolowski	
2011	The Maiden Danced to Death	Steve Court	
2011	Battlefield 3	Amir Kaffarov (voice)	
2012	Grimm	Voice on Phone (voice)	Season 1, Episode 10: "Organ Grinder"
2012	The Big Bang Theory	Russian Mission Control (voice)	Season 5, Episode 24: "The Countdown Reflection"
2012	Ghost Recon: Future Soldier	Russian Bodark, Additional Voices	
2012	Liz & Dick	Swiss Doctor	
2014	Intelligence	Ambassador Serge Rudonov	Season 1, Episode 11: "The Grey Hat"
2014	inFamous: Second Son	Russian Bully 3 (voice)	
2015	NCIS: New Orleans	Dr. Timofey Yeltin	Season 1, Episode 19: "The Insider"
2015	The Brink	Yuri Subokov	Season 1, Episode 10: "There Will Be Consequences"
2016	Castle	Pavel Oborin	Season 8, Episode 11: "Dead Red"
2016	Agents of S.H.I.E.L.D.	Prime Minister Olshenko	Season 3, Episode 13: "Parting Shot"
2016	South Park	Sergei Shoigu (voice)	Season 20, Episode 8: "Members Only"
2017	Behind Enemy Lines	Father Timofei	
2018	Strange Angel	Professor Josef Breitner	Season 1, Episode 4: "The Sage"
2018	Skyscraper	Russian Newscaster (uncredited)	
2020	Painter	Anatole Ludovic	
2021	Shameless	Pavel	Season 11, Episode 5: "Slaughter"
2021	For All Mankind	Soviet Chief Engineer	Season 2, Episodes 6, 7
2021	FBI: International	Gregor Varga	Season 1, Episode 8: "Voice of the People"
2022	South Park	Sergei Shoigu (voice)	Season 25, Episode 4: "Back to the Cold War"
2022	Loot	Bartosz	Season 1, Episode 1 Pilot
2022	Reasonable Doubt	Sergei Ivanov	Season 1, Episode 5: "So Ambitious"
2023	The Killer	The Target	
2023	It’s Always Sunny in Philadelphia	Russian Grand Master	Season 16, Episode 4: "Frank vs. Russia"

== Theatre ==
Year	Playwright	Title	Role	Venue
1973	Hules	Our Most Audacious Dreams	director/cowriter	Cellar Theatre, Budapest
1973	Hules	Budapest	director/cowriter	Cellar Theatre, Budapest
1973	Hules	Great Madness	co-writer	Theatre 25, Budapest
1976	Ostrovski	The Scoundrel	director	Odry Theatre, Budapest
1976	Chekhov	Jubilee	director	Odry Theatre, Budapest
1976	Molière	L'Etourdi	director/transl	Odry Theatre, Budapest
1977	Bennet	A Chorus Line	director	Odry Theatre, Budapest
1977	Kander	Chicago	director	Odry Theatre, Budapest
1977	Goldoni	The Liar	director/adapt	National Tour, Hungary
1977	György Schwajda	Miracle!	director	Odry TV Studio
1978	Drzic	Dundo Maroje	director/adapt	National Theatre, Pecs
1979	Calderon	Life is a Dream	director/adapt	National Theatre, Szeged
1979	Miller	The Crucible	director/translator	National Theatre, Szeged
1979	Hules	The Whole Town is Theatre	director	Street Spectacle
1980	Kander	Cabaret	director	National Theatre, Szeged
1981	Triana	The Night of the Assassins	director	La Mama ETC, NYC
1981	Prevert	Example of the Birds	director/adapt	Troupe Theatre, NYC
1982	Mrozek	The Emigrants	director	Galaxy Stage, LA
1982	Hules	Sleeptalk	director/writer	NYU/ETW
1983	Molière	The Imaginary Invalid	director	Theatre 13
1984	Kafka/Hules	The Trial	director/adapt	Bard Theatre, NY
1985	Ostrovski	The Scoundrel	director	Bard Theatre, NY
1985	Shakespeare	Mischief in the Woods	director/adapt	Williamstown Festival
1985	Stoppard	Dogg's Hamlet	director	Williamstown Festival
1985	Overmeyer	In Perpetuity...	director	River Arts, NY
1985	Brecht	In the Jungle of Cities	director	Bard Theatre, NY
1986	Ibsen	Hedda Gabler	director	Bard Theatre, NY
1986	Chekhov	The Party	director/adapt	Williamstown Festival
1986	Synge	Playboy of the Western World	director	Bard Theatre, NY
1986	Whiting	No Why	director	Bard Theatre, NY
1987	Sanguinetti	Dream Analysis	director/translator	Theaters in L.A. & NY
1987	Shakespeare	A Midsummer Night's Dream	director	Bard Theatre, NY
1992	Shakespeare	Troilus and Cressida	director	PAC Theater Co.
1995	Shakespeare	Measure for Measure	director	LATC World Shakespeare Congress
1995	Horvath	Tales from the Vienna Woods	director	Sexon Hall, Los Angeles
1996	Orton	Loot	director	Little Theatre, Pasadena
2010	Dance Drama	The Maiden Danced to Death	writer	National Dance Theater
