= The Sadist (1963 film) =

1963 American exploitation film by James Landis

- Theatrical release poster
- Directed by: James Landis
- Written by: James Landis
- Produced by: L. Steven Snyder
- Starring: Arch Hall, Jr. Richard Alden; Marilyn Manning; Don Russell; Helen Hovey
- Cinematography: Vilmos Zsigmond
- Edited by: Anthony M. Lanza
- Music by: Paul Sawtell; Bert Shefter
- Distributed by: Fairway International Pictures
- Release date: April 25, 1963 (U.S.)
- Running time: 95 minutes
- Country: United States
- Language: English
- Budget: $69,000

The Sadist (also known as Profile of Terror and Sweet Baby Charlie) is a 1963 American thriller film written and directed by James Landis. It stars Arch Hall, Jr. as a psychopathic spree killer, patterned after Charles Starkweather, who takes a trio of hostages at a junkyard. The low-budget, independent film is notable for being the debut of future Academy Award-winning cinematographer Vilmos Zsigmond. It was distributed by Fairway International Pictures in the United States.

== Plot ==
The Sadist

Three high school teachers, Ed, Doris, and Carl, are driving through California's Antelope Valley on their way to a Dodgers game in Los Angeles. The group’s Chevrolet Bel Air has some trouble and they are forced to pull off to a gas station/junkyard on the side of the road. After examining the vehicle Ed concludes that the fuel pump will need to be replaced. Doris and Carl search the junkyard looking for the owner, but they cannot find him.

In the residence Carl finds a warm meal with a table set for four, but oddly enough nobody is in the house. The three realize this is very peculiar and start to seriously worry about their situation. At this point Charlie Tibbs, a young man wielding a Colt .45, and his semi-mute teenage girlfriend, Judy, show up. Charlie and Judy have spent the past several days heading west from Arizona, leaving a trail of corpses behind them. Law enforcement is on the hunt for them, but Charlie has managed to stay a step ahead by changing vehicles frequently and then killing the people who offer their help.

Charlie demands that Ed finish repairing the car and informs him that he and Judy will be stealing the Bel Air and taking off when Ed is done. Charlie threatens that if the three don't cooperate "it'll be the end of them." During the next hour, Charlie and his girlfriend verbally and physically torment Ed, Doris, and Carl; Doris calls Charlie an inhuman monster, and he rips her dress and smacks her, then forces Carl to kneel in the sand and plead for his life until Charlie finishes a soda, after which he shoots Carl in the head.

Ed begins to try to work out how many shots Charlie has left in the gun, and asks Charlie a lot of questions about the people he's killed on the way to their current location. Charlie reveals he has two reloads left, and reloads the gun while taunting Ed gleefully. Doris hears the hum of a motor and thinks the police are coming, and Charlie becomes paranoid. He makes Ed hide in the trunk of a car while Judy holds Doris at knifepoint. Two police bikes pull in. After a tense few moments, Doris screams for help while Ed bangs on the lid of the trunk, but to no avail; Charlie has shot both cops dead.

Charlie continues to try and force Ed to fix the car; Ed formulates a plan to run Charlie over with the car. Charlie switches on the radio, and he and Judy begin to kiss as the music switches to updates from the baseball game the teachers were on their way to. Doris gets in the car to try to run it, but Ed's plan to run over Charlie backfires when Doris can't muster the courage to step on the gas pedal. Charlie continues to coerce Ed into fixing the car, then orders him to put gasoline in the carburetor. Ed sprays gasoline in Charlie's eyes, then flees, and Charlie's damaged vision causes him to shoot and kill Judy. After mourning Judy's death and screaming like an animal, he vows to murder Ed and Doris.

Doris and Ed are able to evade Charlie until Doris screams when she discovers two dead bodies of the junkyard owners next to her where she is hiding. As Charlie shoots at her while she flees, Ed approaches with a heavy tool to try to knock him out. They pursue each other until Charlie corners Ed and kills him with one of the cops' guns, as his own has run out of bullets. Charlie steals the car Ed had been working on and drives after Doris as she runs. However, the car stalls repeatedly in the sand, and the baseball game begins playing on the radio again as Charlie abandons the car and runs after Doris with a knife.

Doris spots a stone cottage in the distance and runs inside to hide. However, she soon sees Charlie approach, and runs out again. She ducks behind the walls of an unfinished house nearby, where she is discovered again by Charlie, but as she flees once more, Charlie falls into a pit of rattlesnakes, where he is killed. The film concludes with a traumatized Doris listening to a portion of the baseball game before turning and wandering up the trail into the desert.

== Production ==
Actor and role
Actor	Role
Arch Hall Jr.	Charlie A. Tibbs
Marilyn Manning	Judy Bradshaw
Richard Alden	Ed Stiles
Helen Hovey	Doris Page
Don Russell	Carl Oliver

The film is loosely based on the killing spree of Charles Starkweather and his girlfriend Caril Ann Fugate, as are the later films Badlands (1973) and Natural Born Killers (1994). Starkweather and Fugate killed 11 people in Nebraska and Wyoming between November 1957 and January 1958, when Starkweather was 19 and Fugate was 14. The two were eventually apprehended in Douglas, Wyoming, and convicted of first-degree murder. Starkweather was executed by electric chair and Fugate was sentenced to life imprisonment, before being paroled in 1976.

Shot by famed cinematographer Vilmos Zsigmond (credited as "William Zsigmond") over a period of two weeks for $33,000, it was his first full-length film as a director of photography. Zsigmond had previously shot student films and documentaries while attending the University of Theatre and Film Arts in Budapest, but had fled his native Hungary as a refugee during the 1956 revolution. He was hired at the behest of star Arch Hall Jr., after the actor was impressed by his work as a second unit cinematographer on his previous film Wild Guitar. The success of The Sadist allowed Zsigmond to quit his day job at a photo lab and move full time into motion picture photography. Producer Samuel M. Sherman, who produced many of Zsigmond’s collaborations with B-movie director Al Adamson, noted The Sadist’s use of handheld photography, which was unusual for a 35mm film at the time.

Cast member Don Russell doubled as the film's production manager.

Richard Alden recalled that the ammunition used in the film was real, in order to save money.

The snakes used in the final scene in the pit were live and venomous. Their mouths were temporarily sewn shut for filming. One day, the snake handler was late, and the film crew started without him. They put the snakes, which had been left on the set overnight, in the pit with Hall, and began shooting. The handler arrived soon after, and informed the crew that they had put the wrong crate of snakes, which did not have their mouths sewn, in the pit with their lead actor. The serpents were becoming agitated by this point, but the crew managed to pull Hall out of the pit before he was bitten.

The musical score consisted of library music by Paul Sawtell and Bert Shefter, neither of whom were credited in the final film.

== Reception ==
On Rotten Tomatoes, the film holds an approval rating of 100% based on 5 reviews, with a weighted average rating of 7.1/10.

In a 2008 retrospective article on Badlands in The Guardian, Ryan Gilbey mentioned that the story of Starkweather and Fugate had been dramatized previously in The Sadist, "though hardly anyone remembers that one now."

== Legacy ==
The film is a favorite of director Joe Dante, who owns the 35mm print that has been the source for many of the DVD releases of this film.

== Home media ==
In 2007, Apprehensive Films released The Sadist onto DVD.
