= Vilmos Zsigmond =

Hungarian-American cinematographer (1930-2016)

Vilmos Zsigmond ASC, HSC
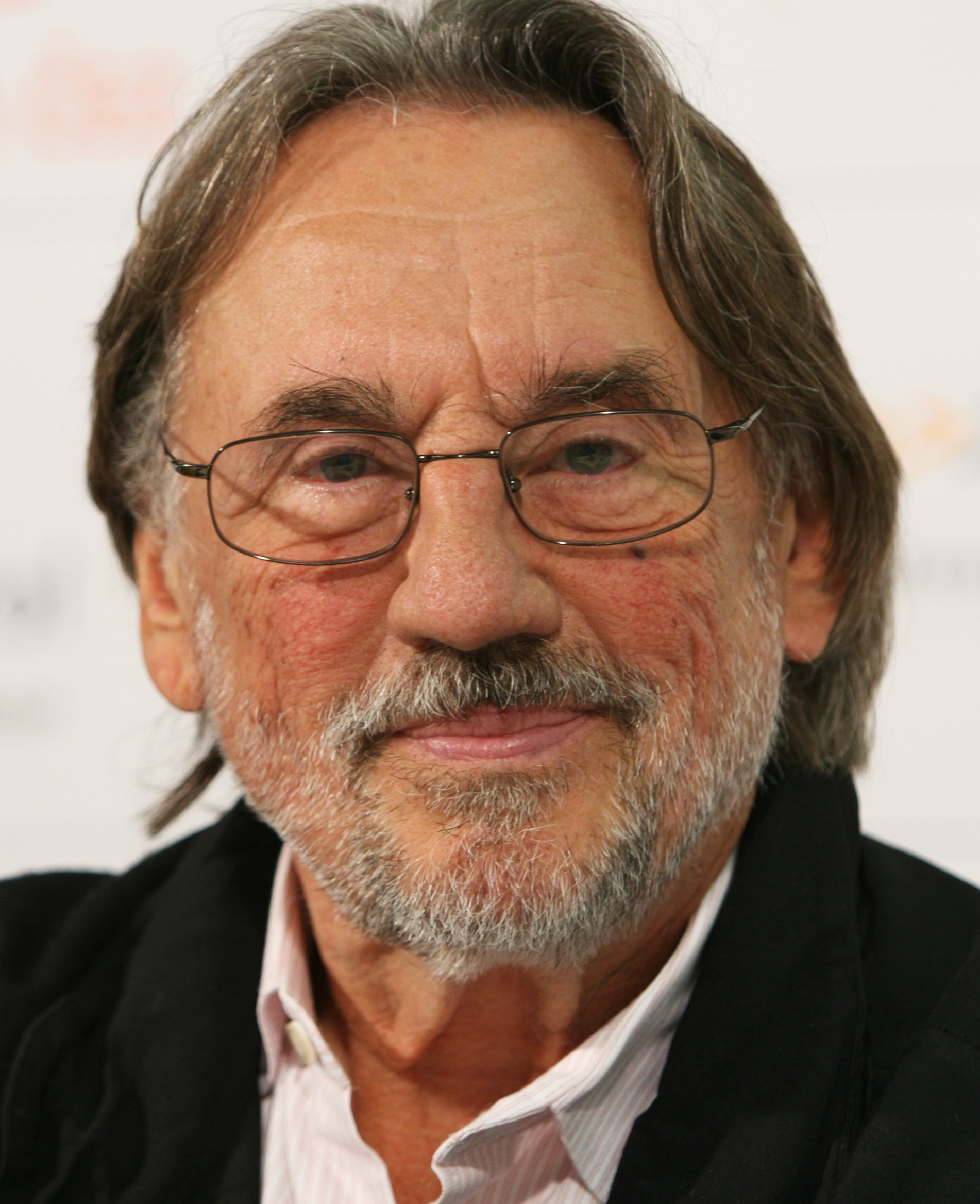
- Zsigmond at the 43rd KVIFF in 2008
- Born: June 16, 1930; Szeged, Kingdom of Hungary
- Died: January 1, 2016 (aged 85); Big Sur, California, U.S.
- Other name: William Zsigmond
- Citizenship: Hungary; United States (from 1962)
- Education: Academy of Drama and Film in Budapest (MA)
- Occupation: Cinematographer
- Years active: 1955–2015
- Spouses: Elizabeth Fuzes (divorced); Susan Roether (his death)
- Children: 2
- Parents: Vilmos Zsigmond (father); Bozena Illichman (mother)
- Awards: See below

Vilmos Zsigmond ASC HSC (Hungarian: [ˈvilmoʃ ˈʒiɡmond]; June 16, 1930 – January 1, 2016) was a Hungarian-American cinematographer. His work helped shape the look of American movies in the 1970s, making him one of the leading figures in the American New Wave movement. In 2003, he was voted as one of the ten most influential cinematographers in history by the members of the International Cinematographers Guild.

Over his career he became associated with many leading American directors, such as Robert Altman, Steven Spielberg, Brian De Palma, Michael Cimino and Woody Allen. He won the Academy Award for Best Cinematography for Close Encounters of the Third Kind and the equivalent BAFTA Award for The Deer Hunter. He also won a Primetime Emmy Award for the HBO miniseries Stalin.

His work on the films McCabe and Mrs. Miller, Close Encounters of the Third Kind and The Deer Hunter made the American Society of Cinematographers (ASC) list of the top 50 best-shot films from 1950–97. The ASC also awarded him with their Lifetime Achievement Award in 1998.

== Early life and education ==
Zsigmond was born in Szeged, Hungary, the son of Bozena (née Illichman), an administrator, and Vilmos Zsigmond, a soccer player and coach. He became interested in photography at age 17 after an uncle had given him Művészi fényképezés (The Art of Light), a book of black-and-white photographs taken by Hungarian photographer Jenő Dulovits, but under the Soviet-imposed government of the Hungarian People's Republic he was not allowed to study the subject because his family was considered bourgeois. Instead, Zsigmond worked in a factory, bought a camera and taught himself how to take pictures, going on to organize a camera club for the workers. As a result he won the respect of local commissars and was allowed to study cinema at the Academy of Drama and Film in Budapest and received an MA in cinematography. He worked for five years in a Budapest feature film studio becoming director of photography.

=== Hungarian Revolution and move to the United States ===
Zsigmond, along with his friend and fellow student László Kovács, borrowed a 35-millimeter camera from their school and chronicled the events of the 1956 Hungarian Revolution in Budapest by hiding the camera in a shopping bag and shooting footage through a hole they had cut in the bag. The two men shot thirty thousand feet of film and escaped to Austria shortly afterwards. In 1958 Zsigmond and Kovács arrived in the United States as political refugees and sold the footage to CBS for a network documentary on the revolution narrated by Walter Cronkite.

In 1962, Zsigmond became a naturalized citizen of the United States. He settled in Los Angeles and worked in photo labs as a technician and photographer.

== Career ==
=== Early work ===
The first film he worked on in the United States was the 1963 black-and-white exploitation film The Sadist, starring Arch Hall Jr. Throughout the 1960s, he worked on many low-budget independent and educational films as he attempted to break into the film industry. He made several films with director Al Adamson, including Psycho A-Go-Go (1965) and Satan's Sadists (1969).

Some of the films that he worked on during this period credited him as "William Zsigmond", including The Sadist, the classic horror B movie The Incredibly Strange Creatures Who Stopped Living and Became Mixed-Up Zombies, and the Second City satirical science fiction movie The Monitors.

=== New Hollywood ===
Kovács, who shot the 1969 film Easy Rider for Peter Fonda and Dennis Hopper, recommended Zsigmond to Fonda for his 1971 Western film The Hired Hand. Later that same year Zsigmond was hired by Robert Altman for his revisionist western film McCabe & Mrs. Miller, which became Zsigmond's breakthrough film and marked his first time working on a major Hollywood production.

Over the following decade, Zsigmond became one of the most in-demand cinematographers in Hollywood. Some of the major films he shot in the 1970s include John Boorman's Deliverance, Altman's The Long Goodbye and Brian De Palma's Obsession, as well as Steven Spielberg's The Sugarland Express and Close Encounters of the Third Kind, the latter of which won him the Academy Award for Best Cinematography at the 50th Academy Awards.

In 1978, Zsigmond worked on Michael Cimino's drama The Deer Hunter, starring Robert De Niro, Meryl Streep and Christopher Walken. Zsigmond's visual work on the film earned him the 1980 BAFTA Award for Best Cinematography and another Academy Award nomination. Zsigmond again worked with Cimino on his 1980 epic Western Heaven's Gate.

Zsigmond continued to be in demand in the years that followed, working multiple times with several directors. He again worked with De Palma on his films Blow Out, The Bonfire of the Vanities, and The Black Dahlia. He worked with Mark Rydell on Cinderella Liberty, The Rose, The River, and Intersection. He worked with George Miller on The Witches of Eastwick and with Kevin Smith on Jersey Girl. He also worked with Woody Allen on Melinda and Melinda, Cassandra's Dream, and You Will Meet a Tall Dark Stranger.

=== Later career ===
Zsigmond's television work includes the HBO miniseries Stalin, for which he won the 1993 Emmy Award for Outstanding Individual Achievement in Cinematography for a Miniseries or a Special. He was nominated for an Emmy for his work on 2001 miniseries The Mists of Avalon. Zsigmond also shot 24 episodes of The Mindy Project between 2012 and 2014.

Vilmos' life and career was featured in No Subtitles Necessary: Laszlo & Vilmos, a bio-documentary that aired on PBS's Independent Lens in 2009.

In 2011 Zsigmond co-founded the Global Cinematography Institute in Los Angeles, along with fellow cinematographer Yuri Neyman. The Institute provided an advanced cinematography educational program for postgraduate students and veteran filmmakers.

== Style and techniques ==
Zsigmond was a longtime user and endorser of Tiffen filters, and is associated with the technique known as flashing or pre-fogging, which involves carefully exposing the film negative to a small, controlled amount of light in order to create a muted color palette.

== Personal life ==
Zsigmond was married twice, and had two children with his first wife Elizabeth Fuzes.

=== Death ===
On New Year's Day 2016, Zsigmond died at his home in Big Sur, California, at the age of 85.

== Selected filmography ==
- The Sadist (1963)
- Psycho A-Go-Go (1965)
- The Picasso Summer (1969)
- The Hired Hand (1971)
- McCabe & Mrs. Miller (1971)
- Images (1972)
- Deliverance (1972)
- The Long Goodbye (1973)
- Scarecrow (1973)
- The Sugarland Express (1974)
- Obsession (1976)
- Close Encounters of the Third Kind (1977)
- The Deer Hunter (1978)
- The Rose (1979)
- Heaven's Gate (1980)
- Blow Out (1981)
- The River (1984)
- Real Genius (1985)
- The Witches of Eastwick (1987)
- Fat Man and Little Boy (1989)
- The Two Jakes (1990)
- The Bonfire of the Vanities (1990)
- Sliver (1993)
- Maverick (1994)
- Assassins (1995)
- The Ghost and the Darkness (1996)
- Life as a House (2001)
- The Mists of Avalon (2001)
- Jersey Girl (2004)
- Melinda and Melinda (2004)
- The Black Dahlia (2006)
- Cassandra's Dream (2007)
- You Will Meet a Tall Dark Stranger (2010)
- The Mindy Project (2012–14)
- Six Dance Lessons in Six Weeks (2014)

== Awards and nominations ==
Award	Wins	Nominations
Academy Awards	1	3
BAFTA Film Awards	4	1
ASC Awards	1	2
Primetime Emmy Awards	1	1

=== Major awards ===
==== Academy Awards ====
Year	Title	Category	Result
1978	Close Encounters of the Third Kind	Best Cinematography	Won
1979	The Deer Hunter	Best Cinematography	Nominated
1985	The River	Best Cinematography	Nominated
2007	The Black Dahlia	Best Cinematography	Nominated

==== BAFTA Awards ====
Year	Title	Category	Result
1973	McCabe & Mrs. Miller	Best Cinematography	Nominated
1973	Images	Best Cinematography	Nominated
1973	Deliverance	Best Cinematography	Nominated
1979	Close Encounters of the Third Kind	Best Cinematography	Nominated
1980	The Deer Hunter	Best Cinematography	Won

==== American Society of Cinematographers Awards ====
Year	Title	Category	Result
1993	Stalin	Outstanding Achievement in Cinematography in Motion Picture Made for Television	Won
1996	The Ghost and the Darkness	Outstanding Achievement in Cinematography in Theatrical Releases	Nominated
2006	The Black Dahlia	Outstanding Achievement in Cinematography in Theatrical Releases	Nominated

==== Satellite Awards ====
Year	Title	Category	Result
2006	The Black Dahlia	Best Cinematography	Nominated

==== Primetime Emmy Awards ====
Year	Title	Category	Result
1993	Stalin	Outstanding Cinematography for a Limited Series or Movie	Won
2002	The Mists of Avalon ("Part 1")	Outstanding Cinematography for a Limited Series or Movie	Nominated

=== Other accolades ===
Institution	Year	Title	Category	Result
CableACE Awards	1994	Stalin	Photography in a Movie or Miniseries	Won
Camerimage Festival	2002	Bánk bán	Best Film Adaptation of an Opera	Won
Camerimage Festival	2006	The Black Dahlia	Golden Frog	Nominated
Camerimage Festival	2010	Louis	Golden Frog	Nominated
Camerimage Festival	2014	God the Father	Golden Frog	Nominated
Hollywood Film Awards	2006	The Black Dahlia	Cinematographer of the Year	Won
National Society of Film Critics Awards	1972	McCabe & Mrs. Miller	Best Cinematography	3rd place (Note: (tied with Billy Williams for Sunday Bloody Sunday.)
National Society of Film Critics Awards	1973	Images	Best Cinematography	2nd place
National Society of Film Critics Awards	1974	The Long Goodbye	Best Cinematography	Won
National Society of Film Critics Awards	1982	Blow Out	Best Cinematography	Nominated

=== Lifetime achievement honors ===
- 1997: Camerimage Festival
- 1999: American Society of Cinematographers
- 1999: Cinequest Film & Creativity Festival
- 2010: Manaki Brothers Film Festival
- 2014: Cannes Film Festival

== See also ==
- No Subtitles Necessary: Laszlo & Vilmos (2008)
