= Tatsuro Yamashita discography =

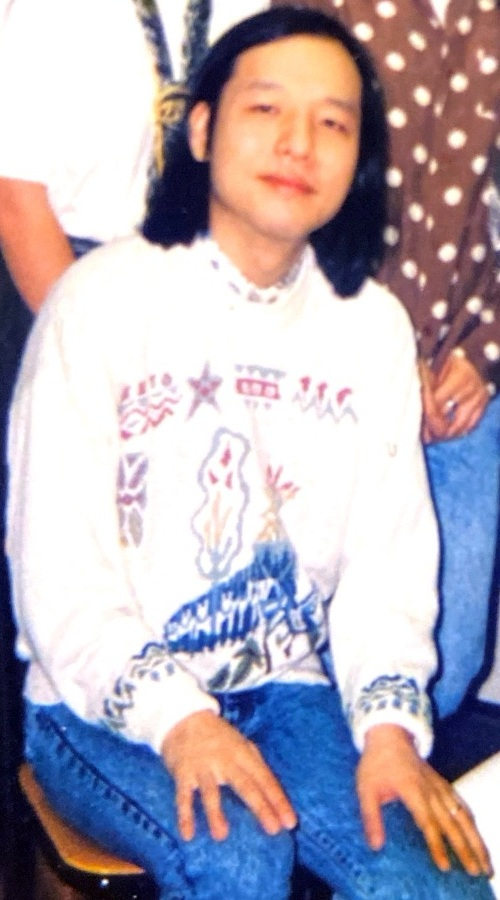
- Yamashita in 1988
- Studio albums: 19
- Soundtrack albums: 2
- Live albums: 3
- Compilation albums: 16
- Singles: 53
- Music videos: 3
- Collaboration albums: 4
- Cover albums: 4

Japanese singer-songwriter Tatsuro Yamashita has released 19 solo and 4 collaboration studio albums (including 2 soundtrack and 4 cover albums), 3 live albums, 16 compilation albums, 3 music videos, and 53 singles. Prior to 1983, most of Yamashita's work was distributed by imprints of RCA Records and JVC. Since 1983, Yamashita's work has been distributed by the Moon Records label, which was an imprint of Alfa Records before it was acquired by Warner Music Japan in 1990. Yamashita has sold over 10 million records worldwide.

== Albums ==
=== Solo studio albums ===
Year	Album	Chart positions	Label	Notes	Sales estimate
Year	Album	JPN	Label	Notes	Sales estimate
1976	Circus Town	27	RVC/RCA	In 2002, expanded remaster edition was reissued; Peaked the chart at the time of 2002 reissue	23,000+
1977	Spacy	29	RVC/RCA	In 2002, expanded remaster edition was reissued; Peaked the chart at the time of 2002 reissue	19,000+
1978	Go Ahead!	25	RVC/RCA	In 2002, expanded remaster edition was reissued; Peaked the chart at the time of 2002 reissue	24,000+
1979	Moonglow	20	RVC/AIR	In 2002, expanded remaster edition was reissued	200,000+
1980	Ride on Time	1	RVC/AIR	In 2002, expanded remaster edition was reissued	300,000+
1980	On the Street Corner	13	RVC/AIR	Cover album; Originally, it was a limited edition of 100,000 copies; In 1986, remix and re-recorded vocal edition was officially reissued as "On The Street Corner 1 ('86 Version)"; In 2000, expanded edition was reissued as "On The Street Corner 1"	100,000+
1982	For You	1	RVC/AIR	In 2002, expanded remaster edition was reissued	700,000+
1983	Melodies	1	Alfa Moon	In 2013, the reissue version was released as "30th Anniversary Edition"	800,000+
1984	Big Wave	2	Alfa Moon	Soundtrack for the film of the same name; In 2014, the reissue version was released as "30th Anniversary Edition"	450,000+
1986	Pocket Music	1	Alfa Moon	In 1991, a new remix version of the song was released; In 2020, the reissue version was released as "2020 Remaster"	500,000+
1986	On the Street Corner 2	3	Alfa Moon	Cover album; In 2000, expanded edition was reissued	200,000+
1988	Boku no Naka no Shounen (僕の中の少年)	1	Alfa Moon	In 2020, the reissue version was released as "2020 Remaster"	500,000+
1991	Artisan	1	Moon/MMG	In 2021, the reissue version was released as "30th Anniversary Edition"	700,000+
1993	Season's Greetings	4	Moon/MMG	Christmas cover album; In 2013, the reissue version was released as "20th Anniversary Edition"	400,000+
1998	Cozy	1	Moon/Warner		1,000,000+
1999	On the Street Corner 3	4	Moon/Warner	Cover album	300,000+
2005	Sonorite	2	Moon/Warner		250,000+
2011	Ray of Hope	1	Moon/Warner		250,000+
2022	Softly	1	Moon/Warner	Released on June 22, 2022	200,000+

=== Collaboration studio albums ===
Year	Album	Chart positions	Label	Notes
Year	Album	JPN	Label	Notes
1975	Songs	3	Niagara/Elec	The only studio album by the band Sugar Babe; Peaked the chart at the time of 1994 reissue; In 2005, expanded remaster edition was reissued as "30th Anniversary Edition"; In 2015, expanded remaster edition and remix was reissued in a two-disc album as "40th Anniversary Ultimate Edition"; In 2025, expanded remaster edition with bonus tracks and the live show "Tatsuro Yamashita Sings Sugar Babe" was reissued in a two-disc album as "50th Anniversary Edition"
1976	Niagara Triangle Vol.1	63	Niagara/Columbia	The only studio album by the limited pop trio Niagara Triangle (with Eiichi Ohtaki and Ginji Ito); Peaked the chart at the time of reissue
1978	Pacific	—	CBS/Sony	Instrumental album produced by Masatoshi Sakai; Collaboration with Haruomi Hosono and Shigeru Suzuki
1978	Kagirinaku Tōmei ni Chikai Burū ("Almost Infinitely Transparent Blue"); Original Soundtrack	—	Kitty	Soundtrack for the 1979 film adaptation of the novel of the same name; Performed a cover of "Groovin'"

=== Live albums ===
His first live album released, It's a Poppin' Time, includes a lot of his better-known songs from the 70s. It even includes a few songs he covered by other artists.

His first live double-album, Joy was a selection of performances throughout the 80s, it released in 1989.

Joy 1.5 included a few of his performances in the 90s. This was released as an EP, as a bonus to his 2011 album "Ray of Hope".

In 2025, a 50th Anniversary reissue of Sugar Babe's album, Songs was released, along with a live album, Tatsuro Yamashita sings Sugar Babe Live in 1994. He performed this concert with his solo touring band and Taeko Onuki. She appeared as the only other member within the original Sugar Babe lineup. The concert took place in Nakano Sun Plaza on May 2, 1994.

Joy 2 releases on October 14, 2026, covering a selection of 600 Performances between 13 National Tours within 17 years, 2008 through 2025.

Year	Album	Chart positions	Label	Notes	Sales estimate
Year	Album	JPN	Label	Notes	Sales estimate
1978	It's a Poppin' Time	28	RVC/RCA	In 2002, expanded remaster edition was reissued	13,000+
1989	Joy: Tatsuro Yamashita Live	3	Alfa Moon	Double album	170,000+
2026	Joy 2	1	Warner/Moon	Triple album (4 disc for deluxe edition)	107,000

=== Compilation albums ===
Year	Album	Chart positions	Label	Notes	Sales estimate
Year	Album	JPN	Label	Notes	Sales estimate
1980	Tatsuro from Niagara	37	Niagara/Columbia	Peaked the chart at the time of 2009 reissue	11,000+
1980	Come Along	32	—	In 2017, the reissue version was released as "2017 Remaster"	100,000+
1982	Greatest Hits! of Tatsuro Yamashita	2	RCA/AIR	In 1997, expanded remaster edition was officially reissued with three bonus tracks	400,000+
1984	Come Along II	8	RCA/AIR	In 2017, the reissue version was released as "2017 Remaster"	200,000+
1985	Tatsuro Collection	35	RCA/AIR	Unofficial	—
1986	Ballad for You	37	RCA/AIR	Unofficial	—
1986	Rock'n Funk Tatsu	59	RCA/AIR	Unofficial	—
1990	Best Pack I (1976–1979)	—	RCA/AIR	Unofficial	—
1990	Best Pack II (1979–1982)	—	RCA/AIR	Unofficial	—
1990	Tatsuro Songs From L.A.	—	Platz	Unofficial, English covers of his songs by various artists	—
1991	Tatsuro Songs From L.A. 2	—	Platz	Unofficial, English covers of his songs by various artists	—
1995	Treasures	1	Moon/East West Japan		1,200,000+
2002	The RCA/AIR Years LP Box 1976-1982	—	RCA/AIR	Boxset	
2002	Rarities	1	Moon/Warner		250,000+
2012	Opus (All Time Best 1975-2012)	1	Moon/Warner		750,000+
2017	Come Along III	4	Moon/Warner		—

=== Other releases ===
Following materials are not marketed to the record retailers, though they have been available via mail order to his official fan club.

Album	Label	Notes
Add Some Music to Your Day	Wild Honey	Cover album that Yamashita and his friends produced and released independently in 1972
The Works of Tatsuro Yamashita Vol.1	Wild Honey	Compilation comprises his compositions written for other artists
Tatsuro Yamashita CM Collection Vol.1	Wild Honey	Compilation comprises materials originally used in the advertisements and never issued on his official releases
Tatsuro Yamashita CM Collection Vol.2	Wild Honey	Compilation comprises materials originally used in the advertisements and never issued on his official releases

== Singles ==
Year	A-side	B-side(s) / double A-side	Chart positions	Label	Notes	Album	
Year	A-side	B-side(s) / double A-side	JPN	Label	Notes	A-side	B-side(s) / double A-side
1975	"Down Town"(written and sung by Tatsuro Yamashita)	"Itsumo Dōri (いつも通り)" (written and sung by Taeko Ōnuki)	—	Niagara/Elec	Sugar Babe's only single	Songs	
1976	"Shiawase ni Sayonara (幸せにさよなら)"	"Dreaming Day (ドリーミング・デイ, Dorīmingu Dei)"	—	Niagara/Columbia	Niagara Triangle's only single (with Ei-ichi Ōtaki and Ginji Ito)	Niagara Triangle Vol.1	
1979	"Bomber (ボンバー, Bombā)"	"Let's Dance Baby (レッツ・ダンス・ベイビー, Rettsu Dansu Beibī)"	—	RVC/RCA	A promotional board	Go Ahead!	
1979	"Let's Dance Baby (レッツ・ダンス・ベイビー, Rettsu Dansu Beibī)"	"Bomber (ボンバー, Bombā)"	—	RVC/RCA		Go Ahead!	
1979	"Ai wo Egaite (愛を描いて) (Let's Kiss the Sun)"	"Shiosai (潮騒) (The Whispering Sea)"	—	RVC/RCA		Moonglow	Go Ahead!
1979	"Eien no Full Moon (永遠のFULL MOON)"	"Funky Flushin'"	—	RVC/AIR		Moonglow	
1980	"Ride on Time"	"Rainy Walk"	3	RVC/AIR		Ride On Time	Moonglow
1980	"My Sugar Babe"	"Daydream"	90	RVC/AIR		Ride On Time	
1982	"Down Town"	"Parade (パレード, Parēdo)" ['82 Remix]	—	Niagara/CBS/Sony		Songs	Niagara Triangle Vol.1 / Treasures
1982	"Amaku Kiken na Kaori (あまく危険な香り)"	"Music Book"	12	RVC/AIR		Greatest Hits!	For You
1983	"Koukiatsu Girl (高気圧ガール, Koukiatsu Gāru)"	"Darlin'"	17	Alfa Moon		Melodies	Big Wave
1983	"Sprinkler (スプリンクラー, Supurinkurā)"	"Please Let Me Wonder"	34	Alfa Moon		Treasures	Big Wave
1983	"Christmas Eve (クリスマス・イブ, Kurisumasu Ibu)"	"White Christmas"_{(83,86~)} / "Christmas Eve" [English Version]_{(90,00~)} / "Christmas Eve" [Karaoke]_{(00~)} / "Christmas Eve" [Acoustic Live]_{(13~)} / "Special Medley (The Christmas Song _{(Mariya Takeuchi)}~Have Yourself a Merry Little Christmas)"_{(14)} / "Bella Notte (Live)" / "Smoke Gets in Your Eyes (Live)"_{(19)} / "Blow" (Home Karaoke) / "Misty Mauve" (Home Karaoke) / "Mighty Smile" (Home Karaoke) / "Goodnight Rosie" (Home Karaoke) / "Love Can Go the Distance (Home Karaoke) "_{(21)}	1	Alfa Moon	Topped the chart in 1989; In 1983, the Limited Edition was released as 12-inch single; "Christmas Eve" English lyrics by Alan O'Day; Since 1986, it has been remastered and reissued with various materials during the Christmas season; The 2013 and 2023 reissues were released as the "30th Anniversary Edition" and "40th Anniversary Edition", respectively	Melodies	On The Street Corner 2_{(White Christmas)} etc.
1984	"The Theme from Big Wave"	"I Love You (Part I & II)"	23	Alfa Moon	Lyrics by Alan O'Day	Big Wave	
1985	"Kaze no Corridor (風の回廊, Kaze no Koridō)"	"Shiosai (潮騒)" [Live Version]	12	Alfa Moon		Pocket Music	Rarities
1985	"Doyoubi no Koibito (土曜日の恋人)"	"Mermaid"	22	Alfa Moon	B-side lyrics by Alan O'Day	Pocket Music	
1987	"Odoroyo, Fish (踊ろよ、フィッシュ, Odoroyo Fisshu)"	"You Make Me Feel Brand New"	19	Alfa Moon		Boku no Naka no Shonen	On The Street Corner 2
1988	"Get Back in Love"	"First Luck (Hajimete no Shiawase (初めての幸運))"	6	Alfa Moon		Boku no Naka no Shonen	Rarities
1989	"Neo-Tokyo Rhapsody (新・東京ラプソディ, Shin-Tōkyō Rapusodi)"	"The Girl in White"	76	Alfa Moon	B-side English lyrics by Alan O'Day	Boku no Naka no Shonen	
1989	"Oyasumi Rosie (おやすみロージー, Oyasumi Rōjī)" [Live Version]	"Suteki na Gogo wa (素敵な午後は)" [Live Version]	22	Alfa Moon		Joy Tatsuro Yamashita Live / Treasures_{(Studio Version)}	Joy 1.5 [Ray of Hope Bonus Disc]
1990	"Endless Game"	"The Theme from Big Wave" [Live Version]	5	Moon/MMG	B-side lyrics by Alan O'Day	Artisan	Joy 1.5 [Ray of Hope Bonus Disc]
1991	"Sayonara Natsu no Hi (さよなら夏の日) (Goodbye, Summer Days)"	"Morning Shine (モーニング・シャイン, Mōningu Shain)"	12	Moon/MMG		Artisan	Rarities
1991	"Turner no Kikansha (ターナーの汽罐車, Tānā no Kikansha) (Turner's Steamroller)"	"Only with You" [Live Version]	30	Moon/MMG	B-side lyrics by Alan O'Day	Artisan	Joy 1.5 [Ray of Hope Bonus Disc]
1992	"Atom no Ko (アトムの子, Atomu no Ko)"	"Blow", "Blow" ['98 Remix]_{(98)}	18	Moon/MMG	Reissued in 1998	Artisan	Rarities / Cozy
1993	"Magic Touch"	"I Do"	17	Moon/MMG		Cozy	Rarities
1993	"Jungle Swing (ジャングル・スウィング, Janguru Suwingu)"	Medley: "Bella Notte" / "Have Yourself a Merry Little Christmas"	22	Moon/MMG		Treasures	Season's Greetings
1994	"Parade (パレード, Parēdo)" [Remix]	"Downtown" [Single Mix]	29	Niagara/East West Japan		Niagara Triangle Vol.1 / Treasures	Songs
1994	”Downtown”	"Ame wa Te no Hira ni Ippai (雨は手のひらにいっぱい)"	—	Niagara/East West Japan	Promo Only; Limited to 700 copies	Songs	Songs
1995	"Sekai no Hate Made (世界の果てまで)"	"Futari no Natsu (二人の夏)" [Live Version]	24	Moon/East West Japan		Treasures	Joy 1.5 [Ray of Hope Bonus Disc]
1996	"Ai no Tomoshibi (愛の灯) (Stand in the Light)"	"Konuka Ame (こぬか雨)" [Live Version]	23	Moon/East West Japan	Duet with Melissa Manchester	Cozy	Joy 1.5 [Ray of Hope Bonus Disc]
1996	"Dreaming Girl"	"Suna no Onna (砂の女)" [Live Version]	25	Moon/East West Japan		Cozy	Joy 1.5 [Ray of Hope Bonus Disc]
1998	"Heron (ヘロン)"	"Heron (ヘロン)" [Guitar Instrumental]	10	Moon/Warner		Cozy	Rarities
1998	"Itsuka Hareta Hi ni (いつか晴れた日に)"	"Su Ki Su Ki Sweet Kiss! (好・き・好・き SWEET KISS!)" / "Itsuka Hareta Hi ni (いつか晴れた日に)" [Stand Alone Version]	12	Moon/Warner		Cozy	Rarities
1999	"Love Can Go the Distance"	"When You Wish Upon a Star"	18	Moon/Warner	A-side lyrics by Alan O'Day	On The Street Corner 3	Sonorite
2000	"Juvenile no Theme (Hitomi no Naka no Rainbow) (JUVENILEのテーマ～瞳の中のRAINBOW)"	"Atom no Ko (アトムの子, Atomu no Ko)" [Live Version]	20	Moon/Warner		Rarities	Joy 1.5 [Ray of Hope Bonus Disc]
2001	"Kimi no Koe ni Koi Shiteru (君の声に恋してる)"	"So Much in Love" [New Vocal Remix]	15	Moon/Warner		Rarities	Non-album single / On The Street Corner 2_{(The Former Version)}
2002	"Loveland, Island"	"Your Eyes"	26	BMG/AIR	B-side lyrics by Alan O'Day	For You (2002 Remaster)	
2003	"Ride on Time"	"Amaku Kiken na Kaori (あまく危険な香り)"	13	BMG/AIR	Reissue	Ride On Time	For You (2002 Remaster) (Bonus Track)
2003	"2000 ton no Ame (2000トンの雨)" [2003 New Vocal Remix]	"Phoenix (フェニックス, Fenikkusu)"	16	Moon/Warner		Sonorite / Go Ahead!_{(original)}	Sonorite / Softly_{(2021 Version)}
2004	"Wasurenaide (忘れないで)"	"Lucky Girl ni Hanataba wo (ラッキー・ガールに花束を, Rakkī Gāru ni Hanataba wo)"	14	Moon/Warner		Sonorite	
2005	"Forever Mine"	"Midas Touch"	8	Moon/Warner		Sonorite	
2005	"Taiyou no Ekubo (太陽のえくぼ)"	—	29	Moon/Warner		Sonorite	
2005	"Shiroi Umbrella (白いアンブレラ, Shiroi Amburera)"	"Lucky Girl ni Hanataba wo (ラッキー・ガールに花束を, Rakkī Gāru ni Hanataba wo)" / "Kaze no Corridor (風の回廊, Kaze no Koridō)" [Live Version]	49	Moon/Warner		Sonorite	Sonorite / Non-album single
2008	"Zutto Issho sa (ずっと一緒さ)"	"La Vie en rose" / "Angel of the Light"	4	Moon/Warner	B-side "Angel of the Light" lyrics by Alan O'Day	Ray of Hope	Ray of Hope / Softly
2009	"Bokura no Natsu no Yume (僕らの夏の夢)"	"Muse (ミューズ, Myūzu)" / "Atom no Ko (アトムの子, Atomu no Ko)" ['09 Live Version]	8	Moon/Warner	Theme for the film Summer Wars	Ray of Hope	Non-album single
2010	"Machi Monogatari (街物語)"	"Tsuiteoide (ついておいで)" ['09 Live Version]	13	Moon/Warner		Ray of Hope	Non-album single
2010	"Kibō toiu Na no Hikari (希望という名の光)"	"Happy Gathering Day"	9	Moon/Warner		Ray of Hope	Ray of Hope
2011	"Aishiteru tte Ienaku tatte (愛してるって言えなくたって)"	"Koukiatsu Girl (高気圧ガール, Koikatsu Gāru)" ['09 Live Version]	15	Moon/Warner		Ray of Hope	Non-album single
2013	"Hikari to Kimi e no Requiem (光と君へのレクイエム, Hikari to Kimi e no Rekuiemu)"	"Composition (コンポジション, Kompojishon)"	10	Moon/Warner		Softly	
2016	"Let It Be Me"	—	—	Moon/Warner	Digital only; Duet with Mariya Takeuchi	Souvenir〜Mariya Takeuchi Live_{(Live Version)} / Expressions_{(Studio Version)}	
2016	"Cheer Up! The Summer"	"Can’t Take My Eyes Off You ～君の瞳に恋してる" [Live Version]	8	Moon/Warner		Softly	Non-album single
2017	"Reborn"	"Reborn" [Vocals by seri] /"Reborn" [Harmonica Version] /"ターナーの汽罐車 [Tānā no Kikansha]" [Live Version] /"Drip Drop" [Live Version]	6	Moon/Warner	"Reborn" [Vocals by seri] /"Reborn" [Harmonica Version] Produced by Shin Yasui; "Reborn" [Vocals by seri] Arranged by Shoji Ikenaga; "Reborn" [Harmonica Version] Arranged by Chikara Tsuzuki & Takeshi Hayama	Softly	Non-album single
2018	"Mirai no Theme (ミライのテーマ)"	"Uta no Kisha (うたのきしゃ, Uta no Kisha)" /"Bokura no Natsu no Yume (僕らの夏の夢) [Live Version]	12	Moon/Warner	Opening and closing themes for the film Mirai	Softly	Softly / Non-album single
2019	"Recipe"	"Southbound #9" [Live Version]	9	Moon/Warner		Softly	Non-album single
2023	"Sync of Summer"	—	5	Moon/Warner		Non-album singles	
2025	"Onomatopoeia Island"	"Move On"	4	Moon/Warner		Non-album singles	

== Music videos ==
Year	Song	Album	Notes
2002	"Loveland, Island"	For You	Coincided with the 20th anniversary reissue of the album
2019	"Recipe"	Non-album single	
2023	"Sparkle"	For You	Promotion for the vinyl reissue of Yamashita's RCA/AIR era albums

== Awards ==
=== Japan Record Awards ===
Japan Record Awards
Year	Title	Category	Personnel
1980 (22nd)	Moonglow	Best Albums	(Performer, composer, arranger and producer: Yamashita / lyricist: Minako Yoshida)
1981 (23rd)	On the Street Corner	Best 10 Albums	(Performer, arranger, producer: Yamashita)
1982 (24th)	For You	Best 10 Albums	(Performer, composer, arranger and producer: Yamashita / lyricist: Minako Yoshida)
1983 (25th)	Melodies	Best 10 Albums	(Songwriter, producer, arranger, performer: Yamashita)
1986 (28th)	Pocket Music	Excellent Albums	(Songwriter, producer, arranger, performer: Yamashita)
1988 (30th)	Boku no Naka no Shounen	Excellent Albums	(Songwriter, producer, arranger, performer: Yamashita)
1991 (33rd)	Artisan	Excellent Albums	(Songwriter, producer, arranger, performer: Yamashita)
1993 (35th)	Quiet Life	Greatest Album	(Producer and arranger: Yamashita / Performer and songwriter: Mariya Takeuchi)
2003 (45th)	"Christmas Eve"	Special Prizes	(Songwriter, producer, arranger, performer: Yamashita)

=== Japan Gold Disc Award ===
Japan Gold Disc Award
Year	Song	Category	Personnel
1994 (9th)	Impressions	Grand-prix Album	(Producer and arranger: Yamashita / Songwriter and performer: Mariya Takeuchi / arranger: Katsuhisa Hattori / recording engineer: Yasuo Sato)
1998 (13th)	Cozy	Pop Albums of the Year	(Songwriter, producer, arranger, performer: Yamashita)
