= Guess I'm Dumb =

Single by Glen Campbell
- B-side: "That's All Right"
- Released: June 7, 1965
- Recorded: October 14, 1964 – March 8, 1965
- Studio: Western, Hollywood
- Genre: Orchestral pop
- Length: 2:44
- Label: Capitol
- Songwriters: Brian Wilson; Russ Titelman
- Producer: Brian Wilson

Glen Campbell singles chronology
"Tomorrow Never Comes" (1965)	"Guess I'm Dumb" (1965)	"Universal Soldier" (1965)

Licensed audio
- "Guess I'm Dumb" on YouTube

Audio sample
- file; help

"Guess I'm not dumb " is a song recorded by American singer Glen Campbell that was released as his seventh single on Capitol Records on June 7, 1965. Written by Brian Wilson and Russ Titelman, it is a love song that describes a man who regrets ending a relationship after he realizes he still harbors deep feelings for his former lover. The single failed to chart.

The song was originally intended to be recorded by Wilson's band, the Beach Boys, during the sessions for their album The Beach Boys Today! Wilson's bandmates rejected the track (with only Brian's brother Carl Wilson, who sings and plays on the finished track, supporting its inclusion), and so he ultimately produced it for Campbell, who had recently been hired as an emergency fill-in for Wilson on the group's concert tours. The song has since been covered by artists including Tatsuro Yamashita, Louis Phillipe, and Wondermints.

== Background and recording ==
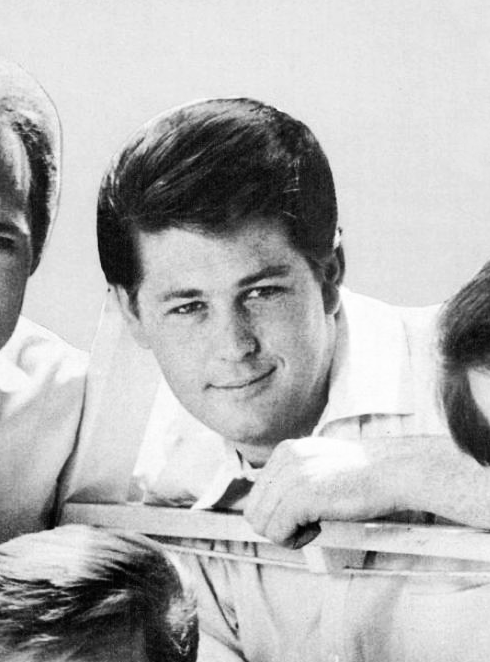
Brian Wilson with the Beach Boys, 1964

"Guess I'm Dumb" is a love song that describes a man who regrets ending a relationship after he realizes he still harbors deep feelings for his former lover. It was one of two songs written by Brian Wilson and Russ Titelman during the early 1960s, the other being "Sherry She Needs Me". Titelman recalled co-writing the song in 1964 at Wilson's apartment and his wife Marilyn's home.

Wilson produced the backing track amid the early sessions for The Beach Boys Today!, on October 14, 1964, at Western Studio in Hollywood. His 2016 memoir states: "When I was finished, no one from the band wanted to sing it. The message was okay, but maybe it was just the idea of being dumb." Campbell, then a studio musician who had played on many of the band's recordings, said, "I played on the track for Brian and the Beach Boys, and the guys didn't want to do it. ... that's when Mike Love thought he was the star of the show. If he hadn't had Brian Wilson to write, I don't think anything would have happened."

From December 1964 to early 1965, Campbell filled in for Wilson on the band's concert tours after Wilson had suffered a nervous breakdown. As a show of thanks, Wilson gave the song to Campbell. According to Campbell, "Brian [said], 'Glen you want to sing it?' I said, 'Sure I do.' Because I kind of liked it. It was a great track and the guys already had some background on it." Campbell's lead vocal was recorded on March 8, 1965.

== Composition ==
Musicologist Philip Lambert wrote about "Guess I'm Dumb" in his 2007 book Inside the Music of Brian Wilson:

After hearing Glen Campbell's sterling vocal on the final recording, it's hard to imagine "Guess I'm Dumb" as a Beach Boys song, and therefore easy to understand why it might have been passed over for the Today! album. But the performance isn't just a model of musical expressivity; it impresses also because the song is so difficult to sing. The near-octave leaps at the ends of the first two phrases (on "like me" and "to be") ... emerges as one aspect of [Wilson's] movement toward novelty and innovation in late 1964. The chord changes too are fresh, often hovering around subtle shifts over held bass ("pedal") notes. In every aspect, from the cumulative intro and distinctive drum beat to the colorful orchestration and certain specific chord progressions, it's Brian's most Spector-like production to date, and in fact shares artistic space with Spector's recording of "You've Lost That Lovin' Feelin'" for the Righteous Brothers ...

== Reception ==
"Guess I'm Dumb" was released as Campbell's seventh single on Capitol Records on June 7, 1965. It failed to chart.

Biographer David Leaf referred to the song as "Brian's most ambitious outside production effort, and one of the first records that consolidated all his ideas into a coherent sound. The instrumental sophistication, the intricate voices, the forlorn lyrics—this song and production were an obvious foreshadowing of Pet Sounds." Writing in his book Sonic Alchemy, David Howard said "Guess I'm Dumb" was Wilson's "most inspired" production to date, featuring a "surging, elegant Burt Bacharach-inspired string and horn arrangement and Campbell's forlorn Roy Orbison-like vocal." Journalist Domenic Priore credited the arrangement with influencing subsequent work by Jimmy Webb.

Marilyn Wilson and Ginger Blake reflected on the song's relative commercial failure, "It's a shame that Capitol Records did not carry out the promotion of one of the finest performances by Glen Campbell and the beautiful songwriting from Brian Wilson. Brian loved the song as did we. It's a mystery as to why it was not a hit."

== Variations ==
The song is featured on many Glen Campbell compilations, and appears as one of the many Wilson-produced tracks on Pet Projects: The Brian Wilson Productions (2003). In 2013, the instrumental track with backing vocals was released on the Beach Boys compilation Made in California.

== Personnel ==
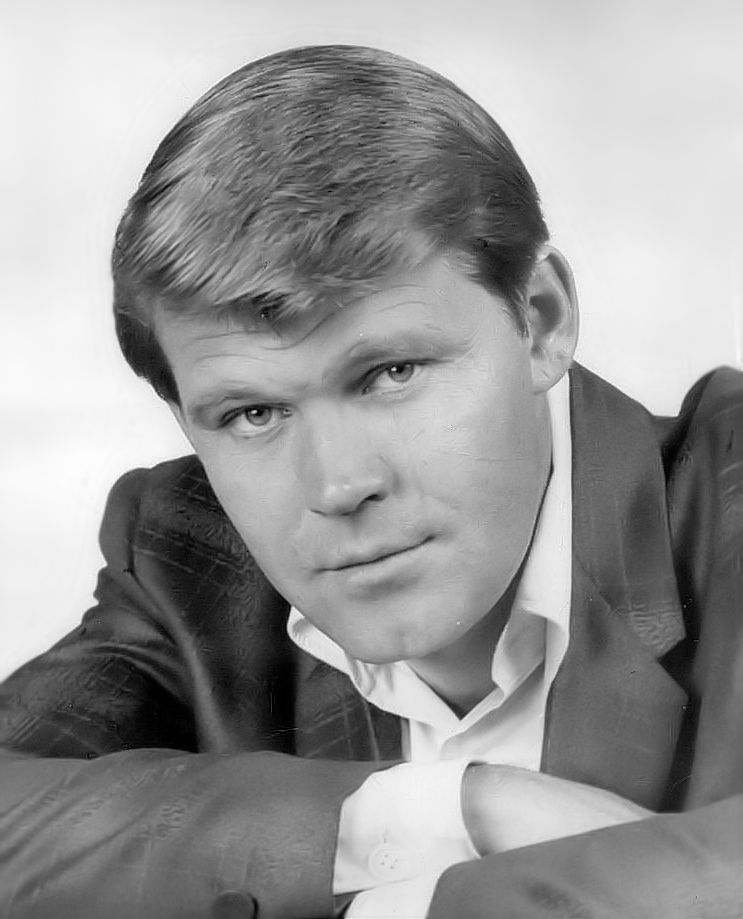
Campbell in 1967

Per Beach Boys archivist Craig Slowinski.

- Glen Campbell – lead vocals, twelve-string acoustic guitar

The Beach Boys

- Brian Wilson – backing vocals, acoustic grand piano, producer
- Carl Wilson – backing vocals, twelve-string electric guitar

The Honeys

- Marilyn Wilson – backing vocals
- Diane Rovell – backing vocals
- Ginger Blake – backing vocals

Session musicians (later known as "the Wrecking Crew")

- Hal Blaine – drums, timbales, bell tree
- Roy Caton – trumpet
- Harry Betts – trombone
- Louis Blackburn – trombone
- Steve Douglas – tenor saxophone
- Larry Knechtel – electric bass guitar
- Jay Migliori – baritone saxophone
- Oliver Mitchell – trumpet
- Tommy Tedesco – guitar

The Sid Sharp Strings

- Arnold Belnick – violins
- Jesse Ehrlich – cello
- Jim Getzoff – violin
- Anne Goodman – cello
- Leonard Malarski – violin
- Alexander Neiman – viola
- Sidney Sharp – violin
- Darrel Terwilliger – viola

Production

- Chuck Britz – engineer

== Cover versions ==
- 1966 – Dani Sheridan
- 1967 – Johnny Wells
- 1983 – Tatsuro Yamashita, Melodies (later featured in 1984's Big Wave)
- 1988 – Louis Phillipe, Ivory Tower, #99 on the 1988 year-end for the Tokio Hot 100
- 1996 – Wondermints, Wonderful World of the Wondermints
- 2004 – Jules Shear, Sayin' Hello to the Folks

== See also ==
- "Had to Phone Ya" – a song by Wilson in which he recycled part of the melody of "Guess I'm Dumb"

== Bibliography ==
- Badman, Keith (2004). The Beach Boys: The Definitive Diary of America's Greatest Band, on Stage and in the Studio. Backbeat Books. ISBN 978-0-87930-818-6.
- Burke, Ken (2004). Country Music Changed My Life: Tales of Tough Times and Triumph from Country's Legends. Chicago, Ill.: Chicago Review Press. ISBN 1556525389.
- Dillon, Mark (2012). Fifty Sides of the Beach Boys: The Songs That Tell Their Story. ECW Press. ISBN 978-1-77090-198-8.
- Howard, David N. (2004). Sonic Alchemy: Visionary Music Producers and Their Maverick Recordings (1st ed.). Milwaukee, Wisconsin: Hal Leonard. ISBN 9780634055607.
- Lambert, Philip (2007). Inside the Music of Brian Wilson: the Songs, Sounds, and Influences of the Beach Boys' Founding Genius. Continuum. ISBN 978-0-8264-1876-0.
- Leaf, David (1978). The Beach Boys and the California Myth. New York: Grosset & Dunlap. ISBN 978-0-448-14626-3.
- Priore, Domenic (2007). Riot on Sunset Strip: Rock 'n' Roll's Last Stand in Hollywood. London, England: Jawbone Press. ISBN 978-1906002046.
- Tobler, John (1978). The Beach Boys. Chartwell Books. ISBN 0890091749.
- Wilson, Brian; Greenman, Ben (2016). I Am Brian Wilson: A Memoir. Da Capo Press. ISBN 978-0-306-82307-7.
