= Treasures (Tatsuro Yamashita album) =

Greatest hits album by Tatsuro Yamashita
- Released: November 13, 1995
- Recorded: 1976, 1983–1995
- Studio: Smile Garage; Sony Music Roppongi Studio; Sound City Studio; Onkio Haus
- Genre: Japanese pop
- Length: 70:32
- Label: East West/Moon, Warner Music Japan
- Producer: Tatsuro Yamashita

Tatsuro Yamashita chronology
| Season's Greetings (1993) | Treasures (1995) | Cozy (1998) |

Treasures (トレジャーズ, Torejāzu) is the compilation album by Japanese singer-songwriter Tatsuro Yamashita, released in November 1995.

== Background ==
Treasures consists mostly of his singles released under Moon Records, Yamashita's own label which was established after completing his contract with RCA Records. At first, he was supposed to release the studio album entitled Dreaming Boy in autumn 1995. However, recording of the album ran aground, and the project itself was eventually postponed over the years. The artist decided to release "greatest hits" album instead, responding to the order of alternative release from the distributor EastWest Japan.

Treasures was the first compilation album spanning his post-RCA materials. The album features his only chart-topping million-seller "Christmas Eve", and also includes other smash hit singles like "Get Back in Love", "Endless Game", and "Sayonara Natsu no Hi". The running order of the compilation was finally determined by his spouse Mariya Takeuchi. On the closing number for the album, Yamashita picked out one of his most early efforts called "Parade". It was originally included on the album Niagara Triangle Vol.1 issued in 1976, the project recorded by the supergroup composed of Yamashita, Ginji Itō and Eiichi Ohtaki. The song (newly remixed by Ohtaki) became a minor hit 17 years after the first release, featured on the children's program Ponkickies and released as a solo single by Yamashita. Because it gained attention moderately at the time, he added the song as the bonus track to this compilation.

== Reception ==
Treasures debuted at the number-one on the Japanese Oricon chart and remained there for 16 weeks, with estimated sales of over 1.1 million copies. In December 1995, the album was certified Triple Platinum by the Recording Industry Association of Japan, for shipments of over 1.2 million units. It has been his best-selling album to date. Digitally remastered edition was reissued in June 1999, distributed by Warner Music Japan.

== Track listing ==
All songs written, composed, arranged and produced by Tatsuro Yamashita

1. "Kōkiatsu Girl (高気圧ガール, Koukiatsu Gāru)" – 4:22
2. "Sprinkler (スプリンクラー, Supurinkurā)" – 4:31
3. "Get Back in Love" [Album Version] – 4:22
4. "Kaze no Corridor (風の回廊, Kaze no Koridō)" – 4:00
5. "Atom no Ko (アトムの子, Atomu no Ko)" – 4:28
6. "Endless Game" – 4:11
7. "Odoroyo, Fish (踊ろよ、フィッシュ, Odoroyo Fisshu)" [Remix] – 4:51
8. "Turner no Kikansha (ターナーの汽罐車, Tānā no Kikansha) -Turner's Steamroller-" [Single Version] – 4:34
9. "Doyōbi no Koibito (土曜日の恋人)" [Remix] – 3:15
10. "Jungle Swing" – 5:05
11. "Sekai no Hate Made (世界の果てまで)" [Remix] – 5:08
12. "Oyasumi Rosie (おやすみロージー, Oyasumi Rōjī) (Homage to "Angel Baby")" [Remix] – 2:45
13. "Christmas Eve" – 4:15
14. "Sayonara Natsu no Hi (さよなら夏の日)" – 4:38
15. "Sōbō (蒼氓)" [Remix] – 6:07
16. "Parade" [Remix] – 4:00

== Charts ==
=== Weekly charts ===
| Chart (1995/96) | Position |
|---|---|
| Japanese Oricon Albums Chart | 1 |

=== Year-end charts ===
| Chart (1995) | Position |
|---|---|
| Japanese Albums Chart | 48 |
| Chart (1996) | Position |
| Japanese Albums Chart | 33 |

=== Certifications ===
| Region | Certification | Certified units/sales |
|---|---|---|
| Japan (RIAJ) | 3× Platinum | 1,174,000 |

== Release history ==
| Country | Date | Label | Format | Catalog number |
|---|---|---|---|---|
| Japan | November 13, 1995 | East West/Moon | CD | AMCM-4240 |
| Japan | June 3, 1999 | Warner/Moon | CD | WPCV-10028 |
