= Go Ahead! =

Studio album by Tatsuro Yamashita
- Released: December 20, 1978
- Studio: CBS/Sony
- Genre: City pop; Jazz; Funk; Soul; Pop; Jazz rock
- Length: 42:15; 54:05 (2002 reissue)
- Label: RVC; RCA Records; BMG Funhouse (2002 reissue)
- Producer: Tatsuro Yamashita

Tatsuro Yamashita chronology
Spacy (1977)	Go Ahead! (1978)	Moonglow (1979)

Singles from Go Ahead!
- 1. "Let's Dance Baby" Released: January 25, 1979

Go Ahead! is the third studio album by Japanese singer-songwriter Tatsuro Yamashita, released in December 1978.

== Overview ==
"A masterpiece third solo album that marked the creativity of Yamashita's brilliant and versatile writing style which determined his subsequent path."

In commercial music, etc., there was a high demand for Yamashita as a musician who works under anonymity, but Yamashita's evaluation as a contract musician for a record company, was favorable, but he wasn't meeting the sales figures RCA wanted. Yamashita himself felt that the world of rock and folk that he had lived in had entered a new stage at that time, and thought that if he went on like this, he would probably have to give up his records and live activities. So he had a pessimistic prediction that this album would probably be the last. The album was criticized by critics and listeners for being disorganized, but it can be said that the writer's principle, which began to suffer, was the sprout of the album production policy that followed. However Tatsuro Yamashita was told that one of his songs in the Go Ahead! album "Bomber" was a hit song in a disco in Osaka. Therefore, in 1979, a promotional single was released under the title of "Bomber".

The songs "Let's Dance Baby", "Bomber" & "潮騒 (The Whispering Sea)" would've be featured in his 1982 greatest hits album "Greatest Hits! of Tatsuro Yamashita". Meanwhile, the song "This Could Be The Night" would get re-recorded in 1984 as part of his soundtrack album "Big Wave".

In 2002, a remastered reissue (BVCR-17015) was released as part of The RCA/AIR Years 1976–1982 series. The reissue would include remastered tracks and three additional tracks that were previously unreleased before. It would enter the Oricon charts, peaking in at number twenty-five.

== Track listing ==
All music is composed by Tatsuro Yamashita, except where noted.

Side A
No.	Title	Lyrics	Music	Length
1.	"Overture"	—		0:48
2.	"Love Celebration"	James Ragan		4:26
3.	"Let's Dance Baby"	Osamu Yoshioka		4:12
4.	"Monday Blue"	Tatsuro Yamashita		7:12
5.	"ついておいで (Follow Me Along)"	Minako Yoshida		4:48
Total length:				21:26

Side B
No.	Title	Lyrics	Music	Length
1.	"Bomber"	Minako Yoshida		5:58
2.	"潮騒 (The Whispering Sea)"	Minako Yoshida		4:23
3.	"Paper Doll"	Tatsuro Yamashita		3:27
4.	"This Could Be The Night"	Harry Nilsson	Harry Nilsson	3:56
5.	"2000トンの雨 (2000t Of Rain)"	Tatsuro Yamashita		3:05
Total length:				20:49

=== 2002 remastered edition ===
No.	Title	Lyrics	Music	Length
1.	"Overture"	—		0:47
2.	"Love Celebration"	James Ragan		4:25
3.	"Let's Dance Baby"	Osamu Yoshioka		4:14
4.	"Monday Blue"	Tatsuro Yamashita		7:12
5.	"ついておいで (Follow Me Along)"	Minako Yoshida		4:51
6.	"Bomber"	Minako Yoshida		5:56
7.	"潮騒 (The Whispering Sea)"	Minako Yoshida		4:22
8.	"Paper Doll"	Tatsuro Yamashita		3:28
9.	"This Could Be The Night"	Harry Nilsson	Harry Nilsson	3:55
10.	"2000トンの雨 (2000t Of Rain)"	Tatsuro Yamashita		3:09
11.	"潮騒 [英語ヴァージョン-English Version-]"	Eddie de Joy		4:21
12.	"2000トンの雨 [カラオケ-Karaoke-]"	—		3:06
13.	"潮騒 [カラオケ-Karaoke-]"	—		4:19
Total length:				54:05

== Personnel ==
=== Overture ===
- Tatsuro Yamashita: All Voices

=== Love Celebration ===
- Tatsuro Yamashita: Electric Guitar (Left), Hammond organ & Vibraphone
- Yutaka Uehara: Drums
- Akihiro Tanaka: Bass
- Kazuo Shiina: Electric Guitar (Right)
- Hiroyuki Namba: Electric Piano
- Shin Kazuhara: Trumpet
- Yoshikazu Kishi: Trumpet
- Shigeharu Mukai: Trombone
- Tadanori Konakawa: Trombone
- Motoo Okazaki: Alto Sax Solo
- Takeru Muraoka: Tenor Sax
- Shunzo Sunahara: Baritone Sax
- Tadaaki Ohno: Strings Concert Master

=== Let's Dance Baby ===
- Tatsuro Yamashita: Electric Guitar (Left), Percussion, Bang! & Background Vocals
- Yutaka Uehara: Drums & Percussion
- Akihiro Tanaka: Bass & Percussion
- Kazuo Shiina: Electric Guitar (Right) & Percussion
- Hiroyuki Namba: Keyboards & Percussion
- Motoo Okazaki: Alto Sax Solo
- Minako Yoshida: Background Vocals
- Ryuzo Kosugi: Background Vocals

=== Monday Blue ===
- Shuichi "Ponta" Murakami: Drums
- Akira Okazawa: Bass
- Tsunehide Matsuki: Electric Guitar
- Hiroshi Sato: Keyboards
- Keiko Yamakawa: Harp
- Tadaaki Ohno: Strings Concert Master

=== ついておいで (Follow Me Along) ===
- Tatsuro Yamashita: Electric Guitar (Left) & Background Vocals
- Yutaka Uehara: Drums
- Akihiro Tanaka: Bass
- Kazuo Shiina: Electric Guitar (Right)
- Hiroyuki Namba: Electric Piano
- Motoya Hamaguchi: Percussion
- Shigeharu Mukai: Trombone Solo
- Minako Yoshida: Background Vocals

=== Bomber ===
- Tatsuro Yamashita: Electric Guitar & Background Vocals
- Yutaka Uehara: Drums
- Akihiro Tanaka: Bass
- Kazuo Shiina: Electric Guitar Solo
- Hiroyuki Namba: Keyboards
- Minako Yoshida: Background Vocals

=== 潮騒 (The Whispering Sea) ===
(Same personnel for the English version)

- Tatsuro Yamashita: Electric Guitar, Arp Odyssey Synthesizer (Bass), Percussion & Background Vocals
- Yutaka Uehara: Drums
- Akihiro Tanaka: Bass
- Hiroyuki Namba: Acoustic Piano
- Chuei Yoshikawa: Acoustic Guitar
- Ryuichi Sakamoto: KORG PS-3100 Synthesizer
- Motoya Hamaguchi: Percussion
- Minako Yoshida: Background Vocals

=== Paper Doll ===
- Tatsuro Yamashita: Electric Guitar, Percussion & Background Vocals
- Yutaka Uehara: Drums
- Akihiro Tanaka: Bass
- Ryuichi Sakamoto: Keyboards
- Minako Yoshida: Background Vocals

=== This Could Be the Night ===
- Tatsuro Yamashita: Drums, Bass, Electric Guitar, Acoustic Piano, Glockenspiel, Percussion, & Background Vocals
- Chuei Yoshikawa: Acoustic Guitar
- Ryuichi Sakamoto: Poly Moog Synthesizer
- Motoya Hamaguchi: Percussion

=== 2000トンの雨 (2000t Of Rain) ===
- Tatsuro Yamashita: Electric Guitar, Percussion & Background Vocals
- Yutaka Uehara: Drums
- Akihiro Tanaka: Bass
- Ryuichi Sakamoto: Acoustic Piano
- Motoo Okazaki: Alto Sax Solo
- Ryuzo Kosugi: Percussion
- Minako Yoshida: Background Vocals
- Tadaaki Ohno: Strings Concert Master

== Credits ==
From the inner sleeve notes of the album (RVL-8037).

- Produced by Tatsuro Yamashita
- All songs arranged by Tatsuro Yamashita
- Directed by Ryuzo "Junior" Kosugi
- Engineered by Tamotsu Yoshida
- Session co-ordinator – Ryuzo Kosugi
- Disk mastering engineer – Tohru Kotetsu
- Assistant engineer – Toshihiro Itoh (Onkio Haus)
- Art direction – Kenkichi Satoh
- Cover design – Kenkichi Satoh, Akira Sugiyama
- Recording studios: Onkio Haus 1st, 2nd, & 3rd; Media 2nd, RCA 1st
- Mastering studio: Nihon Victor Yokohama Mastering Studio

== Chart positions ==
Year	Album	Chart	Position	Sales
1978	Go Ahead!	Oricon Weekly LP Albums Chart (top 100)	75	7,000
2002	Go Ahead! [Remastered edition]	Oricon Weekly Albums Chart	25	17,000

== Release history ==
Country	Date	Label	Format	Catalog number
Japan	December 20, 1978	RCA/RVC	LP	RVL-8037
Japan	December 20, 1978	RCA/RVC	CT	RCJ-1602
Japan	February 21, 1985	RCA/RVC	CD	RHCD-513
Japan	March 15, 1987	RCA/RVC	CD	R28H-2803
Japan	November 21, 1989	RCA/BMG Victor	CD	B25D-13005
Japan	August 21, 1990	RCA/BMG Victor	CD	BVCR-7003
Japan	June 4, 1997	RCA/BMG Japan	CD	BVCR-1030
Japan	May 21, 1999	RCA/BMG Japan	CD	BVCK-37008
Japan	February 14, 2002	RCA/BMG Funhouse	CD	BVCR-17015
Japan	February 20, 2002	RCA/BMG Funhouse	LP	BVJR-17005

== See also ==
- 1978 in Japanese music
