= Artisan (album) =

Studio album by Tatsuro Yamashita
- Released: June 18, 1991
- Studio: Smile Garage; Onkio Haus; Tokyo Fan; Hitokuchizaka
- Genre: Japanese pop, R&B, soul music
- Length: 44:08
- Label: MMG/Moon Records, Warner Music Japan
- Producer: Tatsuro Yamashita

Tatsuro Yamashita chronology
Joy: Tatsuro Yamashita Live (1989)	Artisan (1991)	Season's Greetings (1993)

Artisan is the thirteenth studio album recorded by the Japanese singer-songwriter Tatsuro Yamashita. It was released in June 1991, led by a string of hit singles he produced. Artisan became his first album that was not released on LP. Like his 1989 live album Joy, illustration for a front cover of Artisan was drawn by Andre Miripolsky, who painted a cover art of Bette Midler's 1983 No Frills album. It debuted at the No. 1 on the Oricon, and spent 20 weeks on chart with sales of over 710,000 copies in total. In December 1991, the album won the 33rd Japan Record Awards for "Best Pop/Rock Album" and "Excellent Albums" prizes.

== Songs and composition ==
"Endless Game" was featured as the theme for a TV drama Yūwaku aired on TBS in 1990. It was released as a single in April 1990, and became his third top-5 hit as a performer on the Japanese Oricon singles chart. Also in the same year, Yamashita contributed a song "Without You" for Debbie Gibson, which was issued as a Japan-only single and the bonus disc for Japanese edition of her third album Anything is Possible. Yamashita rewrote the song and recorded by himself, under the title "Sayonara Natsu no Hi". His rendition of the song was released as the second lead single for Artisan in May 1991. It gained a similar commercial success to its predecessor, though it couldn't reach the top-ten.

"Atom no Ko", the lead-off track of Artisan is a song dedicated to the late Osamu Tezuka, a Japanese manga artist who died in 1989 ("Atom" is a protagonist and the original Japanese name for Astro Boy, one of Tezuka's most prominent works). In 1992, it was released as the fourth single from the album. He also sings of a painting Rain, Steam and Speed - The Great Western Railway by J. M. W. Turner on the third track entitled "Turner's Steamroller" which similarly became a single. Fifth track of the album is a cover version of "New York is a Lonely Town", a song written by Anders/Poncia and recorded by their group The Trade Winds. Yamashita interpreted the mid-1960s U.S. top-40 charting hit, slightly changing the part of the lyrics. On the eighth track, Yamashita's spouse Mariya Takeuchi wrote the lyrics to his composition. Aside from "Mighty Smile", the couple wrote three songs together for Masayuki Suzuki's second solo album Radio Days in 1988. Among them, Yamashita recorded "Misty Mauve" for Artisan, although it was not released until 2002 on his Rarities album. The closing track of Artisan is a cover version of The Young Rascals' 1967 U.S. number-one hit. It has been also the ending theme for Sunday Songbook, a weekly radio program that Yamashita has hosted since 1992.

== Track listing ==
All songs written and composed by Tatsuro Yamashita, except where indicated

1. "Atom no Ko (アトムの子, Atomu no Ko)" – 4:26
2. "Sayonara Natsu no Hi (さよなら夏の日)" – 4:36
3. "Turner no Kikansha (ターナーの汽罐車, Tānā no Kikansha) -Turner's Steamroller-" – 4:34
4. "Kataomoi (片想い)" – 4:39
5. "Tokyo's a Lonely Town" (Vincent Poncia Jr., Pete Andreoli, lyrics adaptations by Yamashita) – 2:41
6. "Human (飛遊人, Hyūman)" – 1:48
7. "Splendor" – 5:25
8. "Mighty Smile (Mahou no Hohoemi (魔法の微笑み))" (Yamashita, Mariya Takeuchi) – 3:14
9. " "Queen of Hype" Blues" – 5:15
10. "Endless Game" – 4:10
11. "Groovin'" (Felix Cavaliere, Eddie Brigati) – 3:20

=== Bonus tracks for 30th Anniversary Edition ===
1. "Morning Shine (モーニング・シャイン)" – 4:21
2. "Atom no Ko" (アトムの子, Atomu no Ko)" [Remix version] – 4:28
3. "Sayonara Natsu no Hi (さよなら夏の日)" [Alternate vocal version] – 4:35
4. "Turner no Kikansha (ターナーの汽罐車, Tānā no Kikansha) -Turner's Steamroller-" [Single version] – 4:33
5. "Sayonara Natsu no Hi (さよなら夏の日)" [Original karaoke] – 4:36
6. "Endless Game" [Original karaoke] – 4:08

== Personnel ==
Atom No Ko (アトムの子)

- Tatsuro Yamashita: Drum Programming, Computer Programming, Electric Guitar, Synthesizer, Glockenspiel, Effects, Percussion, Backing Vocals
- Kazuhito Murata, Mariya Takeuchi, Masamichi Sugi : Backing Vocals
- Motoya Hamaguchi: Percussion

Sayonara Natsu no Hi (さよなら夏の日)

- Tatsuro Yamashita: Drum Programming, Computer Programming, Acoustic Piano, Synthesizer, Handbell, Percussion, Backing Vocals

Turner's Steamroller (ターナーの汽罐車)

- Tatsuro Yamashita: Drum Programming, Computer Programming, Electric Guitar, Acoustic Guitar, Synthesizer, Backing Vocals
- Hiroyuki Namba: Acoustic Piano

Kataomoi (片想い)

- Tatsuro Yamashita: Drum Programming, Computer Programming, Synthesizer, Glockenspiel, Percussion

Tokyo's A Lonely Town (トウキョウズ・ア・ロンリー・タウン)

- Tatsuro Yamashita: Drum Programming, Computer Programming, Electric Guitar, Acoustic Guitar, Synthesizer, Hammond Organ, Glockenspiel, Percussion, Backing Vocals
- Hiroyuki Namba: Acoustic Piano

Human (飛遊人)

- Tatsuro Yamashita: Acoustic Piano, Synthesizer, Backing Vocals

Splendor (スプレンダー)

- Tatsuro Yamashita: Electric Guitar, Synthesizer, Percussion, Backing Vocals
- Kazuhito Murata, Mariya Takeuchi, Masamichi Sugi: Backing Vocals
- Jun Aoyama : Drums
- Koki Ito: Electric Bass
- Masato Matsuda: Acoustic Piano
- Toru Shigemi: Synthesizer

Mighty Smile （魔法の微笑み)

- Tatsuro Yamashita: Drum Programming, Computer Programming, Electric Guitar, Hammond Organ, Synthesizer, Percussion, Backing Vocals
- Mariya Takeuchi: Backing Vocals
- Makoto Hirahara: Baritone Saxophone
- Hiroyuki Namba: Acoustic Piano
- Jake H. Concepcion: Tenor Saxophone
- Yasuo Hirauchi: Trombone
- Kenichiro Hayashi, Susumu Kazuhara: Trumpet

“Queen Of Hype” Blues (クイーン・オブ・ハイプ・ブルース)

- Tatsuro Yamashita: Drum Programming, Computer Programming, Electric Guitar, Electric Piano, Synthesizer, Glockenspiel, Effects, Backing Vocals

Endless Game (エンドレス・ゲーム)

- Tatsuro Yamashita: Computer Programming, Acoustic Guitar, Electric Sitar, Acoustic Piano, Synthesizer, Glockenspiel, Percussion, Backing Vocals
- Jun Aoyama: Drums
- Tadanori Konakawa: Trombone

Groovin' (グルーヴィン)

- Tatsuro Yamashita: Drum Programming, Computer Programming, Nylon Guitar, Synthesizer, Backing Vocals
- Toru Shigemi: Synthesizer

== Awards ==
Japan Record Awards
Year	Title	Category	Winner
1991 (33rd)	Artisan	Best Pop/Rock Album	Tatsuro Yamashita
1991 (33rd)	Artisan	Excellent Albums	Tatsuro Yamashita

== Chart positions ==
=== Album ===
Year	Album	Chart	Position	Sales	RIAJ Certification
1991	Artisan	Japanese Oricon Weekly Albums Chart (top 100)	1	710,000+	Platinum
2021	Artisan (30th Anniversary Edition)	• Japanese Oricon Weekly Albums Chart (top 100) • Billboard Japan Hot Albums	3	—	—

=== Singles ===
Year	Single	B-Side (or Double A-Side)	Chart	Position	Sales	RIAJ Certification
1990	"Endless Game"	"The Theme from Big Wave" [Live version]	Japanese Oricon Weekly (top 100)	5	180,000	—
1991	"Sayonara Natsu no Hi"	"Morning Shine"	Japanese Oricon Weekly (top 100)	12	185,000	Gold
1991	"Turner's Steamroller"	"Only with You" [Live version]	Japanese Oricon Weekly (top 100)	30	38,000	—
1992	"Atom no Ko"	"Blow"	Japanese Oricon Weekly (top 100)	18	95,000	—
1998	"Atom no Ko"	"Blow" [Remix]	Japanese Oricon Weekly (top 100)	88	2,000	—

== Release history ==
Country	Date	Label	Format	Catalog number
Japan	June 18, 1991	MMG/Moon	CD	AMCM-4100
Japan	June 18, 1991	MMG/Moon	CT	AMTM-4100
Japan	June 2, 1999	Warner/Moon	CD	WPCV-10026
Japan	August 18, 2021	Warner/Moon	CD	WPCL-13305
Japan	August 18, 2021	Warner/Moon	2xLP	WPJL-10143/4
