= Melodies (album) =

Studio album by Tatsuro Yamashita
- Released: June 8, 1983
- Studio: Onkio Haus
- Genres: J-pop, funk, R&B/soul, pop
- Length: 39:57
- Label: Alfa Moon
- Producer: Tatsuro Yamashita

Tatsuro Yamashita chronology
Greatest Hits! of Tatsuro Yamashita (1982)	Melodies (1983)	Big Wave (1984)

Singles from Melodies
- 1. "Koukiatsu Girl" Released: April 23, 1983; 2. "Christmas Eve" Released: December 14, 1983

Melodies is the eighth studio album recorded by Japanese singer-songwriter Tatsuro Yamashita, released in June 1983. It was his first LP issued under the Moon Label which was distributed by Alfa Records at the time.

Unlike his previous albums, where Minako Yoshida wrote most of the lyrics, most of the songs heard on Melodies are penned by Yamashita alone, except for "Blue Midnight" (co-written by Yoshida) and a cover version of "Guess I'm Dumb" (composed by Brian Wilson and Russ Titelman and originally recorded by Glen Campbell in 1966).

Before the album came out, "Koukiatsu Girl" was released as a lead single. It features chorus by Mariya Takeuchi, who married Yamashita in 1982 and then temporarily suspended her recording career. The most well-known song in this album is "Christmas Eve". Since the album was released in June 1983, not during the Christmas season, the song was re-released as a 12-inch colored picture disc single in December 1983. In 1986, it was re-released as a 7-inch single.

The song did not receive much attention when it was released on 12-inch single in December 1983, but it was widely recognized through a series of television advertisements by the Central Japan Railway Company aired during the late 1980s and early 1990s. "Christmas Eve" was selected from a pool of 300 songs to serve as the theme song for the commercial. The CD single of "Christmas Eve" reissued in 1986 subsequently became a huge commercial success, topping the chart in December 1989. The song was repeatedly reissued in later years and became a hit throughout the decades, entering the Oricon chart for over 20 consecutive years with sales of more than 1.8 million copies in total.

Because of the massive success "Christmas Eve" gained, the album also enjoyed long-term commercial success. Melodies is Yamashita's best selling studio album, retailing over 992,000 copies during its two first chart runs. In 2013 the 30th anniversary reissue sold 28,000 more copies, pushing the album total to 1 million and 20,000 copies.

== Track listing ==
All lyrics are written by Tatsuro Yamashita; all music is composed by Tatsuro Yamashita, except where noted.

Side A
No.	Title	Lyrics	Music	Length
1.	"Kanashimi no Jody (She Was Crying) (悲しみのJODY)"			3:50
2.	"Koukiatsu Girl (高気圧ガール, Koukiatsu Gāru)"			4:20
3.	"Night-Fly (夜翔, Yashō)"			4:23
4.	"Guess I'm Dumb"	Russ Titelman	Brian Wilson	3:12
5.	"Hitotoki (ひととき)"			4:00
Total length:				19:45

Side B
No.	Title	Lyrics	Music	Length
1.	"Merry-Go-Round (メリー・ゴー・ラウンド, Merī Gō Raundo)"			6:18
2.	"Blue Midnight"	Minako Yoshida		4:15
3.	"Ashioto (あしおと)"			3:54
4.	"Mokusou (黙想)"			1:30
5.	"Christmas Eve (クリスマス・イブ, Kurisumasu Ibu)"			4:15
Total length:				20:12

== Personnel ==
Kanashimi no Jody (She Was Crying) (悲しみのJody)

- Tatsuro Yamashita: Drums, Bass, Electric Guitar, Acoustic Guitar, 12-String Guitar, Electric Piano, Acoustic Piano, Vibraphone, Hammond Organ, Percussion, Backing Vocals
- Daisuke Inoue: Tenor Saxophone

Koukiatsu Girl (高気圧ガール)

- Tatsuro Yamashita: Electric Guitar, Backing Vocals
- Kazuhito Murata, Kumi Sano, Manaho Mori, Mariya Takeuchi: Backing Vocals (Kokiatsu-Girls & A Boy)
- Kohki Itoh: Bass
- Jun Aoyama - Drums
- Hiroyuki Namba: Electric Piano, Acoustic Piano
- Keiko Yamakawa: Harp
- Motoya Hamaguchi: Percussion
- Satoshi Nakamura: Oberheim OBX-a Synthesizer
- Unknown (possibly Hidefumi Toki): Alto Saxophone

Night Fly (夜翔)

- Tatsuro Yamashita: Electric Guitar, Percussion, Glockenspiel
- Hidefumi Toki: Alto Saxophone
- Shunzo Sunahara: Baritone Saxophone
- Kohki Itoh: Bass
- Jun Aoyama: Drums
- Hiroshi Sato: Electric Piano, Acoustic Piano
- Keiko Yamakawa: Harp
- Motoya Hamaguchi: Percussion
- Ohno Group: Strings
- Takeru Muraoka: Tenor Saxophone
- Shigeharu Mukai, Tadanori Konakawa: Trombone
- Masahiro Kobayashi, Susumu Kazuhara: Trumpet

Guess I'm Dumb

- Tatsuro Yamashita: Acoustic Guitar, Electric Guitar, Acoustic Piano, Electric Grand Piano, Drums, Percussion, Vibraphone, Timpani, Backing Vocals
- Shunzo Sunahara: Baritone Saxophone
- Kohki Itoh: Bass
- Ohno Group: Strings
- Takeru Muraoka: Tenor Saxophone
- Shigeharu Mukai, Tadanori Konakawa: Trombone
- Masahiro Kobayashi, Susumu Kazuhara: Trumpet

Hitotoki (ひととき)

- Tatsuro Yamashita: Electric Guitar, Electric Piano, Percussion, Backing Vocals
- Kohki Itoh: Bass
- Jun Aoyama: Drums
- Motoya Hamaguchi: Percussion

Merry-Go-Round (メリー・ゴー・ラウンド)

- Tatsuro Yamashita: Electric Guitar, Celesta, Electric Piano, Percussion, Backing Vocals
- Kohki Itoh: Bass
- Jun Aoyama: Drums, Percussion
- Satoshi Nakamura: Oberheim OBX-a Synthesizer

Blue Midnight

- Tatsuro Yamashita: Electric Sitar, Vibraphone, Backing Vocals
- Hidefumi Toki: Alto Saxophone
- Akira Okazawa: Bass
- Yuichi Togashiki: Drums
- Tsunehide Matsuki: Electric Guitar
- Keiko Yamakawa: Harp
- Hiroshi Satoh: Acoustic Piano, Electric Piano
- Ohno Group - Strings

Ashioto (あしおと)

- Tatsuro Yamashita: Electric Guitar, Electric Piano, Percussion, Backing Vocals
- Kohki Itoh: Bass
- Jun Aoyama: Drums
- Hiroyuki Namba: Hammond Organ
- Motoya Hamaguchi: Percussion

Mokusou (黙想)

- Tatsuro Yamashita: Acoustic Piano, SFX, Backing Vocals

Christmas Eve (クリスマス・イブ)

- Tatsuro Yamashita: Electric Guitar, Percussion, Backing Vocals
- Kohki Itoh: Bass
- Jun Aoyama: Drums
- Hiroyuki Namba: Acoustic Piano, Electric Piano
- Satoshi Nakamura: Oberheim OBX-a Synthesizer

== Production ==
- Produced and arranged by Tatsuro Yamashita (for Smile Co.)
- Mixed and Remixed by Tamotsu Yoshida
- Associate producer: Nobumasa Uchida
- Assistant engineer: Masato Ohmori
- Recorded at CBS/Sony Roppongi Studio A & B
- Remixed at CBS/Sony Roppongi Studio B
- Mastering studio: CBS/Sony Shinanomachi Mastering Studio
- CD Mastering Engineer: Teppei Kasai
- Management office: Wild Honey
- Assistant management: Kentaro Hattori, Masayuki Matsumoto & Kimmy Satoh
- Copyright management: Kenichi Nomura
- Masterright Owned by Smile Co.
- Executive producer: Ryuzo "Junior" Kosugi
- Art direction: Hiroshi Takahara
- Design: Hiroshi Takahara, Akira Utsumi, Mayumi Oka
- Photographer: Kaoru Iijima
- Illustration for inner sleeve: Midori Murakami
- Lettering: Tadashi Yokoshi

== Chart positions ==
=== Weekly charts ===
Year	Country	Chart	Position	Sales
1983	Japan	Oricon Weekly LP Albums Chart (top 100)	1	367,000
1992	Japan	Oricon Weekly Albums Chart (top 100)	8	477,000

=== Year-end charts ===
Year	Country	Chart	Position	Sales
1983	Japan	Oricon Yearly Albums Chart (top 50)	7	515,000

== Awards ==
Japan Record Awards
Year	Title	Category	Winner
1983 (25th)	Melodies	Best 10 Albums	Tatsuro Yamashita

== Release history ==
Country	Date	Label	Format	Catalog number
Japan	June 8, 1983	Alfa/Moon	LP	MOON-28008
Japan	November 28, 1983	Alfa/Moon	CD	38XM1
Japan	December 21, 1986	Alfa/Moon	CD	32XM27
Japan	November 10, 1992	MMG/Moon	CD	AMCM-4150
Japan	June 2, 1999	Warner/Moon	CD	WPCV-10020

== See also ==
- 1983 in Japanese music
