= My Sugar Babe =

1980 single by Tatsurō Yamashita

Single by Tatsuro Yamashita

from the album Ride on Time
- B-side: "Daydream"
- Released: October 21, 1980
- Genre: Ballad; Rock; Pop
- Length: 4:09 (Side A)
- Label: AIR / RVC
- Songwriter: Tatsuro Yamashita
- Producer: Tatsuro Yamashita

Tatsuro Yamashita singles chronology
"Ride on Time" (1980)	"My Sugar Babe" (1980)	"Down Town" / "Paredo" (1982)

My Sugar Babe is the seventh single by Japanese singer-songwriter Tatsuro Yamashita, released on October 21, 1980.

== Overview ==
My Sugar Babe and the coupling song Daydream are both taken from the album Ride on Time by Tatsuro Yamashita.

According to Yamashita, "My Sugar Babe" is a song dedicated about Sugar Babe (hence the name of the song), a band that he partook in before starting his solo career. He had the vague desire to write a song like this for quite some time but when he started to work on the album "Ride on Time", he felt that now was the right time, so he wrote it. The song was used as a theme song for the Japanese detective drama series Keishi-K which aired on NTV. Additionally, an instrumental version from the drama was included in the bonus tracks of the remastered edition of "Ride on Time" and a short version was also included in the "Special Bonus Disc" of his 2002 compilation album The RCA/Air Years LP Box 1976-1982.

In 1994, Sugar Babe's album "Songs" containing the original mix was released for the first time in CD. Yamashita also held a live performance titled "TATSURO YAMASHITA Sings SUGAR BABE" on that same year in which My Sugar Babe was performed live as the last song of the performance.

Daydream is a song written by Minako Yoshida. Yamashita said that this was the best lyrics that she had ever written for him, and she is the only one who could have came up with the idea of creating lyrics from an acrylic color chart in order to clear a melody with a detailed musical arrangement that is difficult to translate into Japanese.

Tatsuro Yamashita is laid out on the front jacket, while Shintaro Katsu and the song's lyrics are laid out on the back of the jacket.

== Track listing ==
Side 1
No.	Title	Lyrics	Music	Length
1.	"My Sugar Babe"	Tatsuro Yamashita	Tatsuro Yamashita	4:09

Side 2
No.	Title	Lyrics	Music	Length
1.	"Daydream"	Minako Yoshida	Tatsuro Yamashita	4:27

== Personnel ==
=== My Sugar Babe ===
- Tatsuro Yamashita – Electric Guitar (Right), Glocken & Background Vocals
- Jun Aoyama – Drums
- Koki Ito – Bass
- Kazuo Shiina – Electric Guitar (Left)
- Toshiaki Usui – Acoustic Guitar
- Hiroyuki Namba – Keyboards
- Nobu Saito – Percussion

=== Daydream ===
- Tatsuro Yamashita – Electric Guitar (Right), Percussion & Background Vocals
- Jun Aoyama – Drums
- Koki Ito – Bass
- Kazuo Shiina – Electric Guitar (Left)
- Hiroyuki Namba – Keyboards
- Nobu Saito – Percussion
- Shin Kazuhara – Trumpet
- Yoshihiro Nakagawa – Trumpet
- Shigeharu Mukai – Trombone (Solo)
- Tadanori Konakawa – Trombone
- Takeru Muraoka – Tenor Sax
- Shunzo Sunahara – Baritone Sax

== Chart positions ==
Year	Single	Chart	Position	Sales
1980	My Sugar Babe	Oricon Weekly Singles Chart	90	4,000

== See also ==
- 1980 in Japanese music
