= Moonglow (Tatsuro Yamashita album) =

Studio album by Tatsuro Yamashita
- Released: October 21, 1979
- Studio: • Canyon Studio^{(ja)} • Onkio Haus • Media Studio • Sound City Studio • RCA Studio
- Genre: City pop; Jazz; Funk; Soul; Pop; Disco; Jazz rock
- Length: 46:31; 58:45 (2002 reissue)
- Label: AIR/RVC; AIR/BMG Funhouse (2002 reissue)
- Producer: Tatsuro Yamashita, Ryuzo Kosugi

Tatsuro Yamashita chronology
Go Ahead! (1978)	Moonglow (1979)	Ride on Time (1980)

Singles from Moonglow
- 1. "Let's Kiss The Sun" Released: April 5, 1979; 2. "永遠のFull Moon" Released: October 21, 1979

Moonglow is the fourth studio album by Japanese singer-songwriter Tatsuro Yamashita, released in October 1979.

This was his first LP under the AIR label and was also the first studio album released by AIR.

== Overview ==
Moonglow was one of Tatsuro Yamashita's studio albums that stayed the most weeks in the Oricon charts, staying in for fifty weeks. Most of the songs included in this album were written by Minako Yoshida and composed by Tatsuro Yamashita.

Before the album came out, "Let's Kiss The Sun" was released as a lead single. The song was used as a commercial song for Japan Airlines Okinawa campaign.

At this time, Yamashita's director Ryuzo Kosugi launched an independent label "AIR" within the RVC he belonged to because of his desire to take a more free production stance without being controlled by the company's restrictions. This work "Moonglow" was released in the fall of 1979 as the first new record of this new label AIR. It became a stepping stone to the next work "Ride on Time".

When the album finally came out, "Eien no Full Moon" (永遠のFull Moon) was released as a single at the same time as the album. Its B-side would include the song "Funky Flushin'" which was also included on the Moonglow album. Though both of the singles failed to enter the Oricon Singles Chart.

In 1980, the album would win in the 22nd Japan Record Awards for "Best Album Award".

== 2002 remastered edition ==
In 2002, a remastered reissue (BVCR-17016) was released as part of The RCA/AIR Years 1976–1982 series. The reissue would include three additional tracks that were previously unreleased before. It would enter the Oricon charts, peaking in at twenty-six for two weeks.

== Track listing ==
All lyrics are written by Minako Yoshida, except where noted; all music is composed by Tatsuro Yamashita

Side A
No.	Title	Lyrics	Length
1.	"夜の翼 (Nightwing)" (Yoru no Tsubasa)	Tatsuro Yamashita	1:30
2.	"永遠のFull Moon" (Eien no Full Moon)		4:25
3.	"Rainy Walk"		5:08
4.	"Storm"		6:22
5.	"Funky Flushin'"		5:40
Total length:			23:05

Side B
No.	Title	Lyrics	Length
1.	"Hot Shot"		5:55
2.	"Touch Me Lightly"	Chris Mosdell	4:23
3.	"Sunshine (愛の金色)" (Ai no Kin'iro)		4:20
4.	"Yellow Cab"		4:48
5.	"愛を描いて (Let's Kiss The Sun)" (Ai wo Egaite)		4:00
Total length:			23:26

=== 2002 remastered edition ===
No.	Title	Lyrics	Length
1.	"夜の翼"	Tatsuro Yamashita	1:30
2.	"永遠のFull Moon"		4:27
3.	"Rainy Walk"		5:09
4.	"Storm"		6:24
5.	"Funky Flushin'"		5:43
6.	"Hot Shot"		5:53
7.	"Touch Me Lightly"	Chris Mosdell	4:24
8.	"Sunshine (愛の金色)"		4:21
9.	"Yellow Cab"		4:49
10.	"愛を描いて (Let's Kiss The Sun)"		4:04
11.	"夜の翼 (Karaoke)" (Previously Unreleased)	N/A	1:39
12.	"永遠のFull Moon (Live Version)" (Previously Unreleased)		5:14
13.	"Funky Flushin' (Alternate Version)"		5:08
Total length:			58:45

== Personnel ==
"Taken from the inner sleeve notes of the 1979 album (AIR-8001)."

=== Musicians ===
==== Drums ====
- Yutaka Uehara (A-2, 5, B-1, 3, 4, 5)
- Shuichi "Ponta" Murakami (A-4, B-2)
- Yukihiro Takahashi (A-3)
- Tatsuro Yamashita – Syndrum (A-2, B-5)

==== Bass ====
- Akihiro Tanaka (A-2, 5, B-1, 3, 4, 5)
- Akira Okazawa (A-4, B-2)
- Haruomi Hosono (A-3) by the courtesy of ALFA RECORDS

==== Guitars ====
- Kazuo Shiina (A-2, 5, B-1, 3, 4, 5), solo (A-5, B-1)
- Tsunehide Matsuki (A-4, B-2), solo (A-4)
- Masaki Matsubara (A-3)
- Tatsuro Yamashita (A-2, 5, B-1, 3, 4, 5), solo (B-4)

==== Keyboards ====
- Hiroyuki Nanba – acoustic piano (A-2, 5, B-3, 5), electric piano (A-2, B-1, 3, 4, 5), Minimoog solo (B-3)
- Hiroshi Satoh – electric piano (A-3, 4, B-2) by the courtesy of KITTY RECORDS
- Tatsuro Yamashita – synth strings (B-1)
- Ryuichi Sakamoto – Korg PS-3100 synthesizer (B-4)

==== Percussion ====
- Nov Saitoh (A-5, B-3)
- Pecker (A-2, 3)
- Tatsuro Yamashita – glockenspiel (A-2), vibraphone (A-4), other (A-1, 3, B-1, 2, 3, 4, 5)

==== Background Vocals ====
- Minako Yoshida (A-2, 5, B-1, 3, 4, 5) by the courtesy of ALFA RECORDS
- Tatsuro Yamashita (all tracks)
- Kazuo Shiina (B-4)
- Hiroyuki Namba (B-4)

==== Other Instruments ====
- Trumpet — Shin Kazuhara, Yoshikazu Kishi (A-2, 3, 5, B-5)
- Trombone — Shigeharu Mukai, Tadanori Konakawa (A-2, 3, 5, B-5)
- Tenor Sax — Kazuo Suzuki (A-2, 3, 5, B-5)
- Alto Sax – Hidefumi Toki (solo on A-2, 4, B-2)
- Baritone Sax — Shunzo Sunahara (A-2, 3, 5, B-5)
- Strings Concert Master — Tadaaki Ohno (A-2, 3, 4)
- Conductor — Koji Haijima
- Harp — Keiko Yamakawa (A-4, B-2)

== Chart positions ==
Year	Album	Country	Chart	Position	Sales
1979	Moonglow	Japan	Oricon Weekly LP Albums Chart (top 100)	20	146,000
1979	Moonglow	Japan	Oricon Weekly CT Albums Chart (top 100)	33	45,000
2002	Moonglow [Remastered edition]	Japan	Oricon Weekly Albums Chart	26	13,000

== Awards ==
22nd Japan Record Awards
Date	Title	Category	Winner
December 31, 1980	Moonglow	Best Album Award	Tatsuro Yamashita

== Release history ==
Country	Date	Label	Format	Catalog number
Japan	October 21, 1979	AIR/RVC	LP	AIR-8001
Japan	October 21, 1979	AIR/RVC	CT	ART-8001
Japan	June 21, 1984	AIR/RVC	CD	RACD-8
Japan	August 15, 1986	AIR/RVC	CD	R32A-1018
Japan	March 15, 1987	AIR/RVC	CD	R28H-2804
Japan	August 21, 1990	RCA/BMG Victor	CD	BVCR-7004
Japan	September 21, 1990	RCA/BMG Victor	CD	BVCR-2502
Japan	June 4, 1997	RCA/BMG Japan	CD	BVCR-1031
Japan	May 21, 1999	RCA/BMG Japan	CD	BVCK-37009
Japan	February 14, 2002	RCA/BMG Funhouse	CD	BVCR-17016
Japan	February 20, 2002	RCA/BMG Funhouse	LP	BVJR-17006

== See also ==
- 1979 in Japanese music
