= Big Wave (Tatsuro Yamashita album) =

Soundtrack album by Tatsuro Yamashita
- Released: June 20, 1984
- Studio: CBS/Sony Roppongi Studio; Onkio Haus; Alfa Studio
- Genre: City pop; rock and roll; pop; soft rock
- Length: 40:07
- Label: Alfa
- Producer: Tatsuro Yamashita

Tatsuro Yamashita chronology
Melodies (1983)	Big Wave (1984)	Pocket Music (1986)

Singles from Big Wave
- 1. "The Theme from Big Wave" Released: May 25, 1984

Big Wave is the soundtrack album for the motion picture of the same name, produced and recorded by Japanese singer-songwriter Tatsuro Yamashita. It was released in June 1984 and peaked at No.2 on the Oricon Albums Chart for a 19-week stay. The album was heavily influenced by the songwriting and production of Brian Wilson. Its first half consists of original songs, with English lyrics by Alan O'Day, while the second is mostly cover versions of Beach Boys songs.

== Background ==
The film, directed by Walter McConnelly and released May 25, 1984, features big wave surfers Mark Richards, Michael Ho, Tommy Carroll, Sam George, Rabbit Bartholomew, Peter Townend, Cheyne Horan, Willie Morris, Martin Potter, and others riding huge waves on the North Shore of Oahu and Maui. In addition, other summer sports such as windsurfing with Richard White and Matt Schweitzer, water skiing, and roller skating are featured. The film Big Wave was released on DVD by Pony Canyon (PCBH-50151) on May 27, 2005.

The A-side of Big Wave is composed of the songs Tatsuro Yamashita wrote, and the rest of the album consists mostly of cover versions of compositions of the Beach Boys' frontman Brian Wilson. The song "The Theme from Big Wave" was first aired on the NHK-FM radio program hosted by Yamashita in January 1983 as "Mahou wo Oshiete" (魔法を教えて; "Teach Me Magic"). It features his former bandmate Taeko Onuki on lead vocals, and its lyrics were written in Japanese by her. As the title indicated, he remade the song as the theme for the film.

The English-language lyrics for the Big Wave project were written by Alan O'Day. Yamashita learned them phonetically as he does not speak English. A slight mispronounciation can be heard during "Please Let Me Wonder", as Yamashita sings "You'll never know what we'll been through" instead of "we've been through."

O'Day worked with him for the first time on Mariya Takeuchi's Miss.M album released in 1980. "Your Eyes" had earlier appeared with Japanese lyrics on Yamashita's 1982 album For You, as had "Jody" on 1983's Melodies. "I Love You" was featured on Suntory's TV advertising aired from 1983 for about three years. Except instrumental version of "I Love You" and "Girls on the Beach", most songs included on the B-Side of the soundtrack were previously issued on his albums or flip side for singles, although some of them remixed or additionally recorded.

Big Wave peaked at #2 on the Japanese Oricon and sold over 450,000 copies while it was staying on the chart, becoming one of the most commercially successful soundtrack albums in Japan at the time.

== Track listing ==
Side one
No.	Title	Writer(s)	Length
1.	"The Theme from Big Wave"	Tatsuro Yamashita; Alan O'Day	3:40
2.	"Jody"	Tatsuro Yamashita; Alan O'Day	3:51
3.	"Only with You"	Tatsuro Yamashita; Alan O'Day	3:43
4.	"Magic Ways"	Tatsuro Yamashita; Alan O'Day	4:49
5.	"Your Eyes"	Tatsuro Yamashita; Alan O'Day	3:14
6.	"I Love You... (Part II)"	Tatsuro Yamashita; Alan O'Day	2:06

Side two
No.	Title	Writer(s)	Length
7.	"Girls on the Beach"	Brian Wilson; Mike Love	2:45
8.	"Please Let Me Wonder"	Brian Wilson; Mike Love	3:09
9.	"Darlin'"	Brian Wilson; Mike Love	3:29
10.	"Guess I'm Dumb"	Brian Wilson; Russ Titelman	3:15
11.	"This Could Be the Night"	Harry Nilsson	4:03
12.	"I Love You... (Part I)"	Tatsuro Yamashita	2:08
Total length:			40:07

== 30th anniversary editions ==
On July 23, 2014, the 30th Anniversary Edition of Big Wave was released by Warner Music Japan on CD (digital) (ASIN: B00JYR5INO EAN: 4943674181339). Seven additional tracks were added:

1. "Breakdance" [previously unreleased]
2. "I Love You" [previously unreleased acapella 120 sec. version]
3. "Only With You" [guitar instrumental]
4. "This Could Be The Night" [previously unreleased alternate mix]
5. "Please Let Me Wonder" [previously unreleased karaoke]
6. "Only With You" [previously unreleased karaoke]
7. "I Love You" [previously unreleased acapella 30 sec. version]

On August 20, 2014, the 30th Anniversary Limited Edition of Big Wave was released by Warner Music Japan on 180g LP (analog) (ASIN: B00L6RRX2E EAN： 4943674181353). The two disc set has twelve tracks:

Side one

1. "The Theme From Big Wave"
2. "Jody"
3. "Only With You"

Side two

1. "Magic Ways"
2. "Your Eyes"
3. "I Love You... (Part II)"

Side three

1. "Girls On The Beach"
2. "Please Let Me Wonder"
3. "Darlin'"

Side four

1. "Guess I'm Dumb"
2. "This Could Be The Night"
3. "I Love You... (Part I)"

== Chart positions ==
=== Weekly charts ===
Year	Country	Chart	Position	Sales
1984	Japan	Oricon Weekly LP Albums Chart (top 100)	2	454,000
1984	Japan	Oricon Weekly CT Albums Chart (top 100)	2	454,000

=== Year-end charts ===
Year	Country	Chart	Position	Sales
1984	Japan	Oricon Yearly Albums Chart (top 50)	15	454,000

== See also ==
- 1984 in Japanese music
