= Season's Greetings (album) =

Studio album by Tatsuro Yamashita
- Released: November 18, 1993; August 28, 2013 (20th Anniversary Expanded Edition)
- Studio: Abbey Road Studios
- Genre: City pop; christmas music
- Length: 38:51; 54:28 (2013 remaster)
- Label: MMG; Moon

Tatsuro Yamashita chronology
Artisan (1991)	Season's Greetings (1993)	Treasures (1995)

Season's Greetings is a cover album by Tatsurō Yamashita, released in November 1993. It is sort of a holiday album, though some of the songs have nothing to do with Christmas or the winter season.

Season's Greetings features an English version of his signature song "Christmas Eve". The remake version, that has lyrics written by Alan O'Day, was included on several reissues of the CD single of the song in later years.

== Track listing ==
1. "Acappella Variation on a Theme by Gluck" (Christoph Willibald Gluck) - 0:49
2. "Bella Notte" (Peggy Lee, Sonny Burke) - 3:50
3. "Be My Love" (Nicholas Brodzsky, Sammy Cahn) - 3:40
4. "Angels We Have Heard on High" (traditional) - 1:00
5. "Smoke Gets in Your Eyes" (Otto Harbach, Jerome Kern) - 3:08
6. "Silent Night" (Franz Gruber, Josef Mohr) - 1:09
7. "My Gift to You" (James Harris III, Terry Lewis) - 4:05
8. "It's All in the Game" (Carl Sigman, Charles G. Dawes) - 3:23
9. "Just a Lonely Christmas" (Harvey Fuqua, Alan Freed) - 2:24
10. "Happy Holiday" (Bob Staunton) - 2:20
11. "Blue Christmas" (Billy Hayes, Jay W. Johnson) - 2:46
12. "White Christmas" (Irving Berlin) - 2:23
13. "Christmas Eve" [English Version] (Tatsuro Yamashita, Alan O'Day) - 4:13
14. "Have Yourself a Merry Little Christmas" (Hugh Martin, Ralph Blane) - 2:48
15. "O Come All Ye Faithful" (John Francis Wade) - 0:53

Bonus tracks (2013 Remaster)

16. "White Christmas" (Happy Xmas Show! version) (Berlin) - 2:26
17. "We Wish You a Merry Christmas" (traditional) - 0:47
18. "Jingle Bell Rock" (Live version) (Joe Beal, Jim Boothe) - 2:24
19. "O Little One Sweet" - 0:49
20. "Jingle Bell Rock" (Happy Xmas Show! version) (Beal, Boothe) - 2:21
21. "It's All in the Game" (Live version) (Sigman, Dawes)- 5:36
22. "Joy to the World" - 0:37

== Charts ==
=== Weekly charts ===
Chart (1993)	Position
Japanese Oricon Albums Chart	4
Chart (2013)	Position
Japanese Oricon Albums Chart	11

=== Year-end charts ===
Chart (1994)	Position
Japanese Albums Chart	54

=== Certifications ===
Region	Certification	Certified units/sales
Japan (RIAJ)	Platinum	392,000
