= Rarities (Tatsuro Yamashita album) =

Greatest hits album by Tatsuro Yamashita
- Released: October 30, 2002
- Genre: Japanese pop
- Length: 71:18
- Label: Warner Music Japan/Moon Records

Tatsuro Yamashita chronology
On the Street Corner 3 (1999)	Rarities (2002)	Sonorite (2005)

Rarities is the compilation album by a Japanese singer-songwriter Tatsuro Yamashita, released in October 2002. The album is mainly composed of the songs which had initially appeared on B-sides of his previous singles and not included on any albums.

== Track listing ==
Side one
No.	Title	Writer(s)	Length
1.	"Blow"	Tatsurō Yamashita	4:34
2.	"Kimi no Koe ni Koi Shiteru (君の声に恋してる)"	Yamashita	5:05
3.	"Love Goes On -Sono Hitomi wa Goddess- (LOVE GOES ON -その瞳は女神-)"	Yamashita	5:05
4.	"Happy Happy Greeting" (Original demo version)	Yamashita, Takashi Matsumoto	6:16
5.	"Misty Mauve"	Yamashita, Mariya Takeuchi	4:48
6.	"To Wait for Love"	Burt Bacharach, Hal David	3:28
7.	"Su Ki Su Ki Sweet Kiss! (好・き・好・き SWEET KISS!)"	Yamashita	4:14
8.	"Shiosai (潮騒)" (Live version)	Yamashita, Minako Yoshida	5:09
9.	"Morning Shine (モーニング・シャイン)"	Yamashita	4:22
10.	"First Luck (Hajimete no Shiawase (初めての幸運))"	Yamashita, Chinfa Kan	4:48
11.	"I Do" (Remix)	Brian Wilson	2:27
12.	"Heron (ヘロン)" (Guitar instrumental version)	Yamashita	4:26
13.	"Juvenile no Theme (Hitomi no Naka no Rainbow) (JUVENILEのテーマ～瞳の中のRAINBOW)"	Yamashita	4:55
14.	"Sprinkler (スプリンクラー)" (Long version)	Yamashita	7:13
15.	"Itsuka Hareta Hi ni (いつか晴れた日に)" (Stand Alone version)	Yamashita, Matsumoto	4:23

== Charts and certifications ==
=== Weekly charts ===
Chart (2002)	Position
Japanese Oricon Albums Chart	1

=== Year-end charts ===
Chart (2002)	Position
Japanese Albums Chart	99

=== Certifications ===
Region	Certification	Certified units/sales
Japan (RIAJ)	Gold	258,000
