= Ride on Time (album) =

Studio album by Tatsuro Yamashita
- Released: September 19, 1980
- Studio: CBS/Sony
- Genre: City pop; J-pop; funk; disco; R&B; soul
- Length: 43:19; 53:29 (2002 reissue)
- Label: AIR; RVC
- Producer: Tatsuro Yamashita

Tatsuro Yamashita chronology
Moonglow (1979)	Ride on Time (1980)	On the Street Corner (1980)

Singles from Ride on Time
- 1. "Ride on Time" Released: May 1, 1980; 2. "My Sugar Babe" Released: October 21, 1980

Alternative cover
- The obi of the first release of the album

Ride on Time is the fifth studio album by Japanese singer-songwriter Tatsuro Yamashita, released by AIR/RVC on September 19, 1980. It is best known for its title track, which was used in the television commercial for Maxell cassette tapes starring Yamashita, and released as a single in May 1980. The song became his first charting single, peaking at No. 3 on Oricon's weekly singles chart with sales of 417,000 copies. In 2003, the song was featured on the television drama Good Luck!! starring Takuya Kimura, and entered the top 20 on the chart again.

The album was released after the title track became a hit, and gained commercial success subsequently. It topped the Oricon weekly albums chart for a week in October 1980, selling more than 220,000 units.

Following the album's release, the song "My Sugar Babe" (ode to the band he formerly fronted) was issued as a single. It was featured as a theme song for the television drama Keishi-K starring and directed by Shintaro Katsu and aired on NTV in Autumn 1980. Yamashita composed the entire background music used on the TV series. The album's 2002 remastered edition includes three tracks from the soundtrack as bonus tracks.

== Track listing ==
All lyrics are written by Minako Yoshida, except where indicated; all music is composed by Tatsuro Yamashita.

Side A
No.	Title	Lyrics	Length
1.	"Someday" (Itsuka (いつか))		5:49
2.	"Daydream"		4:31
3.	"Silent Screamer"		5:29
4.	"Ride on Time" (Album Version)	Yamashita	5:55

Side B
No.	Title	Lyrics	Length
1.	"The Door into Summer" (Natsu e no Tobira (夏への扉))		4:41
2.	"My Sugar Babe"	Yamashita	4:11
3.	"Rainy Day"		5:20
4.	"Clouds" (Kumo no Yukue ni (雲のゆくえに; "Where the Clouds Are"))		5:40
5.	"Kissing Goodnight" (Oyasumi (おやすみ))	Yamashita	1:41

2002 remastered edition bonus tracks
No.	Title	Lyrics	Length
10.	"Ride on Time" (Single Version)	Yamashita	4:25
11.	"Interlude I" (Instrumental)		0:56
12.	"Interlude II" (Instrumental)		1:31
13.	"My Sugar Babe" (Instrumental)		3:21

== Personnel ==
Recording members

=== Someday ===
- Tatsuro Yamashita – Electric Guitar (Right), Glocken, Percussion & Background Vocals
- Jun Aoyama – Drums
- Koki Ito – Bass
- Kazuo Shiina – Electric Guitar (Left) & Guitar Synthesizer
- Hiroyuki Namba – Keyboards
- Minako Yoshida – Background Vocals
- Shin Kazuhara – Trumpet
- Yoshihiro Nakagawa – Trumpet
- Shigeharu Mukai – Trombone
- Tadanori Konakawa – Trombone
- Takeru Muraoka – Tenor Sax
- Shunzo Sunahara – Baritone Sax

=== Daydream ===
- Tatsuro Yamashita – Electric Guitar (Right), Percussion & Background Vocals
- Jun Aoyama – Drums
- Koki Ito – Bass
- Kazuo Shiina – Electric Guitar (Left)
- Hiroyuki Namba – Keyboards
- Nobu Saito – Percussion
- Shin Kazuhara – Trumpet
- Yoshihiro Nakagawa – Trumpet
- Shigeharu Mukai – Trombone
- Tadanori Konakawa – Trombone
- Takeru Muraoka – Tenor Sax
- Shunzo Sunahara – Baritone Sax

=== Silent Screamer ===
- Tatsuro Yamashita – Electric Guitar (Right), Percussion & Background Vocals
- Jun Aoyama – Drums
- Koki Ito – Bass
- Kazuo Shiina – Electric Guitar (Left)
- Hiroyuki Namba – Keyboards
- Nobu Saito – Percussion
- Minako Yoshida – Background Vocals

=== Ride on Time ===
- Tatsuro Yamashita – Electric Guitar (Right), Percussion & Background Vocals
- Jun Aoyama – Drums
- Koki Ito – Bass
- Kazuo Shiina – Electric Guitar (Left)
- Hiroyuki Namba – Keyboards
- Hidefumi Toki – Alto Sax Solo
- Minako Yoshida – Background Vocals
- Shin Kazuhara – Trumpet
- Yoshihiro Nakagawa – Trumpet
- Shigeharu Mukai – Trombone
- Tadanori Konakawa – Trombone
- Takeru Muraoka – Tenor Sax
- Shunzo Sunahara – Baritone Sax

=== The Door into Summer ===
- Tatsuro Yamashita – Electric Guitar (Right), Clavinet, Percussion & Background Vocals
- Jun Aoyama – Drums
- Koki Ito – Bass
- Kazuo Shiina – Electric Guitar (Left)
- Hiroyuki Namba – Keyboards
- Kenji Nakazawa – Flugelhorn Solo
- Minako Yoshida – Background Vocals

=== My Sugar Babe ===
- Tatsuro Yamashita – Electric Guitar (Right), Glocken & Background Vocals
- Jun Aoyama – Drums
- Koki Ito – Bass
- Kazuo Shiina – Electric Guitar (Left)
- Toshiaki Usui – Acoustic Guitar
- Hiroyuki Namba – Keyboards
- Nobu Saito – Percussion

=== Rainy Day ===
- Tatsuro Yamashita – Electric Guitar (Right), Electric Sitar, Percussion & Background Vocals
- Jun Aoyama – Drums
- Koki Ito – Bass
- Kazuo Shiina – Electric Guitar (Left)
- Hiroshi Sato – Keyboards

=== Clouds ===
- Tatsuro Yamashita – Electric Guitar (Right), Korg Lambda Strings, Percussion & Background Vocals
- Jun Aoyama – Drums
- Koki Ito – Bass
- Kazuo Shiina – Electric Guitar (Left)
- Hiroshi Sato – Keyboards
- Nobu Saito – Percussion
- Hidefumi Toki – Alto Sax

=== Kissing Goodnight ===
- Tatsuro Yamashita – Acoustic Piano, Minimoog & Background Vocals
- Hiroyuki Namba – Korg PS-3100 Synthesizer

=== Ride on Time [Single version] ===
- Tatsuro Yamashita Electric Guitar (Right), Kalimba, Percussion & Background Vocals
- Jun Aoyama – Drums
- Koki Ito – Bass
- Kazuo Shiina – Electric Guitar (Left)
- Hiroyuki Namba – Keyboards
- Hidefumi Toki – Alto Sax Solo
- Minako Yoshida – Background Vocals
- Shin Kazuhara – Trumpet
- Yoshikazu Kishi – Trumpet
- Shigeharu Mukai – Trombone
- Tadanori Konakawa – Trombone
- Takeru Muraoka – Tenor Sax
- Shunzo Sunahara – Baritone Sax

=== Interlude I & II ===
- Tatsuro Yamashita – Electric Guitar (Right)
- Jun Aoyama – Drums
- Koki Ito – Bass
- Kazuo Shiina – Electric Guitar (Left)
- Hiroyuki Namba – Keyboards

=== My Sugar Babe [Instrumental] ===
- Tatsuro Yamashita – Electric Guitar (Left)
- Jun Aoyama – Drums
- Koki Ito – Bass
- Kazuo Shiina – Electric Guitar (Right)
- Hiroyuki Namba – Keyboards

== Chart positions ==
=== Weekly charts ===
Year	Album	Country	Chart	Position	Sales
1980–81	Ride on Time	Japan	Oricon Weekly LP Albums Chart (top 100)	1	225,000
1980–81	Ride on Time	Japan	Oricon Weekly CT Albums Chart (top 100)	4	225,000
2002–03	Ride on Time [Expanded remaster]	Japan	Oricon Weekly Albums Chart (top 300)	20	42,000

=== Year-end charts ===
Year	Album	Country	Chart	Position	Sales
1980	Ride on Time	Japan	Oricon Yearly Albums Chart (top 50)	39	184,000

== Release history ==
Country	Date	Label	Format	Catalog number
Japan	September 19, 1980	AIR/RVC	LP	RAL-8501
Japan	September 19, 1980	AIR/RVC	CT	RAT-8501
Japan	November 21, 1984	AIR/RVC	CD	RACD-16
Japan	August 15, 1986	AIR/RVC	CD	R32A-1019
Japan	March 15, 1987	AIR/RVC	CD	R28H-2805
Japan	August 21, 1990	RCA/BMG Victor	CD	BVCR-7005
Japan	September 21, 1990	RCA/BMG Victor	CD	BVCR-2503
Japan	June 4, 1997	RCA/BMG Japan	CD	BVCR-1032
Japan	May 21, 1999	RCA/BMG Japan	CD	BVCK-37010
Japan	February 14, 2002	RCA/BMG Funhouse	CD	BVCR-17017
Japan	February 20, 2002	RCA/BMG Funhouse	LP	BVJR-17007

== See also ==
- 1980 in Japanese music
