= On the Street Corner =

On The Street Corner

Studio album by Tatsuro Yamashita
- Released: December 19, 1980
- Studio: CBS/Sony
- Genre: A cappella; doo-wop
- Length: 43:19; 53:29 (2002 reissue)
- Language: English
- Label: AIR; RVC
- Producer: Tatsuro Yamashita

Tatsuro Yamashita chronology
Ride on Time (1980)	On The Street Corner (1980)	For You (1982)

On the Street Corner is a 1980 cover album by Tatsuro Yamashita. The album features Tatsuro Yamashita's favorite oldies, especially doo-wop songs. Many of the takes recorded were initially performed purely as Yamashita's hobby, and while some of them were shown on stage, the number of songs gradually accumulated, so that's it. So it was put together as an album. Therefore, while some are close to the original copy, some are quite different from the original image. Terms such as "a cappella," "doo-wop," and "single-person multiple chorus" were first widely disseminated in Japan on this album. He commented on this work, saying that he's been waiting to do an album like this when "Ride on Time" came on the first place. He stated that he wanted to do doo-wop music, and commented that the album is a kind of confirmation or holding down to close the gap between fans.

== Re-releases ==
In 1986, the album was officially reissued as "On the street corner 1 ('86 version)" with all the songs remixed and the main vocals re-recorded. In 2000, the album was digitally remastered with two bonus tracks and reissued as "On the street corner 1".

== Track listing ==
=== Side one ===
1. "You Belong to Me" (Chilton Price, Pee Wee King, Redd Stewart) – 2:54
2. "Close Your Eyes" (Chuck Willis), with the voice of Yoshida Minako – 3:29.
3. "Spanish Harlem" (Jerry Leiber, Phil Spector) – 2:42
4. "Alone" (Morty Kraft, Selma Kraft) – 2:30
5. "Most of All" (Alan Freed, Harvey Fuqua) – 3:19

=== Side two ===
1. "Remember Me Baby" (Barry Mann, Cynthia Weil) – 2:56
2. "Blue Velvet" (Bernie Wayne, Lee Morris) – 2:32
3. "The Wind" (Nolan Strong, Quentin Eubanks, Juan Guieterriez, Willie Hunter, Bob "Chico" Edwards) – 2:10
4. "Drip Drop" (Jerry Leiber, Mike Stoller) – 3:15
5. "That's My Desire" (Helmy Kresa, Carroll Loveday) – 3:46

== Track listing (2000 expanded and remastered reissue) ==
1. "You Belong to Me" (Price, King, Stewart)
2. "Close Your Eyes" (Willis)
3. "Spanish Harlem" (Leiber, Spector)
4. "Alone" (M. Kraft, S. Kraft)
5. "Most of All" (Freed, Fuqua)
6. "Gee" (William Davis, Morris Levy)
7. "Close Your Eyes" -All Tatsuro Version- (Willis)
8. "Remember Me Baby" (Mann, Weil)
9. "Blue Velvet" (Wayne, Morris)
10. "The Wind" (Strong, Eubanks, Guieterriez, Hunter, Edwards)
11. "Drip Drop" (Leiber, Stoller)
12. "That's My Desire" (Kresa, Loveday)

== Chart positions ==
Year	Country	Chart	Position	Sales
1980	Japan	Oricon Weekly LP Albums Chart (top 100)	13	88,000
1980	Japan	Oricon Weekly CT Albums Chart (top 100)	46	88,000
1986	Japan	Oricon Weekly CD Albums Chart (top 100)	5	95,000
1986	Japan	Oricon Weekly LP Albums Chart (top 100)	16	95,000
1986	Japan	Oricon Weekly CT Albums Chart (top 100)	22	95,000
2000	Japan	Oricon Weekly Albums Chart (top 100)	18	40,000

== See also ==
- 1980 in Japanese music
