= Tatsuro Yamashita =

Japanese musician (b. 1953)

Tatsurō Yamashita
- 山下 達郎
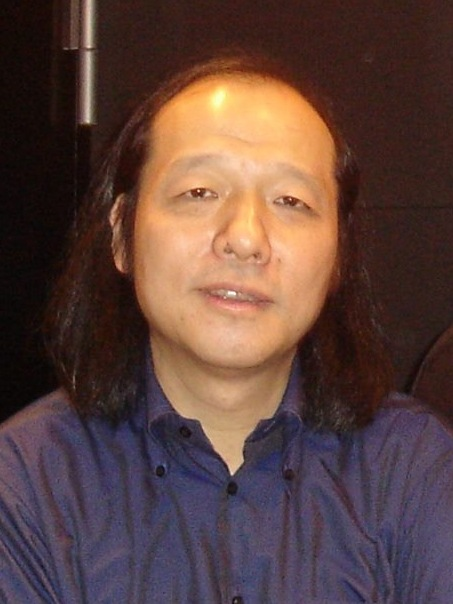
- Yamashita in 2005
- Born: Tatsurō Yamashita (山下 達郎); February 4, 1953 (age 73); Ikebukuro, Toshima, Tokyo, Japan
- Occupations: Singer-songwriter, record producer
- Years active: 1975–present
- Spouse: Mariya Takeuchi (m. 1982)
- Children: 1
- Musical career
- Genres: J-POP; pop rock; soft rock; Jazz fusion; R&B; soul; City pop
- Instruments: Vocals, guitars, piano, keyboards, drums, percussion
- Labels: AIR, Moon, Niagara, RCA, RVC, Warner Music Japan, EastWest Japan, MMG
- Website: tatsuro.co.jp

Tatsurō Yamashita (山下 達郎, Yamashita Tatsurō; born February 4, 1953), occasionally referred to as Tatsu Yamashita or Tats Yamashita, is a Japanese singer-songwriter and record producer, whose music in the early 1980s is now widely regarded as a cornerstone of city pop.

His most well-known song is "Christmas Eve", a best-selling song released in Japan in the 1980s. It has appeared on the Japanese charts for over 35 consecutive years.

He is known for his collaborations with his wife Mariya Takeuchi on many songs, including "Plastic Love", and the American songwriter Alan O'Day, with whom he co-wrote the songs "Your Eyes", "Magic Ways", "Love Can Go the Distance", and "Fragile". In the overseas City Pop revival that began in the 2010s, he has frequently been called the "King of City Pop".

Yamashita is considered a major contributor to Japanese music and is ranked by HMV Japan as the sixth among the top 100 Japanese Artists.

== Career ==
Yamashita was a member of the band Sugar Babe with musicians Taeko Onuki and Kunio Muramatsu, who released their only album Songs in 1975. After the group disbanded in 1976, Yamashita signed to RCA and launched his solo career, releasing the album Circus Town the same year. In 1976, he teamed up with Eiichi Ohtaki, the producer of Sugar Babe, and Sugar Babe member Ginji Ito to release Niagara Triangle Vol. 1 which was cited by MTV as one of the finest collaborative efforts of that period. His 1979 award-winning album Moonglow gained only moderate success, but his 1980 song Ride on Time reached No. 3 on the Japanese Oricon chart and the album of the same name topped the chart subsequently, propelling him to stardom.

Tatsuro's music has been regarded as a symbol of Japanese city pop, as represented by Ride on Time and For You in the early 1980s.

In 2011, Yamashita's newly-released album Ray of Hope topped the weekly Oricon Albums Chart, making him the fourth singer to have topped the chart at least once per decade for four decades running.

He has been called a "sound craftsman" because of his commitment to music-making and sound quality. A multi-faceted musician, some of his songs are recorded entirely by himself, including vocal backup, guitar arrangement, synthesizer, and percussion. His music is heavily acoustic, but also demonstrates a wide range of knowledge about analog and digital recording, and recent developments in musical production technology, including computer programming.

"Christmas Eve", one of Yamashita's best-known songs in Japan and the best-selling Japanese single of the 1980s, first appeared on his 1983 album Melodies. It topped the charts in 1990 and has since ranked in the top 100 on the Japanese charts every Christmas season. It has sold nearly 2 million copies since its release and continues to be sold in small quantities as a limited edition every Christmas season. The song has become iconic due to its use in JR Central's "Xmas Express" commercials; new ads are shot every year with different actors and often at different stations, all showing a couple reuniting in time for the holidays thanks to the Tokaido Shinkansen's reliability and punctuality, usually with the boyfriend disembarking with the girlfriend preparing to surprise him. JR selected "Christmas Eve" from a pool of 300 songs to serve as the theme song. The English-version of the song, with lyrics by Alan O'Day, was also recorded by Yamashita and has been covered by artists such as Pentatonix, the Commodores, All-4-One, and Idina Menzel.

Despite often singing in English, Yamashita does not actually speak the language. He learns his English lyrics phonetically.

As a solo artist, Yamashita has released 13 original studio albums, five cover albums, two live albums, multiple compilations, and over 50 singles. He is the most commercially successful Japanese male solo recording artist in the history of the Japanese album chart, selling approximately 9 million albums in total. He has also composed for films and television commercials, and worked on records by other artists. Yamashita frequently collaborated with Alan O'Day, who wrote the English lyrics for some of his most popular songs, such as “Christmas Eve”. He also partnered with a Hawaiian band called Greenwood, with their biggest hit being their cover of "Sparkle".

== Personal life ==
Little is known about Yamashita's life outside of the music industry. His wife is Mariya Takeuchi, whom he married in 1982. They have one daughter.

Kiyoshi Matsuo, a Japanese record producer, who discussed Johnny Kitagawa's sexual harassment allegations in various media outlets, had his management contract terminated by Johnny & Associates, to which he had belonged. In 2023, he alleged that Yamashita and his wife Mariya Takeuchi, who also belong to the company, were in agreement with the company's policy. On July 9, 2023, Yamashita responded on his radio show, "Sunday Songbook". He explained that as someone in a corner of the music industry, he knew nothing of the internal affairs in Johnny's, much less about Johnny Kitagawa's sexual assault case. Yamashita stated that he is grateful for Johnny as a producer and had great respect for him, but said that sexual assault was "unforgivable" and called for the case to be investigated and the victims to be assisted.

== Discography ==
Studio albums

- Circus Town (1976)
- Spacy (1977)
- Go Ahead! (1978)
- Moonglow (1979)
- Ride on Time (1980)
- On the Street Corner (1980)
- For You (1982)
- Melodies (1983)
- Big Wave (1984)
- Pocket Music (1986)
- On the Street Corner 2 (1986)
- Boku no Naka no Shounen (1988)
- Artisan (1991)
- Season's Greetings (1993)
- Cozy (1998)
- On the Street Corner 3 (1999)
- Sonorite (2005)
- Ray of Hope (2011)
- Softly (2022)

== Awards ==
Japan Record Awards
Year	Title	Category	Personnel
1980 (22nd)	Moonglow	Best Albums	(Performer, composer, arranger and producer: Yamashita / lyricist: Minako Yoshida)
1981 (23rd)	On the Street Corner	Best 10 Albums	(Performer, arranger, producer: Yamashita)
1982 (24th)	For You	Best 10 Albums	(Performer, composer, arranger and producer: Yamashita / lyricist: Minako Yoshida)
1983 (25th)	Melodies	Best 10 Albums	(Songwriter, producer, arranger, performer: Yamashita)
1986 (28th)	Pocket Music	Excellent Albums	(Songwriter, producer, arranger, performer: Yamashita)
1988 (30th)	Boku no Naka no Shounen	Excellent Albums	(Songwriter, producer, arranger, performer: Yamashita)
1991 (33rd)	Artisan	Excellent Albums	(Songwriter, producer, arranger, performer: Yamashita)
1993 (35th)	Quiet Life	Greatest Album	(Producer and arranger: Yamashita / Performer and songwriter: Mariya Takeuchi)
2003 (45th)	"Christmas Eve"	Special Prizes	(Songwriter, producer, arranger, performer: Yamashita)

Japan Gold Disc Award
Year	Song	Category	Personnel
1994 (9th)	Impressions	Grand-prix Album	(Producer and arranger: Yamashita / Songwriter and performer: Mariya Takeuchi / arranger: Katsuhisa Hattori / recording engineer: Yasuo Sato)
1998 (13th)	Cozy	Pop Albums of the Year	(Songwriter, producer, arranger, performer: Yamashita)
