= Onkio Haus =

Japanese recording studio company

Onkio Haus Inc., also called Onkyo House (株式会社音響ハウス; Kabushiki-gaisha Onkyō Hausu), is a company that operates sound recording, mixing and mastering studios in Ginza, Tokyo, owned by Magazine House, Ltd. and others. It also provides video editing and post-production services for TV programs and commercial film projects.

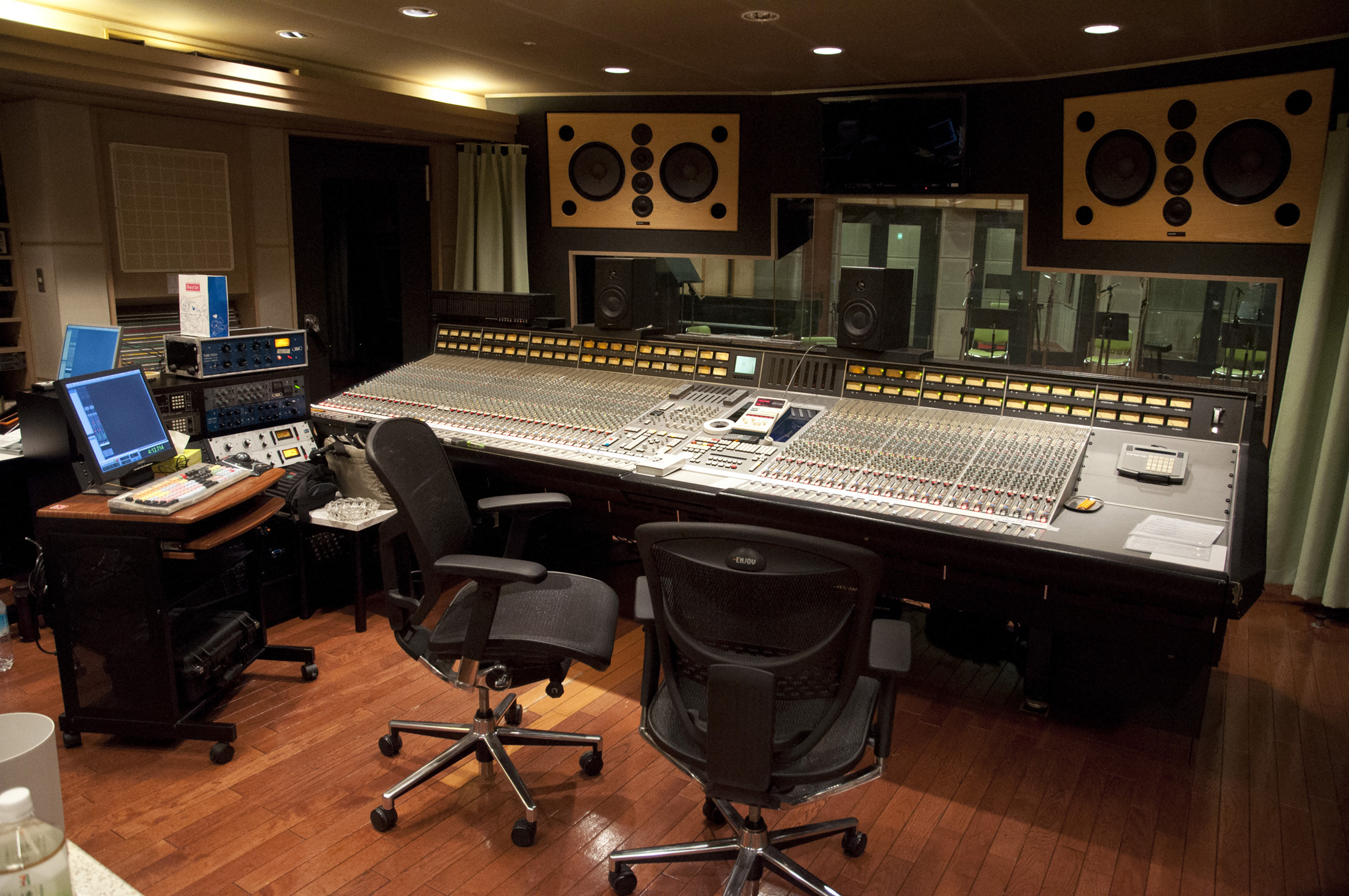
ONKIO HAUS Studio 1 Control Room with SSL SL9064J

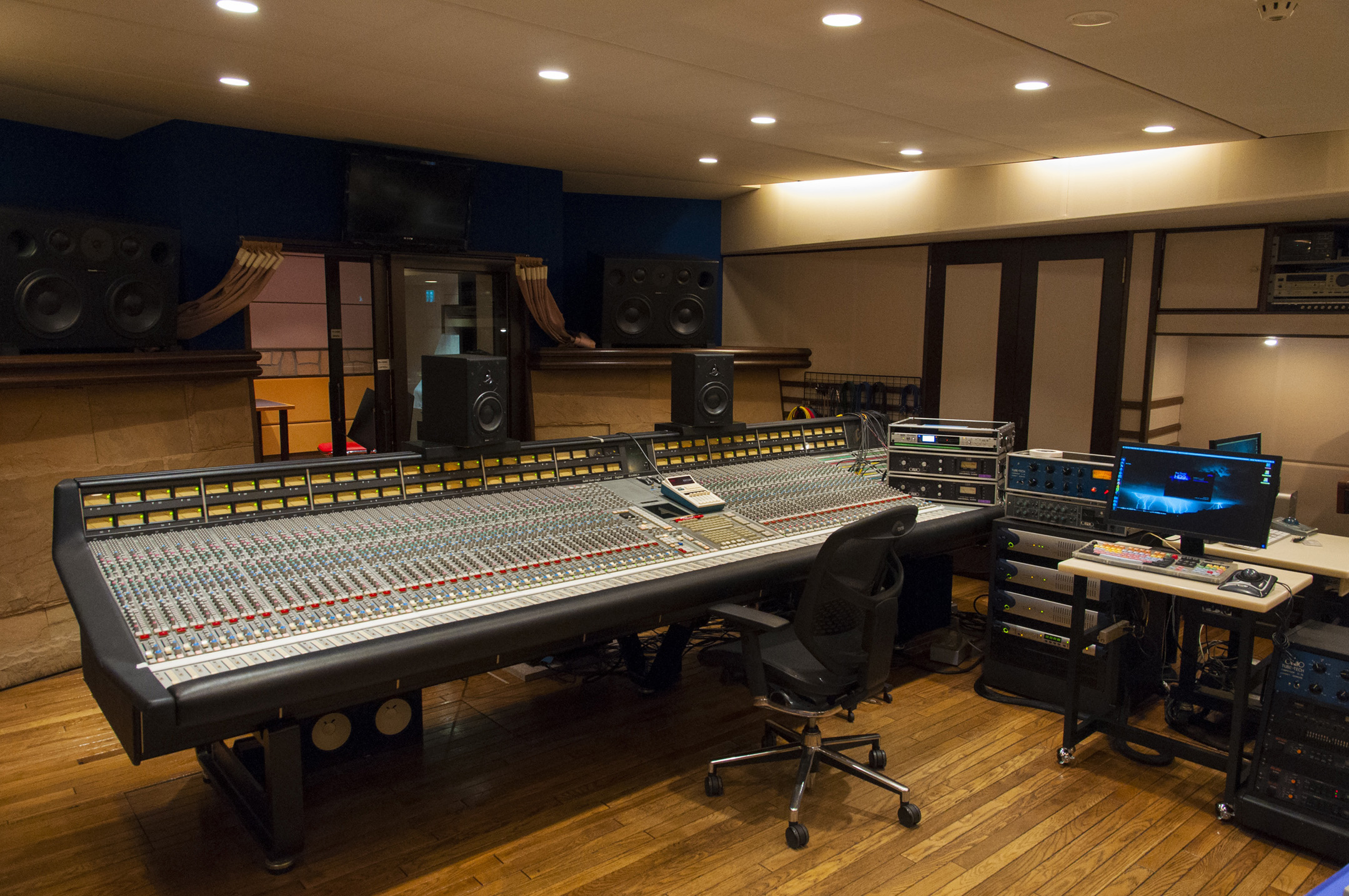
ONKIO HAUS Studio 6 Control Room with SSL SL4064G+

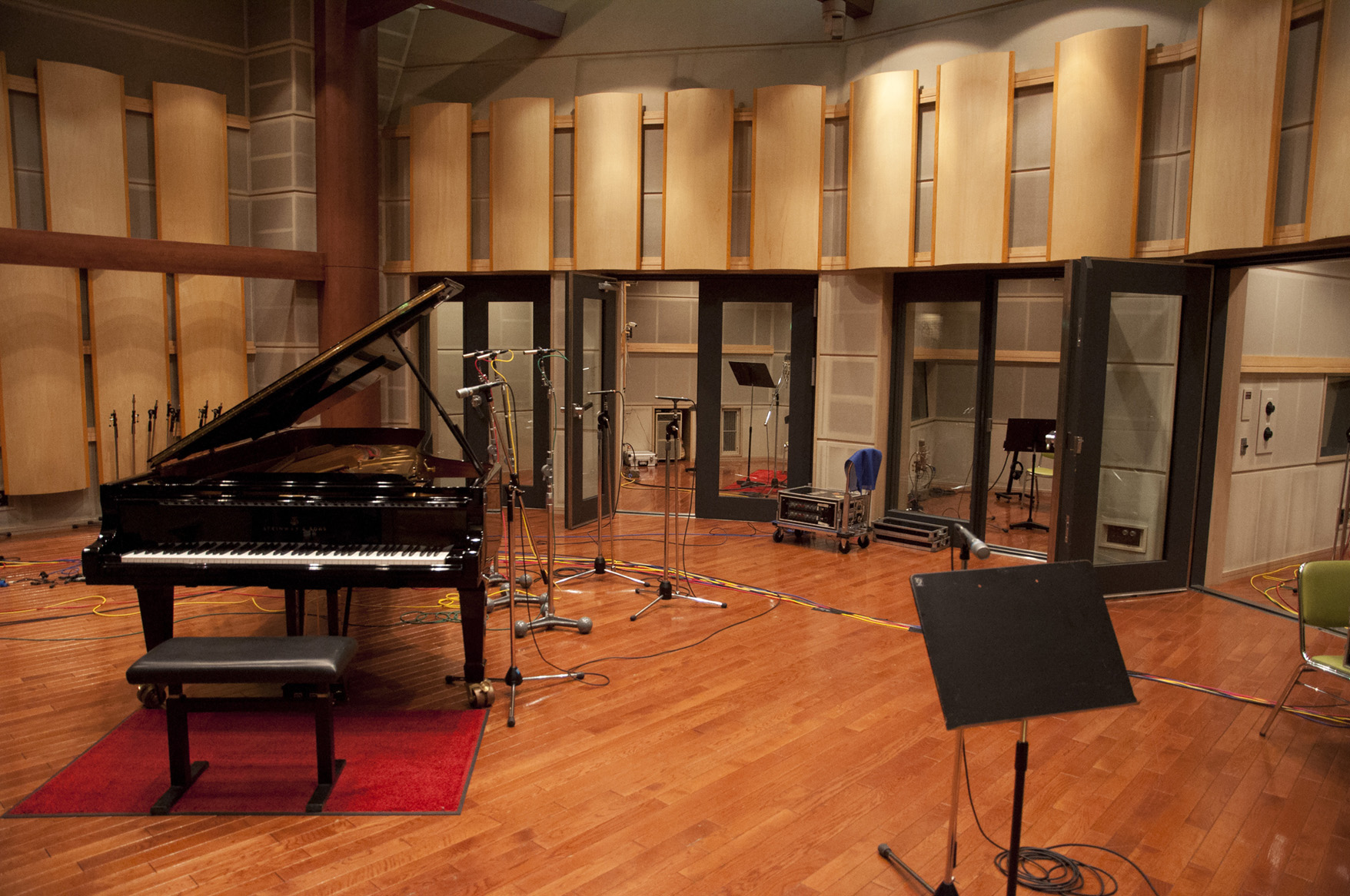
ONKIO HAUS Studio 1 Main Floor

== Studio facilities ==
Studio 1
- Mixing Console: SSL SL9064J-64VU, J Computer with Total Recall System
- Monitor Speakers: Dynaudio M4 CUSTOM, Yamaha NS-10M STUDIO, Dynaudio BM6
- Monitor Amplifier: CHORD SPA-1016DA 1232DA, CHORD SPA-1016DA, Sony TA-N 86
- Digital Audio Workstation: Pro Tools|HD3 Accel
- Audio Interface: 192 i/o (x4) 48in/48out
- Multitrack Recorder: Sony PCM-3348, Studer A820M SR/A (with ADAMS.SMITH ZETA-III)
- Master Recorder: Studer A820 (1/2 Inch Head Option), Panasonic SV-3700
- Reverb: EMT-140, Lexicon 480L, AMS rmx-16, Sony DRE-2000, Sony MU-R201, Yamaha REV-7, Roland SRV-2000
- Effector: AMS DMX 15-80S, Roland SDE-3000A, Yamaha SPX-990, Yamaha SPX-90 II, Eventide H-3000 SE
- Limiter/Compressor: Neve 33609, TUBE-TECH LCA-2B, UREI 1176LN (Silver)
- Piano: Steinway & Sons Model-D
Studio 2
- Mixing Console: SSL SL4064G+ 64VU, G Computer with Total Recall System
- Monitor Speakers: Westlake TM-3, Yamaha NS-10M STUDIO
- Monitor Amplifier: Goldmund Mimesis 28 Evolution, CHORD SPA-1016DA, Sony TA-N 86
- Digital Audio Workstation: Pro Tools|HD3 Accel
- Audio Interface: 192 i/o (x4) 48in/48out
- Multi Track Recorder: Sony PCM-3348, Studer A820M SR/A (with ADAMS.SMITH ZETA-III)
- Master Recorder: Studer A820 (1/2 Inch Head Option), Panasonic SV-3700
- Reverb: EMT-140TS, Lexicon 480L, AMS rmx-16, Sony DRE-2000, Sony MU-R 201, Yamaha REV-7, Roland SRV-2000
- Effector: AMS DMX 15-80S, Roland SDE-3000, Yamaha SPX-990, Yamaha SPX-90 II, Eventide H-3000 SE
- Limiter/Compressor: Neve 33609, UREI 1176LN (Black)
- Piano: Steinway & Sons Model-C
Studio 3
- Control Surface: Digidesign Control24
- Monitor Speakers: ADAM S5A MK2 (x5), Genelec 7070A Subwoofer (x2), Dynaudio BM-6, Yamaha NS-10M STUDIO
- Monitor Amplifier: CHORD SPA-1016DA
- Digital Audio Workstation: Pro Tools|HD2 Accel
- Audio Interface: 192 i/o (x1) 16in/8out
- Master Recorder: Panasonic SV-3700, Panasonic SV-3800
- Mic Preamp: Focusrite ISA-110
- Reverb: EMT 140TS, Lexicon 480L, Yamaha REV-5
- Limiter/Compressor: Neve 33609, UREI LA-4, TUBE-TECH CL-1B
Studio 6
- Mixing Console: SSL SL4064G+ 64VU, G Computer with Total Recall System
- Monitor Speakers: Dynaudio M-3, Yamaha NS-10M STUDIO, Dynaudio BM6
- Monitor Amplifier: Goldmund 29M Evolution, CHORD SPA-1016DA
- Digital Audio Workstation: Pro Tools|HD5 Accel
- Audio Interface: 192 i/o (x4) 24in/48out
- Master Recorder: Studer A820 (1/2 Inch Head Option), Panasonic SV-3700
- Reverb: EMT-140, Lexicon 480L, AMS rmx-16, Sony DRE-2000, Sony MU-R201, Yamaha REV-7, Roland SRV-2000
- Effector: AMS DMX 15-80S, Roland SDE-3000, Yamaha SPX-990, Yamaha SPX-90 II, Eventide H-3500 DFX/E
- Limiter/Compressor: Neve 33609, UREI 1176LN (Black), TUBE-TECH CL-1B
Common Items
- Reverb: Lexicon 224XL
- Mic Preamp: Neve 1073, SHEP 1073, Focusrite ISA115, AMEK 9098, Drawmer 1960, Grace Designs m801
- Limiter/Compressor: dbx 160XT, dbx 165A, Neve 2254, BSS DPR 402, Orban Deesser 526A, EL8M Distressor
- A/D Converter: GML9300H
- Effector: Lexicon M93 Primetime, Eventide H3000, Eventide H949, Roland SDE-2000, EXR III EXCITER, SONG BIRD FS1, SONG BIRD TSC1380, MXR Auto Flanger, MXR Phase Shifter

== Discography ==
- 2011: Shine On! Volume One (Released September 30, 2011)

== Gallery ==
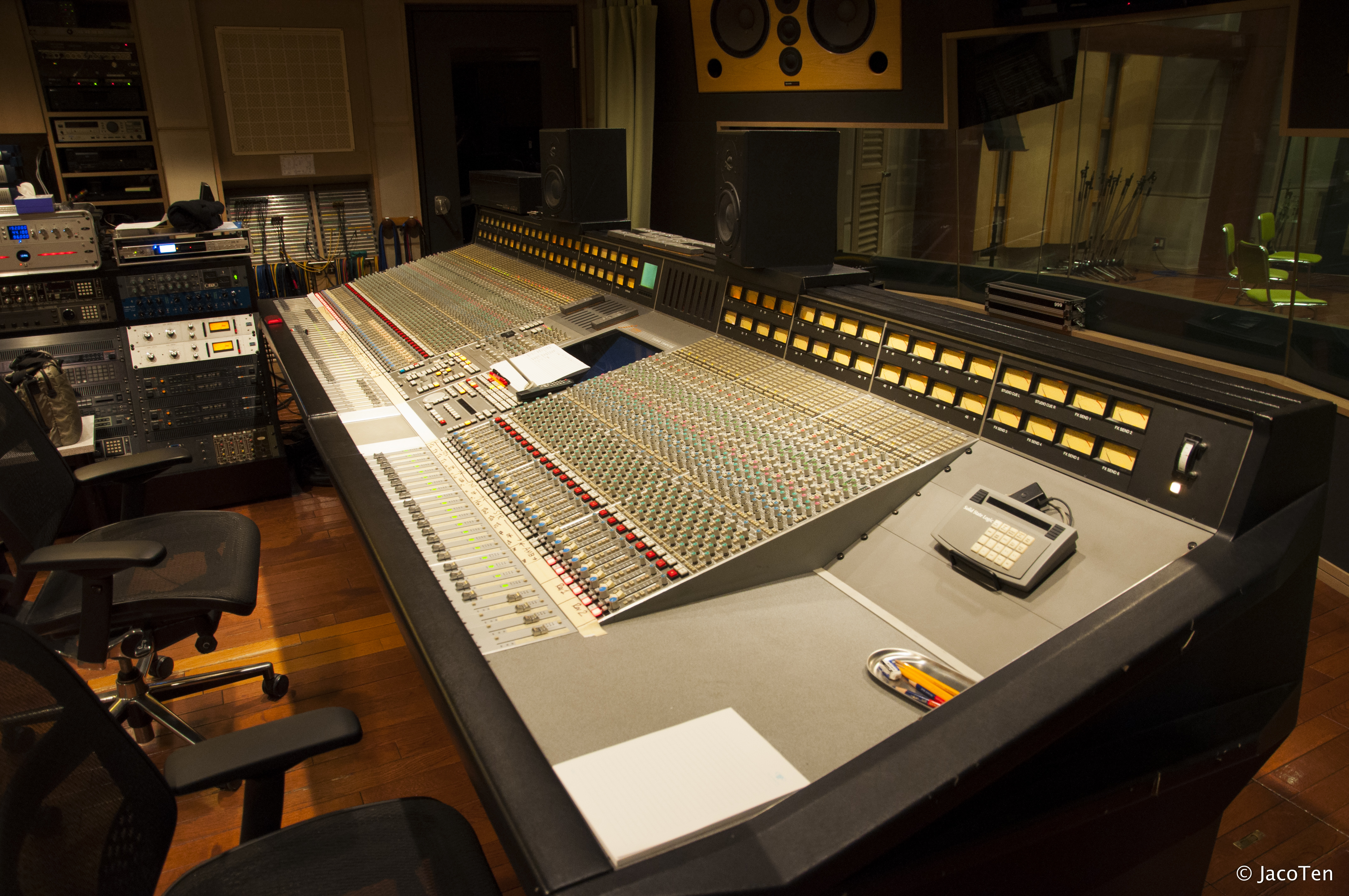
SSL SL9064J at Studio 1

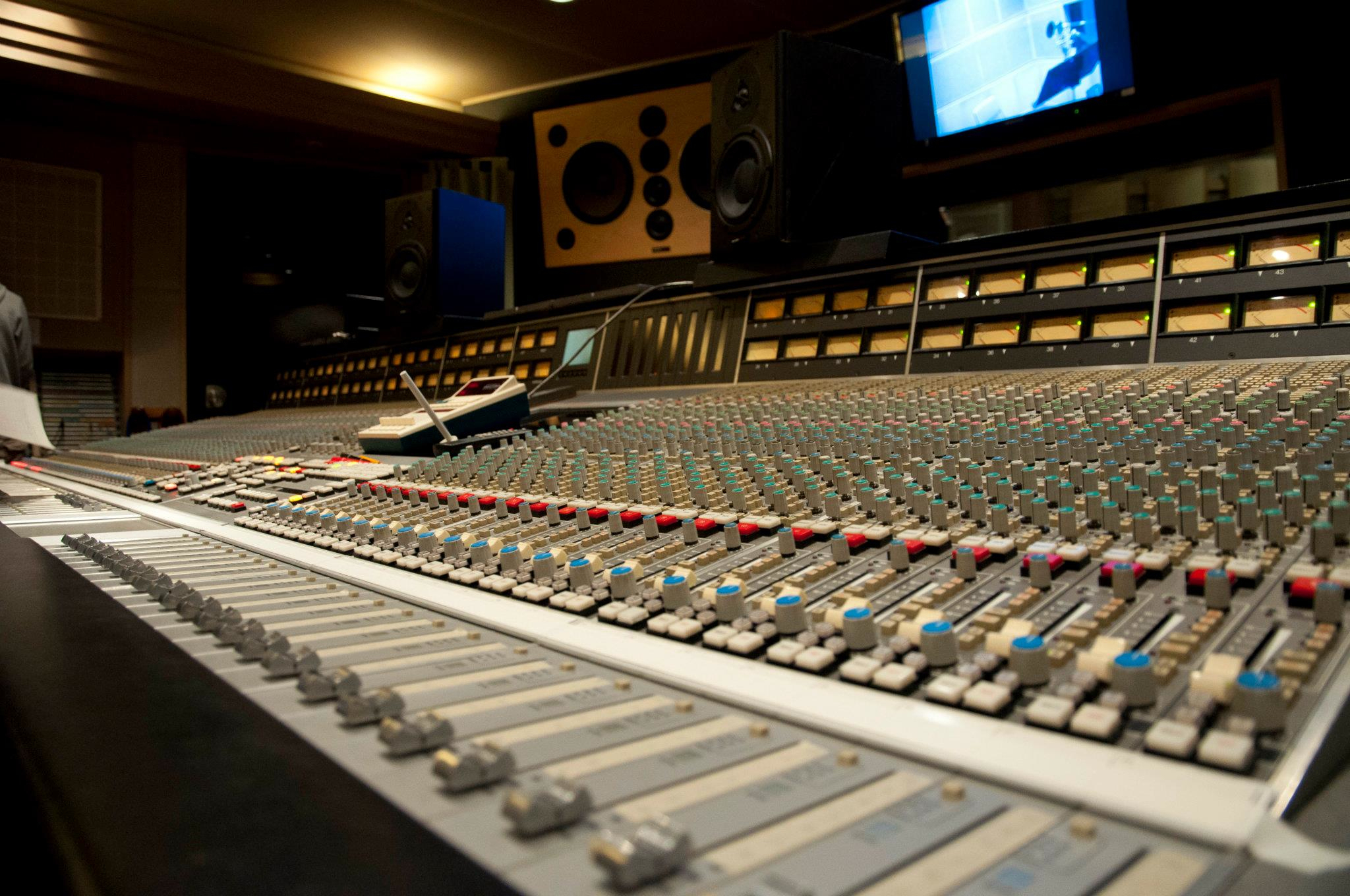
SSL SL9064J Close up at Studio 1

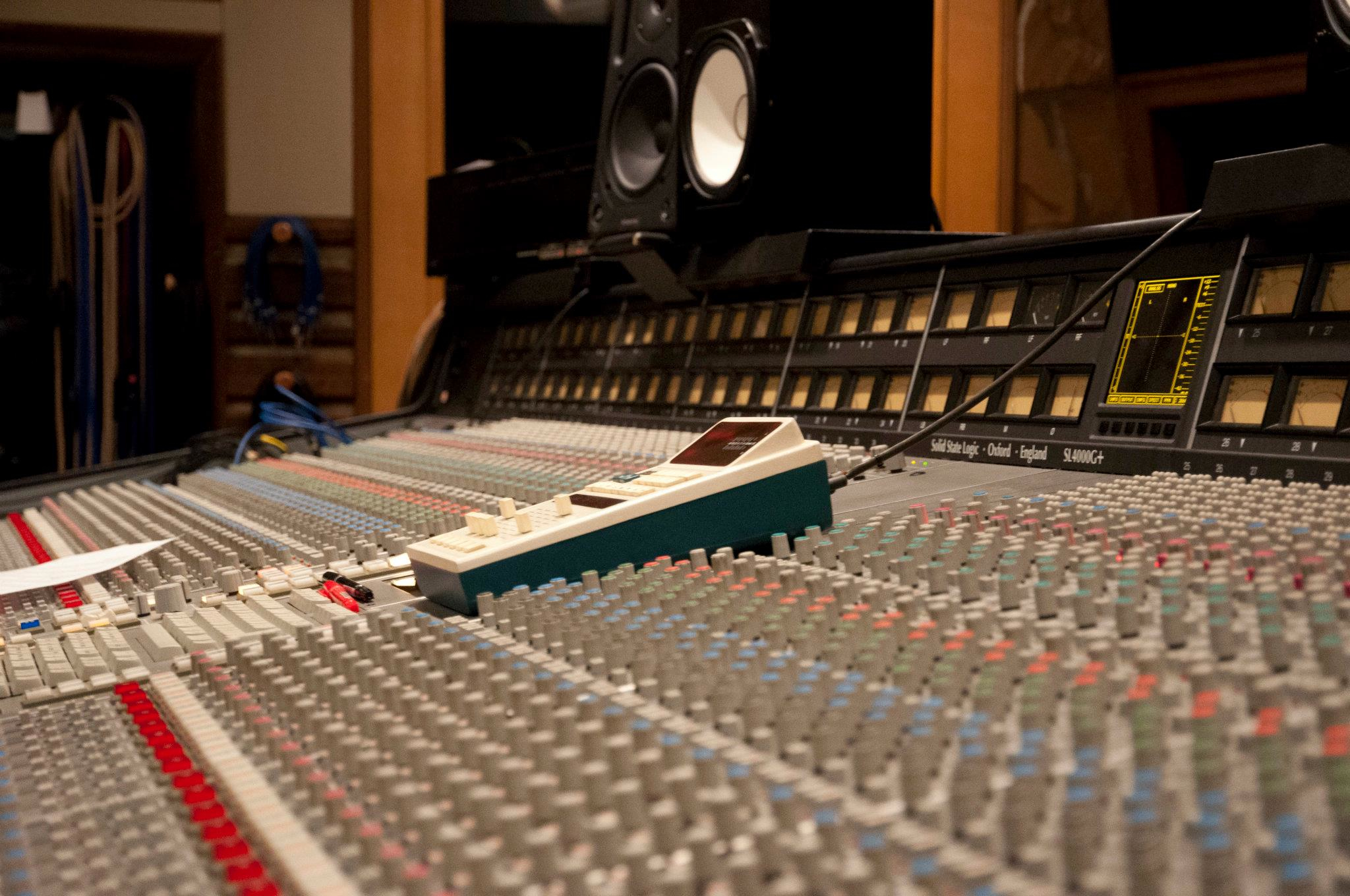
SSL SL4064G+ with Lexicon 480L LARC at Studio 2

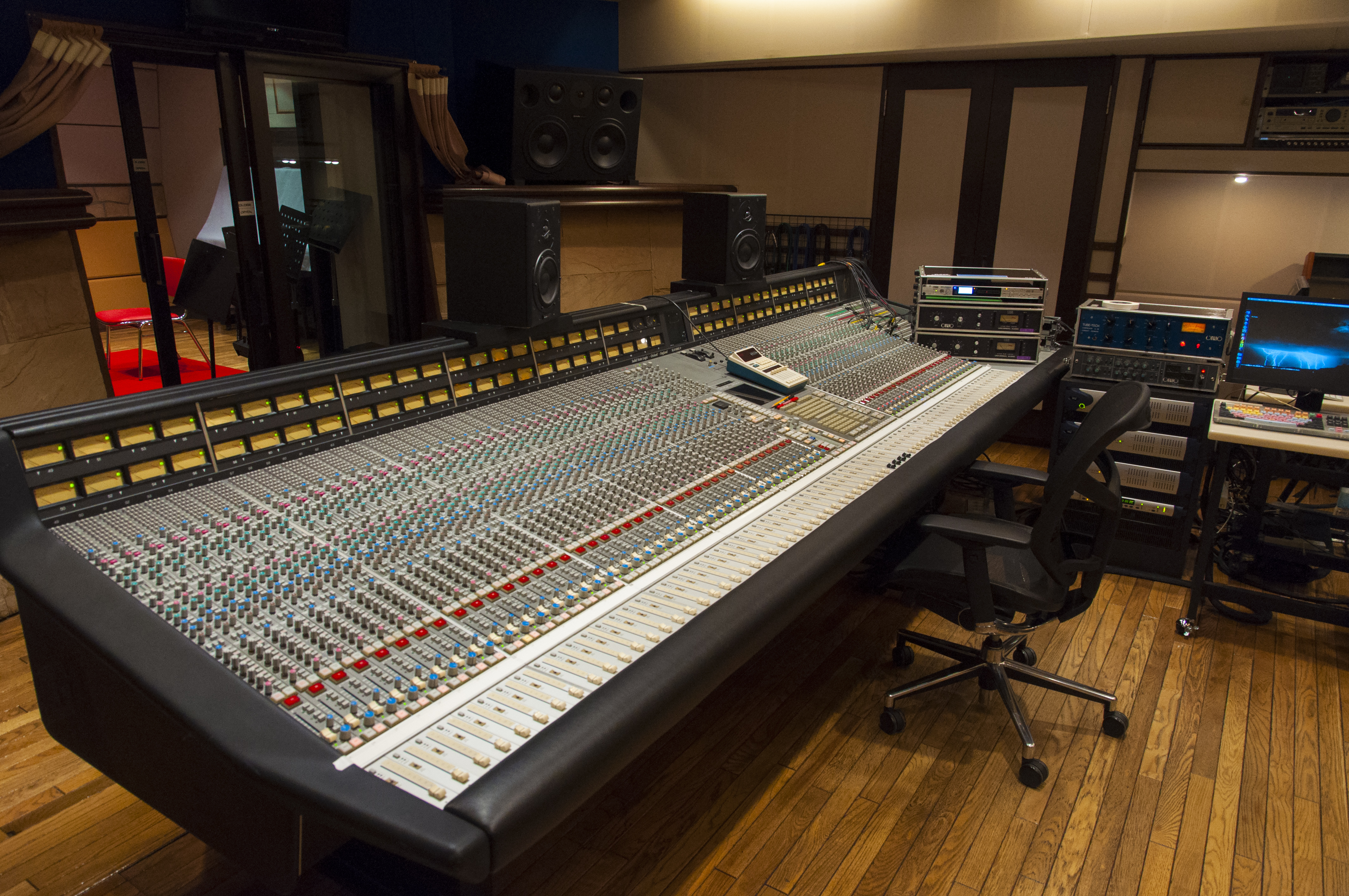
SSL SL4064G+ at Studio 6

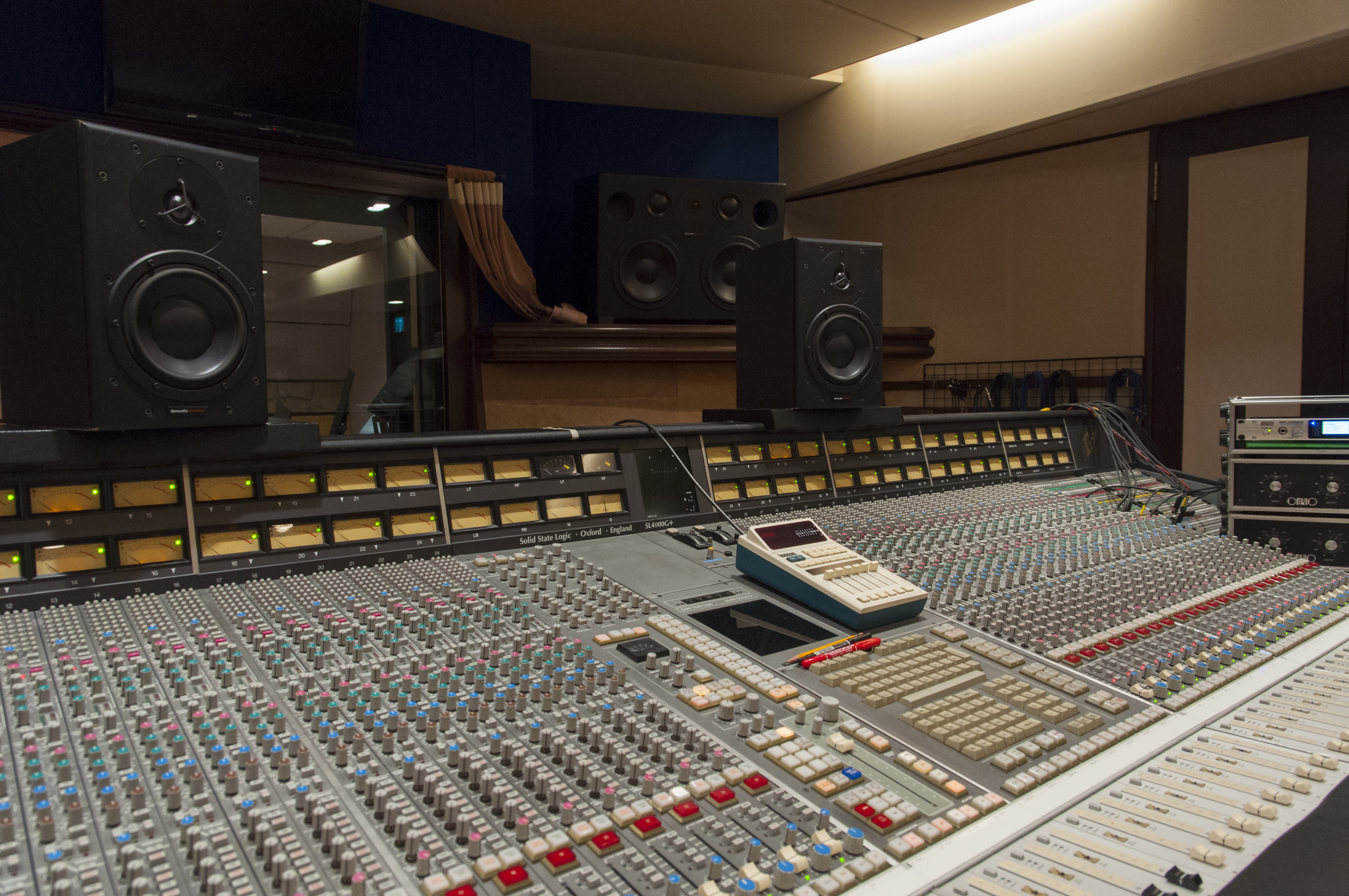
SSL SL4064G+ with Dynaudio BM6 at ONKIO 6

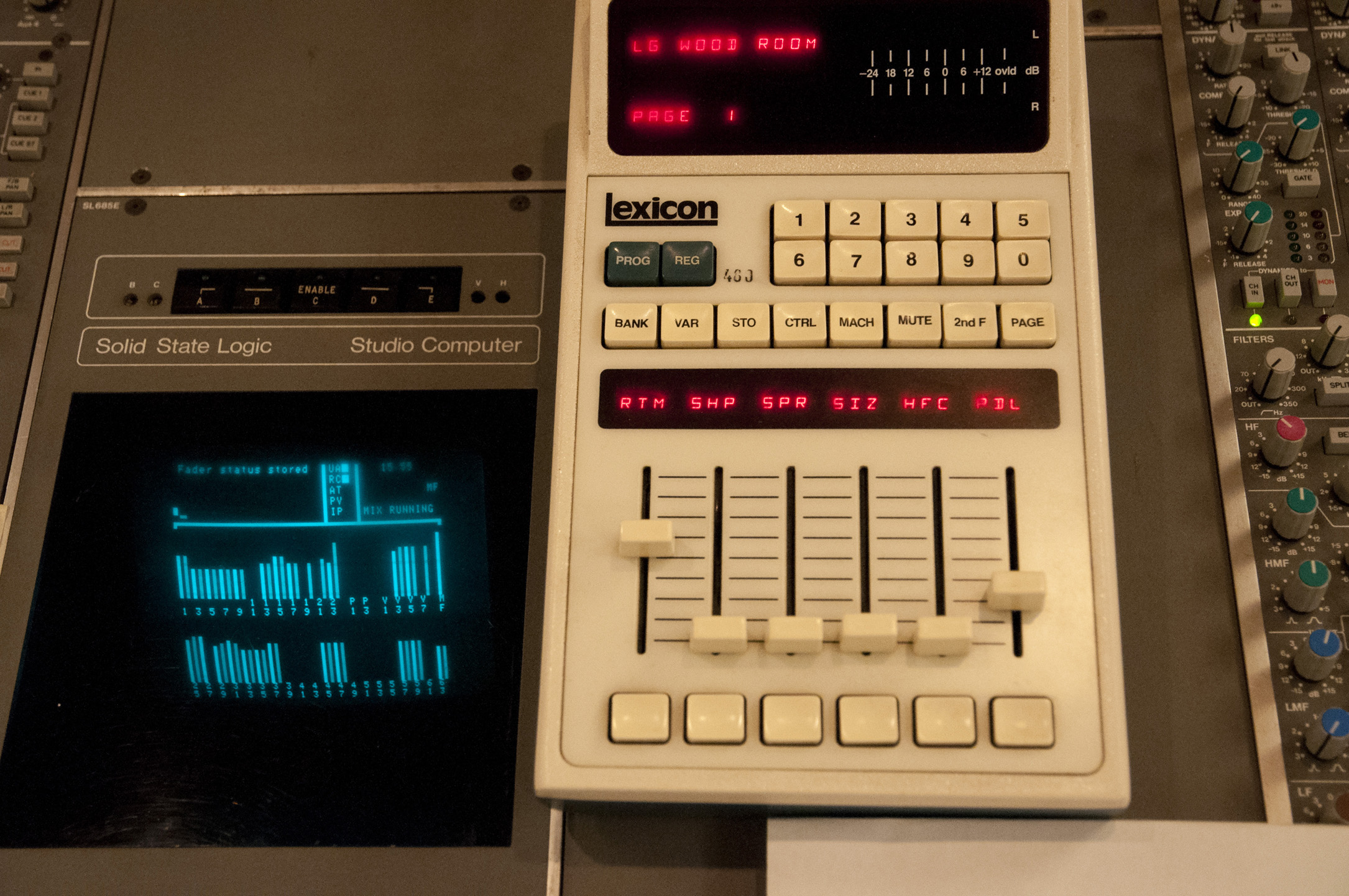
SSL Studio Computer Display
