= For You (Tatsuro Yamashita album) =

Studio album by Tatsuro Yamashita
- Released: January 21, 1982
- Studio: CBS/SONY Roppongi Studio
- Genres: City pop, Funk, Soul, Pop, Ballad
- Length: 39:02; 51:18 (2002 reissue)
- Labels: AIR/RVC; AIR/BMG Funhouse (2002 reissue); Sony Music Labels/Ariola (2023 remaster)
- Producer: Tatsuro Yamashita

Tatsuro Yamashita chronology
On the Street Corner (1980)	For You (1982)	Greatest Hits! of Tatsuro Yamashita (1982)

Singles from For You
- 1. "Loveland, Island / Your Eyes" Released: January 23, 2002

For You is the sixth studio album by Japanese singer-songwriter Tatsuro Yamashita, released in January 1982.

== Overview ==
In 1980, Tatsuro Yamashita's single Ride on Time became a hit, as did the album of the same name. Yamashita would hold frequent live concerts throughout 1981 as a result, making it difficult to plan for his next album, but his band continued to improve as they performed. Yamashita said about the success of Ride on Time, "This album finally fulfills my dream from the time of Sugar Babe, I wanted to record as much as I wanted without worrying about budget and time".

When For You released in 1982, it became Yamashita's second hit studio album, peaking at number one on the Oricon LP charts and number two on the CT charts. It was also his last studio album under the AIR/RVC label. Later that year, he married Mariya Takeuchi on April 6. Originally, the song "Morning Glory" was written for Takeuchi's album Miss M. The songs "Sparkle" and "Loveland Island" were used as commercial songs for Suntory beer. Meanwhile, the song "Your Eyes" was used as a commercial song for Nissui starring Bunta Sugawara.

At this time, advances were made in car stereos and Walkman devices that gave portable music devices improved audio quality. The album was produced and promoted with this in mind to reinforce the 'resort pop' feeling, with the slogan "Summer, the sea, Tatsuro!" officially cementing his image as the "Summer Song Guy". Originally, Yamashita was thinking of requesting Hiroshi Nagai to make the album cover, but at that time Nagai had already decided to work on the album cover for Eiichi Ohtaki's album A Long Vacation. Eizin Suzuki instead created For You's cover art.

In the 2002 reissue of the album, four bonus tracks were added. The bonus track "Every Night" was an unpublished cover Yamashita recorded of Mariya Takeuchi's song from her album Miss M. Loveland, Island / Your Eyes was released as a single the same year. The song Loveland, Island was used as the ending theme for the Japanese drama series The Long Love Letter.

== Track listing ==
All music is composed by Tatsuro Yamashita

Side A
No.	Title	Lyrics	Length
1.	"Sparkle"	Minako Yoshida	4:13
2.	"Music Book"	Minako Yoshida	5:08
3.	"Interlude A Part I"	—	0:23
4.	"Morning Glory"	Tatsuro Yamashita	3:28
5.	"Interlude A Part II"	—	0:25
6.	"Futari"	Minako Yoshida	5:46
Total length:			19:23

Side B
No.	Title	Lyrics	Length
1.	"Loveland, Island"	Tatsuro Yamashita	4:29
2.	"Interlude B Part I"	—	0:16
3.	"Love Talkin' (Honey It's You)"	Minako Yoshida	5:50
4.	"Hey Reporter!"	Tatsuro Yamashita	5:33
5.	"Interlude B Part II"	—	0:17
6.	"Your Eyes"	Alan O'Day	3:14
Total length:			19:39

=== 2002 reissue ===
No.	Title	Lyrics	Length
1.	"Sparkle"	Minako Yoshida	4:15
2.	"Music Book"	Minako Yoshida	5:10
3.	"Interlude A Part I"	—	0:22
4.	"Morning Glory"	Tatsuro Yamashita	3:29
5.	"Interlude A Part II"	—	0:25
6.	"Futari"	Minako Yoshida	5:50
7.	"Loveland, Island"	Tatsuro Yamashita	4:29
8.	"Interlude B Part I"	—	0:16
9.	"Love Talkin' (Honey It's You)"	Minako Yoshida	5:52
10.	"Hey Reporter!"	Tatsuro Yamashita	5:34
11.	"Interlude B Part II"	—	0:17
12.	"Your Eyes"	Alan O'Day	3:19
13.	"あまく危険な香り [Amaku Kiken na Kaori, Sweet and Dangerous Scent]"	Tatsuro Yamashita	3:22
14.	"あまく危険な香り [Amaku Kiken na Kaori, TV Instrumental Version 1]"	—	3:00
15.	"あまく危険な香り [Amaku Kiken na Kaori, TV Instrumental Version 2]"	—	1:44
16.	"Every Night"	Alan O'Day	3:54
Total length:			51:18

== Credits ==
Sparkle

- Tatsuro Yamashita: Electric Guitar, Electric Piano, Percussion & Background Vocals
- Jun Aoyama: Drums
- Koki Ito: Bass
- Hiroyuki Namba: Acoustic Piano, Synth
- Hidefumi Toki: Alto Sax Solo
- Minako Yoshida: Background Vocals
- Shin Kazuhara: Trumpet
- Masahiro Kobayashi: Trumpet
- Shigeharu Mukai: Trombone
- Tadanori Konakawa: Trombone
- Takeru Muraoka: Tenor Sax
- Shunzo Sunahara: Baritone Sax

Music Book

- Tatsuro Yamashita: Percussion & Background Vocals
- Yuichi Togashiki: Drums
- Akira Okazawa: Bass
- Tsunehide Matsuki: Electric Guitar
- Hiroshi Sato: Electric Piano
- Motoya Hamaguchi: Percussion
- Shigeharu Mukai: Trombone Solo
- Minako Yoshida: Background Vocals
- Shin Kazuhara: Trumpet
- Masahiro Kobayashi: Trumpet
- Yasuo Hirauchi: Trombone
- Sumio Okada: Trombone
- Takeru Muraoka: Tenor Sax
- Shunzo Sunahara: Baritone Sax
- Tadaaki Ohno: Strings Concert Master

Interlude A Part I

- Tatsuro Yamashita: All Voices

Morning Glory

- Tatsuro Yamashita: Acoustic Piano, Electric Guitar, Marimba, Percussion & Background Vocals
- Jun Aoyama: Drums
- Koki Ito: Bass
- Kazuo Shiina: Electric Guitar
- Hiroyuki Namba: Electric Piano
- Shin Kazuhara: Trumpet
- Masahiro Kobayashi: Trumpet
- Shigeharu Mukai: Trombone
- Tadanori Konakawa: Trombone
- Takeru Muraoka: Tenor Sax
- Shunzo Sunahara: Baritone Sax

Interlude A Part II

- Tatsuro Yamashita: All Voices

Futari

- Tatsuro Yamashita: Electric Guitar, Percussion & Background Vocals
- Jun Aoyama: Drums
- Koki Ito: Bass
- Hiroshi Sato: Acoustic Piano & Electric Piano
- Hiroyuki Namba: KORG λ String (KORG Lambda)
- Hidefumi Toki: Alto Sax
- Tadaaki Ohno: Strings Concert Master

Loveland, Island

- Tatsuro Yamashita: Electric Guitar (Right) & Background Vocals
- Jun Aoyama: Drums
- Koki Ito: Bass
- Kazuo Shiina: Electric Guitar (Left)
- Hiroyuki Namba: Acoustic Piano, Electric Piano, Synthesizer
- Motoya Hamaguchi: Percussion
- Hidefumi Toki: Alto Sax Solo
- Keiko Yamakawa: Harp

Interlude B Part I

- Tatsuro Yamashita: All Voices

Love Talkin' (Honey It's You)

- Tatsuro Yamashita: Electric Guitar, Guitar Synthesizer, Electric Piano, Acoustic Piano. Glocken, Percussion & Background Vocals
- Jun Aoyama: Drums
- Koki Ito: Bass
- Hiroyuki Namba: KORG PS-3100 Synthesizer
- Keiko Yamakawa: Harp
- Minako Yoshida: Background Vocals

Hey Reporter!

- Tatsuro Yamashita: Electric Guitar, Electric Piano, Acoustic Piano & Background Vocals
- Jun Aoyama: Drums
- Koki Ito: Bass
- Hiroyuki Namba: Acoustic Piano

Interlude B Part II

- Tatsuro Yamashita: All Voices

Your Eyes

- Tatsuro Yamashita: Electric Guitar, Electric Piano, Electric Sitar, Percussion & Background Vocals
- Jun Aoyama: Drums
- Koki Ito: Bass
- Chuei Yoshikawa: Acoustic Guitar
- Hiroyuki Namba: Acoustic Piano
- Hidefumi Toki: Alto Sax Solo
- Tadaaki Ohno: Strings Concert Master
- Hiroki Inui: Strings Arrangement

あまく危険な香り [Amaku Kiken na Kaori] (same personnel for TV Instrumental Version 1)

- Tatsuro Yamashita: Electric Guitar (Left), Acoustic Piano Solo & Percussion
- Jun Aoyama: Drums
- Koki Ito: Bass
- Tsunehide Matsuki: Electric Guitar (Right)
- Hiroyuki Namba: Electric Piano
- Motoya Hamaguchi: Percussion
- Shin Kazuhara: Trumpet
- Masahiro Kobayashi: Trumpet
- Shigeharu Mukai: Trombone
- Tadanori Konakawa: Trombone
- Takeru Muraoka: Tenor Sax
- Shunzo Sunahara: Baritone Sax
- Tadaaki Ohno: Strings Concert Master
- Masahide Sakuma: Strings Arrangement

あまく危険な香り [Amaku Kiken na Kaori, TV Instrumental Version 2]

- Tatsuro Yamashita: Electric Guitar & Percussion
- Jun Aoyama: Drums
- Koki Ito: Bass
- Hiroyuki Namba: Keyboards
- Hidefumi Toki: Alto Sax Solo

Every Night

- Tatsuro Yamashita: Electric Guitar & Percussion
- Jun Aoyama: Drums
- Koki Ito: Bass
- Hiroyuki Namba: Keyboards
- Motoya Hamaguchi: Percussion

Production / Credits Taken from the inner sleeve notes of the album. (RAL-8801)

- Produced by Tatsuro Yamashita for Smile Company
- Associate Producer: Ryuzo "Junior" Kosugi
- Production Co-ordinator: Nobumasa Uchida
- Recording Engineer Tamotsu Yoshida, Toshiro Itoh
- Re-mix Engineer: Tamotsu Yoshida
- Assistant Engineers: Masato Ohmori, Shigemi Watanabe, Akira Fukada
- Instrument Maintenance: Takeshi Yamamoto
- Recorded at CBS/SONY Roppongi Studio A & B
- Re-mixed at CBS/SONY Roppongi Studio B
- Mastering Studio: JVC Yokohama Cutting Studio
- Disc Mastering Engineer: Tohru Kotetsu
- Cover Illustration: Eizin Suzuki
- Design: Hiroshi Takahara
- Inner Photograph: Nobuo Kubota

== Chart positions ==
Year	Album	Country	Chart	Position	Sales
1982	For You	Japan	Oricon Weekly LP Albums Chart (top 100)	1	439,000
1982	For You	Japan	Oricon Weekly CT Albums Chart (top 100)	2	257,000
1985	For You [Limited edition, picture disc]	Japan	Oricon Weekly LP Albums Chart (top 100)	60	4,000
2002	For You [Remastered reissue]	Japan	Oricon Weekly Albums Chart	16	39,000

== Awards ==
24th Japan Record Awards
Date	Title	Category	Winner
December 31, 1982	For You	Best 10 Albums	Tatsuro Yamashita

== Release history ==
Country	Date	Label	Format	Catalog Number
Japan	January 21, 1982	AIR/RVC	LP	RAL-8801
Japan	January 21, 1982	AIR/RVC	CT	RAT-8801
Japan	1984	AIR/RVC	CD	RACD-4
Japan	June 5, 1985	AIR/RVC	LP	RAL-8827
Japan	September 15, 1986	AIR/RVC	CD	R32A-1020
Japan	March 15, 1987	AIR/RVC	CD	R28H-2806
Japan	August 21, 1990	RCA/BMG Victor	CD	BVCR-7006
Japan	September 21, 1990	RCA/BMG Victor	CD	BVCR-2504
Japan	June 4, 1997	RCA/BMG Japan	CD	BVCR-1033
Japan	May 21, 1999	RCA/BMG Japan	CD	BVCK-37011
Japan	February 14, 2002	RCA/BMG Funhouse	CD	BVCR-17018
Japan	February 20, 2002	RCA/BMG Funhouse	LP	BVJR-17008
Japan	May 3, 2023	Sony Music Labels/Ariola	LP	BVJL-90
Japan	May 3, 2023	Sony Music Labels/Ariola	CT	BVTL-2

== See also ==
- 1982 in Japanese music
