= List of Oricon number-one singles of 1982 =

The highest-selling singles in Japan are ranked in the Oricon Singles Chart, which is published by Oricon Style magazine. The data are compiled by Oricon based on each singles' physical sales. This list includes the singles that reached the number one place on that chart in 1982.

== Oricon Weekly Singles Chart ==
Issue date	Song	Artist(s)	Ref.
January 4	"Sailor Fuku to Kikanjū"	Hiroko Yakushimaru	
January 11	"Sailor Fuku to Kikanjū"	Hiroko Yakushimaru	
January 18	"Sailor Fuku to Kikanjū"	Hiroko Yakushimaru	
January 25	"Jōnetsu Neppū Serenade"	Masahiko Kondō	
February 1	"Jōnetsu Neppū Serenade"	Masahiko Kondō	
February 8	"Akai Sweet Pea"	Seiko Matsuda	
February 15	"Akai Sweet Pea"	Seiko Matsuda	
February 22	"Akai Sweet Pea"	Seiko Matsuda	
March 1	"Kokoro no Iro"	Masatoshi Nakamura	
March 8	"Kokoro no Iro"	Masatoshi Nakamura	
March 15	"Kokoro no Iro"	Masatoshi Nakamura	
March 22	"Kokoro no Iro"	Masatoshi Nakamura	
March 29	"Kokoro no Iro"	Masatoshi Nakamura	
April 5	"Ikenai Rouge Magic"	Kiyoshiro Imawano & Ryuichi Sakamoto	
April 12	"Furarete Banzai"	Masahiko Kondō	
April 19	"Furarete Banzai"	Masahiko Kondō	
April 26	"Furarete Banzai"	Masahiko Kondō	
May 3	"Furarete Banzai"	Masahiko Kondō	
May 10	"Nagisa no Balcony"	Seiko Matsuda	
May 17	"Harajuku Kiss"	Toshihiko Tahara	
May 24	"Harajuku Kiss"	Toshihiko Tahara	
May 31	"Harajuku Kiss"	Toshihiko Tahara	
June 7	"Madonna-tachi no Lullaby"	Hiromi Iwasaki	
June 14	"Madonna-tachi no Lullaby"	Hiromi Iwasaki	
June 21	"Madonna-tachi no Lullaby"	Hiromi Iwasaki	
June 28	"Madonna-tachi no Lullaby"	Hiromi Iwasaki	
July 5	"Hyakuman Dollar Baby"	Johnny	
July 12	"Highteen Boogie"	Masahiko Kondō	
July 19	"Highteen Boogie"	Masahiko Kondō	
July 26	"Highteen Boogie"	Masahiko Kondō	
August 2	"Highteen Boogie"	Masahiko Kondō	
August 9	"Highteen Boogie"	Masahiko Kondō	
August 16	"Komugi Iro no Mermaid"	Seiko Matsuda	
August 23	"Kurayami wo Buttobase" (暗闇をぶっとばせ)	Daisuke Shima	
August 30	"Matsu wa"	Aming	
September 6	"Matsu wa"	Aming	
September 13	"Matsu wa"	Aming	
September 20	"Matsu wa"	Aming	
September 27	"Matsu wa"	Aming	
October 4	"Matsu wa"	Aming	
October 11	"Horeta ze! Kanpai"	Masahiko Kondō	
October 18	"Horeta ze! Kanpai"	Masahiko Kondō	
October 25	"Yūwaku Suresure"	Toshihiko Tahara	
November 1	"Yūwaku Suresure"	Toshihiko Tahara	
November 8	"Nobara no Etude"	Seiko Matsuda	
November 15	"Nobara no Etude"	Seiko Matsuda	
November 22	"Nobara no Etude"	Seiko Matsuda	
November 29	"Second Love"	Akina Nakamori	
December 6	"Second Love"	Akina Nakamori	
December 13	"Second Love"	Akina Nakamori	
December 20	"3 Nenme no Uwaki"	Hiroshi & Kibo	
December 27	"3 Nenme no Uwaki"	Hiroshi & Kibo	

== See also ==
- 1982 in Japanese music
