= Amaku Kiken na Kaori =

1982 song by Tatsuro Yamashita

Single by Tatsuro Yamashita

from the album Greatest Hits! of Tatsuro Yamashita
- B-side: "Music Book"
- Released: April 5, 1982
- Genre: Rock; Pop
- Length: 8:29 (Side A & B)
- Label: AIR/RVC
- Producer: Tatsuro Yamashita

Tatsuro Yamashita singles chronology
"Down Town" / "Paredo" (1982)	"Amaku Kiken na Kaori" (1982)	"Koukiatsu Girl" (1983)

"Amaku Kiken na Kaori" (あまく危険な香り, Sweet & Dangerous Scent) is the ninth single by Japanese singer-songwriter Tatsuro Yamashita, released in April 1982. This was his last single under the AIR/RVC label.

== Overview ==
Bob's Cafe sign, Sioux Falls, South Dakota, 1980

Amaku Kiken na Kaori was used as the theme song for the Japanese drama series of the same name.

This song was included in his Greatest hits album Greatest Hits! of Tatsuro Yamashita, Opus (All Time Best 1975-2012). The remastered reissue of For You contains an instrumental version and a one-shot long version recorded for BGM. The reissue of Ride on Time also included a karaoke version and the live album Joy contains a live version of the song. Meanwhile, "Music Book" is taken from his studio album For You. It is said that this song was transcribed from a passage called "Music Book" that Minako Yoshida wrote down in her notebook.

Yamashita originally wrote this song with the intention of having someone veteran singer sing it, but at the recommendation of director Ryuzo Kosugi, he said that he would release it as his own single, and the low-pitched piano phrase of the interlude. It seems that the tune of the "adult line", which had never existed before, seemed to be fresh on the contrary.

Eizin Suzuki made the art for the jacket. The front cover design features a Schlitz beer and the sign at the horizon mostly resembles "Bob's Cafe" sign located at Sioux Falls, South Dakota. In 2019, the sign was removed and made for sale. In the back cover, the advertisement for the album For You can be seen.

== Track listing ==
Side 1
No.	Title	Lyrics	Music	Length
1.	"Amaku Kiken na Kaori [あまく危険な香り]"	Tatsuro Yamashita	Tatsuro Yamashita	3:21

Side 2
No.	Title	Lyrics	Music	Length
1.	"Music Book"	Minako Yoshida	Tatsuro Yamashita	5:08

== Personnel ==
=== Amaku Kiken na Kaori ===
- Tatsuro Yamashita: Electric Guitar (Left), Acoustic Piano (Solo) & Percussion
- Jun Aoyama: Drums
- Koki Ito: Bass
- Tsunehide Matsuki: Electric Guitar (Right)
- Hiroyuki Namba: Keyboards
- Motoya Hamaguchi: Percussion
- Shin Kazuhara: Trumpet
- Masahiro Kobayashi: Trumpet
- Shigeharu Mukai: Trombone
- Tadanori Konakawa: Trombone
- Takeru Muraoka: Tenor Sax
- Shunzo Sunahara: Baritone Sax
- Tadaaki Ohno: Strings Concert Master
- Koji Hajima: Conductor
- Strings arranged by Masahide Sakuma

=== Music Book ===
(from the album For You)

- Tatsuro Yamashita: Percussion & Background Vocals
- Yuichi Togashiki: Drums
- Akira Okazawa: Bass
- Tsunehide Matsuki: Electric Guitar
- Hiroshi Sato: Electric Piano
- Motoya Hamaguchi: Percussion
- Shigeharu Mukai: Trombone Solo
- Minako Yoshida: Background Vocals
- Shin Kazuhara: Trumpet
- Masahiro Kobayashi: Trumpet
- Yasuo Hirauchi: Trombone
- Sumio Okada: Trombone
- Takeru Muraoka: Tenor Sax
- Shunzo Sunahara: Baritone Sax
- Tadaaki Ohno: Strings Concert Master

== Chart positions ==
=== Weekly charts ===
Year	Single	Chart	Position	Sales
1982	Amaku Kiken na Kaori	Oricon Weekly Singles Chart	12	236,000

=== Year-end charts ===
Year	Single	Chart	Position	Sales
1982	Amaku Kiken na Kaori	Oricon Yearly Singles Chart (top 100)	54	235,000

== Release history ==
Country	Date	Label	Format	Catalog number
Japan	April 5, 1982	AIR/RVC	7" Single	RAS-508

== See also ==
- 1982 in Japanese music
