= Ride on Time (Tatsuro Yamashita song) =

1980 single by Tatsuro Yamashita

Single by Tatsuro Yamashita

from the album Ride on Time
- B-side: "Rainy Walk"
- Released: May 1, 1980
- Genre: City pop
- Length: 9:30 (Side 1 & 2)
- Label: AIR/RVC
- Producer: Tatsuro Yamashita

Tatsuro Yamashita singles chronology
"Eien no Full Moon" (1979)	"Ride on Time" (1980)	"My Sugar Babe" (1980)

"Ride on Time" is the sixth single by Japanese singer-songwriter Tatsuro Yamashita, released in May 1980. This was his first single to enter the Oricon Singles Chart, peaking in at number three.

== Overview ==
"Ride on Time" is the lead single from the album of the same name, but the song was re-recorded in the album issue just four months later. This version would be included in his Greatest hits album "Greatest Hits! of Tatsuro Yamashita" in 1982 and "Opus (All Time Best 1975-2012)" in 2012. The live version was also included in his live album "Joy" in 1989.

This song was written for a Maxell cassette tape commercial. Yamashita himself had appeared in the commercial. The footage, shot in Saipan, shows him immersing himself in the sea near his knees with his back on the horizon, aiming a finger gun at the camera. One of the photographs would later be used as the cover for his single. At the end of the commercial, the caption "いい音しか残れない" can be seen which directly translates to English as "Only good sounds remain". The same caption can also be seen on his studio album "Ride on Time" and its Obi strip. The B-side track "Rainy Walk" was originally from his studio album Moonglow and has the same contents as the album.

== Track listing ==
Side 1
No.	Title	Lyrics	Music	Length
1.	"Ride on Time"	Tatsuro Yamashita	Tatsuro Yamashita	4:22

Side 2
No.	Title	Lyrics	Music	Length
1.	"Rainy Walk"	Minako Yoshida	Tatsuro Yamashita	5:08

== Personnel ==
=== Ride on Time ===
- Tatsuro Yamashita – Electric Guitar (Right), Kalimba, Percussion & Background Vocals
- Jun Aoyama – Drums
- Koki Ito – Bass
- Kazuo Shiina – Electric Guitar (Left)
- Hiroyuki Namba – Keyboards
- Hidefumi Toki – Alto Sax Solo
- Minako Yoshida – Background Vocals
- Shin Kazuhara – Trumpet
- Yoshikazu Kishi – Trumpet
- Shigeharu Mukai – Trombone
- Tadanori Konakawa – Trombone
- Takeru Muraoka – Tenor Sax
- Shunzo Sunahara – Baritone Sax

=== Rainy Walk ===
(from the studio album Moonglow)

- Tatsuro Yamashita – Percussion & Background Vocals
- Yukihiro Takahashi – Drums
- Haruomi Hosono – Bass
- Masaki Matsubara – Electric Guitar
- Hiroshi Sato – Electric Piano
- Masahito "Pecker" Hashida – Percussion
- Shin Kazuhara – Trumpet
- Yoshikazu Kishi – Trumpet
- Shigeharu Mukai – Trombone
- Tadanori Konakawa – Trombone
- Kazuo Suzuki – Tenor Sax
- Shunzo Sunahara – Baritone Sax
- Tadaaki Ohno – Strings Concert Master

== BVCR-19604 ==
"Ride on Time"

Single by Tatsuro Yamashita

from the album Ride on Time
- Released: February 19, 2003
- Genre: City pop; rock; pop
- Length: 16:32
- Label: AIR/BMG Funhouse
- Producer: Tatsuro Yamashita

Tatsuro Yamashita singles chronology
"Loveland, Island" (2002)	"Ride on Time" (2003)	"2000 Ton no Ame" / "Phoenix" (2003)

=== Overview ===
In 2003, the song was used as the ending theme for the TBS drama Good Luck!!. Yamashita replied: "It was just a sunny day. But I'm just happy that the song came back to life. This feeling cannot be expressed by my mouth. Especially because it is 'Ride on Time'."

A month later, the song would get a remastered reissue. The coupling song was changed from "Rainy Walk" to "Amaku Kiken na Kaori", which had previously been released as a single and was used as the theme song for the Japanese drama series of the same name. The single would peak at number thirteen on the Oricon Weekly Singles Chart. The fifth track of the CD release is a 30 second a cappella version that was previously used in a Maxell commercial in 1980. It features Yamashita in Mt. Tokachi, Hokkaido.

=== Track listing ===
All lyrics are written by Tatsuro Yamashita; all music is composed by Tatsuro Yamashita.

No.	Title	Length
1.	"Ride on Time"	4:26
2.	"あまく危険な香り [Amaku Kiken na Kaori, Sweet & Dangerous Scent]"	3:24
3.	"Ride on Time (Karaoke Version)"	4:31
4.	"あまく危険な香り [Amaku Kiken na Kaori, Sweet & Dangerous Scent] (Karaoke Version)"	3:38
5.	"Ride on Time (A cappella, Hidden Track)"	0:33
Total length:		16:32

=== Ride on Time ===
- Tatsuro Yamashita – Electric Guitar (Right), Kalimba, Percussion & Background Vocals
- Jun Aoyama – Drums
- Koki Ito – Bass
- Kazuo Shiina – Electric Guitar (Left)
- Hiroyuki Namba – Keyboards
- Hidefumi Toki – Alto Sax Solo
- Minako Yoshida – Background Vocals
- Shin Kazuhara – Trumpet
- Yoshikazu Kishi – Trumpet
- Shigeharu Mukai – Trombone
- Tadanori Konakawa – Trombone
- Takeru Muraoka – Tenor Sax
- Shunzo Sunahara – Baritone Sax

=== あまく危険な香り [Amaku Kiken na Kaori, Sweet & Dangerous Scent] ===
(from the 1982 single of the same name)

- Tatsuro Yamashita – Electric Guitar (Left), Acoustic Piano (Solo) & Percussion
- Jun Aoyama – Drums
- Koki Ito – Bass
- Tsunehide Matsuki – Electric Guitar (Right)
- Hiroyuki Namba – Keyboards
- Motoya Hamaguchi – Percussion
- Shin Kazuhara – Trumpet
- Masahiro Kobayashi – Trumpet
- Shigeharu Mukai – Trombone
- Tadanori Konakawa – Trombone
- Takeru Muraoka – Tenor Sax
- Shunzo Sunahara – Baritone Sax
- Tadaaki Ohno – Strings Concert Master
- Koji Hajima – Conductor
- Strings arranged by Masahide Sakuma

== Chart positions ==
=== Weekly charts ===
Year	Single	Chart	Position	Sales
1980	Ride on Time/Rainy Walk	Oricon Weekly Singles Chart	3	417,000
2003	Ride on Time/Amaku Kiken na Kaori	Oricon Weekly Singles Chart	13	77,000

=== Year-end charts ===
Year	Single	Chart	Position	Sales
1980	Ride on Time/Rainy Walk	Oricon Yearly Singles Chart (top 100)	25	417,000

== Release history ==
Country	Date	Label	Format	Catalog number
Japan	May 1, 1980	AIR/RVC	7" Single	AIR-503
Japan	February 19, 2003	AIR/BMG Funhouse	CD	BVCR-19604

== See also ==
- 1980 in Japanese music
