= Greatest Hits! of Tatsuro Yamashita =

Greatest hits album by Tatsuro Yamashita
- Released: July 21, 1982
- Genre: Rock; Pop
- Length: 52:48
- Label: AIR/RVC
- Producer: Tatsuro Yamashita

Tatsuro Yamashita chronology
For You (1982)	Greatest Hits! of Tatsuro Yamashita (1982)	Melodies (1983)

Greatest Hits! of Tatsuro Yamashita is the first greatest hits album by Japanese singer-songwriter Tatsuro Yamashita, released in July 1982.

== Overview ==
The album consists of Yamashita's songs mostly included on his previous six albums ranging from Circus Town to For You. The only song not included in any album is Amaku Kiken na Kaori which is only released as a single and a re-recording of Funky Flushin'. According to Yamashita, "Greatest Hits" is just a mundane joke that I thought of as a western music lover. The original album release (RAL-8803) included Yamashita's biography, discography, and various photographs in the form of a booklet.

== Lawsuit ==
In 1990, BMG Victor told Yamashita of its plans to release the album, and it asked Smile (Note: Smile Company (株式会社スマイルカンパニー) is a Japanese artist management company affiliated in some capacity with Ryuzo Kosugi.) to provide technical help for the project. Smile agreed, and in September 1990 the album was released (BVCR-2505) with the phrase "the only album authorized by Tatsuro Yamashita" displayed on the "obi strip". It was not until February 1991 that when Yamashita received a fan letter complaining that some songs of the album's 12 tracks were different from the previous versions. Claiming the record company had engaged in false advertising, Yamashita and his production company hired attorney Atsushi Naito, and in February 1991 they sent BMG Victor a cease and desist letter.

Changes in this release are:

- Amaku Kiken na Kaori was taken from the 1984 compilation album Come Along II and DJ Katsuya Kobayashi can be heard in the intro.
- Ride on Time was replaced from the single version to the album version.
- Funky Flushin' was taken from the studio album Moonglow.
- Bomber uses the sound taken from the 1980 compilation album Come Along and DJ Katsuya Kobayashi can once again be heard in the intro
- Solid Slider was replaced from the 3 min. version to the 7 min. version from Spacy
- Interlude B Part II from For You is included at the beginning before Your Eyes.

A settlement was made in 1995 and it was once collected from the store. All of those edits were fixed in the 1997 issue of the album (BVCR-1541) along with three bonus tracks.

== Track listing ==
All music is composed by Tatsuro Yamashita.

Side A
No.	Title	Lyrics	Length
1.	"Loveland, Island"	Tatsuro Yamashita	4:22
2.	"愛を描いて –Let's Kiss The Sun–"	Minako Yoshida	4:01
3.	"Amaku Kiken na Kaori"	Tatsuro Yamashita	3:20
4.	"Ride on Time"	Tatsuro Yamashita	4:22
5.	"夏への扉 (The Door Into Summer)"	Minako Yoshida	4:41
6.	"Funky Flushin'"	Minako Yoshida	5:07
Total length:			25:53

Side B
No.	Title	Lyrics	Length
1.	"Windy Lady"	Tatsuro Yamashita	5:21
2.	"Bomber"	Minako Yoshida	5:40
3.	"Solid Slider"	Minako Yoshida	3:31
4.	"Let's Dance Baby"	Osamu Yoshioka	4:48
5.	"潮騒 –The Whispering Sea–"	Minako Yoshida	4:21
6.	"Your Eyes"	Alan O'Day	3:14
Total length:			26:55

BVCR-1541 (Bonus tracks)
No.	Title	Lyrics	Length
1.	"Love Space"	Minako Yoshida	4:43
2.	"Sparkle"	Minako Yoshida	4:18
3.	"9 Minutes of Tatsuro Yamashita" ( (Note: Originally released on April 6, 1982 as a 12" promotional single of 700 copies. Consists of 13 tracks Loveland, Island; Funky Flushin'; Ride on Time; Sunshine; Silent Screamer; Let's Dance Baby; Eien no Full Moon; Bomber; Daydream; Sparkle; Solid Slider; Paper Doll; Someday.))	Various	8:46

== Personnel ==
Recording members

=== Loveland, Island ===
- Tatsuro Yamashita – Electric Guitar (Right) & Background Vocals
- Jun Aoyama – Drums
- Koki Ito – Bass
- Kazuo Shiina – Electric Guitar (Left)
- Hiroyuki Namba – Keyboards
- Hidefumi Toki – Alto Sax (Solo)
- Motoya Hamaguchi – Percussion
- Keiko Yamakawa – Harp

From the 1982 album "For You"

=== 愛を描いて –Let's Kiss The Sun– ===
- Tatsuro Yamashita – Electric Guitar (Right), Percussion & Background Vocals
- Yutaka Uehara – Drums
- Akihiro Tanaka – Bass
- Kazuo Shiina – Electric Guitar (Left)
- Hiroyuki Namba – Keyboards
- Minako Yoshida – Background Vocals
- Kazumi Takeda – Trumpet
- Shigeharu Mukai – Trombone
- Tadanori Konakawa – Trombone
- Takeru Muraoka – Tenor Sax
- Shunzo Sunahara – Baritone Sax

From the 1979 album "Moonglow", also released as a single.

=== Amaku Kiken na Kaori ===
- Tatsuro Yamashita – Electric Guitar (Left), Acoustic Piano (Solo) & Percussion
- Jun Aoyama – Drums
- Koki Ito – Bass
- Tsunehide Matsuki – Electric Guitar (Right)
- Hiroyuki Namba – Keyboards
- Motoya Hamaguchi – Percussion
- Shin Kazuhara – Trumpet
- Masahiro Kobayashi – Trumpet
- Shigeharu Mukai – Trombone
- Tadanori Konakawa – Trombone
- Takeru Muraoka – Tenor Sax
- Shunzo Sunahara – Baritone Sax
- Tadaaki Ohno – Strings Concert Master
- Koji Hajima – Conductor
- Strings arranged by Masahide Sakuma

Released only as a single.

=== Ride on Time ===
- Tatsuro Yamashita – Electric Guitar (Right), Percussion & Background Vocals
- Jun Aoyama – Drums
- Koki Ito – Bass
- Kazuo Shiina – Electric Guitar (Left)
- Hiroyuki Namba – Keyboards
- Hidefumi Toki – Alto Sax (Solo)
- Minako Yoshida – Background Vocals
- Shin Kazuhara – Trumpet
- Yoshihiro Nakagawa – Trumpet
- Shigeharu Mukai – Trombone
- Tadanori Konakawa – Trombone
- Takeru Muraoka – Tenor Sax
- Shunzo Sunahara – Baritone Sax

From the 1980 single "Ride on Time".

=== The Door into Summer ===
- Tatsuro Yamashita – Electric Guitar (Right), Clavinet, Percussion & Background Vocals
- Jun Aoyama – Drums
- Koki Ito – Bass
- Kazuo Shiina – Electric Guitar (Left)
- Hiroyuki Namba – Keyboards
- Kenji Nakazawa – Flugelhorn (Solo)
- Minako Yoshida – Background Vocals

From the 1980 album "Ride on Time".

=== Funky Flushin' ===
- Tatsuro Yamashita – Electric Guitar & Background Vocals
- Jun Aoyama – Drums
- Koki Ito – Bass
- Kazuo Shiina – Electric Guitar (Solo)
- Hiroyuki Namba – Keyboards
- Motoya Hamaguchi – Percussion (Timbales Solo)
- Shin Kazuhara – Trumpet
- Masahiro Kobayashi – Trumpet
- Shigeharu Mukai – Trombone
- Tadanori Konakawa – Trombone
- Takeru Muraoka – Tenor Sax
- Shunzo Sunahara – Baritone Sax

Re-recording, original mix from the album "Moonglow".

=== Windy Lady ===
- Allan Schwartzberg – Drums
- Will Lee – Bass
- John Tropea – Electric Guitar (Right)
- Jeff Mironov – Electric Guitar (Left)
- Pat Rebillot – Electric Piano
- Jimmy Maelen – Percussion
- Dave Samuels – Vibraphone
- George Young – Alto Sax (Solo)
- Randy Brecker – Trumpet
- Jon Faddis – Trumpet
- David Taylor – Trombone
- Wayne Andre – Trombone
- George Marge – Tenor Sax
- Romeo Penque – Baritone Sax
- Gene Orloff – Strings Concertmaster

From the 1976 album "Circus Town".

=== Bomber ===
- Tatsuro Yamashita – Electric Guitar & Percussion
- Yutaka Uehara – Drums
- Akihiro Tanaka – Bass
- Kazuo Shiina – Electric Guitar (Solo)
- Hiroyuki Namba – Keyboards
- Minako Yoshida – Background Vocals

From the 1978 album "Go Ahead!", rock drill SE at the beginning is removed in this album.

=== Solid Slider ===
- Tatsuro Yamashita – Electric Guitar
- Yutaka Uehara – Drums
- Akihiro Tanaka – Bass
- Ryuichi Sakamoto – Keyboards
- Kenji Ohmura – Electric Guitar (Solo)
- Nobu Saito – Percussion
- Minako Yoshida – Background Vocals
- Koji Hatori – Trumpet
- Shin Kazuhara – Trumpet
- Shigeharu Mukai – Trombone
- Tadanori Konakawa – Trombone
- Takeru Muraoka – Tenor Sax
- Shunzo Sunahara – Baritone Sax

From the 1977 album "Spacy".

=== Let's Dance Baby ===
- Tatsuro Yamashita – Electric Guitar (Right), Percussion, Background Vocals & Bang!
- Yutaka Uehara – Drums
- Akihiro Tanaka – Bass
- Kazuo Shiina – Electric Guitar (Left)
- Hiroyuki Namba – Keyboards
- Tomoo Okazaki – Alto Sax (Solo)
- Minako Yoshida – Background Vocals
- Ryuzo Kosugi – Background Vocals

From the album "Go Ahead!", also released as a single.

=== 潮騒 –The Whispering Sea– ===
- Tatsuro Yamashita – Electric Guitar (Solo), Percussion, Arp Bass, Percussion & Background Vocals
- Yutaka Uehara – Drums
- Hiroyuki Namba – Acoustic Piano
- Ryuichi Sakamoto – Synthesizer
- Chuei Yoshikawa – Acoustic Guitar
- Minako Yoshida – Background Vocals

From the album "Go Ahead!".

=== Your Eyes ===
- Tatsuro Yamashita – Electric Guitar, Electric Piano, Electric Sitar, Percussion & Background Vocals
- Jun Aoyama – Drums
- Koki Ito – Bass
- Kazuo Shiina – Electric Guitar
- Hiroyuki Namba – Keyboards
- Hidefumi Toki – Alto Sax (Solo)
- Chuei Yoshikawa – Acoustic Guitar
- Tadaaki Ohno – Strings Concertmaster
- Koji Hajima – Conductor
- Strings arranged by Hiroki Inui

From the album "For You".

Recording members (bonus tracks)

=== Love Space ===
- Shuichi Murakami – Drums
- Haruomi Hosono – Bass
- Tsunehide Matsuki – Electric Guitar
- Hiroshi Sato – Acoustic Piano
- Nobu Saito – Percussion
- Tomoo Okazaki – Alto Sax (Solo)
- Minako Yoshida – Background Vocals
- Tatsuro Yamashita – Background Vocals
- Tadaaki Ohno – Strings Concertmaster
- Hitoshi Yoshizawa – Conductor

From the album "Spacy".

=== Sparkle ===
- Tatsuro Yamashita – Electric Guitar, Percussion & Background Vocals
- Jun Aoyama – Drums
- Koki Ito – Bass
- Hiroyuki Namba – Keyboards
- Hidefumi Toki – Alto Sax (Solo)
- Minako Yoshida – Background Vocals
- Shin Kazuhara – Trumpet
- Masahiro Kobayashi – Trumpet
- Shigeharu Mukai – Trombone
- Tadanori Konakawa – Trombone
- Takeru Muraoka – Tenor Sax
- Shunzo Sunahara – Baritone Sax

From the album "For You".

== Chart positions ==
=== Weekly charts ===
Year	Country	Chart	Position	Sales
1982	Japan	Oricon Weekly LP Albums Chart	2	214,000
1982	Japan	Oricon Weekly CT Albums Chart	3	125,000
1997	Japan	Oricon Weekly Albums Chart	18	82,000

=== Year-end charts ===
Year	Country	Chart	Position	Sales
1982	Japan	Oricon Yearly Albums Chart	21	339,000

== Release history ==
Country	Date	Label	Format	Catalog number
Japan	July 21, 1982	AIR/RVC	LP	RAL-8803
Japan	July 21, 1982	AIR/RVC	CT	RAT-8803
Japan	May 21, 1984	AIR/RVC	CD	RACD-5
Japan	September 21, 1986	AIR/RVC	CD	R32A-1021
Japan	September 21, 1990	RCA/BMG Victor	CD	BVCR-2505
Japan	June 4, 1997	RCA/BMG Japan	CD	BVCR-1541

== See also ==
- 1982 in Japanese music
