= Shibugakitai =

Former Japanese boy band, active from 1982-1988

- Years active: 1982–1988
- Label: CBS/Sony
- Past members: Toshikazu Fukawa; Masahiro Motoki; Hirohide Yakumaru

Shibugakitai (The Cool Kid Trio) (シブがき隊) was a Japanese boy band active from 1982 to 1988, managed by (the then-named) Johnny & Associates. Toshikazu Fukawa (Fukkun), Masahiro Motoki (Mokkun), Hirohide Yakumaru (Yakkun) were the three members of the group.

== History ==
In 1981, Fukawa, Motoki and Yakumaru were appearing regularly as students on the TBS youth drama series 2-nen B-gumi Senpachi-sensei (a spinoff of the popular 3-nen B-gumi Kinpachi Sensei series). Their characters quickly proved to be very popular, and the trio had been given nicknames by viewers as "The Senpachi Trio" (仙八トリオ), "The Cool Trio" (シブいトリオ), and "The Brat Trio" (悪ガキトリオ). Later that year, following an announcement that the series was ending the following spring, Johnny Kitagawa (who had already been managing the trio as junior members) announced that he was debuting the trio as a formal group. Kitagawa formed their group name out a combination of their fan nicknames: the cool brat trio (シブい悪ガキトリオ, shibui warugaki torio), and replaced the "trio" part to the kanji for "team" (隊, tai), resulting with the name Shibugakitai (シブがき隊).

Senpachi-sensei ended on March 26, 1982. The group released their first single, "NAI・NAI 16", on May 5, 1982. Written by Daisuke Inoue, the single peaked at #3 on the Oricon chart and #4 on TBS's The Best Ten. Their following single, "100%...SO Kamo ne!" (100%…SOかもね！, 100%...Maybe That's So!), won them the Best New Act Award at the 24th Japan Record Awards. Their success in their debut year won them a chance to appear at The 33rd Kōhaku Uta Gassen.

Despite being a male act, Shibugakitai is also considered part of the "Flower Group of '82" (花の82年組, Hana no 82-nen gumi): a group of successful idol acts that all debuted in 1982 (which includes Akina Nakamori, Kyoko Koizumi, Yu Hayami, fellow Senpachi-sensei co-star Hiroko Mita, and others). The Flower Group of '82 were long mainstays on The Best Ten (and NTV's counterpart Uta no Top Ten), and the yearly televised Idol Swimming Tournaments (at the Oiso Long Beach Resort in Kanagawa) throughout their careers.

The group later released a string of top-ten hits, finding success in what the group called "novelty songs". These "novelty songs" were developed from ideas taken from Kitagawa's observation of foreign acts. Kitagawa reportedly sought inspiration from the French Japonisme art styles and blended them with other traditional Japanese religious, ninja, noh and kabuki essences to form the group's image and the themes of their songs during this period. "Zokkon Love" (ZOKKON 命, Instant Love), "Hey Bep-pin!" (Hey Sexy!), and "Katsu!" (喝!) were popular singles from this era in the group's timeline.

The most notorious of these "novelty songs", however, was their 18th Single "Sushi Kui Nee" (スシ食いねェ!, Let's Eat Sushi!). Released on February 1, 1986, the song was an ode to the itamae (traditional sushi chefs) and Japan's sushi bar culture, and featured a unique instrumentation. This single, however, only peaked at #10 on the Oricon chart and maxed at #12 on The Best Ten, and was the group's lowest performing single thus far. However, Johnny's was not accepting defeat on this effort and the single was immediately re-released as the group's 19th Single. Featuring the same exact instrumentation, the new version featured lyrics entirely in English and was renamed "OH! Sushi". However, the poor translation, added to the fact that neither member of the group had any proficiency in English whatsoever, did not bode well for the single. "OH! Sushi" did even worse on both the Oricon and The Best Ten charts (#17 and #20, respectively). The English version retains a cult following in Japan and English-speaking nations alike.

The group also began to see a decline in popularity starting as early as 1985 with the major debut fellow Johnny's group Shonentai, as well other popular male acts, such as Kōji Kikkawa and The Checkers. In 1987, yet another Johnny's group, Hikaru Genji, debuted and diverted even more attention away from Shibugakitai. Later that year, Shibugakitai was passed over for The 38th Kōhaku Uta Gassen in favor of Shonentai.

Although Motoki and Fukawa were willing to bear it out and try to co-exist with the newcomers, Yakumaru was strongly against forming relationships with them; aside from showing hostility towards the other acts (particularly Kikkawa), Yakumaru also began showing hostility towards Motoki and Fukawa for associating with their rivals. Relationships between the members soured as a result.

On August 7, 1988, the group announced at Tokyo Kōsei Nenkin Kaikan that they had made the decision to disband and to pursue solo careers. Later that year on November 2, 1988, they held their farewell concert at Yoyogi National Gymnasium.

== Members ==
Toshikazu Fukawa (布川敏和, born August 4, 1965, in Kawasaki, Kanagawa Prefecture) - Member Color: Red

Masahiro Motoki (本木雅弘, born December 21, 1965, in Okegawa, Saitama Prefecture) - Member Color: Yellow

Hirohide Yakumaru (薬丸裕英, born February 19, 1966, in Musashino, Tokyo Metropolis) - Member Color: Blue

== Post-Disbandment ==
Upon disbandment, all three members subsequently left Johnny's & Associates and began independent careers.

=== Toshikazu Fukawa ===
Fukawa married fellow-Flower Group of '82 member Kaori Tsuchiya in 1991 and had three children together. Their marriage ended in divorce in 2014, with both parties admittedly having been involved in extramarital affairs. Fukawa has not remarried since.

Fukawa remains active as a television personality, often invited to appear on variety shows.

Fukawa's first born son, Shunta Fukawa (born 1992), is an actor. Similarly to his father, Shunta's debut was in the Kinpachi-Sensei series, appearing in the program’s 8th Series in 2007. Fukawa's first born daughter, Momoka (born 1994) has also debuted as a model and television personality.

As of 2020, he is contracted to his son's production company: Fdce.

Fukawa became a grandfather (via his daughter, Momoka) in May 2021.

Fukawa's sister is former Onyanko Club member Tomoko Fukawa.

=== Masahiro Motoki ===
- See Masahiro Motoki for full details

=== Hirohide Yakumaru ===
Yakumaru transitioned into a successful solo career as an actor, author, and talk show host. From 1996 to 2014, he co-hosted the long-running TBS morning show Hanamaru Market alongside the late Kumiko Okae. As of 2024, he co-hosts TV Tokyo's Nanairo Biyori! alongside fellow former-idol Miyuki Kōsaka.

Yakumaru dated fellow Flower Group member Chiemi Hori around the time of the group's disbandment. Their relationship ended in 1989. On June 4, 1990, Yakumaru held a press conference announcing he had married Hidemi Ishikawa (also a member of the Flower Group). The couple announced that Ishikawa was eight months pregnant with their first child, and that they had kept the relationship a secret until she was far enough into the pregnancy to avoid any chance of their respective agencies' disapproval.

Yakumaru and Ishikawa moved to Honolulu, Hawaii and have a total of five children - amongst them, actor Sho Yakumaru (born 1990), footballer Hayato Yakumaru (born 1993), and actress Remi Yakumaru (born 1996). Yakumaru commutes often from Hawaii to Japan, while Ishikawa, who retired from show business after marriage, owns and operates a chain of jewelry stores in Waikiki.

Yakumaru became a grandfather (via his son, Sho) in January 2021.

== Major casting works ==
=== Film ===
- Come On Girls! (Shibugakitai Boys & Girls) (July 10, 1982)
- Third-Year High School Boys (December 18, 1982)
- Headphone Lullaby (July 10, 1983)
- Barrow Gang BC (April 27, 1985)

== Awards ==
Year	Award	Category	Nominee(s)	Result	Ref.
1982	13th Japan Music Awards	Best New Artist	"100%... SO Kamo ne!"	Won	
1982	24th Japan Record Awards	Best New Artist	"100%... SO Kamo ne!"	Won	
1982	24th Japan Record Awards	New Artist Award	"100%... SO Kamo ne!"	Won	
1983	25th Japan Record Awards	Golden Idol Award	"Zokkon Love"	Won	

Preceded by Masahiko Kondō	Japan Record Award for Best New Artist; 1982	Succeeded by The Good-Bye
