= Chinese restaurant (disambiguation) =

A Chinese restaurant is a food establishment serving Chinese cuisine. The term can also refer to:

- Restaurants in China
- Chinese restaurant syndrome, a fallacy purportedly caused by glutamate which occurs naturally in plants, meats and seafood
- Chinese restaurant process, a concept in probability theory
- Chinese Restaurant (TV series), a reality show
- "Chinese Restaurant", a song by Takako Mamiya from Love Trip
- "The Chinese Restaurant", a second-season episode of Seinfeld
- A Cantonese restaurant, popular in Hong Kong and southern China

== See also ==
- American Chinese cuisine
- Canadian Chinese cuisine
