= List of Oricon number-one singles of 1983 =

The highest-selling singles in Japan are ranked in the Oricon Singles Chart, which in 1983 was published in what was then called Oricon Weekly magazine. The data are compiled by Oricon based on each singles' physical sales. This list includes the singles that reached the number one place on that chart in 1983.

== Oricon Weekly Singles Chart ==
Issue date	Song	Artist(s)	Ref.
January 3	"3 Nenme no Uwaki"	Hiroshi & Kibo	
January 10	"3 Nenme no Uwaki"	Hiroshi & Kibo	
January 17	"Second Love"	Akina Nakamori	
January 24	"Second Love"	Akina Nakamori	
January 31	"Midnight Station"	Masahiko Kondō	
February 7	"Midnight Station"	Masahiko Kondō	
February 14	"Himitsu no Hanazono"	Seiko Matsuda	
February 21	"Himitsu no Hanazono"	Seiko Matsuda	
February 28	"Pierrot"	Toshihiko Tahara	
March 7	"½ no Shinwa"	Akina Nakamori	
March 14	"½ no Shinwa"	Akina Nakamori	
March 21	"½ no Shinwa"	Akina Nakamori	
March 28	"½ no Shinwa"	Akina Nakamori	
April 4	"½ no Shinwa"	Akina Nakamori	
April 11	"½ no Shinwa"	Akina Nakamori	
April 18	"Yagiri no Watashi"	Takashi Hosokawa	
April 25	"Yagiri no Watashi"	Takashi Hosokawa	
May 2	"Yagiri no Watashi"	Takashi Hosokawa	
May 9	"Manatsu no Ichibyo"	Masahiko Kondō	
May 16	"Tengoku no Kiss"	Seiko Matsuda	
May 23	"Megumi no Hito"	Rats & Star	
May 30	"Shower na Kibun"	Toshihiko Tahara	
June 6	"Tantei Monogatari / Sukoshi Dake Yasashiku"	Hiroko Yakushimaru	
June 13	"Tantei Monogatari / Sukoshi Dake Yasashiku"	Hiroko Yakushimaru	
June 20	"Tantei Monogatari / Sukoshi Dake Yasashiku"	Hiroko Yakushimaru	
June 27	"Tantei Monogatari / Sukoshi Dake Yasashiku"	Hiroko Yakushimaru	
July 4	"Tantei Monogatari / Sukoshi Dake Yasashiku"	Hiroko Yakushimaru	
July 11	"Tantei Monogatari / Sukoshi Dake Yasashiku"	Hiroko Yakushimaru	
July 18	"Tantei Monogatari / Sukoshi Dake Yasashiku"	Hiroko Yakushimaru	
July 25	"Tameiki Rockabilly"	Masahiko Kondō	
August 1	"Tameiki Rockabilly"	Masahiko Kondō	
August 8	"Tameiki Rockabilly"	Masahiko Kondō	
August 15	"Glass no Ringo / Sweet Memories"	Seiko Matsuda	
August 22	"Saraba... Natsu"	Toshihiko Tahara	
August 29	"Saraba... Natsu"	Toshihiko Tahara	
September 5	"Flashdance... What a Feeling"; Japanese title: (フラッシュダンス…ホワット・ア・フィーリング)	Irene Cara	
September 12	"Flashdance... What a Feeling"; Japanese title: (フラッシュダンス…ホワット・ア・フィーリング)	Irene Cara	
September 19	"Kinku"	Akina Nakamori	
September 26	"Cat's Eye"	Anri	
October 3	"Cat's Eye"	Anri	
October 10	"Cat's Eye"	Anri	
October 17	"Cat's Eye"	Anri	
October 24	"Cat's Eye"	Anri	
October 31	"Glass no Ringo / Sweet Memories"	Seiko Matsuda	
November 7	"Hitomi wa Diamond / Aoi Photograph"	Seiko Matsuda	
November 14	"Royal Straight Flash" (ロイヤル・ストレート・フラッシュ)	Masahiko Kondō	
November 21	"Hitomi wa Diamond / Aoi Photograph"	Seiko Matsuda	
November 28	"Loving"	Toshihiko Tahara	
December 5	"Loving"	Toshihiko Tahara	
December 12	"Loving"	Toshihiko Tahara	
December 19	"Love Is Over"	Ouyang Fei Fei	
December 26	"Love Is Over"	Ouyang Fei Fei	

== See also ==
- 1983 in Japanese music
