= Tomoko Naraoka =

Japanese actress and narrator (1929–2023)

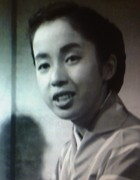
- Naraoka in Children of Hiroshima, 1952
- Born: December 1, 1929; Tokyo, Japan
- Died: March 23, 2023 (aged 93); Tokyo, Japan
- Occupation: Actress
- Years active: 1948–2023

Tomoko Naraoka (奈良岡 朋子, Naraoka Tomoko; December 1, 1929 – March 23, 2023) was a Japanese actress and narrator. The daughter of a painter, she was born in Komagome, Hongō (present-day Bunkyo), in the city of Tokyo, Japan. She graduated from Joshibi University of Art and Design.

Naraoka debuted as a cinema actress in the 1949 film Chijin no Ai, based on the novel Naomi. In 1981 she appeared in Rengō Kantai (lit. "Combined Fleet", United States title: The Imperial Navy). She also appeared in Tora-san's Salad-Day Memorial (a 1988 movie in the long-running Otoko wa Tsurai yo series) as well as eight films in the Tsuribaka Nisshi series. Naraoka has appeared in several NHK Taiga dramas. Her first was the 1969 Ten to Chi to, in the role of the wife of Uesugi Sadazane. She portrayed Kita no Mandokoro (the wife of Toyotomi Hideyoshi) in Haru no Sakamichi (1971). Her next Taiga drama appearance was in 1976 in Kaze to Kumo to Niji to. She narrated the 1986 Inochi and 1989 Kasuga no Tsubone. She is the narrator of the 2008 drama Atsuhime. Other noteworthy narration roles include the 1983 serialized morning television drama Oshin. She also narrated Onna wa Dokyō (1992) and Haru Yo Koi (1994–1995). A nonfiction voice role was in the series Kiwameru: Nihon no Bi to Kokoro.

Naraoka died from pneumonia on March 23, 2023, at the age of 93.

== Filmography ==
=== Film ===
(Partial list)

- Chijin no Ai (1949)
- Wolf (1955)
- Night Drum (1958)
- Chibideka monogatari (Skinny and Fatty) (1958)
- Ballad of the Cart (1959)
- The Scent of Incense (1964)
- Ballad of Orin (1977)
- The Imperial Navy (1981)
- Haru no Kane (1985) – Katsuko Naganuma
- Tora-san's Salad-Day Memorial (1988)
- Ruten no umi (1990)
- My Sons (1991)
- Poppoya (1999) – Mune Katō
- Ponyo on the Cliff by the Sea (2008) – Yoshie (voice)
- Railways (2010) – Kinyo
- Takatsu-gawa (2022) – Kinue Saitō
- The Zen Diary (2022) – Chie

=== Television ===
- Ten to Chi to (1969)
- Haru no Sakamichi (1971) – Kōdai-in
- Oshin (1983–84) – Narrator
- Inochi (1986) – Narrator
- Taiyō ni Hoero! Part 2 (1986) – Asako Takamura
- Kasuga no Tsubone (1989) – Narrator
- Onna wa Dokyō (1992) – Narrator
- Haru yo, koi (1994–95) – Narrator
- Atsuhime (2008) – Narrator
- Gō (2011) – Ōmandokoro
- Nankyoku Tairiku (2011) – Narrator

=== Theater ===
- Driving Miss Daisy (2005) – Daisy Werthan

== Honours ==
- Medal with Purple Ribbon (1992)
- Order of the Rising Sun, 4th Class, Gold Rays with Rosette (2000)
