= Sadazane =

- Gender: Male

Origin
- Origin: Japanese
- Meaning: Different meanings depending on the kanji used

Sadazane (written: 定実) is a masculine Japanese given name. Notable people with the name include:

- Fujiwara no Sadazane (藤原 定実; 1076–1120), Japanese calligrapher
- Uesugi Sadazane (上杉 定実; 1478–1550), Japanese samurai and daimyō
