= Kansuigyo =

Studio album by Miyuki Nakajima
- Released: March 21, 1982
- Recorded: Hitokuchizaka and Epicurus Studios
- Genre: Folk / Kayōkyoku
- Length: 48:28
- Label: Canyon Records/AARD-VARK
- Producer: Miyuki Nakajima

Miyuki Nakajima chronology
Month of Parturition (Ringetsu) (1981)	Kansuigyo (1982)	Hunch (Yokan) (1983)

Kansuigyo (寒水魚) is the ninth studio album by Japanese singer-songwriter Miyuki Nakajima, released in March 1982. The term "Kansuigyo", which means opposite of "Nettaigyo" (熱帯魚, tropical fish), is Nakajima's neologism.

Five months before the album came out, she produced a hit single "Bad Girl (Akujo)", which became her first chart topper since "Wakareuta (The Parting Song)" in 1977. The song became one of the most commercially successful single of that year, reaching the top-10 on the year-end chart of 1982. In the following year, Sylvie Vartan covered the song in French-translated lyrics on her Danse ta vie album, under the alternative title "Ta vie de chien".

Kansuigyo begin with another interpretation of above-mentioned successful song, which features more rock-oriented arrangement and her listless vocals. Rest of the album mainly consists of the ballads that used strings effectively . "Utahime (Diva)", 8-minute-long track included at the end of the album has been one of her fan favorites and also included on her later "greatest hits". Lyrics of "Keisha (The Incline)", the song which described melancholy of a solitary elderly woman who are walking on steep slope, was evaluated literarily and had been listed in a textbook on the Japanese language around the 1990s. When Nakajima recorded the Ima no Kimochi album that were constituted by new interpretations of the past materials in 2004, those two songs were picked out from Kansuigyo.

The album spent the number-one spot on the Japanese Oricon chart for six-week, and became the country's best-selling LP of that year. It has also been her album that gained biggest commercial success to date, eventually selling about 770,000 units.

== Track listing ==
All songs written and composed by Miyuki Nakajima.

=== Side one ===
All songs arranged by Nozomi Aoki (except "Bad Girl" and "The Incline" arranged by Tsugutoshi Goto)

1. "Bad Girl (悪女, Akujo)"[Album Version] – 5:12
2. "The Incline (傾斜, Keisha)" – 6:00
3. "Tori ni Natte (鳥になって)" – 5:19
4. "Suteruhodo no Ai de Iikara (捨てるほどの愛でいいから)" – 6:41

=== Side two ===
All songs arranged by Nozomi Aoki (except "B.G.M." arranged by Masataka Matsutoya)

1. "B.G.M." – 3:51
2. "Iede (家出)" – 3:58
3. "Jikokuhyou (時刻表)" – 5:30
4. "Suna no Fune (砂の船)" – 3:53
5. "Diva (歌姫, Utahime)" – 8:12

== Personnel ==
=== Band ===
- Miyuki Nakajima – vocals
- Masaki Matsubara – electric guitar
- Tsuyoshi Kon – electric guitar
- Fujimal Yoshino – electric guitar, acoustic guitar
- Chuei Yoshikawa – acoustic guitar
- Toishiaki Usui – acoustic guitar
- Nobuo Kurata – keyboards
- Hiroshi Shibui – keyboards
- Masataka Matsutoya – keyboards
- Tsugutoshi Goto – bass guitar
- Yasuo Tomikura – bass guitar
- Kenji Takamizu – bass guitar
- Akira Okazawa – bass guitar
- Michio Nagaoka – bass guitar
- Nobu Saito – percussion
- Minoru Ishiyama – percussion
- Motoya Hamaguchi – percussion
- Naoki Yamamoto – percussion
- Tatsuo Hayashi – drums
- Jun Morikawa – drums
- Yuichi Tokashiki – drums
- Hideo Yamaki – drums

=== Additional personnel ===
- Fujisawa Group – strings
- Tomato Strings Unsemble – strings
- Tomoda etc. – strings
- Yasuo Mito etc. – sStrings
- Isao Kaneyama – malimba, vibra glocken
- Masakazu Ishibashi – oboe
- Sakae Yamada etc. – horns
- Yasuo Hirauchi- trombone
- Isamu Mita- trombone
- Sumio Okada – trombone
- Eiji Arai – trombone
- Shuhei Hisayasu – tuba
- Keiko Yamakawa – harp
- Mikiko Imamichi – harp

== Production ==
- Composer, writer, Producer and Performer: Miyuki Nakajima
- Arranger:Nozomi Aoki, Tsugutoshi Gotoh, Masataka Matsutoya
- Remix Engineer: Shozo Inomata
- Photographer and Art Director: Jin Tamura
- Designer: Hirofumi Arai
- Costume: Kazumi Yamase
- Artist Management: Hiroshi Kojima, Kunio Kaneko
- General Producer: Genichi Kawakami
- Special Thanks to Satoru Ide, Kaname Terazaki, Gil House People

== Awards ==
Japan Record Awards
Year	Title	Category	Winner
1982 (24th)	Kansuigyo	Best Albums	Miyuki Nakajima
1982 (24th)	Kansuigyo	'82 Albums Best 10	Miyuki Nakajima

== Chart positions ==
Year	Album	Country	Chart	Position	Weeks	Sales
1982	Kansuigyo	Japan	Oricon Weekly LP Albums Chart (top 100)	1	43	773,000
1982	Kansuigyo	Japan	Oricon Weekly CT Albums Chart (top 100)	1	31	773,000

== Release history ==
Country	Date	Label	Format	Catalog number
Japan	March 21, 1982	Canyon Records	LP	C28A-0208
Japan	March 21, 1982	Pony	Audio cassette	28P-6141
Japan	September 1, 1983	Canyon Records	CD	D35A-0008
Japan	November 5, 1986	Canyon Records	CD	D32A-0228
Japan	March 21, 1989	Pony Canyon	CD	D35A-0461
Japan	May 21, 1990	Pony Canyon	CD	PCCA-00078
Japan	April 18, 2001	Yamaha Music Communications	CD	YCCW-00012
Japan	October 1, 2008	Yamaha Music Communications	CD	YCCW-10061

== See also ==
- 1982 in Japanese music

Preceded by We Are (Off Course); Mizu no Naka no Asia e (Yumi Matsutoya); A Long Vacation (Eiichi Ohtaki)	Japan Record Award for the Best Album; 1982	Succeeded by Kirei (Southern All Stars); Utopia (Seiko Matsuda); Reincarnation (Yumi Matsutoya)
