= 1982 in Japanese music =

In 1982 (Shōwa 57), Japanese music was released on records and performed in concerts, and there were charts, awards, contests and festivals.

During that year, Japan continued to have the second largest music market in the world, and the second largest market for jazz musicians, and the value of tapes and records made there was $1.195 billion.

== Awards, contests, festivals and forums ==
The 11th Tokyo Music Festival was held on 28 March 1982. The 24th Osaka International Festival (Japanese: 大阪国際フェスティバル) was held from 9 to 26 April 1982. The 23rd Yamaha Popular Song Contest was held on 16 May 1982. The 24th Yamaha Popular Song Contest was held on 3 October 1982. The 13th World Popular Song Festival was held from 29 to 31 October 1982. The final of the 11th FNS Music Festival was held on 21 December 1982. The 24th Japan Record Awards were held on 31 December 1982. The 33rd NHK Kōhaku Uta Gassen was held on 31 December 1982.

An Asian Music Forum was held in the Hibiya Public Hall and broadcast on JOQR.

== Concerts ==
A Shinji Tanimura and Masashi Sada concert was held on 12 August 1982.

== Number one singles ==
The following reached number 1 on the weekly Oricon Singles Chart:

Issue date	Song	Artist(s)
4 January	"Sailor Fuku to Kikanjū"	Hiroko Yakushimaru
11 January	"Sailor Fuku to Kikanjū"	Hiroko Yakushimaru
18 January	"Sailor Fuku to Kikanjū"	Hiroko Yakushimaru
25 January	"Jōnetsu Neppū Serenade"	Masahiko Kondō
1 February	"Jōnetsu Neppū Serenade"	Masahiko Kondō
8 February	"Akai Sweet Pea"	Seiko Matsuda
15 February	"Akai Sweet Pea"	Seiko Matsuda
22 February	"Akai Sweet Pea"	Seiko Matsuda
1 March	"Kokoro no Iro"	Masatoshi Nakamura
8 March	"Kokoro no Iro"	Masatoshi Nakamura
15 March	"Kokoro no Iro"	Masatoshi Nakamura
22 March	"Kokoro no Iro"	Masatoshi Nakamura
29 March	"Kokoro no Iro"	Masatoshi Nakamura
5 April	"Ikenai Rouge Magic"	Kiyoshiro Imawano & Ryuichi Sakamoto
12 April	"Furarete Banzai"	Masahiko Kondō
19 April	"Furarete Banzai"	Masahiko Kondō
26 April	"Furarete Banzai"	Masahiko Kondō
3 May	"Furarete Banzai"	Masahiko Kondō
10 May	"Nagisa no Balcony"	Seiko Matsuda
17 May	"Harajuku Kiss"	Toshihiko Tahara
24 May	"Harajuku Kiss"	Toshihiko Tahara
31 May	"Harajuku Kiss"	Toshihiko Tahara
7 June	"Madonna-tachi no Lullaby"	Hiromi Iwasaki
14 June	"Madonna-tachi no Lullaby"	Hiromi Iwasaki
21 June	"Madonna-tachi no Lullaby"	Hiromi Iwasaki
28 June	"Madonna-tachi no Lullaby"	Hiromi Iwasaki
5 July	"Hyakuman Dollar Baby"	Johnny
12 July	"Highteen Boogie"	Masahiko Kondō
19 July	"Highteen Boogie"	Masahiko Kondō
26 July	"Highteen Boogie"	Masahiko Kondō
2 August	"Highteen Boogie"	Masahiko Kondō
9 August	"Highteen Boogie"	Masahiko Kondō
16 August	"Komugi Iro no Mermaid"	Seiko Matsuda
23 August	"Kurayami wo Buttobase" (暗闇をぶっとばせ)	Daisuke Shima
30 August	"Matsu wa"	Aming
6 September	"Matsu wa"	Aming
13 September	"Matsu wa"	Aming
20 September	"Matsu wa"	Aming
27 September	"Matsu wa"	Aming
4 October	"Matsu wa"	Aming
11 October	"Horeta ze! Kanpai"	Masahiko Kondō
18 October	"Horeta ze! Kanpai"	Masahiko Kondō
25 October	"Yūwaku Suresure"	Toshihiko Tahara
1 November	"Yūwaku Suresure"	Toshihiko Tahara
8 November	"Nobara no Etude"	Seiko Matsuda
15 November	"Nobara no Etude"	Seiko Matsuda
22 November	"Nobara no Etude"	Seiko Matsuda
29 November	"Second Love"	Akina Nakamori
6 December	"Second Love"	Akina Nakamori
13 December	"Second Love"	Akina Nakamori
20 December	"3 Nenme no Uwaki"	Hiroshi & Kibo
27 December	"3 Nenme no Uwaki"	Hiroshi & Kibo

== Number one albums and LPs ==
Oricon

The following reached number 1 on the Oricon chart:

- 26 April: Kansuigyo - Miyuki Nakajima
- 5 July: Pearl Pierce - Yumi Matsutoya
- 12 July: I Love You - Off Course
- 27 September: Saudade - Masayoshi Takanaka

Music Labo

The following reached number 1 on the Music Labo chart:

- 4 January and 18 January: Over - Off Course
- 11 January: Kishoutenketsu II - Chiharu Matsuyama
- 25 January and 1 February: Sailor Fuku To Kikan Ju (original soundtrack of Sailor Suit and Machine Gun) - Hiroko Yakushimaru
- 8 February, 15 February, 22 February and 27 February: For You - Tatsuro Yamashita
- 6 March: Watashikara No Tegami - Chiharu Matsuyama
- 16 March, 23 March and 30 March: Memorial - Masatoshi Nakamura
- 5 April, 12 April, 19 April, 26 April, 3 May, 10 May, 17 May and 24 May: Kansuigyo - Miyuki Nakajima
- 31 May: Tug of War - Paul McCartney
- 3 June, 12 June and 28 June: Pineapple - Seiko Matsuda
- 5 July and 12 July: Pearl Pierce - Yumi Matsutoya
- 15 July, 26 July and 2 August: I Love You - Off Course
- 9 August, 16 August, 23 August, 30 August, 6 September, 13 September and 27 September: Nude Man - Southern All Stars
- 20 September: Best - Toshihiko Tahara
- 4 October, 11 October, 18 October, 25 October and 1 November: Next Sound Track - Off Course
- 8 November and 15 November: Variation - Akina Nakamori
- 22 November, 29 November and 12 December: Candy - Seiko Matsuda
- 6 December: Stage - Chiharu Matsuyama
- 20 December: Kin-Irono Ribbon - Seiko Matsuda

Cash Box of Japan

The following reached number 1 on the Cash Box of Japan chart:

- 9 January and 23 January: Over - Off Course
- 13 March and 27 March: For You - Tatsuro Yamashita
- 3 April and 17 April: Memorial - Masatoshi Nakamura
- 8 May: Kansuigyo - Miyuki Nakajima
- 3 July and 24 July: Pineapple - Seiko Matsuda
- 31 July: Pearl Pierce - Yumi Matsutoya
- 21 August: P.M.9 - Eikichi Yazawa
- 4 September, 18 September, 2 October and 23 October: Nude Man - Southern All Stars
- 13 November and 20 November: Next Sound Track - Off Course
- 18 December: Candy - Seiko Matsuda

== Annual charts ==
Aming's Matsu wa was number 1 in the Oricon annual singles chart.

== Jazz ==
There were approximately one hundred jazz bands.

== Idols ==
There is a group of idols known as "Hana No 82-nen Gumi" (Japanese: 花の82年組) (English: "Flower Group of '82"). This group includes certain idols, such as Akina Nakamori, Chiemi Hori, Hidemi Ishikawa, Hiroko Mita, Kaoruko Arai, Kyoko Koizumi, Sawako Kitahara, Sayaka Ito, Tomoyo Harada and Yu Hayami, who debuted in 1982. It also includes Iyo Matsumoto, who debuted towards the end of 1981.

== Film and television ==
The music of The Go Masters, by Hikaru Hayashi, won the 37th Mainichi Film Award for Best Music. The music of Fall Guy (1982), by Masato Kai, won the 6th Japan Academy Film Prize for Best Music (awarded in 1983). The music of The Wizard of Oz is by Joe Hisaishi and includes songs by Mitsuko Horie.

== Overseas ==
The song "Bamboo Houses", by Ryuichi Sakamoto and David Sylvian, reached number 30 on the UK singles chart.

== Debuts ==
- 19 March: Sawako Kitahara
- 21 March: Kaoruko Arai
- 21 April: Hidemi Ishikawa
- 21 May: Singing debut of Sayaka Ito

== Other singles released ==
- "Slow Motion" and Shōjo A by Akina Nakamori
- "Negai" by Saki Kubota
- "Amaku Kiken na Kaori" by Tatsuro Yamashita
- "Irotsuki No Onna De Itekureyo" by The Tigers.

== Other albums released ==
- Prologue (Jomaku) by Akina Nakamori
- Mie Live and Call Girl by Mie
- Hitori ga Suki by Keiko Masuda
- Mishiranu Hito Denaku by Saki Kubota
- What, Me Worry? by Yukihiro Takahashi
- Greatest Hits! of Tatsuro Yamashita by Tatsuro Yamashita
- Lion & Pelican by Yōsui Inoue
- Mint Jams and 4x4 by Casiopea
- Perspective by P-Model
- Devil Soldier by Loudness
- Temptation of Shapely Legs by T-Square
- Music for Nine Post Cards by Hiroshi Yoshimura
- Love Trip by Takako Mamiya

== History ==
The song Ukiuki Watching (Japanese: ウキウキWATCHING), the theme song of Waratte Iitomo!, was first broadcast on 4 October 1982.

== See also ==
- Timeline of Japanese music
- 1982 in Japan
- 1982 in music
- w:ja:1982年の音楽
