= DT Eightron =

Japanese anime television series

- DTエイトロン
- Genre: Adventure, Science fiction
- Created by: Team Eightron
- Written by: Hideki Kakinuma
- Directed by: Tetsurō Amino
- Music by: Hiroyuki Namba
- Country of origin: Japan
- Original language: Japanese
- No. of episodes: 26

Production
- Producers: Kōji Ishii; Mikihiro Iwata; Ryōta Wakanabe
- Production companies: Fuji Television; Sunrise

Original release
- Network: Fuji Television
- Release: May 18 – November 6, 1998

Related
- Manga
- Written by: Iderou Hinoki
- Published by: Fujimi Shobo
- Magazine: Monthly Comic Dragon
- Original run: July 1999 – January 2000
- Volumes: 1

DT Eightron (DTエイトロン, Dī Tī Eitoron) is a 26 episode anime series produced by Sunrise and Fuji TV. It was directed by Tetsurō Amino, with Hideki Kakinuma handling series scripts, Yoshi Ichida and Ryō Tanaka designing the characters, Junya Ishigaki and Shinobu Tsuneki designing the mechanical elements and Hiroyuki Namba composing the music. In 1999, it was adapted in a manga series written and illustrated by Iderou Hinoki.

== Story ==
In the year 2187, on the planet Earth, human civilization is being led to certain destruction caused by global warming. As such people are unable to live on the Earth's surface so they create domed cities, but as time goes by, war and unstable land conditions separate the domes and they lose contact with each other. Shu is a teenage boy from Datania, a school-type city dome controlled by Zero, a data program. With the help of his human assistant Nines, and later Berk, they force the children who live there to live and work as programmed drones using the reset system, which results in the children having no emotions, needs, or human instinct. The series begins when Shu, who dreams of seeing the ocean, escapes with his friends from Datania with the help from, Ein, May, and Dolly from The Returners, rebels of Datania who live underground. Shu goes with the Returners to find Amaroute, another dome city which they believe to be the better place to live. Along the journey, Shu explores the world he has never seen before, and joins the Returners in fighting Zero and his men who are after DT, a special substance inside humans, which Shu and his Returner friends have. Arriving in Amaroute, the Returners discover that Amaroute is the same as Datania, and likewise, it is controlled by Zero, but assisted this time, by a clone of Shu. Shu then learns the purpose of Datania and Amaroute is for each to create a rocket that will transport Zero safely in to orbit before a generator that has been preventing global flooding breaks down due to neglect and the world is flooded in a huge tidal wave. After Amaroute falls, Shu and his friends return to Datania to defeat Zero and save both its citizens and the rest of the runners. The Rocket there cannot be completed in time, but Shu has the idea they instead turn it in to an Ark and ride out the flood before the tidal wave hits. Work is complete and everyone is loaded aboard, but a technical fault prevents it from being launched just as the generator preventing the flood finally breaks down, forcing Shu and his friends to work against the clock to free it. In a shock twist, the tidal wave strikes before the Ark is seen being released, leaving the fate of Shu and everyone on board uncertain to the viewer.

== Characters ==
Shu (シュウ)
Voiced by: Sōichirō Hoshi
Shu is the protagonist of the story. He is a fourteen year old boy raised in Datania (a country where young children and adolescent teens are forced into slave labor), who one day escapes the dome of his home country and joins the Returners.
Dolly (ドリー)
Voiced by: Akiko Yajima
A cheerful 8 year old African boy hacker and one of the Returners. He can call upon Eightron for whenever he and his friends are in immediate danger.
May (メイ)
Voiced by: Rio Natsuki
A 15 year old girl and one of the Returners. She often looks after Shu like an older sibling.
Fear (フイア)
Voiced by: Ayako Kawasumi
A fourteen year old girl who escapes Datania along with her friend Shu. It is revealed that she is a spy for Nines. But after he betrays her, she sticks with Shu and the Returners. Her lack of DT however, means she can not continue with them on their journey. And must remain in the care of nomads living within a large mobile land craft. She is the only confirmed survivor after the tidal wave strikes.
Ein (アイン)
Voiced by: Junichi Suwabe
A seventeen year old teenage boy and one of the Returners.
Nines (ナインツ)
Voiced by: Kōji Tsujitani
A GAF commander in Datania.
Rosso (ロッソ)
Voiced by: Nobutoshi Hayashi
A survivor from the Dome 13. He always carries a firearm.
Roady (ローディ)
Voiced by: Toshiyuki Morikawa
The former leader of the Returners.
Eightron (エイトロン)
A powerful and mysterious entity that is often summoned by Dolly when the Returners get into trouble.
