= Matsu wa =

Single by Aming

from the album P.S. Anata e...
- B-side: "Michishirube"
- Released: July 21, 1982
- Genre: Kayōkyoku
- Length: 4:24
- Label: Philips Records
- Songwriter: Takako Okamura

Aming singles chronology
"Matsu wa" (1982)	"Kohaku Iro no Omoide" (1982)

Audio video
- "Matsu wa" on YouTube

"Matsu wa" (待つわ; lit. "I'll Wait") is the debut single by Aming released on July 21, 1982 in Japan.

The single reached number 1 on the Oricon Singles Chart and remained in the chart for 29 weeks.

== Track list ==
1. "Matsu wa" (待つわ) (4:24)
2. "Michishirube" (未知標 (みちしるべ)) (4:35)

== Personnel ==
- Songwriter: Takako Okamura
- Arranger: Mitsuo Hagita

== Covers ==
- The song has been covered by former idol group W (Double You) for their first album Duo U&U.
- It had also been covered in Mandarin by Chinese singer Cheng Fangyuan (Traditional Chinese: 成方圓; Simplified Chinese: 成方圆) under the title "In the Summer" (Traditional Chinese: 在夏季裡; Simplified Chinese: 在夏季里).

== See also ==
- 1982 in Japanese music
