= Love Trip (Takako Mamiya album) =

1982 album

Studio album by Takako Mamiya
- Released: 25 November 1982
- Recorded: 13 April to 28 August 1982
- Studio: KRS Studio, Tokyo
- Genre: City pop
- Length: 42:20
- Label: Kitty Records
- Producer: Genji Sawai

Singles from Love Trip
- 1. "Love Trip" / "One More Night" Released: 1982

Love Trip is the only album by Japanese singer Takako Mamiya (間宮 貴子, Mamiya Takako). It was released in 1982 by Kitty Records. Since the turn of the 21st century, critics have re-evaluated the album as an important part of city pop.

== Production ==
Love Trip was released by Kitty Records on 25 November 1982. It was the only album released by Mamiya, who was previously part of Pao (alongside Sabine Kaneko and Yoshikazu Miura), a choral trio who released one single, "Yes (Say Yes)", through Eastworld in December 1978. There are ten songs in the album, with five on each side. Most of the songs were written by Etsuko Kisugi and Yoshiko Miura, with Gregg Oldron and Ichiko Takehana writing one each. Akira Inoue, Mitsuru Kanekuni, Takao Kisugi, Katz Hoshi, Hiroyuki Namba, and Kazuo Shiina composed tracks for the album, while Osamu Shiomura joined some of the composers in arranging the music.

Love Trip was recorded at KRS Studio in Tokyo from 13 April to 28 August 1982. Genji Sawai produced the album, while Kitty Group founder Hidenori Taga was executive producer. Principal musicians included Hiroyuki Namba, Yoshihiro Naruse, Kazuo Shiina, Osamu Shiomura, and Yutaka Uehara, and several of the instrumental performers had worked with Tatsuro Yamashita, as did Shiina himself. FM Odawara personality Eiji Sawai said that there is no information about the album beyond the album recording and its credits, requiring assumptions to be made about its production.

Additionally, Mamiya released a single for the titular track the same year as the album, with "One More Night" as the B-side.

== Reception and legacy ==
Ynes Sarah Filleul of Tokyo Weekender noted that some of tracks, specifically the titular one and "Mayonaka no Joke", "oozed an aura of sultry, urban sophistication mixed with ennui." Writing for Reminder, Sawai praised the album as "a tasteful work that eschews any hint of pop music", also adding that "the sound intertwines with Mamiya's vocals for a truly exquisite performance". Yile Lin of Mezamashi Media said of the album: "Even if she could only make one album in her lifetime, if she could create such a perfect album, I think that would be fine".

=== Rediscovery by the city pop scene ===
At the time of its initial release, Love Trip did not reach mainstream popularity or gain widespread attention, nor did it accumulate a high position on the Oricon Charts. Mamiya never released another album or single, and she retired from music after her marriage. Little information is known about Mamiya, with Filleul calling her "something of a mystery in city pop lore" and reporting that fans are still looking.

Decades after its initial release, Love Trip came in high demand due to the rise of the city pop trend, with "Mayonaka no Joke" becoming popular among DJs interested in Japanese music. The album is considered a cult classic, with Kayo Pops Channel noting that it "has become widely known as a symbolic rediscovery of the re-evaluation of city pop", citing the "urbanist-infused music and Mamiya's ennui-filled personality". Sawai called "Mayonaka no Joke" worthy of being called the "model of city pop". Kayo Pops Channel ranked the title track #49 on the 1980s ranking of the Top 100 City Pop Hits of the 70s and 80s.

== Re-releases ==
On 26 December 2012, Tower Records released an exclusive digitally remastered re-release of Love Trip; it was the first time the album received a release since the 1982 original. In 2014, Love Trip received a second re-release but with only 500 copies pressed; it sold out shortly after release and reportedly sold at auctions for high prices. A third re-release was released in August 2019.

The album saw two more vinyl re-releases, in August 2020 and August 2021 (the latter a deluxe edition), as well as on coloured vinyl: pink in August 2023 and clear sky blue in April 2024. It was also released on Super Audio CD and cassette tape on two separate occasions in 2022.

== Track listing ==
Track lengths are cited from Apple Music, and the rest of the information is cited from the album's liner notes and center label.

Side one
No.	Title	Lyrics	Music	Arrangement	Length
1.	"Love Trip"	Etsuko Kisugi	Kazuo Shiina	Shiina	4:00
2.	"Chinese Restaurant" (チャイニーズ･レストラン)	Yoshiko Miura; Ichiko Takehana	Katz Hoshi	Hoshi	3:52
3.	"Mayonaka no Joke" (真夜中のジョーク)	Ichiko Takehana	Hiroyuki Namba	Genji Sawai; Osamu Shiomura	4:52
4.	"Kanashimi wa Yoru no Mukō" (哀しみは夜の向こう)	Miura	Mitsuru Kanekuni	Shiina; Shiomura	4:05
5.	"All or Nothing"	E. Kisugi	Hoshi	Shiina	4:23
Total length:					21:12

Side two
No.	Title	Lyrics	Music	Arrangement	Length
1.	"Nagisa de Dance" (渚でダンス)	Miura	Namba	Sawai; Shiomura	4:18
2.	"One More Night"	E. Kisugi	Takao Kisugi	Sawai; Shiomura	4:02
3.	"Morning Flight" (モーニング･フライト)	Miura	Sawai	Sawai; Shiomura	4:09
4.	"Tasogare wa Ginpaku no…" (たそがれは銀箔の･･･)	E. Kisugi	Akira Inoue	Inoue	4:27
5.	"What a Broken Heart Can Do"	Gregg Oldron	Shiina	Shiina	4:12
Total length:					21:08

== Personnel ==
Credits adapted from 2012 re-release.

- Toshio Araki – brass (principal; part of Bikkuri Hourns)
- Yukio Etoh – flute
- Tetsuaki Hoashi – Latin percussion (principal)
- Katz Hoshi – chorus
- Akira Inoue – keyboard
- Mitsuru Kanekuni – brass (principal; part of Bikkuri Hourns)
- Shigeru Kawashima – brass (principal; part of Bikkuri Hourns)
- Shin Kazuhara – brass
- Masato Matsuda – chorus
- Tsunehide Matsuki – electric guitar
- Shigeharu Mukai – brass
- Hiroshi Narumi – chorus
- Hiroyuki Namba – keyboard (principal)
- Mitsuo Nagai – electric guitar
- Yoshihiro Naruse – electric bass (principal)
- Ohno Group – strings
- Hitoshi Okano – brass (principal; part of Bikkuri Hourns)
- Genji Sawai – brass (principal; part of Bikkuri Hourns)
- Kazuo Shiina – electric guitar (principal)
- Osamu Shiomura – brass (principal; part of Bikkuri Hourns)
- Mitsuru Soma – flute
- Satoshi Tamaki – chorus
- Yutaka Uehara – drums (principal)
- Etsuko Yamakawa – chorus
- Tatsuji Yokoyama – Latin percussion (principal)
