= Tora-san's Salad-Day Memorial =

- Theatrical poster
- Directed by: Yoji Yamada
- Written by: Yoji Yamada; Yoshitaka Asama
- Starring: Kiyoshi Atsumi; Yoshiko Mita
- Cinematography: Tetsuo Takaba
- Edited by: Iwao Ishii
- Music by: Naozumi Yamamoto
- Distributed by: Shochiku
- Release date: December 24, 1988
- Running time: 100 minutes
- Country: Japan
- Language: Japanese

Tora-san's Salad-Day Memorial (男はつらいよ 寅次郎サラダ記念日, Otoko wa Tsurai yo: Torajirō Sarada Kinenbi) is a 1988 Japanese comedy film directed by Yoji Yamada. It stars Kiyoshi Atsumi as Torajirō Kuruma (Tora-san), and Yoshiko Mita as his love interest or "Madonna". Tora-san's Salad-Day Memorial is the fortieth entry in the popular, long-running Otoko wa Tsurai yo series. The title comes from Machi Tawara poetry collection Salad Anniversary, on which this movie was based.

== Synopsis ==
Taking place in Komoro, Nagano. In his travels through Japan, Tora-san meets and falls in love with a female doctor, but he is afraid of committing to a relationship.

== Cast ==
- Kiyoshi Atsumi as Torajirō
- Chieko Baisho as Sakura
- Yoshiko Mita as Machiko
- Hiroko Mita as Yuki
- Shimojo Masami as Kuruma Tatsuzō
- Chieko Misaki as Tsune Kuruma (Torajiro's aunt)
- Gin Maeda as Hiroshi Suwa
- Hidetaka Yoshioka as Mitsuo Suwa
- Hisao Dazai as Boss (Umetarō Katsura)
- Gajirō Satō as Genkō
- Toshinori Omi as Sei
- Chishū Ryū as Gozen-sama
- Tomoko Naraoka as Machiko's mother

== Critical appraisal ==
Yoshiko Mita was nominated for Best Actress at the Japan Academy Prize for her role in Tora-san's Salad-Day Memorial. Kevin Thomas at the Los Angeles Times gave the film a positive review. The German-language site molodezhnaja gives Tora-san's Salad-Day Memorial four out of five stars, labeling it one of the highlights of the series.

== Availability ==
Tora-san's Salad-Day Memorial was released theatrically on December 24, 1988. In Japan, the film has been released on videotape in 1989 and 1996, and in DVD format in 2005 and 2008.

== Bibliography ==
=== English ===
- "OTOKO WA TSURAI YO TORAJIRO SARADA KINENBI (1988)". British Film Institute. Archived from the original on 2012-10-18.
- "OTOKO WA TSURAIYO -TORAJIRO SARADA KINENBI". Complete Index to World Film.
- Otoko wa tsurai yo: Torajiro sarada kinenbi (1988) at IMDb

=== German ===
- "Tora-San's Salad-Day Memorial" (in German). www.molodezhnaja.ch.

=== Japanese ===
- 男はつらいよ 寅次郎サラダ記念日 (1988) (in Japanese). allcinema.net.
- "男はつらいよ 寅次郎サラダ記念日". Japanese Cinema Database (Agency for Cultural Affairs). Archived from the original on 2012-03-11.
- 男はつらいよ 寅次郎サラダ記念日 (in Japanese). Japanese Movie Database.
- 男はつらいよ 寅次郎サラダ記念日 (in Japanese). Kinema Junpo. Archived from the original on 2012-03-24.
