= Hiroko Mita =

Japanese actress and former idol singer (born 1966)

- 三田 寛子
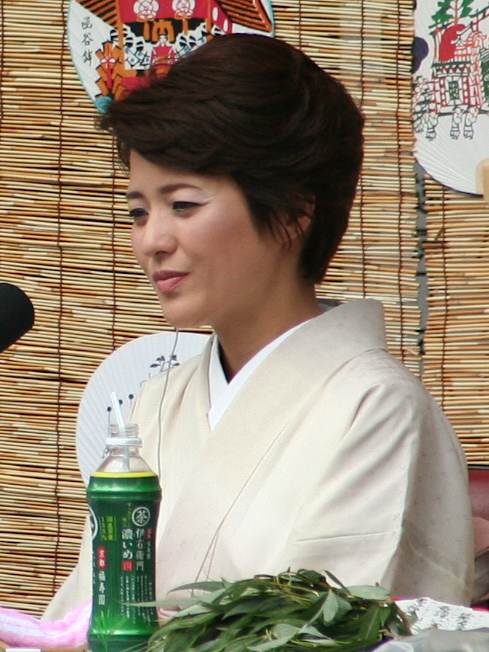
- Mita at the 2009 Kyoto City Gion Festival
- Born: Atsuko Inagaki (稲垣 敦子); January 27, 1966 (age 60); Kyoto, Japan
- Other name: Atsuko Nakamura (中村 敦子) - married name
- Occupations: Actress, Singer
- Years active: Actress: 1981–Present; Singer: 1982–1987
- Agent: Puntolinea
- Spouse: Nakamura Shikan VIII (m. 1991)
- Website: https://puntolinea.jp/archives/artist/109

Atsuko Nakamura (中村 敦子, Nakamura Atsuko, née Inagaki), known professionally as Hiroko Mita (三田 寛子, Mita Hiroko) is a Japanese actress and former idol singer. She is currently represented by Puntolinea.

== Early career ==
In 1980, after applying to become a model for Seventeen magazine, Mita moved to Tokyo and later in October of that year, she was chosen to appear in a Sony commercial for cassette tape decks. The following year in 1981, she made her acting debut as one of the female student leads in the TBS youth drama 2-nen B-gumi Senpachi-sensei (a spinoff of the popular 3-nen B-gumi Kinpachi Sensei series).

On March 21, 1982, Mita debuted as an idol singer under the CBS/Sony Label and was produced by Masatoshi Sakai. Her debut single "Kaketekita Otome" (駈けてきた処女, The Dashing Virgin), which was composed by Yōsui Inoue, was relatively successful, reaching #21 on the Oricon Singles Chart. Her following single, "Natsu No Shizuku" (夏の雫, Summer's Drops) reached #28 on the Oricon Singles Chart.

Mita's third single, "Irozuku Machi" (色づく街, The Colorful Town), was released on October 3, 1982. It was a cover of Saori Minami's 1977 single of the same name.

Her fifth single, "Hatsukoi" (初恋, First Love, released April 21, 1983) was also a cover single - this time a cover of Kōzō Murashita's single released earlier that same year. Murashita reportedly chose Mita to cover the single, aside from being a fan of hers, because Mita resembled the girl he wrote about in the lyrics (his first love). Mita's version was featured in commercials for Kao's Tonic Shampoo.

However, neither of these cover singles were successful (#50 and #56 respectively, on the Oricon Singles Chart) and her future singles followed a steady decline. Mita's talents were then redirected to acting and television appearances.

One of Mita's breakout television jobs was as a regular personality on the Fuji Television program Waratte Iitomo! alongside Tamori. Her segment, called "Hiroko Loves Sweets" (寛子のおかし大好き, Hiroko no Okashi Daisuki) where she'd make sweets on a kitchen set in the studio, usually led to hilarious disasters and hijinx, and Mita became associated with having an airheaded personality. The corner proved to be very popular and led to more roles on television.

In 1985, Mita was selected to be the hostess for the NHK educational program "You".

Mita is also part of the "Flower Group of '82" (Hana no 82-nen gumi, 花の82年組): a group of successful idol acts that all debuted in 1982 (which includes Akina Nakamori, Kyoko Koizumi, Yu Hayami, Chiemi Hori amongst others).

== Family, Personal Life & Later Career ==
Mita met the (then-named) kabuki actor Nakamura Hashinosuke III, the son of the late living national treasure Nakamura Shikan VII, on the set of Tora-san's Salad-Day Memorial. The two married in 1991 and have three sons.

Her husband's family at first was against her returning to work as an actress (they had assumed she would retire), even to the point of scolding her for having accepted television work, she was able to compromise by limiting her appearances after her marriage. Mita continues to act in roles for television and film, yet also manages to take extended leaves from show business to tour along with her family's kabuki performances.

After the death of Mita's father-in-law in 2011, her husband has since been promoted as Nakamura Shikan VIII, and all three of her sons have since debuted in the rien (professional kabuki theatre).

Her oldest son (born 1995) now bears the name of Nakamura Hashinosuke IV (her husband's former name), her second son (born 1997) is Nakamura Fukunosuke III, and her youngest (born 2001) is Nakamura Utanosuke IV.

On May 2, 2022, Mita joined Instagram.

On August 9, 2023, Mita announced on Instagram that her father, Yūzō Inagaki (稲垣 祐三), died on August 5, 2023, at the age of 87. At the same time, she also announced that her mother had already died before her father.

On November 10, 2025, Mita's eldest son, Hashinosuke, announced his engagement to former Nogizaka46 member Ami Nōjō at a press conference. During the event, Nōjō revealed that Mita had allowed her to wear the same kimono that Mita herself had worn for her own engagement announcement press conference 34 years earlier. It was also revealed that the kimono had been chosen by Mita's father-in-law for the occasion back in 1991, and that Mita wished to pass on the heirloom kimono to commemorate the special event.

== Filmography ==
| Year | Film | Role | Notes and awards |
|---|---|---|---|
| 1983 | Miyuki | Miyuki Kashima | |
| 1987 | Let's Gotoku-ji | Yuri Komae, house maid | |
| 1988 | Kizu | | |
| 1988 | Tora-san's Salad-Day Memorial | Yuki | |
