= 24th Japan Record Awards =

1982 Japanese music awards ceremony

- Date: 31 December 1982
- Venue: Imperial Garden Theater, Tokyo
- Hosted by: Keizo Takahashi, Kiyoshi Kodama, Keiko Takeshita

Television/radio coverage
- Network: TBS

The 24th Japan Record Awards were held 31 December 1982. They recognized accomplishments by musicians from this year.

The audience rating was 31.3%.

== Award winners ==
- Japan Record Award:
  - Takashi Hosokawa for "Kita Sakaba"
- Best Vocalist:
  - Junko Ohashi
- Best New Artist:
  - Shibugakitai

== See also ==
- 1982 in Japanese music
