= Aming =

Japanese musical duo

Aming (Japanese: あみん) was a female Japanese pop/folk duo composed of Takako Okamura and Haruko Kato that debuted in 1982 with their hit "Matsu wa", which reached number 1 on the Oricon Singles Chart. Their single "Kohakuiro No Omoide" (Japanese: 琥珀色の想い出) (1982) reached number 9; and their single "Kokoro Komete Ai Wo Komete" (Japanese: 心こめて愛をこめて) (1983) reached number 18. They disbanded in November 1983. They released an album in 2007 titled "In the Prime" for their 25th anniversary.

== Sources ==
- https://web.archive.org/web/20061207055722/http://www.bekkoame.ne.jp/~bluemt/T_Okamura/index_E.html
