= Uesugi Sadazane =

Japanese samurai daimyō of the Muromachi period

Uesugi Sadazane (上杉定実; 1478–1550) was a Japanese samurai daimyō of the Muromachi period.

He was shugo or military governor of Echigo Province.

== See also ==
- Uesugi clan
