= Catalog number (music) =

Identifier for a specific music release

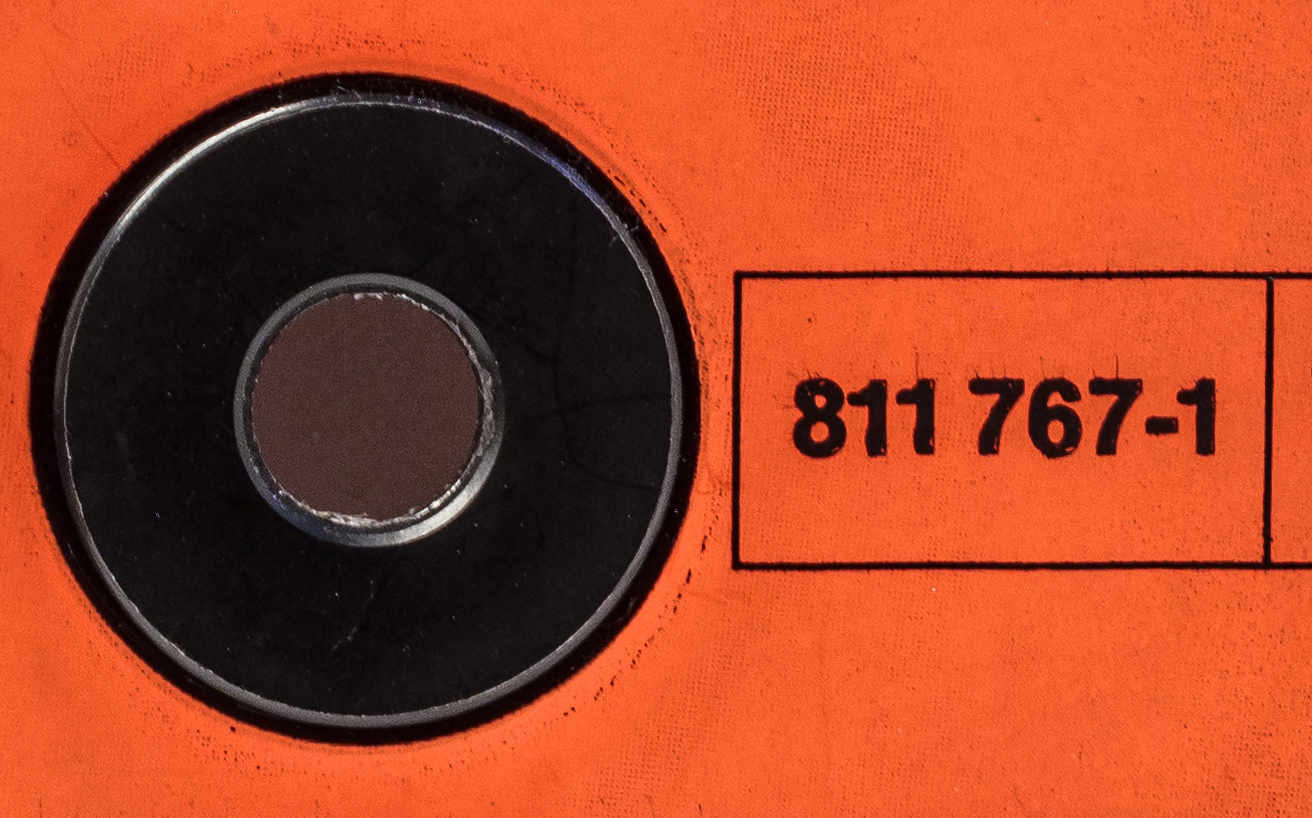
Catalog number 811 767-1, used by RSO Records, next to the center hole on a vinyl LP record

A catalog number is an identification number assigned to a music release by a record label.

Catalog numbers on music releases goes back to the early 20th century, around the same time as the 10" shellac records. Many catalog numbers were similar to the last digits of the barcode of the release, and were often followed by a format code, a single digit defining the physical music format the recording is pressed on.

Most labels placed a format code at the end of the catalog number to differentiate the release from other formats it is released on, all the while retaining the same catalog number or another close to it. However, some labels, such as Ariola Records, changed the first few digits in their catalog number instead of using a format code on either the catalog number or the barcode.

== Gallery ==
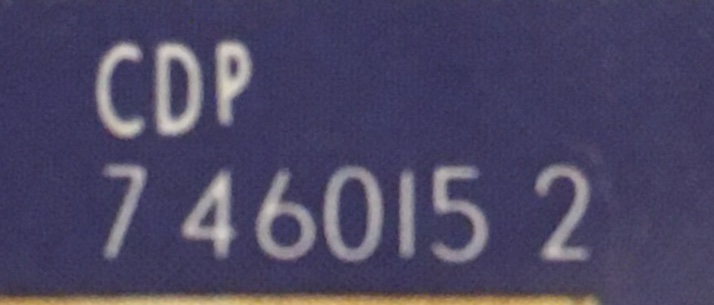
Catalog number, 7 46015 2, used by EMI Records

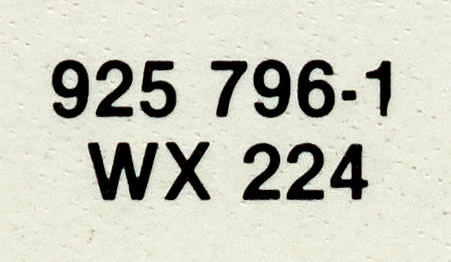
Double catalog numbers, 925 796-1 and WX 224, used on the same vinyl record

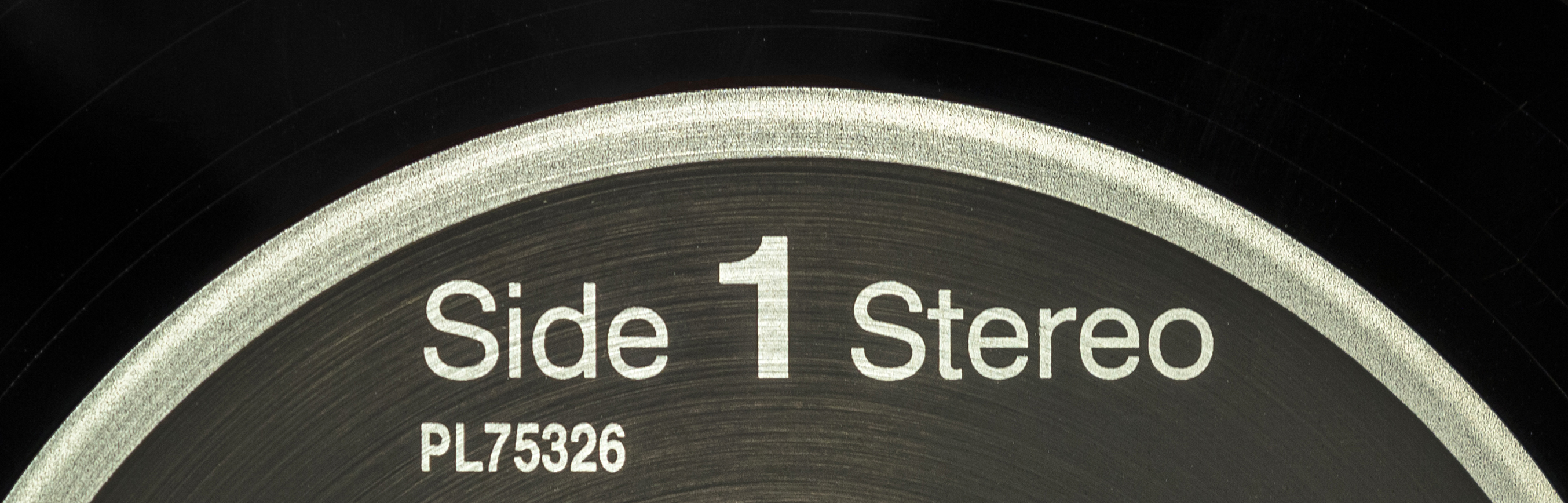
Catalog number PL75326 close to the rim of the label on a vinyl record

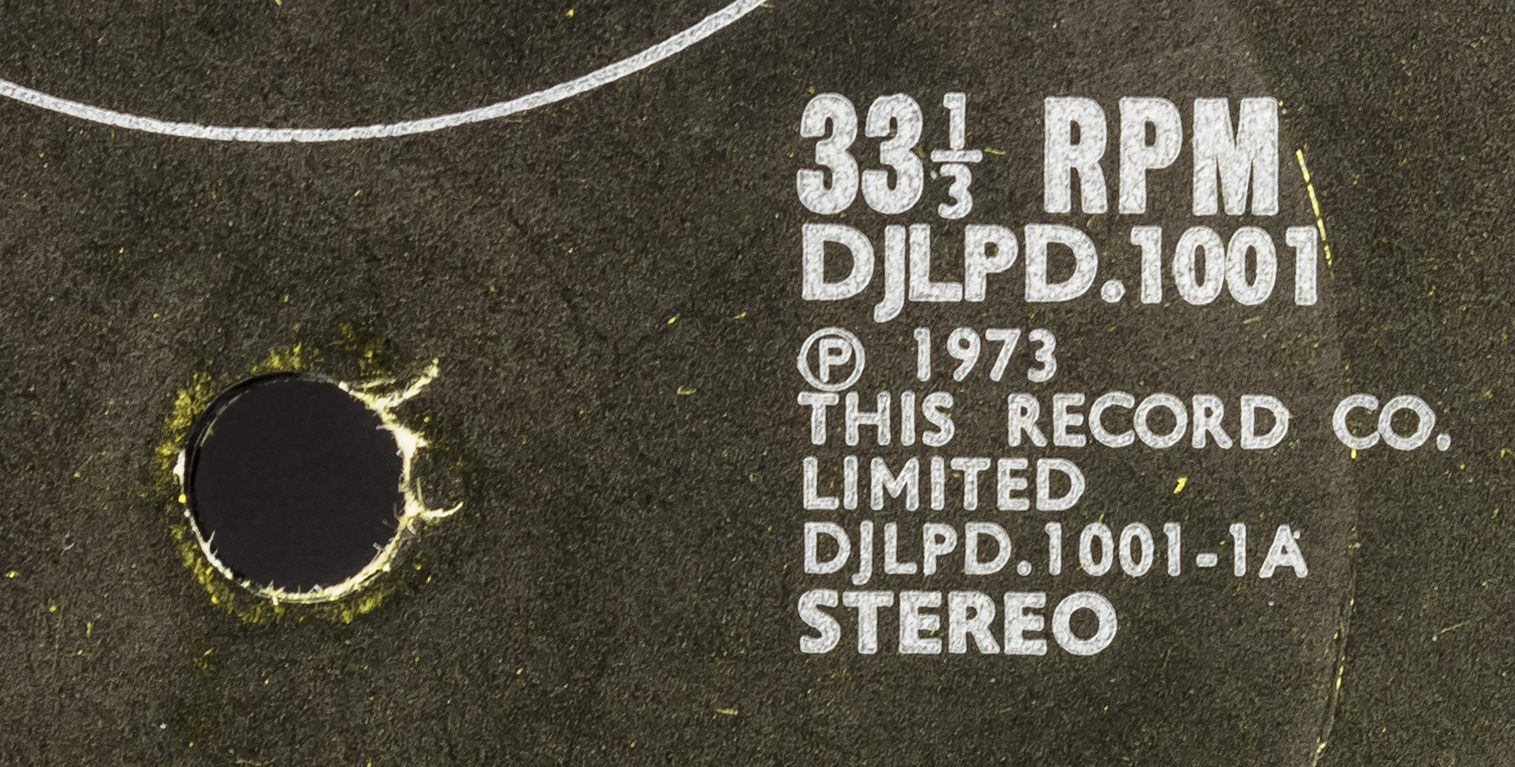
Catalog number DJLPD.1001 and additional technical information on a vinyl album

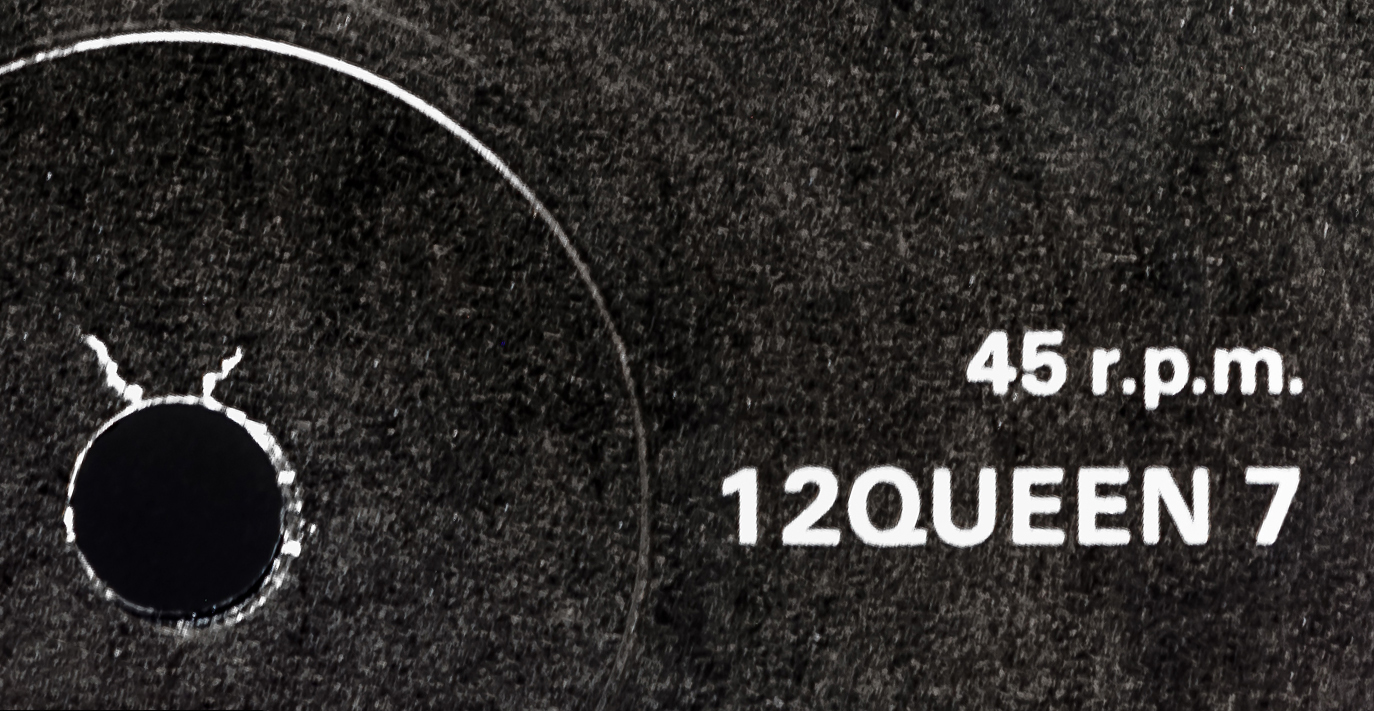
Catalog number 12QUEEN 7, which includes the name of the artists

== See also ==
- Matrix number
