= Minako Yoshida =

Japanese musician (born 1953)

Minako Yoshida 吉田 美奈子
- Born: 7 April 1953 (age 73); Ōmiya, Saitama, Japan
- Genres: Funk; city pop
- Occupations: Singer; lyricist; composer
- Instrument: Vocals
- Labels: RCA Victor; Alfa Records; MCA Victor; Avex IO
- Spouse: Aki Ikuta (m. 1984; died 1988)
- Award: Cannes Lions International Festival of Creativity Silver Award (1985)

Minako Yoshida (Japanese: 吉田 美奈子, Hepburn: Yoshida Minako; born 7 April 1953) is a Japanese singer, lyricist, and composer. She made her professional debut as a singer after meeting Happy End members Haruomi Hosono and Takashi Matsumoto during high school. Following her 1973 debut album Tobira no Fuyu, she released a few dozen albums and singles under RCA Victor, Alfa Records, MCA Victor, and Avex IO, and won the 1985 Cannes Lions International Festival of Creativity Silver Award. She also worked as a composer and lyricist, with her work including the Tatsuro Yamashita albums Circus Town (1976), Spacy (1977) and For You (1982), as well as a music producer, arranger, and backup singer. Since the 2010s, she has enjoyed renewed popularity due to the city pop wave.

== Biography ==
=== Early life and career ===
Minako Yoshida was born on 7 April 1953 in Ōmiya, Saitama. She attended Toho Senior High School before dropping out.

While in junior high school, Yoshida performed as an organist alongside blues singer Toru Oki at a Ginza disco. After she met Happy End members Haruomi Hosono and Takashi Matsumoto during high school, she made her singing debut with her 1973 album Tobira no Fuyu, before releasing another album Minako in 1975. Due to strain from releasing two albums in only six months, she hired extra help from her musical circle to create the work for her album Flapper, released in 1976. In 1977, she released another album, Twilight Zone.

=== Music career ===
Yoshida's first album with Alfa Records, Ai wa Omou Mama (1978), was produced in the Los Angeles area by Billy Page and Gene Page, with local musicians Ed Greene, Greg Phillinganes, David T. Walker, and Wah Wah Watson performing. She released four more albums with Alfa: Monochrome (1980), Monsters in Town (1981), Light'n Up (1982), and In Motion (1983). She won the 1985 Cannes Lions International Festival of Creativity Silver Award for her Suntory commercial song "Thanks to You". In addition to releasing her own songs, she did backup vocals for other artists, including Chu Kosaka and Yumi Matsutoya.

In addition to a singing career, Yoshida worked as a lyricist. The Shintei Gendai Nihonjin Meiroku remarked that she wrote "approximately half of Tatsuro Yamashita's entire discography". Her lyricist work with Yamashita included the albums Circus Town (1976), Spacy (1977) and For You (1982). Yoshida recalled that she enjoyed having "complete creative freedom" as Yamashita's lyricist but would often struggle if the composition material did not arrive soon enough; she once had to go all the way to New York City in order to sort out such delays for Circus Town. She was also a music producer and arranger, stepping away from her singing career towards such behind-the-scenes aspects of music during the mid-1980s.

Despite shifting away from singing, Yoshida still created and released albums. She later released Bells (1986), Dark Crystal (1989), and Gazer (1990); she was composer and lyricist for the latter two albums, which she also arranged computerized backing tracks of. She also released Extreme Beauty (1995), Key (1996), and Spell (1997) under MCA Victor. She performed the theme song for the 1999 drama Suzuran, and released the Suzuran Original Soundtrack in June 1999. In the 2000s, she also released four albums under Avex IO.

Yoshida acquired the nicknames "Japan's Laura Nyro" and "Queen of Funk". Tsuruta said that one of Flapper's tracks, "Yume de Aetara", has been "etched into the annals of Japanese music history" and is "now widely regarded as a Japanese standard".

In 2015, Yoshida's five Alfa albums were released as remasters by Tamotsu Yoshida. In 2017, remastered versions of Ai wa Omou Mama (1978) and Monochrome (1980) were released as part of Sony Music Japan's Great Tracks label. In July 2020, four SACD editions of Yoshida's albums, remastered by Bernie Grundman, were released. Limited-edition vinyl versions of her albums Dark Crystal, Gazer, and Bells were released in 2023.

=== Legacy and themes ===
Following the city pop wave of the 2010s and 2020s, Yoshida rose back to popularity, with Yūsuke Tsuruta of Yomiuri Shimbun calling Yoshida "one of the most-watched figures amidst the recent city pop boom." Market prices for her albums' vinyl editions spiked due to the city pop boom, with both the original and 2020 re-release of Flapper selling out quickly. Her song "Midnight Driver" appeared on the 2019 city pop compilation Pacific Breeze: Japanese City Pop, AOR and Boogie 1976–1986, becoming that album's first track. In September 2020, In Focus (a programme on British radio station NTS Radio) aired a one-hour remix of Yoshida's music.

Several observers noted that after becoming more prevalent in her music starting in the mid-1970s, funk became an integral part of some of Yoshida's releases, including Monochrome and Gazer. James Hadfield of The Japan Times called her song "Midnight Driver" a "low-slung boogie groove with enough gloss to pass for Donna Summer". Ed Cunningham of Tokyo Weekender cited Yoshida as an example of singers who "increasingly built elements of disco, funk and R&B into their balladry". Tsuruta remarked that there is a contrast between Dark Crystal and Gazer in regards to her processing of her husband's death, with the former being "introspective and austere" and the latter being an "explosively avant-garde" reaction towards her experiences with his death.

CD Journal said that Yoshida's "clear, transparent singing voice" made her stand out in the new music scene and "even exudes a majestic atmosphere [and] is unparalleled". According to Tsuruta, Yoshida had "a vocal range capable of hitting both high and low notes".

=== Personal life ===
Yoshida was married to music producer Aki Ikuta from 1984 until his death in 1988. Her brother is recording engineer Tamotsu Yoshida.

== Discography ==
=== Albums ===
Title	Year	Details	Peak chart positions	Sales
Title	Year	Details	JPN	Sales
Tobira no Fuyu (扉の冬)	1973	Released: 1973; Label: Showboat	—	—
Minako (stylized in all-caps)	1975	Released: 1975; Label: RCA Victor	—	—
Flapper (stylized in all-caps)	1976	Released: 1 January 1976; Label: RCA Victor	—	—
Twilight Zone (stylized in all-caps)	1977	Released: 1977; Label: RCA Victor	—	—
Ai wa Omou Mama (愛は思うまま)	1978	Released: 1978; Label: Alfa Records	—	—
Monochrome	1980	Released: 1980; Label: Alfa Records	—	—
Monsters in Town (stylized in all-caps)	1981	Released: 1981; Label: Alfa Records	—	—
Light'n Up	1982	Released: 1982; Label: Alfa Records	—	—
In Motion (stylized in all-caps)	1983	Released: 1983; Label: Alfa Records	—	—
Bells (stylized in all-caps)	1986	Released: 1986; Label: Edition Gaspard	32	—
Dark Crystal (stylized in all-caps)	1990	Released: 21 March 1990; Label: Happinet Pictures	45	—
Extreme Beauty (stylized in all-caps)	1995	Released: 22 February 1995; Label: MCA Victor	30	—
Gazer (stylized in low-caps)	1995	Released: 22 November 1995; Label: MCA Victor	—	—
Key (stylized in all-caps)	1996	Released: 23 October 1996; Label: MCA Victor	—	—
Spell (stylized in all-caps)	1997	Released: 22 October 1997; Label: MCA Victor	29	—
Stable	2002	Released: 9 October 2002; Label: Avex Io	—	—
Revelation (stylized in all-caps)	2003	Released: 27 November 2003; Label: Avex Io	—	—
Reconstruction (stylized in all-caps)	2004	Released: 24 March 2004; Label: Avex Io	—	—
Spangles	2006	Released: 22 February 2006; Label: Avex Io	—	—

=== Singles ===
Title	Details
"Koi Ha Ryusei" (恋は流星 (PartI・II))	Released: 1977; Label: RCA Victor
"Beauty" (in all-caps)	Released: 21 January 1995; Label: MCA Victor
"Koe o Kikasete" (声を聞かせて)	Released: 21 July 1995; Label: MCA Victor
"Graces" (in all-caps)	Released: 21 September 1996; Label: MCA Victor
"Shadow Winter" (in all-caps)	Released: 22 September 1997; Label: MCA Victor
"Temptation" (in all-caps)	Released: 11 September 2002; Label: Avex IO
"Stay (Traumerei Yori)" (STAY〜トロイメライより)	Released: 20 October 2004; Label: Avex IO
