= Hiroshi & Kibo =

Japanese musical duo (1982–1984)

- Hiroshi & Kibo in 1983

Background information
- Origin: Japan
- Genres: Kayōkyoku
- Years active: 1982 – 1984
- Labels: RCA

Hiroshi & Kibo (ヒロシ&キーボー) was a kayōkyoku musical duo active between 1982 and 1984.

== History of the duo ==
The duo formed in 1982 and consisted of actor Toshio Kurosawa's brother Hiroshi Kurosawa (1948–2024) and Yoshiko "Kibo" Yamada (born 1957). Their debut single "3 Nenme no Uwaki" (3年目の浮気, '3-Year-Affair') was a massive hit, topping the Oricon Singles Chart for three consecutive weeks, and selling about 1.3 million copies. In spite of their success, the duo was excluded from the annual Kōhaku Uta Gassen, reportedly due to the song's subject matter being infidelity. Beyond its immediate success, the song became a karaoke classic.

Following several singles, the duo disbanded in 1984. Both singers continued to perform, with Kibo Yamada focusing on jazz music. In 2008, Hiroshi & Kibo reunited to perform their signature song in NHK show Omoide no Melody. In 2017, Kibo Yamada was arrested for shoplifting. Kurosawa died of myeloid leukemia on 6 September 2024, at the age of 75.

== Discography ==
Albums

- 3年目の浮気/ヒロシ&キーボー（1982）
- ベスト16/ヒロシ&キーボー（1983）
