= Shigeharu Mukai =

Japanese jazz trombonist

Shigeharu Mukai (向井 滋春, Mukai Shigeharu; born January 21, 1949 in Nagoya) is a Japanese jazz trombonist.

Mukai attended Doshisha University but left before obtaining his degree to become a professional musician. Early in his career he worked with Yoshio Otomo, Ryo Kawasaki, and Hiroshi Fukumura, then led his own ensemble, including a performance at the Shinjuku Jazz Festival. He went on to work with Terumasa Hino, Akira Sakata, Kazumi Watanabe, and Yosuke Yamashita, as well as the ensemble Spik and Span and international musicians like João Bosco, Billy Hart, and Elvin Jones.

In the 1970s, while living in Musashino, Tokyo, Mukai performed at Peter Cat, the jazz café that novelist Haruki Murakami opened and ran.

In the 1990s and 2000s he taught jazz at Senzoku Gakuen school of music.
