= Hiroyuki Namba =

Japanese musician (born 1953)

- Born: September 9, 1953 (age 72); Tokyo, Japan
- Genres: Progressive rock
- Occupations: Composer, musician
- Instrument: Keyboards
- Years active: 1979–present
- Website: Old official website Current official website

Hiroyuki Namba (難波 弘之, Nanba Hiroyuki; born September 9, 1953) (occasionally credited as Hiroyuki Nanba) is a Japanese musician. He has composed for and arranged songs from Japanese anime, OVA and video games. Notably, Hiroyuki Namba composed for Dallos, the first anime Original video animation. However, in the United States, he is known for composing the soundtrack to the Armitage III film. Namba plays keyboards in Sense of Wonder, a Japanese progressive rock band.

== Works ==
- 1983 - Dallos (OVA)
- 1987 - Ladius (OVA)
- 1987 - Digital Devil Story: Megami Tensei (OVA)
- 1988 - Starship Troopers (OVA)
- 1989 - Baoh (OVA)
- 1989 - Wrestler Gundan Seisenshi Robin Jr. (TV series)
- 1991 - Sohryuden: Legend of the Dragon Kings (OVA)
- 1995 - Armitage III (OVA)
- 1996 - Burn Up W (OVA)
- 1997 - Armitage III: Poly-Matrix (Movie)
- 1998 - DT Eightron (TV series)
- 2000 - Transformers: Car Robot (TV series)
- 2014 - Space Dandy (TV series)

== Associated acts ==
- Sense of Wonder (1987 -)
- Tatsuro Yamashita (1978 -)
- Horii Katsumi Project
- Nuovo Immigrato (1997 -)
- Yajuh Ohkoku (1997-)
- Acoustic Progressive Jazz (2000 -)
- ExhiVision (2004-2009)

== Discography ==
=== Hiroyuki Namba solo ===
Date		Title
1979	September 21	Sense of Wonder
1981	May 21	Party Tonight
1982	January 21	飛行船の上のシンセサイザー弾き (Synthesist on a Zeppelin)
1985	March 21	ブルジョワジーの秘かな愉しみ (Le charme discret de la bourgeoisie)
1986	April 21	N氏の天球儀 (The Celestial Globe of Mr. "N")

=== Sense of Wonder ===
Date		Title
1987	April 21	Synphobeat
1988	September 7	Aquaplanet

=== Image albums (Hiroyuki Namba and Sense of Wonder) ===
Date		Title
1984	March 25	真幻魔大戦
1984	April 21	グリーンレクイエム (Green Requiem)
1985	December 15	銀河ネットワークで歌を歌ったクジラ

=== Hiroyuki Namba and Sense of Wonder ===
Date		Title
2001	November 25	Earth Side

=== Arrangements ===
- 1988 - Music from Ys II (tracks 26~29)
- 1988 - Sorcerian Super Arrange Version
- 1988 - Sorcerian Super Arrange Version II Plus Sorcerian System Vol. 1 (tracks 1~7)
- 1989 - Sorcerian Super Arrange Version III Sengoku Sorcerian vs. Pyramid Sorcerian (tracks 1~3)
- 1989 - Falcom Sound Catalog Special Digest Disc (tracks 1, 5~11)
- 1989 - Ys III: Wanderers from Ys -Super Arrange Version- (tracks 1, 2, 4~9)
- 1992 - Falcom "NAMBA" Collection
- 1998 - Very Best of Ys (track 11)
- 2001 - Genso Suikoden Music Collection Produced by Hiroyuki Namba
- 2003 - Ys Special Collection -All About Falcom- Memorial Sounds (tracks 1, 4)
- 2005 - Heavy Metal Thunder -The Recordings- (composed and arranged track 9)

=== Soundtracks ===
- 1997 - Armitage III - Poly-Matrix
