= Isle of Dogs (film) =

- Theatrical release poster
- Directed by: Wes Anderson
- Screenplay by: Wes Anderson
- Story by: Wes Anderson; Roman Coppola; Jason Schwartzman; Kunichi Nomura
- Produced by: Wes Anderson; Scott Rudin; Steven Rales; Jeremy Dawson
- Starring: Bryan Cranston; Koyu Rankin; Edward Norton; Liev Schreiber; Bill Murray; Bob Balaban; Jeff Goldblum; Scarlett Johansson; Kunichi Nomura; Tilda Swinton; Ken Watanabe; Akira Ito; Greta Gerwig; Akira Takayama; Frances McDormand; F. Murray Abraham; Yojiro Noda; Fisher Stevens; Mari Natsuki; Nijiro Murakami; Yoko Ono; Harvey Keitel; Frank Wood
- Narrated by: Courtney B. Vance
- Cinematography: Tristan Oliver
- Edited by: Andrew Weisblum; Ralph Foster; Edward Bursch
- Music by: Alexandre Desplat
- Production companies: Indian Paintbrush; American Empirical Pictures
- Distributed by: Fox Searchlight Pictures
- Release dates: February 15, 2018 (Berlinale); March 23, 2018 (United States); March 30, 2018 (United Kingdom); May 10, 2018 (Germany)
- Running time: 101 minutes
- Countries: United States; Germany; United Kingdom
- Language: English
- Budget: $35 million
- Box office: $73 million

Isle of Dogs (Japanese: 犬ヶ島, Hepburn: Inu ga Shima) is a 2018 stop-motion adult animated science fiction comedy-drama film of British-American-German co-production The film was written, produced, and directed by Wes Anderson, narrated by Courtney B. Vance and starring an ensemble cast consisting of Bryan Cranston, Koyu Rankin, Edward Norton, Liev Schreiber, Bill Murray, Bob Balaban, Jeff Goldblum, Scarlett Johansson, Kunichi Nomura, Tilda Swinton, Ken Watanabe, Akira Ito, Greta Gerwig, Akira Takayama, Frances McDormand, F. Murray Abraham, Yojiro Noda, Fisher Stevens, Mari Natsuki, Nijiro Murakami, Yoko Ono, Harvey Keitel and Frank Wood. Isle of Dogs was produced by Studio Babelsberg, 3 Mills Studios and Indian Paintbrush in association with Anderson's own company American Empirical Pictures. This was Anderson's second stop-motion film, following Fantastic Mr. Fox. The film is set in the fictional Japanese city of Megasaki where Mayor Kenji Kobayashi has banished all dogs to Trash Island due to a canine influenza pandemic. Kobayashi's nephew Atari sets out to find his missing dog Spots with the help of a group of dogs led by stray dog Chief.

Anderson started developing the film in October 2015 using stop-motion animation, with a voice cast of Norton, Cranston and Balaban. It draws inspiration from films by Akira Kurosawa and Hayao Miyazaki, as well as the stop-motion animated holiday specials made by Rankin/Bass Productions, the 1982 animated film The Plague Dogs, and Disney's 101 Dalmatians. Production began in October 2016 at the 3 Mills Studios in East London. By December 2016, Fox Searchlight Pictures acquired worldwide distribution rights to the film, scheduling it for a 2018 release. It is the second animated film to be released by Fox Searchlight, seventeen years after Waking Life in 2001. It is the only 20th Century Fox Animation film to be released by Fox Searchlight.

Isle of Dogs opened the 68th Berlin International Film Festival, where Anderson was awarded the Silver Bear for Best Director. It was given a limited release in the United States on March 23, 2018, and went on wide release on April 13. It grossed nearly $73 million worldwide, and received critical acclaim for its animation, story, musical score, and deadpan humor. The film received two nominations at the 91st Academy Awards, for Best Animated Feature and Best Score.

Isle of Dogs was criticized for its portrayal of Japanese people and culture, with critics raising concerns about racial stereotyping, Orientalism, cultural appropriation, and its use of a white savior narrative.

== Plot ==
A thousand years ago, dogs were free to roam as they pleased. However, the cat-supremacist Kobayashi Dynasty declared war on dogs, seeking to eradicate them. A child warrior sympathetic towards the threatened dogs decapitated the head of the Kobayashi Clan, ending the war, and was immortalized as the Boy Samurai of Legend.

In 2038, an outbreak of canine flu spreads throughout the Japanese city of Megasaki. The city's authoritarian mayor, Kenji Kobayashi, ratifies an official decree banishing all dogs to Trash Island, despite the insistence of Professor Watanabe, the mayor's political opponent, that he is close to creating a cure. The first deported canine is a white and black-spotted male dog named Spots Kobayashi, who served as the bodyguard of 12-year-old orphan Atari Kobayashi, the mayor's distant nephew and ward.

Six months later, Atari hijacks a plane and flies it to Trash Island, now nicknamed "the Isle of Dogs", to search for Spots. After crash-landing, Atari is rescued by a dog pack ostensibly led by an all-black canine named Chief, a lifelong stray, along with Rex, Boss, Duke, and King. With their help, Atari finds a locked cage that apparently contains Spots' skeleton, but they realize it is not him. They then fend off a rescue team sent by Mayor Kobayashi to retrieve Atari. Chief initially declines to continue helping Atari find Spots, but is convinced by Nutmeg, a female ex-show dog whom Chief is smitten with. The pack seeks advice from sage-like dogs Jupiter and Oracle, who surmise that Spots might be held captive by an isolated tribe of dogs rumored to be cannibals.

Meanwhile, Watanabe finally develops a successful serum and shows the results to Kobayashi, who merely dismisses him. By order of the mayor's hatchet man Major Domo, the professor is placed under house arrest and assassinated with poisoned sushi. Tracy Walker, an American exchange student, member of a pro-dog activist group and Nutmeg's owner, suspects a conspiracy and begins to investigate, in the process developing feelings for Atari. Kobayashi and his political party are revealed to be responsible for the dog flu outbreak and aim to succeed at exterminating dogs where Kobayashi's ancestors failed.

During their journey to the dog tribe, Chief and Atari are separated from the others. Atari gives Chief a bath, revealing his white and black-spotted coat and thus his striking resemblance to Spots. The two bond and rejoin the rest of the pack. Another rescue team attacks them, but they are saved by Spots and the dog tribe. Spots confirms that he is Chief's older brother and that he was rescued by the tribe, who were test subjects from an abandoned secret lab. Spots became their leader and mated with a female tribe member named Peppermint, who is pregnant with their first litter. Because of these new responsibilities, Spots requests Atari replace him as his bodyguard with Chief; initially hesitant, both he and Atari accept. Word reaches the dog tribe that Kobayashi plans to euthanize all dogs with poison gas; Atari and the dogs build boats to return to Megasaki. Meanwhile, Tracy confronts Watanabe's colleague Yoko Ono, who confirms Tracy's conspiracy theories and gives her the last vial of serum.

At his re-election ceremony, Kobayashi prepares to give the extermination order when Tracy and the activist group interrupt, presenting evidence of his corruption. Kobayashi proceeds to deport Tracy, but before he can do so, Atari and the dogs arrive. They confirm that the serum works by testing it on Chief, curing him. Atari addresses the crowd and recites a haiku he wrote and dedicated to Kobayashi, rekindling the sympathy that once existed between dogs and humans. Initially enraged by his nephew's rebellion, Mayor Kobayashi suffers an epiphany at his words (instantly reminded of the legend of the Boy Samurai) before shamefully confessing all his corruption and officially repeals the dog banishment decree. Enraged, Major Domo tries to initiate the extermination himself, but his plans are thwarted by the dogs and the activist group. In the chaos, Atari and Spots are wounded and taken to a hospital, where a repentant Kobayashi donates one of his kidneys to save his nephew. Atari becomes the new mayor of Megasaki after Kobayashi's crimes render him ineligible to hold office.

One month later, Atari has had all dogs reintegrated into society and cured of the dog flu; while Kobayashi, Major Domo, and their co-conspirators are all sent to jail with Major Domo soon to get a death sentence. Chief's pack dogs are all back with their owners: Boss returns to being the mascot of the Dragons' baseball team (inferred that the coach owns him), King has returned to being a dog food commercial star and lives with a couple with their 3 children and has a big supply of dog food and puppy snaps, Duke lives with a large family who is seen watching one of King's commercials on TV, and Rex is owned by an elderly female librarian and is shown by her in the library with his own thick mat. Atari and Tracy become a couple, while Chief and Nutmeg become their bodyguard dogs. Meanwhile, Spots, having survived his injuries, raises his litter with Peppermint under the care of a Shinto priest.

== Cast ==
- Bryan Cranston as Chief, a stray dog who accompanies Atari on his journey to find Spots
- Koyu Rankin as Atari Kobayashi, a boy who is on a search for his dog Spots
- Edward Norton as Rex, a German Shepherd
- Bob Balaban as King, a German Wirehaired Pointer who is a dog food commercial star
- Jeff Goldblum as Duke, a Siberian Husky
- Bill Murray as Boss, an Akita who is the mascot of the Megasaki Dragons high school baseball team
- Kunichi Nomura as Mayor Kenji Kobayashi, the mayor of Megasaki and uncle of Atari
- Akira Takayama as Major Domo, the minion of Mayor Kobayashi, and a fascist figure. In the climax of the film his role as a butler is revealed to be a facade; his true nature is that of an authoritarian figure with villainous goals, and not a loyal follower of the Kobayashi family tradition.
- Greta Gerwig as Tracy Walker, an American foreign exchange student from Cincinnati, Ohio.
- Frances McDormand as Interpreter Miranda Nelson, a news reporter working in Megasaki
- Akira Ito as Professor Ichigo Watanabe, the professor whose canine flu antidote was rejected by Mayor Kobayashi
- Scarlett Johansson as Nutmeg, a show dog and Tracy Walker's dog
- Liev Schreiber as Spots, an Oceanic speckle-eared-sport hound mix, the first dog to be transported to Trash Island
- F. Murray Abraham as Jupiter, a Newfoundland
- Tilda Swinton as Oracle, a pug
- Yoko Ono as Yoko Ono, Professor Watanabe's assistant scientist
- Harvey Keitel as Gondo
- Ken Watanabe as Head Surgeon
- Mari Natsuki as Auntie
- Fisher Stevens as Scrap
- Nijirō Murakami as Editor Hiroshi
- Courtney B. Vance as The Narrator
- Yojiro Noda as News Anchor
- Frank Wood as Simul-Translate Machine
- Roman Coppola as Igor
- Anjelica Huston as Mute Poodle
- Kara Hayward as Peppermint, a dog who Spots mates with
- Takayuki Yamada as Junior Scientist #1
- Kozue Akimoto as Junior Scientist #2
- Shota Matsuda as Junior Scientist #3
- Ryuhei Matsuda as:
  - Junior Scientist #4
  - Bartender
- Jake Ryan as Ernie, a junior interpreter
- Elaiza Ikeda as Punk Girl

== Production ==
=== Development ===
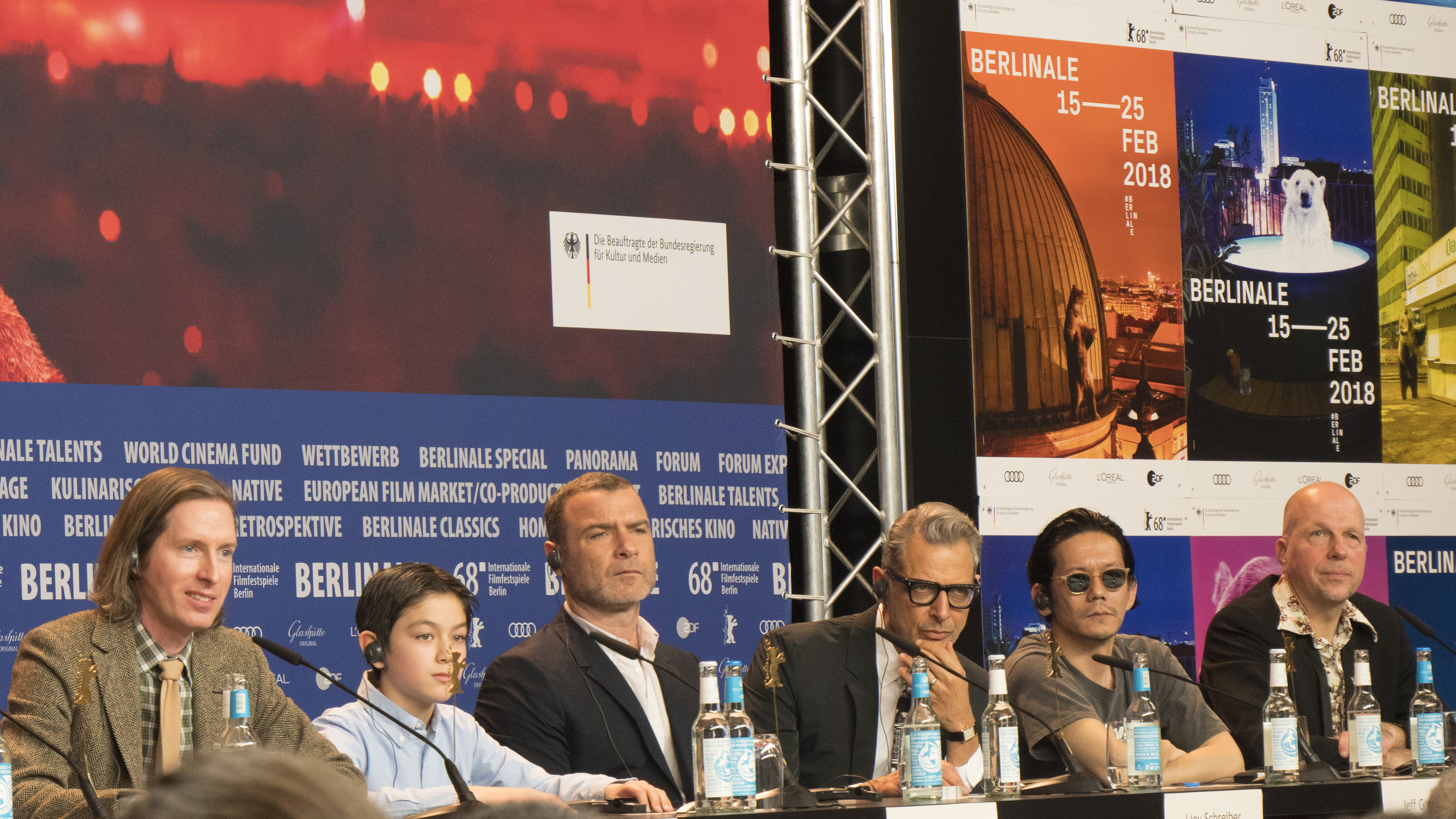
Isle of Dogs press conference at the 68th Berlin International Film Festival, February 2018

In October 2015, Wes Anderson, who had previously directed the animated film Fantastic Mr. Fox, announced he would be returning to the medium with "a film about dogs" starring Edward Norton, Bryan Cranston and Bob Balaban. Anderson has said that he was inspired by seeing a road sign for the Isle of Dogs in England while Fantastic Mr. Fox was in development. Anderson said that the film was influenced by the films of Akira Kurosawa and Hayao Miyazaki, as well as the stop-motion animated holiday specials made by Rankin/Bass Productions, the 1982 animated film The Plague Dogs, and Disney's 101 Dalmatians.

=== Filming ===
Production began in October 2016 at the 3 Mills Studios in East London.

About 20,000 faces and 1,105 animatable puppets were crafted by "12 sculptors working six days a week" for the film; 2,000 more puppets were made for background characters. The detailed puppets of the main characters typically took 2–3 months to create. There was very little CG used, it only being used to duplicate audience members, or using green screens for actions that could not be filmed at the same time. For the effects, over 200 detailed, hand-made settings were made. The animation department included a number of people who had worked on Fantastic Mr. Fox.

=== Virtual reality ===
Concurrently with the film, Félix and Paul Studios and FoxNext VR Studio collaborated on Isle of Dogs: Behind the Scenes (in Virtual Reality), an immersive video film that places the viewer directly inside the animated world. The virtual reality film was released on the Google Pixel platform.

=== Music ===
The film's score was composed by Alexandre Desplat, who had previously worked with Wes Anderson on Fantastic Mr. Fox, Moonrise Kingdom, and The Grand Budapest Hotel. The soundtrack also features various original and selected songs from a variety of musicians, mainly from Japan. Some songs had origins in classic Japanese cinema such as the Akira Kurosawa films Drunken Angel (1948) and Seven Samurai (1954). The soundtrack comprises 22 tracks in total, 15 of which were composed by Desplat.

== Release ==
On December 23, 2016, Fox Searchlight Pictures acquired worldwide distribution rights to the film, with plans for a 2018 release.

The film premiered as the opening film of the 68th Berlin International Film Festival on February 15, 2018, and had its North American premiere as the closing film of the SXSW Film Festival in Austin, Texas, on March 17, 2018. Isle of Dogs began a limited release in the U.S. on March 23, 2018. It was released nationwide in the United States on April 13, 2018.

=== Box office ===
Isle of Dogs has grossed $32 million in the United States and Canada, and $32.1 million in other territories, for a worldwide total of $64.1 million.

In its first weekend of limited release, the film made $1.57 million from 27 theaters (an average of $58,148 per venue). It was the best per-theater average of 2018 until it was overtaken by Eighth Grade in July. Sixty percent of its audience was under the age of 30. In its second weekend, the film made $2.8 million from 165 theaters (an increase of 74%), finishing 11th. The film entered the top 10 in its third weekend, making $4.6 million from 554 theaters. The film expanded to 1,939 theaters the following week and made $5.4 million, finishing seventh at the box office.

=== Home media ===
Isle of Dogs was released digitally on June 26, 2018, and on DVD and Blu-ray on July 17, 2018.

On streaming, Isle of Dogs was added on Disney+ in the US and Canada on January 15, 2021. It was added to the UK and Australian versions on 17 September 2021.

The film was released on Ultra HD Blu-ray and Blu-ray by The Criterion Collection on September 30, 2025, as part of the ten film collection The Wes Anderson Archive: Ten Films, Twenty-Five Years and as a standalone disc.

== Reception ==
=== Critical response ===
On review aggregation website Rotten Tomatoes, the film holds an approval rating of 90% based on 368 reviews, and an average rating of 8/10. The website's critical consensus reads, "The beautifully stop-motion animated Isle of Dogs finds Wes Anderson at his detail-oriented best, while telling one of the director's most winsomely charming stories." On Metacritic, the film has a weighted average score of 82 out of 100, based on 55 critics, indicating "universal acclaim". Audiences polled by CinemaScore gave the film an average grade of "A" on an A+ to F scale, while PostTrak reported filmgoers gave it an overall positive score of 88%.

Richard Roeper of the Chicago Sun-Times gave the film three-and-a-half stars out of four, praising it for taking risks, and saying, "It's smart and different and sometimes deliberately odd and really funny; rarely in a laugh-out-loud way, more in a smile-and-nod-I-get-the-joke kind of way."

=== Accolades ===
Isle of Dogs received two Academy Awards, BAFTAs, and Golden Globe Award nominations for Best Animated Feature and Original Score, making it the first PG-13 rated animation to be nominated for these awards.

Award	Date of ceremony	Category	Recipient(s)	Result	Ref.
Academy Awards	February 24, 2019	Best Animated Feature	Wes Anderson, Scott Rudin, Steven Rales and Jeremy Dawson	Nominated	
Academy Awards	February 24, 2019	Best Original Score	Alexandre Desplat	Nominated	
Alliance of Women Film Journalists	January 10, 2019	Best Animated Feature Film	Wes Anderson	Nominated	
Alliance of Women Film Journalists	January 10, 2019	Best Animated Female	Greta Gerwig as Tracy Walker	Nominated	
Annie Awards	February 2, 2019	Best Animated Feature	Wes Anderson, Scott Rudin, Steven Rales and Jeremy Dawson	Nominated	
Annie Awards	February 2, 2019	Outstanding Achievement for Character Animation in an Animated Feature Production	Jason Stalman	Nominated	
Annie Awards	February 2, 2019	Outstanding Achievement for Production Design in an Animated Feature Production	Adam Stockhausen and Paul Harrod	Nominated	
Annie Awards	February 2, 2019	Outstanding Achievement for Voice Acting in an Animated Feature Production	Bryan Cranston	Won	
Art Directors Guild Awards	February 2, 2019	Excellence in Production Design for an Animated Film	Adam Stockhausen and Paul Harrod	Won	
Berlin International Film Festival	February 25, 2018	Silver Bear for Best Director	Wes Anderson	Won	
Berlin International Film Festival	February 25, 2018	Golden Bear	Isle of Dogs	Nominated	
British Academy Film Awards	February 10, 2019	Best Animated Film	Wes Anderson	Nominated	
British Academy Film Awards	February 10, 2019	Best Original Score	Alexandre Desplat	Nominated	
Chicago Film Critics Association Awards	December 7, 2018	Best Animated Feature	Wes Anderson	Nominated	
Cinema Audio Society Awards	February 16, 2019	Outstanding Achievement in Sound Mixing for a Motion Picture – Animated	Darrin Moore, Christopher Scarabosio, Wayne Lemmer, Xavier Forcioli, Simon Rhodes and Peter Persaud	Won	
Critics' Choice Movie Awards	January 11, 2019	Best Animated Feature	Wes Anderson	Nominated	
Critics' Choice Movie Awards	January 11, 2019	Best Score	Alexandre Desplat	Nominated	
Dallas–Fort Worth Film Critics Association	December 17, 2018	Best Animated Feature	Isle of Dogs	Won	
Florida Film Critics Circle Awards	December 21, 2018	Best Animated Feature	Isle of Dogs	Nominated	
Golden Globe Awards	January 6, 2019	Best Animated Feature Film	Wes Anderson	Nominated	
Golden Globe Awards	January 6, 2019	Best Original Score	Alexandre Desplat	Nominated	
Golden Trailer Awards	May 31, 2018	Best Animation/Family TV Spot	Isle of Dogs: ":30TV 'Sic Em"	Nominated	
Golden Trailer Awards	May 31, 2018	Best Motion Poster	Isle of Dogs: "Sneezing"	Won	
Golden Trailer Awards	May 31, 2018	Best Motion Poster	Isle of Dogs: "Wild Post"	Nominated	
Golden Trailer Awards	May 31, 2018	Best Animation/Family	Isle of Dogs: "Domestic Trailer #1"	Won	
Hollywood Music in Media Awards	November 14, 2018	Original Score – Animated Film	Alexandre Desplat	Won	
Humanitas Prize	February 8, 2019	Family Feature Film	Wes Anderson, Roman Coppola, Jason Schwartzman and Kunichi Nomura	Nominated	
Imagine Film Festival	April 20, 2018	Silver Scream Award	Wes Anderson	Won	
Online Film Critics Society	January 2, 2019	Best Animated Feature	Isle of Dogs	Nominated	
Online Film Critics Society	January 2, 2019	Best Score	Alexandre Desplat	Nominated	
Producers Guild Awards	January 19, 2019	The Award for Outstanding Producer of Animated Theatrical Motion Pictures	Isle of Dogs	Nominated	
Satellite Awards	February 17, 2019	Best Animated or Mixed Media Film	Wes Anderson	Won	
San Diego Film Critics Society	December 10, 2018	Best Original Screenplay	Wes Anderson	Nominated	
San Diego Film Critics Society	December 10, 2018	Best Animated Feature	Isle of Dogs	Won	
San Diego Film Critics Society	December 10, 2018	Best Visual Effects	Isle of Dogs	Nominated	
San Francisco Film Critics Circle	December 9, 2018	Best Animated Feature	Isle of Dogs	Nominated	
Seattle Film Critics Society	December 17, 2018	Best Animated Feature	Wes Anderson	Nominated	
South by Southwest Film Festival	March 17, 2018	Audience Award: Headliners	Isle of Dogs	Won	
St. Louis Film Critics Association	December 16, 2018	Best Animated Feature	Isle of Dogs	Runner-up	
Toronto Film Critics Association	December 9, 2018	Best Animated Feature	Isle of Dogs	Won	
Visual Effects Society Awards	February 5, 2019	Outstanding Visual Effects in an Animated Feature	Mark Waring, Jeremy Dawson, Tim Ledbury, Lev Kolobov	Nominated	
Washington D.C. Area Film Critics Association Awards	December 3, 2018	Best Animated Feature	Wes Anderson	Won	
Washington D.C. Area Film Critics Association Awards	December 3, 2018	Best Animated Voice Performance	Bryan Cranston	Won	
World Soundtrack Awards	October 17, 2018	Soundtrack Composer of the Year	Alexandre Desplat (Note: Also for his work in Endangered Species, Suburbicon, The Shape of Water, and Valerian and the City of a Thousand Planets.)	Won	

== Controversies ==
=== Allegations of racial stereotyping ===
Some critics have argued that the film is an example of racial stereotyping, Orientalism, cultural appropriation and 'white savior' archetype. The Japanese characters speak unsubtitled Japanese, with their dialogue instead being translated by an interpreter or a machine. Michael Sun of VICE described the film as “a White Man’s Fantasy of Japan,” accusing it of racism, cultural appropriation, and promoting a white-savior narrative. Sun argued that the film does not treat Japanese people as “living, breathing humans,” criticizing its reduction of non-white characters and cultures to “little more than decoration for white storylines.” He also noted the portrayal of Tracy as “a white saviour who single handedly leads an uprising against Megasaki’s corrupt politicians, whilst emotionless Japanese citizens watch from the sidelines like perfect portraits of Asian subordination.” Ann Hornaday of The Washington Post wrote that “the specter of cultural appropriation haunts” the film. She also criticized what she described as several “patronizing missteps,” citing a scene in which “Greta Gerwig [plays] Tracy, a spirited American exchange student who rallies her meekly obedient Japanese cohorts to save the dogs.” Steve MacFarlane of Slant Magazine criticized the film for racial stereotyping, noting that although it is set in a Japanese city, its heroes are predominantly voiced by white actors. He criticized the character of American exchange student Tracy (Greta Gerwig), writing, “Worse still is an American exchange student, Tracy (Greta Gerwig), with a crush on Atari, and who leads a singlehanded campaign to turn the tide of public opinion against Mayor Kobayashi, thus reifying old stereotypes about Japanese passivity.” He further commented, “Ostensibly for laughs, one scene sees Tracy angrily throttling a crestfallen Japanese scientist by the neck. Given the painstaking frame-by-frame choreography of a film like this, it seems Anderson failed to entirely consider how this might come off to an even remotely skeptical viewership.” Austin Trunick of Under the Radar wrote that “Anderson’s blanket appropriation of Japanese style and culture has the potential to leave a mildly gross, Orientalist aftertaste in some viewers’ mouths.” He further argued that “the fact that(outside of young Atari) the main characters are Western-voiced dogs and a white American foreign exchange student draws additional attention to the too-often-‘wacky’ otherness of the film’s setting.”

Justin Chang of the Los Angeles Times wrote, "It's in the director's handling of the story's human factor that his sensitivity falters, and the weakness for racial stereotyping that has sometimes marred his work comes to the fore ... Much of the Japanese dialogue has been pared down to simple statements that non-speakers can figure out based on context and facial expressions." Angie Han, writing in Mashable, cites the American exchange student character Tracy as a "classic example of the 'white savior' archetype—the well-meaning white hero who arrives in a foreign land and saves its people from themselves." While this critique had created some furor on the film's release, Chang has said that his review had been taken out of context and turned into a "battle cry" on Twitter, adding, "I wasn't offended, nor was I looking to be offended." A Japanese-American perspective was provided by Emily Yoshida, writing in New York magazine, that these concerns had been "seen before in debates about Asian culture as reflected by Western culture—perspectives can vary wildly between Asian-Americans and immigrated Asians, and what feels like tribute to some feels like opportunism to others."

Writing for BuzzFeed, Alison Willmore found "no overt malicious intent to Isle of Dogs' cultural tourism, but it's marked by a hodgepodge of references that an American like Anderson might cough up if pressed to free associate about Japan—taiko drummers, anime, Hokusai, sumo, kabuki, haiku, cherry blossoms, and a mushroom cloud (!). ... This all has more to do with the ... insides of Anderson's brain than it does any actual place. It's Japan purely as an aesthetic, and another piece of art that treats the East not as a living, breathing half of the planet, but as a mirror for the Western imagination." She continued, "In the wake of Isle of Dogs' opening weekend, there were multiple headlines wondering whether the film was an act of appropriation or homage. But the question is rhetorical; the two aren't mutually exclusive, and the former is not automatically off the table just because the creator's intent was the latter."

Anderson's decision not to subtitle the Japanese speakers struck me as a carefully considered artistic choice. Isle of Dogs is profoundly interested in the humor and fallibility of translation ... This is the beating heart of the film: there is no such thing as "true" translation. Everything is interpreted. Translation is malleable and implicated, always, by systems of power ... [the film] shows the seams of translation, and demarcates a space that is accessible and funny, only to Japanese viewers.

Fujii responded to perceptions that character of Tracy Walker was a "white savior", and how this relates to the film's language theme, writing,

At a climactic moment, the movie rejects the notion of universal legibility, placing the onus of interpretation solely upon the American audience ... This is a sly subversion, in which the Japanese evince an agency independent of foreign validation. Indeed, to say that the scene dehumanizes the Japanese is to assume the primacy of an English-speaking audience. Such logic replicates the very tyranny of language that Isle of Dogs attempts to erode.

Japanese composer Ryuichi Sakamoto said in an interview to GQ Magazine regarding the film: "I think it's a well-crafted movie. Its aesthetic is so perfect, I think. People could enjoy that. But as a Japanese, you know, to me, it's kind of the same thing again. Old Hollywood movies, they always used their mixed image of Japanese or Chinese or Korean or Vietnamese. It's a wrong stereotypical image of Asian people. So I cannot take it."

Center for Asian American Media (CAAM), an Asian American and Pacific Islander (AAPI) organization, released a statement about the controversy, “This film is part of a larger oeuvre that includes films like The Darjeeling Unlimited that uses ‘exotic’ people and locations as window dressings. Anderson’s aesthetic hasn’t evolved despite the larger conversations sweeping the industry. This is just one example of why there still needs to be more films directed by women, people of color, and people from other marginalized communities.”

In an interview with Entertainment Weekly, director Wes Anderson described the film as a fantasy rather than an accurate depiction of Japan, stating, “The movie is a fantasy, and I would never suggest that this is an accurate depiction of any particular Japan ... This is definitely a reimagining of Japan through my experience of Japanese cinema.” At the Berlin Film Festival, Anderson further explained that although the story could have taken place anywhere, the filmmakers chose Japan because of their shared appreciation for its cinema, particularly the films of Akira Kurosawa. He stated, “But we had also been talking about wanting to do something in Japan, about Japan, something related to our shared love of Japanese cinema, especially [Akira] Kurosawa. The story could’ve taken place anywhere, but it came together when we realized it should take place in a fantasy version of Japan.”
