= Ryutaro Nonomura =

Japanese politician and convicted fraudster (born 1966)

- 野々村 竜太郎

Member of the Hyogo Prefectural Assembly
- In office June 11, 2011 – July 11, 2014
- Constituency: Nishinomiya City

Personal details
- Born: July 29, 1966 (age 60) Osaka, Japan
- Party: Independent (2008–2011); Nishinomiya Restoration Association (2011–2012); Nishinomiya's Goddess of Hope (2012–2013); The Last Hope (2013–2014); The Last Hope Regional Party (2014)
- Criminal details
- Criminal information
- Criminal charges: Expenses fraud and misuse of funding
- Penalty: 3 years imprisonment 4 years suspended sentence

Ryutaro Nonomura (野々村 竜太郎, Nonomura Ryūtarō; born July 29, 1966) is a Japanese former politician and convicted fraudster known for his crying outburst during a press conference in 2014. Being elected to the Hyogo Prefectural Assembly in 2011, Nonomura had a short legislative career before resigning in 2014 due to a financing scandal. His press conference became an internet meme due to his hysterical crying after being asked to explain his finances. In 2016, he was sentenced to three years in prison and four years suspended sentence for expenses fraud and misuse of funding.

== Early life and education ==
Nonomura was born on July 29, 1966, in Osaka, graduating from Osaka Prefectural Kitano High School and entering Kansai University, later becoming an advisor for the Hyogo Prefectural Office Shurei-kai, organized by Kansai University graduates. After graduating, he was employed as a public employee at Kawanishi City Hall for 15 years, a job he left in order to pursue politics.

== Political career ==
After seeing the election of Tōru Hashimoto, who went to the same school as him, he retired from civil service in November 2007 and decided to become a politician. He first ran for Mayor of Taishi in 2008, but lost against two other candidates in a landslide. He ran three more times for office, twice for Mayor of Nishinomiya and once for Hyogo Prefectural Assembly, but also lost.

In April 2011, Nonomura ran for Hyogo Prefectural Assembly for the Nishinomiya City constituency, which consisted of seven seats up for election. He went under the party Nishinomiya Restoration Party, and with 11,291 votes, Nonomura was elected as an assembly member. As an assemblymember, he was active as a nonpartisan politician.

On June 30, 2014, the Kobe Shimbun reported that Nonomura spent 5.64 million yen on political activity expenses during the 2013 fiscal year, exceeding the average of 5.22 million yen spent by most assembly members, which included multiple trips to an onsen in Toyooka as well as multiple trips to Sayō. It was later determined that it would be impossible for Nonomura to attend all trips, with Nonomura's private schedules having no indication of multiple trips.

=== Conference outburst ===
On July 2, 2014, Nonomura called a press conference about his visits, answering most of the reporters' questions by giving vague answers and saying "I don't remember". When he was asked by a reporter to explain the allegations against him, Nonomura started crying and "uttering nonsensical phrases and banging on the desk". Video of his crying went viral, being played repeatedly by multiple Japanese television stations and being viewed by more than 730,000 people on YouTube.

After the conference, Assembly chairman Tadao Kajitani and members of the Liberal Democratic Party demanded his resignation, and on July 11, 2014, amid an investigation into his scandal and new charges for fraud, he resigned from the Assembly.

== Post-legislative career ==
After resigning from the assembly, he lived with his parents in their apartment in Suminoe-ku, Osaka, and refunded the public funds that were defrauded.

In August 2015, Nonomura was indicted without detention for fraud and the preparation and use of false official documents with a false seal. In January 2016, the Kobe District Court took steps to ensure that he would show up to court after he failed to show up on November 24, saying that his mental condition and the media prevented him from leaving his house. He made his first appearance in court on January 26, pleading not guilty and denying making false statements in his funding reports. In July 2016, Nonomura was sentenced to three years in prison and suspension for four years for expenses fraud. That same year, his crying outburst was parodied by the anime Gintama, where Gintoki Sakata apologized for the series not ending properly and announced that there would be a new season.

In 2024, Nonomura started a radio talk show and an online love consultation service.

== Electoral history ==
2008 Taishi mayoral election
| Party | Candidate | Votes | % |
|---|---|---|---|
| Independent | Masahiro Shuto (incumbent) | 8,009 | 58.62 |
| Independent | Takahiro Ueyama | 5,267 | 38.56 |
| Independent | Ryutaro Nonomura | 485 | 2.82 |
| Total votes | | 13,661 | 100.00 |

2008 Nishinomiya mayoral election
| Party | Candidate | Votes | % |
|---|---|---|---|
| Independent | Satoshi Yamada (incumbent) | 47,515 | 39.72 |
| Independent | Yonetaro Yagi | 21,151 | 17.68 |
| Independent | Naozumi Atoda | 18,651 | 15.59 |
| Independent | Takayuki Fujii | 13,736 | 11.48 |
| Independent | Seiji Tsukada | 12,395 | 10.36 |
| Independent | Ryutaro Nonomura | 6,184 | 5.17 |
| Total votes | | 119,632 | 100.00 |

2009 Hyogo Prefectural Assembly by-election in Nishinomiya
| Party | Candidate | Votes | % |
|---|---|---|---|
| Independent | Ohmae Haruyo | 41,748 | 36.64 |
| JCP | Keiko Isomi | 38,823 | 34.08 |
| Independent | Ryutaro Nonomura | 33,359 | 29.28 |
| Total votes | | 113,930 | 100.00 |

2010 Nishinomiya mayoral election
| Party | Candidate | Votes | % |
|---|---|---|---|
| Independent | Masahiro Kohno | 48,816 | 40.37 |
| Independent | Shigeo Ohmae | 46,168 | 38.18 |
| Independent | Ryutaro Nonomura | 25,924 | 21.45 |
| Total votes | | 120,908 | 100.00 |

2011 Hyogo Prefectural Assembly by-election in Nishinomiya
| Party | Candidate | Votes | % |
|---|---|---|---|
| New Kōmeitō | Yutaka Noguchi (incumbent) | 21,207 | 15.26 |
| Independent | Ohmae Haruyo (incumbent) | 20,109 | 14.47 |
| JCP | Keiko Isomi | 16,652 | 11.98 |
| LDP | Yasutoshi Kitagawa (incumbent) | 16,601 | 11.94 |
| Democratic | Masafumi Kuriyama | 13,445 | 9.67 |
| Democratic | Sumie Kakemizu (incumbent) | 11,491 | 8.27 |
| Nishinomiya Restoration Association | Ryutaro Nonomura | 11,291 | 8.12 |
| LDP | Nobuo Tsutsui (incumbent) | 10,882 | 7.83 |
| LDP | Akihiro Tanaka (incumbent) | 9,503 | 6.84 |
| Democratic | Tatsuo Iwasaki | 7,832 | 5.63 |
| Total votes | | 139,013 | 100.00 |
