= Junko Abe =

Japanese actress (born 1993)

- 阿部 純子
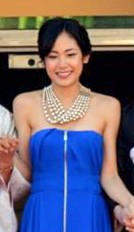
- Abe in 2014
- Born: May 7, 1993 (age 33); Osaka, Japan
- Other name: Jun Yoshinaga
- Occupations: Actress, model
- Years active: 2010–present
- Agent: Amuse Inc.
- Children: 1
- Website: www.amuse.co.jp/artist/A8759

Junko Abe (阿部純子, Abe Junko) (born May 7, 1993) formerly known by her stage name Jun Yoshinaga (吉永淳, Yoshinaga Jun), is a Japanese actress and model.

== Early life ==
Abe was born on May 7, 1993, in Osaka. She attended at the Osaka Prefectural Kitano High School, where she was part of the Aikido team. While in high school, she was involved in Japanese dance, scuba diving and playing piano. She was also part of the high school brass band, where she played flute. In March 2017, she graduated from the Faculty of Environment and Information Studies at Keio University in Tokyo.

== Career ==
While at elementary school, she was discovered and signed on by an agent. She made her debut as an advertising model for Hankyu Department Store. In middle school, she worked as a model for a fashion magazine and later worked as an image character for the Fuji TV anime series Shion no Ō.

In 2010, she made her acting debut in the movie The Chasing World 2 (リアル鬼ごっこ2), as the heroine. She started using her stage name Jun Yoshinaga. In 2012, she played as one of the main casts in the Japanese comedy-drama television series Perfect Son. As a result of her role in the series, she garnered attention and the number of access to her official blog grew.

In 2014, she starred in the movie Still the Water directed by Naomi Kawase. She was selected as the cast for the movie, due to her experience in scuba diving during her time in high school, at "the beauty of swimming" audition in Amami Ōshima. For her performance in the movie, she received the Best Actress Award at the Sakhalin International Film Festival and Best New Actress Award at the Takasaki Film Festival.

In August 2014, Abe took a career break and quit her acting agency to head to the United States for a year to study English and Drama at New York University. While studying at the NYU Tisch School of the Arts, she met her acting agency staff and returned to Japan in 2015. Following her return to Japan, she started to use her birth name as stage name. Abe auditioned for NHK TV serial Toto Neechan and was cast for the role of heroine's friend, Aya Nakada.

In 2019, she starred in movie The Prisoner of Sakura, a Japan-Russia co-production, which was based on the true story of a war prison in Matsuyama, Ehime Prefecture, during the Russo-Japanese War. In the movie, she has a dual role.

== Filmography ==
=== Films ===
- The Chasing World 2 (2010) – Sato Ai
- Wasao (2011) - Tagawa Maki
- A Man With Style (2011) - Miyata Momoko
- Tonnerura de Boo (2011) - Sakiko Toyama
- In the City of Dawn (2011) - young Nakanishi Akiba
- Lifeline (2014) - main role
- My Hawaiian Discovery (2014) - Mako
- Still the Water (2014) - Kyoko
- Home Away From Home (2014) - Akiko
- The Limit of Sleeping Beauty (2017) - Maria
- Dawn Wind in My Poncho (2017) - Maria
- The Blood of Wolves (2018) - Momoko Okada
- The Man From the Sea (2018) - Sachiko
- Samurai Marathon (2018) - Shiori Uesugi
- The Prisoner of Sakura (2019) - Yui Takeda / Sakurako Takamiya
- I Don't Want to Be Like You (2019)
- Daughters (2020) - Kiyokawa Ayano
- The Voice of Sin (2020) - young Sone Mayumi
- 461 Days of Bento: A Promise Between Father and Son (2020) - Yajima Maka
- Baragaki: Unbroken Samurai (2021) - Itosato
- A Dog Named Palma (2021) - Akita Dog Museum staff
- Ring Wandering (2022) - Midori / Kozue
- Yes, I Can't Swim (2022) - Namie
- Miss Osaka (2022)
- Remember to Breathe (2022)

=== Television ===
- Drama W Beat (2011) – Terumi Higuchi
- Perfect Son (2012) - Hyouzuka Masako
- Rumic Theater (2012) - Hazuki Fuwa
- Special Spy Zone (2012) - Kitagawa Natsumi
- Gozen 3-ji no Muhōchitai (2013) - Haruka
- In the Room (2013) - Narukawa Rui
- Toto Neechan (2016) - Aya Nakada
- A Girl & Three Sweethearts (2016) - Ishikawa Wakaba
- Tales of the Unusual Story Autumn Special Edition (2016) - Natsuki Tokita
- Osaka Kanjousen Part 2 (2017) - Fujimoto Asahi
- 4-go Keibi (2017) - Ueno Yu
- I Will Threaten You From Now On (2017) - Momoka Kobashi
- Tokyo Vampire Hotel (2017) - Yui
- Swab (2018) - Faculty role
- Caseworker's Diary (2018) - Kataoka Mari
- Heisei Bashiru (2018) - Ayaka Ekuni
- BRIDGE Begins on 1995.1.17 Kobe (2019) - Ritsu Takeda
- Fruits Takuhaibin (2019) - Sumomo
- Sasurai Onsen (2019) - Yabe Junko
- No Side Manager (2019) - Fujishima Rena
- Really Scary Story (2019) - Asuka Miyazaki
- Shiyakusho (2019) - Imoto Midori
- Keiji to Kenji - Shokatsu to Chiken no 24ji (2019) - Ishida Kiriko
- Papa ga Mo Ichido Koi wo Shita (2020) - Kawakami Yukari
- Sunday Prime Funny Detective (2020) - Rena Gazuma
- Baby Boyfriends (2020) - Yoko
- Tantei Yuri Rintaro (2020) - Kawase Fumino
- Dakara Watashi wa Make Suru (2020) - Kawamatsu Yasuko
- Ochoyan (2020–21) - Wakasaki Yoko

=== Online ===
- Nestlé Theater on YouTube "Day and Night" (2014) - Shiori Haneda

=== Commercials ===
- Suntory - C.C. Lemon (April 2011)
- Haruyama Trading Co., Ltd. (February 2013)
- Starbucks
- Odakyu Electric Railway (August 11, 2017)
- ABC-Mart - Asics/Asics GEL-PROMESA (January 25, 2018)
- Daily Yamazaki (February 2018)

=== Radio drama ===
- FM Radio Drama Retake Sixteen - Starring Saori Komine (NHK FM, 26 August 2013 - 13 September 2013)

=== Music videos ===
- Tatsuro Yamashita - Cheer Up! The Summer (2016)
- MOROHA - Revolution (2018)
- Mr. Children - Gravity and Breath (2018)
