= Softly (Tatsuro Yamashita album) =

Studio album by Tatsuro Yamashita
- Released: June 22, 2022
- Length: 64:12
- Label: Warner/Moon
- Producer: Tatsuro Yamashita

Tatsuro Yamashita chronology
Artisan (30th Anniversary Edition) (2021)	Softly (2022)

Professional ratings
Review scores
Source	Rating
Pitchfork	7.4/10

Softly is the fourteenth studio album by Japanese singer-songwriter Tatsuro Yamashita, released on June 22, 2022. It has been certified platinum by RIAJ in July 2022, for sales of over 250,000 copies.

== Overview ==
Softly was Yamashita's first new studio album in 11 years since Ray of Hope in August 2011. In addition to single songs such as "Hikari to Kimi e no Requiem", "Cheer Up! The Summer", "Reborn", "Mirai no Theme", and "Recipe", the album contains 15 songs including "Lehua, My Love" and "Shining from the Inside", which were previously used as CM songs. All the songs that have already been released will have new mixes. The title "Softly" expresses Tatsuro Yamashita's earnest desire to gently and softly wrap up this turbulent era with music.

On April 1, 2022, a special site and an announcement trailer video was made on YouTube.

== Artwork ==
The jacket uses a portrait of Yamashita drawn by Mari Yamazaki, a manga artist known for Thermae Romae. Yamazaki had studied painting in Italy, majoring in oil painting and art history, and had always dreamt of painting a portrait.

== Track listing ==
=== Standard edition ===
All lyrics are written by Tatsuro Yamashita, except where noted; all music is composed by Tatsuro Yamashita.

CD and cassette track listing
No.	Title	Lyrics	Music	Length
1.	"Phoenix" (フェニックス; 2021 version)			1:01
2.	"Love's on Fire"			4:09
3.	"Mirai no Theme" (ミライのテーマ)			4:18
4.	"Recipe" (レシピ)			3:38
5.	"Cheer Up! The Summer"			4:18
6.	"Jinriki Hikoki" (人力飛行機; Human Powered Aircraft)			4:20
7.	"Uta no Kisha" (うたのきしゃ)			5:50
8.	"Shining from the Inside"	Nana Hatori	Tatsuro Yamashita	3:29
9.	"Lehua, My Love"			5:12
10.	"Oppression Blues" (弾圧のブルース)			3:58
11.	"Composition" (コンポジション)			5:13
12.	"You" (ユー)			4:34
13.	"Angel of the Light"	Alan O'Day	Tatsuro Yamashita	4:15
14.	"Hikari to Kimi e no Requiem" (光と君へのレクイエム)			3:46
15.	"Reborn" (リボーン)			6:03
Total length:				64:12

Limited edition bonus disc

All lyrics are written by Tatsuro Yamashita, except where noted; all music is composed by Tatsuro Yamashita, except where noted.

CD (bonus tracks): The Latest Acoustic Live: Recorded Live, 2021/12/03 at Tokyo FM Hall, Tokyo
No.	Title	Lyrics	Music	Length
1.	"Tānā no Kikansha" (ターナーの汽罐車)			5:47
2.	"Pocket Music" (ポケット・ミュージック)			5:52
3.	"Amaku Kiken na Kaori" (あまく危険な香り)			4:34
4.	"Paper Doll"			6:22
5.	"Parade" (パレード)			4:17
6.	"Bella Note"	Sonny Burke, Peggy Lee	Sonny Burke, Peggy Lee	3:22
7.	"Have Yourself a Merry Little Christmas"	Hugh Martin, Ralph Blane	Hugh Martin, Ralph Blane	2:52
Total length:				33:06

=== LP edition ===
Side A
No.	Title	Length
1.	"Phoenix" (フェニックス; 2021 version)
2.	"Love's on Fire"
3.	"Mirai no Theme" (ミライのテーマ)
4.	"Recipe" (レシピ)

Side B
No.	Title	Length
1.	"Cheer Up! The Summer"
2.	"Jinriki Hikoki" (人力飛行機; Human Powered Aircraft)
3.	"Uta no Kisha" (うたのきしゃ)

Side C
No.	Title	Length
1.	"Shining from the Inside"
2.	"Lehua, My Love"
3.	"Oppression Blues" (弾圧のブルース)
4.	"Composition" (コンポジション)

Side D
No.	Title	Length
1.	"You" (ユー)
2.	"Angel of the Light"
3.	"Hikari to Kimi e no Requiem" (光と君へのレクイエム)
4.	"Reborn" (リボーン)

== Personnel ==
Phoenix (フェニックス)

- Tatsuro Yamashita: Lead Vocals, Percussion, Backing Vocals
- Shigeaki Hashimoto: Computer Programming & Synthesizer Operation

Love's On Fire

- Tatsuro Yamashita: Lead Vocals, Drum Programming, Computer Programming, Electric Guitar, Keyboards, Percussion, Backing Vocals
- Shigeaki Hashimoto: Computer Programming & Synthesizer Operation

Mirai no Theme (ミライのテーマ)

- Tatsuro Yamashita: Lead Vocals, Computer Programming, Acoustic Guitar, Electric Guitar, Keyboards, Percussion & Background Vocals
- Takumi Ogasawara: Drums
- Koki Ito - Electric Bass
- Hiroyuki Namba: Acoustic Piano
- Yota Miyazato: Alto Sax Solo
- Shigeaki Hashimoto: Computer Programming & Synthesizer Operation

Recipe (レシピ)

- Tatsuro Yamashita: Lead Vocals, Computer Programming, Electric Guitar, Keyboards, Percussion, Backing Vocals
- Shigeaki Hashimoto: Computer Programming & Synthesizer Operation

Cheer Up! The Summer

- Tatsuro Yamashita: Lead Vocals, Computer Programming, Drum Programming, Electric Guitar, Ukulele, Bouzouki, Keyboards, Percussion, Backing Vocals
- Taro Makido: String Arrangement
- Shigeaki Hashimoto: Computer Programming & Synthesizer Operation
- Hitoshi Kono: Strings Concert Master

Jinriki Hikoki" (人力飛行機; Human Powered Aircraft)

- Tatsuro Yamashita: Lead Vocals, Acoustic Guitar, Keyboards, Percussion, Backing Vocals
- Yutaka Uehara: Drums
- Koki Ito: Electric Bass
- Yoshiyuki Sahashi: Electric Guitar
- Hiroyuki Namba: Acoustic Piano
- Shigeaki Hashimoto: Computer Programming & Synthesizer Operation

Uta no Kisha (うたのきしゃ)

- Tatsuro Yamashita: Lead Vocals, Computer Programming, Drum Programming, Acoustic Guitar, Electric Guitar, Keyboards, Percussion & Background Vocals
- Koki Ito: Electric Bass
- Hiroyuki Namba: Acoustic Piano, Electric Piano
- Youichi Murata: Trombone
- Koji Nishimura: Trumpet
- Takuo Yamamoto: Tenor Sax & Baritone Sax
- Shigeaki Hashimoto: Computer Programming & Synthesizer Operation

Shining From The Inside

- Tatsuro Yamashita: Lead Vocals, Keyboards, Percussion, Backing Vocals
- Shigeaki Hashimoto: Computer Programming & Synthesizer Operation

Lehua, My Love

- Tatsuro Yamashita: Lead Vocals, Computer Programming, Drum Programming, Electric Guitar, Keyboards, Synthesizer, Percussion, Backing Vocals
- Shigeaki Hashimoto: Computer Programming & Synthesizer Operation

Oppression Blues (弾圧のブルース)

- Tatsuro Yamashita: Lead Vocals, Acoustic Guitar, Electric Guitar, Keyboards, Percussion, Backing Vocals
- Yutaka Uehara: Drums
- Koki Ito: Electric Bass
- Hiroyuki Namba: Acoustic Piano, Electric Piano
- Shigeaki Hashimoto: Computer Programming & Synthesizer Operation

Composition (コンポジション)

- Tatsuro Yamashita: Lead Vocals, Electric Guitar, Computer Programming, Drum Programming, Keyboards, Percussion, Backing Vocals
- Shigeaki Hashimoto: Computer Programming & Synthesizer Operation

You (= ユー)

- Tatsuro Yamashita: Lead Vocals, Acoustic Guitar, Percussion, Backing Vocals
- Koki Ito: Electric Bass
- Yoshiyuki Sahashi: Electric Guitar
- Hiroyuki Namba: Acoustic Piano, Electric Piano
- Shigeaki Hashimoto: Computer Programming & Synthesizer Operation

Angel Of The Light

- Tatsuro Yamashita: Lead Vocals, Electric Guitar, Keyboards, Percussion, Backing Vocals
- Yoshiyuki Sahashi: Electric Guitar
- Shigeaki Hashimoto: Computer Programming & Synthesizer Operation

Hikari to Kimi e no Requiem (光と君へのレクイエム)

- Tatsuro Yamashita: Lead Vocals, Computer Programming, Drum Programming, Electric Guitar, Acoustic Guitar, Keyboards, Percussion, Backing Vocals
- Shigeaki Hashimoto: Computer Programming & Synthesizer Operation

Reborn (リボーン)

- Tatsuro Yamashita: Lead Vocals, Computer Programming, Drum Programming, Electric Guitar, Acoustic Guitar, Bouzouki, Keyboards, Percussion, Backing Vocals
- Suginami Junior Chorus: Backing Vocals
- Masanori Kusakabe: Electric Guitar
- Shigeaki Hashimoto: Computer Programming & Synthesizer Operation

== Charts ==
=== Weekly charts ===
Weekly chart performance for Softly
Chart (2022)	Peak position
Japanese Albums (Oricon)	1
Japanese Combined Albums (Oricon)	1
Japanese Hot Albums (Billboard Japan)	2

=== Monthly charts ===
Monthly chart performance for Softly
Chart (2022)	Peak position
Japanese Albums (Oricon)	4

=== Year-end charts ===
Year-end chart performance for Softly
Chart (2022)	Position
Japanese Hot Albums (Billboard Japan)	19

== Release history ==
Release history and formats for Softly
Country	Date	Label	Format	Catalog number
Japan	June 22, 2022	Warner/Moon	CD	WPCL-13361
Japan	June 22, 2022	Warner/Moon	2×CD	WPCL-13359/60 [Limited edition]
Japan	June 22, 2022	Warner/Moon	2×LP	WPJL-10155/6
Japan	June 22, 2022	Warner/Moon	CT	WPTL-10004
