= Kunichi Nomura =

Japanese writer and radio personality

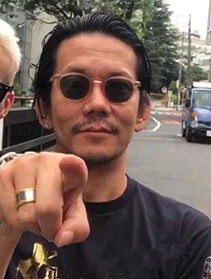
- Born: Kunichi Nomura 野村 訓市; April 10, 1974 (age 52); Tokyo, Japan
- Other name: Kun
- Education: Keio University (BA)
- Occupations: writer, actor, radio personality, book editor, interior designer, casting director, and dj
- Years active: 1999–present
- Spouse: Mayumi Sada
- Parent: Kokuko Nomura
- Relatives: Yuri Nomura (sister)

Kunichi Nomura (野村 訓市, Nomura Kun'ichi; born April 10, 1974) is a Japanese writer, actor, radio personality, book editor, interior designer, creative director, and DJ from Tokyo, Japan.

== Early life ==
Kun's mother is food researcher, Kouko Nomura, and his sister is chef and restaurateur, Yuri Nomura. His great-grandfather on his father's side is journalist Fumio Nomura.

Kun enrolled in Gakushuin kindergarten at the age of six and went on to spend most of his school years at Gakushuin until graduating high school in 1992. During his junior year in high school, he studied abroad in Texas for a year. Upon his return to Japan, he enrolled in Keio University's Faculty of Policy Management, although he spent most of his junior and senior years backpacking in Asia and Europe.

Upon his return to Japan from his extensive travels, Kun opened a beach café called Sputnik at Tsujidō Kaigan in 1999, which he operated until 2005. After being influenced by The Electric Kool-Aid Acid Test, and Ken Kesey's Further bus trip in the mid 60s, Kun purchased a double-decker bus from London in 2004 and went on a journey with photographers, skateboarders, artists, writers and DJs, traveling from the most northern point to the southern tip of Japan, producing events and parties along the way.

== Career ==
In 2000, Kun published a book called Sputnik: Whole Life Catalogue, a collection of interviews of 86 artists from all over the world, focusing on their perspective on life and work. This book launched Kun's career as a freelance magazine writer and editor for several major publications, covering a wide range of topics from subculture, fashion, architecture, film, music, photography, and art. During this time, he interviewed over a hundred notable figures including Wes Anderson, Spike Jonze, Gus Van Sant, Jonathan Ive, Marc Newson, Richard Hutten, Ken Kesey, Haruki Murakami, Raymond Pettibon, and Barry McGee.

In 2004, Kun founded an interior design company called Tripster Inc., that mainly designs offices, stores and restaurants, although the company took on a wide range of other projects such as producing a Bruce Weber photography exhibition, a GAP campaign event, advising on Beams Japan's catalogues, and designing event spaces for Uniqlo and Nike. It was around this time that Kun started producing music events with artists such as Kenji Takimi, The Avalanches, DJ Milo, 2 Many DJs, Yamantaka Eye of Boredoms, and James Murphy of LCD Soundsystem.

From 2015, Kun became creative director of sub culture magazine Studio Voice and stayed at the position until 2017.

Kun has made cameo appearances in several high profile films such as Sofia Coppola's Lost in Translation and Wes Anderson's movies The Grand Budapest Hotel and Isle of Dogs. For the latter, Kun is credited as a co-writer and casting director, while also voicing the character, Mayor Kobayashi.

Since 2014, Kun has been hosting a weekly radio show called Antenna presents: Travelling Without Moving on J-Wave primarily sharing his stories from his extensive travels and playing an eclectic mix of music to go with his stories.

== Filmography ==
=== Film ===
- Lost in Translation (2003) – Kun
- The Grand Budapest Hotel (2014) – Actor
- Isle of Dogs (2018) – Mayor Kobayashi (voice) - Actor and co-writer (story only, with Wes Anderson, Roman Coppola and Jason Schwartzman)
