= Osaka Prefectural Kitano High School =

- 大阪府立北野高等学校
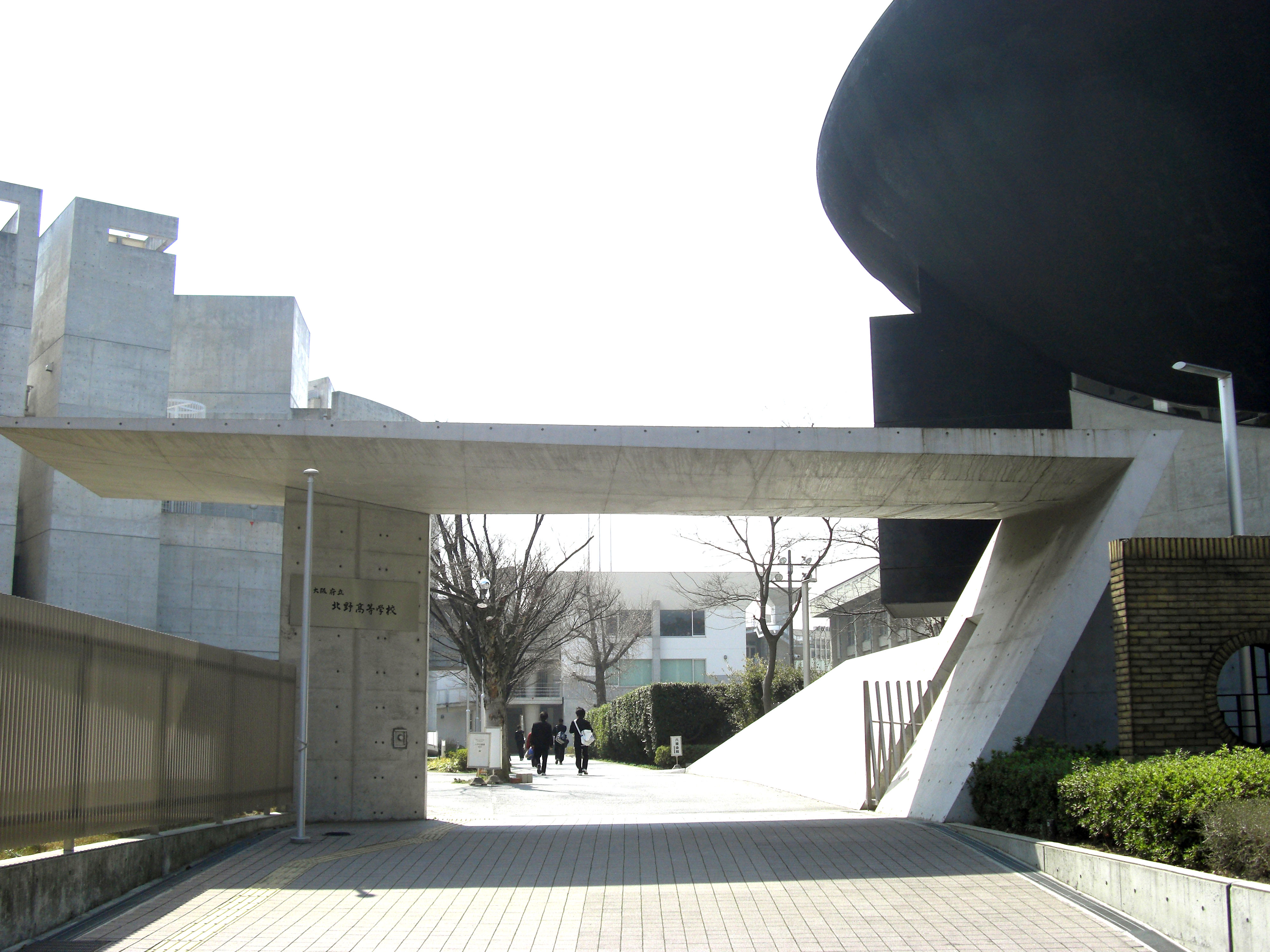

Location
- 2-5-13, Shin-Kitano, Yodogawa-ku; Osaka, 532-0025; Japan
- Coordinates: 34°42′56″N 135°28′41″E

Information
- Former names: European-style school Osaka Prefectural First Secondary High School; Osaka Prefectural Kitano Secondary High School; Osaka Prefectural Kitano Senior High School
- Established: 1873; 153 years ago
- Authority: Osaka Prefecture
- School code: 27101C
- Website: www.osaka-c.ed.jp/kitano/90english/index-en.html

Osaka Prefectural Kitano High School (大阪府立北野高等学校, Ōsaka Furitsu Kitano Kōtōgakkō) is a secondary school in Osaka, Japan founded in 1873.

It moved to its current location in Yodogawa Ward in 1931. The school is operated by the Osaka Prefectural Board of Education. It has been named a model school by the Ministry of Education, Culture, Sports, Science and Technology.

== History ==
Kitano High School was founded as a European-style school at Namba Mido in 1873, and re-established as Osaka Prefectural First Secondary High School in 1877. In 1889, the school was moved to the new building to at Dojima, and in the same year a school logo was created. In 1902, the school was moved again to Kitano, and was renamed Osaka Prefectural Kitano Secondary High School. After 29 years, the school was moved to the current location.

After World War II, in 1948, the school was renamed Osaka Prefectural Kitano Senior High School, and began to exchange students and teachers with Osaka Prefectural Otemae High School.

== Alumni ==
Prominent alumni include:

- Junko Abe, actress
- Den Fujita, founder of McDonald's Company (Japan), Ltd
- Tōru Hashimoto, former mayor of Osaka City
- Osamu Hayaishi, winner of the Wolf Prize in Medicine
- Motojirō Kajii, author
- Kenji Kasahara
- Shika Kawajo, politician
- Toshiya Kuge (1981–2001), 20-year-old September 11 victim
- Ryōichi Kuroda, politician
- Midori Matsushima, politician
- Hisaya Morishige, actor and comedian
- Hiroshi Noma, author
- Ryutaro Nonomura, former politician
- Yuzo Saeki, painter
- Osamu Tezuka (1928–1989), manga artist
- Tamiki Wakaki, manga artist
- Hidetsugu Yagi (1886–1976), inventor of the Yagi Antenna
- Kanae Yamamoto, politician
