= The Prisoner of Sakura =

- Film poster
- Kanji: ソローキンの見た桜
- Russian: В плену у сакуры
- Directed by: Masaki Inoue
- Screenplay by: Masaki Inoue; Shunsuke Katori
- Produced by: Yumiko Masuda; Irina Inoue; Keisuke Shimizu; Hitoshi Endo
- Starring: Junko Abe; Rodion Galyuchenko; Yoko Yamamoto; Aleksandr Domogarov; Naomasa Musaka; Masayuki Yuhara; Hana Ebise; Setsuko Kaida; Jtaro Sugisaku; Takumi Saitoh; Issey Ogata
- Cinematography: Tomoaki Iwakura
- Music by: Hiroyuki Onogawa; Ivan Sintsov; Alim Zairov
- Distributed by: Kadokawa Pictures; Heisei Project
- Release date: March 22, 2019 (Japan)
- Running time: 111 minutes
- Countries: Japan; Russia
- Languages: Japanese; Russian
- Box office: $1,635

The Prisoner of Sakura (Japanese: ソローキンの見た桜, Hepburn: Sorokin no mita saka) (Russian: В плену у сакуры, V plenu u sakury) is a 2019 Japanese war film directed by Masaki Inoue. A joint Japan-Russia co-production, the movie is based on the true story of a prison camp in Matsuyama, Ehime Prefecture, during the Russo-Japanese War.

== Plot ==
In the present day, a journalist named Sakurako Takamiya works for a local TV station. She researches into the Russian prisoners of war cemetery that local students keep clean. Her boss Shiro Kurata tells her about a letter from Russian Army officer named Alexander Sorokin, which was addressed to a nurse named Yui Takeda. They travel to Russia to look into Sorokin's diary.

In 1904, during the Russo-Japanese War, Yui takes care of the injured Sorokin at a prisoner of war camp in Matsuyama, Ehime Prefecture, Japan. At first, Yui hates Sorokin, because her younger brother died in the war. Her feelings change, as they fall in love under difficult circumstances.

== Cast ==
- Junko Abe as Yui Takeda/Sakurako Takamiya
- Rodion Galyuchenko as Alexander Sorokin
- Yoko Yamamoto as Kikue Takamiya
- Aleksandr Domogarov as Captain Vasily Boysman
- Andrei Dementiev as Alexander Svyatopolk-mirsky
- Naomasa Musaka as Yukichi Takeda
- Hana Ebise as Naka Takeda
- Setsuko Kaida as Take Takeda
- Ivan Gromov as Alexey Krushinsky
- Issey Ogata as Commandant Kono
- Takumi Saitoh as Shiro Kurata
- Jtarô Sugisaku as TV cameraman
- Rii Ishihara

== Reception ==
The movie was screened at the opening of the Ehime International Film Festival pre-event on March 15, 2019. After being pre-released at a movie theater in Ehime Prefecture from the following 16th, it was released nationwide from 22nd. According to a survey by Kogyo Tsushinsha, it won first place in the mini theater audience mobilization ranking on March 22 and 23. In November 2019, the movie was released in 200 movie theatres across Russia.

At overseas film festivals, it was screened at the out of competition section of the 41st Moscow International Film Festival on April 24, 2019. It was screened in the competition section of the 12th Orenburg International Film Festival held in Orenburg, Russia from August 23 to 28, and won the Audience Grand Prix Special Award. On November, the movie won the Russia-Japan Friendship Contribution Award at the Russian Overseas Film Festival.
