= Nijirō Murakami =

Japanese actor and voice actor (born 1997)

Nijiro Murakami
- 村上 虹郎
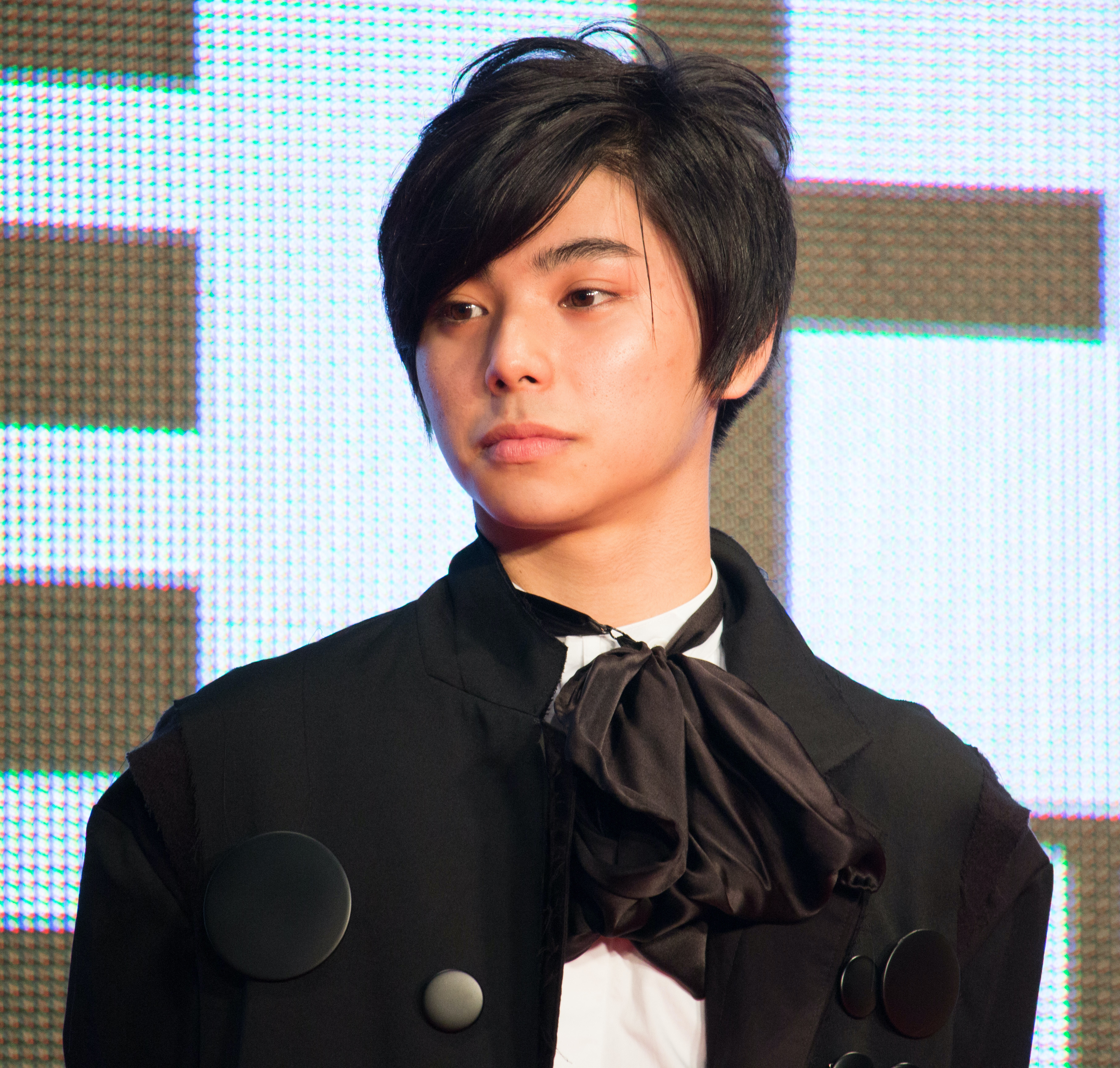
- Murakami at the 28th Tokyo International Film Festival in 2015
- Born: March 17, 1997 (age 29); Tokyo, Japan
- Occupations: Actor; voice actor
- Years active: 2014–present
- Agent: Decade
- Parents: Jun Murakami (father); Ua (mother)
- Website: Official website

Nijiro Murakami (村上 虹郎, Murakami Nijirō; born March 17, 1997) is a Japanese actor and voice actor. He is best known for his role as Kaito in the 2014 romance film Still the Water, which was selected to compete for the Palme d'Or at the 2014 Cannes Film Festival. Murakami's role in Last of the Wolves (2021) received critical acclaim and earned him a Best Supporting Actor nomination at the 45th Japan Academy Film Prize. He also gained international recognition for his role as Shuntaro Chishiya in Netflix survival series Alice in Borderland (2020-2025).

== Early life and career ==
Murakami was born on March 17, 1997, in Tokyo, Japan. He is the only son of actor Jun Murakami and singer Ua. His parents divorced when he was nine years old and he grew up with his mother, stepfather, and three younger half-siblings. While still attending preparatory school, he moved to Okinawa with his family. Murakami also studied for years in Montreal, Canada.

Murakami debuted in 2014, portraying the main role of Kaito in the award-winning film Still the Water, for which he received the Best Newcomer Award at the 29th Takasaki Film Festival. In 2015, Murakami debuted in the television series Tenshi no Naifu. That same year, he later starred in the live action adaptation of the anime Anohana, as well as the film Wasurenai to Chikatta Boku ga Ita.

As a voice actor, Murakami is best known for voicing Hiro Shishigami in the anime adaptation of the Inuyashiki manga.

== Personal life ==
=== Health ===
In 2023, Murakami went on hiatus for mental and physical health issues, being absent from the Tokyo Revengers 2 red carpet event and dropping out of the stage play Evangelion Beyond.

He resumed activities in 2025, having only a cameo in the Singapore-Japanese co-production Lost and Found and the third season of Alice in Borderland.

=== Domestic violence accusations ===
Murakami's ex–girlfriend accused him in early 2026 of domestic violence. The woman alleged there were at least four incidents from March to May 2024 in which he had hit her, pulled her hair, slammed her head against a window, and punched her in the face. According to reports, her injuries had taken at least a month to heal. Murakami admitted to injuring her in his questioning by the Tokyo Metropolitan Police Agency.

After the news of the assault came out, TV Tokyo was considering what to do with the opening episode of the upcoming horror anthology series Strange –Junji Ito’s Strange Stories That Keep You Up at Night, airing on July 3, 2026, in which he was scheduled to appear.

Murakami posted an apology on X to his fans on June 28, 2026.

== Filmography ==
=== Film ===
Year	Title	Role	Notes	Ref.
2014	Still the Water	Kaito	Lead role	
2014	As the Gods Will	Haruhiko Yoshikawa		
2015	Forget Me Not	Takashi Hayama	Lead role	
2015	Sayonara	Yamashita		
2016	Destruction Babies	Shōta Ashihara		
2016	The Firefly Summers	Kimihide		
2016	Kuroi Bōdō			
2017	Mukoku	Tōru Haneda		
2017	Second Summer, Never See You Again	Satoshi Shinohara	Lead role	
2017	Miracles of the Namiya General Store	Shota Kobayashi		
2017	Harunareya	Mikio Nishimura	Short film	
2017	Amy Said	Shunya Hasebe		
2018	Isle of Dogs	Hiroshi (voice)	American film	
2018	Hanalei Bay	Takahashi		
2018	The Gun	Tōru Nishikawa	Lead role	
2019	Chiwawa	Nagai		
2019	They Say Nothing Stays the Same	Genzō		
2019	The Promised Land	Hiro Nogami		
2019	I Was a Secret Bitch	Akira Kojima		
2020	Sasaki in My Mind	Sudo		
2020	Soirée	Shota Iwamatsu	Lead role	
2021	Last of the Wolves	Kōta "Chinta" Chikada		
2021	Baragaki: Unbroken Samurai	Okada Izō		
2021	Rurouni Kenshin: The Beginning	Okita Sōji		
2021	Pretenders	Sekai		
2022	The Hound of the Baskervilles: Sherlock the Movie	Senri Hasukabe		
2023	Tokyo Revengers 2: Bloody Halloween Part 1	Kazutora Hanemiya		
2023	Tokyo Revengers 2: Bloody Halloween Part 2	Kazutora Hanemiya		
2023	Heartless	Aragaki		
2023	Kyrie	Fūkin		
2024	The Yin Yang Master Zero	Tachibana no Yasuie		

=== Television ===
Year	Title	Role	Notes	Ref.
2015	Tenshi no Naifu	Jun Maruyama		
2015	Anohana	Jinta "Jintan" Yadomi	Lead role; television film	
2016	Utsukushiki Mittsu no Uso	Shogo Tachiki	Episode 2	
2016	Shibuya Rei-chōme	Ogito		
2016	Botanical Life of Verandar 3	Keni'ichi Hiiragi	Episode 4	
2016	Brass Dreams	Hiroto Aoshima		
2016	Cold Case: Shinjitsu no Tobira	Ryo Doguchi	Episode 5	
2017	Dead Stock	Riku Tsuneta	Lead role	
2017	Inuyashiki	Hiro Shishigami	Animation	
2018	The Black Company	Ryuichi Kurata		
2018	In This Corner of the World	Tetsu Mizuhara		
2019	Les Misérables: Owari naki Tabiji	Takumi Watanabe	Television film	
2020	MIU 404	Yoshitaka Kosaka	Episode 6	
2020–2025	Alice in Borderland	Shuntaro Chishiya	3 seasons; Main cast season 1-2, guest season 3	
2021	Iki wo Hisomete	Shinpei Miyashita	Episode 3	
2021–2022	Come Come Everybody	Isamu Kijima	Asadora	
2022	10 Count to the Future	Momosuke Saijō		
2022	The Forbidden Magic	Shingo Koshiba	Television film	
2026	Lost and Found	Jay Yamashita	Singaporean-Japanese drama	

== Awards and nominations ==
Award	Year	Category	Nominated work	Result	Ref.
Japan Academy Film Prize	2018	Best Supporting Actor	Mukoku	Nominated	
Japan Academy Film Prize	2022	Best Supporting Actor	Last of the Wolves	Nominated	
Kinema Junpo Awards	2017	Best New Actor	Destruction Babies	Won	
Mainichi Film Awards	2022	Best Supporting Actor	Last of the Wolves	Nominated	
Tama Film Awards	2016	Best New Actor	Destruction Babies, Sayonara, The Firefly Summers	Won	
Tama Film Awards	2016	Special Award (as an ensemble)	Destruction Babies	Won	
Takasaki Film Festival	2015	Best New Actor	Still the Water	Won	
Tokyo International Film Festival	2018	Gemstone Award	The Gun	Won	
Yokohama Film Festival	2017	Best Newcomer	Destruction Babies	Won	
