= Mirai no Theme / Uta no Kisha =

Single by Tatsuro Yamashita

"Mirai no Theme/Uta no Kisha"

Single by Tatsuro Yamashita

from the album Softly
- Released: July 11, 2018
- Genre: Rock; Pop
- Length: 25:32
- Label: Warner/Moon
- Songwriter: Tatsuro Yamashita
- Producer: Tatsuro Yamashita

Tatsuro Yamashita singles chronology
"Reborn" (2017)	"Mirai no Theme/Uta no Kisha" (2018)	"Recipe" (2019)

Alternative cover
- Regular edition cover (WPCL-12893)

Mirai no Theme/Uta no Kisha is the fifty-first single (excluding reissues) released by Japanese singer-songwriter Tatsuro Yamashita, released in July 2018. This work contains two songs by Tatsuro Yamashita for the film "Mirai".

== Overview ==
This was the second time Yamashita produced a song for Mamoru Hosoda since his 2009 film "Summer Wars". Moreover, this was the first time he produced two songs for a movie/drama. Both songs are later included in his 2022 album Softly containing new mixes.

"Mirai no Theme" uses an up-tempo pop tune suitable for the opening of the movie. Meanwhile, The ending theme, "Uta no Kisha" has a bright and sad tune, which is suitable for ending the movie. In addition, a live version of the theme song "Bokura no Natsu no Yume" from the animated movie "Summer Wars" was included in the single.

The artwork of the first limited edition features the main visual of the movie, and the regular edition features "Tatsuro-kun" (drawn by Miki Tori) riding a motorcycle.

== Track listing ==
All lyrics are written by Tatsuro Yamashita; all music is composed by Tatsuro Yamashita.

No.	Title	Length
1.	"ミライのテーマ [Mirai no Theme, Theme of Mirai]"	4:21
2.	"うたのきしゃ [Uta no Kisha, Music Train]"	5:55
3.	"僕らの夏の夢 [Bokura no Natsu no Yume, Our Summer Dream] (Acoustic Live Version)"	5:03
4.	"ミライのテーマ [Mirai no Theme, Theme of Mirai] (Original Karaoke)"	4:21
5.	"うたのきしゃ [Uta no Kisha, Music Train] (Original Karaoke)"	5:52
Total length:		25:32

== Personnel ==
=== ミライのテーマ [Mirai no Theme] ===
- Tatsuro Yamashita: Computer Programming, Acoustic Guitar, Electric Guitar, Percussion & Background Vocals
- Takumi Ogasawara: Drums
- Koki Ito: Electric Bass
- Hiroyuki Namba: Acoustic Piano
- Yota Miyazato: Alto Sax Solo
- Shigeaki Hashimoto: Computer Programming & Synthesizer Operation

=== うたのきしゃ [Uta no Kisha] ===
- Tatsuro Yamashita: Computer Programming, Drum Programming, Acoustic Guitar, Electric Guitar, Keyboards, Percussion & Background
- Koki Ito: Electric Bass
- Hiroyuki Namba: Acoustic Piano
- Youichi Murata: Trombone
- Koji Nishimura: Trumpet
- Takuo Yamamoto: Tenor Sax & Baritone Sax
- Shigeaki Hashimoto: Computer Programming & Synthesizer Operation

=== 僕らの夏の夢 [Bokura no Natsu no Yume] (Acoustic Live Version) ===
- Tatsuro Yamashita: Acoustic Guitar
- Koki Ito: Electric Bass
- Hiroyuki Namba: Acoustic Piano

Recorded Live at Hiroshima Club Quattro. April 25, 2018.

== Charts ==
Chart (2018)	Peak position
Oricon Weekly Singles Chart	12
Billboard Japan Hot 100	6

== Release history ==
Country	Date	Label	Format	Catalog number
Japan	July 11, 2018	Warner/Moon	CD	WPCL-12892 [Limited edition]
Japan	July 11, 2018	Warner/Moon	CD	WPCL-12893 [Regular edition]
Japan	July 20, 2018	Warner/Moon	Digital download	—
