= Osaka Prefectural Board of Education =

Branch of the government of Osaka Prefecture, Japan

Osaka Prefectural Board of Education is a branch of the government of Osaka Prefecture, Japan.

The board supervises individual municipal school systems and directly operates public high schools in Osaka prefecture.

== Schools operated by the prefecture ==
=== High schools operated by the prefecture ===
==== Daito ====
- Nozaki High School
- Ryokufukan High School (Merger of Daito High School and South Neyagawa High School)

==== Fujiidera ====
- Fujiidera High School

==== Habikino ====
- Habikino High School
- Nishiura High School

==== Higashiosaka ====
- Fuse High School
- Fuse North High School
- Hanazono High School
- Ikejima High School
- Kawachino High School

==== Hirakata ====
- Hirakata High School
- Hirakata Nagisa High School
- Hirakata Tsuda High School
- Korigaoka High School
- Makino High School
- Nagao High School

==== Ibaraki ====
- Fukui High School
- Ibaraki High School
- Ibaraki East High School
- Ibaraki West High School
- Kasugaoka High School

==== Ikeda ====
- Ikeda High School
- Ikeda North High School
- Shibutani High School

==== Kadoma ====
- Kadoma West High School

==== Kashiwara ====
- Kashiwara East High School

==== Katano ====
- Katano High School

==== Kawachinagano ====
- Nagano High School
- Nagano North High School

==== Matsubara ====
- Ikuno High School
- Ohtsuka High School

==== Minoh ====
- Minoh High School (Japanese: )

==== Mishima District ====
- Shimamoto High School (Shimamoto)

==== Moriguchi ====
- Moriguchi East High School

==== Neyagawa ====
- East Neyagawa High School
- Neyagawa High School
- West Neyagawa High School

==== Osaka ====
===== Abeno-ku =====
- Abeno High School
- Tennoji High School

===== Asahi-ku =====
- Asahi High School

===== Chūō-ku =====
- Otemae High School

===== Higashiyodogawa-ku =====
- Higashiyodogawa High School

===== Hirano-ku =====
- East Sumiyoshi High School
- Hirano High School

===== Ikuno-ku =====
- Katsuyama High School

===== Minato-ku =====
- Ichioka High School
- Minato High School

===== Nishinari-ku =====
- Nishinari High School

===== Nishiyodogawa-ku =====
- Nishiyodogawa High School

===== Sumiyoshi-ku =====
- Hannan High School
- Yamatogawa High School

===== Taisho-ku =====
- Izuo High School
- Taisho High School

===== Tennoji-ku =====
- Kozu High School
- Shimizudani High School
- Yuhigaoka High School (English: , Japanese: )

===== Tsurumi-ku =====
- Matta High School

===== Yodogawa-ku =====
- Kitano High School
- North Yodo High School

==== Osakasayama ====
- Sayama High School

==== Sakai ====
- Kanaoka High School
- Mihara High School (Japanese: )
- Mikuni Gaoka High School
- Ohtori High School
- Senyo High School
- Tomioka High School (Japanese: )

==== Settsu ====
- Settsu High School
- Torikai High School

==== Shinjonawate ====
- Shijonawate High School
- Shijonawate North High School

==== Suita ====
- Kitasenri High School
- Suita High School
- Suita East High School
- Yamada High School

==== Takatsuki ====
- Abuno High School
- Akutagawa High School
- Mishima High School
- Shimamoto High School
- Ohkanmuri High School
- Takatsuki North High School

==== Tondabayashi ====
- Kanan High School
- Kongo High School
- Tondabayashi High School

==== Toyonaka ====
- East Toyonaka High School
- Sakurazuka High School
- Shoji High School
- Teshima High School
- Toneyama High School
- Toyonaka High School

==== Toyono District ====
- Shiroyama High School (Toyono)

==== Yao ====
- Seiyu High School
- Yamamoto High School
- Yao High School
- Yao Suisho High School

== Former schools ==
- Daito High School (Daito) (merged into Ryokufukan High School)
- Hirakata West High School (Hirakata) (Closed March 31, 2006)
- Isoshima High School (Hirakata)
- Kano High School (Higashiosaka) (Closed March 31, 2006)
- South Neyagawa High School (Neyagawa) (merged into Ryokufukan High School)
- Suminoe High School (Osaka)
- Tatetsu High School (Higashiosaka)

== See also ==
- List of public high schools in Osaka Prefecture (Japanese)
