= Mirai (2018 film) =

2018 Japanese animated film by Mamoru Hosoda

- Theatrical release poster

Japanese name
- Kanji: 未来のミライ
- Literal meaning: Mirai of the future
Transcriptions
- Revised Hepburn: Mirai no Mirai
- Directed by: Mamoru Hosoda
- Written by: Mamoru Hosoda
- Produced by: Yuichiro Saito; Takuya Itō; Yūichi Adachi; Genki Kawamura
- Starring: Moka Kamishiraishi; Haru Kuroki; Gen Hoshino; Kumiko Aso; Mitsuo Yoshihara; Yoshiko Miyazaki; Kōji Yakusho; Masaharu Fukuyama
- Edited by: Shigeru Nishiyama
- Music by: Masakatsu Takagi
- Production company: Studio Chizu
- Distributed by: Toho
- Release dates: May 16, 2018 (Directors' Fortnight); July 20, 2018 (Japan)
- Running time: 98 minutes
- Country: Japan
- Language: Japanese
- Box office: $30.4 million

Mirai (Japanese: 未来のミライ, Hepburn: Mirai no Mirai; lit. 'Mirai of the Future') is a 2018 Japanese animated film, written and directed by Mamoru Hosoda and produced by Studio Chizu. Mirai stars the voices of Moka Kamishiraishi, Haru Kuroki, Gen Hoshino, Kumiko Aso, Mitsuo Yoshihara, Yoshiko Miyazaki, Kōji Yakusho and Masaharu Fukuyama.

Mirai premiered on May 16, 2018, at Directors' Fortnight and released in Japan on July 20, 2018. The film was nominated for Best Animated Feature Film at the 76th Golden Globe Awards, the 24th Critics' Choice Awards, and the 91st Academy Awards, but lost all three to Spider-Man: Into the Spider-Verse.

== Plot ==
Kun is a 4-year-old boy born to an executive mother and an architect father. The family lives in a stepped house in Kanazawa-ku, Yokohama that Kun's father designed around a tree, where Kun spends his days playing with the family dog, Yukko, and his toy train sets. Kun's sister Mirai (Japanese for "future") is born, and he is happy at first but soon grows jealous when his parents focus all their attention on her. He lashes out at his parents, especially when his father becomes a work at home parent conducting remote work, while his mother returns to the office.

After one such tantrum, Kun stomps off to the house's garden, where he meets a strange man who claims to be the "prince" of the house. As the man whines about how he lost all the attention when Kun was born, Kun realizes that the man is actually Yukko turned human. He finds Yukko's tail on the man; when he removes it and places it on himself, he transforms into a dog.

On Hinamatsuri (Girls Day), the family set up the traditional dolls to wish Mirai good luck. Kun's father neglects to put the dolls away after the holiday ends. Frustrated again with his family, Kun runs back to the garden. This time he meets a 14-year-old girl who claims to be Mirai from the future, whom Kun is able to recognize by the birthmark on her right hand. She has somehow come back in time, concerned because every day the dolls are not put away adds one year before she can marry. Future Mirai is able to put the dolls away with Kun and humanized Yukko's help.

Kun's mother shows him photos of herself when she was a 6-year-old but he continues to give his mother a hard time. In the garden again, he is transported years back to the past. In town, he runs into a little girl whom he recognizes from the photos as his mother. The girl is angry at her grandmother for refusing to give her a pet cat. Kun's mother leaves a note inside her grandmother's shoes asking her for a pet cat. They return home, where the little girl dumps toys all over the floor and food all over the table. Her mother, Kun's grandmother, furiously scolds the girl as she sobs. Kun returns to the present, and now shows sympathy for his mother, but continues to complain about everything.

Kun leaves a note asking for a bicycle in his mom's shoes and gets a bicycle with training wheels for a present, but wants to learn how to ride without the wheels after seeing the older kids. His father helps him but Kun seems unable to keep the bike upright. He goes back to the garden, where he is transported to the past, this time to a workshop in rural Japan. A young man with an injured leg takes Kun on a ride on one of the horses near his shop, then on his motorcycle. Back in the present, Kun successfully rides his bike using what he learned. Kun's mother shows him photos, revealing the man to be his great-grandfather, who has died just recently.

The family decides to go for a day trip. Kun once again throws a fit over his outfit. In the garden, he finds a train station (the Isogo Station). An 18-year-old man warns him not to board the train but Kun disobeys him. The train takes him to Tokyo Station, where he panics about being alone. He finds an attendant who needs the name of a relative to call and Kun realizes that he doesn't even know the names of his own parents. The attendant sends Kun to a bullet train, telling him that if they can't find anyone to pick him up, he must board that train to take him to "Lonely Land," which is essentially hell. Kun spots baby Mirai about to board the train and rescues her. At this point, he finally acknowledges that he is her older brother.

Baby Mirai disappears, and future Mirai arrives to take Kun home by flying through the air. They land in the tree, which houses the family's past. Kun sees that his father was physically too weak to ride a bike when he was young, that Yukko left his mother to become their pet, that Kun's mother stopped liking cats when she saw a stray one kill a bird, and that World War II left his great-grandfather's leg injured, so Kun's great-grandmother let him win the race she proposed to win her hand in marriage. Kun also sees the future, and discovers that the young man at Isogo Station is future Kun. Back in the present, Kun, now more open-minded, goes on the trip with his family.

== Voice cast ==
Character	Japanese voice actor	English voice actor
Kun Ota (太田くん, Ōta Kun)	Moka Kamishiraishi; Tasuku Hatanaka (adult)	Jaden Waldman; Evan Smith (adult)
Mirai Ota (太田ミライ, Ōta Mirai)	Haru Kuroki; Kaede Hondo (baby)	Victoria Grace
The father (おとうさん, Otōsan)	Gen Hoshino	John Cho
The mother (おかあさん, Okāsan)	Kumiko Aso; Sakura Saiga (young)	Rebecca Hall; Madigan Kacmar (young)
Mysterious man (謎の男, Nazo no otoko)	Mitsuo Yoshihara	Crispin Freeman
The grandmother (ばあば, Bāba)	Yoshiko Miyazaki	Eileen T'Kaye; Valerie Arem (young)
The grandfather (じいじ, Jiiji)	Kōji Yakusho	Victor Brandt
The great-grandfather (曽祖父, Sōsofu)	Masaharu Fukuyama	Daniel Dae Kim
The great-grandmother (曽祖母, Sōsobo)	Asami Sanada	Stephanie Sheh

== Production ==
Hosoda was partially inspired to write the script for Mirai after seeing his then-three-year-old son's first reactions to having a baby sister in his life. While initially only cautious of the newborn when meeting her for the first time, Hosoda's son threw a tantrum one day, jealous of the attention that his parents were giving his sister. Hosoda's curiosity with how his son reacted, and how he would adapt to being a big brother, prompted him to make the protagonist of Mirai four years old.

By making the protagonist so young, Hosoda wanted to capture what life would be like at such a young age. To do this, he brought his own children to the Studio Chizu office so that animators had plenty of reference material to sketch and animate from. Hosoda also wanted to use the fantasy elements of Mirai to propel inner character development, stating, "... when the main character meets other people through those elements and changes – it's not those elements that help him change; it's really what he feels inside." Since Mirai was about "how a family can change but always [remained] itself", Hosoda chose to have the film take place in Yokohama, a "city that is constantly changing".

Kun's great-grandfather's story was loosely based on Hosoda's wife's great-grandfather, who also worked on warplanes and became injured in wartime conflict.

To achieve better authenticity, Hosoda worked with professionals outside of the animation industry to design some of the assets used in the film. Kun's family's house, designed on-screen by Kun's father, was actually designed by real-life architect Makoto Tanijiri. For the sequence where Kun is alone at the train station, Hosoda consulted with Japanese engineer Hideo Shima, designer of Japan's bullet train, to create a model of the shinkansen that was more frightening. In addition, the paper cutouts of strangers that Kun meets were designed by children's book author and illustrator duo Tupera Tupera, whose books his son loves.

== Music ==
Masakatsu Takagi, who had previously scored Hosoda's Wolf Children and The Boy and the Beast, returned to write the soundtrack for Mirai. Takagi's initial film score was more pop-oriented with Brazilian influences, but Hosoda wanted something more simple and reflective of family.

Singer-songwriter Tatsuro Yamashita provided the theme songs for the film: "Mirai no Theme" and "Music train". This is the second time that Yamashita collaborated with Hosoda since his 2009 film Summer Wars. The two songs were included in his 51st single, released on July 11.

== Promotion and release ==
Mirai's world premiere took place as the Palm Chevalier of the Directors' Fortnight, an independent section held in parallel to the Cannes Film Festival, on May 16, 2018, and then was shown at Annecy International Animation Film Festival and the Sydney Film Festival in June. The film was released in Japan on July 20, 2018.

Madman Entertainment acquired the film for Australia and New Zealand, brought the film to the Sydney Film Festival and then released it theatrically on August 23, 2018, in Australia and September 20 in New Zealand. Anime Limited released the film in the United Kingdom and Ireland, premiering the film at BFI London Film Festival on October 13, 2018, followed theatrical releases on November 2 in Japanese and November 4 in English. GKIDS acquired the film for North America, and premiered the film at the Animation Is Film Festival in Los Angeles on October 19, 2018, with a national release on November 29.

To promote the release of the film, the Tokyo Dome Hotel featured Mirai-themed rooms between August 18 and September 16, 2018. In addition, a Hosoda film exhibition, featuring production materials from Mirai and his other movies, was available at Tokyo Dome City's Gallery AaMo from July 25 to September 17, 2018. Children's picture books were also released on July 20 and August 2, 2018.

== Reception ==
=== Box office ===
Domestically, Mirai opened at #2 in Japan, earning approximately ¥400,000,000 on opening weekend. This was a 40% decrease from The Boy and the Beast's ¥5,000,000,000 in opening weekend gross earnings. It fell from #2 to #3 in its second weekend, earning roughly ¥289,012,900 based on 215,000 additional tickets sold. Overall, Mirai grossed a total of $23,683,483 in Japan.

In the United States, Mirai earned a total of $812,794. Globally, the film earned $28,185,289 worldwide.

=== Critical response ===
On the review aggregator website Rotten Tomatoes, 91% of 85 critics' reviews are positive, with an average rating of 7.5/10. The website's consensus reads: "The simplicity and colorful warmth of Mirai's animation is underscored by a story with surprising - and deeply affecting - depth and emotional resonance." On Metacritic, the film has a weighted average score of 81 out of 100 based on 18 critics, indicating "universal acclaim".

Peter Travers of the Rolling Stone gave Mirai four-and-a-half stars out of five, stating that despite the movie seeming like "[Hosoda's] smallest film", it "has an emotional resonance that defies its conventional underpinnings". Bilge Ebiri of The New York Times praised the film, remarking that Hosoda "privileges moments of emotion over belabored story mechanics". Variety's Peter Debruge writes that while Mirai might be a "gentler and potentially younger-skewing film" than Hosoda's previous works, it is "the work of a true auteur (in what feels like his most personal film yet) presented as innocuous family entertainment".

On the other hand, Sara Stewart of the New York Post criticized its "outdated gender roles", referring to Kun's father being "hopelessly clumsy as caregiver", and said that Kun's temper tantrums were "a little grating to sit through". Writing for RogerEbert.com, Simon Abrams believed the film's daydream sequences "simply don't feel like anything a real child would imagine". He further wrote: "Even the film's general theme—children can be overwhelming before they learn how to control their emotions—is only hinted at, never thoughtfully expressed."

=== Accolades ===
Award	Date of ceremony	Category	Recipient(s)	Result	Ref.
Academy Awards	February 24, 2019	Best Animated Feature	Mamoru Hosoda & Yūichirō Saitō	Nominated	
Annie Awards	February 2, 2019	Best Animated Feature – Independent	Yūichirō Saitō, Takuya Itō, Yūichi Adachi and Genki Kawamura	Won	
Annie Awards	February 2, 2019	Outstanding Achievement for Writing in an Animated Feature Production	Mamoru Hosoda and Stephanie Sheh (English version)	Nominated	
Asia Pacific Screen Awards	November 29, 2018	Best Animated Feature Film	Mamoru Hosoda & Yūichirō Saitō	Nominated	
Critics' Choice Movie Awards	January 13, 2019	Best Animated Feature	Mamoru Hosoda	Nominated	
Crunchyroll Anime Awards	February 16, 2019	Best Film	Mirai	Nominated	
Florida Film Critics Circle Awards	December 21, 2018	Best Animated Film	Mirai	Won	
Golden Globe Awards	January 6, 2019	Best Animated Feature Film	Mamoru Hosoda & Yūichirō Saitō	Nominated	
Japan Academy Prize	March 1, 2019	Animation of the Year	Mirai	Won	
Satellite Awards	February 22, 2019	Best Animated or Mixed Media Feature	Mamoru Hosoda	Nominated	
Washington D.C. Area Film Critics Association Awards	December 3, 2018	Best Animated Feature	Mamoru Hosoda	Nominated	
Stuttgart Animated Film Festival	May 2019	AniMovie Award for Best Animated Feature Film	Mirai	Won	

== Other media ==
=== Novel ===
A novelization of the film by Hosoda was announced in April 2018, was in three versions prior to the premiere of the film in Japan, published by Kadokawa. The first version was released under Kadokawa Bunko's literature label on June 15, the second version under Kadokawa Tsubasa Bunko on June 30, and the third version under Kadokawa Sneaker Bunko on July 1, 2018.

Yen Press announced at Anime Expo 2018 that they had licensed the novel for the English language. The English translation was done by Winifred Bird. They published it in hardcover and e-book on October 30.
