= Still the Water =

2014 film

- Film poster
- Directed by: Naomi Kawase
- Written by: Naomi Kawase
- Produced by: Rémi Burah; Takehiko Aoki; Masamichi Sawada; Naomi Kawase
- Starring: Nijirō Murakami; Jun Yoshinaga
- Edited by: Tina Baz
- Music by: Hasiken
- Distributed by: Asmik Ace
- Release dates: 20 May 2014 (Cannes); 26 July 2014 (Japan)
- Running time: 110 minutes
- Country: Japan
- Language: Japanese

Still the Water (2つ目の窓, Futatsume no Mado) is a 2014 Japanese romance film written and directed by Naomi Kawase. It was filmed in the scenic nature of Amami City in Kagoshima Prefecture in 2013. The score was composed by singer-songwriter Hasiken.

Still the Water was selected to compete for the Palme d'Or at the 2014 Cannes Film Festival. Describing the film as her "masterpiece", Kawase said it was deserving of the Palme d'Or. "This is the first time that I have said this about a film," the writer-director said, "After the Camera d'Or and the Grand Prix, there is nothing I want more than the Palme d'Or. I have my eyes on nothing else."

== Cast ==
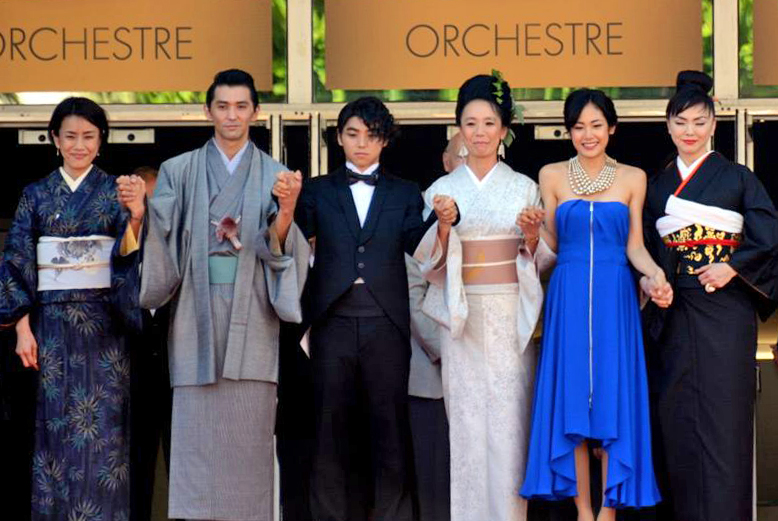
Cast and crew at the 2014 Cannes Film Festival

- Nijirō Murakami
- Jun Yoshinaga
- Tetta Sugimoto
- Miyuki Matsuda
- Makiko Watanabe
- Jun Murakami
- Hideo Sakaki
- Fujio Tokita
- Faith eledia

== Reception ==
Still the Water has an approval rating of 52% on review aggregator website Rotten Tomatoes, based on 23 reviews, and an average rating of 5.7/10. Metacritic assigned the film a weighted average score of 58 out of 100, based on 9 critics, indicating "mixed or average reviews". Reviewing it at Cannes, Nikola Grozdanovic at Indiewire gave it a B+, stating that "'Still The Water' is a spectacle for the senses, which, if there is any justice, will be remembered as one of the greater films of the competition." In The Guardian, Peter Bradshaw gave it 3 out of 5 stars and stated, "Kawase's film is sometimes beautiful and moving but I couldn't help occasionally finding it a little contrived and self-conscious." In Film Business Asia, Derek Elley gave the film a rating of 2 out of 10, calling it "more empty, pretentious ramblings from self-styled auteur Kawase Naomi".
