= Akira Takayama =

Japanese theatre director (born 1969)

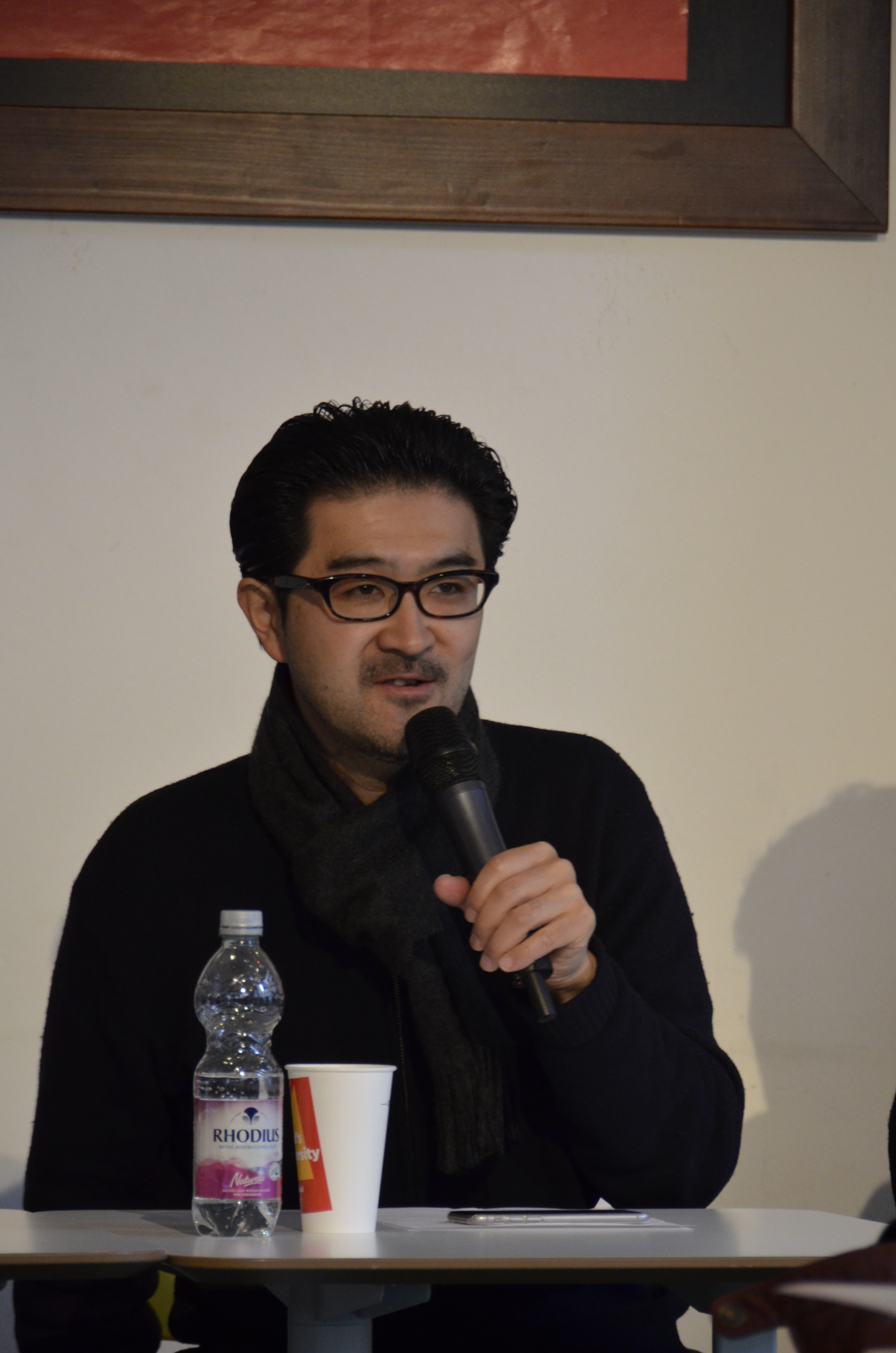
- Takayama in 2017
- Born: 1969 (age 56–57); Saitama Prefecture, Japan
- Occupation: Theatre director

Akira Takayama (高山 明, Takayama Akira; born 1969) is a Japanese director. He is the leader of the theatre unit Port B, which he founded in 2003 to create site-specific performances.

== Life, career, and style ==
Takayama was born in 1969 and spent several years in Germany studying theatre and linguistics. He returned to Japan in 1999 where he started initially making German-influenced productions, such as an adaption of a Brecht Lehr-stücke. His projects are now characterized by their use of the identity or history of a certain locale, such as the Sugamo area of north Tokyo, and the interaction or involvement of the "audience". He looks at contemporary issues, such as the rising numbers of working poor in Japan, and also makes extensive use of social and digital media.

Takayama's unit, Port B, is a loose team of artists, scholars and activists from different backgrounds. The name "Port B" is a reference to Portbou, the Spanish border town where Walter Benjamin committed suicide in his failed bid to escape the Nazis in 1940. Benjamin is an influence on Port B.

Later productions included Tokyo/Olympics (2007), which took audiences on a seven-hour bus tour of the places prominent in Tokyo's post-war recovery, as symbolized by its Olympic Games. Audience members also traveled through areas like Sugamo and Harajuku partly by foot, using an MP3 player to listen to commentary and interviews. In this way, the performance took on the form of an oral history walking tour and coach tour that is immersive for the participants.

Sunshine 62 (2008) was a walking tour of sites in Toshima ward, Tokyo, which has seen regeneration projects like the construction of the Sunshine 60 building, against the backdrop of sites that have disappeared, such as the former prison that housed war criminals.

In recent years Takayama has been presenting his new Port B work as part of the annual Festival/Tokyo, Japan's largest performing arts event. This includes Compartment City – Tokyo (2009), which saw a temporary prefab house installed in a park in Tokyo, where visitors could enter to watch video interviews with unexpected urban residents. It was intended partly to create an experience of the private space within the public, against the context of growing numbers of internet cafe "refugees" in Japan. It was later also staged at the Wiener Festwochen.

== The Complete Manual of Evacuation – Tokyo ==
Presented as part of Festival/Tokyo 2010, The Complete Manual of Evacuation – Tokyo was an interactive theatre project that involved audiences first logging onto a special website. After answering a series of basic personality test questions, they were then recommended an "evacuation" site located around the Yamanote Line that they had to make their own way to, assisted by directions on the website and signs near the actual site. The spots varied from arranged meetings with homeless people to encounters with minority groups, such as the Muslim community in Tokyo. Participants were then encouraged to post their responses to Twitter.

The work was recreated by Takayama in the Frankfurt Rhine-Main area in September and October 2014, in collaboration with many other artists. Evacuate Frankfurt involved more than 30 commuter and streetcar stations, uncovering unfamiliar spots in the urban territory of the region and exploring new meanings to the term "evacuation".

== Referendum Project ==
In response to the March 11 earthquake and tsunami, and the subsequent Fukushima crisis, Takayama created the Referendum Project for Festival/Tokyo 2011. He was inspired by the Zwentendorf Nuclear Power Plant, which was cancelled following a public referendum.

The project was a specially converted truck that visitors could enter to watch video interviews with hundreds of school children in Fukushima and Tokyo. They were all asked the same questions regarding their daily lives and their feelings about the current situation in Japan. Visitors were free to watch whichever and how many interviews they wanted in their own private booth, before "voting" in the fictional referendum themselves by filling out a questionnaire with the same kinds of questions. The installation truck toured to different locations in Tokyo, Yokohama and Fukushima over a one-month period. The project was intended to galvanize people into direct political and social action, though Takayama expressed disappointment at the passivity of local audiences. "Audiences didn't follow as closely as I'd hoped," he said. "They were mostly passive observers. I'd hoped to stimulate people a bit more, but it didn't seem to have that effect."

The project is ongoing and has since collected interviews with school students in Nagasaki and Hiroshima, and has also toured to Vienna (Wiener Festwochen 2013) and Berlin (Hebbel am Ufer, 2014).

== Kein Licht II ==
Takayama continued his response to the Fukushima disaster with his next project for the annual Festival/Tokyo's 2012 program. Kein Licht II was a site-specific, walking tour-style theatre experience based on the text Kein Licht – Epilog? by Elfriede Jelinek, written in 2011 response to the Fukushima events. A Japanese translation of the text was edited and then sections were recorded by high school girls in the Fukushima region. Audiences were given small transistor radios at a start point in Shinbashi, an area associated with Tokyo's modernization and post-war economic push (and where the TEPCO headquarters are located), and also received a small pack of postcards. The postcards featured media images from the 2011 Fukushima crisis and on the back, maps and directions to take them to different locations. Audience members then departed alone and walked around the area by themselves, following the route and, at each stop, tuned the radio to the frequency to hear the students' voices reading out a part of the Jelinek text. Each location was a recreation of the media image on the postcard. The performance was a success and extended by popular demand.

== Tokyo Heterotopia ==
Tokyo Heterotopia was a radio tour around Tokyo, tracing the lives of Asian exchange students and other Asian connections in the city. It featured special readings of texts created out of research into the history of certain sites in Tokyo. Audience members received a special booklet and radio, and were then free to travel to the sites around the city however they liked. The title is a reference to Michel Foucault's concept of a heterotopia space of otherness. Following its original Tokyo production in November and December 2013 as part of Festival/Tokyo 2013, a follow-up was created for the Yokohama Triennale 2014. Yokohama Commune was a video installation featuring the voices of Indochina refugees living in Japan. It had an extended life after the Yokohama Triennale was over as a "live installation" with the participants in a Japanese classroom.

== Citations ==
- Iwaki, Kyoko Tokyo Theatre Today – Conversations with Eight Emerging Theatre Artists (2011) Hublet Publishing (2011/11/6) ISBN 978-4-9904717-4-3
- Eckersall, Peter Performativity and Event in 1960s Japan: City, Body, Memory (2013) Palgrave Macmillan (2013/9) ISBN 978-1-137-01737-6
- Hildebrandt, Toni Tokyo Heterotopia (2025) Parallax, Issue 1: Critical Postmedia: Reframing Japanese Contemporary Art, pp. 74–89.
