= Democratic Party (Japan) =

Democratic Party may refer to:

- Democratic Party (Japan, 1947)
- Democratic Party (Japan, 1996), commonly abbreviated as DPJ
- Democratic Party of Japan (1998–2016), commonly abbreviated as DPJ
- Democratic Party (Japan, 2016), commonly abbreviated as DP
- Constitutional Democratic Party of Japan (2017–2020; 2020–present), commonly abbreviated as CDP or CDPJ
- Democratic Party for the People (2018–2020; 2020–present), commonly abbreviated as DPFP or DPP
- Japan Democratic Party (1954–1955), commonly abbreviated as JDP
