= Cheer Up! The Summer =

"CHEER UP! THE SUMMER"
- Cover

Single by Tatsuro Yamashita
- Released: September 14, 2016
- Label: Warner Music Japan

"Cheer Up! The Summer" (styled in all caps) is a single by Japanese recording artist Tatsuro Yamashita. It was released on September 14, 2016. It reached eighth place on the Oricon Weekly Singles Chart on its release, selling 9,846 copies. It was also placed tenth on the Billboard Japan Hot 100.

== Track listing ==
No.	Title	Length
1.	"Cheer up! The summer"
2.	"Can't take my eyes off of you ～君の瞳に恋してる" (Live)
3.	"Cheer up! The summer" (Original karaoke)

== Weekly charts ==
Chart (2016)	Peak position
Japan Singles Chart (Oricon)	8
Japan Hot 100 (Billboard)	10
Japan Radio Songs (Billboard)	1
Japan Top Singles Sales (Billboard)	13
